= Chess World Cup 2005 =

Chess tournament in Khanty-Mansiysk, Russia

FIDE Chess World Cup 2005
- 2005
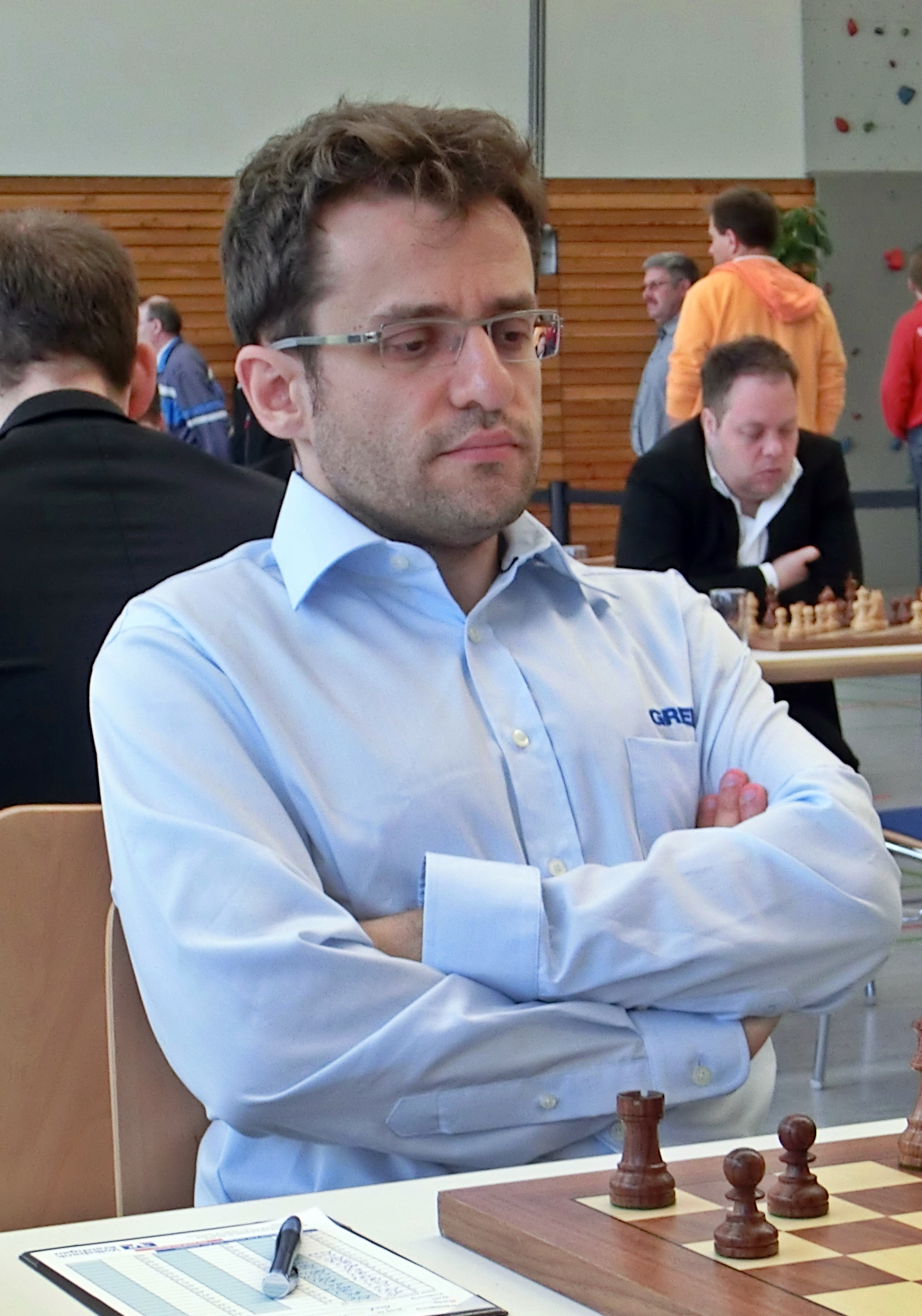
- 2005 FIDE World Cup winner Levon Aronian

Tournament information
- Sport: Chess
- Location: Khanty-Mansiysk, Russia
- Dates: 27 November 2005–17 December 2005
- Administrator: FIDE
- Tournament format: Single-elimination tournament
- Host: Chess Federation of Russia

Final positions
- Champion: (Armenia) Levon Aronian
- Runner-up: (Ukraine) Ruslan Ponomariov
- 3rd place: (France) Étienne Bacrot

The Chess World Cup 2005 served as a qualification tournament for the FIDE World Chess Championship 2007. It was held as a 128-player tournament from 27 November to 17 December 2005 in Khanty-Mansiysk, Russia.

The top ten finishers qualified for the candidates matches of the World Chess Championship 2007. One of them (Étienne Bacrot) had already qualified for the candidates matches via rating, freeing the place for the eleventh player at the World Cup (Vladimir Malakhov).

The World Cup was won by Armenian grandmaster Levon Aronian.

== Background ==
The 2005 World Cup was part of the cycle for the World Chess Championship 2007. The top ten finishers qualified for the 2007 Candidates Tournament. However third-placed Étienne Bacrot had already qualified for the Candidates by rating, so eleventh-placed Vladimir Malakhov also qualified.

Three of the players at the World Cup, Levon Aronian, Alexander Grischuk and Boris Gelfand, were successful in the Candidates and qualified for the World Championship tournament, which was held as an eight-player double round-robin event, with Gelfand finishing third.

The four top finishers of the FIDE World Chess Championship 2005 (Veselin Topalov, Viswanathan Anand, Peter Svidler and Alexander Morozevich) were already invited to the World Championship 2007 and thus exempt from the World Cup.

== Playing conditions ==
The tournament was in the style of the FIDE World Chess Championships between 1998 and 2004: each round consisted of a two-game match, followed by tie breaks at faster time controls if required. In rounds 1–3 losing players were eliminated. However, in rounds 4–6 defeated players progressed to the next round, to determine standings of the 16 best players.

The time control for regular games was 90 minutes for the first 40 moves and 15 minutes for the rest of the game, with 30 seconds added after each move. Tie breaks consisted of two rapid chess games (25 minutes each + 10 seconds per move); followed by two blitz games if required (5 minutes + 10 seconds per move); followed by a single Armageddon chess game if required (white has 6 minutes and must win, black has 5 minutes and only needs to draw).

== Qualification ==
The following players qualified for the World Cup:

- Three of the four semi-finalists of the FIDE World Chess Championship 2004 (Rustam Kasimdzhanov, Michael Adams and Teimour Radjabov); the fourth semi-finalist, Veselin Topalov, was the reigning FIDE World Champion and already had a berth in the next championship.
- Women's World Champion 2004 (Antoaneta Stefanova).
- Junior World Champion 2004 (Pendyala Harikrishna).
- 22 players with the highest Elo rating. The average ratings from July 2004 and January 2005 were used.
- 90 players qualified from the continental and zonal championships:
  - 46 players from Europe,
  - 19 players from the Americas,
  - 19 players from Asia and Oceania,
  - 6 players from Africa.
- 8 nominees of the FIDE President.
- 3 nominees of the local Organising Committee.

== Participants ==
All players are Grandmasters unless indicated otherwise.

1. Vasyl Ivanchuk (UKR), 2748
2. Étienne Bacrot (FRA), 2725
3. Levon Aronian (ARM), 2724
4. Alexander Grischuk (RUS), 2720
5. Boris Gelfand (ISR), 2717
6. Alexei Shirov (ESP), 2710
7. Vladimir Akopian (ARM), 2707
8. Teimour Radjabov (AZE), 2704
9. Ruslan Ponomariov (UKR), 2704
10. Sergei Tiviakov (NED), 2699
11. Ivan Sokolov (NED), 2696
12. Alexey Dreev (RUS), 2694
13. Gata Kamsky (USA), 2690
14. Viorel Bologan (MDA), 2682
15. Joël Lautier (FRA), 2679
16. Lázaro Bruzón (CUB), 2677
17. Evgeny Bareev (RUS), 2675
18. Shakhriyar Mamedyarov (AZE), 2674
19. Francisco Vallejo Pons (ESP), 2674
20. Ilya Smirin (ISR), 2673
21. Pentala Harikrishna (IND), 2673
22. Vladimir Malakhov (RUS), 2670
23. Konstantin Sakaev (RUS), 2668
24. Andrei Volokitin (UKR), 2666
25. Alexander Moiseenko (UKR), 2663
26. Krishnan Sasikiran (IND), 2663
27. Pavel Eljanov (UKR), 2663
28. Hikaru Nakamura (USA), 2662
29. Vadim Zvjaginsev (RUS), 2659
30. Sergey Karjakin (UKR), 2658
31. Artyom Timofeev (RUS), 2658
32. Zurab Azmaiparashvili (GEO), 2658
33. Michał Krasenkow (POL), 2655
34. Emil Sutovsky (ISR), 2654
35. Alexander Areshchenko (UKR), 2653
36. Alexander Khalifman (RUS), 2653
37. Vadim Milov (SUI), 2652
38. Mikhail Gurevich (TUR), 2652
39. Sergei Rublevsky (RUS), 2652
40. Loek van Wely (NED), 2648
41. Ye Jiangchuan (CHN), 2648
42. Zviad Izoria (GEO), 2646
43. David Navara (CZE), 2646
44. Giovanni Vescovi (BRA), 2646
45. Karen Asrian (ARM), 2645
46. Dmitry Jakovenko (RUS), 2644
47. Evgeniy Najer (RUS), 2641
48. Arkadij Naiditsch (GER), 2641
49. Alexander Onischuk (USA), 2640
50. Julio Granda (PER), 2637
51. Zahar Efimenko (UKR), 2637
52. Pavel Smirnov (RUS), 2637
53. Sergei Movsesian (SVK), 2635
54. Mikhail Kobalia (RUS), 2634
55. Evgenij Miroshnichenko (UKR), 2634
56. Alexander Motylev (RUS), 2632
57. Evgeny Alekseev (RUS), 2632
58. Alexander G. Beliavsky (SLO), 2631
59. Vasilios Kotronias (GRE), 2626
60. Rubén Felgaer (ARG), 2624
61. Andrei Istrățescu (ROU), 2622
62. Gilberto Milos (BRA), 2620
63. Robert Kempinski (POL), 2619
64. Ivan Cheparinov (BUL), 2618
65. Alexei Fedorov (BLR), 2616
66. Rafael A. Vaganian (ARM), 2614
67. Darmen Sadvakasov (KAZ), 2612
68. Ľubomír Ftáčnik (SVK), 2612
69. Gregory S. Kaidanov (USA), 2608
70. Ni Hua (CHN), 2603
71. Baadur Jobava (GEO), 2601
72. Murtas Kazhgaleyev (KAZ), 2601
73. Michael Roiz (ISR), 2600
74. Oleg Korneev (RUS), 2599
75. Zhang Zhong (CHN), 2598
76. Mark Paragua (PHI), 2596
77. Dmitry Bocharov (RUS), 2592
78. Bartłomiej Macieja (POL), 2591
79. Alexander Ivanov (USA), 2589
80. Valerij Popov (RUS), 2588
81. Pavel Kotsur (KAZ), 2587
82. Ehsan Ghaem Maghami (IRI), 2586
83. Rafael Leitão (BRA), 2586
84. Wang Yue (CHN), 2585
85. Utut Adianto (INA), 2584
86. Predrag Nikolić (BIH), 2584
87. Sergey Erenburg (ISR), 2582
88. Xu Jun (CHN), 2582
89. Artashes Minasian (ARM), 2581
90. Đào Thiên Hải (VIE), 2581
91. Robert Markuš (SCG), 2579
92. Levan Pantsulaia (GEO), 2578
93. Ernesto Inarkiev (RUS), 2577
94. Alexander Stripunsky (USA), 2576
95. Hichem Hamdouchi (MAR), 2574
96. Farrukh Amonatov (TJK), 2572
97. Magnus Carlsen (NOR), 2570
98. Evgenij Agrest (SWE), 2570
99. Csaba Balogh (HUN), 2567
100. Yuri Shulman (USA), 2565
101. Surya Shekhar Ganguly (IND), 2562
102. Sergey Kudrin (USA), 2551
103. Alexei Iljushin (RUS), 2546
104. Yuriy Kuzubov (UKR), 2541
105. Cao Sang (HUN), 2538
106. Darcy Lima (BRA), 2529
107. Wang Hao (CHN), 2519, no title
108. Yu Shaoteng (CHN), 2516
109. Walter Arencibia (CUB), 2510
110. Li Shilong (CHN), 2510
111. Nurlan Ibraev (KAZ), 2508, IM
112. Rodrigo Vasquez (CHI), 2506
113. Nikolai Kabanov (RUS), 2506, IM
114. Aleksei Pridorozhni (RUS), 2506, IM
115. Carlos Matamoros Franco (ECU), 2501
116. Zhao Jun (CHN), 2500
117. Pascal Charbonneau (CAN), 2500, IM
118. Antoaneta Stefanova (BUL), 2491
119. Slim Belkhodja (TUN), 2490
120. Ahmed Adly (EGY), 2480
121. Diego Flores (ARG), 2479, IM
122. Gary Lane (AUS), 2445, IM
123. Kirill Kuderinov (KAZ), 2432, FM
124. Watu Kobese (RSA), 2400, IM
125. Gastón Needleman (ARG), 2381, no title
126. Ali Frhat (EGY), 2306, FM
127. Stanley Chumfwa (ZAM), 2303, no title
128. Aleksandr Sibriaev (RUS), 2264, FM

Note: 7th seed Akopian did not show up for his first round match against Lane and lost on forfeit.

== Final standings ==
1. Levon Aronian (Armenia)
2. Ruslan Ponomariov (Ukraine)
3. Étienne Bacrot (France)
4. Alexander Grischuk (Russia)
5. Evgeny Bareev (Russia)
6. Boris Gelfand (Israel)
7. Sergei Rublevsky (Russia)
8. Mikhail Gurevich (Turkey)
9. Gata Kamsky (USA)
10. Magnus Carlsen (Norway)
11. Vladimir Malakhov (Russia)
12. Francisco Vallejo Pons (Spain)
13. Alexey Dreev (Russia)
14. Loek van Wely (Netherlands)
15. Joël Lautier (France)
16. Konstantin Sakaev (Russia)

The top 11 qualified for the 2007 Candidates Tournament.

== Results, rounds 5–7 ==
Quarterfinals
5	(Israel) Boris Gelfand	2
4	(Russia) Alexander Grischuk	4
17	(Russia) Evgeny Bareev	½
9	(Ukraine) Ruslan Ponomariov	1½
39	(Russia) Sergei Rublevsky	½
2	(France) Étienne Bacrot	1½
3	(Armenia) Levon Aronian	1½
38	(Turkey) Mikhail Gurevich	½

Semifinals (best of 2)
4	(Russia) Alexander Grischuk	1
9	(Ukraine) Ruslan Ponomariov	3
2	(France) Étienne Bacrot	½
3	(Armenia) Levon Aronian	1½

Final (best of 2)
9	(Ukraine) Ruslan Ponomariov	1
3	(Armenia) Levon Aronian	3

The losers in rounds 4-6 played further mini matches to establish the places 3–16.

=== Placement matches ===
Round 5

For places 9–16

- (97) Magnus Carlsen 1½–½ Joël Lautier (15)
- (13) Gata Kamsky 1½–½ Konstantin Sakaev (23)
- (22) Vladimir Malakhov 1½–½ Alexey Dreev (12)
- (19) Francisco Vallejo Pons 2½–1½ Loek van Wely (40)

Round 6

For places 5–8

- (39) Sergei Rublevsky 1½–2½ Evgeny Bareev (17)
- (38) Mikhail Gurevich 0–2 Boris Gelfand (5)

For places 9–12

- (22) Vladimir Malakhov 2½–3½ Magnus Carlsen (97)
- (13) Gata Kamsky 3½–2½ Francisco Vallejo Pons (19)

For places 13–16

- (15) Joël Lautier 2½–3½ Loek van Wely (40)
- (12) Alexey Dreev 1½–½ Konstantin Sakaev (23)

Round 7

3rd place match

- (2) Étienne Bacrot 2½–1½ Alexander Grischuk (4)

5th place match

- (5) Boris Gelfand 1½–2½ Evgeny Bareev (17)

7th place match

- (39) Sergei Rublevsky 1½–½ Mikhail Gurevich (38)

9th place match

- (97) Magnus Carlsen 1–3 Gata Kamsky (13)

11th place match

- (22) Vladimir Malakhov 1½–½ Francisco Vallejo Pons (19)

13th place match

- (40) Loek van Wely 1½–2½ Alexey Dreev (12)

15th place match

- (15) Joël Lautier 3½–3½ Konstantin Sakaev (23)

== Results, rounds 1-4 ==
=== Section 1 ===
First round
1	(Ukraine) Vasyl Ivanchuk	1½
128	(Russia) Aleksandr Sibriaev	½
64	(Bulgaria) Ivan Cheparinov	2½
65	(Belarus) Alexei Fedorov	1½
32	(Georgia (country)) Zurab Azmaiparashvili	1
97	(Norway) Magnus Carlsen	3
33	(Poland) Michał Krasenkow	1
96	(Tajikistan) Farrukh Amonatov	3
16	(Cuba) Lázaro Bruzón	2½
113	(Russia) Nikolai Kabanov	1½
49	(United States) Alexander Onischuk	1½
80	(Russia) Valerij Popov	½
17	(Russia) Evgeny Bareev	1½
112	(Chile) Rodrigo Vasquez	½
48	(Germany) Arkadij Naiditsch	1½
81	(Kazakhstan) Pavel Kotsur	½

Quarter-finals
1	(Ukraine) Vasyl Ivanchuk	½
64	(Bulgaria) Ivan Cheparinov	1½
97	(Norway) Magnus Carlsen	1½
96	(Tajikistan) Farrukh Amonatov	½
16	(Cuba) Lázaro Bruzón	2½
49	(United States) Alexander Onischuk	1½
17	(Russia) Evgeny Bareev	1½
48	(Germany) Arkadij Naiditsch	½

Third round
64	(Bulgaria) Ivan Cheparinov	1
97	(Norway) Magnus Carlsen	3
16	(Cuba) Lázaro Bruzón	1½
17	(Russia) Evgeny Bareev	2½

Fourth round
97	(Norway) Magnus Carlsen	1½
17	(Russia) Evgeny Bareev	2½

=== Section 2 ===
First round
2	(France) Étienne Bacrot	2
127	(Zambia) Stanley Chumfwa	0
63	(Poland) Robert Kempiński	3
66	(Armenia) Rafael Vaganian	1
31	(Russia) Artyom Timofeev	2½
98	(Sweden) Evgenij Agrest	1½
34	(Israel) Emil Sutovsky	2½
95	(Morocco) Hichem Hamdouchi	1½
15	(France) Joël Lautier	3
114	(Russia) Aleksei Pridorozhni	1
50	(Peru) Julio Granda	½
79	(United States) Alexander Ivanov	1½
18	(Azerbaijan) Shakhriyar Mamedyarov	2½
111	(Kazakhstan) Nurlan Ibraev	1½
47	(Russia) Evgeniy Najer	1½
82	(Iran) Ehsan Ghaem Maghami	½

Quarter-finals
2	(France) Étienne Bacrot	1½
63	(Poland) Robert Kempiński	½
31	(Russia) Artyom Timofeev	1½
34	(Israel) Emil Sutovsky	2½
15	(France) Joël Lautier	1½
79	(United States) Alexander Ivanov	½
18	(Azerbaijan) Shakhriyar Mamedyarov	3
47	(Russia) Evgeniy Najer	4

Third round
2	(France) Étienne Bacrot	3
34	(Israel) Emil Sutovsky	1
15	(France) Joël Lautier	3½
47	(Russia) Evgeniy Najer	2½

Fourth round
2	(France) Étienne Bacrot	2½
15	(France) Joël Lautier	1½

=== Section 3 ===
First round
3	(Armenia) Levon Aronian	2
126	(Egypt) Ali Frhat	0
62	(Brazil) Gilberto Milos	½
67	(Kazakhstan) Darmen Sadvakasov	1½
30	(Ukraine) Sergey Karjakin	1½
99	(Hungary) Csaba Balogh	2½
35	(Ukraine) Alexander Areshchenko	2
94	(United States) Alexander Stripunsky	0
14	(Moldova) Viorel Bologan	2
115	(Ecuador) Carlos Matamoros Franco	0
51	(Ukraine) Zahar Efimenko	3
78	(Poland) Bartłomiej Macieja	1
19	(Spain) Francisco Vallejo Pons	3
110	(China) Li Shilong	1
46	(Russia) Dmitry Jakovenko	1½
83	(Brazil) Rafael Leitão	2½

Quarter-finals
3	(Armenia) Levon Aronian	2
67	(Kazakhstan) Darmen Sadvakasov	0
99	(Hungary) Csaba Balogh	½
35	(Ukraine) Alexander Areshchenko	1½
14	(Moldova) Viorel Bologan	0
51	(Ukraine) Zahar Efimenko	2
19	(Spain) Francisco Vallejo Pons	1½
83	(Brazil) Rafael Leitão	½

Third round
3	(Armenia) Levon Aronian	1½
35	(Ukraine) Alexander Areshchenko	½
51	(Ukraine) Zahar Efimenko	1
19	(Spain) Francisco Vallejo Pons	3

Fourth round
3	(Armenia) Levon Aronian	2½
19	(Spain) Francisco Vallejo Pons	1½

=== Section 4 ===
First round
4	(Russia) Alexander Grischuk	2
125	(Argentina) Gastón Needleman	0
61	(Romania) Andrei Istrățescu	2½
68	(Slovakia) Ľubomír Ftáčnik	1½
29	(Russia) Vadim Zvjaginsev	3½
100	(United States) Yuri Shulman	3½
36	(Russia) Alexander Khalifman	2½
93	(Russia) Ernesto Inarkiev	1½
13	(United States) Gata Kamsky	1½
116	(China) Zhao Jun	½
52	(Russia) Pavel Smirnov	½
77	(Russia) Dmitry Bocharov	1½
20	(Israel) Ilya Smirin	2½
109	(Cuba) Walter Arencibia	1½
45	(Armenia) Karen Asrian	½
84	(China) Wang Yue	1½

Quarter-finals
4	(Russia) Alexander Grischuk	2
61	(Romania) Andrei Istrățescu	0
100	(United States) Yuri Shulman	3½
36	(Russia) Alexander Khalifman	3½
13	(United States) Gata Kamsky	3
77	(Russia) Dmitry Bocharov	1
20	(Israel) Ilya Smirin	2½
84	(China) Wang Yue	1½

Third round
4	(Russia) Alexander Grischuk	2½
100	(United States) Yuri Shulman	1½
13	(United States) Gata Kamsky	3½
20	(Israel) Ilya Smirin	2½

Fourth round
4	(Russia) Alexander Grischuk	1½
13	(United States) Gata Kamsky	½

=== Section 5 ===
First round
5	(Israel) Boris Gelfand	2
124	(South Africa) Watu Kobese	0
60	(Argentina) Rubén Felgaer	1½
69	(United States) Gregory S. Kaidanov	½
28	(United States) Hikaru Nakamura	0
101	(India) Surya Shekhar Ganguly	2
37	(Switzerland) Vadim Milov	½
92	(Georgia (country)) Levan Pantsulaia	1½
12	(Russia) Alexey Dreev	2
117	(Canada) Pascal Charbonneau	0
53	(Slovakia) Sergei Movsesian	½
76	(Philippines) Mark Paragua	1½
21	(India) Pendyala Harikrishna	3
108	(China) Yu Shaoteng	1
44	(Brazil) Giovanni Vescovi	1½
85	(Indonesia) Utut Adianto	½

Quarter-finals
5	(Israel) Boris Gelfand	2½
60	(Argentina) Rubén Felgaer	1½
101	(India) Surya Shekhar Ganguly	1½
92	(Georgia (country)) Levan Pantsulaia	2½
12	(Russia) Alexey Dreev	3½
76	(Philippines) Mark Paragua	2½
21	(India) Pendyala Harikrishna	4
44	(Brazil) Giovanni Vescovi	2

Third round
5	(Israel) Boris Gelfand	4
92	(Georgia (country)) Levan Pantsulaia	2
12	(Russia) Alexey Dreev	2½
21	(India) Pendyala Harikrishna	1½

Fourth round
5	(Israel) Boris Gelfand	3½
12	(Russia) Alexey Dreev	2½

=== Section 6 ===
First round
6	(Spain) Alexei Shirov	1½
123	(Kazakhstan) Kirill Kuderinov	½
59	(Greece) Vasilios Kotronias	1½
70	(China) Ni Hua	½
27	(Ukraine) Pavel Eljanov	2½
102	(United States) Sergey Kudrin	1½
38	(Turkey) Mikhail Gurevich	2½
91	(Serbia and Montenegro) Robert Markuš	1½
11	(Netherlands) Ivan Sokolov	1½
118	(Bulgaria) Antoaneta Stefanova	½
54	(Russia) Mikhail Kobalia	1½
75	(China) Zhang Zhong	2½
22	(Russia) Vladimir Malakhov	1½
107	(China) Wang Hao	½
43	(Czech Republic) David Navara	3½
86	(Bosnia and Herzegovina) Predrag Nikolić	3½

Quarter-finals
6	(Spain) Alexei Shirov	2
59	(Greece) Vasilios Kotronias	0
27	(Ukraine) Pavel Eljanov	1½
38	(Turkey) Mikhail Gurevich	2½
11	(Netherlands) Ivan Sokolov	2
75	(China) Zhang Zhong	0
22	(Russia) Vladimir Malakhov	2
86	(Bosnia and Herzegovina) Predrag Nikolić	0

Third round
6	(Spain) Alexei Shirov	½
38	(Turkey) Mikhail Gurevich	1½
11	(Netherlands) Ivan Sokolov	½
22	(Russia) Vladimir Malakhov	1½

Fourth round
38	(Turkey) Mikhail Gurevich	2½
22	(Russia) Vladimir Malakhov	1½

=== Section 7 ===
First round
7	(Armenia) Vladimir Akopian
122	(Australia) Gary Lane	w/o
58	(Slovenia) Alexander Beliavsky	1
71	(Georgia (country)) Baadur Jobava	3
26	(India) Krishnan Sasikiran	1½
103	(Russia) Alexei Iljushin	½
39	(Russia) Sergei Rublevsky	1½
90	(Vietnam) Đào Thiên Hải	½
10	(Netherlands) Sergei Tiviakov	2
119	(Tunisia) Slim Belkhodja	0
55	(Ukraine) Evgenij Miroshnichenko	1½
74	(Russia) Oleg Korneev	2½
23	(Russia) Konstantin Sakaev	2
106	(Brazil) Darcy Lima	0
42	(Georgia (country)) Zviad Izoria	3
87	(Israel) Sergey Erenburg	4

Quarter-finals
122	(Australia) Gary Lane	½
71	(Georgia (country)) Baadur Jobava	1½
26	(India) Krishnan Sasikiran	2½
39	(Russia) Sergei Rublevsky	3½
10	(Netherlands) Sergei Tiviakov	4
74	(Russia) Oleg Korneev	3
23	(Russia) Konstantin Sakaev	2½
87	(Israel) Sergey Erenburg	1½

Third round
71	(Georgia (country)) Baadur Jobava	1½
39	(Russia) Sergei Rublevsky	2½
10	(Netherlands) Sergei Tiviakov	0
23	(Russia) Konstantin Sakaev	2

Fourth round
39	(Russia) Sergei Rublevsky	1½
23	(Russia) Konstantin Sakaev	½

=== Section 8 ===
First round
8	(Azerbaijan) Teimur Radjabov	2
121	(Argentina) Diego Flores	0
57	(Russia) Evgeny Alekseev	½
72	(Kazakhstan) Murtas Kazhgaleyev	1½
25	(Ukraine) Alexander Moiseenko	2
104	(Ukraine) Yuriy Kuzubov	0
40	(Netherlands) Loek van Wely	2
89	(Armenia) Artashes Minasian	0
9	(Ukraine) Ruslan Ponomariov	1½
120	(Egypt) Ahmed Adly	½
56	(Russia) Alexander Motylev	1½
73	(Israel) Michael Roiz	½
24	(Ukraine) Andrei Volokitin	½
105	(Hungary) Cao Sang	1½
41	(China) Ye Jiangchuan	½
88	(China) Xu Jun	1½

Quarter-finals
8	(Azerbaijan) Teimur Radjabov	2½
72	(Kazakhstan) Murtas Kazhgaleyev	1½
25	(Ukraine) Alexander Moiseenko	3
40	(Netherlands) Loek van Wely	4
9	(Ukraine) Ruslan Ponomariov	2½
56	(Russia) Alexander Motylev	1½
105	(Hungary) Cao Sang	½
88	(China) Xu Jun	1½

Third round
8	(Azerbaijan) Teimur Radjabov	1½
40	(Netherlands) Loek van Wely	2½
9	(Ukraine) Ruslan Ponomariov	2
88	(China) Xu Jun	0

Fourth round
40	(Netherlands) Loek van Wely	0
9	(Ukraine) Ruslan Ponomariov	2
