= Chess World Cup =

Chess tournament series

The FIDE World Cup is a major chess event organized by FIDE, the international governing body of chess.

== History ==
Three different formats have been used:

- In 2000 and 2002, it was a multi-stage tournament, with a group stage consisting of 24 players in four groups, followed by a knockout stage.
- From 2005 to 2019, it was a biennial 128-player single-elimination tournament, forming part of the qualification for the World Chess Championship.
- From the 2021 edition to the 2025 edition, the number of players has increased to 206. A system of byes is used in the first round; from the second round onwards the format is identical to the previous system.
- Beginning in 2027, the number of players will be increased to 224. Additionally, there will be two stages. The first one will be a swiss qualification, featuring four Swiss pools and nine rounds across five days. The second one will be a knockout finals, where 16 players qualified from the Swiss pools will play in a single-elimination tournament.

=== Chess World Cup (1979) ===
Before FIDE introduced the Chess World Cup, a tournament was organized in Montreal in 1979 under the name "World Cup". It was later renamed the "Man and his World Chess Challenge Cup" after the venue, Man and his World. The tournament was held as a double round-robin between ten leading grandmasters. Anatoly Karpov and Mikhail Tal shared first place after drawing each other in the final round.

=== Chess World Cup (1988–1989) ===
In 1988–1989, the Grandmasters Association (GMA), which had six players from the 1979 tournament as directors, organized six tournaments as the "GMA World Cup". Participants were high-ranking grandmasters; each round was a large round robin termed a "Grand Prix". They were considered the flagship tournaments of the GMA but were abandoned as the association gradually collapsed in the early 1990s.

== FIDE World Cup (2000–2002) ==
In 2000 and 2002 FIDE, the International Chess Federation, staged their "First Chess World Cup" and "Second Chess World Cup" respectively. These were major tournaments, but not directly linked to the World Chess Championship. Both the 2000 and 2002 events were won by Viswanathan Anand of India.

=== Winners ===
Year	Dates	Host	Players	Winner	Runner-up	Third place	Fourth place
2000	1–13 Sep	Shenyang, China	24	(India) Viswanathan Anand	(Russia) Evgeny Bareev	(Israel) Boris Gelfand, (Brazil) Gilberto Milos	
2002	9–22 Oct	Hyderabad, India	24	(India) Viswanathan Anand	(Uzbekistan) Rustam Kasimdzhanov	(Slovenia) Alexander Beliavsky, (Russia) Alexey Dreev	

Both tournaments began with a round-robin stage, consisting of four groups of six players each. The top two players from each group were subsequently seeded into an eight-player single-elimination bracket.

== FIDE World Cup (2005–present) ==
Since 2005, a different event of the same name has been part of the World Chess Championship cycle. This event is being held every two years. It is a 128-player knockout tournament, in the same style as the Tilburg tournament between 1992 and 1994, or the 1998, 1999, 2000, 2002 and 2004 FIDE World Championships.

The event was held in 2005, 2007, 2009, and 2011 in Khanty-Mansiysk, and subsequently FIDE has given preference to bids for the Olympiad that also contain a bid for the preceding World Cup. During the 2015 finals of the World Cup, the main organizer commented "We received the right to host the Olympiad and then we were given an additional event – the World Cup."

The Chess World Cup 2005 qualified ten players for the Candidates Tournament for the World Chess Championship 2007. Since then, every World Cup has qualified between one and three players for the Candidates Tournament.

Two World Cup qualifiers (Boris Gelfand in 2009 and Sergey Karjakin in 2015) won the subsequent Candidates tournament and played in the World Championship match, in 2012 and 2016 respectively.

=== Format ===
From 2005 to 2019, the format was 128 players with 7 single-elimination rounds of "mini-matches", which are 2 games each followed by a series of rapid then blitz tiebreaks if necessary. Since 2021, the World Cup has been expanded to 206 players playing 8 single-elimination rounds, with 50 players receiving a bye to the 2nd round. The final usually has 4 games before the tiebreaks start. Since 2015, an extra rest day has recently been added before the semi-finals, in addition to before the final.

Some criticism has been leveled at the scheduling effects, with the event being rather long (26 days), particularly with almost all of the players having left long before the end. Fatigue thus plays a critical role, and while some players seek to conserve energy by avoiding tiebreaks, others "agree" (either explicitly or implicitly) to make short draws in the 2 long games and decide the winner in tiebreaks. It is often remarked that the system is mostly a lottery of who survives, though better players have more chances on the whole. The anticlimax of the 4-round final, with both players now already qualified for the Candidates, has also been criticized.

=== Winners ===
"Qual" refers to the number of players who qualify for the Candidates Tournament (marked with green background). For example, in 2015, the top 2 finishers qualified for the 2016 Candidates Tournament. In 2021, Sergey Karjakin qualified for the 2022 Candidates Tournament via the World Cup, but was subsequently disqualified for making statements in support of the Russian invasion of Ukraine. In 2023, only the top three players were meant to qualify, but Magnus Carlsen declined to participate in the Candidates; thus the fourth place, Nijat Abasov, qualified as well.

Year	Dates	Host	Players	Qual.	Winner	Runner-up	Third place	Fourth place
2005	27 Nov – 17 Dec	Khanty-Mansiysk, Russia	128	10	(Armenia) Levon Aronian	(Ukraine) Ruslan Ponomariov	(France) Étienne Bacrot	(Russia) Alexander Grischuk
2007	24 Nov – 16 Dec	Khanty-Mansiysk, Russia	128	1	(United States) Gata Kamsky	(Spain) Alexei Shirov	(Norway) Magnus Carlsen and (Ukraine) Sergey Karjakin	
2009	20 Nov – 14 Dec	Khanty-Mansiysk, Russia	128	1	(Israel) Boris Gelfand	(Ukraine) Ruslan Ponomariov	(Ukraine) Sergey Karjakin and (Russia) Vladimir Malakhov	
2011	26 Aug – 21 Sep	Khanty-Mansiysk, Russia	128	3	(Russia) Peter Svidler	(Russia) Alexander Grischuk	(Ukraine) Vassily Ivanchuk	(Ukraine) Ruslan Ponomariov
2013	10 Aug – 4 Sep	Tromsø, Norway	128	2	(Russia) Vladimir Kramnik	(Russia) Dmitry Andreikin	(Russia) Evgeny Tomashevsky and (France) Maxime Vachier-Lagrave	
2015	10 Sep – 5 Oct	Baku, Azerbaijan	128	2	(Russia) Sergey Karjakin	(Russia) Peter Svidler	(Netherlands) Anish Giri and (Ukraine) Pavel Eljanov	
2017	2–27 Sep	(Georgia (country)) Tbilisi, Georgia	128	2	(Armenia) Levon Aronian	(China) Ding Liren	(United States) Wesley So and (France) Maxime Vachier-Lagrave	
2019	9 Sep – 4 Oct	Khanty-Mansiysk, Russia	128	2	(Azerbaijan) Teimour Radjabov	(China) Ding Liren	(France) Maxime Vachier-Lagrave	(China) Yu Yangyi
2021	12 Jul – 6 Aug	Sochi, Russia	206	2	(Poland) Jan-Krzysztof Duda	(Russia) Sergey Karjakin	(Norway) Magnus Carlsen	(Russia) Vladimir Fedoseev
2023	29 Jul – 25 Aug	Baku, Azerbaijan	206	3	(Norway) Magnus Carlsen	(India) R Praggnanandhaa	(United States) Fabiano Caruana	(Azerbaijan) Nijat Abasov
2025	31 Oct – 27 Nov	Goa, India	206	3	(Uzbekistan) Javokhir Sindarov	(China) Wei Yi	(FIDE) Andrey Esipenko	(Uzbekistan) Nodirbek Yakubboev

All tournaments since 2005 were played in single-elimination format, as seen in the format section above.

== See also ==
- Women's Chess World Cup
- Women's World Chess Championship, previously played with a similar format (knockout), but only 64 players.
- FIDE Grand Prix, another way to qualify for the Candidates Tournament
