= Mikhail Gurevich (chess player) =

Belgian chess grandmaster (born 1959)

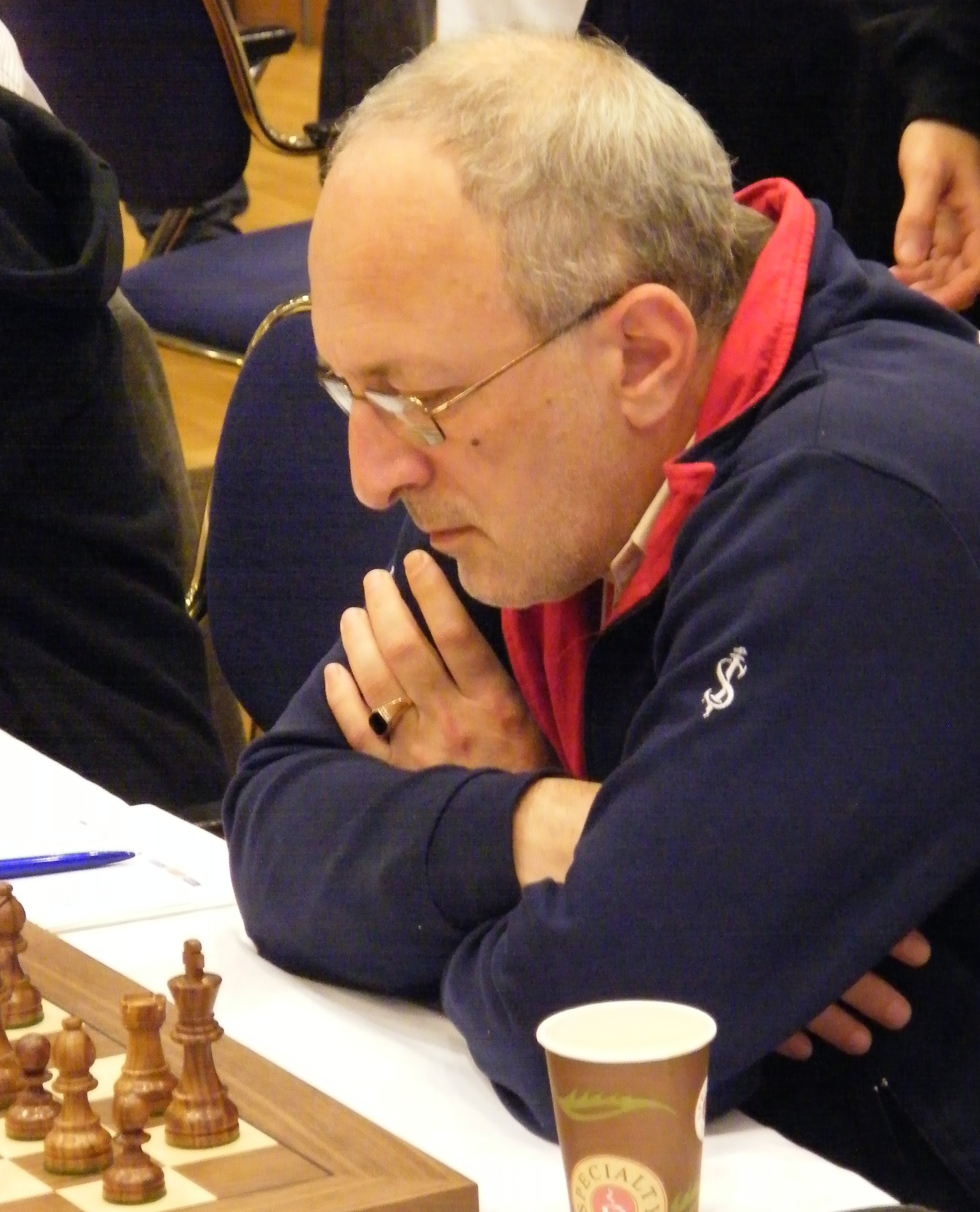
- Gurevich in 2008

Personal information
- Born: Mikhail Naumovich Gurevich; 22 February 1959 (age 67) Kharkiv, Ukrainian SSR, Soviet Union

Chess career
- Country: Soviet Union (until 1991); Belgium (1992–2005; since 2015); Turkey (2005–2015)
- Title: Grandmaster (1986)
- FIDE rating: 2533 (September 2026)
- Peak rating: 2694 (January 2000)
- Peak ranking: No. 5 (January 1990)

Mikhail Naumovich Gurevich (Russian: Михаил Наумович Гуревич, romanized: Mikhail Naumovich Gurevich; born 22 February 1959) is a Soviet-born Belgian chess player. He was a top ten ranked player from 1989 to 1991. Gurevich became an International Grandmaster in 1986, and is currently an FIDE arbiter and senior trainer.

== Chess career ==
=== Early years ===
Gurevich won the Ukrainian Chess Championship in 1984 and became USSR Champion in 1985, controversially taking the title from co-winners Alexander Chernin and Viktor Gavrikov on tiebreak points' This was after a three-way playoff had been organized and all the game results were draws. He was not allowed to leave the country, however, to participate in the Interzonal, and Gavrikov and Chernin went in his place. According to Gurevich, a Jew, the KGB prevented his journey to the West while they expected he would defect to Israel.

Gurevich was awarded the International Master title in 1985, and became an International Grandmaster in 1986. In 1987 he was first at Moscow ahead of Oleg Romanishin and Sergey Dolmatov. He finished second at Leningrad after Rafael Vaganian, but ahead of Andrei Sokolov and Artur Yusupov.

=== Peak ===
At his peak, between 1989 and 1991, Gurevich was consistently ranked in the top ten players in the world. He took first at Reggio Emilia 1989, ahead of Vassily Ivanchuk, Jaan Ehlvest and Viswanathan Anand and tied for first at Moscow 1990 with Alexander Khalifman and Evgeny Bareev. His highest world ranking was a tie for fifth place on the January 1990 and January 1991 FIDE rating lists (with ratings of 2645 and 2650 respectively).

=== Struggle and comeback ===
Mikhail Gurevich's results in the late 1990s were not as impressive as in previous years, but improved in the early 2000s. He achieved his highest rating of 2694 on the January 2001 rating list, ranking him 14th in the world. In 2001 he won the Belgian Chess Championship with a perfect 9/9 score.

He placed 8th at the 2005 FIDE World Cup, beating Robert Markus, Pavel Eljanov, Alexei Shirov and Vladimir Malakhov along the way, before losing to the eventual winner, Levon Aronian. This qualified him for the Candidates Tournament for the FIDE World Chess Championship 2007, in May–June 2007. He was eliminated in the first round by Peter Leko 3.5-0.5. In 2006, Gurevich won the Turkish Chess Championship.

In 2009 he tied for first with Michał Krasenkow at the World Chess Open in Leon.

== Team player ==
In team chess events, he represented the USSR at the 1989 Haifa European Team Chess Championship, winning team gold and individual bronze medals. In 1992, playing for Belgium, he had a fine result at the Manila Chess Olympiad, scoring 75% on board 1. In 2006, playing top board for his second adopted nation, Turkey, at the Turin Olympiad, he registered a respectable 58%.

== Expertise ==
Mikhail Gurevich was also a long-time second to eventual world champion Vishwanathan Anand in the 1990s. He is known as an expert on the French Defence, the Reshevsky variation of the Nimzo-Indian Defence, and the Petrosian variation of the Queen's Indian Defence. In 1991, he wrote a book on the latter, entitled Queen's Indian Defence: Kasparov System, published by Batsford.

In 2006, Gurevich was awarded the title of FIDE senior trainer. He holds the title of FIDE arbiter.

In the Fourth ACP World Rapid Cup knockout tournament, held 27–29 May 2010 in Odesa, Ukraine, Gurevich created a sensation after beating two grandmasters, each rated at over 2700.

== Personal life ==
Gurevich was born 22 February 1959 in Kharkiv, USSR. He lived in Belgium from 1991 to 2005 (after the breakup of the Soviet Union), and since 2006, resides in Turkey.

== Notable games ==
- Joel Lautier vs Mikhail Gurevich, 21 1993, English Opening: Anglo-Dutch Defense (A10), 0-1
- Mikhail Gurevich vs Normunds Miezis, Bonn GSK 1996, Budapest Gambit: Rubinstein Variation (A52), 1-0
- Sergei Movsesian vs Mikhail Gurevich, Sarajevo Bosnia 2000, French Defense: Advance, Euwe Variation (C02), 0-1
- Alexey Shirov vs Mikhail Gurevich, FIDE World Cup 2005, French Defense: Advance, Lputian Variation (C02), 0-1

== See also ==
- List of Jewish chess players
