= Peter Leko =

Hungarian chess grandmaster (born 1979)

- Leko at the 2026 Chess Olympiad

Personal information
- Born: September 8, 1979 (age 47) Subotica, Yugoslavia

Chess career
- Country: Hungary
- Title: Grandmaster (1994)
- FIDE rating: 2663 (November 2026)
- Peak rating: 2763 (April 2005)
- Ranking: No. 52 (November 2026)
- Peak ranking: No. 4 (April 2003)

Peter Leko (Hungarian: Lékó Péter; born September 8, 1979) is a Hungarian chess grandmaster and commentator. He became the world's youngest grandmaster in 1994. He narrowly missed winning the Classical World Chess Championship 2004: the match was drawn 7–7 and so Vladimir Kramnik retained the title. He also came fifth in the FIDE World Chess Championship 2005 and fourth in the World Chess Championship 2007.

Leko has achieved victories in many major chess tournaments, including the annual tournaments at Dortmund, Linares, Wijk aan Zee and the Tal Memorial in Moscow. He won two team silver medals and an individual gold medal representing Hungary at eight Chess Olympiads as well as team bronze and silver and an individual silver medal at three European Team Championships.

Leko has been ranked as high as fourth in the FIDE world rankings, which he first achieved in April 2003.

== Early years ==
Peter Leko was born into an ethnic Hungarian family in the city of Subotica, Yugoslavia, but moved to Szeged when he was one year old. He was taught chess by his father shortly before he turned seven and took part in tournaments from the age of nine. His first coach Tibor Károlyi began work with him in 1989, ending three months before Leko became a grandmaster. They later reunited in 1998 until the end of 2000. Leko also worked with IM Gaspar Mathe when he was ten years old.

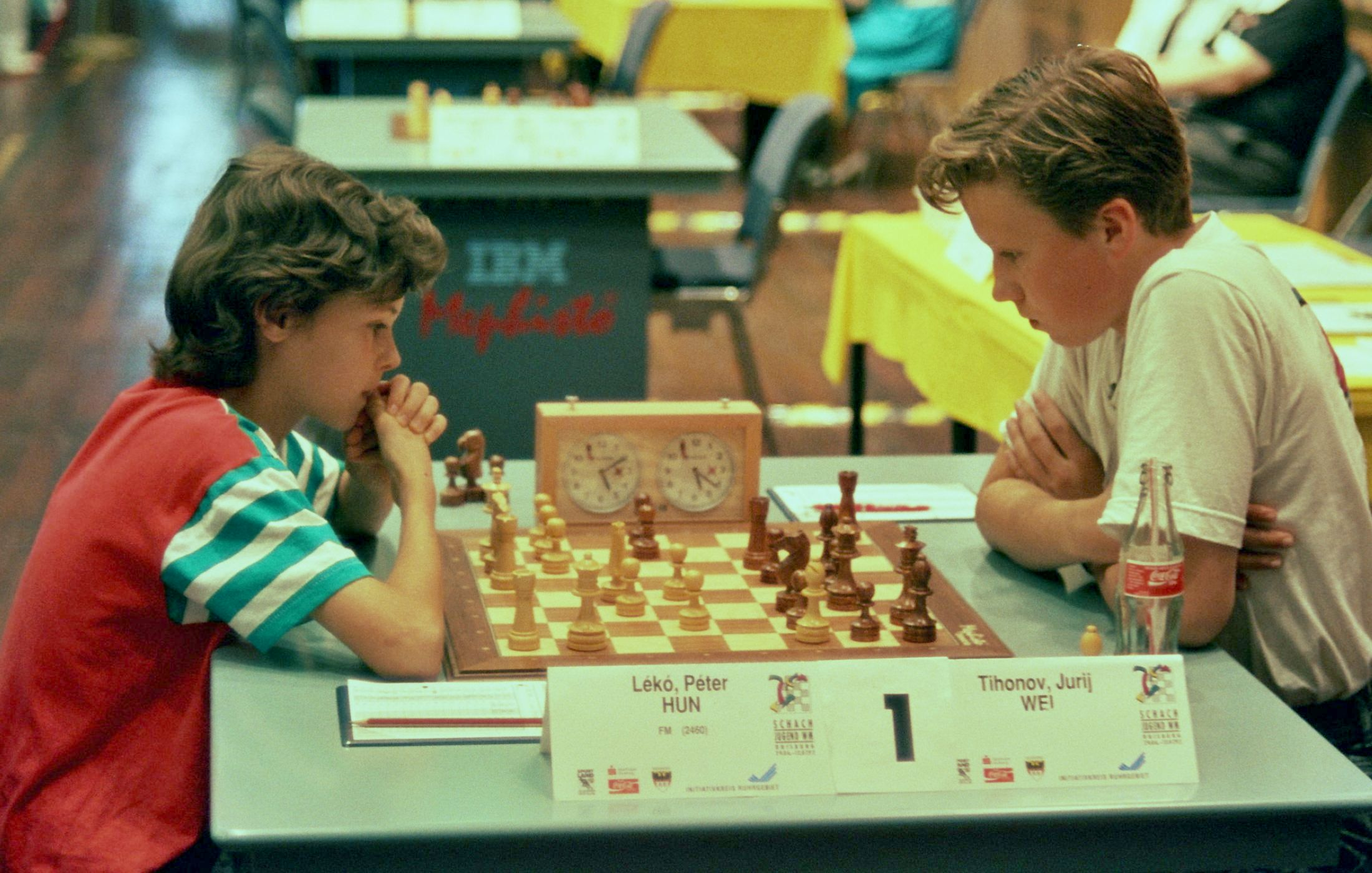
Leko-Tihonov 1992

As a junior, Leko competed in several age categories in the World Youth Chess Championship, winning bronze in the U10 in 1989, bronze in the U12 in 1990, fourth place in the U14 in 1992, silver in the U14 in 1993 and gold in the U16 in 1994.

Leko earned the International Master title in 1992. In 1994, he became a Grandmaster at the age of 14 years, 4 months and 22 days, at the time the youngest to have done so, breaking the record previously held by Judit Polgár. His norms came at a First Saturday tournament in Budapest and Leon (sharing third place with Anatoly Karpov and Veselin Topalov) in 1993, and shared third place at Hoogovens in 1994.

== Rising to the top ==
Leko showed his class in winning at Copenhagen in 1995 with 8 points out of 11 games. Soon after, Leko competed at Dortmund where he shared third place (5 points out of 9 games) with Vasyl Ivanchuk, backing up his new world ranking, placing him 55th with 2605 Elo. At Belgrade, a last round loss to Ivanchuk pushed him down to eighth place. He slipped to last place in Dortmund in 1996 but recovered with fourth place in Vienna (5/9). In 1997, Leko won in Cienfuegos (5/9) and Yopal (6½/9) and took fourth place at the traditional Tilburg chess tournament (7/11) establishing him as a rising star, climbing to 16th in the world rankings in the January 1998 list.

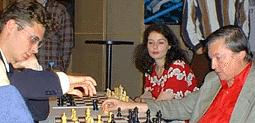
Leko analyses with Karpov, Dortmund 1999

Leko continued his rise up the rankings with second place (7/11) behind Viswanathan Anand at Tilburg in 1998, fourth place (5/9) in Dortmund and fourth place (6½/14) at Linares in early 1999. Leko's run of form culminated in achieving his first major tournament win (5/7) at Dortmund, half a point ahead of Vladimir Kramnik. It was at this tournament that he met his future wife, Sofia.

He made his first entry into World Championship tournaments at the FIDE World Chess Championship 1999 held in Las Vegas, defeating Christian Bauer 1½–½ but losing to eventual quarter-finalist Sergei Movsesian after rapid tiebreaks 2½–1½. In January 2000, Leko faced the winner, FIDE World Champion Alexander Khalifman in a six-game match held in Budapest, which he won 4½–1½.

Leko followed up his victory by sharing second place (8/13) with Kramnik and Anand at Corus behind a dominant Garry Kasparov, sharing last place (4½/10) at Linares and sharing second place (5/8) with Kramnik at Dortmund. At the FIDE World Chess Championship 2000 held in New Delhi (rounds 1–6) and Tehran (final), Leko was knocked out in the third round by Khalifman (4½–3½) after "sudden death" tiebreaks.

In 2001, Leko posted solid results in Corus (6½/13), Linares (4½/10), third place in Dortmund (5½/10) and winning an eight-game Chess 960 (Fischer Random Chess) match against Michael Adams at Mainz. The year was rounded off with an early exit in the second round of the FIDE World Chess Championship 2002, held in Moscow, at the hands of Ashot Anastasian (2½–1½) after rapid tiebreaks.

Leko started 2002 solidly with a sixth-place finish (7/13) at Corus, sharing third place (4½/9) in the NAO Masters held in Cannes and second place (7/9) at Essen behind Vadim Zvjaginsev.

== Classical World Championship Challenger ==
Under the terms of the Prague Agreement signed in May 2002, "The Dortmund winner will play the Classical World Chess Champion Vladimir Kramnik and the present FIDE World Champion Ruslan Ponomariov will play Garry Kasparov, the current World's number one rated player".

The Dortmund Chess Meeting was held in June 2002 with the format a two-stage event, with two-four player groups played as double round robins, with the two top players from each group progressing to a knockout stage determining the winner.

Leko qualified comfortably from the B Group in second place to Evgeny Bareev and faced Alexei Shirov in a four-game match. This ended early with the score 2½–½ in Leko's favour. In the final of the Tournament Leko met Veselin Topalov, who had been in good form in the run up to the tournament but had a draining match which had gone to tiebreaks against Bareev in the semi-finals. The match was won by Leko 2½–1½, ensuring he became the official challenger to Vladimir Kramnik for the Classical World Chess Championship 2004.

His Candidates triumph was followed up by leading the Hungarian team on board one to team silver in the 35th Chess Olympiad with an unbeaten run, along with sharing first (7/12) at Linares in early 2003 with Kramnik, half a point ahead of Anand and Kasparov, notably ending a ten super-tournament winning streak by Kasparov. This was shortly followed up by second place at the 12th Amber Melody tournament (Blind 6/11, Rapid 7½/11) a point behind Anand, and a solid result (5/9) in Budapest. At Dortmund, Leko disappointed with 4/10, considered to be due to the difficulties regarding the organising of the match with Kramnik.

2004 started brightly for Leko with shared second place (8/13) with Adams in Corus, half a point behind Anand and sharing second place (6½/12) with Kasparov in Linares, half a point behind Kramnik. He competed as part of an Armenia vs Rest of the World match, scoring 4/6 and finished in fourth place in Dortmund (held in the same format as the Candidates Tournament in 2002 but with play-offs for final positions).

== Classical World Championship Match ==
After several delays due to the collapse of the Einstein Group, who were originally to have organised the match, Leko contested the Classical World Chess Championship 2004 held from September 25 to October 18, 2004, in Brissago, Switzerland. Leko was helped by Vladimir Akopian, Arshak Petrosian and Vladislav Tkachiev.

In a match containing six games agreed as drawn before 25 moves, Leko lost the first game in dramatic fashion despite placing Kramnik's Petroff Defence under pressure after making a blunder in an unbalanced endgame where his Queen was slowly outmanoeuvred by Kramnik's pair of Rooks. Then followed two short draws and a hard-fought draw in Game 4 where Leko over-pressed with Black in a Ruy Lopez opening but Kramnik failed to take advantage of an extra pawn in the rook endgame.

Leko equalised the match score in Game 5 after switching his White opening from 1.e4 to 1.d4 playing a Queen's Gambit Declined line that Kramnik was familiar with. Kramnik allowed himself to enter a Rook and Bishop endgame a pawn down but with the likely result a draw. Leko used his pawns to press through the centre. Kramnik believed he could construct a fortress and save a draw but Leko managed to find a way to convert the win. In game six, a short draw was agreed after Kramnik declined a pawn sacrifice. In game seven, Leko was surprised by an unusual move order in the opening and simplified the position leading to a draw soon after, closing out the first half of the match with the score 3½–3½.

Kramnik–Leko, Game Eight

Position: c1 white bishop, a1 white rook, h2 white pawn, f2 white king, e2 black bishop, d2 white knight, b2 white pawn, g3 white pawn, f3 white pawn, d3 black queen, c3 white pawn, b3 white bishop, d4 white pawn, g5 black pawn, f6 black knight, d6 black bishop, c6 black pawn, a6 white pawn, h7 black pawn, f7 black pawn, g8 black king

Kramnik's preparation was refuted by Leko's sacrificial combination 26...Bxf3 27.Nxf3 Ne4+ 28.Ke1 Nxc3 29.bxc3 Qxc3+ 30.Kf2 Qxa1 31.a7 h6 32.h4 g4 White Resigns 0-1

In Game 8, Leko scored an important win, taking the match lead for the first time. For the first time Kramnik allowed Leko to play the aggressive Marshall Attack variation of the Ruy Lopez. Kramnik played a queen sacrifice and continuation which his team had believed via computer analysis to be fine for him. However, Leko exploited a hole in the preparation and by sacrificing material created a decisive advantage.

Between two short draws in Game 9 and 11, notable for Kramnik's change of opening with Black to Queen's Indian Defence, Game 10 saw Leko eventually finding a successful defence to Kramnik's opening advantage. That was enough to persuade Leko to change his opening with Black to the Caro-Kann for Game 12. Kramnik pressed but Leko found enough counterplay to repel him and secure a draw.

In the penultimate Game 13, in search of a win, Kramnik switched opening again with Black to the dynamic Benoni Defence and launched a kingside attack in the middlegame while Leko's pieces were on the queenside. Leko managed to liquidate the position to a tense Rook and pawn endgame where Leko's precise defence nullified Kramnik's advantage, leading to a draw.

In a dramatic final game, with Leko needing only a draw to secure the Championship, Kramnik chose the Advance variation against Leko's Caro-Kann and placed immediate pressure on Leko using a line played during the Tal–Botvinnik World Championship Match of 1961. Leko's plan to exchange off White's pieces and form a fortress did not work and Kramnik was able to break through the Black position. Leko resigned when checkmate was threatened. Under the rules of the match, with the score tied 7–7, Kramnik retained his title as Classical World Champion and would move on to an eventual reunification match against Veselin Topalov in 2006.

== Career after Brissago ==
Despite the drawn match, Leko maintained a high level in 2005, winning the Corus tournament with 8½/13. and finishing fourth at Linares (6/12). After taking a break, Leko attended the first Miskolc Rapid match against World No.7 Michael Adams in which Leko lost the first three games, won the next three and drew out the remaining two, ending the match 4-4. A 4/9 at Dortmund was followed by competing for the FIDE World Chess Championship title in San Luis, Argentina having qualified as most recent "Classical" challenger, finishing fifth with 6½/14. For more information, see FIDE World Chess Championship 2005.

In 2006, Leko scored solid results at Corus (tied 7th, 6½/14), Morelia-Linares (fifth, 7½/14), a 4½–3½ win in the Miskolc Rapid match against Anatoly Karpov, Dortmund (tied third, 4/7) and in sharing first place with 5½/9 at the inaugural Tal Memorial, he completed a career "Grand Slam" of major tournament victories at Dortmund, Linares, Corus and Tal Memorial. The next year, Leko struggled at Morelia-Linares tying for last place and lost the Miskolc Rapid match 4½–3½ against Vladimir Kramnik soon after.

Leko regained his form for the Candidates Matches held between 26 May and 13 June, held to select 4 players for the World Chess Championship 2007. The format was held as a 16-player two-round knockout tournament with each match best of six games. He comfortably won his matches against Mikhail Gurevich (+3−0=1) and Evgeny Bareev (+2−0=3), to qualify for the eight-player championship tournament. A few months later, he won the ACP World Rapid Chess Cup. Shortly after the World Chess Championship 2007 was held in Mexico City from 12 to 30 September as an 8-player double round robin. Leko finished in fourth place with 7/14 and rounded off the year tying for third place (4½/9) at the Tal Memorial.

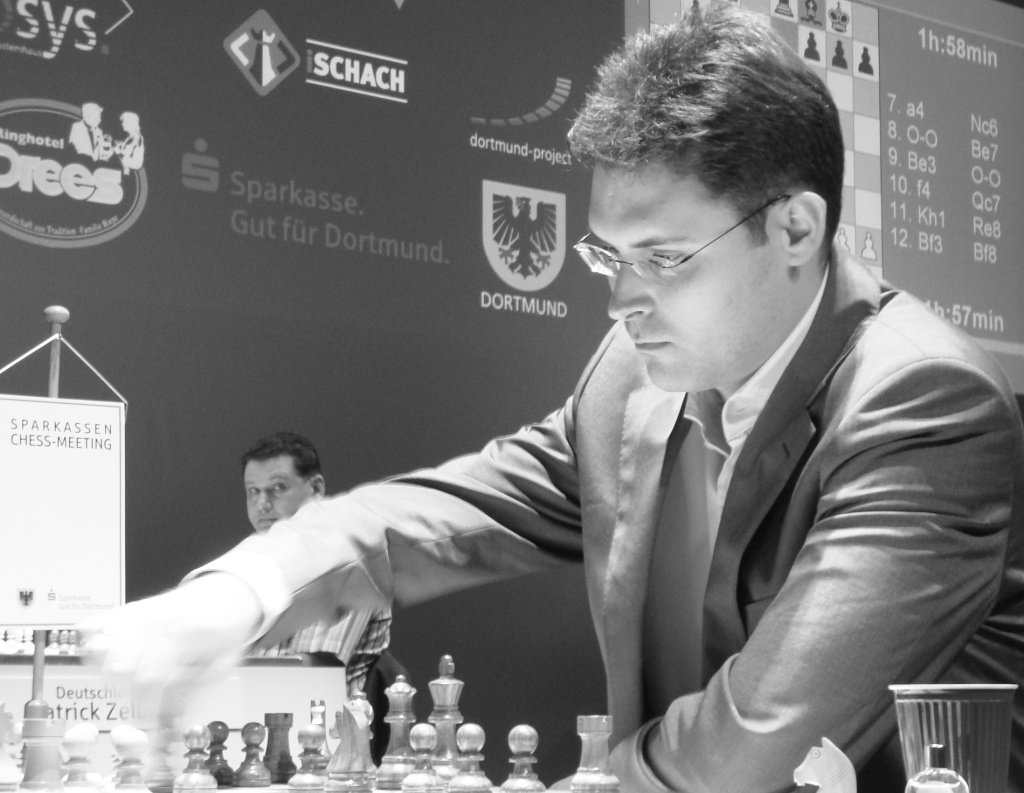
Peter Leko 2009

In 2008, Leko tied for fifth in a strong field at Corus with 7/13 but tied for last place in Morelia-Linares with 5½/14 and lost a Miskolc Rapid match 3½–4½ against 17-year-old Magnus Carlsen, but rebounded 4 months later with his third victory at Dortmund (after 1999 and 2002) with 4½/7, sixth place (4½/9) in a tough field at the Tal Memorial and securing individual gold on board 1 at the 38th Chess Olympiad held in Dresden.

Leko took part in the FIDE Grand Prix 2008–2010 which selected two players for the 2011 Candidates Tournament, electing to play in the four later tournaments in the 6-tournament cycle. In Elista, Russia, he shared fifth place with 6½/13, in Nalchik shared second with 7½/13, shared fourth at Jermuk with 7½/13 and shared seventh place at Astrakhan with 6½/13. With his weakest result at Astrakhan not counting towards his points tally, he finished in seventh place overall with 320 points, the highest final placing of a player who did not win an event. As he did not take part in the World Cup held in 2011, Leko did not progress to the Candidates Tournament.

Aside from the FIDE Grand Prix cycle, 2009 saw Leko lose a Miskolc Rapid match 3–5 against Viswanathan Anand, tie for second place with Magnus Carlsen and Dmitry Jakovenko with 5½/10 in a very strong Dortmund and finished in fourth place in Nanjing, China. He struggled at the Tal Memorial of 2009 scoring 3/9, broke even at Corus 2010 with 6½/13, lost what would be the final Miskolc Rapid match 3½–4½ against Boris Gelfand and came bottom of the Dortmund field with 4/10. After representing Hungary in the 39th Chess Olympiad in September he took several months away from chess.

He made his return to chess at the World Team Chess Championship held in Ningbo, China in July 2011 with an undefeated 5½/9 on board 1. This was followed up by a shock first round exit from the Chess World Cup 2011 against Sam Shankland and a third-place finish at the Saratov Governor's Cup. The year was rounded off with 5½/9 at the European Team Championships held in Halkidiki, Greece.

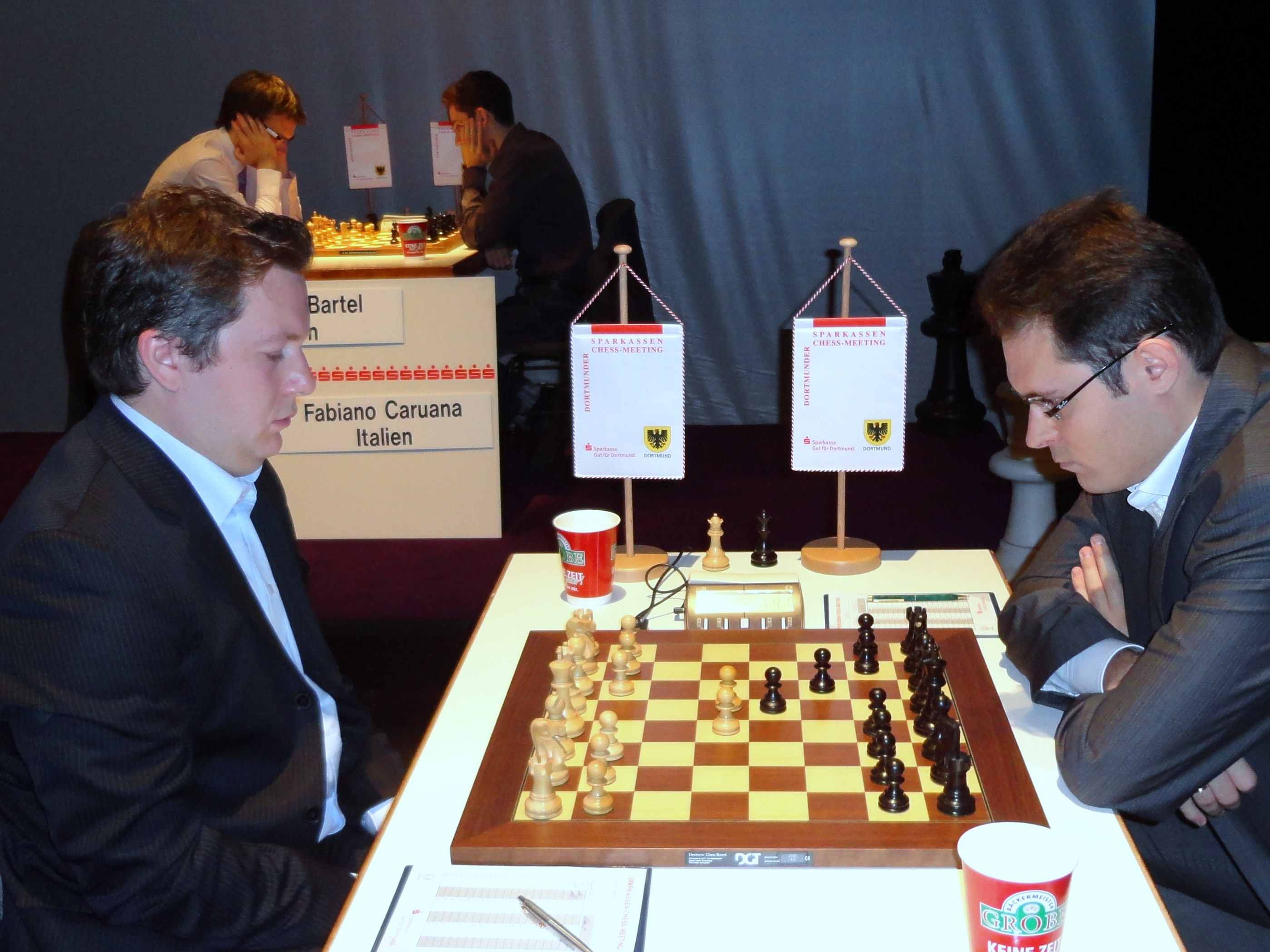
Naiditsch-Leko, Dortmund 2012

In April 2012, Leko scored 4/6 for Moscow's SHSM-64 team at the Russian Team Championships then came second with 5/7 at Sigeman & Co Tournament, half a point behind Fabiano Caruana. At Dortmund, Leko shared third place with Kramnik, Naiditsch and Ruslan Ponomariov, scoring 5½/9 and narrowly missed a win against tournament winner Caruana, followed up by scoring 5½/10 at the 40th Chess Olympiad, held in Istanbul.

In September 2012 he entered the FIDE Grand Prix 2012–13 as a nominee of AGON, who owned the rights to the World Championship cycle. At the first event, held in London, he finished in fifth place with an undefeated 6/11 and at the Tashkent event tied for seventh with a solid 5½/11 a month later. In April 2013 at the Zug event, he shared seventh place with Sergey Karjakin and Anish Giri scoring 5/11. After skipping the event held in Thessaloniki during the next month, he tied for third place with eventual series winner Veselin Topalov at the fifth event held in Beijing, scoring 6/11. Having completed his four tournaments in the cycle, Leko did not take part in the sixth and final event and finished the Grand Prix cycle in 13th place with 230 points (the result in Zug not counting towards his points tally).

Outside of the Grand Prix cycle, Leko helped the SHSM team secure third place at the European Chess Club Cup held in Eilat, Israel in October 2012, with a score of 3/6. Leko also took part in the World Mind Games finishing seventh with 3½/7 in the Rapid section and 6½/15 in the Blitz. He placed a strong fifth place at the Tata Steel Chess (formerly Corus) event in January 2013 with 7½/13. In April, he scored 3/6 for Ugra in the Russian Team Championships and in July, shared third with 4½/9 at Dortmund with Naiditsch. Leko tied for third with 5/9 at the Sherbank Rapid held in Kyiv in June. In August 2013, Leko was knocked out of the FIDE World Cup 2013 in the second round ½–1½ by Julio Granda, followed by scoring 4½/7 for sixth-placed Ugra at the European Club Cup held in Rhodes in October.

Leko finished the year at the World Mind Games with tied first in the Rapid section (losing out on head-to-head tiebreak) but tired with a 16th placed 11/30 in the Blitz section. In April 2014, Leko played in the Russian Team Championships for Malachite scoring 5/7, in July tied for second with 4/7 at Dortmund with Georg Meier and contributed to a team silver medal at the 41st Chess Olympiad with 5/10.

In August 2015, he played a 6-game match with Chinese Grandmaster Li Chao in the city of Szeged in Hungary. He lost the match +0-2=4.

Since November 2017, he has been coaching the German prodigy Vincent Keymer.

=== Team chess results ===
Leko first represented Hungary aged 15 years and two months at the 31st Chess Olympiad, going on to make nine more appearances at the Chess Olympiad, winning two team silvers and an individual gold, as follows:

Olympiad	Individual result	Team result
Moscow 1994	6½/10 (11th)	8th
Yerevan 1996	7/12 (33rd)	18th
Istanbul 2000	7½/12 (20th)	4th
Bled 2002	6/11 (48th)	Silver
Dresden 2008	7½/10 (Gold)	8th
Khanty-Mansiysk 2010	4½/10 (23rd)	4th
Istanbul 2012	5½/10 (17th)	9th
Tromso 2014	5/10	Silver
Batumi 2018	5/10	18th
Budapest 2024	5/9	11th

Leko also took part in numerous Team Chess Championships, both at World and European level (notably debuting at Debrecen in 1992 at the age of 13 years 2 months), with results as follows:

Event	Individual result	Team result
10th ETCC, Debrecen 1992	5/9 (13th)	5th
12th ETCC, Batumi 1999	6/9 (Silver)	Silver
5th WTCC, Yerevan 2001	3/7 (7th)	5th
18th ETCC, Halkidiki 2011	5½/9 (10th)	Bronze
8th WTCC, Ningbo 2011	5½/9 (5th)	5th

== Playing style ==
Peter Leko is known for playing in a solid and steady manner, avoiding risks. In his words, "I like to play in a “clean and clear” way, and I am definitely not the type of guy who takes unnecessary risks. I believe much more in the logic of our game rather than gambling on your opponent's nerves."

Jacob Aagaard commented, "Peter Leko has three essential qualities (that I know about). He has a great opening repertoire, he is a greatly gifted technical player and a very nice guy. If he had a good understanding of dynamics as well, he would have been one of the greatest players of our time (rather than just one game away from being World Champion!)." Despite criticism that his style leads to drawish chess, his consistent style has seen him remain in the elite since he was a teenager and win multiple elite-level tournaments.

Anand–Leko, 2005

Position: g1 white king, f1 white rook, d1 white queen, h2 white pawn, g2 white pawn, f2 white pawn, b2 white pawn, c3 white pawn, f4 black pawn, d4 black pawn, b4 white knight, e5 black pawn, d6 black queen, a6 white bishop, h7 black pawn, g7 black bishop, e7 black rook, b7 black bishop, a7 white rook, g8 black king, f8 black rook

Position after 26.Ba6? Leko (Black) punishes Anand's erroneous 26th move with a strong combination.

Leko has acted as a second in World Championship matches (for Anand vs Karpov in Lausanne 1997, for Kramnik vs Anand in Bonn 2008, for Anand vs Carlsen in Chennai 2013) due to his theoretical understanding in the openings phase of the game.

=== Sample game ===
On the way to winning the prestigious Corus chess tournament in 2005, Leko defeated Viswanathan Anand with the black pieces. The moves were:

1. e4 c5 2. Nf3 Nc6 3. d4 cxd4 4. Nxd4 Nf6 5. Nc3 e5 6. Ndb5 d6 7. Bg5 a6 8. Na3 b5 9. Bxf6 gxf6 10. Nd5 f5 11. c3 Bg7 12. exf5 Bxf5 13. Nc2 0-0 14. Nce3 Be6 15. Bd3 f5 16. 0-0 Ra7 17. a4 Ne7 18. Nxe7+ Rxe7 19. axb5 axb5 20. Bxb5 d5 21. Ra6 f4 22. Nc2 Bc8 23. Ra8 Qd6 24. Nb4 Bb7 25. Ra7 d4 26. Ba6? (see diagram)

Better was 26.Bc6 Bxc6 27.Rxe7 Qxe7 28.Nxc6 with approximate equality.

26... Bxg2! 27. Bc4+ Kh8 28. Ra6 Qc5 29. Kxg2 f3+ 30. Kh1 Qxc4 31. Rc6 Qb5 32. Rd6 e4 33. Rxd4 Bxd4 34. Qxd4+ Qe5 35. Qxe5+ Rxe5 36. Nc2 Rb8 37. Ne3 Rc5 38. h3 Rxb2 39. c4 Rg5 40. Kh2 Kg8 41. h4 Rg6 42. Kh3 Kf7 43. Nf5 Rc2 44. Ne3 Rd2 45. c5 Ke6 46. c6 Rg8 47. c7 Rc8 48. Kg3 Rxc7 49. Kf4 Rd4 50. Ra1 Rf7+ 51. Kg3 Rd8 52. Ra6+ Ke5 53. Ng4+ Kd5 54. Nf6+ Rxf6 55. Rxf6 Ke5 56. Rh6 Rg8+ 57. Kh3 e3 0–1

== Personal life ==
Leko is married to Sofia Petrosian, daughter of Armenian grandmaster Arshak Petrosian, who is also his trainer. Leko is a vegetarian.

Achievements
Preceded by Judit Polgár	Youngest chess grandmaster ever 1994–1997	Succeeded by Étienne Bacrot
