= Slim Belkhodja =

French chess grandmaster (born 1962)

Personal information
- Born: 23 November 1962 (age 63)

Chess career
- Country: France
- Title: Grandmaster (2002)
- Peak rating: 2531 (July 2001)

Slim Belkhodja (Arabic: سليم بلخوجة; born 23 November 1962) is a French chess Grandmaster (2002). He is the son of the painter Néjib Belkhodja

== Career ==
In 1985, he won the 58th Paris City Chess Championship. In 2001, he came first in the Arab Chess Championship. He took part in the FIDE World Chess Championship 2002, but was knocked out in the first round by Rafael Vaganian. In 2004, he tied for first place with Murtas Kazhgaleyev in the 27th Syre Memorial in Issy les Moulineaux. He played in the Chess World Cup 2005 and was knocked out in the first round by Sergei Tiviakov.

Belkhodja played for Tunisia in the Chess Olympiads of 1982, 1984, 2002, 2004, 2006 and 2008.
