= Carlos Matamoros Franco =

Ecuadorian chess grandmaster (born 1966)

Personal information
- Born: 17 December 1966 (age 59)

Chess career
- Country: Ecuador
- Title: Grandmaster (2002)
- Peak rating: 2555 (September 2011)

Carlos Matamoros Franco (born 17 December 1966), is an Ecuadorian chess Grandmaster (GM) (2002), Chess Olympiad individual gold (1982) and silver (1986) medalist.

== Biography ==
In 1981, Carlos Matamoros Franco won the bronze medal at the World Youth Chess Championship in the U16 age group. In 1986, he participated in the World Junior Chess Championship. In 2005, he participated in the Chess World Cup but lost to Victor Bologan in the first round.

Carlos Matamoros Franco is the winner of many international chess tournaments. He shared second place at the 1997 Capablanca Memorial. He has also won the Malaga Open international chess tournament four times (2001, 2005, 2007, 2010). He finished first in Seville's international chess tournament twice in a row (2002, 2003). In 2008, Carlos Matamoros Franco, along with Martha Fierro, won the gold medal at the World Mind Sports Games in the Mixed Pairs Blitz event.

Carlos Matamoros Franco has played for Ecuador in the Chess Olympiads many times:

- In 1982, on board three at the 25th Chess Olympiad in Lucerne (+6, =2, -1) and won the individual gold medal,
- In 1986, third reserve board at the 27th Chess Olympiad in Dubai (+8, =3, -2) and won the individual silver medal,
- In 1994, on board one at the 31st Chess Olympiad in Moscow (+6, =3, -3),
- In 2000, on board one at the 34th Chess Olympiad in Istanbul (+6, =4, -4),
- In 2002, on board one at the 35th Chess Olympiad in Bled (+1, =11, -2),
- In 2004, on board one at the 36th Chess Olympiad in Calvià (+5, =7, -0),
- In 2006, on board one at the 37th Chess Olympiad in Turin (+2, =8, -0),
- In 2008, on board one at the 38th Chess Olympiad in Dresden (+5, =5, -1),
- In 2010, on board one at the 39th Chess Olympiad in Khanty-Mansiysk (+2, =3, -4),
- In 2012, on board one at the 40th Chess Olympiad in Istanbul (+5, =4, -1),
- In 2014, on board one at the 41st Chess Olympiad in Tromsø (+3, =4, -2),
- In 2016, on board one at the 42nd Chess Olympiad in Baku (+6, =0, -3),
- In 2018, on board one at the 43rd Chess Olympiad in Batumi (+4, =4, -1).

Carlos Matamoros Franco played for Ecuador on board one at the 2003 Pan American Team Chess Championship in Rio de Janeiro (+2, =0, -1) and won the team bronze and individual gold medals.

Carlos Matamoros Franco played for Ecuador in the World Youth U26 Team Chess Championship:

- In 1985, on board one at the 5th World Youth U26 Team Chess Championship in Mendoza (+5, =4, -0).

In 1987, he was awarded the FIDE International Master (IM) title and in 2002 he received the FIDE Grandmaster (GM) title. Carlos Matamoros Franco was the first Ecuadorian chess player to become a Grandmaster.
