= Gastón Needleman =

Argentine chess player

Personal information
- Born: February 22, 1990 (age 36) Mendoza, Argentina

Chess career
- Country: Argentina
- Title: International Master (2007)
- FIDE rating: 2429 (August 2026)
- Peak rating: 2437 (January 2007)

Gastón Needleman (born 1990) is a former chess player from Mendoza, Argentina. He attended high school at Escuela de Comercio Martin Zapata.

== Chess career ==
At the age of 15, he scored 8.0/11 to tie with six other players for second place in the American Continental Championship, Buenos Aires, August 5–16, 2005. Needleman, who with an Elo rating of 2242 was untitled at the time of the tournament, was seeded 99th. He defeated GM Alexander Shabalov with black in round 10 and drew with GM Gata Kamsky in the final round, preventing Kamsky from taking first place.

The top seven finishers in the American Continental Championship were to gain paid entry to the FIDE World Cup, part of the 2005–2007 World Chess Championship cycle. The tournament winner, Lázaro Bruzón, received the first invitation, but a tie-break tournament was needed between the seven second-place finishers Julio Granda Zuniga, Alexander Onischuk, Gilberto Milos, Gata Kamsky, Rubén Felgaer, Giovanni Vescovi and Gastón Needleman to see who would be left out. The rapid-play time control tie-break tournament created controversy, as it appeared to some observers that the higher-rated GMs agreed to short draws with each other in order to conserve energy but fought hard in games against Needleman in order to wear him down and ensure that he would finish last.

With each player having 15 minutes plus 10 seconds per move to finish each game and only 5 minutes between games, after a grueling 5 hour session Needleman finished eighth. Apart from the games played by Needleman, there was only one decided game, the rest ended in a draw.

Needleman later said he did not think there was a conspiracy against him. Following a request from Dr. Alberto Rodriguez Saa, Governor of San Luis, Argentina, FIDE President Kirsan Ilyumzhinov granted Needleman a paid World Cup invitation.
