= Ali Farahat =

Egyptian-American chess player and trainer (born 1975)

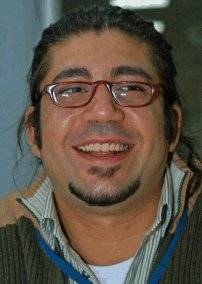
- Farahat in 2005

Personal information
- Born: August 22, 1975 (age 50)

Chess career
- Country: Egypt (until 2019); United States (since 2019)
- Title: International Master (2005)
- FIDE rating: 2327 (July 2023)
- Peak rating: 2424 (May 2017)

Ali Farahat (until 2014 written Ali Frhat; born August 22, 1975) is an Egyptian and American chess player who received the FIDE title of International Master (IM) in 2005. He won the Egyptian chess championship in 2014. Since April 2019, he plays for the United States Chess Federation.

== Biography ==
He was joint third at the African Chess Championship in Lusaka in 2005. He was awarded the title International Master for this achievement and qualified for the Chess World Cup 2005 in Khanty-Mansiysk where he lost in the first round against Levon Aronian. He was third at the African Chess Championship again in Windhoek 2014. In the Egyptian Individual Championships he came second in Alexandria in 2013 and won the competition 2014 in Cairo.

For the Egyptian national team he played at the Chess Olympiads 2006 and 2008 with an overall score of 7 points in 14 games. Furthermore, he took part in the World Team Championships 2015 and 2017. At the World Team Championship 2017 he was scoring a norm for achieving the title of Grandmaster.

His club in Egypt was Al-Sharqiya Dukhan. With Al-Sharqiya he won the Arab Club Championship 2007 in Khartoum and 2015 in Agadir. With Al-Hawar he won the African Club Championship in Cairo in 2017, winning all his 7 games on 5th board with an Elo performance of 2910, having the best result on 5th board of all players taking part in this competition.

As chess coach he trained Kareim Wageih, who won the 2007 African Junior Chess Championship in Kasungu District, Malawi. In the United Arab Emirates he has been coach at the Dubai Chess Club and the Fujairah Chess Club. He was team captain of the Egyptian women's team at that Chess Olympiad 2016. Ali Farahat holds the title of FIDE Instructor (awarded in 2005) and FIDE Trainer (awarded in 2013).
