= Étienne Bacrot =

French chess grandmaster (born 1983)

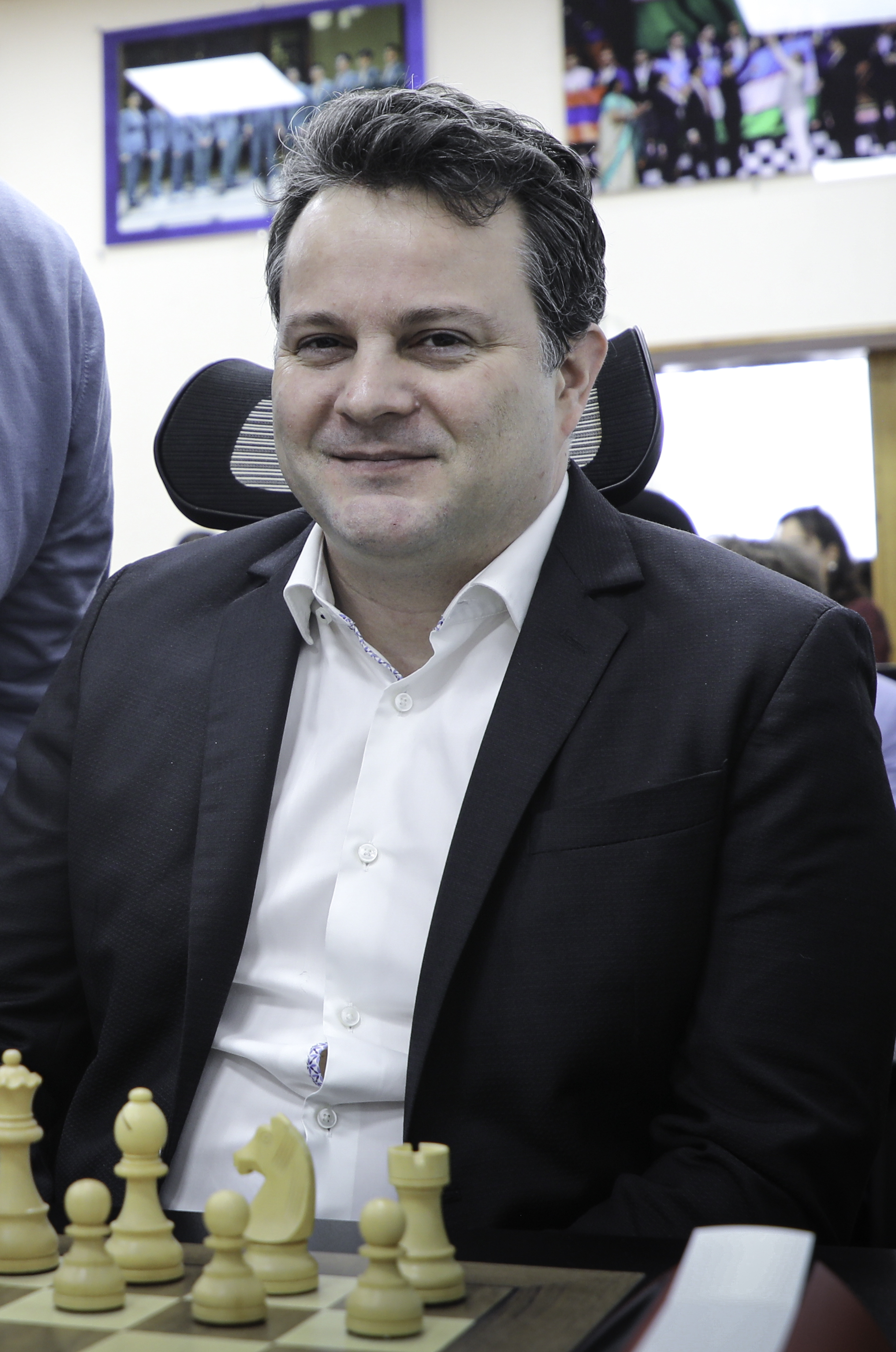
- Bacrot in 2026

Personal information
- Born: 22 January 1983 (age 43) Lille, France

Chess career
- Country: France
- Title: Grandmaster (1997)
- FIDE rating: 2619 (August 2026)
- Peak rating: 2749 (November 2013)
- Peak ranking: No. 9 (January 2005)

Étienne Bacrot (French pronunciation: [etjɛn bakʁo]; born 22 January 1983) is a French chess grandmaster, and as a child, a chess prodigy.

He competed at the Candidates Matches in 2007 and won the Aeroflot Open in 2009. He passed 2700 FIDE rating in 2004 and in January 2005 he became the first French player to enter the top 10.

Bacrot won an individual bronze medal at the 37th Chess Olympiad in 2006 for his performance on board one, as well as four medals at the World Team Championships.

== Chess career ==
He started playing at age 4. By 10, Bacrot was winning junior competitions, and in 1996, at 13 years of age, he won against Vasily Smyslov. He became a Grandmaster in March 1997 at the age of 14 years and 2 months, making him the youngest person at the time to have held the title until Ruslan Ponomariov took the record that December. He was previously coached by Josif Dorfman.

Bacrot served as one of the four advisors to the world team in the 1999 Kasparov versus the World event.

He has a son, Alexandre, and a daughter, Victoria, with Nathalie Bonnafous.

In 2023, Bacrot took part in the Chess World Cup in Baku as the 52nd seed, making it to the fourth round after defeating Nay Lin Tun, Aleksandar Indjic and the 13th seed Yu Yangyi from China, before losing to Indian GM Vidit Gujrathi. He, then, participated in the FIDE Grand Swiss 2023, where he scored 6,5/11 and was in contention for a top 2 finish until round 8, when he lost against Fabiano Caruana after blundering in time pressure. In this strong tournament, he beat Belgian GM Daniel Dardha, German GM Niclas Huschenbeth and 2720-rated GM Yu Yangyi, with a TPR of 2749. After the Grand Swiss, Bacrot played on board 1 for France in the European Team Chess Championship, scoring 4/8 as France finished in seventh place.

== Annual hometown game ==
Bacrot has played several matches against prominent players in his home town of Albert. In 1996, he beat Vasily Smyslov 5–1, in 1997 lost to Viktor Korchnoi 4–2, in 1998 defeated Robert Hübner 3½–2½, in 1999 lost to Alexander Beliavsky 3½–2½, in 2000 lost to Nigel Short 4–2, in 2001 tied 3–3 with Emil Sutovsky, in 2002 beat Boris Gelfand 3½–2½, and in 2004 (there was no match in 2003) won against Ivan Sokolov 3½–2½.

== Notable results ==
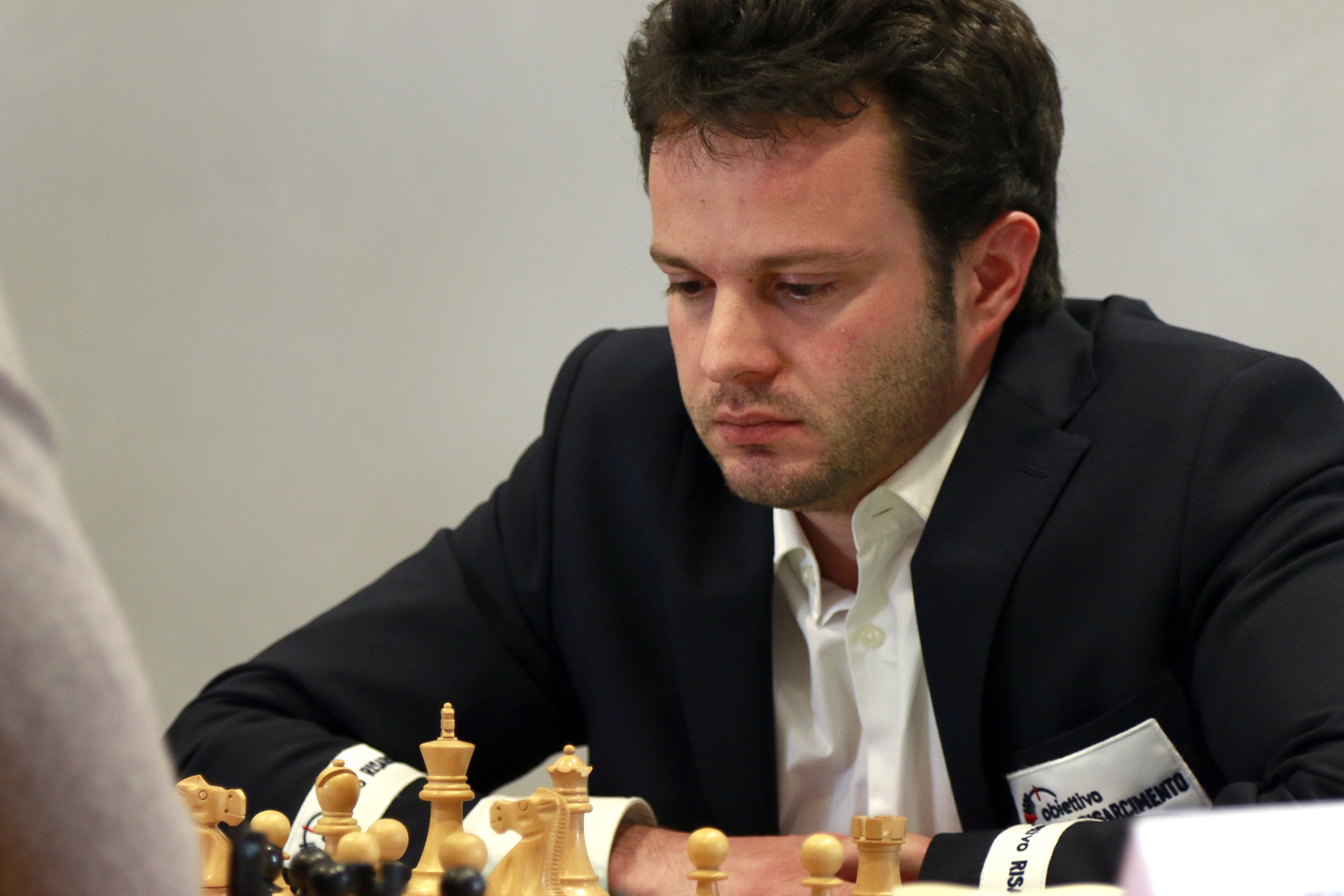
Bacrot, Italian Team Championship, Civitanova Marche, 29 April/3 May 2015

- Nine times French champion (becoming at 16 years old the youngest French champion ever) with five in a row from 1999 to 2003 and then in 2008, 2012, 2017 and 2026.
- Beat Boris Gelfand at 19 years old 3½–2½ and Ivan Sokolov at 21 years old 3½–2½ in Albert.
- Beat Judit Polgár 3–1 in a rapid match at age 16 years old in Bastia, tied Anatoly Karpov in a rapid match 3–3 at 17 years old.
- Won Enghien-les-Bains tournament in 1997 ahead of Viktor Korchnoi doing his final GM norm at 14 years old and 4 months.
- Won Lausanne young masters in 1999 beating Ruslan Ponomariov in final.
- Qualified for the quarter-final of the world rapid chess championships in 2003 in Cap d'Agde.
- Accomplished an 11/11 score in French team championship in 2004.
- Won Petrosian memorial with the world team in 2004 with the tied 3rd individual performance.
- Won Karpov Poikovsky tournament in 2005 ahead of Viktor Bologan, Alexander Grischuk, Peter Svidler and Alexey Dreev.
- Finished third at Dortmund Sparkassen in 2005.
- Finished third at the 2005 FIDE world cup beating Alexander Grischuk for bronze. This qualified him for the Candidates Tournament of the FIDE World Chess Championship 2007 in May–June 2007, although he would have qualified on rating anyway. However, he was eliminated from the Candidates in the first round of matches, losing 3½–½ to Gata Kamsky.
- Won the 2006 FiNet Chess960 Open with a 9½/11 score.
- Won the 2008 French Championship.
- Won the 2009 Aeroflot Open.
- Third at the 2010 Nanjing tournament behind Carlsen and Anand.
- Won 2011 Poikovsky Karpov tournament with 5½/9 ahead of Sergey Karjakin, Fabiano Caruana, Dimitry Jakovenko.

== Team results ==
- European team chess championship playing with France: 2nd in 2001, 3rd in 2005 and 2nd in 2021.
- Many times French team champion and European club champion with Nao chess club.

== Youth results ==
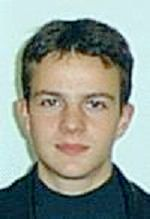
Bacrot (1999)

- World champion in under-10 years old category.
- World champion in under-12 years old category.
- Beat Levon Aronian in a match in Albert.
- IM at 12 years old.
- GM at 14 years old, setting a new record at that time.

== Rankings ==
- Ranked No. 9 in the world in every 2005 FIDE list, playing 55 games.

Achievements
Preceded by Peter Leko	Youngest chess grandmaster ever March–December 1997	Succeeded by Ruslan Ponomariov
