= Martin Zapata High School =

School in Mendoza, Argentina

- Escuela de Comercio Martín Zapata

Location
- Mendoza, Argentina; Pedro Molina Street and Peru street
- Coordinates: 32.896576°S 68.849750°W

Information
- Type: Public, Secondary
- Established: 29 Junio 1912
- Dean: Lic. Cristian Gamba
- Information: +54 (261) 4239315
- Website: http://mzapata.uncu.edu.ar

The Martin Zapata High School (Spanish: Escuela de Comercio Martin Zapata) is one of the six high schools depending on the National University of Cuyo. It is located in Mendoza, Argentina. It was named after the delegate in the 1853 Argentine constitutional convention Martin Zapata.
