= Evgeny Bareev =

Russian-Canadian chess grandmaster (born 1966)

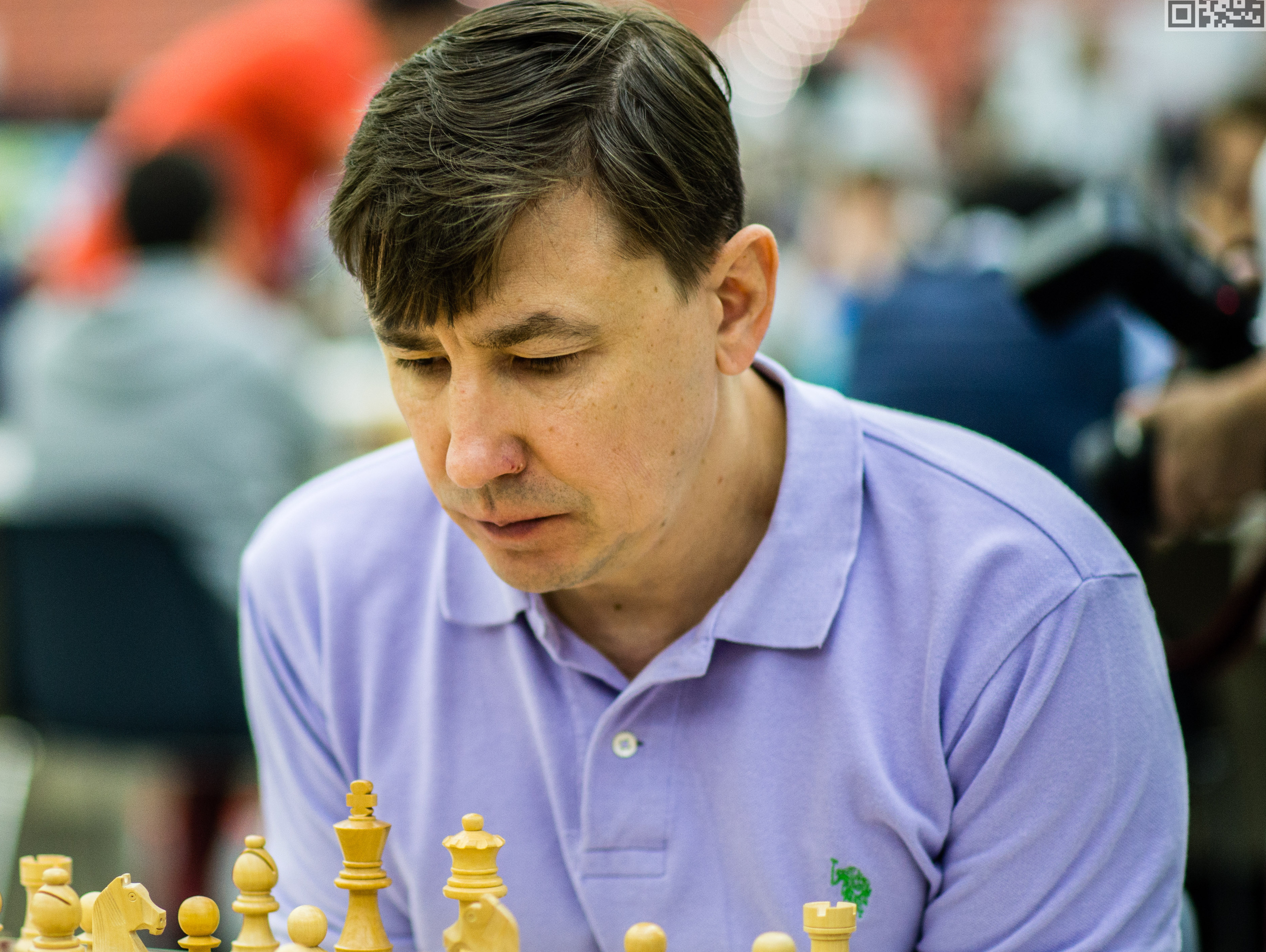
- Bareev in 2016

Personal information
- Born: Evgeny Ilgizovich Bareev; 21 November 1966 (age 60) Yemanzhelinsk, Russian SFSR, Soviet Union

Chess career
- Country: Soviet Union → Russia (until 2015); Canada (since 2015)
- Title: Grandmaster (1989)
- FIDE rating: 2611 (November 2026)
- Peak rating: 2739 (October 2003)
- Peak ranking: No. 4 (July 1991)

Evgeny Ilgizovich Bareev (Russian: Евгений Ильгизович Бареев; born 21 November 1966) is a Russian-Canadian chess player, trainer, and writer. Awarded the FIDE Grandmaster title in 1989, he was ranked fourth in the world in the international rankings in 1992 and again in 2003, with an Elo rating of 2739.

== Chess career ==
Bareev was world under 16 champion in 1982. In 1992 he graduated from the chess faculty of the Moscow Institute of Physical Culture.

His greatest success was winning the elite Corus Tournament at Wijk aan Zee in 2002. At this event he scored 9/13 points, ahead of top players such as Alexander Grischuk, Michael Adams, Alexander Morozevich, and Peter Leko.

Bareev was a three-time winner of the Premier Tournament at the annual Hastings Chess Congress in 1990/91, 1991/92 and 1992/93, shared with Judit Polgár; the event was then still staged as an invitational tournament in round-robin format. He also won the strong Enghien-les-Bains tournament held in France in 2003. In a man versus machine contest in January 2003, Bareev took on the chess program HIARCS in a four game-match: all four games were drawn.

He was a second to Vladimir Kramnik in the Classical World Chess Championship 2000 against Garry Kasparov. With Ilya Levitov, Bareev wrote From London to Elista, a book on the championship as well as Kramnik's subsequent championship matches against Peter Leko and Veselin Topalov; it received the Book of the Year award from the English Chess Federation in 2008.

Bareev was a finalist of the World Cup 2000, where he lost to Viswanathan Anand, and of the Rapid World Cup 2001, where he lost to Kasparov.

His most notable participation in World Chess Championship events was the Candidates Tournament for the Classical World Chess Championship 2004 in Dortmund 2002. Bareev reached the semifinals, but lost his match against Topalov.

At the Chess World Cup 2005, Bareev qualified for the Candidates Tournament for the World Chess Championship 2007, played in May–June 2007. He won his match against Judit Polgár (+2-1=3), but was eliminated after losing his second-round match to Peter Leko (+0-2=3).

In 2010, he tied for first with Konstantin Chernyshov, Lê Quang Liêm and Ernesto Inarkiev in the Moscow Open.

In 2015, Bareev, who had moved to Toronto in 2006, transferred his FIDE membership from the Russian to the Canadian Chess Federation.

In 2019, he won the Canadian Zonal Championship, thereby qualifying for the FIDE World Cup. He lost to Rustam Kasimdzhanov in the first round. Bareev shared equal first with Razvan Preotu at the 2021 Zonal Championship. At the World Cup, he defeated Daniel Quizon in the first round, but then lost to Aryan Tari.

Best results:

- 1982 Guayaquil (U16 World Ch.) – 1st place
- 1985 Kharkov (USSR Ch., 1st league) – 1st place
- 1986 Kiev (USSR Ch.) – 2nd – 7th place
- 1986 Gausdal (U20 World Ch.) – 3rd – 5th place
- 1987 Vrnjacka Banja – 1st – 2nd place
- 1988 Budapest – 1st place
- 1989 Trnava – 1st place
- 1989 Moscow (Ch.) – 1st place
- 1990 Rome Open – 2nd – 6th place
- 1990 Dortmund Open – 1st place
- 1990 Leningrad (USSR Ch.) – 1st – 4th place
- 1990/91 Hastings – 1st place
- 1991 Biel – 2nd place
- 1991 Bled/Rogaska Slatina – 2nd place
- 1991/92 Hastings – 1st place
- 1992 Dortmund – 3rd place
- 1992/93 Hastings – 1st – 2nd place
- 1994 Pardubice GM – 1st place
- 1994 Tilburg – 2nd place
- 1995 Wijk-aan-Zee – 2nd place
- 1995 Leon – 1st – 2nd place
- 1995 Elista (Russian Ch.) – 1st -5th place
- 1996 Belgrade (terminated after first leg) – 1st place
- 1996 Vienna Open – 1st – 8th place
- 1997 Elista (Russian Ch.) – 2nd place
- 1999 Sarajevo Bosna – 2nd – 3rd place
- 2000 Montecatini Terme – 2nd place
- 2000 Shenyang, FIDE World Cup – 2nd place
- 2001 Cannes, World Cup (rapid) – 2nd place
- 2002 Dortmund (Einstein Candidates) – semifinals
- 2002 Moscow, Russia – The World (Rapid) – 1st-2nd result for Team Russia
- 2002 Wijk aan Zee – 1st place
- 2002 Warsaw (rapid) – 1st place
- 2003 Wijk-aan-Zee – 3rd place
- 2003 Enghien-les-Bains – 1st place
- 2003 Моnaco (rapid) – 1st place
- 2004 Monaco (rapid) – 2nd place
- 2005 Kazan (Russian Ch., Major League) – 1st – 2nd place
- 2006 Poikovsky – 2nd – 5th place
- 2006 Havana, Capablanca Memorial – 2nd place
- 2008 Leon (rapid) – 1st place
- 2009 Saint Petersburg (Russian Cup) – 1st place
- 2010 Moscow-open – 1st – 4th place
- 2019 Canadian Zonal Championship - 1st place
- 2021 Canadian Zonal Championship - 1st - 2nd place

=== Team competitions ===
Bareev was a member of the Soviet national team at the 1990 Chess Olympiad and of the Russian national team at the Chess Olympiads of 1994, 1996, 1998 and 2006. He won the team gold medal in 1990, 1994, 1996 and 1998. He played on the Canadian team at the Olympiads in 2016 and 2018. Bareev is also a two-time winner of the World Team Chess Championship (1997, 2005) and a two-time winner of the European Team Chess Championship (1992, 2003).

Bareev is a four-time winner of the European Club Cup with three clubs: Lion of France (1994), Ladia of Russia (1997) and Bosna of Bosnia and Herzegovina (1999, 2000).

== Trainer ==
In 2006, Bareev organized a grandmaster school for top Russian junior players and headed it until 2010. In 2009 he worked with Lê Quang Liêm, who became World Blitz Champion in 2013.

In 2010-11, Bareev was the head coach of the Russian men's chess team. During that time the team won the silver medal at the 2010 Chess Olympiad. Between 2010 and 2014, he was the head coach of Russia's junior, men's and women's national teams.

In recent years, he has coached outstanding young Canadian players such as Razvan Preotu and Michael Song, as well as the Vietnamese grandmaster, Liem Le.

== Publications ==
- Bareev, Evgenij (1995). C05-06: French Defence, Tarrasch Variation. Chess Informant. OCLC 41477853.
- Bareev, Evgeny; Levitov, Ilya (2007). From London to Elista: The Inside Story of the World Chess Championship Matches that Vladimir Kramnik Won Against Garry Kasparov, Peter Leko, and Veselin Topalov. New In Chess. ISBN 978-90-5691-219-2. OCLC 1105229665.
- Song, Michael; Preotu, Razvan; Bareev, Evgeny (foreword) (2017). The Chess Attacker's Handbook. Gambit Publications. ISBN 978-1-911465-16-4. OCLC 992564403.
- Bareev, Evgeny (2019). Say No to Chess Principles!. Thinkers Publishing. ISBN 978-94-92510-51-8. OCLC 1113865551.
