= World Chess Championship 2007 =

Chess championship held in Mexico City

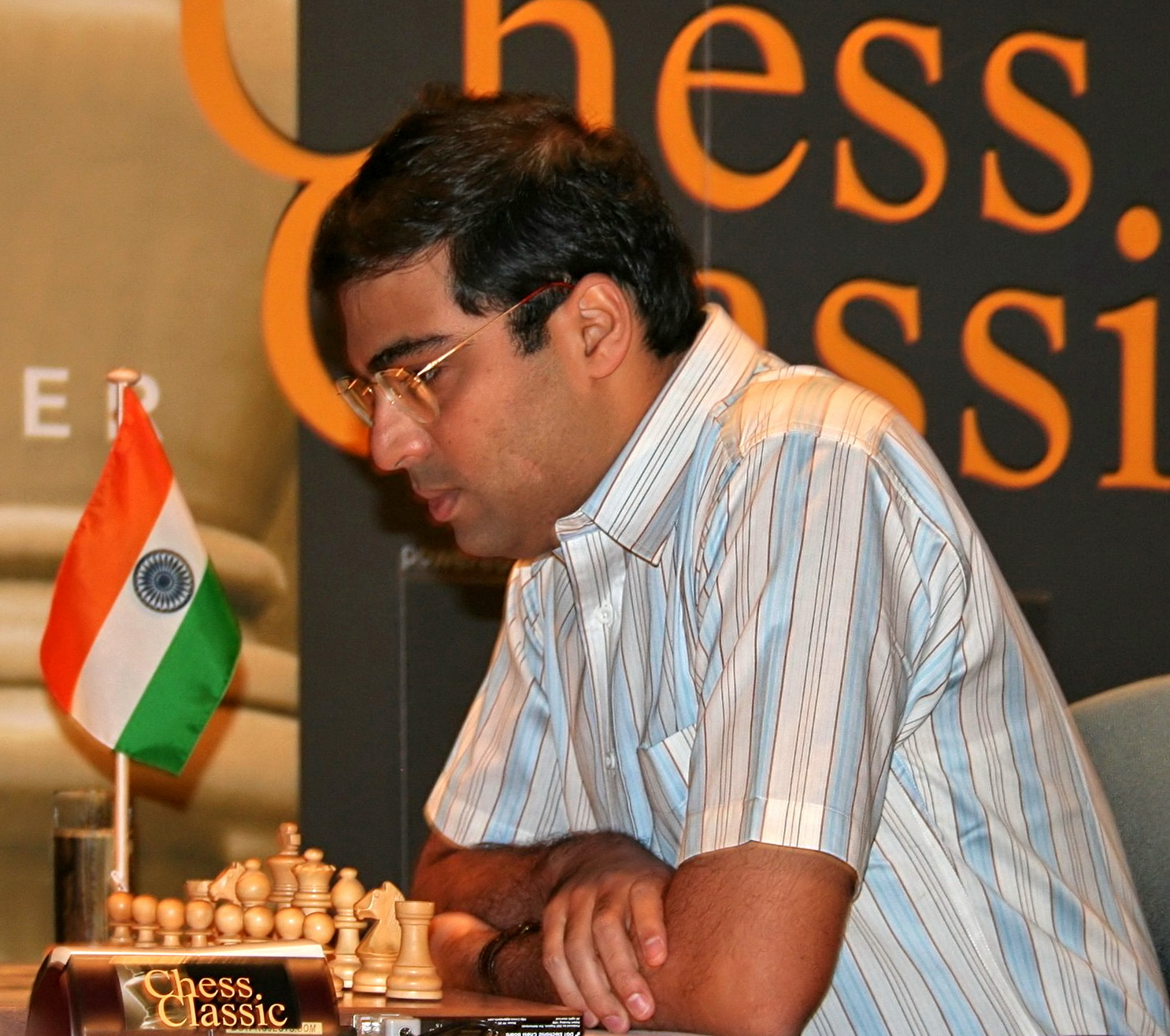
- Viswanathan Anand, winner of the World Chess Championship 2007.
- Location: Mexico City, Mexico
- Dates: 12–30 September 2007
- Organizing body: FIDE
- Competitors: 8 from 5 nations
- Winning score: 9 points of 14

Champion
- (India) Viswanathan Anand

The World Chess Championship 2007 was an eight-player double round-robin chess tournament played to determine the new World Chess Champion. The tournament was held under the auspices of FIDE in Mexico City, Mexico from 12 to 30 September 2007. Although the World Championship title was reunified in the previous World Championship match, the championship was unusually decided in a tournament rather than a match. Nonetheless, it featured the participation of reigning World Champion Vladimir Kramnik.

World No. 1 Viswanathan Anand won the tournament with an undefeated score of 9/14 (+4–0=10), a full point ahead of Kramnik and Boris Gelfand. With this result, Anand won his first undisputed World Championship and became the 15th undisputed World Champion.

== Background ==
This championship was unusual in that the World Chess Championship was decided by a tournament rather than a match.

The FIDE World Chess Championship 2005 was also a double round robin tournament, but at the time the world title was split, with that tournament being for the FIDE world championship, and with Classical World Champion Vladimir Kramnik refusing to take part. Soon after the 2005 tournament, FIDE announced that the 2007 World Championship would also be a double round robin tournament.

In April 2006, FIDE announced the World Chess Championship 2006, to reunify the world chess championship. Because the organization of the 2007 tournament was largely in place, conditions of that match included:

- If Classical champion (Kramnik) defeated FIDE Champion Veselin Topalov, Kramnik would take Topalov's place in the 2007 tournament.
- The 2007 tournament would be a world championship.

Kramnik won the 2006 match. In June 2007, Kramnik confirmed that he recognized the 2007 tournament as the world championship, while expressing a personal preference for the championship to be decided by a match.

FIDE later announced that future world championships (beginning with the World Chess Championship 2008) would be decided by matches between the champion and a challenger. At the same time FIDE announced that, as compensation for being denied entry to the 2007 tournament, Topalov would have special privileges in the World Chess Championship 2010 cycle.

== Participants ==
Qualification path	Player	Rating	Rank	Age
Reigning World Champion	Vladimir Kramnik (RUS)	2769	3	32
Joint 2nd place in the FIDE World Championship 2005	Viswanathan Anand (IND)	2792	1	37
Joint 2nd place in the FIDE World Championship 2005	Peter Svidler (RUS)	2735	12	31
Joint 2nd place in the FIDE World Championship 2005	Alexander Morozevich (RUS)	2758	5	30
Qualified via the Candidates Tournament	Péter Lékó (HUN)	2751	7	28
Qualified via the Candidates Tournament	Boris Gelfand (ISR)	2733	13	39
Qualified via the Candidates Tournament	Levon Aronian (ARM)	2750	8	24
Qualified via the Candidates Tournament	Alexander Grischuk (RUS)	2726	14	23

== Qualification process ==
The top four finishers of the 2005 FIDE World Championship event were granted direct entry into the 2007 event. However, Veselin Topalov, FIDE World Chess Champion 2005, was replaced by Vladimir Kramnik, Classical World Chess Champion, after losing his unification match to him in the 2006 World Championship.

Four further players qualified through the 2005–07 qualification process, which consisted of three stages:

1. Continental championships
2. 2005 World Cup
3. 2007 Candidates Tournament

=== 2005 World Cup ===
The 2005 World Cup, held in Khanty-Mansiysk, Russia, was the main qualification path for the Candidates tournament (providing 10 out of 16 candidates). It was a knock-out tournament of mini-matches, in the style of the FIDE World Chess Championships 1998-2004. However, once 16 players were left, they were no longer immediately eliminated, but played further mini-matches to establish places 1 through 16.

The top finishers were:

1. Levon Aronian (Armenia)
2. Ruslan Ponomariov (Ukraine)
3. Étienne Bacrot (France)
4. Alexander Grischuk (Russia)
5. Evgeny Bareev (Russia)
6. Boris Gelfand (Israel)
7. Sergei Rublevsky (Russia)
8. Mikhail Gurevich (Turkey)

9. Gata Kamsky (USA)
10. Magnus Carlsen (Norway)
11. Vladimir Malakhov (Russia)
12. Francisco Vallejo Pons (Spain)
13. Alexey Dreev (Russia)
14. Loek van Wely (Netherlands)
15. Joël Lautier (France)
16. Konstantin Sakaev (Russia)

The top 10 qualified for the Candidates Tournament. Since Bacrot was already qualified on rating, 11th placed Malakhov also qualified.

=== 2007 Candidates tournament ===
One place in the Candidates Tournament was reserved for 2004 FIDE World Champion Kasimdzhanov, who had also finished 6th in the 2005 championship tournament. Five places were then awarded to the five highest rated players (average of July 2004 and January 2005 ratings): Leko, Adams, Polgar, Shirov and Bacrot. The remaining ten places went to the highest finishers at the 2005 World Cup who had not otherwise qualified (see above).

The Candidates tournament, held in Elista, Kalmykia, Russia, from 26 May to 14 June 2007, was originally to consist of a two-round knockout with one player qualifying from each quarter of the draw. In September 2006, FIDE proposed that these players play a 16 player, single round-robin tournament instead. However this decision was reversed, and the tournament consisted of two rounds of matches as originally planned.

World Cup winner Aronian was top seed, with the remaining players seeded in rating order according to the January 2006 ratings list. In the second round, the 1v16 winner played the 8v9 winner, 2v15 winner versus 7v10 winner, and so on.

==== Match conditions ====
Matches were best of six games, at normal time controls (40/120, then 20/60, then 15 minutes + 30 seconds per move). Where matches were tied after six games, tie breaks were played on the seventh day:

1. Best of four rapid games were played. Rapid time control was 25 minutes for the game, plus 10 seconds per move.
2. Where the score was still tied, best of two blitz games were played. Blitz time control was 5 minutes for the game, plus 10 seconds per move.
3. If the score was still tied, the players would have drawn lots for a single sudden death game where White had six minutes but needed to win, Black had five minutes but only needed to draw. This final stage of tie break, called an Armageddon chess game, was never required.

==== Bracket ====
Round 1
1	Levon Aronian (ARM)	1	½	0	1	0	½	4	7
16	Magnus Carlsen (NOR)	0	½	1	0	1	½	2	5
8	Alexei Shirov (ESP)	½	½	½	0	½	1	2½	5½
9	Michael Adams (ENG)	½	½	½	1	½	0	½	3½
2	Peter Leko (HUN)	½	1	1	1	3½
15	Mikhail Gurevich (TUR)	½	0	0	0	½
7	Judit Polgár (HUN)	½	0	½	0	1	½	2½
10	Evgeny Bareev (RUS)	½	1	½	1	0	½	3½
3	Ruslan Ponomariov (UKR)	½	½	0	½	½	½	2½
14	Sergei Rublevsky (RUS)	½	½	1	½	½	½	3½
6	Alexander Grischuk (RUS)	1	½	½	1	½	3½
11	Vladimir Malakhov (RUS)	0	½	½	0	½	1½
4	Boris Gelfand (ISR)	½	½	½	½	½	½	2½	5½
13	Rustam Kasimdzhanov (UZB)	½	½	½	½	½	½	½	3½
5	Étienne Bacrot (FRA)	½	0	0	0	½
12	Gata Kamsky (USA)	½	1	1	1	3½

Round 2
1	Levon Aronian (ARM)	1	½	½	½	½	½	3½
8	Alexei Shirov (ESP)	0	½	½	½	½	½	2½
2	Peter Leko (HUN)	1	½	1	½	½	3½
10	Evgeny Bareev (RUS)	0	½	0	½	½	1½
14	Sergei Rublevsky (RUS)	0	½	½	1	½	½	½	3½
6	Alexander Grischuk (RUS)	1	½	½	0	½	½	2½	5½
4	Boris Gelfand (ISR)	½	½	1	½	1	3½
12	Gata Kamsky (USA)	½	½	0	½	0	1½

The four second round winners qualified for the championship tournament.

== 2007 Championship tournament ==
=== Playing conditions ===
The tournament was a double round robin, with the first round on 13 September 2007 and the final round on 29 September 2007. Rest days were on the 17th, 22nd and 26th, that is after rounds 4, 8 and 11. Games each day began at 2 pm local time, which is 19:00 UTC. The time control was 40/2h, 20/1h, 15m+30sec/all meaning that each player had 2 hours per game, plus an extra hour added after the 40th move, 15 extra minutes added after the 60th move, and from there on 30 extra seconds added for each move (Fischer delay). The pairings were made on Wednesday, 12 September 2007.

=== Results ===
Round 1–13 September
Anand	Gelfand	½–½	C42 Petrov
Kramnik	Svidler	½–½	D43 Slav
Morozevich	Aronian	½–½	E12 Queen's Indian
Grischuk	Lékó	½–½	C88 Ruy Lopez
Round 2–14 September
Kramnik (½)	Morozevich (½)	1–0	E04 Catalan
Gelfand (½)	Grischuk (½)	½–½	E15 Queen's Indian
Svidler (½)	Lékó (½)	½–½	C89 Ruy Lopez
Aronian (½)	Anand (½)	0–1	D43 QGD
Round 3–15 September
Anand (1½)	Kramnik (1½)	½–½	C42 Petrov
Grischuk (1)	Aronian (½)	½–½	C88 Ruy Lopez
Lékó (1)	Gelfand (1)	½–½	C42 Petrov
Morozevich (½)	Svidler (1)	1–0	C45 Scotch
Round 4–16 September
Aronian (1)	Lékó (1½)	1–0	A33 Benoni
Kramnik (2)	Grischuk (1½)	½–½	E06 Catalan
Morozevich (1½)	Anand (2)	½–½	D47 QGD
Svidler (1)	Gelfand (1½)	½–½	C42 Petrov
Round 5–18 September
Anand (2½)	Svidler (1½)	1–0	C89 Ruy Lopez
Gelfand (2)	Aronian (2)	1–0	A60 Benoni
Grischuk (2)	Morozevich (2)	1–0	D38 QGD
Lékó (1½)	Kramnik (2½)	½–½	C54 Bishop's
Round 6–19 September
Aronian (2)	Kramnik (3)	½–½	E06 Catalan
Gelfand (3)	Morozevich (2)	1–0	E17 Queen's Indian
Grischuk (3)	Svidler (1½)	½–½	D43 Semi-Slav
Lékó (2)	Anand (3½)	½–½	C78 Ruy Lopez
Round 7–20 September
Anand (4)	Grischuk (3½)	1–0	C88 Ruy Lopez
Kramnik (3½)	Gelfand (4)	½–½	D43 Slav
Morozevich (2)	Lékó (2½)	½–½	C45 Scotch
Svidler (2)	Aronian (2½)	½–½	C69 Ruy Lopez

Round 8–21 September
Aronian (3)	Morozevich (2½)	½–½	E17 Queen's Indian
Gelfand (4½)	Anand (5)	½–½	E06 Catalan
Lékó (3)	Grischuk (3½)	1–0	C88 Ruy Lopez
Svidler (2½)	Kramnik (4)	½–½	C42 Petrov
Round 9–23 September
Anand (5½)	Aronian (3½)	½–½	C89 Ruy Lopez
Grischuk (3½)	Gelfand (5)	1–0	E20 Nimzo-Indian
Lékó (4)	Svidler (3)	½–½	B90 Najdorf Sicilian
Morozevich (3)	Kramnik (4½)	1–0	E61 King's Indian
Round 10–24 September
Aronian (4)	Grischuk (4½)	1–0	D30 QGD
Gelfand (5)	Lékó (4½)	½–½	E05 Catalan
Kramnik (4½)	Anand (6)	½–½	D43 Semi-Slav
Svidler (3½)	Morozevich (4)	½–½	B17 Caro–Kann
Round 11–25 September
Anand (6½)	Morozevich (4½)	1–0	B90 Najdorf Sicilian
Gelfand (5½)	Svidler (4)	½–½	A15 English
Grischuk (4½)	Kramnik (5)	½–½	C43 Petrov
Lékó (5)	Aronian (5)	½–½	E15 Queen's Indian
Round 12–27 September
Aronian (5½)	Gelfand (6)	0–1	D43 Semi-Slav
Kramnik (5½)	Lékó (5½)	1–0	E05 Catalan
Morozevich (4½)	Grischuk (5)	1–0	A28 English
Svidler (4½)	Anand (7½)	½–½	C88 Ruy Lopez
Round 13–28 September
Aronian (5½)	Svidler (5)	½–½	A29 English
Gelfand (7)	Kramnik (6½)	½–½	D47 Semi-Slav
Grischuk (5)	Anand (8)	½–½	D43 Semi-Slav
Lékó (5½)	Morozevich (5½)	1–0	B66 Sicilian
Round 14–29 September
Anand (8½)	Lékó (6½)	½–½	C89 Ruy Lopez
Kramnik (7)	Aronian (6)	1–0	E15 Queen's Indian
Morozevich (5½)	Gelfand (7½)	½–½	C42 Petrov
Svidler (5½)	Grischuk (5½)	1–0	B90 Najdorf Sicilian

Numbers in parentheses indicate players' scores prior to the round.

=== Final standings ===
Rank	Player	Rating	ANA		KRA		GEL		LEK		SVI		MOR		ARO		GRI		Points	H2H	Wins	NS
1	Viswanathan Anand (IND)	2792			½	½	½	½	½	½	1	½	1	½	½	1	1	½	9			
2	Vladimir Kramnik (RUS)	2769	½	½			½	½	1	½	½	½	1	0	1	½	½	½	8	1	3	54.50
3	Boris Gelfand (ISR)	2733	½	½	½	½			½	½	½	½	1	½	1	1	½	0	8	1	3	54.25
4	Peter Leko (HUN)	2751	½	½	½	0	½	½			½	½	1	½	½	0	1	½	7			
5	Peter Svidler (RUS)	2735	½	0	½	½	½	½	½	½			½	0	½	½	1	½	6½			
6	Alexander Morozevich (RUS)	2758	½	0	1	0	½	0	½	0	1	½			½	½	1	0	6	1	3	
7	Levon Aronian (ARM)	2750	0	½	½	0	0	0	1	½	½	½	½	½			1	½	6	1	2	
8	Alexander Grischuk (RUS)	2726	½	0	½	½	1	½	½	0	½	0	1	0	½	0			5½			

Key: H2H = head-to-head, points against tied player; NS = Neustadtl score

For players who finished level on points, the following tie-breakers were applied (in order of precedence): results of games between tied players, total number of wins, Neustadtl score.

=== Points by round ===
This table shows the total number of wins minus the total number of losses each player had after each round. The symbol '=' indicates the player had won and lost the same number of games after that round. Green backgrounds indicate the player(s) with the highest score after each round. Red backgrounds indicate players who could no longer win the tournament after each round.

#	Player	Round													
#	Player	1	2	3	4	5	6	7	8	9	10	11	12	13	14
1	Viswanathan Anand (IND)	=	+1	+1	+1	+2	+2	+3	+3	+3	+3	+4	+4	+4	+4
2	Vladimir Kramnik (RUS)	=	+1	+1	+1	+1	+1	+1	+1	=	=	=	+1	+1	+2
3	Boris Gelfand (ISR)	=	=	=	=	+1	+2	+2	+2	+1	+1	+1	+2	+2	+2
4	Peter Leko (HUN)	=	=	=	−1	−1	−1	−1	=	=	=	=	−1	=	=
5	Peter Svidler (RUS)	=	=	−1	−1	−2	−2	−2	−2	−2	−2	−2	−2	−2	−1
6	Alexander Morozevich (RUS)	=	−1	=	=	−1	−2	−2	−2	−1	−1	−2	−1	−2	−2
7	Levon Aronian (ARM)	=	−1	−1	=	−1	−1	−1	−1	−1	=	=	−1	−1	−2
8	Alexander Grischuk (RUS)	=	=	=	=	+1	+1	=	−1	=	−1	−1	−2	−2	−3
