= Alexander Stripunsky =

American chess grandmaster (born 1970)

Personal information
- Born: August 18, 1970 (age 56) Ukrainian SSR, Soviet Union

Chess career
- Country: Soviet Union → Ukraine (before 1997); United States (after 1997)
- Title: Grandmaster (1998)
- FIDE rating: 2476 (October 2026)
- Peak rating: 2597 (October 2006)

Alexander Stripunsky (Ukrainian: Олександр Стріпунський) (Ukraine, born August 18, 1970) is an American chess grandmaster. He has been a grandmaster (GM) since 1998.

== Career ==
- In July 2002 Stripunsky participated in the World Open tournament. He became 15th with 6 points.
- In December 2004 he shared first place at the US Championship. He scored 7 points out of 9 rounds, together with Hikaru Nakamura. At December 6 the play-offs were won by Hikaru Nakamura, Stripunsky therefore became runner-up.
- July 10, 2005 the long distance match between New York City and Saint Petersburg took place, which was won by the Russians, 2 - 6. Stripunsky played against Nikita Vitiugov.
- In 2008 he won in Sturbridge, Massachusetts, with 5 points out of 6 rounds the 38th Continental Open.
- In 2014 Stripunski won the Fairfield County Masters & Class Championships, which were held in Fairfield County, Connecticut; the average rating of the players in the top section was 2430. He won the tournament by in the last round defeating his main competitor IM Jan Van de Mortel in 33 moves.
- In 2015 he reached shared third place at the annual New Jersey Open tournament, scoring 4.5 points in 6 games. The tournament was won by GM Magesh Panchanathan.
