= Sergei Rublevsky =

Russian chess grandmaster (born 1974)

Sergei Vladimirovich Rublevsky
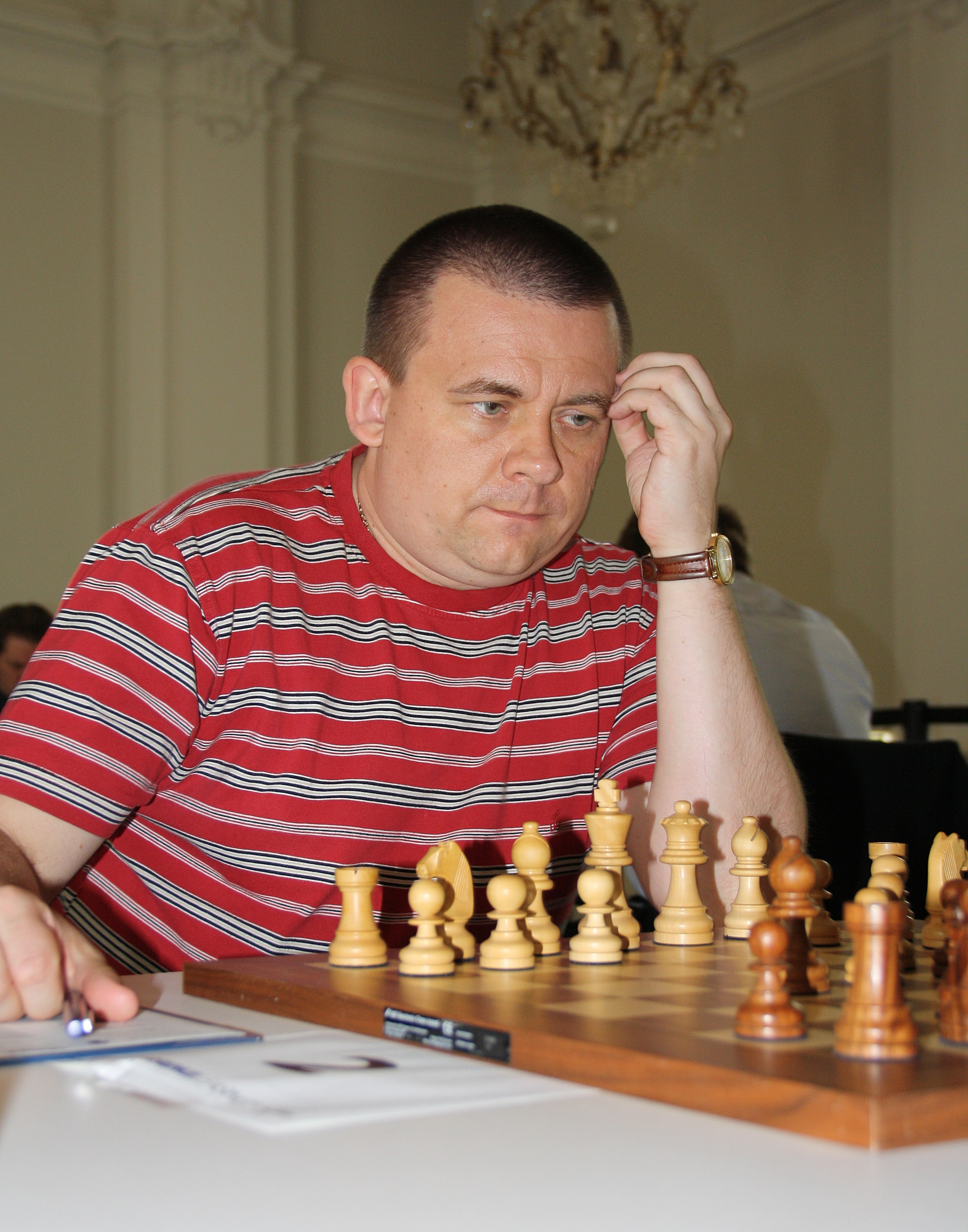

Personal information
- Born: Сергей Владимирович Рублевский; October 15, 1974 (age 51) Kurgan, Kurgan Oblast, Russian SFSR, Soviet Union

Chess career
- Country: Soviet Union (until 1991); Russia (since 1992)
- Title: Grandmaster (1994)
- FIDE rating: 2637 (July 2026)
- Peak rating: 2706 (November 2013)
- Peak ranking: No. 12 (July 1998)
Medal record
Several others (see below)

Sergei Vladimirovich Rublevsky (Russian: Сергей Владимирович Рублевский; born 15 October 1974) is a Russian chess grandmaster (1994).

== Biography ==
Sergei Rublevsky was born on October 15, 1974 in Kurgan, Kurgan Oblast, Russian Soviet Federative Socialist Republic, Union of Soviet Socialist Republics.

He has won four team gold medals and one individual bronze medal at Chess Olympiads. He won the prestigious Aeroflot Open in 2004, and became the 58th Russian chess champion after winning the Russian Superfinal in Moscow (18–30 December 2005), one point clear from Dmitry Jakovenko and Alexander Morozevich.

He finished in the top 10 in the 2005 FIDE World Cup, which qualified him for the Candidates Tournament for the FIDE World Chess Championship 2007, played in May–June 2007. He defeated Ruslan Ponomariov 3½-2½ in the first round. In the second round he played Alexander Grischuk. The match was tied 3-3, but Grischuk won the rapid playoff 2½-½, eliminating Rublevsky from the championship. In recent years, Rublevsky has mostly switched from playing to coaching and has been working with a number of top players both senior and junior.

== Style ==
GM Nigel Short said of Rublevsky, "Rublevsky is not a sexy player. There are younger and more gifted individuals around and he knows it. Yet he has canniness, which the greenhorns don't. He does not engage the teenagers on the sharp end of opening theory, testing his ailing memory against the freshness of their computer-assisted analysis. Instead he heads a little off the beaten track - not exactly to the jungle, but to lesser-travelled byways where his experience counts."

GM Alexander Morozevich has said, "... my opening repertoire is not any ‘weirder’ than, say, that of Rublevsky."

With White, Rublevsky plays 1.e4 the overwhelming percentage of the time.

Against 1...e5, Rublevsky plays the Scotch. Against 1...c5, Rublevsky sometimes goes for Open Sicilians, but he has a couple of non-Open pet lines: 1.e4 c5 2.Nf3 d6 3.Bb5+ and 1.e4 c5 2.Nf3 e6 3.c4. Against the French and Caro–Kann, he plays 2.d4 followed by 3.Nd2.

With Black, he meets 1.e4 with Kan/Paulsen/Taimanov Sicilians; against 1.d4 he generally plays the Queen's Gambit Accepted and the occasional Slav.

== Honours and awards ==
- Order of Friendship (April 11, 2024)
- Honorary citizen of the Kurgan Oblast (February 5, 2019)

== Notable games ==
- Sergei Rublevsky vs Garry Kasparov, 20th European Club Cup 2004, Sicilian Defense: Nyezhmetdinov-Rossolimo Attack (B30), 1-0
- Sergei Rublevsky vs Alexey Dreev, Russian Championship Superfinal 2005, Sicilian Defense: Nyezhmetdinov-Rossolimo Attack (B30), 1-0
- Sergei Rublevsky vs Pentala Harikrishna, Aerosvit GM Tournament 2006, Sicilian Defense: Canal Attack (B51), 1-0
- Sergei Rublevsky vs Ruslan Ponomariov, Candidates Match: Ponomariov-Rublevsky 2007, Caro–Kann Defense: Bronstein-Larsen Variation (B16), 1/2-1/2

Preceded by Garry Kasparov	Russian Chess Champion; 2005	Succeeded by Evgeny Alekseev
