= Ruslan Ponomariov =

Ukrainian chess grandmaster (born 1983)

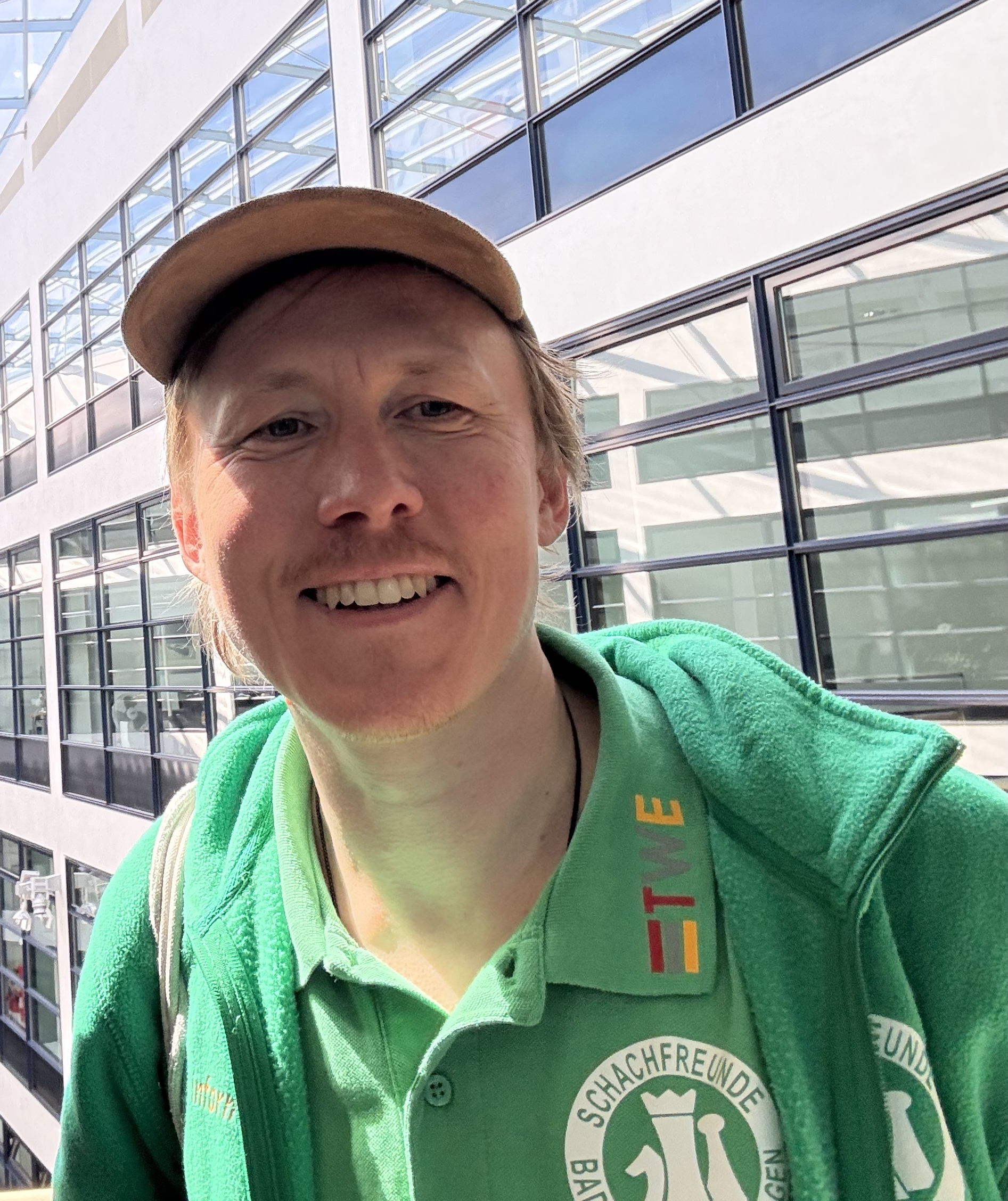
- Ponomariov in 2026

Personal information
- Born: Ruslan Olehovych Ponomariov; 11 October 1983 (age 42) Horlivka, Ukrainian SSR, Soviet Union

Chess career
- Country: Ukraine
- Title: Grandmaster (1998)
- World Champion: 2002–2004 (FIDE)
- FIDE rating: 2632 (October 2026)
- Peak rating: 2764 (July 2011)
- Ranking: No. 90 (October 2026)
- Peak ranking: No. 6 (April 2002)

Ruslan Olehovych Ponomariov (Ukrainian: Русла́н Оле́гович Пономарьо́в; born 11 October 1983) is a Ukrainian chess grandmaster. He was FIDE World Chess Champion from 2002 to 2004 and is the youngest holder of the title at the age of 18 years and 104 days, though the title was split at the time. He won the Ukrainian Chess Championship in 2011.

He was runner-up in the Chess World Cup 2005 and Chess World Cup 2009, and reached the semi-finals in 2011 and the quarterfinals in 2007.

== Early career ==
Ponomariov was born in Horlivka in Ukraine. He was taught to play chess by his father at the age of 5. At 9 he became a first category player, and in September 1993 he moved to Kramatorsk. Here Ponomariov attended the A. V. Momot Chess School and was trained by Boris Ponomariov. In 1994 he placed third in the World Under-12 Championship at the age of ten. In 1996 he won the European Under 18 Championship at the age of just twelve, and the following year won the World Under-18 Championship. In 1998, at the age of fourteen, he was awarded the Grandmaster title, making him the youngest ever player at that time to hold the title. In 1999, he was a member of the Ukrainian national youth team, which won the U-16 Chess Olympiad in Artek, Ukraine.

Among Ponomariov's notable later results are first place at the Donetsk Zonal tournament in 1998, 5/7 score in the European Club Cup 2000 (including a victory over then-FIDE World Champion Alexander Khalifman), joint first with 7½/9 at Torshavn 2000, 8½/11 for Ukraine in the 2001 Chess Olympiad in Istanbul, winning gold medal on board 2, and first place with 7/10 in the 2001 Governor's Cup in Kramatorsk.

== FIDE World Chess Champion 2002 ==
In 2002 he beat his fellow countryman Vasyl Ivanchuk in the final of the FIDE World Chess Championship 2002 by a score of 4½-2½ to become FIDE World Champion at the age of 18. He is the youngest ever holder of the title, though because he won it in a knockout-style tournament during the period where there was a title split in the chess world, he was not an undisputed holder of the title.

In the same year he finished second in the very strong Linares tournament, behind Garry Kasparov. His result in the strong 2003 Corus tournament at Wijk aan Zee was not as good – despite having the third highest Elo rating, he finished only joint eleventh out of fourteen players with 6/13, and at Linares the same year he finished only fifth out of seven with 5½/12.

There were plans for him to play a fourteen-game match against Kasparov in Yalta in September 2003, the winner of which would go on to play the winner of a match between Vladimir Kramnik and Péter Lékó as part of the "Prague Agreement" to reunify the World Chess Championship (from 1993 until 2006 there were two world chess championships). However, this was called off by FIDE on the grounds that Ponomariov failed to sign the contract in time. Ponomariov has since alleged lack of equality in the contract for both contenders.

Ponomariov remained FIDE World Champion until Rustam Kasimdzhanov won the FIDE World Chess Championship 2004.

== Post-championship career ==
On Ponomariov's 20th birthday, October 11, 2003, he became the first high-profile player to forfeit a game because of his mobile phone ringing during play. This happened in round one of the European Team Chess Championship in Plovdiv, Bulgaria, when Ponomariov was playing Black against Swedish GM Evgenij Agrest.

In 2004, Ponomariov won the gold medal at the 2004 Chess Olympiad held in Calvià, Spain, with the Ukrainian team.

In 2005, he won the 15th edition of the Ciudad de Pamplona tournament. He also won a rapid tournament in Odesa, Ukraine, and the Golden Blitz Cup in Moscow. Finally, that year he reached the 2005 Chess World Cup final against Levon Aronian, who won the final. Ponomariov defeated Fritz under tournament conditions, at the 2nd Festival Internacional de Ajedrez Man-Machine in Bilbao, Spain. This is the last time that a human player has defeated a top computer at even odds under tournament conditions.

In 2006, he shared first place with Aronian and Peter Leko in the Tal Memorial tournament in Moscow.

His second-place finish in the Chess World Cup 2005 qualified him for the 2007 Candidates tournament. Ponomariov lost in the first round, in a six-game match against Sergei Rublevsky, and thus did not qualify for the 2007 World Championship tournament. As of 2023, he has not qualified for a Candidates tournament since.

In 2009, he shared first place with Hikaru Nakamura at the Donostia Chess Festival in San Sebastian, Spain. The latter won the tie-break blitz games 2–0. Ponomariov got one more second place by tie-break that year in the 2009 Chess World Cup, where he reached the final against Israeli Boris Gelfand. After four classical games, four rapid games, and two blitz games with a drawn score, Gelfand finally won in one last set of two blitz games.

In July 2010, Ponomariov won the prestigious Dortmund Sparkassen Chess Meeting in Dortmund, one point ahead of Lê Quang Liêm from Vietnam. In September of that year, Ukraine won the gold once more at the 2010 Chess Olympiad in Khanty-Mansiysk with players Vasyl Ivanchuk, Ruslan Ponomariov, Pavel Eljanov, Zahar Efimenko, and Alexander Moiseenko.

In February 2011, after occupying last place at the World Blitz Championship in November 2010 in Moscow, Ponomariov showed great improvement at the strong Aeroflot Blitz held in the same city by reaching second place, just half a point behind Shakhriyar Mamedyarov.

In June 2011, he won the 80th Ukrainian Chess Championship, the strongest ever in the country, with 8½/11 and a performance rating of 2853.

== Personal life ==
Ponomariov is married to Ines, a Spanish interpreter. The two have known each other since 2008. They live in Bilbao with their son, Yaroslav.

== Awards and honors ==
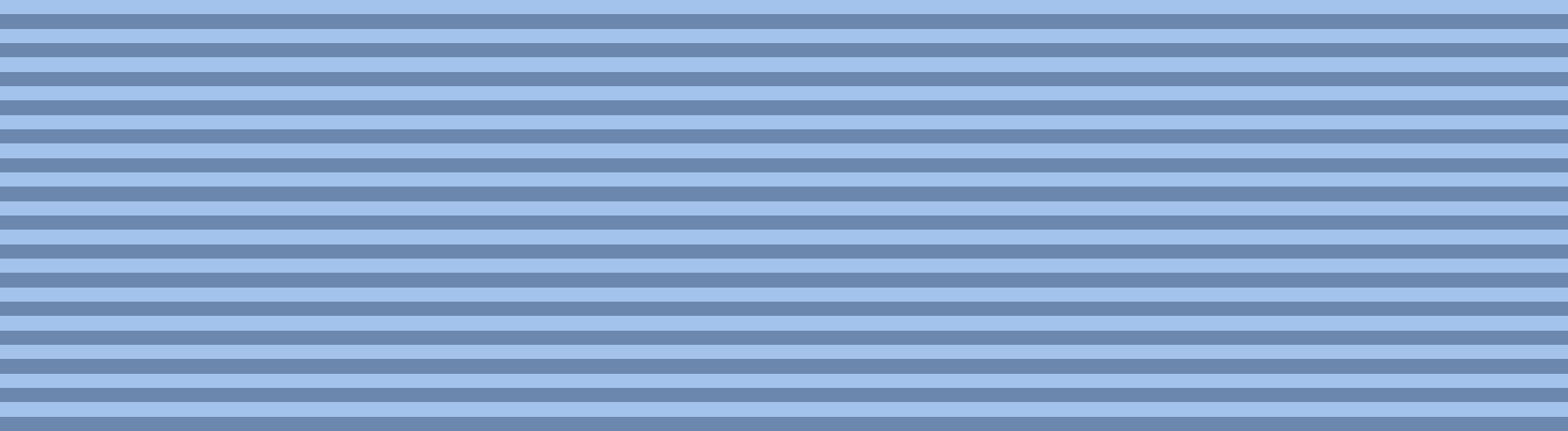
- Order of Prince Yaroslav the Wise (5th class)
- Order of Merit (3rd class)
- Honorary Diploma of the Cabinet of Ministers of Ukraine

Awards and achievements
Preceded by Viswanathan Anand	FIDE World Chess Champion; 2002–04	Succeeded by Rustam Kasimdzhanov
Preceded by Étienne Bacrot	Youngest chess grandmaster ever 1997–99	Succeeded by Bu Xiangzhi
