= Robert Markuš =

Serbian chess grandmaster (born 1983)

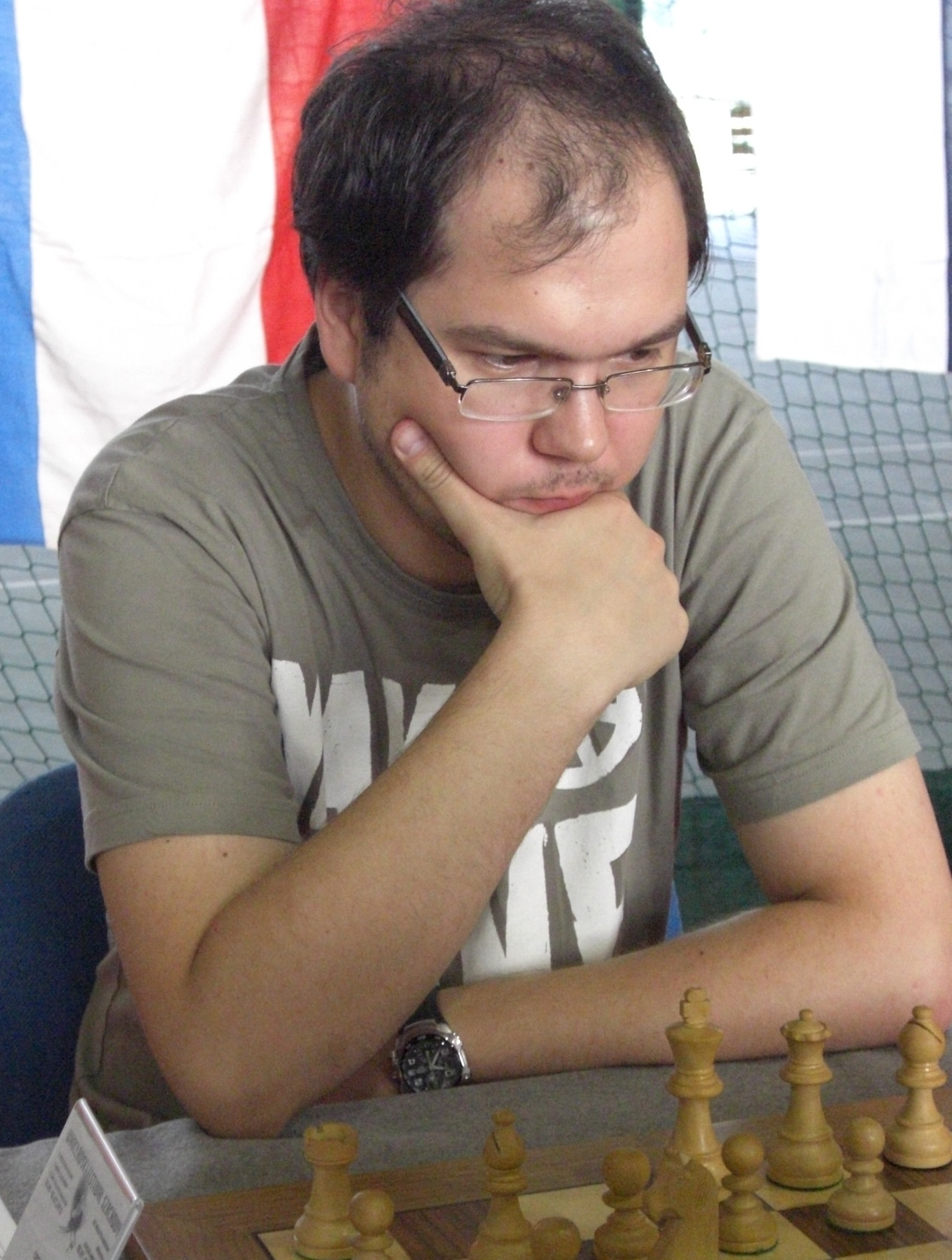

Personal information
- Born: October 7, 1983 (age 42) Bačka Topola, Yugoslavia
- Spouse: Ana Srebrnič

Chess career
- Country: Yugoslavia → Serbia and Montenegro → Serbia
- Title: Grandmaster (2004)
- FIDE rating: 2521 (July 2026)
- Peak rating: 2673 (May 2017)
- Peak ranking: No. 73 (April 2017)

Robert Markuš (Serbian Cyrillic: Роберт Маркуш, Hungarian: Róbert Márkus; born October 7, 1983) is a Serbian chess Grandmaster.

He is a member of Novi Sad Chess Club. Markuš played for the Serbian Olympic team in 37th Chess Olympiad.
