= Brandon Jacobson =

American chess grandmaster (born 2003)

Personal information
- Born: November 14, 2003 (age 22) Plainfield, New Jersey, U.S.

Chess career
- Country: United States
- Title: Grandmaster (2020)
- FIDE rating: 2627 (October 2026)
- Peak rating: 2644 (September 2026)
- Ranking: No. 99 (October 2026)
- Peak ranking: No. 73 (September 2026)

Twitch information
- Channel: GMBrandonJacobson
- Years active: 2020–present
- Followers: 5867
- Last updated: September 17, 2026

Brandon Jacobson (born November 14, 2003) is an American chess player who received the FIDE title of Grandmaster in 2020 at the age of 16. He previously held the International Master (2018) and FIDE Master (2017) titles. He is ranked the 36th best player in the United States. His highest rating was 2583 (in November 2024). Brandon's older brother Aaron Jacobson holds the title of International Master.

== Chess career ==
In January 2020, Jacobson won the 2020 Charlotte Open in Charlotte, North Carolina, with a score of 7.0/9, half a point ahead of GM Cemil Can Ali Marandi, GM Akshat Chandra, GM Andrew Tang, GM Ulvi Bajarani, and IM Aaron Grabinsky. He earned his final GM norm and a $3000 prize.

Later in 2020, Jacobson participated in the 2020 US Junior Chess Championship. He ended the tournament with a 5.5 score and 4th in rankings.

In May 2024, Jacobson gained notoriety by playing a dubious opening (1.a4 and 2.Ra3 as White and 1...a5 and 2...Ra6 as Black) during a match against Daniel Naroditsky, defeating him (+37, -26, =6). Jacobson's chess.com account (named "Viih_Sou") was later banned for cheating, though former World Champion Magnus Carlsen would later use the opening in all blitz games of the subsequent Early Titled Tuesday.

Jacobson vs. Nakamura, World Rapid Chess Championship 2024

Position: b8 black rook, b7 white pawn, d7 black bishop, e7 black king, h7 black pawn, a6 white pawn, d6 black pawn, g6 black pawn, c5 white rook, d5 white pawn, e5 black pawn, f4 black pawn, d3 white bishop, f3 white pawn, g2 white pawn, h2 white pawn, f1 white king

Final position

In December 2024, Jacobson again used the dubious opening 1.a4 (though without playing 2.Ra3), this time against Hikaru Nakamura in the World Rapid Chess Championship 2024, winning the game in 47 moves.
