= Christopher Yoo (chess player) =

American chess grandmaster (born 2006)

Christopher Woojin Yoo
Personal information
- Born: December 19, 2006 (age 19) Fremont, California, U.S.

Chess career
- Country: United States
- Title: Grandmaster (2022)
- FIDE rating: 2605 (August 2026)
- Peak rating: 2616 (August 2024)

Christopher Woojin Yoo (born December 19, 2006) is an American chess grandmaster. He became the youngest International Master in American history in February 2019, until being surpassed by Abhimanyu Mishra later in 2019.

== Career ==
In April 2018, Yoo earned clear first place in the Charlotte Chess Center's Spring 2018 IM Norm Invitational held in Charlotte, North Carolina with a score of 6.0/9.

In September 2020, Yoo won the 2020 US Cadet (U16) Championship, held online.

In May 2021, Yoo tied for first place with GM Peter Prohaszka in the Memorial Day 2021 CCCSA GM Norm Invitational tournament with a performance rating of 2600, earning his first GM norm.

In September 2021, Yoo won the Labor Day 2021 CCCSA GM Norm Invitational tournament with a performance rating of 2620, earning his second GM norm.

In November 2021, Yoo tied for 3rd place at the U.S. Masters with a performance rating of 2604, earning his third GM norm.

On December 12, 2021, Yoo achieved a live FIDE rating of 2500.2 after round 5 of the Marshall Chess Club Championship, fulfilling the final requirement for the Grandmaster title.

In December 2021, Yoo tied for 1st place at the 2021 Charlotte Open alongside GMs Titas Stremavičius, Cemil Can Ali Marandi, Tanguy Ringoir, Robby Kevlishvili, and Akshat Chandra with a performance rating of 2603, earning a fourth GM norm.

In July 2022, Yoo won the US Junior Chess Championship with 7/9, a point ahead of the field.

In October 2022, Yoo defeated GM Wesley So with the black pieces in the second round of the US Chess Championship in an over 200 point upset.

In November 2022, Yoo tied for 1st place at the 2022 U.S. Masters with a performance rating of 2653, and claimed the championship title after winning a blitz playoff against GM Alejandro Ramirez by a score of 2-0.

== Disqualification and suspensions ==
In October 2024, Yoo was disqualified from the 2024 U.S. Championship due to code of conduct violations. After losing to Fabiano Caruana in round five, he punched a female videographer from behind while leaving. Prior to being disqualified, he had a score of 1.5/5. His tournament results were annulled. He was banned from the hosting venue, the St. Louis Chess Club, and was charged with fourth-degree assault and taken into custody. His membership was also suspended by US Chess for one year, with an additional five years of probation until November 14, 2030. Yoo later publicly apologized for the incident and said he lost his temper after the loss.

In May 2025, Yoo was suspended by FIDE for 60 days pending an investigation into new allegations of harassment. The complainant later came forward and publicly alleged that Yoo had harassed her multiple times at the 2024 Grenke Chess Festival and followed her to her hotel room, where he attempted to gain entry by claiming to be from room service.

In August 2025, Yoo was found guilty by FIDE of multiple violations, including harassment, psychological abuse, and inappropriate conduct toward a female player. He was handed an 18-month suspension from FIDE-rated events, of which twelve months of the ban are suspended, and six months to be served immediately. Any further breach during that time would trigger the full ban.
