= Akshat Chandra =

American chess grandmaster (born 1999)

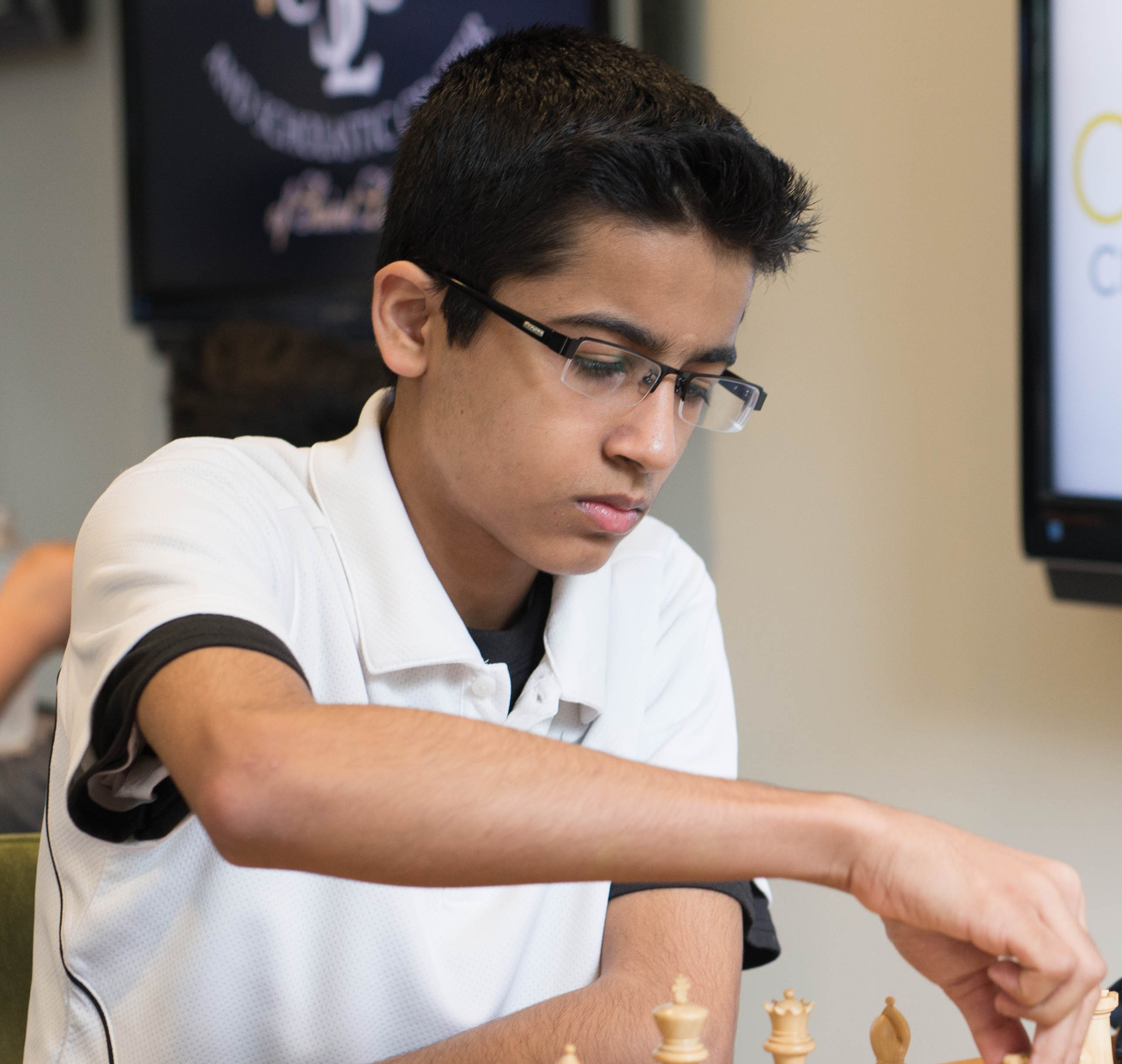
- Chandra in 2015

Personal information
- Born: May 28, 1999 (age 27) Livingston, New Jersey, U.S.

Chess career
- Country: United States
- Title: Grandmaster (2017)
- FIDE rating: 2463 (November 2026)
- Peak rating: 2536 (February 2020)

Akshat Chandra (born May 28, 1999) is an American chess player. He started playing Chess during a visit to India in 2009 when he was nine years old. In 2015, he won the US National K-12 Championship and was also the US Junior Champion, the first time both titles were held by the same person in a single year. He earned the FIDE title of Grandmaster (GM) in March 2017.

== Chess career ==
After learning chess from local part-time coaches, he began working with his first professional coach, the Serbian GM Predrag Trajkovic, in 2010, who worked with him for about 4 1/2 years until early 2014. Trajkovic exposed him to Soviet style chess, with a focus on positional understanding.

In January 2010, he received his starting FIDE rating of 1548. In May 2015 he crossed the 2500 Grandmaster (GM) rating level in realtime rating, the fastest rating improvement in the world of this magnitude recorded in such a short time. This was achieved prior to FIDE's change of K-factor multiple effective July 2014 for players aged 18 and less, which inflated point gains. He represented India until 2012 before switching to the United States.

In April 2013, he won the K-9 Super-National championship. He was consistently ranked as the number one player in the US in his age category since 2013. At the age of 14, Chandra won the gold at the North American Youth Championship, U-18 section, in Toronto, Canada.

Since April 2014, Chandra has remained the highest USCF rated Junior Rapid Chess player (U21) in the country.

In April 2015, Chandra won the highest Scholastic Chess title in the US–the National K-12 Championship. In July 2015, he became the US Junior Champion (Closed). This was the first time in US Chess that both the top Scholastic and the Junior titles were held by the same individual in a single year. In addition, Chandra was the 2015 National High School Blitz Chess Champion as well.

In the 2016 Saint Louis Autumn Invitational, Chandra achieved the six-day norm and completed his grandmaster title requirements. He was awarded the Grandmaster title in March 2017.

In 2018, he won the University of Texas at Dallas (UTD) FIDE Open tournament. In 2019, he won the 13th annual SPICE Cup Open. He is the only player to have finished sole first in the top two US collegiate open tournaments - the UTD FIDE and the Spice Cup.

In January 2020, he tied for second place with a score of 6.5/9 in the Charlotte Open, held in Charlotte, North Carolina, tying with GM Cemil Can Ali Marandi, GM Andrew Tang, GM Ulvi Bajarani, and IM Aaron Grabinsky.

In December 2021, Chandra tied for 1st place at the 2021 Charlotte Open alongside Grandmasters Titas Stremavičius, Cemil Can Ali Marandi, Tanguy Ringoir, Robby Kevlishvili, and then-IM Christopher Yoo.

== Personal life ==
Besides growing up in the US, Chandra lived in India for a few years, and in Europe in 2012. When his family had relocated to India, Akshat was drawn to Chess. He is also a writer, and documented his journey from a beginner to Grandmaster level on his blog Quest to GM, which was then converted to a personal website. He was the youngest regular writer for Chessbase, and contributed articles to the USCF official website.

He received the 2016 U.S. Chess Trust Scholar-Player award, sponsored by the U.S. Chess Trust and the National Scholastic Chess Foundation.
