= FIDE World Rapid Chess Championship 2003 =

FIDE World Rapid Championship 2003
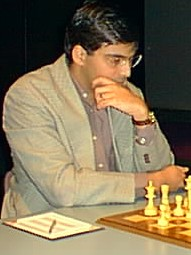
- Viswanathan Anand

Tournament information
- Sport: Chess
- Location: Cap d'Agde, France
- Dates: 24 October 2003–30 October 2003
- Administrator: FIDE
- Format: Rapid
- Tournament format(s): Round-robin, Single-elimination
- Host: CCAS
- Participants: 16

Final positions
- Champion: (India) Viswanathan Anand
- Runner-up: (Russia) Vladimir Kramnik

The FIDE World Rapid Chess Championship 2003 was the third FIDE-sanctioned edition of the World Rapid Chess Championship. The Caisse Centrale d'Activités Sociales des Electriciens et Gaziers de France (CCAS) hosted the 16-player tournament from 24 to 30 October 2003 at Cap d'Agde, France. Featuring eleven of the world's twelve top-ranked players, the multi-stage tournament was the strongest rapid tournament in history up to that point. Indian grandmaster Viswanathan Anand won the event, defeating World Champion Vladimir Kramnik 1½–½ in the finals. This was Anand's seventh World Rapid title.

== Details ==
The FIDE World Rapid Championship 2003 was hosted by Caisse Centrale d'Activités Sociales des Electriciens et Gaziers de France (CCAS) in conjunction with FIDE. The time control was 25 minutes + 10-second increment for rapid games and 3 minutes + 3-second increment for blitz games.

The tournament began with a preliminary group stage (24-26 October), where the sixteen players were split into two groups of eight players each. Each group played a seven-game round robin, with the top four players from each advancing to an eight-player single-elimination knockout (28-30 October) to determine the champion. In case of a tie for 4th place in the group stage, a blitz playoff would be played. Each knockout match was best-of-two games with alternating colors. In case of a 1–1 tie, the players would play a blitz tiebreak, also with alternating colors.

The field featured eleven of the world's top-12-ranked players and had an average Elo rating of 2726, making it the strongest rapid chess tournament in history up to that point. Included in the field were the reigning FIDE and Classical world champions, Ruslan Ponomariov and Vladimir Kramnik. The 16 participants, all of whom are grandmasters, are listed below:

1. Vladimir Kramnik (RUS), 2777
2. Viswanathan Anand (IND), 2766
3. Evgeny Bareev (RUS), 2739
4. Alexei Shirov (ESP), 2737
5. Veselin Topalov (BUL), 2735
6. Alexander Grischuk (RUS), 2732
7. Michael Adams (ENG), 2725
8. Peter Svidler (RUS), 2723
9. Peter Leko (HUN), 2722
10. Judit Polgár (HUN), 2722
11. Ruslan Ponomariov (UKR), 2718
12. Boris Gelfand (ISR), 2703
13. Zurab Azmaiparashvili (GEO), 2693
14. Anatoly Karpov (RUS), 2693
15. Joel Lautier (FRA), 2666
16. Etienne Bacrot (FRA), 2664

== Results ==
=== Group A ===
	Player	Rating	1	2	3	4	5	6	7	8	Total	TPR
1	Vladimir Kramnik (RUS)	2777		½	½	1	1	½	½	½	4½	2813
2	Ruslan Ponomariov (UKR)	2718	½		½	1	½	½	½	1	4½	2821
3	Etienne Bacrot (FRA)	2664	½	½		½	½	½	1	1	4½	2829
4	Boris Gelfand (ISR)	2703	0	0	½		1	1	½	½	3½	2717
5	Veselin Topalov (BUL)	2735	0	½	½	0		1	1	½	3½	2722
6	Zurab Azmaiparashvili (GEO)	2693	½	½	½	0	0		0	1	2½	2614
7	Michael Adams (ENG)	2725	½	½	0	½	0	1		0	2½	2616
8	Evgeny Bareev (CAN)	2739	½	0	0	½	½	0	1		2½	2621

Vladimir Kramnik, Ruslan Ponomariov, and Etienne Bacrot all scored 4½/7 (+2–0=5) to progress from Group A. One point behind were Veselin Topalov and Boris Gelfand, who tied for 4th place with 3½/7 (+2–2=3). Topalov defeated Gelfand in a blitz playoff to claim the final quarterfinals spot.

=== Group A - Blitz Tiebreak ===
Name	Rating	1	2	Total
Veselin Topalov (BUL)	2735	1	½	1½
Boris Gelfand (ISR)	2703	0	½	½

=== Group B ===
	Player	Rating	1	2	3	4	5	6	7	8	Total	TPR
1	Peter Svidler (RUS)	2723		½	½	1	½	1	½	1	5	2877
2	Alexander Grischuk (RUS)	2732	½		½	½	½	1	1	½	4½	2820
3	Viswanathan Anand (IND)	2766	½	½		0	½	1	½	1	4	2763
4	Judit Polgar (HUN)	2722	0	½	1		½	0	1	1	4	2769
5	Alexei Shirov (ESP)	2737	½	½	½	½		0	1	½	3½	2717
6	Peter Leko (HUN)	2722	0	0	0	1	1		1	½	3½	2719
7	Joel Lautier (FRA)	2666	½	0	½	0	0	0		1	2	2569
8	Anatoly Karpov (RUS)	2693	0	½	0	0	½	½	0		1½	2494

In group B, Peter Svidler finished clear of the field with 5/7 (+3–0=4) to secure a spot in the quarterfinals. A half point behind was Alexander Grischuk on 4½/7, and another half point behind on 4/7 were Viswanathan Anand, and Judit Polgar. The four players advanced to the quarterfinals.

=== Knockout ===
Quarterfinals
(Russia) Vladimir Kramnik	1½
(Hungary) Judit Polgár	½
(France) Etienne Bacrot	1
(Russia) Alexander Grischuk	3
(Ukraine) Ruslan Ponomariov	½
(India) Viswanathan Anand	1½
(Russia) Peter Svidler	1½
(Bulgaria) Veselin Topalov	½

Semifinals
(Russia) Vladimir Kramnik	2
(Russia) Alexander Grischuk	0
(India) Viswanathan Anand	2½
(Russia) Peter Svidler	1½

Final
(Russia) Vladimir Kramnik	½
(India) Viswanathan Anand	1½

Kramnik, the reigning classical world champion and tournament's No. 1 seed, dispatched Polgár and Grischuk with little difficulty to reach the final. In the other half of the bracket, Anand joined Kramnik in the finals after defeating Ponomariov and then beating Svidler in a sudden-death blitz game after three drawn games to join him.

After Game 1 of the finals ended in a quiet 19-move draw, Anand chose to play for complications in Game 2 in the white side of a Sveshnikov Sicilian. Following an inaccuracy from Kramnik (17... a5? 18. Na3), Anand was able to use his two knights to infiltrate Kramnik's defense, eventually forcing a queen sac to win the game and the match.

World Rapid Chess Championship 2003 – Final
Name	Rating	1	2	Total
Vladimir Kramnik (RUS)	2777	½	0	½
Viswanathan Anand (IND)	2766	½	1	1½

With this victory, Anand earned his seventh World Rapid title and his second of the year, having earlier won the Grenkeleasing Rapid Championship 2003. After this event, there was a long hiatus before FIDE next organized a World Championship in 2012. In the meantime, the Chess Classic continued to annually organize its rapid world championships until 2010.
