= World Active Chess Championship =

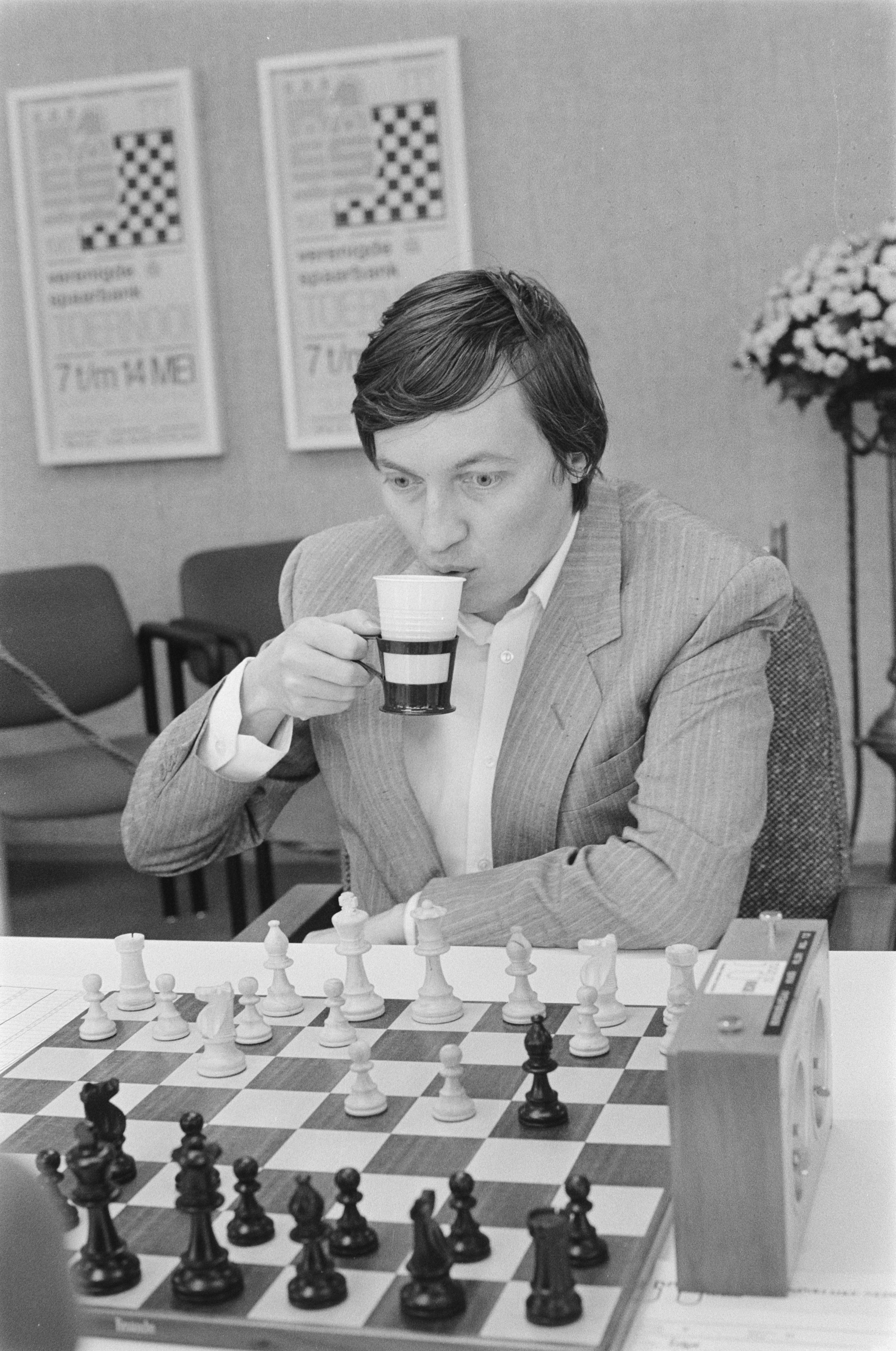
- Anatoly Karpov Anatoly Karpov

Tournament information
- Sport: Chess
- Location: Mazatlan, Mexico
- Dates: 10 December 1988–17 December 1988
- Administrator: FIDE
- Format: Rapid
- Tournament format(s): Swiss-system, Single-elimination
- Venue: El Cid Resort
- Participants: 61
- Purse: 150,000 USD

Final positions
- Champion: (Soviet Union) Anatoly Karpov
- Runner-up: (Soviet Union) Viktor Gavrikov

The World Active Chess Championship was the inaugural edition of the World Rapid Chess Championship. It was the first known elite tournament in rapid chess, which was then known as "active chess". The tournament was held at El Cid Resort in Mazatlan, Mexico from 10 to 17 December 1988 and was a multi-stage tournament that featured 61 players. Former World Champion Anatoly Karpov won the event, edging out GM Viktor Gavrikov on tiebreaks after their finals match ended in a 5–5 tie.

== Details ==
The tournament began with a 13-round preliminary Swiss system stage. The top eight players from the Swiss proceeded to a single-elimination knockout, where players played four-game matches in quarterfinals and semifinals, and an eight-game match in the finals. The time control was 30 minutes per player (no increment) and the total prize fund was 150,000 USD.

61 players competed in the tournament, with notable participants listed below:

1. Anatoly Karpov (URS), 2715
2. Rafael Vaganian (URS), 2625
3. Yasser Seirawan (USA), 2595
4. Jaan Ehlvest (URS), 2585
5. Bent Larsen (DEN), 2570
6. Vladimir Tukmakov (URS), 2570
7. Maxim Dlugy (USA), 2550
8. Viktor Gavrikov (URS), 2545
9. Lev Alburt (USA), 2535
10. Walter Browne (USA), 2530
11. Roman Dzindzichashvili (ISR), 2530
12. Nana Ioseliani (URS), 2455
13. Gábor Kállai (HUN), 2450
14. Sofia Polgar (HUN), 2320

== Results ==
In the finals match between Karpov and Gavrikov, the score was tied 4-4 after the eight rapid games. Two 5-minute blitz games were played as a tiebreaker, both of which were drawn. Thus, Karpov was named the new Active Chess Champion by virtue of his better Buchholz score among the top four tied players (Karpov, Gavrikov, Vaganian and Dlugy). He and Gavrikov were both awarded 40,000 USD.

Quarterfinals
(Soviet Union) Anatoly Karpov	2½
(Israel) Roman Dzindzichashvili	1½
(Soviet Union) Jaan Ehlvest	2½
(United States) Maxim Dlugy	1½
(Soviet Union) Vladimir Tukmakov	2½
(Soviet Union) Rafael Vaganian	½
(Soviet Union) Viktor Gavrikov	2½
(Hungary) Gábor Kállai	1½

Semifinals
(Soviet Union) Anatoly Karpov	2½
(Soviet Union) Jaan Ehlvest	1½
(Soviet Union) Vladimir Tukmakov	½
(Soviet Union) Viktor Gavrikov	2½

Final
(Soviet Union) Anatoly Karpov	5
(Soviet Union) Viktor Gavrikov	5

== Aftermath ==
Garry Kasparov, then the current World Champion, declined to participate in the event and derided the concept of an active chess champion, saying, "Active Chess? What does that make me, the Passive World Champion?" The controversy surrounding the event and the crowning of a separate "active chess champion" led to the parallel rapid championship being dropped for future years. It was not until 2001 that FIDE organized their next edition of the World Rapid Championship, which was branded FIDE World Cup of Rapid Chess.
