= Robby Kevlishvili =

Dutch chess grandmaster (born 2001)

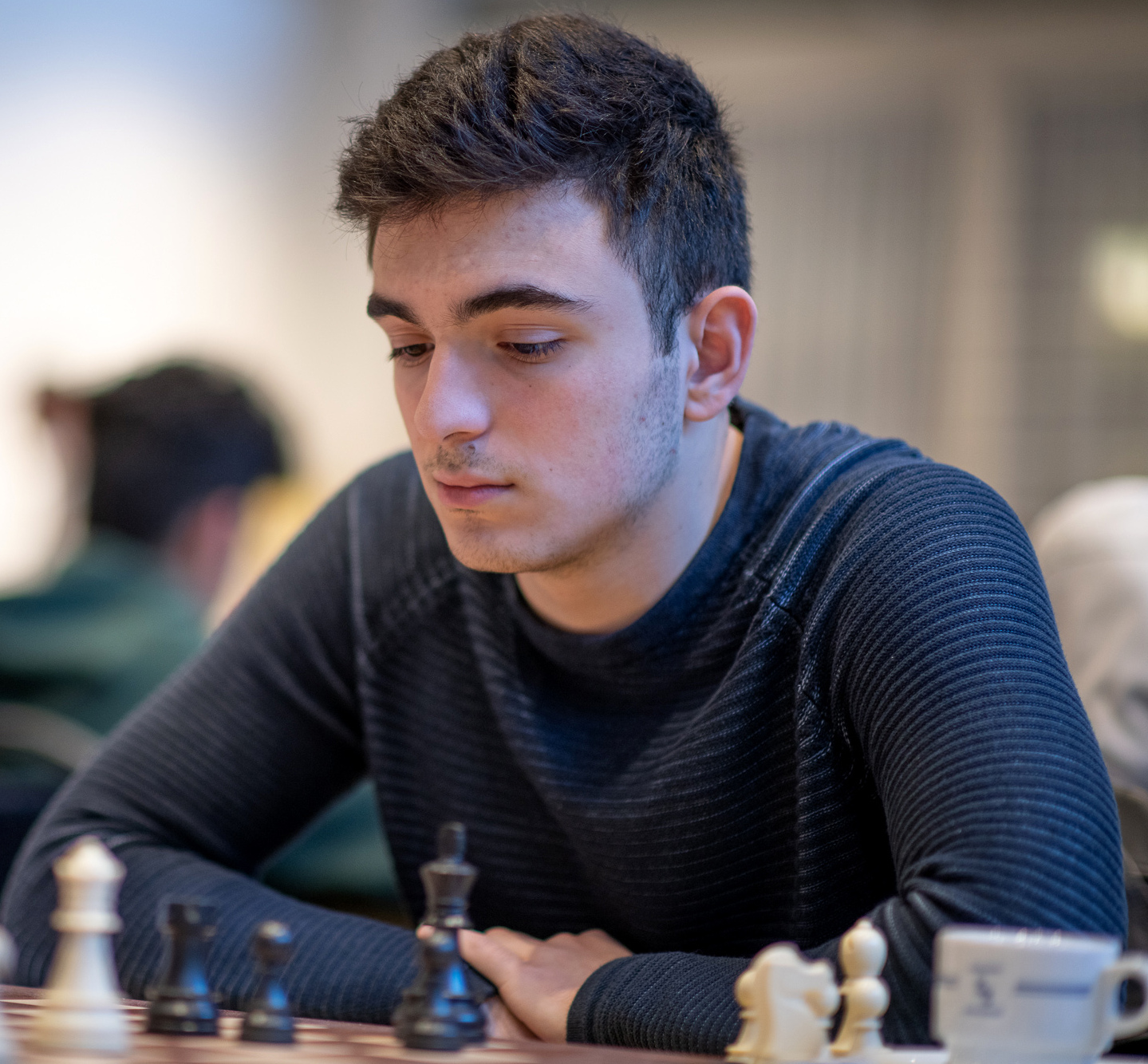
- Kevlishvili in 2018

Personal information
- Born: April 15, 2001 (age 25) Dronten, Netherlands

Chess career
- Country: Netherlands
- Title: Grandmaster (2021)
- FIDE rating: 2516 (November 2026)
- Peak rating: 2560 (January 2025)

Robby Kevlishvili is a Dutch chess grandmaster.

== Chess career ==
Kevlishvili began playing chess at the age of 4, and finished in second place in the 2013 U-12 World Youth Chess Championship.

In December 2021, Kevlishvili tied for 1st place at the 2021 Charlotte Open alongside Grandmasters Titas Stremavičius, Cemil Can Ali Marandi, Christopher Yoo, Tanguy Ringoir, and Akshat Chandra.

In the Trinidad and Tobago International Open 2022, Kevlishvili won the Blitz event with a perfect 9/9 score. In the Masters section, he won with a score of 8/9.

In 2022, Kevlishvili represented the Netherlands at the World Team Championship in Jersusalem, Israel, winning an individual bronze medal. Later in the year, Kevlishvili finished second at the Dutch Chess Championship.

In 2022, Kevlishvili won the 2022 Pan-American Intercollegiate Chess Championship as part of team SLU. Later that year, Saint Louis also won the National Championship. In 2023, Saint Louis University finished second at the National Championships. In 2025, with Kevlishvili as the team captain, Saint Louis finished third at the Pan-American Intercollegiate Championship, qualifying for the 2025 President's Cup.

In 2024, Kevlishvili participated in the 2024 World Rapid & Blitz Championships in New York City.

== Personal life ==
Kevlishvili attended Saint Louis University for a major in finance and mathematics, and later a masters of business administration, and played for the university's team in the Collegiate Chess League in 2022 and 2023. The team won both championships.
