= Andrew Tang =

American chess grandmaster (born 1999)

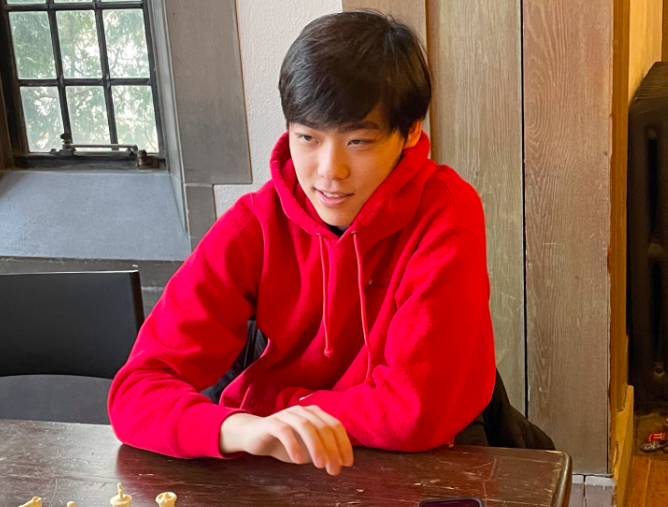
- Tang in 2023
- Born: November 29, 1999 (age 26); Naperville, Illinois, U.S.
- Chess career
- Country: United States
- Title: Grandmaster (2018)
- FIDE rating: 2551 (October 2026)
- Peak rating: 2551 (January 2026)

Twitch information
- Channel: penguingm1
- Years active: 2013–present
- Followers: 60,200

YouTube information
- Channel: penguingm1
- Years active: 2014–present
- Genre: Online chess
- Subscribers: 34,600
- Views: 4 million
- Last updated: October 20, 2026

Andrew Tang (born November 29, 1999) is an American chess grandmaster. He is also a popular streamer, known online for his speed chess skills especially in bullet (one minute), hyperbullet (30 seconds), and ultrabullet (15 seconds) time controls as well as for playing speed chess blindfolded.

== Chess career ==
Tang began playing chess in preschool. He was instructed by John Bartholomew as he was growing up. He earned the title of International Master in 2014 by winning the North American Junior Chess Championship.

Tang earned the title of Grandmaster in November 2017, when he achieved his final norm and an Elo rating over 2500, both required for the title, in the Fall 2017 CCCSA GM Norm Invitational tournament, held in Charlotte, North Carolina. FIDE awarded him the title in April 2018.

In December 2018, he participated in the World Rapid Chess Championship in Saint Petersburg. Initially seeded 190th, Tang achieved a good result, scoring 8.5 points out of 15 rounds, and placing 59th. In the tournament, he also played his first live game against world champion Magnus Carlsen.

In the 2019 U.S. Junior Championship, Tang placed 4th out of 10 with 5/9.

In January 2020, Tang tied for second place with a score of 6.5/9 in the Charlotte Open, held in Charlotte, North Carolina, tying with GM Cemil Can Ali Marandi, GM Akshat Chandra, GM Ulvi Bajarani, and IM Aaron Grabinsky. On October 1, 2020, Tang signed with the esports organization Cloud9 using the online ID penguingm1.

Andrew Tang also competed in the 2021 Bullet Chess Championship Presented By SIG hosted by chess.com. There he competed against GMs Hikaru Nakamura, Nihal Sarin, Daniel Naroditsky and Alireza Firouzja, among others. He finished in 2nd place, losing 5–11 to Firouzja in the final. He again participated in the competition's following-year edition, and again finished in 2nd place, losing 11–8 to Nakamura in the Grand Final.

Andrew Tang won the 2023 US Open. He and GM Alexey Sorokin both won their ninth round games to tie for first place, but Tang won the Armageddon playoff. Tang was subsequently featured on the cover of the December 2023 issue of Chess Life.

In 2024, Tang was inducted into the Minnesota Chess Hall of Fame, by the Minnesota State Chess Association.

In 2024 Tang won the Chess.com Hyperbullet Championship, defeating Daniel Naroditsky in the final. He would defend his title in 2025, again beating Naroditsky in the final.

Tang streams chess live on Twitch, preferring fast bullet chess games of 15-, 30-, or 60-second chess with no increment. He has beaten the Lichess Stockfish engine successively from level 1 through 8 in ultrabullet time control. He has won the Lichess Titled Arena five times as of December 2021.

== Personal life ==
Tang was born in Naperville, Illinois, but his family moved to Minnesota when he was eight. He graduated from Wayzata High School in Plymouth, Minnesota, and attended Princeton University, where he majored in Operations Research and Financial Engineering.

After graduating, he was hired as a quantitative trader by SIG.
