= Tanguy Ringoir =

Belgian chess grandmaster (born 1994)

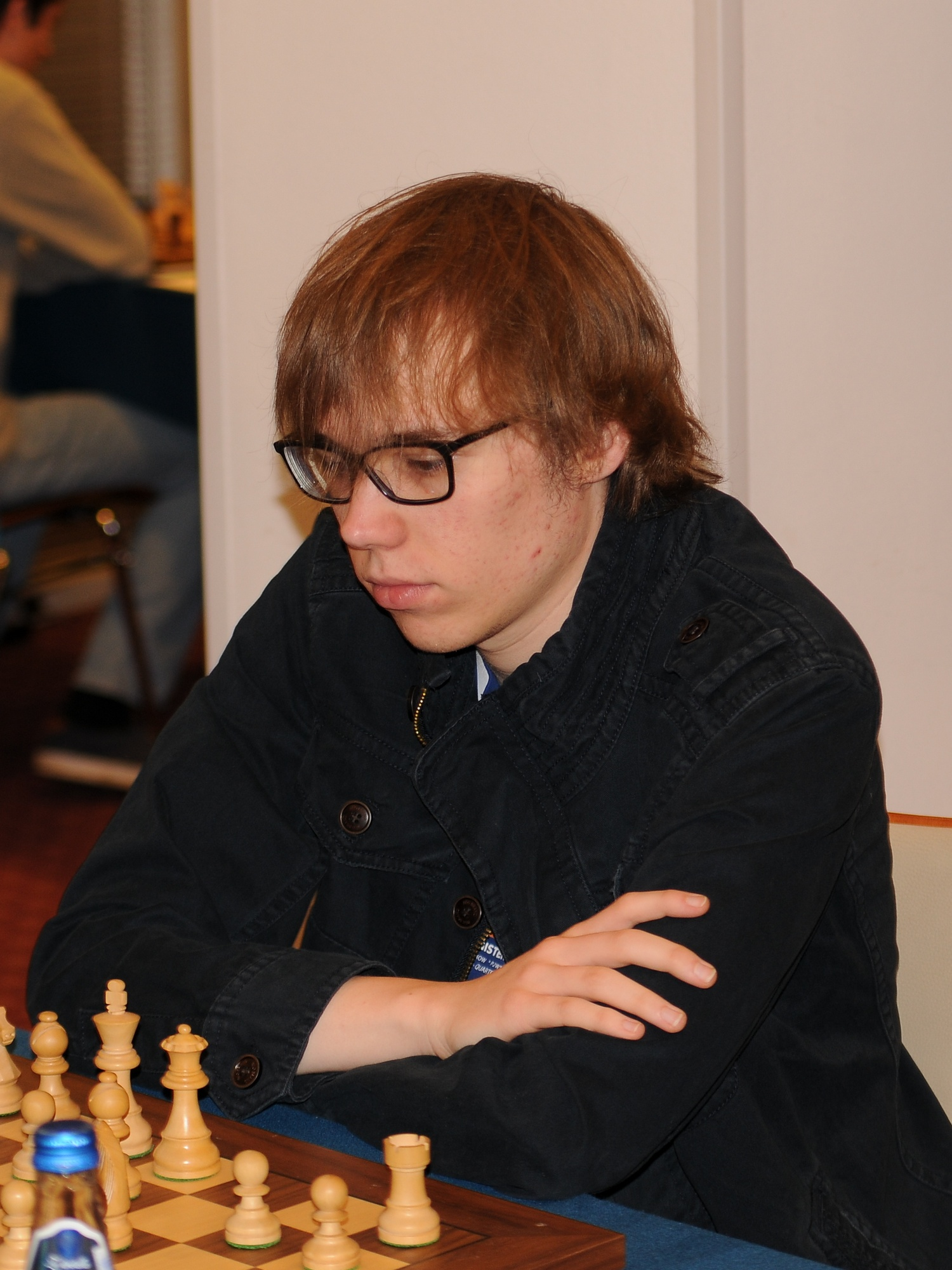
- Ringoir in 2013

Personal information
- Born: June 29, 1994 (age 32) Wetteren, Belgium

Chess career
- Country: Belgium
- Title: Grandmaster (2015)
- FIDE rating: 2529 (July 2026)
- Peak rating: 2543 (May 2018)

Tanguy Ringoir is a Belgian chess grandmaster.

== Chess career ==
In 2012 and 2014, Ringoir played for Belgium in the 40th and 41st Chess Olympiads. He also won the 2012, 2013, and 2016 Belgian Chess Championships and the 2013 Belgian Blitz Championship.

In December 2021, Ringoir tied for 1st place at the 2021 Charlotte Open alongside grandmasters Titas Stremavičius, Cemil Can Ali Marandi, Christopher Yoo, Robby Kevlishvili, and Akshat Chandra.

== Personal life ==
He studied economics at the University of Maryland, Baltimore County, and served as the captain of the chess team, which won six national collegiate championships.
