= Volodar Murzin =

Russian chess grandmaster (born 2006)

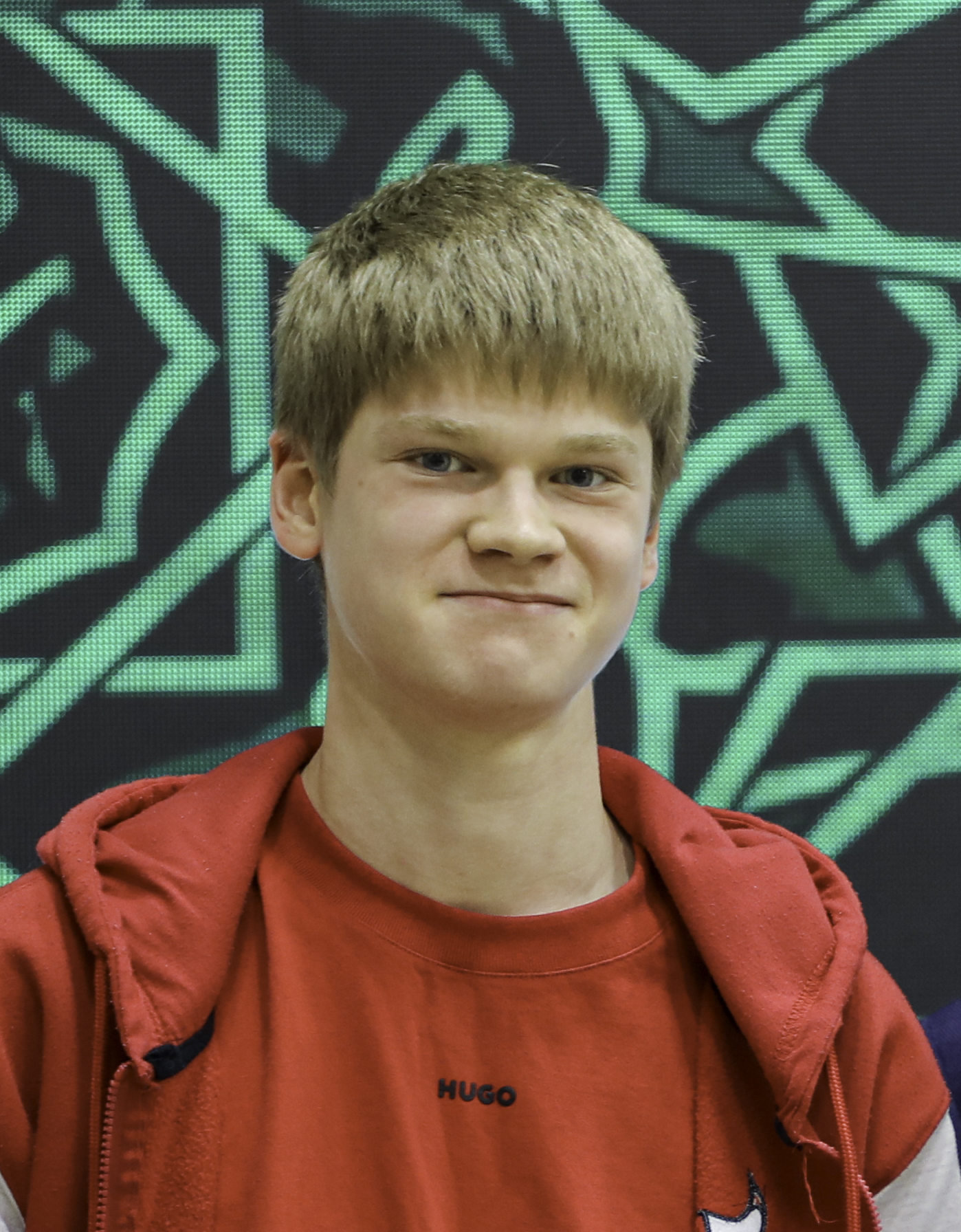
- Murzin in 2026

Personal information
- Born: Volodar Arturovich Murzin; 18 July 2006 (age 19) Nizhny Tagil, Russia

Chess career
- Country: Russia (until 2022); FIDE (since 2022)
- Title: Grandmaster (2022)
- FIDE rating: 2650 (July 2026)
- Peak rating: 2678 (August 2025)
- Ranking: No. 70 (July 2026)
- Peak ranking: No. 46 (August 2025)

Volodar Arturovich Murzin (Russian: Володар Артурович Мурзин; born 18 July 2006) is a Russian chess grandmaster and former World Rapid Chess Champion.

Originally from Nizhny Tagil, Murzin lives in Khimki.

Murzin won the 2024 World Rapid Chess Championship in Wall Street, New York, with a score of 10/13.

== Career ==
=== 2010s ===
In 2017, Murzin achieved his first master title becoming a Fide Master at the age of 11.

Murzin won the U12 title at the European Youth Chess Championship 2018, with a draw against Jakub Chyzy in the final round.

In 2019, Murzin achieved his second title and became an International Master in chess. He achieved this in only 2 years after becoming a Fide Master.

=== 2020s ===
On December 8, 2020, Murzin won the 2020 Russian Championship (Juniors). This was his first National Championship title.

In the Chess World Cup 2021, where he was seeded 151st, he reached the second round shortly before his 15th birthday, losing to 23rd-seeded Vladislav Artemiev by one point in a tiebreaker. He later competed in the 2021 Julius Baer Challengers Chess Tour, placing 4th.

In 2022, Murzin achieved the title of Grandmaster, 3 years after becoming an International Master and 5 years after becoming a Fide Master.

He participated in the Russian Championship Superfinals 2022. Even though he was the lowest rated player in the event, with a rating of 2541, he finished 5th in the event.

==== 2023 ====
On April 19, 2023, Murzin joined the 2023 Russian Championship (Juniors). On April 27, 2023, the event ended and Murzin came out at first place alongside Arseniy Nesterov finishing with a final score of 6.5/9 after 4 wins, 5 draws and 0 losses. This event was Murzin's second National Championship title.

On May 25, 2023, Murzin finished 2023 Sharjah Masters at a tie for 35th place with 14 other players. His final score was a 4.5/9 with 1 win, 7 draws and 1 loss.

On July 5, 2023, Murzin won the 2023 Russian Higher League in a tie with Evgeniy Najer, Pavel Ponkratov, Ivan Rozum, Klementy Sychev and Artyom Timofeev with a final score of 6/9 with 3 wins, 6 draws and 0 losses.

On December 22, 2023, Murzin finished in 2nd place (in a tie with Chithambaram VR. Aravindh, Ernesto J. Fernandez Guillen and Brandon Jacobson) at 2023 Sunway Sitges. His final score was 8/10 with 6 wins, 4 draws and 0 losses. He was 0.5 points away from Abhimanyu Puranik who won the event with a score of 8.5/10.

==== 2024 ====
On May 24, 2024, Murzin returned to play the 2024 Sharjah Master and won the event with a final score of 6.5/9 with 4 wins, 5 draws and 0 lossess. He ended up tied for first place with Bardiya Daneshvar, Sam Shankland and Shamsiddin Vokhidov. The result was a big improvement from his previous placement and his last major win before a world title.

On December 28, Murzin won the 2024 World Rapid Chess Championship after a draw against Karen H. Grigoryan in the final round and a win in the penultimate round against R Praggnanandhaa, featuring an incredible king march. He finished the tournament with a score of 10/13 with 7 wins, 6 draws and 0 losses, including notable wins against top-seeded players Fabiano Caruana, Hikaru Nakamura, Jan-Krzysztof Duda and Praggnanandhaa Rameshbabu. At 18 years old, he is the second-youngest rapid world champion in history, after GM Nodirbek Abdusattorov who was 17 during his victory in 2021.

Murzin finished 8th in the Swiss-system tournament of World Blitz Chess Championship 2024, qualifying for the knockout stage, in which he lost to Ian Nepomniachtchi in the quarterfinals.
