= Cemil Can Ali Marandi =

Turkish chess grandmaster (born 1998)

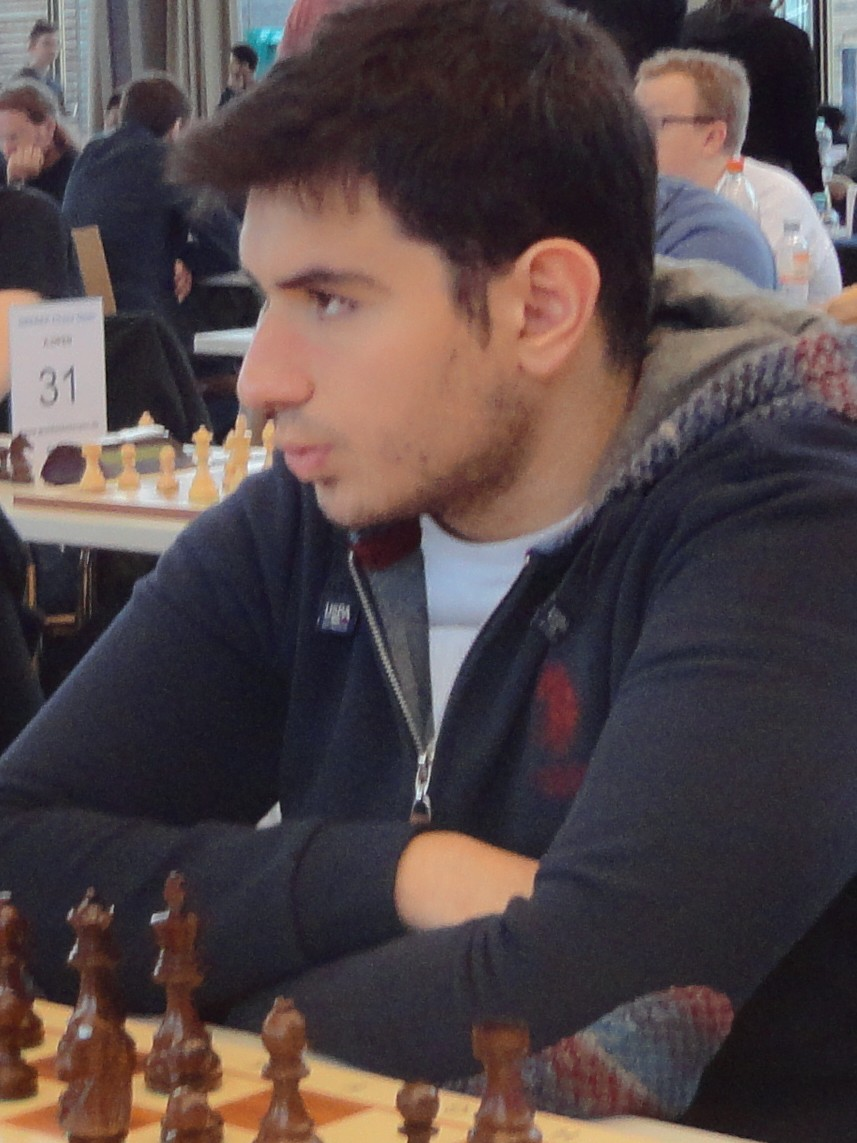
- Cemil Can Ali Marandi in 2016

Personal information
- Born: 17 January 1998 (age 28)

Chess career
- Country: Turkey
- Title: Grandmaster (2017)
- FIDE rating: 2514 (July 2026)
- Peak rating: 2568 (September 2022)

Cemil Can Ali Marandi (born 17 January 1998) is a Turkish chess player who received the FIDE title of Grandmaster in 2017.

== Biography ==
Cemil Can Ali Marandi repeatedly participated in European Youth Chess Championships and World Youth Chess Championships, where he set a peculiar record, winning five times European Youth Chess Championships in five different age groups:

- In 2008, in U10 age group,
- In 2010, in U12 age group,
- In 2011, in U14 age group,
- In 2014, in U16 age group,
- In 2015, in U18 age group.

Cemil Can Ali Marandi participated in the World Youth U16 Chess Olympiads four times (2009–2010, 2013–2014), where he won bronze medal in team scoring (2014). Also he participated in the European Boys' U18 Team Chess Championship four times (2011, 2014–2016), where he won gold (2014) and silver (2011) medals in team scoring, as well as gold (2014) medal in individual scoring.

Cemil Can Ali Marandi played for Turkey 2 in the Chess Olympiad:

- In 2012, at second board in the 40th Chess Olympiad in Istanbul (+2, =5, -2).

Cemil Can Ali Marandi played for Turkey in the European Team Chess Championship:

- In 2011, at third board in the 18th European Team Chess Championship in Porto Carras (+1, =3, -2).

In 2019, Cemil Can Ali Marandi won the US Thanksgiving Open tied with Illia Nyzhnyk and Peter Prohaszka.

In 2013, he was awarded the FIDE title of International Master (IM) and received the Grandmaster (GM) title four years later.

In January 2020, Ali Marandi tied for second place with a score of 6.5/9 in the Charlotte Open, held in Charlotte, North Carolina, tying with GM Akshat Chandra, GM Andrew Tang, GM Ulvi Bajarani, and IM Aaron Grabinsky.

In December 2021, Ali Marandi tied for 1st place at the 2021 Charlotte Open alongside Grandmasters Titas Stremavičius, Tanguy Ringoir, Robby Kevlishvili, Akshat Chandra, and then-IM Christopher Yoo.

In June 2022, he won the Teplice Open with a score of 7.5/9, held in Teplice.
