= World Blitz Chess Championship 2024 =

Global chess tournament

- New York City, United States
- 30–31 December 2024
	World Blitz Champion (shared)	World Blitz Champion (shared)
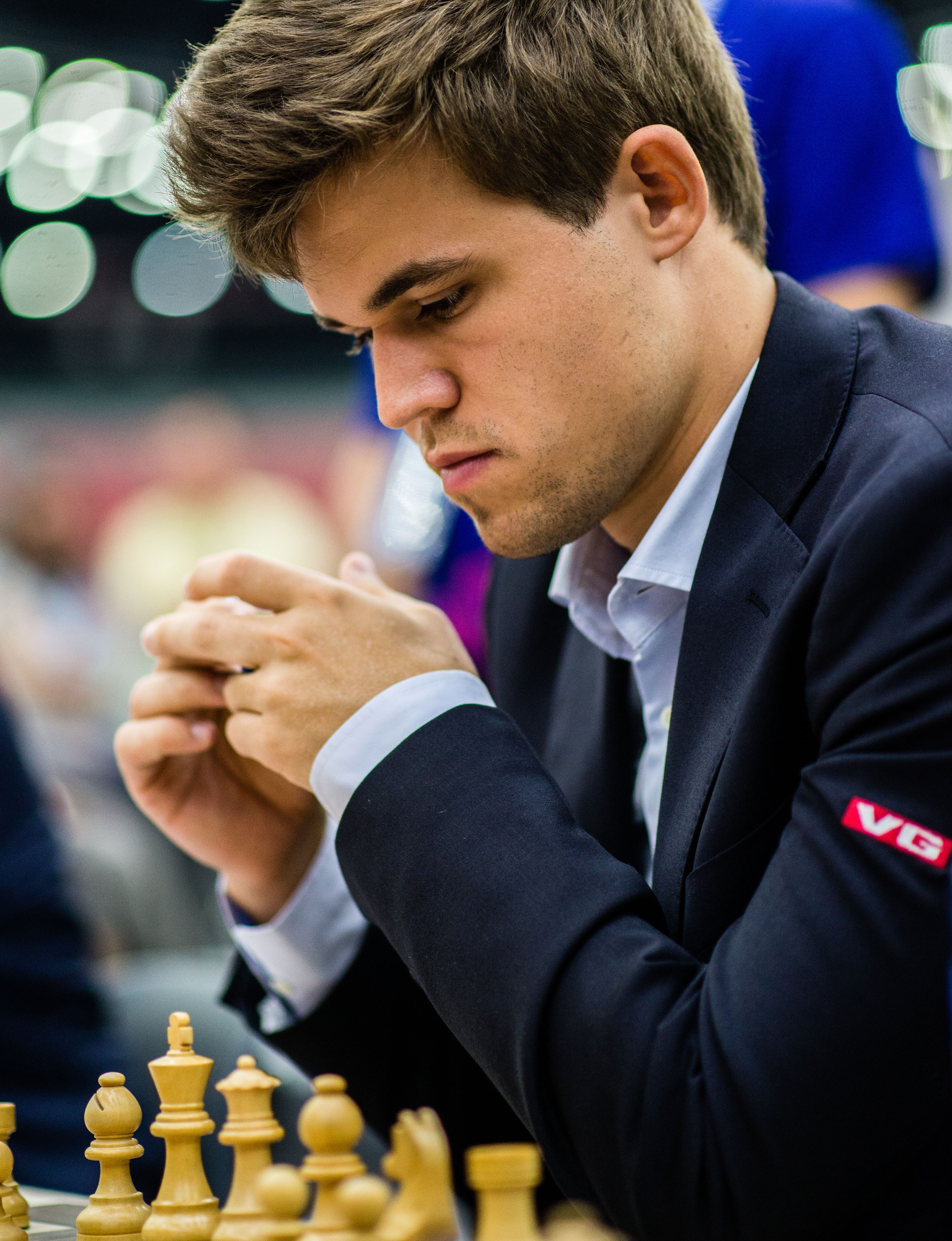
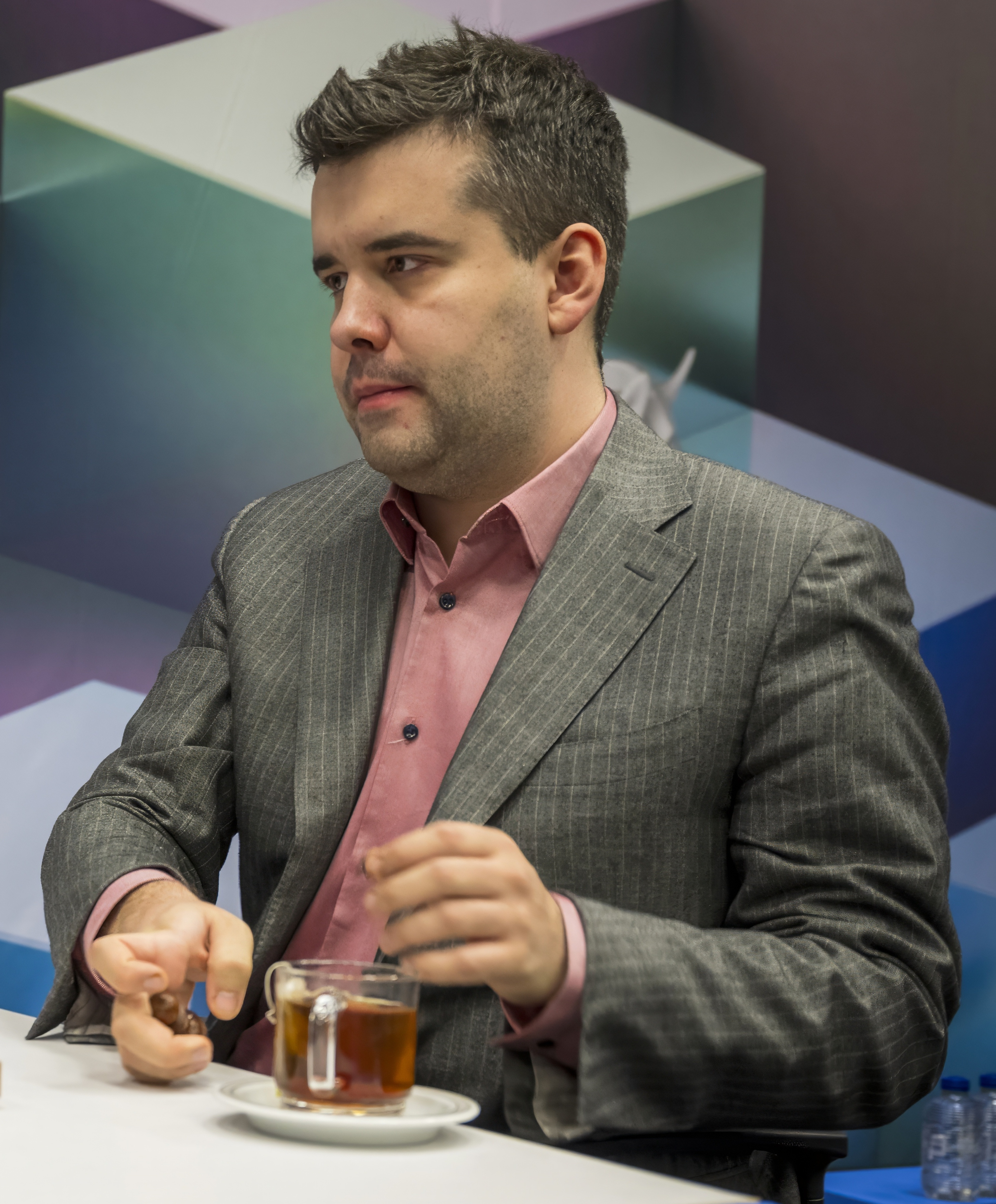
	(Norway) Magnus Carlsen	(FIDE) Ian Nepomniachtchi

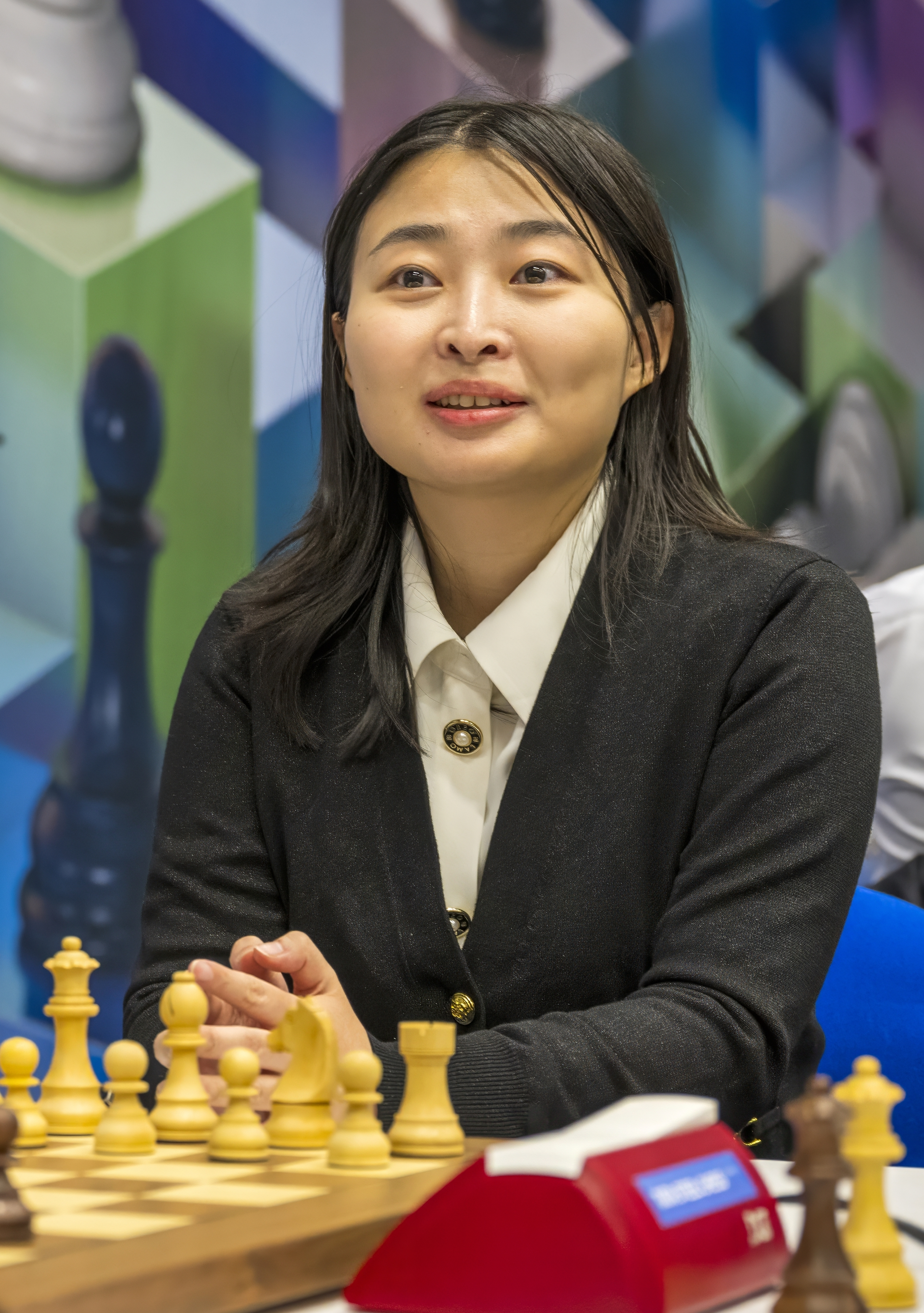
Women's World Blitz Champion, Ju Wenjun

The 2024 World Blitz Chess Championship was an annual chess tournament held by FIDE to determine the world champion in chess played under blitz time controls. Since 2012, FIDE has held the World Rapid and Blitz Championships at a joint tournament. The tournament was held in New York City, United States, from 30 to 31 December 2024.

After three drawn tiebreak games in the finals of the Open section, Magnus Carlsen proposed and Ian Nepomniachtchi agreed to share first place. FIDE controversially allowed the agreement and changed the rules of the tournament to permit them to do so. After two drawn tiebreak games, the Women's section was won by Ju Wenjun.

== Details ==
The tournament was open for players with a rating of 2550 and above, as well as reigning national champions. The total prize fund was $450,000.

The tournament followed a Swiss system consisting of 13 rounds for the Open section and 11 rounds for the Women's section. The top 8 players from the Swiss system proceeded to the knockout rounds, where players played four-game matches in quarter finals, semi-finals, and finals. The time control is blitz, with each player given 3 minutes plus 2 additional seconds per move, starting from the first move. Since 2012, FIDE has held the World Rapid and Blitz Championships as a joint tournament.

== Controversies ==
On 27 December, defending champion Magnus Carlsen declared that he would not participate due to previously having been fined and penalized for violating the dress code by wearing jeans during the World Rapid Chess Championship 2024. However, on 29 December, Carlsen reversed his decision and announced that he would indeed take part in the tournament, after FIDE relaxed its dress code rules and allowed him to continue wearing jeans, which he did.

Daniil Dubov was late to his round 10 match against Hans Niemann. He stated that he had overslept, although later comments made by Dubov in an interview led to speculation that he had intentionally forfeited. As a result of Dubov missing the game, Niemann was awarded a win and Dubov a forfeit loss. This would prove to be relevant as Dubov would finish the Day 1 Swiss-system tournament in a ten-way tie for first place, with only the top eight players advancing to the Day 2 Knockout stage according to the tournament's tiebreak criteria. Of consequence, the first tiebreak criterion (Buchholz cut 1) treats forfeit losses different from played losses. As a result, Dubov finished in 10th place by tiebreaks and was eliminated from the tournament.

Magnus Carlsen and Ian Nepomniachtchi finished the final round of the Open section tied 2-2, which began a tiebreak phase: first player to win a game would win the tournament. After three tiebreak games ended in draws, Carlsen proposed to Nepomniachtchi that they share the championship, and asked an arbiter if such a thing would be possible. Even though FIDE's tournament rules called for another tiebreak game in this situation, FIDE president Arkady Dvorkovich used his authority to agree to the proposal, and both players were declared winners of the Open section. At the press conference, Carlsen justified his decision by saying the players were "tired and nervous" after many hours of blitz and that "it would've been very cruel on both of us if one gets first and the other one gets second."

Carlsen and FIDE's decision to crown co-champions was met with significant criticism from the chess community. Niemann, who Carlsen had defeated in the quarterfinals, tweeted, "The chess world is officially a joke. [...] I can't believe that the official body of chess is being controlled by a singular player for the second time this week!" GM Hikaru Nakamura said on his YouTube channel that he "cannot stand what Magnus has done. I do not think there is any precedent for this [...]". GM Daniel Naroditsky, who missed the knockout stage on tiebreak, tweeted "If only I had known that the rules were flexible, I'd have lobbied for all 10 players who tied for first to be included in the knockout."

GM Cristian Chirila said on the C-Squared podcast that this undermined the world championship title: "This is a huge asterisk [...] this is not a world championship title they have right now. I mean, this is BS." GM Maxime Vachier-Lagrave said that "aborting the match deprived the spectators of a fitting ending, and deprived chess of a legendary sports story, including heartbreak, drama and two athletes who gave it their all." These criticisms were echoed by grandmasters Jacob Aagaard, Ivan Sokolov, Benjamin Bok, Pavel Eljanov, and Elisabeth Pähtz, and IM Gulrukhbegim Tokhirjonova among others.

Later, a video surfaced showing that the players discussed making short draws ad infinitum if the proposal to declare co-champions was declined. This was seen by many, including FIDE President Emil Sutovsky as match fixing, for which Nepomniatchi and Dubov had been double-forfeited in the World Blitz Championship 2023. Carlsen denied these allegations, writing that he was joking in the clip and that it was "not an attempt to influence FIDE."

In response, FIDE updated the regulations of the World Blitz Championship 2025 to decide the winner by an armageddon game if the score is tied after four blitz games in the final.

== Results ==
=== Day 1 - Swiss-system tournament ===
In the Open tournament, a total of ten players accumulated 9.5 points each. After tie-break rules were applied, the top eight advanced to the knockout rounds, which were held on 31 December.

Rank	SNo	Player	Points	TB1
1	9	(FIDE) Ian Nepomniachtchi	9.5	102.5
2	5	(United States) Fabiano Caruana	9.5	101
3	1	(Norway) Magnus Carlsen	9.5	101
4	4	(United States) Wesley So	9.5	100.5
5	2	(France) Alireza Firouzja	9.5	100.5
6	18	(United States) Hans Niemann	9.5	99
7	7	(Poland) Jan-Krzysztof Duda	9.5	97.5
8	41	(FIDE) Volodar Murzin	9.5	95.5
9	17	(United States) Daniel Naroditsky	9.5	92
10	6	(FIDE) Daniil Dubov	9.5	91.5

In the women's section, the top ten players were as follows. After tie-break rules were applied, the top eight advanced to the knockout rounds, which were held on 31 December.

Rank	SNo	Player	Points	TB1
1	21	(India) Vaishali Rameshbabu	9.5	72.5
2	1	(China) Lei Tingjie	8.5	67.5
3	5	(FIDE) Kateryna Lagno	8.0	73.5
4	17	(FIDE) Valentina Gunina	8.0	72.5
5	3	(China) Ju Wenjun	8.0	72.5
6	42	(United States) Carissa Yip	8.0	69.5
7	6	(Kazakhstan) Bibisara Assaubayeva	8.0	63.0
8	7	(China) Zhu Jiner	8.0	62.0
9	10	(India) Koneru Humpy	8.0	57.5
10	27	(Germany) Dinara Wagner	7.5	68.5

=== Day 2 - Knockout stage ===
==== Open ====
Quarterfinals
1	(FIDE) Ian Nepomniachtchi	2½
8	(FIDE) Volodar Murzin	½
5	(France) Alireza Firouzja	1
4	(United States) Wesley So	3
3	(Norway) Magnus Carlsen	2½
6	(United States) Hans Niemann	1½
7	(Poland) Jan-Krzysztof Duda	2½
2	(United States) Fabiano Caruana	½

Semifinals
(FIDE) Ian Nepomniachtchi	3
(United States) Wesley So	2
(Norway) Magnus Carlsen	3
(Poland) Jan-Krzysztof Duda	0

Finals
(FIDE) Ian Nepomniachtchi	3½
(Norway) Magnus Carlsen	3½

- Note: After they had played seven games in the final, with the score even, Carlsen and Nepomniachtchi agreed to share the title and both were proclaimed winners.

==== Women's ====
Quarterfinals
1	(India) Vaishali Rameshbabu	2½
8	(China) Zhu Jiner	1½
5	(China) Ju Wenjun	2½
4	(FIDE) Valentina Gunina	½
3	(FIDE) Kateryna Lagno	2½
6	(United States) Carissa Yip	1½
7	(Kazakhstan) Bibisara Assaubayeva	1½
2	(China) Lei Tingjie	2½

Semifinals
(India) Vaishali Rameshbabu	½
(China) Ju Wenjun	2½
(FIDE) Kateryna Lagno	2½
(China) Lei Tingjie	3½

Finals
(China) Ju Wenjun	3½
(China) Lei Tingjie	2½
