= World Rapid Chess Championship =

Annual chess tournament

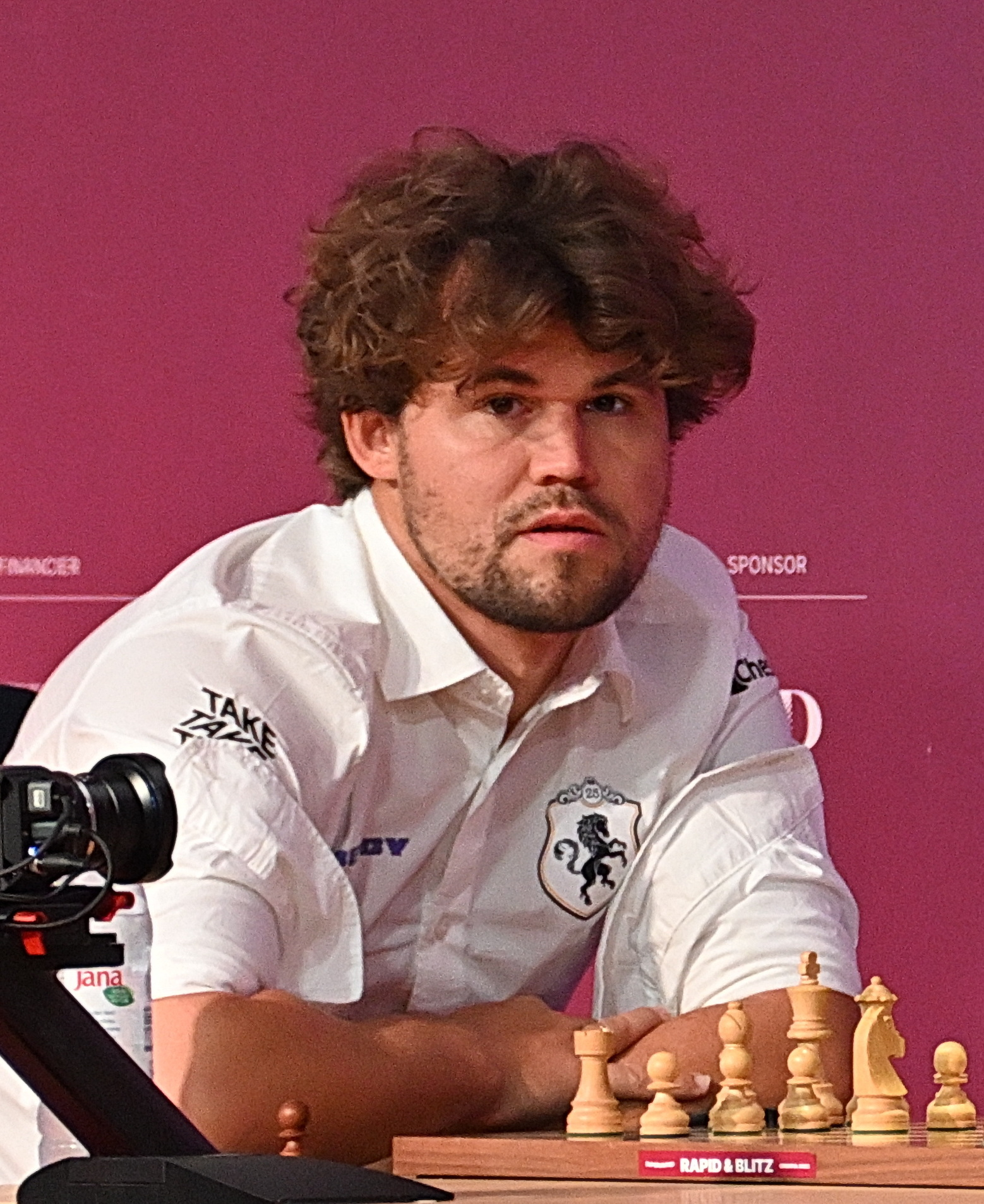
Magnus Carlsen, the current World Rapid Champion.

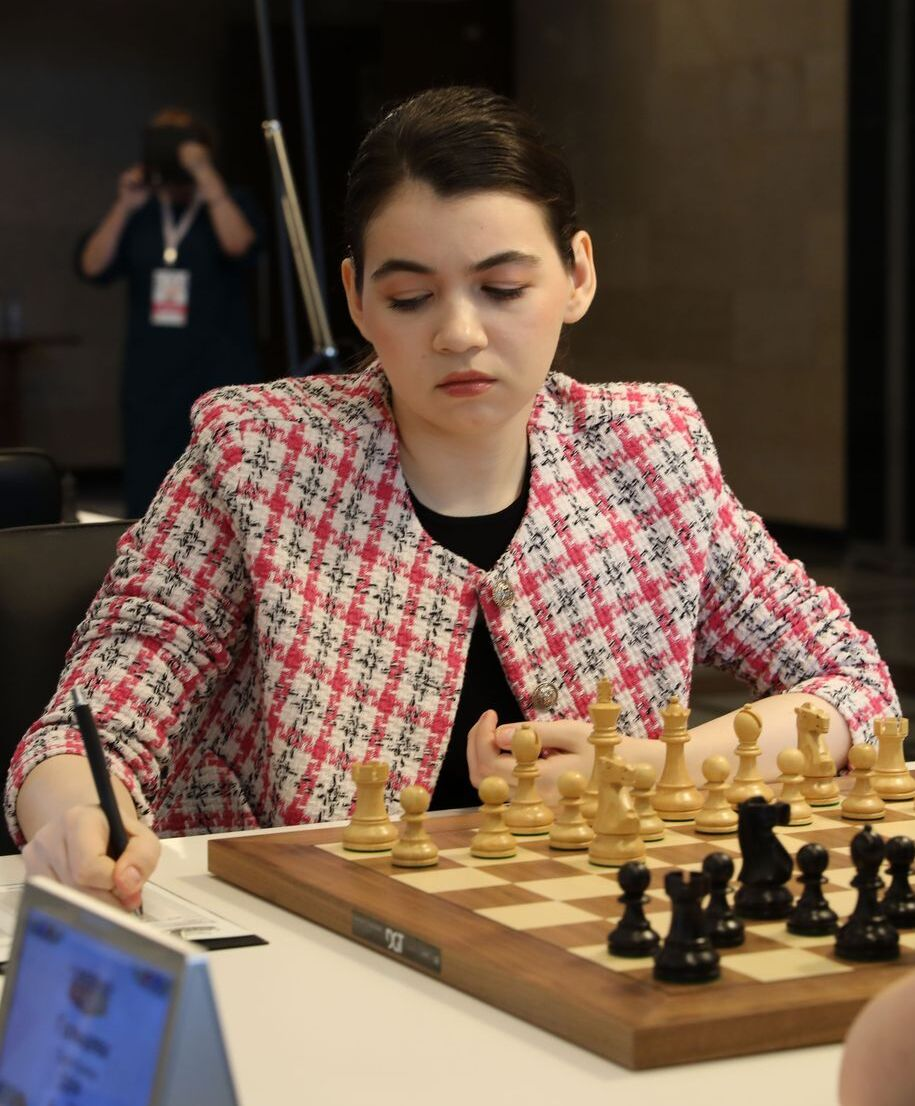
Aleksandra Goryachkina, the current Women's World Rapid Champion.

The World Rapid Chess Championship is a chess tournament held to determine the world champion in rapid chess. Prior to 2012, FIDE sporadically sanctioned a world rapid chess championship. Meanwhile, the non-FIDE-recognized Grenkeleasing Rapid World Championship annually named a world rapid champion of its own each year from 1996 to 2010. Since 2012, FIDE has held an annual joint rapid and blitz tournament, billed as the World Rapid & Blitz Chess Championships. FIDE also holds the Women's World Rapid & Blitz Chess Championship.

The current rapid world champion is GM Magnus Carlsen of Norway. GM Aleksandra Goryachkina of Russia is the current women's rapid world champion. GM Vishwanathan Anand of India holds the record for most championship wins, having won 13 World Rapid titles.

== History ==
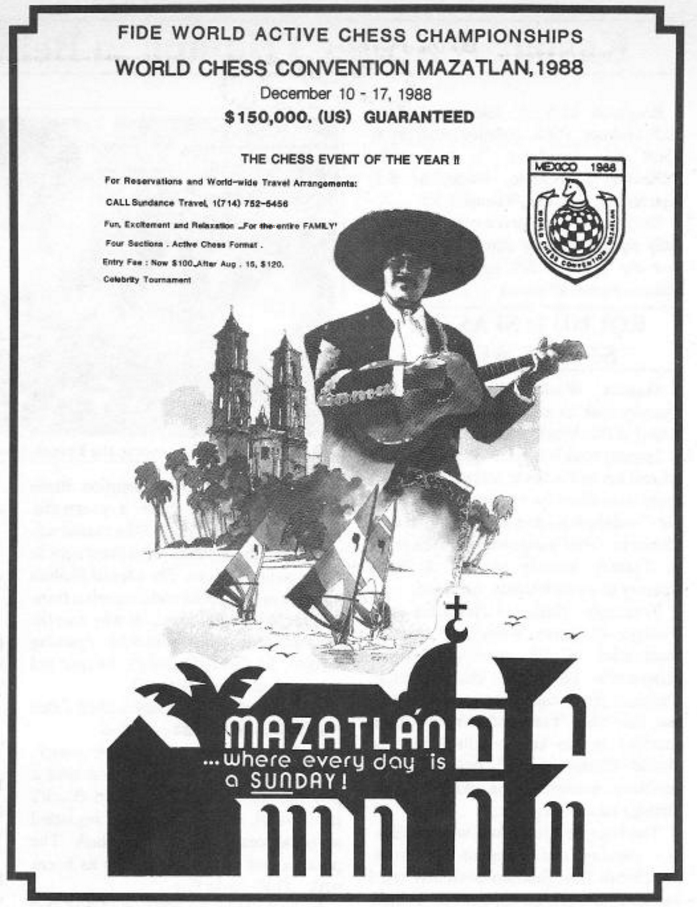
Advertisement for 1988 World Active Chess Championship

The concept of rapid chess (then called "active chess") made its debut at a 1987 FIDE Congress meeting in Seville, Spain. The first official high-profile rapid match took place later that year, when then-world champion Garry Kasparov defeated Nigel Short in the "London Docklands Speed Chess Challenge" at the London Hippodrome. Kasparov won the match with 4 wins, two losses, and no draws in six games.

During the World Active Chess Championship the following year, time controls were set at 30 minutes per player per game. In 1993, following his split from FIDE, world champion Garry Kasparov organized a slightly quicker version of active chess, dubbing it "rapid chess". The Professional Chess Association, Kasparov's competitor to FIDE, subsequently organized two Grand Prix cycles of rapid chess before folding in 1996. Under rapid chess time controls, each player was allowed 25 minutes with an additional 10 seconds after each move. FIDE would adopt these time controls and the "rapid chess" moniker for the rapid tiebreak stages of the 1999 FIDE World Chess Championship.

In 2012, FIDE inaugurated the World Rapid & Blitz Chess Championships, holding the World Rapid Championship alongside the World Blitz Championship. The current time controls for the rapid event is 15 minutes per player with a 10 second increment.

== Grenkeleasing Rapid World Championship ==
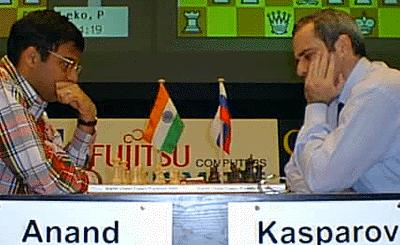
Viswanathan Anand and Garry Kasparov face off in the 2000 edition of the championship

Starting in 1994, the Mainz Chess Classic was an annual series of tournaments hosted by the Chess Tigers in Mainz, Germany. The brainchild of Hans-Walter Schmitt, the Chess Classic featured top-ranked players playing rapid and Fischer Random chess games against computers as well as each other. The main event of the classic was the Grenkeleasing Rapid World Championship (formerly Fujitsu-Siemens), a tournament generally considered as the traditional rapid chess championship in the absence of an annual FIDE-recognized championship. Indian grandmaster Viswanathan Anand holds the record for most championship wins, having won the event 11 times in 15 years — including 9 consecutive victories from 2000 to 2008.

From 1996 to 1998, the Rapid Chess Championship at Frankfurt was organized as a double-round robin, followed by a match between the 1st and 2nd-place finishers for the championship. With the addition of Karpov to the field in 1999, the format was temporarily changed to a pure round-robin, with the 1st-place finisher winning the championship. The following year the field was expanded further to include all ten of the top 10-rated Grandmasters in the world, and was dubbed a Category 21 tournament with an average Elo rating of 2767.

In 2001 the event moved to Mainz, and shifted from a round-robin to a matchplay format - the defending champion Viswanathan Anand defended his title in an eight-game match against the winner of the previous year's Ordix Open, the open rapid tournament. In 2007, with Anand still the rapid champion after six successful title defenses, the event reverted to a double-round robin tournament, with the top two finishers in the semi-finals advancing to the finals. In a homage to the Masters Tournament, the winner of the championship is traditionally awarded a winner's black jacket.

In 2010, the event's final year, the Open GRENKE Rapid Championship featured a field of over 700 players. Shortly afterwards, the Chess Tigers withdrew financial backing for the event, due in part to the effects of the 2008 financial crisis.

Year	Format	Champion	Runner-up	Score
1996	Double round-robin/final	Alexei Shirov (ESP)	Vladimir Kramnik (RUS)	1½–½
1997	Double round-robin/final	Viswanathan Anand (IND)	Anatoly Karpov (RUS)	3–1
1998	Double round-robin/final	Viswanathan Anand (IND)	Vladimir Kramnik (RUS)	4–3^{1}
1999	Quadruple round-robin	Garry Kasparov (RUS)	Viswanathan Anand (IND)	N/A
2000	Double round-robin	Viswanathan Anand (IND)	Garry Kasparov (RUS)	N/A
2001	Matchplay (10 games)	Viswanathan Anand (IND)	Vladimir Kramnik (RUS)	6½–5½^{1}
2002	Matchplay (8 games)	Viswanathan Anand (IND)	Ruslan Ponomariov (UKR)	4½–3½
2003	Matchplay (8 games)	Viswanathan Anand (IND)	Judit Polgar (HUN)	5–3
2004	Matchplay (8 games)	Viswanathan Anand (IND)	Alexei Shirov (ESP)	5–3
2005	Matchplay (8 games)	Viswanathan Anand (IND)	Alexander Grischuk (RUS)	5–3
2006	Matchplay (8 games)	Viswanathan Anand (IND)	Teimour Radjabov (AZE)	5–3
2007	Double round-robin/final	Viswanathan Anand (IND)	Levon Aronian (ARM)	2½–1½
2008	Double round-robin/final	Viswanathan Anand (IND)	Magnus Carlsen (NOR)	3–1
2009	Double round-robin/final	Levon Aronian (ARM)	Ian Nepomniachtchi (RUS)	3–1
2010	Swiss-system tournament	Gata Kamsky (USA)	Vugar Gashimov (AZE)	N/A

^{1} Blitz tiebreaks used to settle the outcome.

== FIDE-recognized events ==
=== Pre-2012 ===
Prior to 2012, FIDE sporadically sanctioned a world rapid chess championship, organizing just three such events. These occurred in 1988, 2001, and 2003. Each of the events was a multi-stage tournament with a preliminary stage followed by an eight-player single-elimination to determine the winner.

World Rapid Chess Championships (pre-2012)
Year	Host city	Champion	Runner-up	Finals score
1988	(Mexico) Mazatlán	Anatoly Karpov (USSR)	Viktor Gavrikov (USSR)	5–5^{1}
2001	(France) Cannes	Garry Kasparov (RUS)	Evgeny Bareev (CAN)	1½–½
2003	(France) Cap d'Agde	Viswanathan Anand (IND)	Vladimir Kramnik (RUS)	1½–½

^{1} Computer tiebreaks used to settle the outcome.

=== World Rapid & Blitz Chess Championships (since 2012) ===
On May 31, 2012, FIDE announced the inaugural World Rapid & Blitz Championships, set to take place in Astana, Kazakhstan from July 1 to 11. The 2012 tournament consisted of a qualifying round, followed by the rapid and blitz events held consecutively over 5 days. In order to promote viewership, time controls were set at 15 minutes per player, rather than the pre-2012 standard of 25 minutes. The championship was originally structured as a 16-player round-robin tournament, set to coincide with the first release of FIDE's rapid and blitz ratings in July 2012; invited were the top 10 players in the FIDE ratings list, the three medalists of the qualification competition, and three wild-card nominees by the organization committee and FIDE.

In 2013, the format was changed to a Swiss tournament with a field of over 100 grandmasters. The top three finishers in the standings are awarded gold, silver, and bronze medals respectively. Various methods of resolving ties have been used and the 2016 edition resulted in all three medallists tied on 11/15 points with the champion being determined by comparing the average rating of each player's opponents. From 2017 onwards, a tie-breaker match has been played in the event of two or more players being tied on points for first place. Only two players may participate in this match, even where three or more players are tied for first place on points. This caused some controversy in the 2021 edition where four players tied for 1st with a score of 9.5/13. A tie-break match for the gold and silver medals was held between Nodirbek Abdusattorov and Ian Nepomniachtchi due to having the highest Buchholz (Cut 1) scores of the four players. Magnus Carlsen, the defending champion, and Fabiano Caruana were therefore unable to participate in the tie-break match despite having the same score as the champion. Carlsen criticised this result as 'idiotic' and called for changes.

=== Editions and medallists ===
==== Open ====
World Rapid Chess Championships (since 2012)
Year	Host city	Champion	Runner-up	Third place
2012	(Kazakhstan) Astana	Sergey Karjakin (RUS)	Magnus Carlsen (NOR)	Veselin Topalov (BUL)
2013	(Russia) Khanty-Mansiysk	Shakhriyar Mamedyarov (AZE)	Ian Nepomniachtchi (RUS)	Alexander Grischuk (RUS)
2014	(United Arab Emirates) Dubai	Magnus Carlsen (NOR)	Fabiano Caruana (ITA)	Viswanathan Anand (IND)
2015	(Germany) Berlin	Magnus Carlsen (NOR)	Ian Nepomniachtchi (RUS)	Teimour Radjabov (AZE)
2016	(Qatar) Doha	Vasyl Ivanchuk (UKR)^{1}	Alexander Grischuk (RUS)	Magnus Carlsen (NOR)
2017	(Saudi Arabia) Riyadh	Viswanathan Anand (IND)^{2}	Vladimir Fedoseev (RUS)	Ian Nepomniachtchi (RUS)
2018	(Russia) Saint Petersburg	Daniil Dubov (RUS)	Shakhriyar Mamedyarov (AZE)	Hikaru Nakamura (USA)
2019	(Russia) Moscow	Magnus Carlsen (NOR)	Alireza Firouzja (Note: Alireza Firouzja competed under the flag of FIDE in the 2019 tournament after the Iranian federation withdrew all Iranian players so that they would not have to face players from Israel.) (FIDE)	Hikaru Nakamura (USA)
2020	Not held due to the COVID-19 pandemic			
2021	(Poland) Warsaw	Nodirbek Abdusattorov (UZB)^{1 2}	Ian Nepomniachtchi (Note: Nepomniachtchi, Kosteniuk and Gunina are Russians, but they competed under the Chess Federation of Russia flag, due to WADA sanctions against Russia.) (CFR)	Magnus Carlsen (NOR)
2022	(Kazakhstan) Almaty	Magnus Carlsen (NOR)	Vincent Keymer (GER)	Fabiano Caruana (USA)
2023	(Uzbekistan) Samarkand	Magnus Carlsen (NOR)	Vladimir Fedoseev (SLO)	Yu Yangyi (CHN)
2024	(United States) New York	Volodar Murzin (Note: Murzin, Grischuk, Nepomniachtchi, Bodnaruk, Lagno, Artemiev and Goryachkina are Russians but competed under FIDE flag due to the organization's ban of the Russian and Belarusian flags as part of its response to the 2022 Russian invasion of Ukraine.) (FIDE)	Alexander Grischuk (FIDE)	Ian Nepomniachtchi (FIDE)
2025	(Qatar) Doha	Magnus Carlsen (NOR)	Vladislav Artemiev (FIDE)	Arjun Erigaisi (IND)
2026	(Turkey) Istanbul			

^{1} Computer tiebreaks used to settle the outcome.

2 Tiebreak games used to settle the outcome.

==== Women ====
Women's World Rapid Chess Championships (since 2012)
Year	Host city	Champion	Runner-up	Third place
2012	(Georgia (country)) Batumi	Antoaneta Stefanova (BUL)	Alexandra Kosteniuk (RUS)	Koneru Humpy (IND)
2013	Not held			
2014	(Russia) Khanty-Mansiysk	Kateryna Lagno (UKR)	Alexandra Kosteniuk (RUS)	Olga Girya (RUS)
2015	Not held			
2016	(Qatar) Doha	Anna Muzychuk (UKR)	Alexandra Kosteniuk (RUS)	Nana Dzagnidze (GEO)
2017	(Saudi Arabia) Riyadh	Ju Wenjun (CHN)	Lei Tingjie (CHN)	Elisabeth Pähtz (GER)
2018	(Russia) Saint Petersburg	Ju Wenjun (CHN)	Sarasadat Khademalsharieh (IRI)	Aleksandra Goryachkina (RUS)
2019	(Russia) Moscow	Koneru Humpy (IND)	Lei Tingjie (CHN)	Ekaterina Atalik (TUR)
2020	Not held due to the COVID-19 pandemic			
2021	(Poland) Warsaw	Alexandra Kosteniuk (CFR)	Bibisara Assaubayeva (KAZ)	Valentina Gunina (CFR)
2022	(Kazakhstan) Almaty	Tan Zhongyi (CHN)	Dinara Saduakassova (KAZ)	Savitha Shri B (IND)
2023	(Uzbekistan) Samarkand	Anastasia Bodnaruk (FIDE)	Koneru Humpy (IND)	Lei Tingjie (CHN)
2024	(United States) New York	Koneru Humpy (IND)	Ju Wenjun (CHN)	Kateryna Lagno (FIDE)
2025	(Qatar) Doha	Aleksandra Goryachkina (FIDE)	Zhu Jiner (China)	Koneru Humpy (IND)
2026	(Turkey) Istanbul			

== Records ==
=== Titles (open) ===
The table below organizes the World Rapid champions in order of championship wins, including all FIDE and Classic events.

Total	Player	Classic		FIDE	
Total	Player	Titles	Year(s)	Titles	Year(s)
13	Viswanathan Anand (IND)	11	1997, 1998, 2000, 2001, 2002, 2003, 2004, 2005, 2006, 2007, 2008	2	2003, 2017
6	Magnus Carlsen (NOR)	0		6	2014, 2015, 2019, 2022, 2023, 2025
2	Garry Kasparov (RUS)	1	1999	1	2001
1	Anatoly Karpov (USSR)	0		1	1988
1	Alexei Shirov (ESP)	1	1996	0	
1	Levon Aronian (ARM)	1	2009	0	
1	Gata Kamsky (USA)	1	2010	0	
1	Sergey Karjakin (RUS)	0		1	2012
1	Shakhriyar Mamedyarov (AZE)	0		1	2013
1	Vasyl Ivanchuk (UKR)	0		1	2016
1	Daniil Dubov (RUS)	0		1	2018
1	Nodirbek Abdusattorov (UZB)	0		1	2021
1	Volodar Murzin (FIDE)	0		1	2024

=== Titles (women) ===
Most Times Champion (including 1992 event)
Titles won	Player	Year(s)
2	Ju Wenjun (CHN)	2017, 2018
2	Koneru Humpy (IND)	2019, 2024
1	Susan Polgar (HUN)	1992
1	Antoaneta Stefanova (BUL)	2012
1	Kateryna Lagno (UKR)	2014
1	Anna Muzychuk (UKR)	2016
1	Alexandra Kosteniuk (CFR)	2021
1	Tan Zhongyi (CHN)	2022
1	Anastasia Bodnaruk (FIDE)	2023
1	Aleksandra Goryachkina (FIDE)	2025

== Other events ==
=== ACP World Rapid Cup ===
Starting in 2007, the Association of Chess Professionals (ACP) sponsored an annual event billed as the ACP World Rapid Cup. The 1st edition of the event was a 16-player knockout tournament, jointly organized by the Pivdenny Bank of Ukraine and the ACP and held in Odesa, Ukraine at the Hotel Londonskaya from 4 January to 8 January 2007. The brainchild of Pivdenny Bank chairman and ACP president Vadim Morokhovsky, the tournament included the top finishers in each year's ACP Tour, a system in which participating players were ranked based on their performances in several chess tournaments held around the world. The remaining participants were chosen on a wildcard basis at the organizers' discretion. From 2007 to 2010, the tournament was held on an annual basis, with the 5th edition of the cup held in 2013.

Despite the ACP Cup's status as a non-FIDE event, FIDE President Kirsan Ilyumzhinov was present at the inaugural edition of the tournament and took part in the opening ceremony. A subsequent agreement between FIDE and the ACP ensured that ACP would be able to use the title "World" when promoting and referring to the tournament.

Time controls were set at 20 minutes per player, with an increment of five seconds. Each match consisted of two rapid games, with the winner progressing to the next round. Ties were resolved by two blitz games, followed by a sudden-death armageddon game. The final match initially consisted of four rapid games, with the same tiebreaks; in 2013, the final was shortened to two rapid games.

Year	Host city	Champion	Runner-up	Score
2007	(Ukraine) Odesa	Peter Leko (HUN)	Vasyl Ivanchuk (UKR)	2½–1½
2008	(Ukraine) Odesa	Teimour Radjabov (AZE)	Alexander Grischuk (RUS)	2½–1½
2009	(Ukraine) Odesa	Boris Gelfand (ISR)	Peter Svidler (RUS)	3–1
2010	(Ukraine) Odesa	Sergey Karjakin (RUS)	Dmitry Andreikin (RUS)	3–3^{1}
2013	(Latvia) Riga	Alexander Grischuk (RUS)	Ian Nepomniachtchi (RUS)	2–2^{1}

^{1} Armageddon game used to settle the outcome.

== See also ==
- World Blitz Chess Championship
- Fast chess
