= Aaron Grabinsky =

American chess player (born 1998)

Personal information
- Born: June 20, 1998 (age 28) Coquille, Oregon

Chess career
- Country: United States
- Title: International Master (2020)
- Peak rating: 2461 (April 2020)

Aaron Grabinsky is an American chess player.

== Career ==
In April 2014, he played in the USCF K-12 National Championship, where he became a National Master and the only scholastic master from Oregon.

In December 2015, he tied for first place with Justus Williams in the K-12 National Championship, ultimately losing the title to Williams on tiebreaks.

In March 2016, he played in the Reno Open, finishing 6th out of 55 players.

In July 2017, he won the Chicago Class championship alongside Sam Schmakel.

In January 2019, he played for the Webster Windmills in the PRO Chess League, where he scored 6/7, the best score for his board.

In January 2020, he tied for second place with a score of 6.5/9 in the Charlotte Open, held in Charlotte, North Carolina, tying with grandmasters Cemil Can Ali Marandi, Andrew Tang, Ulvi Bajarani, and Akshat Chandra.

In January 2022, he won the Open section of the tournament hosted by the Texas Chess Center.

== Personal life ==
His younger brother Joshua is also a chess player, and was the U12 North American Youth Blitz Champion in May 2015.

He attended Webster University on a chess scholarship, studying under Susan Polgar. He then studied mechanical engineering at the University of Texas at Dallas, also playing on their chess team.
