= Péter Prohászka =

Hungarian chess grandmaster (born 1992)

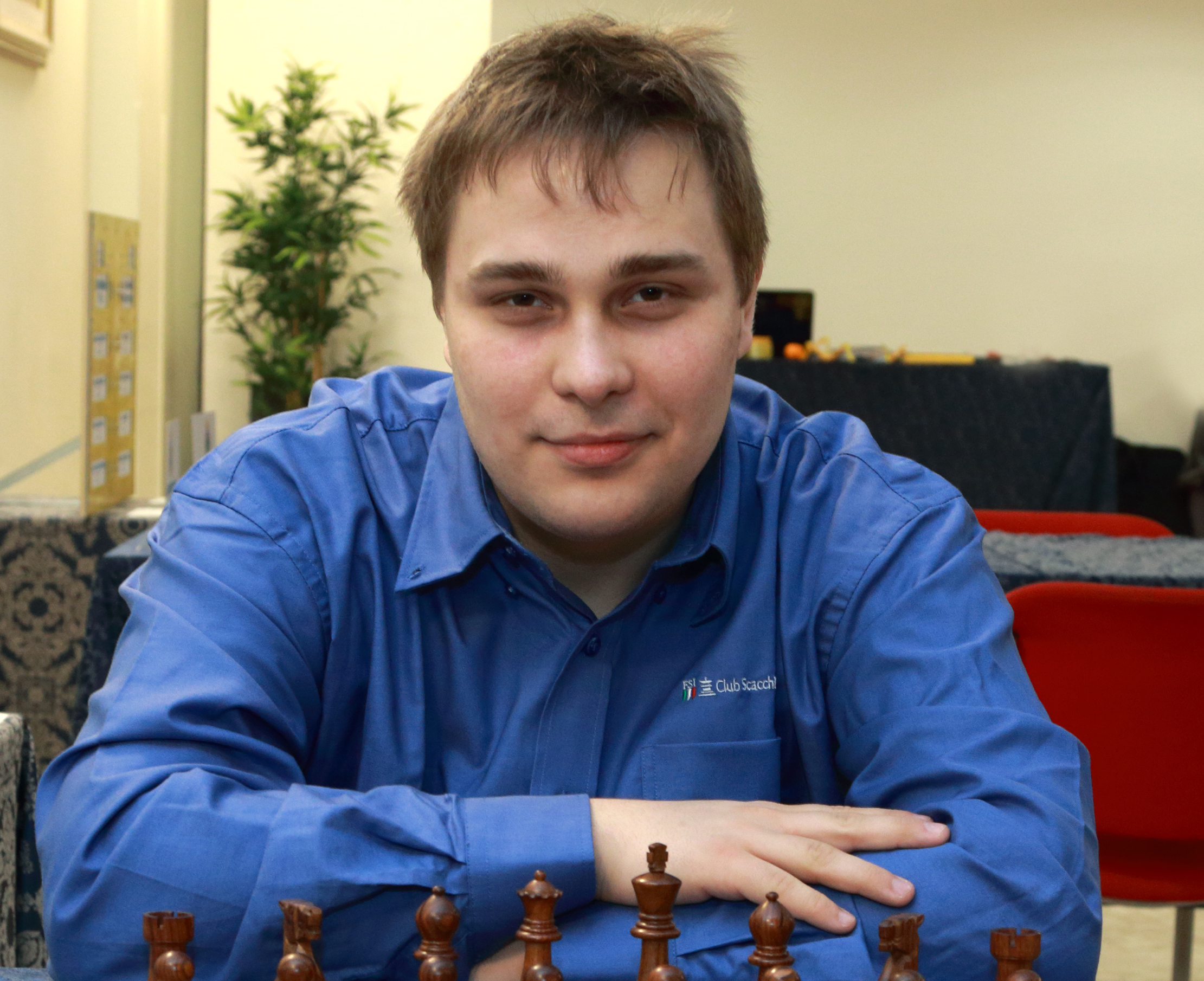
- Péter Prohászka, 2015

Personal information
- Born: 13 January 1992 (age 34) Vác, Hungary

Chess career
- Country: Hungary
- Title: Grandmaster (2010)
- FIDE rating: 2556 (July 2026)
- Peak rating: 2627 (August 2018)

Péter Prohászka (born 13 January 1992) is a Hungarian chess grandmaster.

== Chess career ==
Born in 1992, Prohászka earned his international master title in 2007 and his grandmaster title in 2010. He is the No. 10 ranked Hungarian player as of February 2018.

He won the Xtracon Open in 2014 and the Fano Chess Festival twice.

In 2017, he tied for first at the prestigious Benasque Open.

European U-14 Champion in 2006.

Winner of First Saturday October 2006 (1st GM norm) and First Saturday February 2008 (2nd GM norm).

Winner of First Saturday November 2009 (3rd GM norm).

In 2019, Prohászka won the US Thanksgiving Open tied with Illia Nyzhnyk and Cemil Can Ali Marandi.

In 2021, Prohaszka tied for first place with IM Christopher Yoo in the Memorial Day 2021 CCCSA GM Norm Invitational tournament.
