= FIDE World Cup of Rapid Chess =

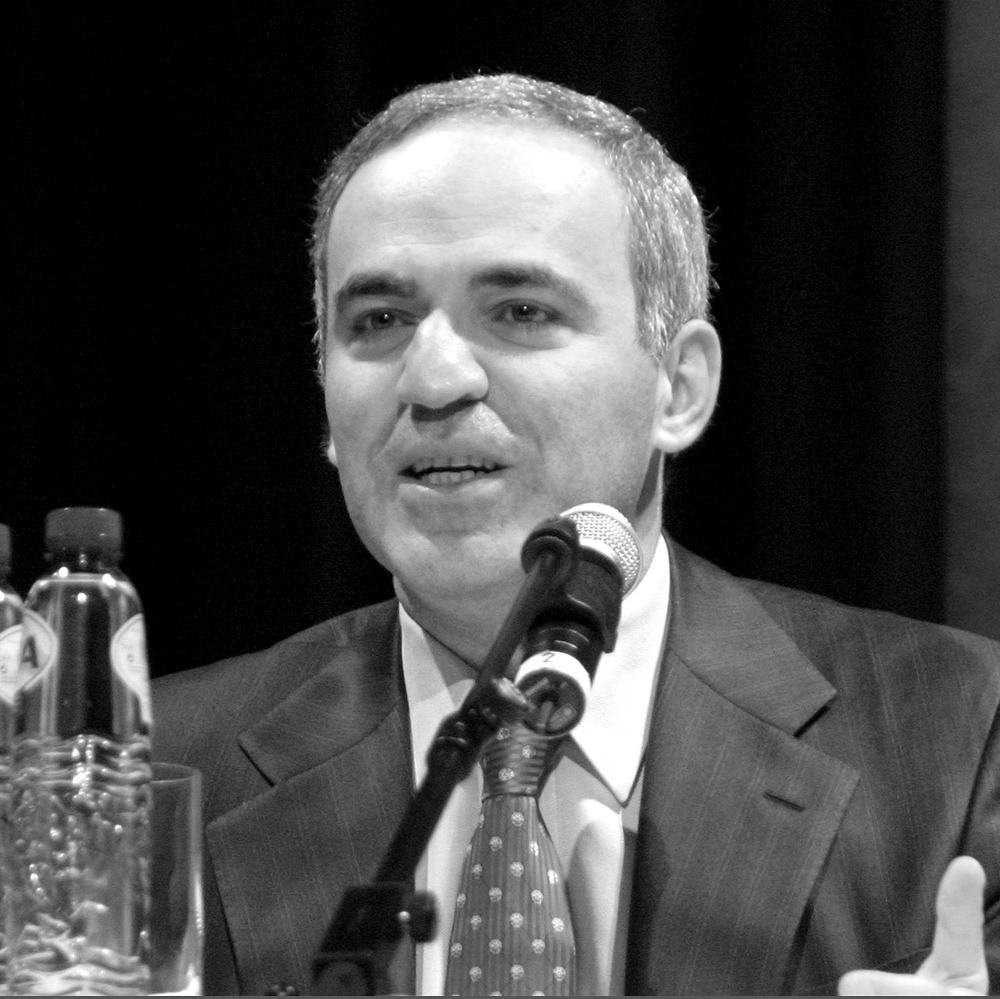
- Garry Kasparov Garry Kasparov

Tournament information
- Sport: Chess
- Location: Cannes, France
- Dates: 21 March 2001–25 March 2001
- Administrator: French Chess Federation, FIDE
- Format: Rapid
- Tournament format(s): Round-robin, Single-elimination
- Participants: 16

Final positions
- Champion: (Russia) Garry Kasparov
- Runner-up: (Canada) Evgeny Bareev

The FIDE World Cup of Rapid Chess was the second FIDE-sanctioned edition of the World Rapid Chess Championship. With support from FIDE, the French Chess Federation organized the 16-player tournament from 21 to 25 March 2001 at Cannes, France. The event attracted a strong field headlined by former World Champion Garry Kasparov, and was organized as a multi-stage tournament. After dominating the preliminary stage, Kasparov won the resulting knockout, defeating Evgeny Bareev 1½–½ in the finals.

== Details ==
The FIDE World Cup of Rapid Chess was organized by the French Chess Federation in conjunction with FIDE, with the FIDE Presidential Board present during the event. The time control for all rapid games was 25 minutes per player, with a 10-second increment starting from move 50.

The tournament began with a preliminary group stage (21-22 March), where the sixteen players were split into two groups of eight players each. Each group played a seven-game round robin, with the top four players from each advancing to an eight-player single-elimination knockout (23-25 March) to determine the champion. Each knockout match was best-of-two games with alternating colors. In case of a tie, the players would play two 5-minute blitz games, also with alternating colors. If still tied, a sudden-death armageddon game, with 6 minutes for White versus 5 minutes for Black, would determine who advances.

With the Amber chess tournament being held concurrently, the world's top players were split between attending both events. Nevertheless, the tournament attracted a strong field headlined by former World Champion and World No. 1, Garry Kasparov. The 16 participants, all of whom are grandmasters, are listed below:

1. Garry Kasparov (RUS), 2849
2. Michael Adams (ENG), 2746
3. Alexander Morozevich (RUS), 2745
4. Evgeny Bareev (RUS), 2709
5. Peter Svidler (RUS), 2695
6. Rustam Kasimdzhanov (UZB), 2693
7. Judit Polgár (HUN), 2676
8. Ye Jiangchuan (CHN), 2671
9. Mikhail Gurevich (BEL), 2663
10. Vladislav Tkachiev (FRA), 2672
11. Alexander Grischuk (RUS), 2663
12. Joel Lautier (FRA), 2658
13. Boris Gulko (USA), 2622
14. Etienne Bacrot (FRA), 2618
15. Christian Bauer (FRA), 2618
16. Hichem Hamdouchi (MAR), 2535

=== Participation of Kasparov ===
The tournament was Kasparov's first FIDE event since the 32nd Chess Olympiad in 1996. Having abstained from FIDE events during this time due to his rift with FIDE, Kasparov insisted that he participated due to his contract with the French Chess Federation.

== Results ==
=== Group A ===
	Player	Rating	1	2	3	4	5	6	7	8	Total	TPR
1	Garry Kasparov (RUS)	2849		1	½	½	1	1	½	1	5½	2893
2	Evgeny Bareev (CAN)	2709	0		1	½	1	1	0	½	4	2733
3	Alexander Grischuk (RUS)	2663	½	0		½	½	1	½	1	4	2739
4	Peter Svidler (RUS)	2695	½	½	½		½	0	1	½	3½	2685
5	Joel Lautier (FRA)	2658	0	0	½	½		½	1	1	3½	2690
6	Judit Polgar (HUN)	2676	0	0	0	1	½		1	1	3½	2687
7	Boris Gulko (USA)	2622	½	1	½	0	0	0		1	3	2645
8	Christian Bauer (FRA)	2618	0	½	0	½	0	0	0		1	2387

In group A, Kasparov's domination of his opponents was on display: he scored 5½/7 (+4–0=3) to finish in clear 1st place, 1½ points ahead of Bareev and Grischuk, who tied for 2nd. However, there was a 3-way tie for 4th place between Svidler, Lautier, and Polgar. The three played a double round-robin blitz tiebreak to decide the final knockout spot, which was won by Polgar.

=== Group A - Blitz Tiebreak ===
	Player	Rating	1	2	3	Points
1	Judit Polgar (HUN)	2676		½ 1	1 0	3½
2	Peter Svidler (RUS)	2754	½ 0		1 1	1½
3	Joel Lautier (FRA)	2759	0 0	1 1		1

=== Group B ===
	Player	Rating	1	2	3	4	5	6	7	8	Total	TPR
1	Michael Adams (ENG)	2746		½	1	½	½	1	½	1	5	2819
2	Mikhail Gurevich (BEL)	2694	½		½	½	1	½	1	1	5	2826
3	Etienne Bacrot (FRA)	2618	0	½		1	½	½	1	1	4½	2781
4	Vladislav Tkachiev (FRA)	2672	½	½	0		½	1	1	1	4½	2773
5	Rustam Kasimdzhanov (UZB)	2693	½	0	½	½		1	1	½	4	2718
6	Hichem Hamdouchi (MAR)	2535	0	½	½	0	0		0	1	2	2533
7	Alexander Morozevich (RUS)	2745	½	0	0	0	0	1		½	2	2503
8	Ye Jiangchuan (CHN)	2671	0	0	0	0	½	0	½		1	2362

In group B, Belgian grandmaster Mikhail Gurevich got off to a fast start with 3 wins in 4 games to finish atop the group with 5/7. Michael Adams achieved the same score, with the two Frenchmen, Bacrot and Tkachiev, a half point behind.

=== Knockout ===
Quarterfinals
(Russia) Garry Kasparov	1½
(France) Vladislav Tkachiev	½
(Belgium) Mikhail Gurevich	3
(Russia) Alexander Grischuk	4
(England) Michael Adams	½
(Hungary) Judit Polgár	1½
(France) Etienne Bacrot	½
(Russia) Evgeny Bareev	1½

Semifinals
(Russia) Garry Kasparov	3
(Russia) Alexander Grischuk	1
(Hungary) Judit Polgár	½
(Russia) Evgeny Bareev	1½

Final
(Russia) Garry Kasparov	1½
(Russia) Evgeny Bareev	½

Kasparov and Bareev were the two players to reach the finals. In game 2 of their match, the two reached a king and pawn endgame where Bareev needed to find the accurate continuation. However, with only two seconds left on his clock to make seven moves, Bareev resigned. Thus, Kasparov won his first World Rapid title.

2001 World Cup of Rapid Chess – Final
Name	Rating	1	2	Total
Garry Kasparov (RUS)	2849	½	1	1½
Evgeny Bareev (RUS)	2709	½	0	½
