= World Rapid Chess Championship 2024 =

Chess tournament in New York

	World Rapid Champion	Women’s World Rapid Champion
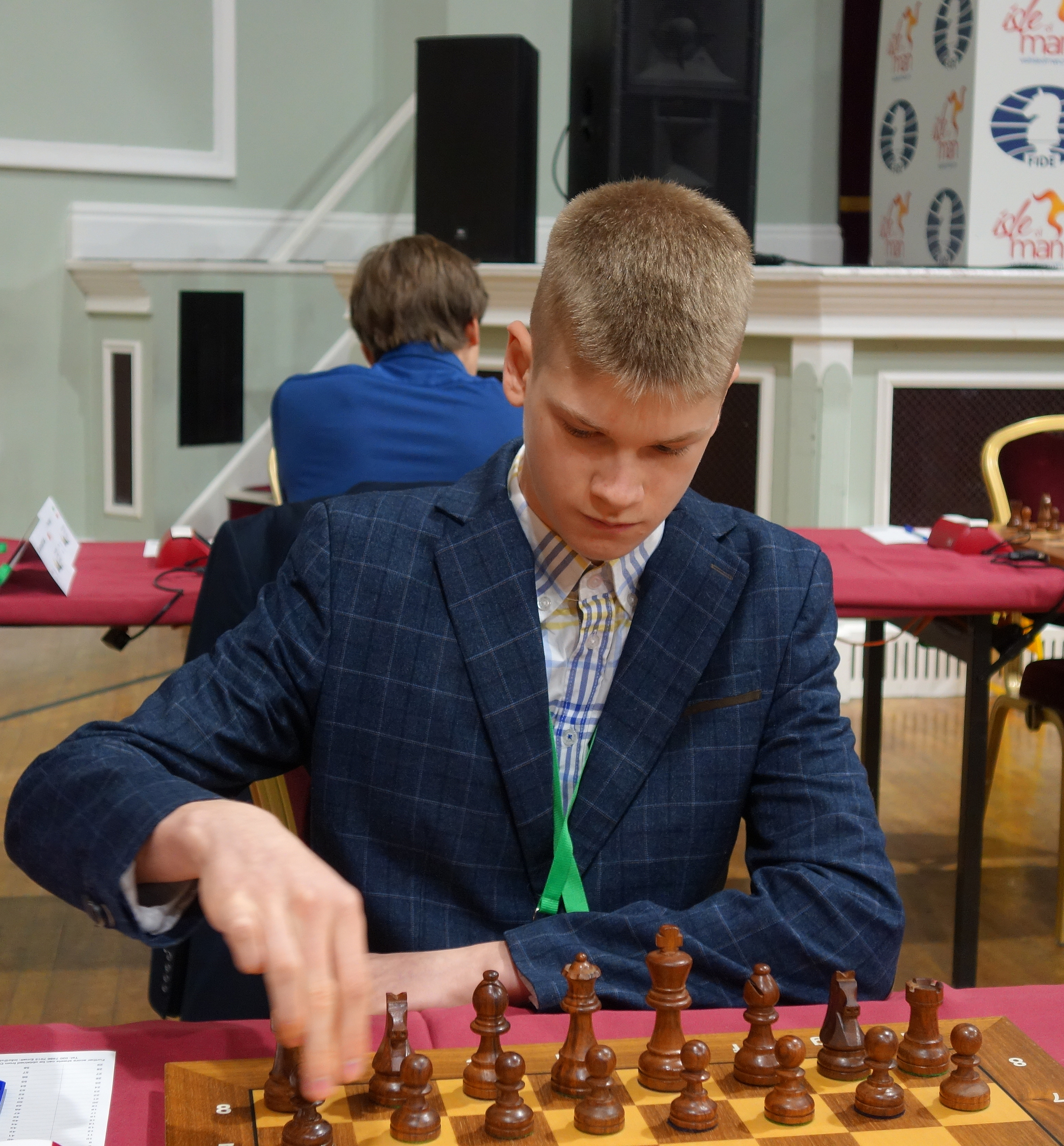
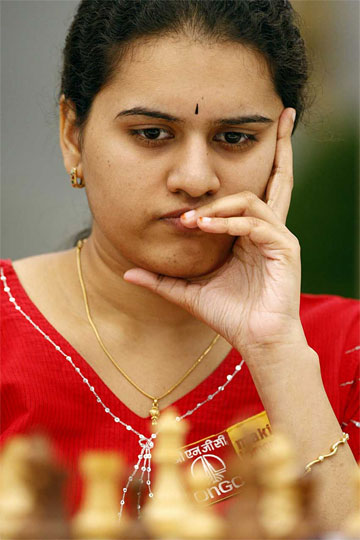
	(FIDE) Volodar Murzin	(India) Koneru Humpy
10/13	Scores	8½/11
	Born 18 July 2006; 18 years old	Born 31 March 1987; 37 years old
	Rating: 2588 (World No. 169)	Rating: 2431 (World No. 13)

The World Rapid Chess Championship 2024 was the 2024 edition of the annual World Rapid Chess Championship held by FIDE to determine the world champions in chess played under rapid time controls. The tournament was held at Cipriani Wall Street in New York City from 26 to 28 December 2024, using a Swiss system with 13 rounds for the open tournament and 11 rounds for the women's tournament. Players eligible to participate in the open tournament had to either be rated at least 2550 Elo in a FIDE rating list during 2024, or be a reigning national champion. The time control was 15 minutes per player with a 10-second per-move increment. Since 2012, FIDE has held the World Rapid and Blitz Championships at a joint tournament.

== Prize Fund ==
The prize fund for both the open and women's tournaments is shown below. In case of a tie all prize money was divided equally between players with the same score.

Open tournament

- 1st place: $90,000
- 2nd place: $70,000
- 3rd place: $56,000
- 4th place: $45,000
- 5th place: $36,000
- 6th place: $29,000
- 7th place: $24,000
- 8th place: $20,000
- 9th place: $17,000
- 10th place: $15,000
- 11th–15th places: $10,000 each
- 16th–20th places: $7,000 each
- 21st–30th places: $4,300 each
- 31st-40th places: $2,000 each

Total: $550,000

Women's tournament

- 1st place: $60,000
- 2nd place: $40,000
- 3rd place: $28,000
- 4th place: $22,000
- 5th place: $18,000
- 6th place: $15,000
- 7th place: $12,000
- 8th place: $9,000
- 9th place: $6,500
- 10th place: $4,000
- 11th–15th places: $1,800 each
- 16th-20th places: $1,000 each
Total: $228,500

== Results ==
The top 20 players in the open division were:

Rank	SNo	Player	Points	TB1
1	59	(FIDE) Volodar Murzin	10	100.5
2	20	(FIDE) Alexander Grischuk	9.5	96.5
3	5	(FIDE) Ian Nepomniachtchi	9.5	91
4	14	(United States) Leinier Dominguez Perez	9	101.5
5	16	(India) Arjun Erigaisi	9	97.5
6	24	(Uzbekistan) Javokhir Sindarov	9	92.5
7	7	(France) Alireza Firouzja	9	92
8	19	(FIDE) Daniil Dubov	9	92
9	41	(Armenia) Karen H. Grigoryan	9	88.5
10	45	(United States) Samuel Sevian	8.5	99.5
11	18	(Netherlands) Anish Giri	8.5	96.5
12	113	(Azerbaijan) Mahammad Muradli	8.5	94.0
13	15	(China) Yu Yangyi	8.5	93.5
14	13	(Azerbaijan) Shakhriyar Mamedyarov	8.5	93.0
15	2	(United States) Fabiano Caruana	8.5	91.0
16	29	(United States) Ray Robson	8.5	91.0
17	17	(India) R Praggnanandhaa	8.5	88.0
18	30	(Ukraine) Olexandr Bortnyk	8.5	86.5
19	4	(China) Wei Yi	8.5	86.0
20	43	(United States) Hans Niemann	8.5	83.5

The top 20 players in the women's division were:

Rank	SNo	Player	Points	TB1
1	10	(India) Koneru Humpy	8.5	63.0
2	1	(China) Ju Wenjun	8.0	75.0
3	8	(FIDE) Kateryna Lagno	8.0	72.0
4	3	(China) Tan Zhongyi	8.0	67.0
5	12	(India) Harika Dronavalli	8.0	65.0
6	4	(Switzerland) Alexandra Kosteniuk	8.0	64.5
7	83	(Uzbekistan) Afruza Khamdamova	8.0	64.0
8	6	(Kazakhstan) Bibisara Assaubayeva	7.5	69.0
9	30	(Indonesia) Irene Kharisma Sukandar	7.5	67.5
10	23	(Greece) Stavroula Tsolakidou	7.5	61.5
11	70	(Peru) Deysi Cori	7.5	61.0
12	11	(Ukraine) Mariya Muzychuk	7.5	58.5
13	35	(Mongolia) Turmunkh Munkhzul	7.0	68.5
14	15	(Germany) Elisabeth Paehtz	7.0	67.5
15	43	(Germany) Dinara Wagner	7.0	63.5
16	26	(Kazakhstan) Meruert Kamalidenova	7.0	62.0
17	14	(Ukraine) Anna Muzychuk	7.0	61.5
18	5	(China) Zhu Jiner	7.0	61.0
19	9	(China) Zhao Xue	7.0	57.5
20	16	(China) Huang Qian	7.0	57.0

== Withdrawal of Magnus Carlsen ==
Following round six of the tournament, defending champion Magnus Carlsen was warned and fined for wearing jeans, which violated the dress code. He refused to change his attire, which prompted the organizers to not pair him for round nine. He had scored 5/8 in the first eight rounds. Instead of continuing the next day, Carlsen decided to withdraw from the tournament, and also announced he would not participate in the World Blitz Chess Championship. FIDE released a statement that the "decision was made impartially and applies equally to all players", noting that participant Ian Nepomniachtchi was fined for wearing sport shoes, and then complied with the rules by changing into approved attire. Carlsen responded in an interview with Levy Rozman, "I am pretty tired of FIDE, so I want no more of this". However, on 29 December, after FIDE altered the dress code to allow jeans, Carlsen reversed his decision and announced that he would take part in the World Blitz Chess Championship, which he went on to win.
