= Chess Classic =

Chess tournament series (1994–2010)

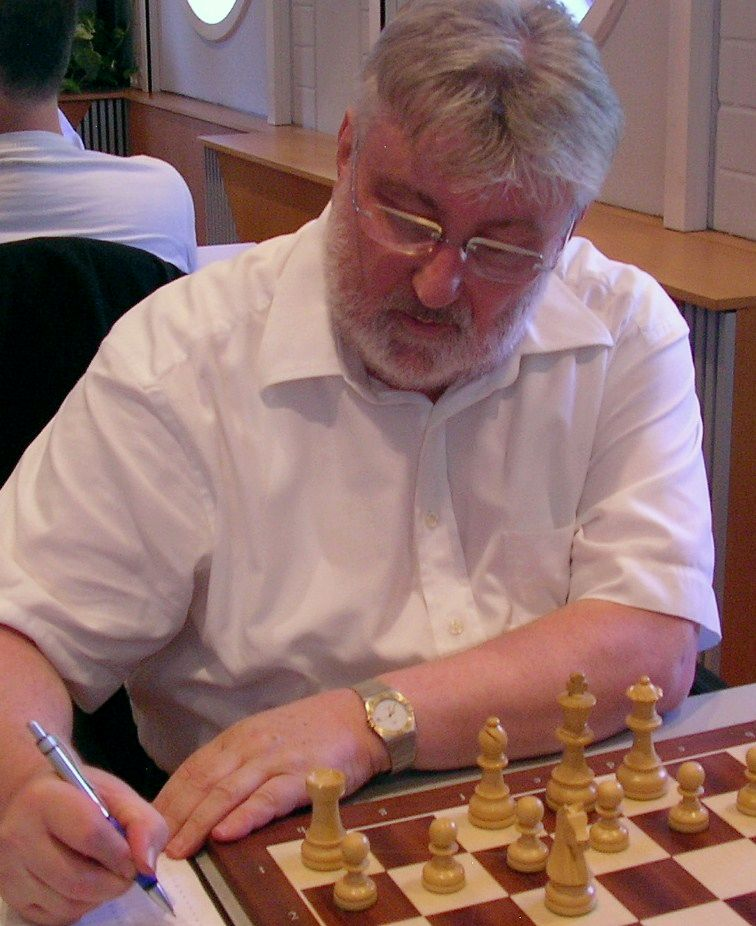
Hans-Walter Schmitt 2011

The Chess Classics were a series of chess tournaments held in Germany, from 1994 to 2010. They were organized by Hans-Walter Schmitt. Among other things, the world champions in rapid chess and Chess960 (also in rapid) and the computer Chess960 world champion were determined at this event.

== Overview ==
The Chess Classic took place a total of seventeen times, seven times in Frankfurt am Main (1994 to 2000) and ten times in Mainz. In Mainz, the event (abbreviated to CCM) was played in the Rheingoldhalle. Hans-Walter Schmitt managed to find sponsorship from Jens Beutel, Lord Mayor of Mainz, and he became patron of the event.

There were different events such as the Chess Classic Championship, Quick Chess Open, Chess960 Rapid Chess World Championships, FiNet Open in Chess960 and Chess960 Computer World Championship. In addition, 13 duels against machine (rapid chess and Chess960) and 26 simultaneous sessions (including Chess960) were conducted.

Pocket Fritz (a chess computer) was created in 2001 in the Rheingoldhalle Mainz. In 2002, Beutel played against Viswanathan Anand on the stage in the Rheingoldhalle; they were both using Pocket Fritz as computer assistance.

== Chess Classic Championship ==
Year	Winner	Second	Third
1996	Alexei Shirov	Vladimir Kramnik	Péter Lékó
1997	Viswanathan Anand	Anatoly Karpov	Eric Lobron
1998	Viswanathan Anand	Vladimir Kramnik	Garry Kasparov
1999	Garry Kasparov	Viswanathan Anand	Vladimir Kramnik
2000	Viswanathan Anand	Garry Kasparov	Vladimir Kramnik
2001	Viswanathan Anand	Vladimir Kramnik	Duel
2002	Viswanathan Anand	Ruslan Ponomariov	Duel
2003	Viswanathan Anand	Judit Polgár	Duel
2004	Viswanathan Anand	Alexei Schirov	Duel
2005	Viswanathan Anand	Alexander Grischuk	duel
2006	Viswanathan Anand	Teimour Radjabov	duel
2007	Viswanathan Anand	Levon Aronian	Rustam Kasimdzhanov
2008	Viswanathan Anand	Magnus Carlsen	Alexander Morozevich
2009	Levon Aronian	Ian Nepomniachtchi	Viswanathan Anand
2010	Gata Kamsky	Vugar Gashimov	Levon Aronian

== Rapid Chess Open ==
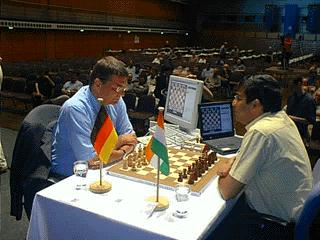
Jens Beutel versus Viswanathan Anand, Rheingoldhalle 2002.

Year	Winner	Second	Third
1994	Alexander Chernin	Lev Gutman	Igor Khenkin
1995	Bogdan Lalić	Larry Christiansen	Alexander Chernin
1996	Eric Lobron	Christopher Lutz	Stefan Djurić
1997	Waleri Beim	Lajos Portisch	Rafael Vaganian
1998	Fritz on Primergy	Stefan Djurić	Alberto David
1999	Loek van Wely	Vadim Milov	Michail Ulybin
2000	Sergei Rublevsky	Mikhail Gurevich	Peter Svidler
2001	Michael Adams	Vadim Milov	Oleg Eismont
2002	Victor Bologan	Igor Glek	Evgeny Agrest
2003	Alexander Grischuk	Ivan Sokolov	Eric Lobron
2004	Alexander Grischuk	Rafael Vaganian	Sergei Rublevsky
2005	Teimour Radjabov	Levon Aronian	Alexander Morozevich
2006	Rustam Kasimdzhanov	Shakhriyar Mamedyarov	Alexander Morozevich
2007	David Navara	Mikhail Mchedlishvili	Krishnan Sasikiran
2008	Ian Nepomniachtchi	Pavel Eljanov	Zoltán Almási
2009	Shakhriyar Mamedyarov	Arkadij Naiditsch	Vladimir Akopian
2010	Gata Kamsky	Vugar Gashimov	Levon Aronian

== Chess960 Rapid chess World Championship ==
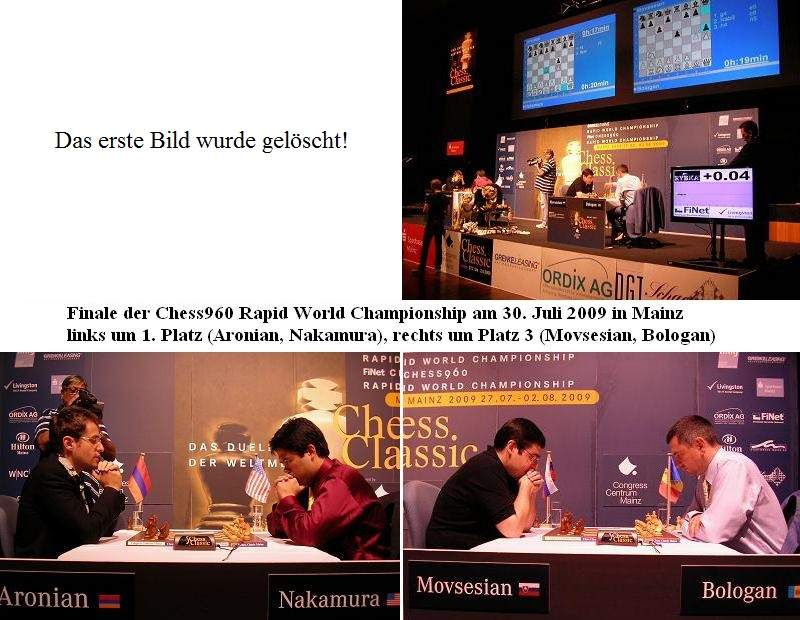
The Chess Tigers and the Final of the Chess960 Blitz chess World Championship 2009

Year	Category	Winner	Second	Third
2001	Open	Péter Lékó	Michael Adams	Duel
2004	Open	Peter Svidler	Levon Aronian	Duel
2005	Open	Peter Svidler	Zoltán Almási	Duel
2006	Open	Levon Aronian	Peter Svidler	Duel
2006	Women	Alexandra Kosteniuk	Elisabeth Pähtz	Duel
2006	Seniors	Vlastimil Hort	Lajos Portisch	Duel
2006	Juniors	Pentala Harikrishna	Arkadij Naiditsch	Duel
2007	Open	Levon Aronian	Viswanathan Anand	Étienne Bacrot
2008	Women	Alexandra Kosteniuk	Kateryna Lagno	Viktorija Čmilytė
2009	Open	Hikaru Nakamura	Levon Aronian	Sergei Movsesian

== FiNet Open Chess960 ==
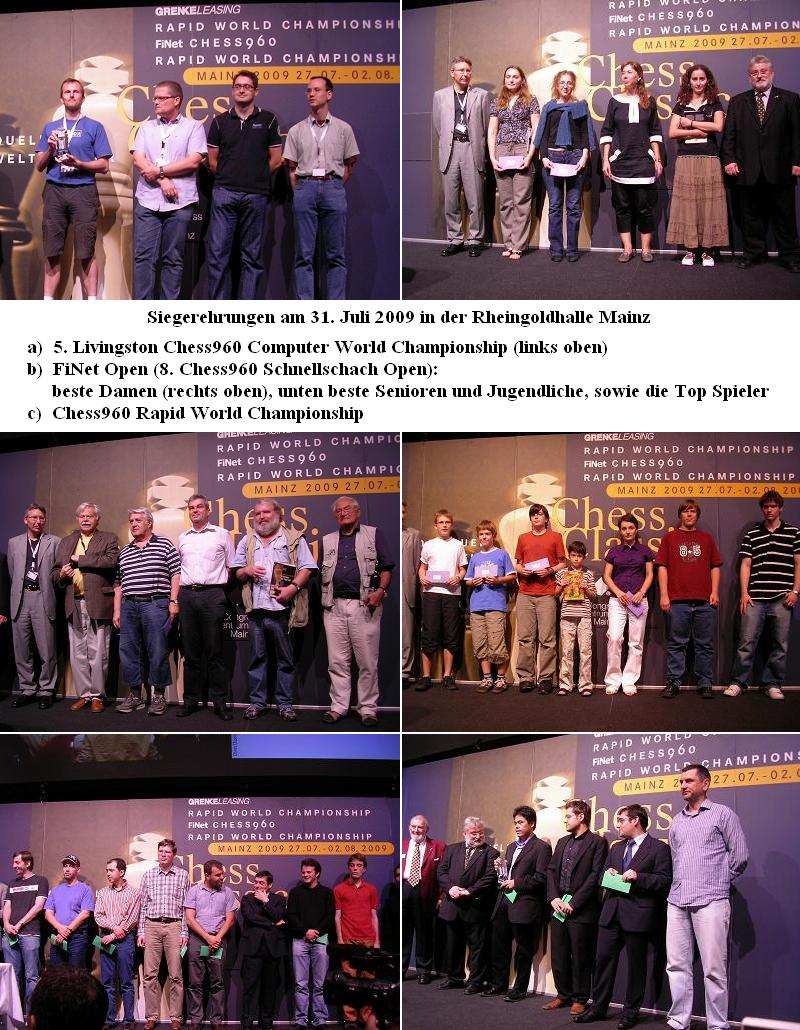
The award ceremony of the 2009 Chess960 world championship

Year	Winner	Second	Third
2002	Peter Svidler	Alexander Motylev	Daniel Fridman
2003	Levon Aronian	Vadim Zvjaginsev	Konstantin Landa
2004	Zoltán Almási	Étienne Bacrot	Mikhail Kobalia
2005	Levon Aronian	Ivan Sokolov	Klaus Bischoff
2006	Étienne Bacrot	Shakhriyar Mamedyarov	Alexander Grischuk
2007	Victor Bologan	Gata Kamsky	Vassily Ivanchuk
2008	Hikaru Nakamura	Sergei Movsesian	Alexander Motylev
2009	Alexander Grischuk	Gata Kamsky	Rustam Kasimdzhanov

== Mini-Ordix und Mini-FiNet Open ==
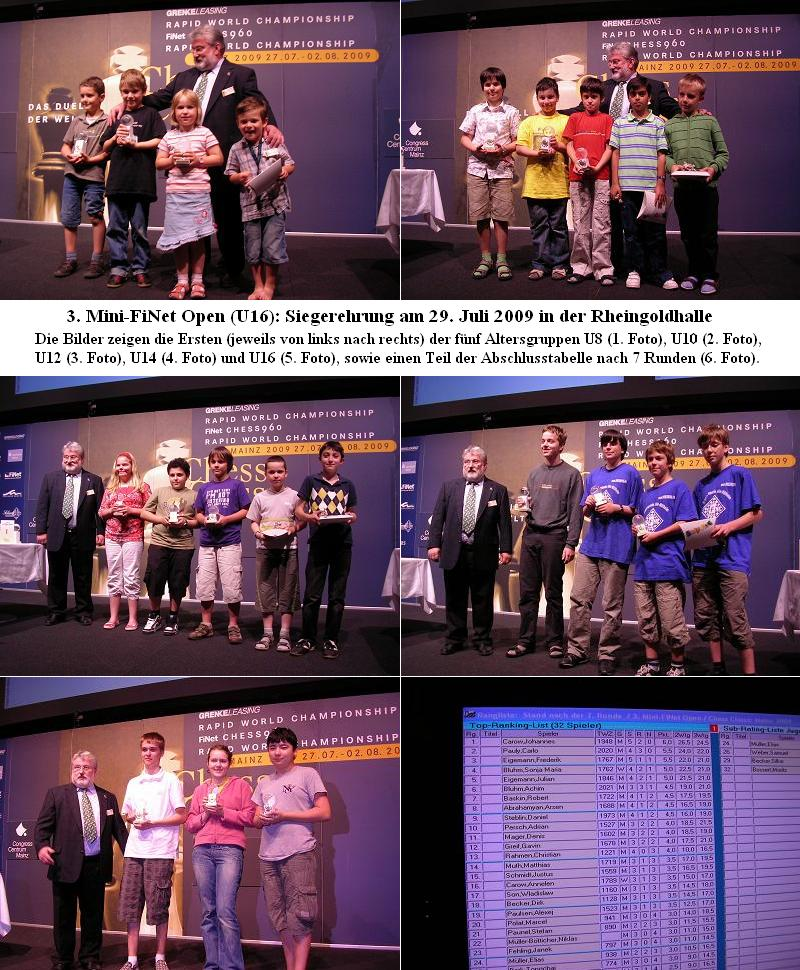
Award ceremony for the Mini-FiNet-Open, 29 July 2009

In the years 2007 to 2009 special talent tournaments took place for the children. These were three Mini Ordix Open and three Mini FiNet Open: 2009 seven rounds with separate scoring in 5 age groups (U16, U14, U12, U10 and U8), and in 2008 and 2007 six rounds each with separate scoring for 4 age groups ( U14, U12, U10 and U8).

1. Mini ORDIX Open U14 (2007) Final score after 6 rounds with 107 participants: Constantin Göbel, Ramil Babayev and Anna Endress. Best in the age groups were: Anna Endress (U14), Constantin Göbel (U12), Stephan Hansch (U10) and Björn-Benny Bauer (U8).

1. Mini FiNet Open U14 (2007) Final score after 6 rounds with 35 participants: Anna Endress, Alexander Jussupow and Constantin Göbel. Best in the age groups were: Anna Endress (U14), Constantin Göbel (U12), Stephan Hansch (U10) and Björn-Benny Bauer (U8).

2. Mini ORDIX Open U14 (2008) Final stage after 6 rounds with 104 participants: Dennis Wagner, Joshua Aarash Hager and Johannes Carow. Best in the age groups were: Joshua Aarash Hager (U14), Dennis Wagner (U12), Alexander Donchenko (U10) and Elias Müller (U8).

2. Mini FiNet Open U14 (2008) Final score after 6 rounds with 26 participants: Sebastian Kaphle, Carlo Pauly and Frederik Eigemann. Best in the age groups were: Sebastian Kaphle (U14), Frederik Eigemann (U12), Alexej Paulsen (U10) and Pascal Karsay (U8).

3. Mini ORDIX Open U16 (2009) Final score after 7 rounds with 72 participants: Alexander Donchenko, Dominik Will and Frederik Eigemann. Best in the age groups were: Matthias Eimer (U16), Dominik Will (U14), Alexander Donchenko (U12), Robert Baskin (U10) and Samuel Weber (U8).

3. Mini FiNet Open U16 (2009) Final score after 6 rounds with 32 participants: Johannes Carow, Carlo Pauly and Frederik Eigemann. Best in the age groups were: Achim Bluhm (U16), Johannes Carow (U14), Sonja Maria Bluhm (U12), Robert Baskin (U10) and Elias Müller (U8).

== Chess960 Computer World Championship ==
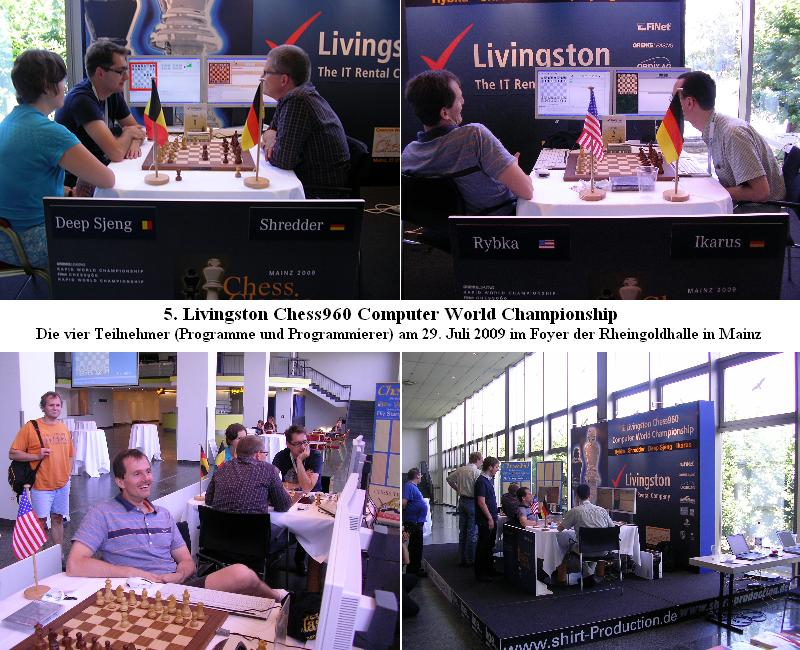
5. Livingston Chess960 Computer World Championship 2009 in Mainz. The 4 Programmes Deep Thought, Shredder, Rybka and Ikarus With their Programmers

As the highlight of the different show battles between humans and computers and humans versus computers, the Chess960 Computer World Championships in Mainz were held from 2005 to 2009.

Year	Winner	Second	Third
2005	Spike (Volker Böhm, Ralf Schäfer)	Jonny (Johannes Zwanzger)	Glaurung (Tord Romstad)
2006	Shredder (Stefan Mayer-Kahlen)	Jonny (Johannes Zwanzger)	Ikarus (Muntsinn & Munjong Kolss)
2007	Rybka (Vasik Rajlich)	Shredder (Stefan Mayer-Kahlen)	Spike (Volker Böhm, Ralf Schäfer)
2008	Rybka (Vasik Rajlich)	Shredder (Stefan Mayer-Kahlen)	Naum (Alexander Naumov)
2009	Rybka (Vasik Rajlich)	Shredder (Stefan Mayer-Kahlen)	Deep thought (Gian-Carlo Pascutto)
