= Ulvi Bajarani =

Azerbaijani chess grandmaster (born 1995)

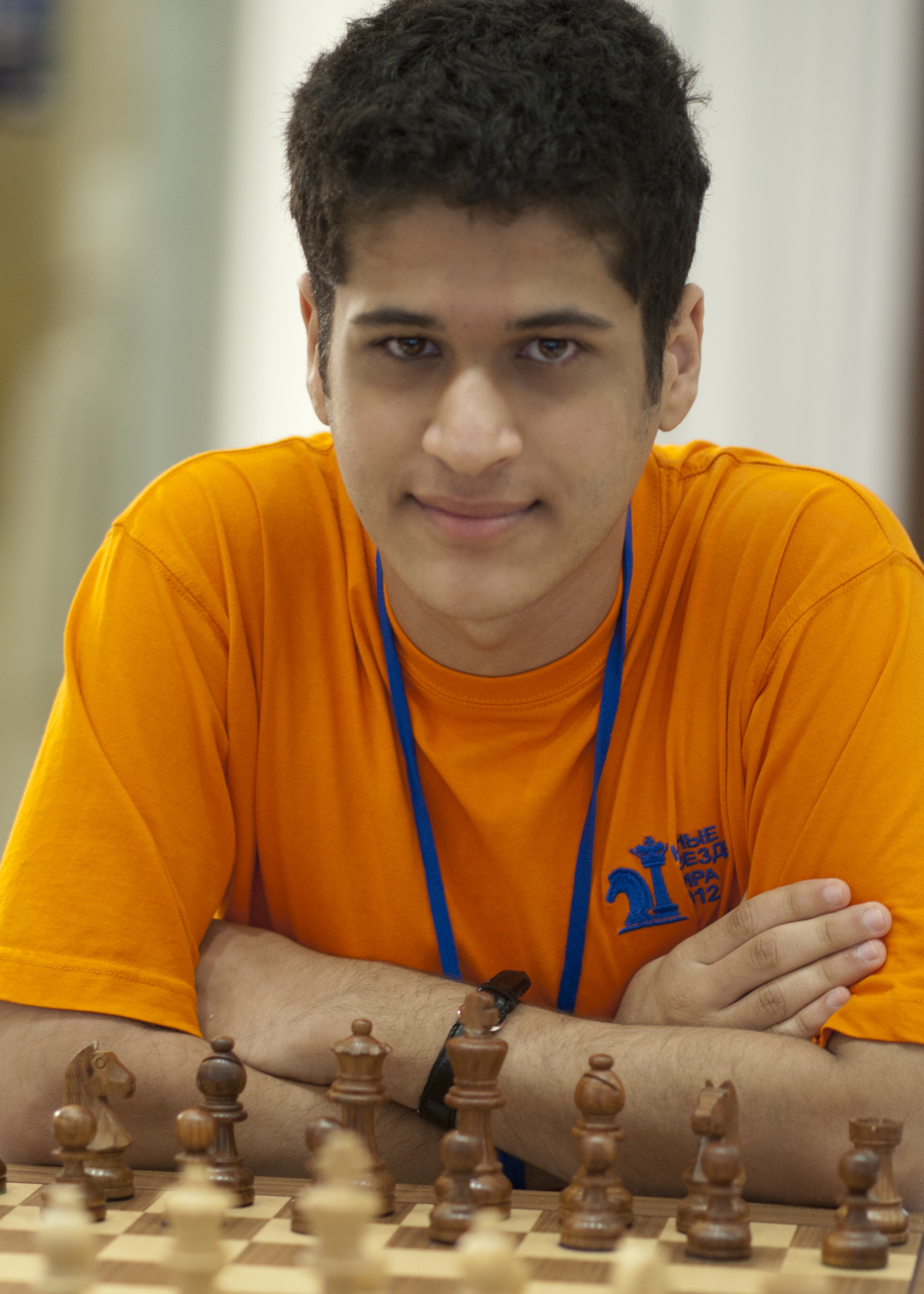

Personal information
- Born: January 27, 1995 (age 31) Baku, Azerbaijan

Chess career
- Country: Azerbaijan
- Title: Grandmaster (2013)
- FIDE rating: 2423 (July 2026)
- Peak rating: 2551 (November 2015)

Ulvi Bajarani (Azerbaijani: Ülvi Bacarani; born January 27, 1995) is an Azerbaijani chess Grandmaster. He received the FIDE Master title in 2005, the International Master title in 2010, and the Grandmaster Title in 2013.

== Chess career ==
He started his chess career in 2000 with the help of his father, the International Master Ilgar Bajarani, who has been his main coach during the entire career.

Ulvi played for Azerbaijan-2 team in the 42nd Chess Olympiad in Baku (+2, =1, -2).

He won several tournaments:

- He won Baku Championships twice in U10 category in 2004 and 2005;
- He won 4 medals in the World and Europe Youth Championships: the bronze medal in the U10 category of World Youth Championship in 2005 (Belfort, France), the silver medal in the U10 category of Europe Youth Championship in 2005 (Herceg Novi, Serbia and Montenegro), the bronze medal in U12 category of Europe Youth Championship in 2006 (Herceg Novi, Montenegro), and the silver medal in U12 category of World Youth Championship in 2007 (Sibenik, Croatia);
- He won the Azerbaijan Youth Championships in the U14 (2009) and U18 (2013) categories.
- He won the Azerbaijan Junior Championship in the U20 (2009) category;
- He won the Azerbaijan Championship in 2014.
- He won the “Brasschaat open” (Brasschaat, Belgium, 2015);
- He was a member of the UTRGV I team that won the Texas Superfinals tournament held in Lubbock, TX, USA in 2021.

== Academic career ==
He is graduated from the 126th middle school named after Tarlan Heybatov in 2012. In the same year, he applied to the Pharmacy faculty in the baccalaureate of Azerbaijan Medical University named after Nariman Narimanov and graduated from there in 2016. He applied to the Master of Science program in Information Technology at University of Texas Rio Grande Valley in 2019 and graduated from there in 2021.
