= Titas Stremavičius =

Lithuanian chess grandmaster (born 1998)

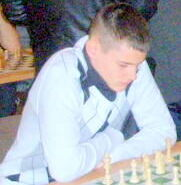
- Titas Stremavičius in 2014

Personal information
- Born: 15 February 1998 (age 28) Kaunas, Lithuania

Chess career
- Country: Lithuania
- Title: Grandmaster (2020)
- FIDE rating: 2555 (July 2026)
- Peak rating: 2567 (December 2024)

Titas Stremavičius (born 15 February 1998) is a Lithuanian chess player who holds the title of Grandmaster. He won the Lithuanian Chess Championship in 2021, 2025 and 2026.

== Biography ==
Stremavičius has participated multiple times in the European Youth Chess Championships and World Youth Chess Championships in different age categories. His main achievement is the bronze medal of the 2015 European Youth Chess Championship in the category under 18 (shared 2nd-3rd places with Manuel Petrosyan and lost the tie-break).

Stremavičius won the Lithuanian Chess Champion in 2021 and 2025. He is silver medalist of the Lithuanian Chess Championships in 2015 and 2016 (in 2016, he shared 1st-2nd places with Tomas Laurušas and lost on additional indicators).

Stremavičius won the Baltic Cup 2014, earning an International Master norm.

Stremavičius has also won open chess tournaments in Lichtenrade (2015), Panevėžys (2018), and participated in a large shared of 1st place in the open tournament in Charlotte (2021).

He has won international chess tournaments in Panevėžys (2016), Charlotte (2018, 2019 and 2022, tied 1st-2nd with Jennifer Yu in 2018), with Zhou Jianchao in 2022), St. Louis (2019), New York City (2021).

In 2023, in Kaunas, he won the silver medal in the Lithuanian Chess Championship.

Titas Stremavičius played for Lithuania in the Chess Olympiads:

- In 2018, at fourth board in the 43rd Chess Olympiad in Batumi (+4, =5, -0),
- In 2022, at second board in the 44th Chess Olympiad in Chennai (+3, =5, -2).

In 2015, he was awarded the FIDE International Master (IM) title and received the FIDE Grandmaster (GM) title five years later.

Stremavičius qualified for the Chess World Cup 2025 where he caused a major upset, defeating fifth seed Wesley So in the second round.
