= 1988 in chess =

Events in chess in 1988.

== Top players ==
Kasparov and Karpov remained the top two players in the world, positions that they had held since July 1982. Over the year, Dutch player Jan Timman and Alexander Beliavsky of the USSR moved up the list, whilst Andrei Sokolov from the USSR and Ljubomir Ljubojević of Yugoslavia moved down.

January 1988 FIDE rating list. Top 11 players

Elo	FIDE Top Eleven Men	FIDE Top Eleven Women	Elo
2750	Garry Kasparov (URS)	Maia Chiburdanidze (URS)	2560
2715	Anatoly Karpov (URS)	Nona Gaprindashvili (URS)	2485
2675	Jan Timman (NED)	Zsuzsa Polgar (HUN)	2475
2645	Alexander Beliavsky (URS)	Nana Ioseliani (URS)	2455
2640	Viktor Korchnoi (CHE)	Pia Cramling (SWE)	2435
2630	Mikhail Tal (URS)	Ketevan Arakhamia (URS)	2420
2630	Predrag Nikolić (YUG)	Nana Alexandria (URS)	2415
2630	Nigel Short (ENG)	Marta Litinskaya-Shul (URS)	2415
2625	Artur Yusupov (URS)	Elena Akhmilovskaya (URS)	2400
2625	Jon Speelman (ENG)	Agnieszka Brustman (POL)	2395
2625	Mikhail Gurevich (URS)	Anna Akhsharumova (USA)	2385

== Events ==
The following major chess tournaments took place in 1988:

=== Grandmasters Association World Cup ===
The first three tournaments of the Grandmasters Association's World Cup were held in 1988, with some of the world's best players invited.

- 1 April – 22 April: The first tournament was held in Brussels and won by Karpov with 11/16, ahead of Valery Salov with 10.
- 14 June – 3 July: The second tournament was held in Belfort, France, and won by Kasparov with 11½/15, ahead of Karpov with 10½.
- 3 October – 24 October: The third tournament was held in Reykjavík and was again won by Kasparov, with 11/17. Beliavsky was second, with 10½/15.

=== 28th Chess Olympiad ===
The 28th Chess Olympiad in Thessaloniki, Greece, was held between 12 November and 30 November. It was won by the USSR, ahead of England in second and the Netherlands in third.

The gold medal on the first board was won by Kasparov of USSR with 8½/10. Lajos Portisch of Hungary was second, also scoring 8½, but from 11 games.

The Women's Chess Olympiad was held alongside the open tournament. The winners were Hungary, ahead of the USSR and Yugoslavia.

=== Other major tournaments ===
- 23 February – 8 March: The Linares tournament was won by Timman with 8½/11, ahead of Beliavsky with 7.
- 6 September – 28 September: The 12th Tilburg tournament was won by Karpov with 10½/14, ahead of Short with 8½.
- December 1988 – January 1989: The Reggio Emilia tournament was won by Mikhail Gurevich with 6½/9, ahead of Kiril Georgiev and Ulf Andersson Ivanchuk with 5½.
- The Wijk aan Zee tournament was won by Karpov with 9/13, ahead of Anderssen with 8½.

== Titles awarded ==
=== Grandmaster ===
In 1989, FIDE awarded the Grandmaster title to the following 20 players:

- Viswanathan Anand (born 1969) India
- Zurab Azmaiparashvili (born 1960) Georgia
- Emir Dizdarevic (born 1958) Yugoslavia
- Yury Dokhoian (1964–2021) Soviet Union
- Boris Gelfand (born 1968) Soviet Union
- Krum Georgiev (born 1958) Bulgaria
- Jörg Hickl (born 1965) Germany
- Julian Hodgson (born 1963) England
- Miguel Illescas (born 1963) Spain
- Gregory Kaidanov (born 1959) Ukraine/United States
- Stefan Kindermann (born 1959) Germany
- Josef Klinger (born 1967) Austria
- Bogdan Lalić (born 1964) Croatia/England
- Valentin Lukov (born 1955) Bulgaria
- Gilberto Milos (born 1963) Brazil
- Michael Rohde (born 1959) United States
- Harry Schussler (born 1957) Sweden
- Elizbar Ubilava (born 1950) Georgia/Spain
- Reynaldo Vera (born 1961) Cuba
- Michael Wilder (born 1962) United States

In addition George Koltanowski (born 1903) was awarded an honorary Grandmaster title in 1988.

== Births ==
The following chess grandmasters were born in 1988:

- 9 January Viktor Láznička Czech Republic
- 5 February Markus Ragger Austria
- 8 February Arik Braun Germany
- 14 February Evgeny Romanov Russia
- 14 February Adam Tukhaev Ukraine
- 3 March Timur Gareev Uzbekistan
- 11 March Ante Brkić Croatia
- 11 March Alexandr Fier Brazil
- 14 April Pawel Czarnota Poland
- 18 April Yuriy Ajrapetjan Ukraine
- 20 April Mark Bluvshtein Canada
- 21 April Subramanian Arun Prasad India
- 26 April Boban Bogosavljević Serbia
- 26 April Rauf Mamedov Azerbaijan
- 30 April Denes Boros Hungary
- 13 May Luka Lenič Slovenia
- 11 June Zhou Jianchao China
- 21 June Alejandro Ramírez Costa Rica
- 7 July Wen Yang China
- 8 August Marin Bosiočić Croatia
- 23 August Dmitry Kononenko Ukraine
- 6 September Valentin Iotov Bulgaria
- 9 September Bassem Amin Egypt
- 27 September David Baramidze Germany
- 11 November Yuri Vovk Ukraine
- Anatoly Bykhovsky Israel
- Nikolai Chadaev Russia
- Laszlo Gonda Hungary
- Vitaliy Kiselev Russia
- Daniel Alsina Leal Spain
- Wojciech Moranda Poland
- Ioannis Papadopoulos Greece
- Pavel Ponkratov Russia
- Deep Sengupta India

== Deaths ==
The following leading chess personalities died in 1988:

- 30 June Bernardo Wexler (born 1925): Argentine International Master who was the 1959 national champion and played in three Olympiads.
- 27 November Jan Hein Donner (born 1927): Dutch Grandmaster who won the Dutch Championship in 1954, 1957 and 1958.

== Other events ==
- The German chess magazine, Deutsche Schachzeitung ceased publication in December 1988, having been published regularly since 1846.
- The musical Chess premiered on Broadway in April 1988. It closed in June 1988.

== See also ==
- Corus Chess Tournament
- Linares chess tournament
- List of strong chess tournaments
