= Chess World Cup 2007 =

Chess tournament in Khanty-Mansiysk, Russia

FIDE Chess World Cup 2007
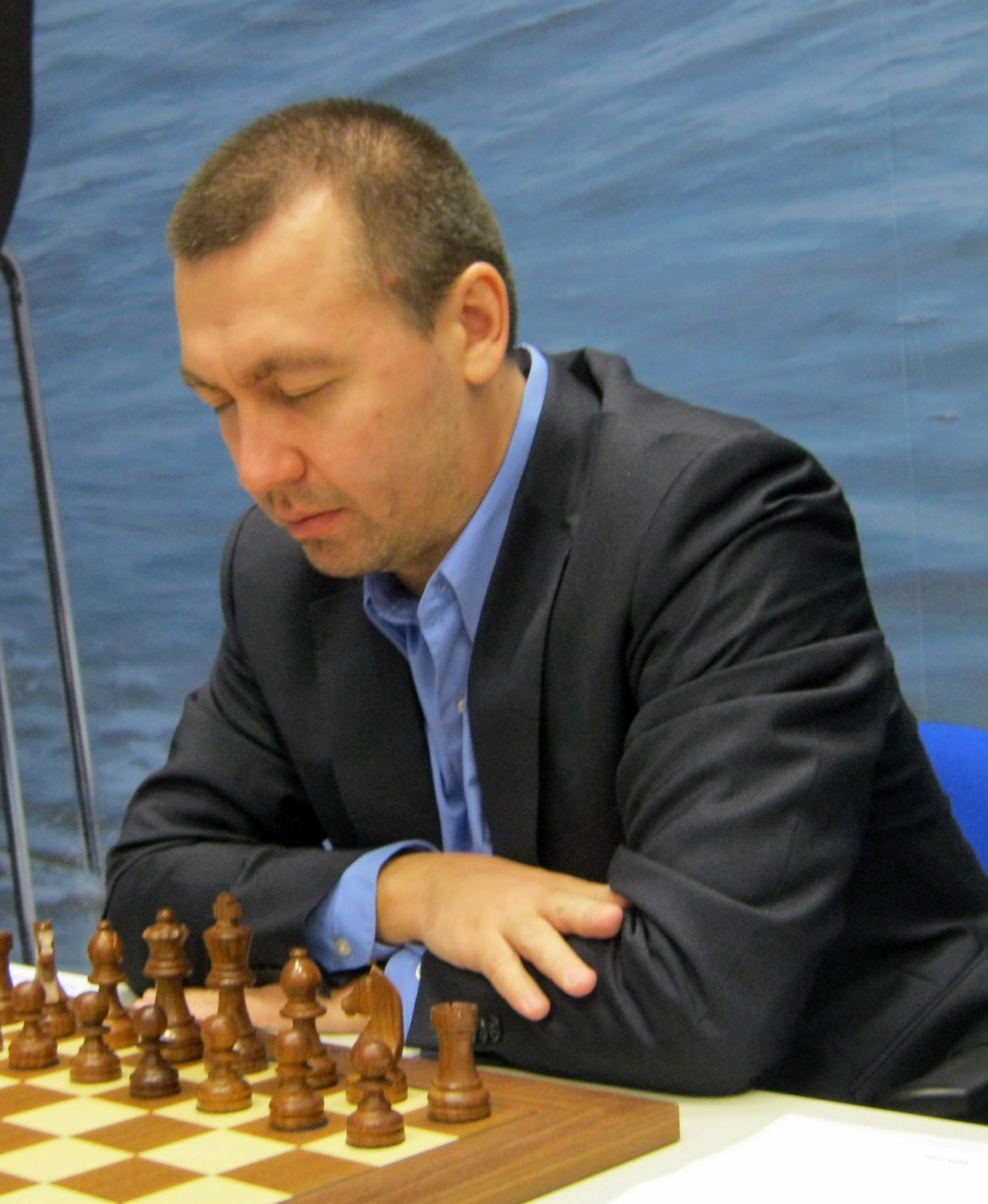
- 2007 FIDE World Cup winner Gata Kamsky

Tournament details
- Country: Russia
- City: Khanty-Mansiysk
- Dates: 24 November – 16 December 2007
- Format: Single-elimination
- Participants: 128

Final positions
- Champions: (United States) Gata Kamsky
- Runners-up: (Spain) Alexei Shirov

The Chess World Cup 2007 served as a qualification tournament for the World Chess Championship 2010. It was held as a 128-player single-elimination tournament, between 24 November and 16 December 2007, in Khanty-Mansiysk, Russia.

In an event attended by most leading players of the world, American Gata Kamsky emerged as the winner. He was unbeaten in the tournament, going into tie-break only once and defeating Spaniard Alexei Shirov, 2½–1½, in the four-game final. Two 17-year-old players, Sergey Karjakin and Magnus Carlsen, reached the semifinals.

By winning, Kamsky qualified for the Challenger Match, the final stage in determining the challenger for the World Chess Championship 2010; his participation in that match allowed him direct entry into the Candidates Matches for the World Chess Championship 2012.

The final four also received direct entry into the FIDE Grand Prix 2008–10, a qualifying stage for the World Chess Championship 2012.

The winner of the Chess World Cup 2005, Levon Aronian, was defeated by Dmitry Jakovenko in the fourth round.

== Background ==
The 2007 World Cup was part of the cycle for the World Chess Championship 2010. Gata Kamsky, as the winner of this tournament, played an eight-game match against Veselin Topalov in 2008, for the right to be the challenger for the World Chess Championship 2010. Ultimately Topalov won the match and faced World Champion Viswanathan Anand, who successfully defended his title against former champion Vladimir Kramnik at the World Chess Championship 2008.

== Prominent non-participants ==
Vladimir Kramnik and Veselin Topalov were ineligible to participate, due to special privileges they already had in the 2008–2010 World Championship cycle.

All other leading players, including world champion Viswanathan Anand, were eligible to participate. However Anand, who was already seeded into the 2008–2010 cycle, elected not to play.

Three other players who had recently competed in the World Chess Championship 2007 in Mexico – Péter Lékó, Aleksandr Morozevich and Boris Gelfand – elected not to play. Lékó and Morozevich refused to take part as a form of protest against the special privileges given for the inclusion of Kramnik and Topalov in the World Chess Championship Cycle.

The only other player from the Top 30 who did not participate was Judit Polgár.

== Qualification ==
The final list of 128 qualifiers for the World Cup was as follows:

- Three of the eight participants of the World Chess Championship 2007 (Levon Aronian, Peter Svidler, Alexander Grischuk). The other five qualifiers in this category were replaced by five players from the average rating list.
- Women's World Champion 2006 (Xu Yuhua).
- Junior World Champion 2006 (Zaven Andriasian).
- Twenty-five players with the highest Elo rating (including five replacements). The average ratings from July 2006 and January 2007 were used.
- 89 players qualified from the continental and zonal championships:
  - 45 players from Europe (16 from the 2006 European Individual Chess Championship and 29 from 2007)
  - 19 players from the Americas (7 from the 4th American Continental Championship, 12 from the 2.1 through 2½ Zonals),
  - 19 players from Asia and Oceania (10 from the 6th Asian Championship, 9 from the 3.1 through 3.6 Zonals),
  - 6 players from Africa (2007 African Championship).
- 5 nominees of the FIDE President (Sergei Rublevsky, Evgeny Bareev, Sergei Zhigalko, Ziaur Rahman, and Boris Savchenko).
- 4 nominees of the local Organising Committee (Evgeny Alekseev, Nikolai Kabanov, Aleksei Pridorozhni, and Vladimir Genba).

The individual Zones (for Zonals) are described in the FIDE handbook.

== Participants ==
All players are Grandmasters unless indicated otherwise.

1. Vassily Ivanchuk (UKR), 2787
2. Shakhriyar Mamedyarov (AZE), 2752
3. Teimour Radjabov (AZE), 2742
4. Levon Aronian (ARM), 2741
5. Alexei Shirov (ESP), 2739
6. Peter Svidler (RUS), 2732
7. Michael Adams (ENG), 2729
8. Evgeny Alekseev (RUS), 2716
9. Alexander Grischuk (RUS), 2715
10. Magnus Carlsen (NOR), 2714
11. Gata Kamsky (USA), 2714
12. Vladimir Akopian (ARM), 2713
13. Dmitry Jakovenko (RUS), 2710
14. Ruslan Ponomariov (UKR), 2705
15. Wang Yue (CHN), 2703
16. Étienne Bacrot (FRA), 2695
17. Sergey Karjakin (UKR), 2694
18. Bu Xiangzhi (CHN), 2692
19. Pavel Eljanov (UKR), 2691
20. Zoltán Almási (HUN), 2691
21. Vladimir Malakhov (RUS), 2690
22. Rustam Kasimdzhanov (UZB), 2690
23. Leinier Domínguez (CUB), 2683
24. Loek van Wely (NED), 2679
25. Konstantin Landa (RUS), 2678
26. Andrei Volokitin (UKR), 2678
27. Sergei Rublevsky (RUS), 2676
28. Alexander Onischuk (USA), 2674
29. Ernesto Inarkiev (RUS), 2674
30. Vadim Zvjaginsev (RUS), 2674
31. Ivan Cheparinov (BUL), 2670
32. Pentala Harikrishna (IND), 2668
33. Liviu-Dieter Nisipeanu (ROU), 2668
34. Vladislav Tkachiev (FRA), 2661
35. Krishnan Sasikiran (IND), 2661
36. Francisco Vallejo Pons (ESP), 2660
37. Predrag Nikolić (BIH), 2657
38. David Navara (CZE), 2656
39. Emil Sutovsky (ISR), 2655
40. Laurent Fressinet (FRA), 2654
41. Evgeny Bareev (RUS), 2653
42. Nigel Short (ENG), 2649
43. Kiril Georgiev (BUL), 2649
44. Sergey Volkov (RUS), 2648
45. Bartosz Soćko (POL), 2646
46. Evgeny Tomashevsky (RUS), 2646
47. Alexander Motylev (RUS), 2645
48. Zhang Pengxiang (CHN), 2644
49. Michael Roiz (ISR), 2643
50. Sergei Tiviakov (NED), 2643
51. Wang Hao (CHN), 2643
52. Alexander Khalifman (RUS), 2643
53. Zviad Izoria^{1} (GEO), 2643
54. Boris Avrukh (ISR), 2641
55. Arkadij Naiditsch (GER), 2639
56. Evgeniy Najer (RUS), 2635
57. Konstantin Sakaev (RUS), 2634
58. Mikhail Gurevich (TUR), 2627
59. Alexander Shabalov (USA), 2626
60. Yuri Shulman (USA), 2616
61. Maxim Rodshtein (ISR), 2615
62. Viktor Láznička (CZE), 2610
63. Zdenko Kožul (CRO), 2609
64. Mateusz Bartel (POL), 2608
65. Aleksandr Galkin (RUS), 2608
66. Lázaro Bruzón Batista (CUB), 2607
67. Bartłomiej Macieja (POL), 2606
68. Jan Gustafsson (GER), 2606
69. Rafael Leitão (BRA), 2601
70. Dusko Pavasovic (SLO), 2597
71. Gregory S. Kaidanov (USA), 2597
72. Nikita Vitiugov (RUS), 2594
73. Emanuel Berg (SWE), 2593
74. Julio E. Granda Zuniga (PER), 2592
75. Gilberto Milos (BRA), 2592
76. Ehsan Ghaem Maghami (IRI), 2591
77. Vladimir Belov (RUS), 2587
78. Robert Markuš (SRB), 2586
79. Surya Shekhar Ganguly (IND), 2585
80. Varuzhan Akobian (USA), 2584
81. Merab Gagunashvili (GEO), 2584
82. Boris Savchenko (RUS), 2583
83. Rauf Mamedov (AZE), 2582
84. Vladimir Georgiev (MKD), 2576
85. Grzegorz Gajewski (POL), 2573
86. Susanto Megaranto (INA), 2569
87. David Baramidze (GER), 2569
88. Julio Becerra Rivero (USA), 2568
89. Diego Flores (ARG), 2566, IM
90. Zhou Jianchao (CHN), 2565
91. Alexander Ivanov (USA), 2565
92. Artem Iljin (RUS), 2565
93. Sergey Kudrin (USA), 2563
94. Sergei Zhigalko (BLR), 2562
95. Csaba Balogh (HUN), 2561
96. Bassem Amin (EGY), 2561
97. Zhao Jun (CHN), 2552
98. Juan Carlos González Zamora^{1} (MEX), 2552
99. Abhijit Kunte (IND), 2547
100. Fernando Peralta (ARG), 2546
101. Zaven Andriasian (ARM), 2546
102. Imre Hera Jr. (HUN), 2544
103. Lê Quang Liêm (VIE), 2534
104. Vladislav Nevednichy (ROU), 2531
105. Nguyễn Ngọc Trường Sơn (VIE), 2530
106. Alexei Iljushin (RUS), 2528
107. G.N. Gopal (IND), 2520, IM
108. Xu Yuhua (CHN), 2517
109. Wen Yang (CHN), 2515, IM
110. Enamul Hossain (BAN), 2514, IM
111. Nikolai Kabanov (RUS), 2512, IM
112. Everaldo Matsuura (BRA), 2511, IM
113. Darwin Laylo (PHI), 2508, IM
114. Aleksei Pridorozhni (RUS), 2506, IM
115. Essam El Gindy (EGY), 2503, IM
116. Ziaur Rahman (BAN), 2497
117. Anton Filippov (UZB), 2496, IM
118. Ahmed Adly (EGY), 2494
119. Zhao Zong-Yuan (AUS), 2491, IM
120. Darcy Lima (BRA), 2484
121. Anuar Ismagambetov (KAZ), 2480, IM
122. Igor Zugic (CAN), 2477, IM
123. Eduardo Iturrizaga (VEN), 2435, IM
124. Robert Gwaze (ZIM), 2429, IM
125. Juan Pablo Hobaica (ARG), 2427, IM
126. Vladimir Genba (RUS), 2413, IM
127. Khaled Abdel Razik (EGY), 2389, FM
128. Pedro Aderito (ANG), 2352, IM

^{1} Izoria did not appear at the Cup due to visa problems. Gonzalez Zamora did not appear at the Cup due to illness.

== Playing conditions ==
The tournament is in the style of the FIDE World Chess Championships 1998–2004: each round consists of a two-game match (except for the final round, which will be a four-game match), followed by tie breaks at faster time controls if required.

The time control for regular games is 90 minutes for the first 40 moves and 30 minutes for the rest of the game, with 30 seconds added after each move. Tie breaks consist of two rapid chess games (25 minutes each + 10 seconds per move); followed by two blitz games if required (5 minutes + 10 seconds per move); followed by a single Armageddon chess game if required (white has 6 minutes and must win, black has 5 minutes and only needs to draw).

The prize money ranged from US$6,000 for players eliminated in the first round to $80,000 for the losing finalist and $120,000 for the winner.

== Results, rounds 1–4 ==
=== Summary ===
==== Round 1 ====
Most of the top seeds progressed. From the top 32, the only higher seeded players eliminated were Pavel Eljanov (19th seed), Konstantin Landa (25) and Pendyala Harikrishna (32).

==== Round 2 ====
Players in the top 32 eliminated in regular games were Teimour Radjabov (seeded 3), Loek van Wely (24). Top 32 players eliminated in tie breaks were Rustam Kasimdzhanov (22), Andrei Volokitin (26) and Vadim Zvjaginsev (30). This left 24 of the top 32 seeds in the final 32.

High seeds needing tie breaks to progress included Vassily Ivanchuk (1), Magnus Carlsen (10), Ruslan Ponomariov (14) and Wang Yue (15).

==== Round 3 ====
After the two regular games, 10 of the 16 matches had decisive results. Players going through on the regular games are: Alexei Shirov (seeded 5), Michael Adams (7), Evgeny Alekseev (8), Magnus Carlsen (10), Gata Kamsky (11), Vladimir Akopian (12), Dmitry Jakovenko (13), Ruslan Ponomariov (14), Wang Yue (15) and Ivan Cheparinov (31). Cheparinov eliminated the number 2 seed Shakhriyar Mamedyarov.

The other six matches were decided in the tie breaks. Winners were Liviu-Dieter Nisipeanu (33) (eliminating top seed Vassily Ivanchuk), Krishnan Sasikiran (35), Evgeny Bareev (41), Levon Aronian (4), Peter Svidler (6), Sergey Karjakin (17).

==== Round 4 ====
In the regular time control games, Shirov, Ponomariov, Carlsen, Karjakin and Cheparinov won their respective matches against Akopian, Sasikiran, Adams, Nisipeanu and Wang Yue. The other three matches (Jakovenko-Aronian, Svidler-Kamsky and Bareev-Alekseev) proceed to tie breaks, with wins to Jakovenko, Kamsky and Alekseev.

=== Section 1 ===
First round
1 | (Ukraine) Vassily Ivanchuk | 2
128 | (Angola) Pedro Aderito | 0
64 | (Poland) Mateusz Bartel | 1
65 | (Russia) Aleksandr Galkin | 3
32 | (India) Pendyala Harikrishna | 1½
97 | (China) Zhao Jun | 2½
33 | (Romania) Liviu-Dieter Nisipeanu | 1½
96 | (Egypt) Bassem Amin | ½
16 | (France) Étienne Bacrot | 1½
113 | (Philippines) Darwin Laylo | ½
49 | (Israel) Michael Roiz | 4
80 | (United States) Varuzhan Akobian | 3
17 | (Ukraine) Sergey Karjakin | 2
112 | (Brazil) Everaldo Matsuura | 0
48 | (China) Zhang Pengxiang | 2½
81 | (Georgia (country)) Merab Gagunashvili | 1½

Quarter-finals
1 | (Ukraine) Vassily Ivanchuk | 2½
65 | (Russia) Aleksandr Galkin | 1½
97 | (China) Zhao Jun | 1½
33 | (Romania) Liviu-Dieter Nisipeanu | 2½
16 | (France) Étienne Bacrot | 1½
49 | (Israel) Michael Roiz | ½
17 | (Ukraine) Sergey Karjakin | 1½
48 | (China) Zhang Pengxiang | ½

Third round
1 | (Ukraine) Vassily Ivanchuk | 2½
33 | (Romania) Liviu-Dieter Nisipeanu | 3½
16 | (France) Étienne Bacrot | 1
17 | (Ukraine) Sergey Karjakin | 3

Fourth round
33 | (Romania) Liviu-Dieter Nisipeanu | ½
17 | (Ukraine) Sergey Karjakin | 1½

=== Section 2 ===
First round
8 | (Russia) Evgeny Alekseev | 2½
121 | (Kazakhstan) Anuar Ismagambetov | 1½
57 | (Russia) Konstantin Sakaev | 4
72 | (Russia) Nikita Vitiugov | 3
25 | (Russia) Konstantin Landa | ½
104 | (Romania) Vladislav Nevednichy | 1½
40 | (France) Laurent Fressinet | 2
89 | (Argentina) Diego Flores | 0
9 | (Russia) Alexander Grischuk | 1½
120 | (Brazil) Darcy Lima | ½
56 | (Russia) Evgeniy Najer | 1½
73 | (Sweden) Emanuel Berg | ½
24 | (Netherlands) Loek van Wely | 3½
105 | (Vietnam) Nguyễn Ngọc Trường Sơn | 2½
41 | (Russia) Evgeny Bareev | 2
88 | (United States) Julio Becerra Rivero | 0

Quarter-finals
8 | (Russia) Evgeny Alekseev | 1½
57 | (Russia) Konstantin Sakaev | ½
104 | (Romania) Vladislav Nevednichy | ½
40 | (France) Laurent Fressinet | 1½
9 | (Russia) Alexander Grischuk | 1½
56 | (Russia) Evgeniy Najer | ½
24 | (Netherlands) Loek van Wely | ½
41 | (Russia) Evgeny Bareev | 1½

Third round
8 | (Russia) Evgeny Alekseev | 1½
40 | (France) Laurent Fressinet | ½
9 | (Russia) Alexander Grischuk | 1½
41 | (Russia) Evgeny Bareev | 2½

Fourth round
8 | (Russia) Evgeny Alekseev | 3
41 | (Russia) Evgeny Bareev | 1

=== Section 3 ===
First round
4 | (Armenia) Levon Aronian | 2
125 | (Argentina) Juan Pablo Hobaica | 0
61 | (Israel) Maxim Rodshtein | ½
68 | (Germany) Jan Gustafsson | 1½
29 | (Russia) Ernesto Inarkiev | 1½
100 | (Argentina) Fernando Peralta | ½
36 | (Spain) Francisco Vallejo Pons | 1½
93 | (United States) Sergey Kudrin | ½
13 | (Russia) Dmitry Jakovenko | 2
116 | (Bangladesh) Ziaur Rahman | 0
52 | (Russia) Alexander Khalifman | 1½
77 | (Russia) Vladimir Belov | 2½
20 | (Hungary) Zoltán Almási | 1½
109 | (China) Wen Yang | ½
45 | (Poland) Bartosz Soćko | 2
84 | (North Macedonia) Vladimir Georgiev | 0

Quarter-finals
4 | (Armenia) Levon Aronian | 1½
68 | (Germany) Jan Gustafsson | ½
29 | (Russia) Ernesto Inarkiev | 1½
36 | (Spain) Francisco Vallejo Pons | ½
13 | (Russia) Dmitry Jakovenko | 1½
77 | (Russia) Vladimir Belov | ½
20 | (Hungary) Zoltán Almási | 2
45 | (Poland) Bartosz Soćko | 0

Third round
4 | (Armenia) Levon Aronian | 3
29 | (Russia) Ernesto Inarkiev | 1
13 | (Russia) Dmitry Jakovenko | 1½
20 | (Hungary) Zoltán Almási | ½

Fourth round
4 | (Armenia) Levon Aronian | 1½
13 | (Russia) Dmitry Jakovenko | 2½

=== Section 4 ===
First round
5 | (Spain) Alexei Shirov | 2
124 | (Zimbabwe) Robert Gwaze | 0
60 | (United States) Yuri Shulman | 3
69 | (Brazil) Rafael Leitão | 1
28 | (United States) Alexander Onischuk | 2½
101 | (Armenia) Zaven Andriasian | 1½
37 | (Bosnia and Herzegovina) Predrag Nikolić | 2
92 | (Russia) Artem Iljin | 0
12 | (Armenia) Vladimir Akopian | 2½
117 | (Uzbekistan) Anton Filippov | 1½
53 | (Georgia (country)) Zviad Izoria
76 | (Iran) Ehsan Ghaem Maghami | w/o
21 | (Russia) Vladimir Malakhov | 2
108 | (China) Xu Yuhua | 0
44 | (Russia) Sergey Volkov | 1½
85 | (Poland) Grzegorz Gajewski | ½

Quarter-finals
5 | (Spain) Alexei Shirov | 1½
60 | (United States) Yuri Shulman | ½
28 | (United States) Alexander Onischuk | 1½
37 | (Bosnia and Herzegovina) Predrag Nikolić | ½
12 | (Armenia) Vladimir Akopian | 1½
76 | (Iran) Ehsan Ghaem Maghami | ½
21 | (Russia) Vladimir Malakhov | 2½
44 | (Russia) Sergey Volkov | 1½

Third round
5 | (Spain) Alexei Shirov | 1½
28 | (United States) Alexander Onischuk | ½
12 | (Armenia) Vladimir Akopian | 1½
21 | (Russia) Vladimir Malakhov | ½

Fourth round
5 | (Spain) Alexei Shirov | 1½
12 | (Armenia) Vladimir Akopian | ½

=== Section 5 ===
First round
2 | (Azerbaijan) Shakhriyar Mamedyarov | 2
127 | (Egypt) Khaled Abdel Razik | 0
63 | (Croatia) Zdenko Kožul | 3½
66 | (Cuba) Lázaro Bruzón Batista | 2½
31 | (Bulgaria) Ivan Cheparinov | w/o
98 | (Mexico) Juan Carlos González Zamora
34 | (France) Vladislav Tkachiev | 1½
95 | (Hungary) Csaba Balogh | ½
15 | (China) Wang Yue | 1½
114 | (Russia) Aleksei Pridorozhni | ½
50 | (Netherlands) Sergei Tiviakov | 1½
79 | (India) Surya Shekhar Ganguly | ½
18 | (China) Bu Xiangzhi | 2
111 | (Russia) Nikolai Kabanov | 0
47 | (Russia) Alexander Motylev | 1½
82 | (Russia) Boris Savchenko | ½

Quarter-finals
2 | (Azerbaijan) Shakhriyar Mamedyarov | 1½
63 | (Croatia) Zdenko Kožul | ½
31 | (Bulgaria) Ivan Cheparinov | 3½
34 | (France) Vladislav Tkachiev | 2½
15 | (China) Wang Yue | 2½
50 | (Netherlands) Sergei Tiviakov | 1½
18 | (China) Bu Xiangzhi | 3½
47 | (Russia) Alexander Motylev | 2½

Third round
2 | (Azerbaijan) Shakhriyar Mamedyarov | ½
31 | (Bulgaria) Ivan Cheparinov | 1½
15 | (China) Wang Yue | 1½
18 | (China) Bu Xiangzhi | ½

Fourth round
31 | (Bulgaria) Ivan Cheparinov | 1½
15 | (China) Wang Yue | ½

=== Section 6 ===
First round
7 | (England) Michael Adams | 1½
122 | (Canada) Igor Zugic | ½
58 | (Turkey) Mikhail Gurevich | 2½
71 | (United States) Gregory S. Kaidanov | 1½
26 | (Ukraine) Andrei Volokitin | 1½
103 | (Vietnam) Lê Quang Liêm | ½
39 | (Israel) Emil Sutovsky | ½
90 | (China) Zhou Jianchao | 1½
10 | (Norway) Magnus Carlsen | 2
119 | (Australia) Zhao Zong-Yuan | 0
55 | (Germany) Arkadij Naiditsch | 1½
74 | (Peru) Julio E. Granda Zuniga | ½
23 | (Cuba) Leinier Domínguez | 2
106 | (Russia) Alexei Iljushin | 0
42 | (England) Nigel Short | 1½
87 | (Germany) David Baramidze | 2½

Quarter-finals
7 | (England) Michael Adams | 1½
58 | (Turkey) Mikhail Gurevich | ½
26 | (Ukraine) Andrei Volokitin | 3
90 | (China) Zhou Jianchao | 4
10 | (Norway) Magnus Carlsen | 3
55 | (Germany) Arkadij Naiditsch | 1
23 | (Cuba) Leinier Domínguez | 1½
87 | (Germany) David Baramidze | ½

Third round
7 | (England) Michael Adams | 1½
90 | (China) Zhou Jianchao | ½
10 | (Norway) Magnus Carlsen | 1½
23 | (Cuba) Leinier Domínguez | ½

Fourth round
7 | (England) Michael Adams | ½
10 | (Norway) Magnus Carlsen | 1½

=== Section 7 ===
First round
3 | (Azerbaijan) Teimour Radjabov | 2
126 | (Russia) Vladimir Genba | 0
62 | (Czech Republic) Viktor Láznička | ½
67 | (Poland) Bartłomiej Macieja | 1½
30 | (Russia) Vadim Zvjaginsev | 2½
99 | (India) Abhijit Kunte | 1½
35 | (India) Krishnan Sasikiran | 3½
94 | (Belarus) Sergei Zhigalko | 2½
14 | (Ukraine) Ruslan Ponomariov | 2½
115 | (Egypt) Essam El Gindy | 1½
51 | (China) Wang Hao | 1½
78 | (Serbia) Robert Markuš | ½
19 | (Ukraine) Pavel Eljanov | ½
110 | (Bangladesh) Enamul Hossain | 1½
46 | (Russia) Evgeny Tomashevsky | 3½
83 | (Azerbaijan) Rauf Mamedov | 2½

Quarter-finals
3 | (Azerbaijan) Teimour Radjabov | 0
67 | (Poland) Bartłomiej Macieja | 2
30 | (Russia) Vadim Zvjaginsev | 2
35 | (India) Krishnan Sasikiran | 4
14 | (Ukraine) Ruslan Ponomariov | 2½
51 | (China) Wang Hao | 1½
110 | (Bangladesh) Enamul Hossain | ½
46 | (Russia) Evgeny Tomashevsky | 1½

Third round
67 | (Poland) Bartłomiej Macieja | 2
35 | (India) Krishnan Sasikiran | 4
14 | (Ukraine) Ruslan Ponomariov | 1½
46 | (Russia) Evgeny Tomashevsky | ½

Fourth round
35 | (India) Krishnan Sasikiran | ½
14 | (Ukraine) Ruslan Ponomariov | 1½

=== Section 8 ===
First round
6 | (Russia) Peter Svidler | 2
123 | (Venezuela) Eduardo Iturrizaga | 0
59 | (United States) Alexander Shabalov | ½
70 | (Slovenia) Dusko Pavasovic | 1½
27 | (Russia) Sergei Rublevsky | 1½
102 | (Hungary) Imre Hera Jr. | ½
38 | (Czech Republic) David Navara | 1½
91 | (United States) Alexander Ivanov | ½
11 | (United States) Gata Kamsky | 1½
118 | (Egypt) Ahmed Adly | ½
54 | (Israel) Boris Avrukh | 3
75 | (Brazil) Gilberto Milos | 1
22 | (Uzbekistan) Rustam Kasimdzhanov | 4
107 | (India) G.N. Gopal | 2
43 | (Bulgaria) Kiril Georgiev | 2
86 | (Indonesia) Susanto Megaranto | 0

Quarter-finals
6 | (Russia) Peter Svidler | 2
70 | (Slovenia) Dusko Pavasovic | 0
27 | (Russia) Sergei Rublevsky | 3½
38 | (Czech Republic) David Navara | 2½
11 | (United States) Gata Kamsky | 1½
54 | (Israel) Boris Avrukh | ½
22 | (Uzbekistan) Rustam Kasimdzhanov | 3
43 | (Bulgaria) Kiril Georgiev | 4

Third round
6 | (Russia) Peter Svidler | 2½
27 | (Russia) Sergei Rublevsky | 1½
11 | (United States) Gata Kamsky | 1½
43 | (Bulgaria) Kiril Georgiev | ½

Fourth round
6 | (Russia) Peter Svidler | 1½
11 | (United States) Gata Kamsky | 2½

== Results, rounds 5–7 ==
Quarterfinals
17 | (Ukraine) Sergey Karjakin | 2½
8 | (Russia) Evgeny Alekseev | 1½
13 | (Russia) Dmitry Jakovenko | 0
5 | (Spain) Alexei Shirov | 2
31 | (Bulgaria) Ivan Cheparinov | ½
10 | (Norway) Magnus Carlsen | 1½
14 | (Ukraine) Ruslan Ponomariov | ½
11 | (United States) Gata Kamsky | 1½

Semifinals
17 | (Ukraine) Sergey Karjakin | 1½
5 | (Spain) Alexei Shirov | 2½
10 | (Norway) Magnus Carlsen | ½
11 | (United States) Gata Kamsky | 1½

Final (best of 4)
5 | (Spain) Alexei Shirov | 1½
11 | (United States) Gata Kamsky | 2½

Chessbase reports: Round five Game one; Round five Game two; Round five tie breaks; Round six Game one.

== Final stats ==
13 December – 16 December

| Seed | Name | Rating | 1 | 2 | 3 | 4 | Total |
|---|---|---|---|---|---|---|---|
| 5 | Alexei Shirov (ESP) | 2739 | ½ | 0 | ½ | ½ | 1½ |
| 11 | Gata Kamsky (USA) | 2714 | ½ | 1 | ½ | ½ | 2½ |
