= Zhou Jianchao =

Chinese-American chess grandmaster (born 1988)

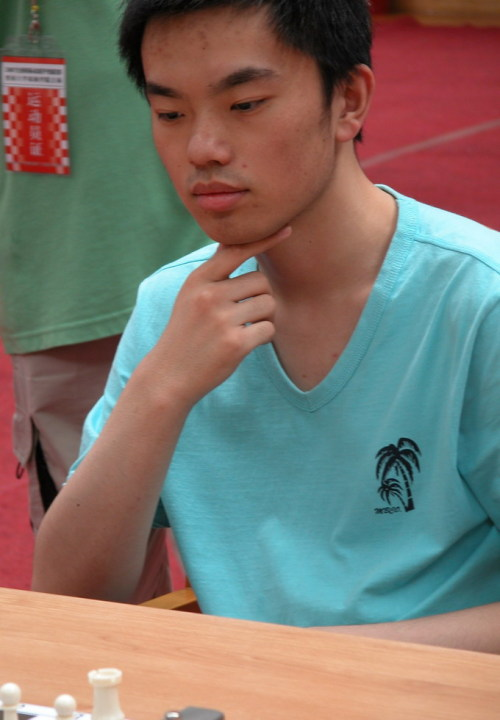
- Zhou in 2007

Personal information
- Born: June 11, 1988 (age 38) Shanghai, China

Chess career
- Country: China (until 2024); United States (since 2024)
- Title: Grandmaster (2006)
- FIDE rating: 2605 (July 2026)
- Peak rating: 2669 (November 2010)
- Peak ranking: No. 67 (July 2010)

Zhou Jianchao (Chinese: 周健超; born June 11, 1988) is a Chinese-American chess player. In 2006, he became China's 21st Grandmaster at the age of 17. Zhou competed in the FIDE World Cup in 2007, 2009 and 2015.

== Career ==
Zhou learned to play chess at the age of 6. He achieved the norms required for the Grandmaster title at the 2005 Aeroflot Open (A2 Group), the 2005 Dubai Open and the 2006 Aeroflot Open (A2 Group).

In 2005, Zhou was the runner-up of the Chinese Chess Championship and part of the silver-winning Chinese team at the World Team Chess Championship. In 2007, Zhou reached round three at the Chess World Cup 2007, where he eventually lost to Michael Adams. Zhou knocked out Emil Sutovsky and Andrei Volokitin in the first two rounds.

In 2008, he was part of the gold-winning Chinese team at the Asian Team Chess Championship, winning board gold on the reserve board. In April 2009, Zhou became a top 100 player for the first time in his career. At the 2009 Aeroflot Open, Zhou came third on tiebreak scoring 6/9 (+3,=6,-0) with a 2753 performance. Also in 2009, Zhou reached the second round of the Chess World Cup 2009, where he was knocked out by Vugar Gashimov. He defeated Rauf Mamedov in the first round.

Zhou scored 6/9 points (+3,=6,-0) at the 2010 Aeroflot Open, coming 6th out of 80 players with a 2777 performance. In 2011 he came third in the Lake Sevan tournament in Martuni, Armenia and won the 1st Chinese Rapid Championship in Hefei. In 2015, Zhou was knocked out in the first round of the Chess World Cup 2015 by Dmitry Andreikin. In 2022 he won the Mission 360 GM/IM Norm #1 tournament in San Jose, California.

In team events, Zhou played for China in the 2nd Russia-China Match in 2004, the World Youth U16 Chess Olympiad in 2004 (winning board gold on board 2), the World Team Chess Championship in 2005, the Asian Team Chess Championship in 2008, 2016 and 2018, and the 39th Chess Olympiad held in 2010. Zhou played for the Shanghai chess club in the China Chess League.

In 2019, Zhou moved from China to Medford, Massachusetts. He switched his national federation to the United States in 2024. He won the USCF Grand Prix in 2023, 2024, and 2025.

From May 2025 to February 2026, Zhou achieved the longest unbeaten streak in FIDE-rated classical chess, playing 158 consecutive games across 26 tournaments without a loss. His streak surpassed the previous record, set by GM Bogdan Lalic in 2010–11, by three games. During the run, he faced opposition with an average rating of 2298, scoring 106 wins and 52 draws (132/158). His streak included 26 games against grandmasters, of which he won 10. The streak was finally broken by a defeat to GM Francesco Sonis.

On May 31 and June 1 2025, Zhou competed in the strongest chess tournament in Nebraska history, an event commemorating of the 50th anniversary of the 1975 U.S. Open. Four grandmasters were present at the anniversary event, including Manuel Petrosyan, Karen Grigoryan, Vojtech Plat, and Zhou.

In May 2026, Zhou competed in the 2026 Wyoming Community Foundation Open in Sheridan, Wyoming, hosted by the Sheridan Chess Association. Ultimately, Zhou tied for first place with GM Bryan Smith and NM Griffin McConnell.
