= Tomáš Kraus (chess player) =

Czech chess grandmaster (born 1995)

Personal information
- Born: 30 August 1995 (age 30) Lázně Bělohrad, Czech Republic

Chess career
- Country: Czech Republic
- Title: Grandmaster (2024)
- FIDE rating: 2409 (July 2026)
- Peak rating: 2501 (March 2024)

Tomáš Kraus (born 30 August 1995) is a Czech chess grandmaster.

== Career ==
In May 2023, he finished in second place in the Czech Chess Championship, after defeating grandmaster Vojtěch Plát in the final round.

He was awarded the Grandmaster title in 2024, after achieving his norms at the:

- Czech Chess Championship in May 2023
- Extraliga 2023/2024 in October 2023
- 38th Voivoda Cup in June 2024
