= Baramidze =

Baramidze or in German transcriptions also as Baramidse (Georgian: ბარამიძე, Russian: Барамидзе) is a Georgian family name which – apart from the cities of Tbilisi and Batumi – is most frequently to be found in the southwestern Guria and Adjara regions of Georgia. Most Baramidzes live in the Tbilisi (846), Batumi (525), Ozurgeti (312), Lanchkhuti (219) and Chokhatauri (209) districts.

== Notable members ==
- David Baramidze (born 1988), German chess Grandmaster of Georgian descent
- Giorgi Baramidze (born 1968), Georgian politician
