= Vladimir Georgiev =

Vladimir Georgiev may refer to:

- Vladimir I. Georgiev (1908–1986), Bulgarian linguist, philologist, and educational administrator
- Vladimir Georgiev (chess player) (born 1975), Bulgarian chess player
