= Alexander Moskalenko (chess player) =

Russian chess grandmaster (born 1988)

Personal information
- Born: June 8, 1988 (age 38) Zhytomyr, Ukrainian SSR, Soviet Union

Chess career
- Country: Russia
- Title: Grandmaster (2018)
- FIDE rating: 2407 (November 2026)
- Peak rating: 2558 (May 2018)

Alexander Viktorovich Moskalenko is a Russian chess grandmaster.

== Chess career ==
In September 2016, he won the 34th Titled Tuesday tournament on chess.com.

He achieved the Grandmaster title in 2018, after earning his norms at the:

- Moscow Open A in February 2016
- Aeroflot Open A in March 2017
- Aeroflot Open B in February 2018

In October 2018, he finished in second place in the week's Titled Tuesday tournament behind Boris Savchenko.

In June 2021, he finished in third place in the week's Titled Tuesday tournament behind Nodirbek Abdusattorov and Hikaru Nakamura.
