= Volodymyr Grabinsky =

Ukrainian chess player (born 1974)

Vladimir Grabinsky
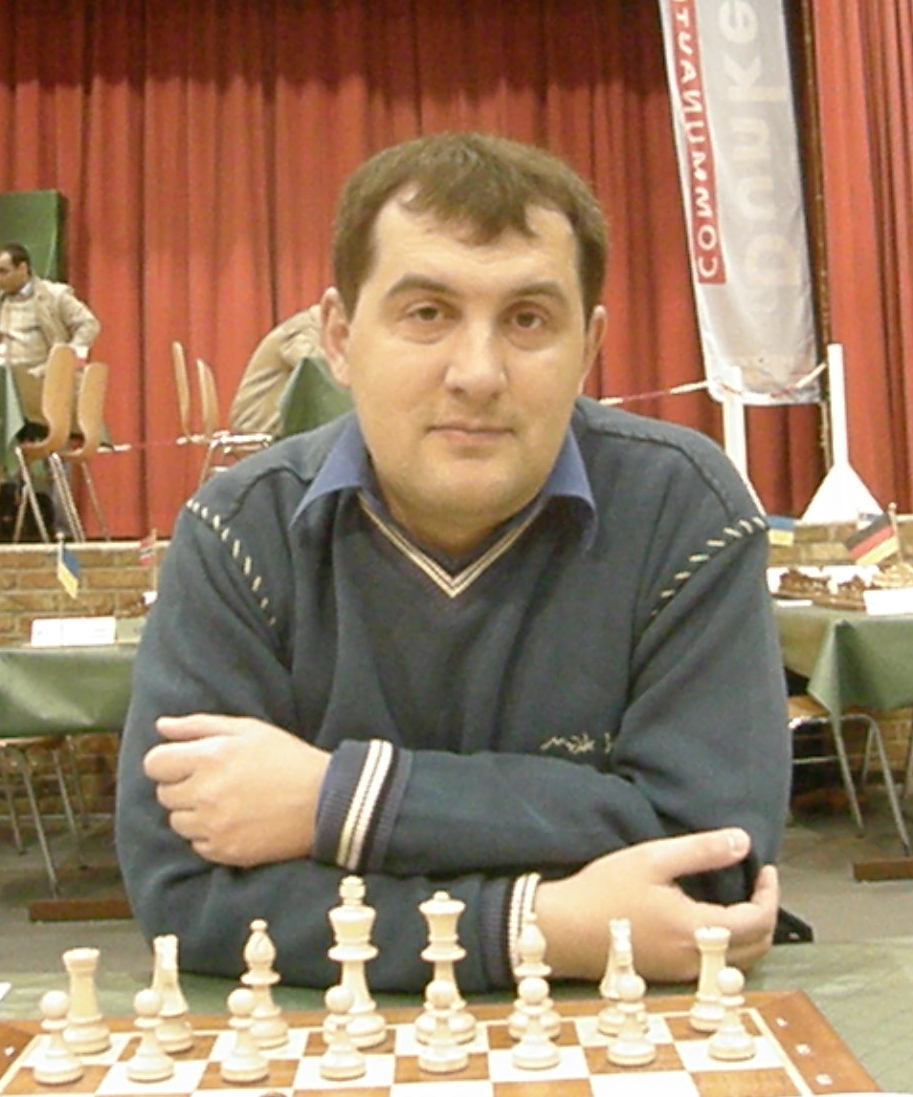

Personal information
- Born: January 15, 1974 (age 52) Lviv, Ukrainian SSR, Soviet Union

Chess career
- Country: Ukraine
- Title: International Master (2003)
- Peak rating: 2407 (July 2003)

Vladimir Alexandrovich Grabinsky (Ukrainian: Володимир Грабінський, romanized: Volodymyr Hrabinskyi; born 15 January 1974) is a Ukrainian chess International Master and coach of the Ukrainian youth team. Enrolled in the Lviv Institute of Physical Culture in 1990 and graduated in 1994. Twelve of his students became Grandmasters at an early age; these are: Andrei Volokitin, Yuriy Kryvoruchko, Martyn Kravtsiv, Yaroslav Zherebukh, Yuri Vovk, Andrey Vovk, Mikhailo Oleksienko, Nataliya Buksa, Vita Kryvoruchko, Myroslava Hrabinska and Kateryna Matseyko.

In 2009 Grabinsky was awarded the title of FIDE Senior Trainer.

== Assessment and personality ==
In his book For Friends & Colleagues Volume II: Reflections on My Profession, Mark Dvoretsky described "There is an excellent trainer Vladimir Grabinsky in Lvov, who has brought up a number of leading Ukrainian young players. Some of them are grandmasters now, the most well-known being Andrey Volokitin. Grabinsky’s approach to chess is not dissimilar to my own. We had a nice talk discussing various training problems. In most cases, our opinions were the same, though we had our differences too. I felt from the very start that I was talking to a professional of the highest level."

In book Dynamic Decision Making in Chess Boris Gelfand described "Grabinsky is a world-class trainer who has worked with close to ten players from their early years until 2650 level."

== Books ==
- Andrei Volokitin, Vladimir Grabinsky, Perfect Your Chess (Gambit, 2007) ISBN 1-904600-82-4
- Władimir Grabinski, Andriej Wołokitin, Laboratorium Arcymistrza (Penelopa, 2007) ISBN 83-86407-71-9
- Andrei Volokitin, Vladimir Grabinsky, Allenamento intensivo di livello superiore (Prisma Editori, 2008) ISBN 978-88-7264-112-5
- Andrej Wolokitin, Wladimir Grabinski, PERFEKTIONIEREN SIE IHR SCHACH (Gambit, 2008)

== Notable games ==
- Vladimir Grabinsky vs Alexander Potapov, Czech Open 2005, Scotch Game: Gцring Gambit (C44), 1–0
