= Manuel Petrosyan =

Armenian chess grandmaster (born 1998)

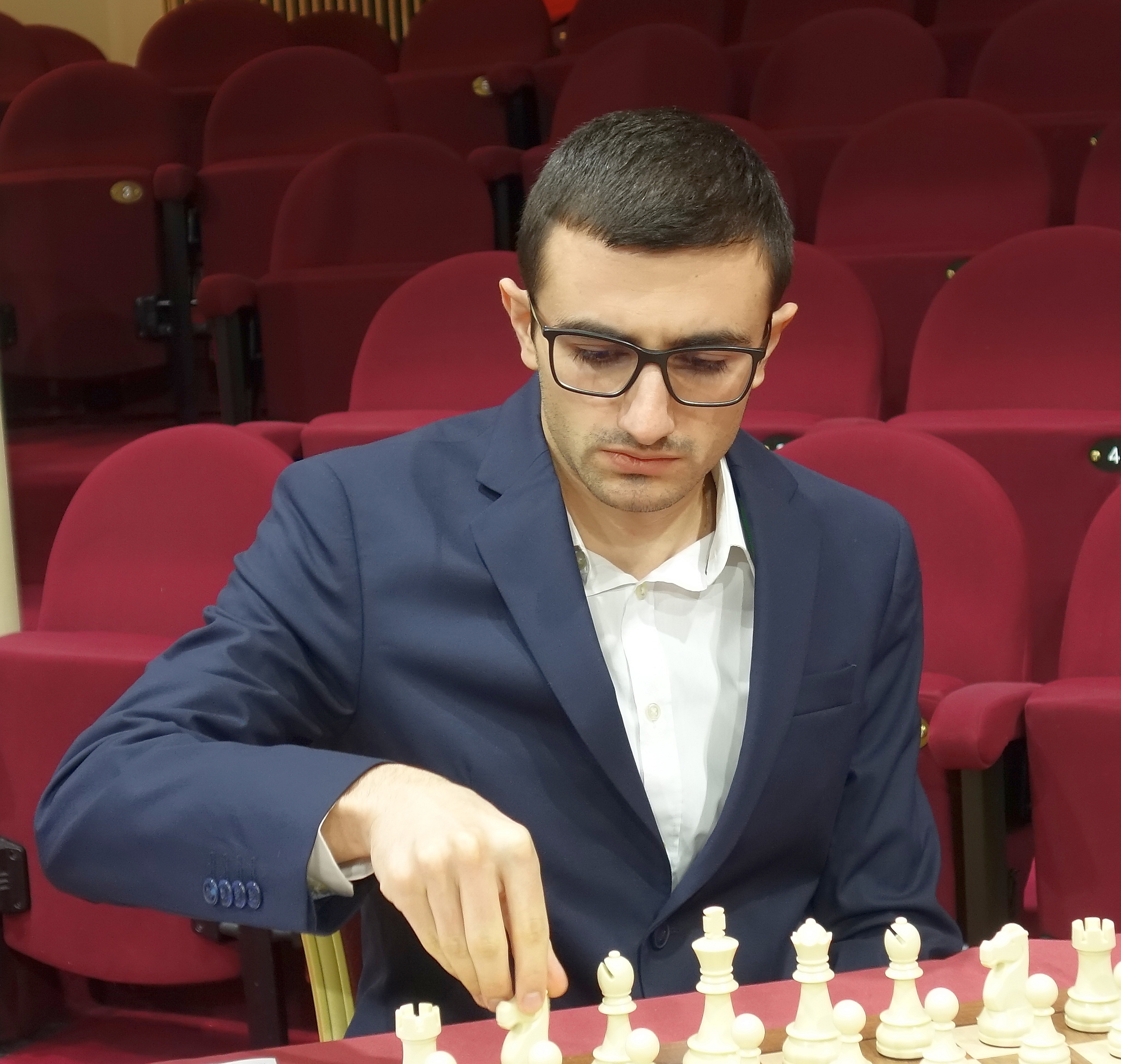
- Manuel Petrosyan at the FIDE Grand Swiss 2023

Personal information
- Born: May 6, 1998 (age 28)

Chess career
- Country: Armenia
- Title: Grandmaster (2017)
- FIDE rating: 2574 (July 2026)
- Peak rating: 2638 (May 2022)

Manuel Sureni Petrosyan (Armenian: Մանուէլ Սուրենի Պետրոսյան; born May 6, 1998) is an Armenian chess player who holds the title of Grandmaster. He won the Armenian Chess Championship in 2022 and 2026.

He won the Under-18 World Youth Chess Championship in 2016 and finished second in the World Junior Chess Championship of 2017.

In August 2018, he finished second in the Riga Technical University Open "A" tournament.

He won the Stepan Avagyan Memorial in both 2020 and 2021.

On May 31 and June 1 2025, Petrosyan competed in the strongest chess tournament in Nebraska history, an event commemorating of the 50th anniversary of the 1975 U.S. Open. Four grandmasters were present at the anniversary event, including Zhou Jiangchao, Karen Grigoryan, Vojtech Plat, and Petrosyan.
