= Zhao Jun (chess player) =

Chinese chess grandmaster (born 1986)

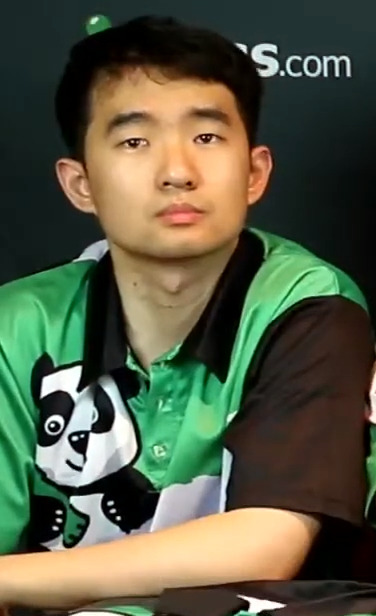
- Zhao in 2019

Personal information
- Born: December 12, 1986 (age 39) Jinan, Shandong, China

Chess career
- Country: China
- Title: Grandmaster (2005)
- FIDE rating: 2538 (July 2026)
- Peak rating: 2641 (September 2019)

Zhao Jun
- Traditional Chinese: 趙駿
- Simplified Chinese: 赵骏
Transcriptions
Standard Mandarin
- Hanyu Pinyin: Zhào Jùn
- Wade–Giles: Chao Chün
- Tongyong Pinyin: Jhào Jyùn
- Yale Romanization: Jàu Jyùn
- IPA: [ʈʂâʊ tɕŷn]
Yue: Cantonese
- Yale Romanization: Ziuh Zeun
- Jyutping: Ziu6 Zeon3
- IPA: [tɕìːu tsɵ̄n]

Zhao Jun (simplified Chinese: 赵骏; traditional Chinese: 趙駿; pinyin: Zhào Jùn; born December 12, 1986) is a Chinese chess player. He was awarded the title Grandmaster (GM) by FIDE in 2005, the 19th from China.

The norms required for the title were achieved in 2004 at the Aeroflot Open, China Men's Team Championship, and World Junior Chess Championship in Cochin, where he came third.

Playing under the handle CK-324, he earned a spot in the 2006 FIDE Blitz Championship by winning a qualifying tournament on the ICC.

Also in 2006, Zhao played for the Chinese national team which won the silver medal in the 37th Chess Olympiad in Turin. He represented China in team events also at the Children's Chess Olympiad in 2000, World Youth U16 Chess Olympiad in 2002, China – France match in 2006, and Asian Team Chess Championship in 2008 and 2012. In the 2008 event, China won the gold medal.

He competed in the FIDE World Cup in 2005, 2007 and 2015. He reached the second round in 2007, when he knocked out Pentala Harikrishna in the first before losing to Liviu-Dieter Nisipeanu.

Zhao won the 90th Hastings International Chess Congress in January 2015 with a score of 8/9, a full point ahead of the closest followers.

Zhao plays for the Shandong chess club in the China Chess League (CCL).
