= Oganes Danielian =

Armenian chess grandmaster (1974–2016)

Oganes Danielian Հովհաննես Դանիելյան
Personal information
- Born: Hovhannes Danielyan; 3 January 1974 Yerevan, Armenian Soviet Socialist Republic, USSR
- Died: 3 August 2016 (aged 42) Moscow, Russia

Chess career
- Country: Armenia
- Title: Grandmaster (1999)
- Peak rating: 2530 (April 2009)

Oganes Danielian (Armenian: Հովհաննես Դանիելյան, romanized: Hovhannes Danielyan; 3 January 1974 – 3 August 2016) was an Armenian chess player. He was awarded the title of Grandmaster by FIDE in 1999.

== Achievements ==
- 1992: Second in the World Youth Chess Championship Under 18 at Duisburg
- 1992: Fourth in the World Junior Chess Championship at Buenos Aires
- 1993: Second at Hallsberg Open
- 1993: Won a match against GM Éloi Relange at Cannes with 3½-2½
- 1994: Fourth at Cappelle-la-Grande Open
- 1998: Won the Goldberg Memorial at Moscow, ahead of Evgeniy Najer and Mihail Saltaev
- 2008: Third place with Andrey Vovk and Evgeni Vasiukov in the Transkarpathian Cup at Mukachevo
