= Karen H. Grigoryan =

Armenian chess grandmaster (born 1995)

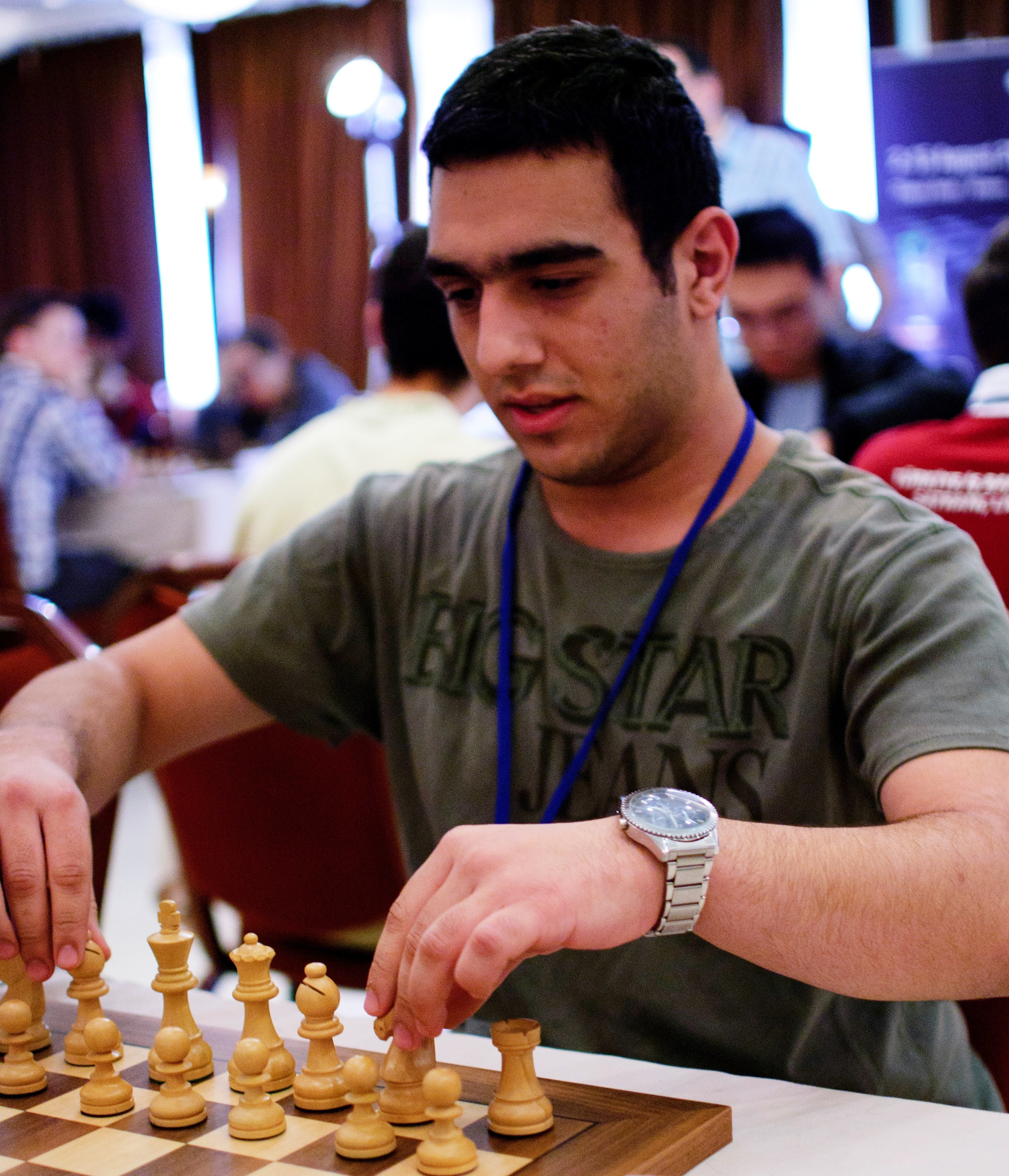

Personal information
- Born: 25 February 1995 (age 31) Yerevan, Armenia

Chess career
- Country: Armenia
- Title: Grandmaster (2013)
- FIDE rating: 2464 (July 2026)
- Peak rating: 2666 (January 2021)
- Peak ranking: No. 71 (April 2020)

Karen Hakob Grigoryan (Armenian: Կարեն Հակոբի Գրիգորյան; born 25 February 1995) is an Armenian chess Grandmaster. He holds the record for the highest performance rating in a classical chess tournament, a rating of 3103 which he achieved with a 9/9 score at the 2019 Cidade de Famalicão.

== Chess career ==
He was awarded the Grandmaster title in May 2013 during the Presidential Board Meeting in Baku. He was the Armenian U14 Champion (2008); European U16 Champion (2010), the winner of the G. Kasparyan Memorial – Young Masters 2010, the 2011 Youth Stars Tournament; the Armenian Chess Championship 2011, the Albena Open (2012), the Open Internacional Escacs Vila de Sitges in July 2013, the 2nd Yerevan Open (2017), the 9th Penang Open (2017), the Jolimark (HK) International Open Chess Championship (2017). In 2019, he won the 26th Elgoibar GM with a score of 7/9 points.

In June 2019, Grigoryan tied for first place with IM Aleksandr Ostrovskiy in the Charlotte Chess Center's Summer 2019 GM Norm Invitational held in Charlotte, North Carolina with a score of 6.0/9.

In 2021, Grigoryan won the 46th Seville Open after tying for first place with Salvador Del Rio De Angelis with a score of 5.5/7, and winning the tiebreaks.

He is the ninth highest-rated active Armenian player as of April 2025.

On May 31 and June 1 2025, Grigoryan competed in the strongest chess tournament in Nebraska history, an event commemorating of the 50th anniversary of the 1975 U.S. Open. Four grandmasters were present at the anniversary event, including Manuel Petrosyan, Zhou Jiangchao, Vojtech Plat, and Grigoryan.
