= Konstantin Landa =

Russian chess grandmaster (1972–2022)

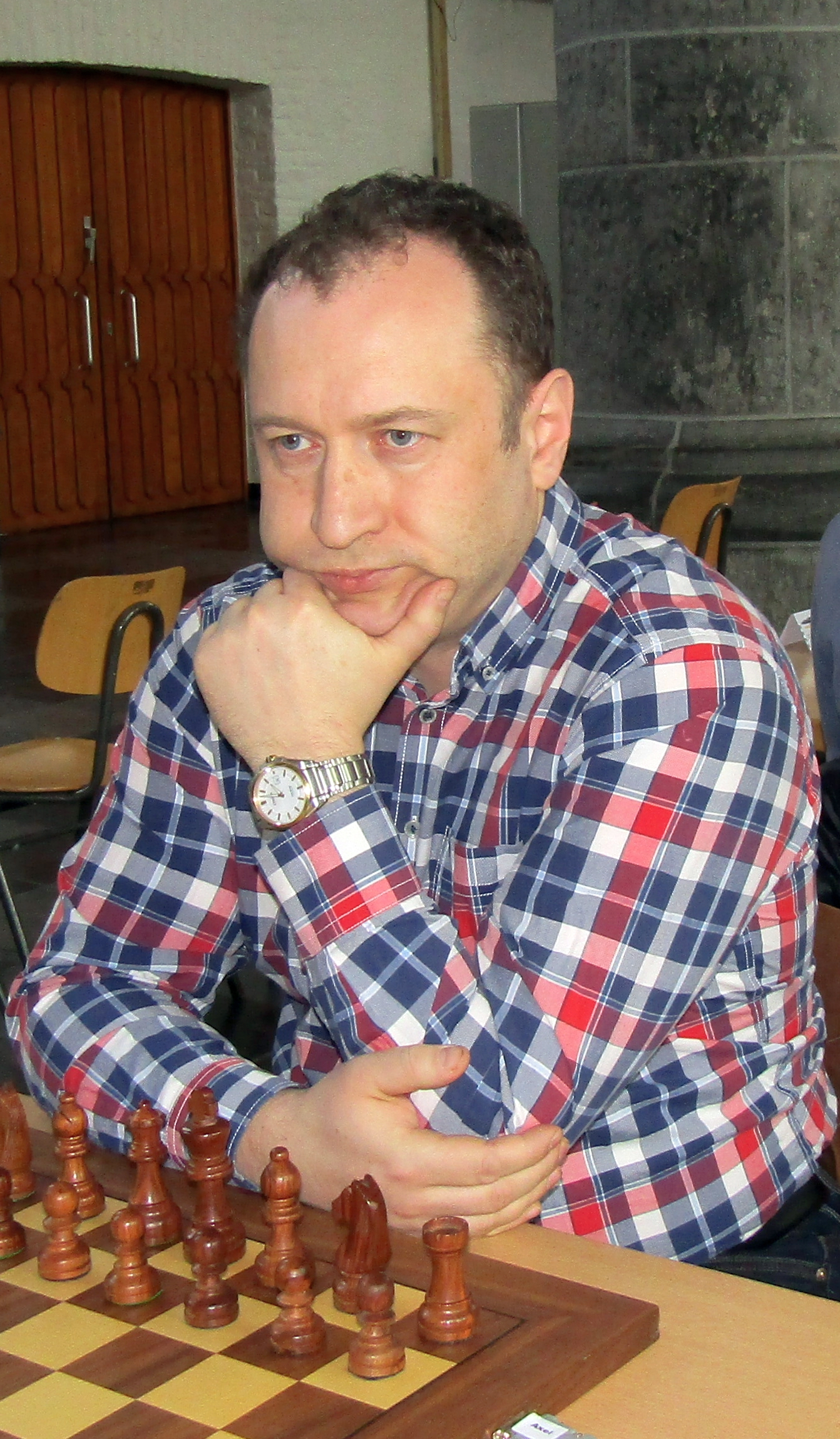
- Landa in 2017

Personal information
- Born: 22 May 1972 Omsk, Russian SFSR, USSR
- Died: October 2022 (aged 50)

Chess career
- Country: Russia
- Title: Grandmaster (1995)
- Peak rating: 2678 (October 2007)
- Peak ranking: No. 32 (October 2007)

Konstantin Landa (Russian: Константин Ланда; 22 May 1972 – October 2022) was a Russian chess grandmaster. He competed in the FIDE World Chess Championship 2004 and FIDE World Cup 2007. In 2011 he was awarded the title of FIDE Senior Trainer.

Landa's best tournament results include: shared first place with Zahar Efimenko at Fürth 2002, first at Trieste 2005, first at Reggio Emilia 2005/2006, first at HZ Tournament 2011. In the European Club Cup, Landa played for gold medal-winning team Ladya Azov in 1997.

Landa died in October 2022, at the age of 50.
