= Chess in Utah =

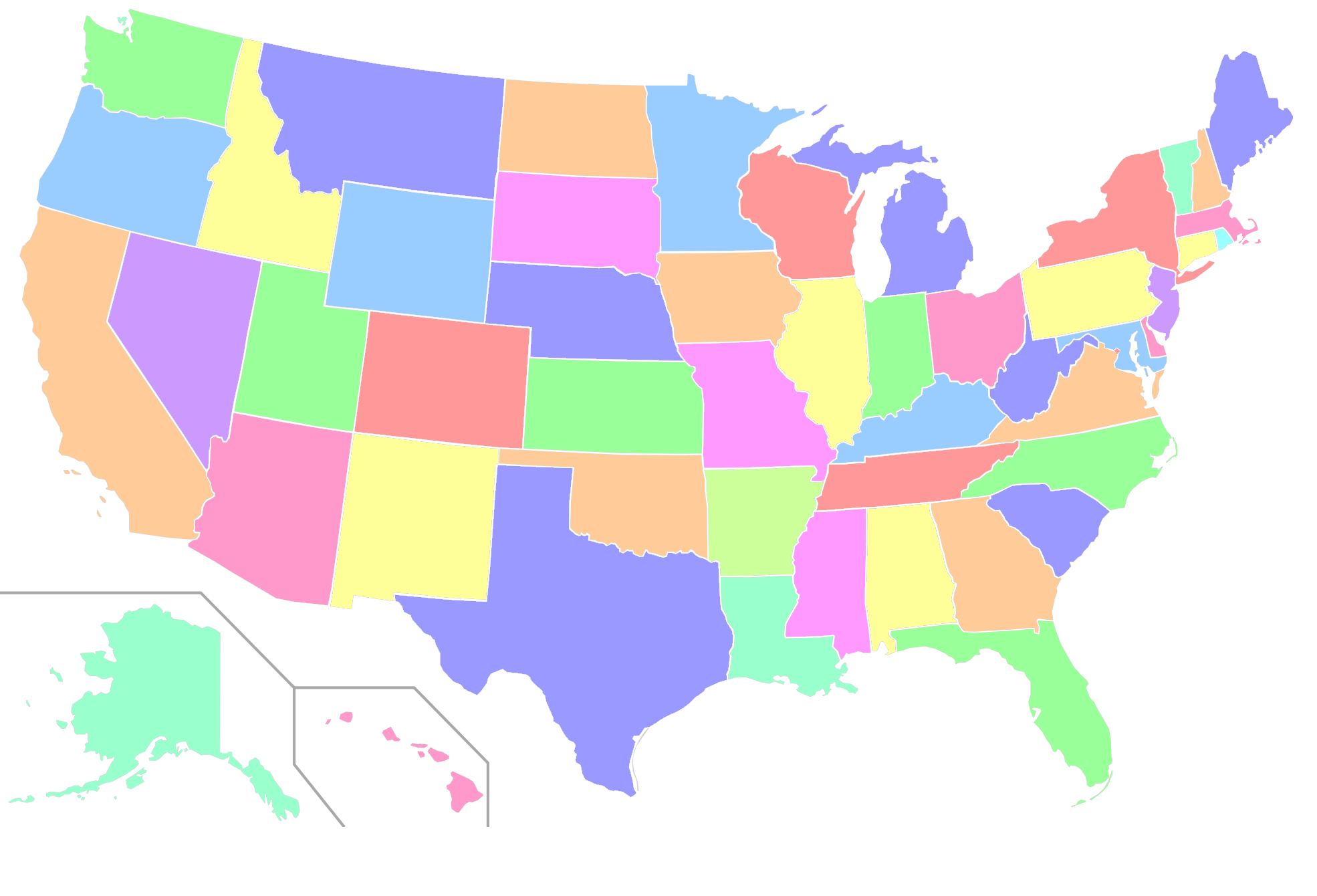
- Top Player: David Forthoffer
- Champion: Bryan Leano
- USCF Affiliate: Utah Chess Association
- Active Players: 642

Chess in Utah refers to competitive chess played within the state of Utah. As of January 2025, Utah has 646 active players registered with the United States Chess Federation. The current USCF Utah state affiliate is the Utah Chess Association.

== History ==
In December 2004, Varuzhan Akobian was invited to play and teach chess to schoolchildren at the McGillis School in Salt Lake City. The Mountain West Chess Association paid for his visit. Gregory Kaidanov was also invited to the same school the following month.

In 2005, Brigham Young University alumni Erik Allebest and Jay Severson launched Chess.com in the hopes that it would become the largest chess platform on the internet.

In 2009, 10 year-old Kayden Troff won the Utah Blitz Championship. He was the youngest player in Utah's Game/60 Chess Championship that year. In March, Troff had a 2125 USCF rapid rating, the highest of every active Utah chess player at the time. Troff was expected to reach the highest rapid chess rating for kids under 13 in the nation during that April's USCF rating supplement. Later, Troff would be sponsored by Garry Kasparov and receive coaching from Alexander Chernin. Eventually, he would eventually earn the Grandmaster title at the Saint Louis Invitational in May 2014.

One Utah school that heavily promotes the game is Ecker Hill Middle School. One player from the school, Sam Mason, won the Utah State Junior High Chess Championship in 2013 without any defeats. In 2019, Ecker Hill expanded its annual K-9 chess tournament to all ages with a "friends and family" section.

During the COVID-19 pandemic, online chess grew in popularity with Utah children. As the pandemic restrictions lifted, they would continue to play the game in classrooms. In response, some Utah school districts banned Chess.com. The Iron County School District was one such school district, blocking access to "non-educational" games. Regarding students playing chess, the school district's communications and foundation coordinator stated, “Chess.com would be one of many classified as games that are blocked to ensure students focus and are learning during the school day."

In December 2024, the city of Murray hosted the second U.S. Senior Women's Championship. The tournament had an $8,000 prize fund. There were 12 participants: WGM Anjelina Belakovskaia, WIM Beatriz Marinello, WFM Natalya Tsodikova, WFM Olga Sagalchik, WIM Alexey Root, WIM Shernaz Kennedy, WCM Natasha C Christiansen, Julia O’Neill, Carla Naylor, WCM Mary K Kuhner, Brenda Nardi, and Jayashree Sekar. The tournament sought the participation from women aged 50 or older.

== Competitors ==
As of March 2026, the following people are the top rated active USCF players from Utah

Position	Name	USCF Rating	USCF Titles
1	David Forthoffer	2232	National Master
2	Bryan B Leano	2157	National Master, Candidate Master (norms-based)
3	Anil Cengiz	2116	None
4	Shreyan Sarangi	2079	1st Category
5	Ujan Ray	2075	1st Category
6	Tihn Son Nguyen	2056	Candidate Master (norms-based)
7	Michael Qin Lu	2036	1st Category
8	Kingsley Koon	2012	1st Category
9	Tyler McIntosh	2008	1st Category
10	Sharif Usenov	2007	1st Category

Other top Utah chess players who aren't currently active USCF members include IM Zhe Quan (2503 Rating), Mark Rubery (2387 Rating), and Sergey Akhpatelov (2355 Rating).

== List of state champions (1991 - 2024) ==
The Utah Chess Association has kept a record of every Utah state champion from 1991 onward.

№	Year	Winner(s)	Notes
1	1991	Igor Ivanov	
2	1992	Igor Ivanov (2)	
3	1993	Mark Rubery	
4	1994	Zillur Rahman	
5	1995	Doug Taffinder	
6	1996	Igor Ivanov (3)	
7	1997	Tegshsuren Enkhbat	
8	1998	Laszlo Bekefi and Jeff Phillips	Tie
9	1999	Tegshsuren Enkhbat (2)	
10	2000	Tegshsuren Enkhbat (3)	
11	2001	Igor Ivanov (4)	
12	2002	Laszlo Bekefi (2)	
13	2003	Igor Ivanov (5)	
14	2004	Igor Ivanov (6)	
15	2005	Igor Ivanov (7), JD Smith, and Damir Trtanj	Tie
16	2006	Doug Lee	
17	2007	Randy Zumbrunnen	
18	2008	Vanel Sanchez	
19	2009	Ivan Martynenko and Vinh Tran	Tie
20	2010	Damian Nash	
21	2011	Damian Nash (2) and David Vasquez	Tie
22	2012	Harold Stevens	
23	2013	Enrique Arce-Larreta	
24	2014	Scott Treiman	
25	2015	Eric Hon	
26	2016	Phil Humpherys	
27	2017	Bryan Leano	
28	2018	Bryan Leano (2) and Daniel Palacios	Tie
29	2019	Andrew Duren	
30	2020	Eric Hon (2) and Tinh Nguyen	Tie
31	2021	Michael Lu	
32	2022	Bryan Leano (3)	
33	2023	Anil Cengiz	
34	2024	Michael Lu (2)	

== See also ==
- Chess in Wyoming
- Chess in Nebraska
