= Vladimir Genba =

Russian chess player

Personal information
- Born: August 12, 1976 (age 49)

Chess career
- Country: Russia
- Title: International Master (1997)
- FIDE rating: 2454 (July 2026)
- Peak rating: 2454 (November 2011)

Vladimir Genba (born August 12, 1976) is a Russian chess player. He was awarded the title International Master by FIDE in 1997.

== Career ==
Vladimir Genba represented Russia 4 at the 39th Chess Olympiad in 2010, where he finished on 6 out of 11.

Genba qualified for the Chess World Cup 2007, where he lost to Teimour Radjabov in the first round, and the Chess World Cup 2011, where he was defeated by eventual finalist Alexander Grischuk in the first round.
