= Adam Tukhaev =

Ukrainian chess grandmaster (born 1988)

Personal information
- Born: February 14, 1988 (age 38) Kerch, Ukrainian SSR, Soviet Union

Chess career
- Country: Ukraine
- Title: Grandmaster (2007)
- FIDE rating: 2519 (July 2026)
- Peak rating: 2575 (September 2017)

Adam Ruslanovich Tukhaev is a Ukrainian chess grandmaster.

== Chess career ==
In June 2015, he finished second in the 4th Kadyrov Memorial, half a point behind winner Boris Savchenko.

In January 2017, he took the sole lead with a perfect score after the seventh round of the Chennai International Open.

In March 2017, he won the Stockholm Chess Challenge after having a better tiebreak score than Erik Blomqvist, Ulvi Bajarani, and Nikita Maiorov.

In December 2018, he defeated Magnus Carlsen in the first round of the World Rapid Chess Championship.
