= Chess in Nebraska =

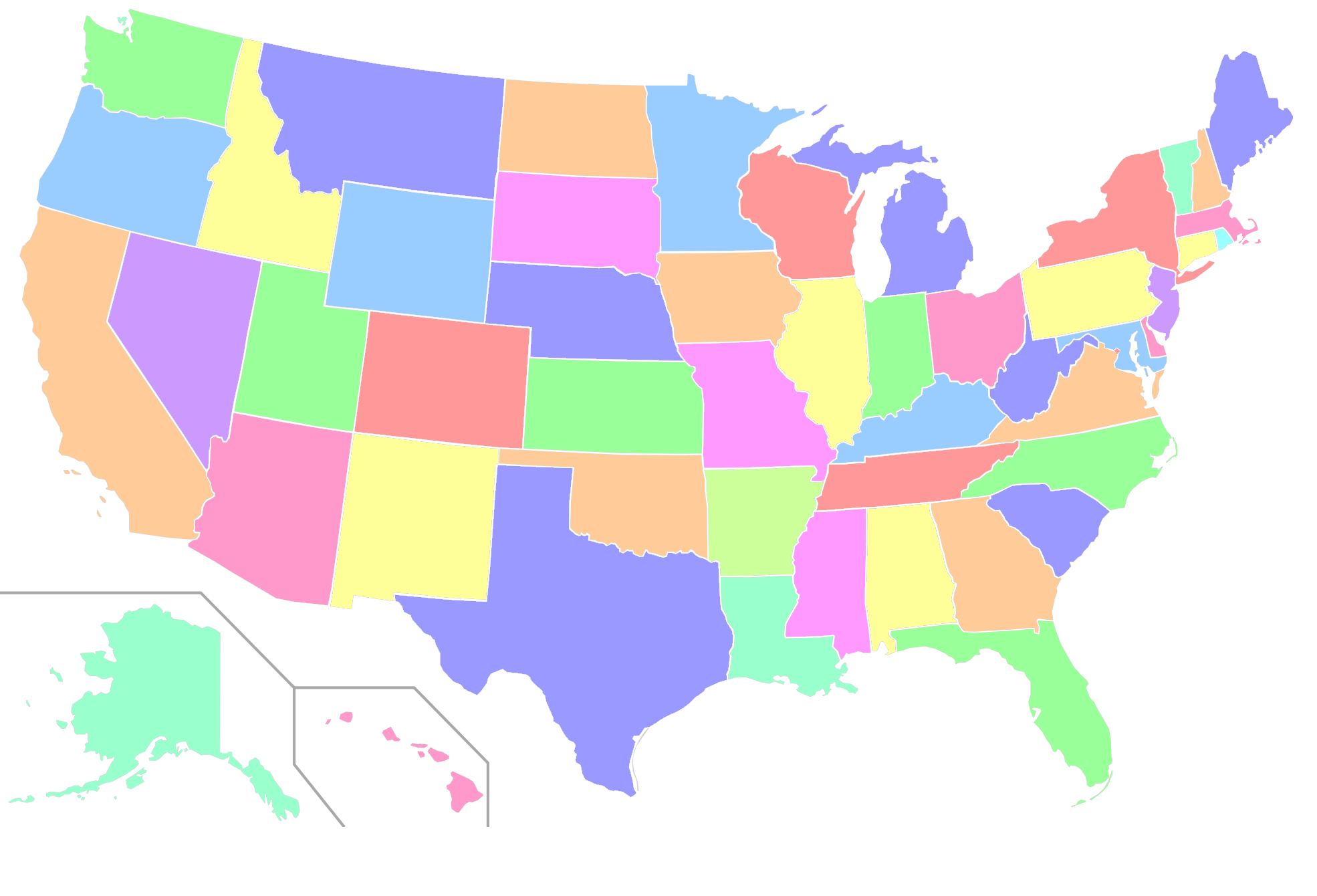
- Top Player: Nathan Solon (2450 USCF)
- Champion: Nicholas LaCroix & Luke Hengen
- USCF Affiliate: Nebraska State Chess Association
- Active Players: 218

Chess in Nebraska refers to competitive chess played within the state of Nebraska. As of May 2026, Nebraska has 218 active players registered with the United States Chess Federation. The current USCF Nebraska state affiliate is the Nebraska State Chess Association.

== History ==
In March 1909, the Nebraska State Journal published a game claimed to have been between José Raúl Capablanca and another player named F. D. Cornell.

Throughout the 1960s and 70's, Nebraska was a hotspot for chess tournaments in the United States. The top chess players from across the nation would travel to the state to compete, including eventual world champion Bobby Fischer. In 1949 and 1959, the U.S. Open Chess Championship was hosted in Omaha. Lincoln hosted the same tournament in 1969 and 1975. Some Nebraskans who began playing around this time would go on to compete globally.

In 1996, the Nebraska Chess Hall of Fame was established. In order for someone to be inducted, they needed to have lived in the state at some point. As of May 2024, 19 people have been inducted into it.

In February 2020, a Bughouse chess tournament was held in Fremont.

In November 2021, the chess club at Plains Baptist Church in Lincoln conducted a simultaneous exhibition featuring JJ Lang. Lang played 16 games at once.

In 2022, the Kearney Chess Club was established. According to one of the club's co-founders, the club caught the attention of a wide age range of players: “We’ve got children as young as 10 that are coming up and playing, we’ve got people in their 50’s that are playing and just all sorts of life experiences.”

In July 2024, the Hastings Tribune published a news story about 14-year-old chess player Thomas Jessop. The article details Jessop's feats such as his victory in the 6-8 division at the Nebraska State Qualifier that May. He was set to compete at the national tournament in Virginia later that month.

The strongest chess tournament in Nebraska history took place from May 31 to June 1, 2025 in honor of the 50th anniversary of the 1975 U.S. Open. Four grandmasters were present at the anniversary event: Manuel Petrosyan, Jianchao Zhou, Karen Grigoryan, and Vojtech Plat.

== Competitors ==
As of May 2026, the following people are the top rated active USCF players from Nebraska:

Position	Name	USCF Rating	USCF Titles
1	Nathan Solon	2432	National Master, Life Master (norms-based)
2	Rodney A Malpert	2304	Original Life Master, National Master, Life Master (norms-based)
3	Jonathan J Lang	2158	Candidate Master (norms-based)
4	Luke O Hengen	2149	Candidate Master (norms-based)
5	Nicholas Paul Lacroix	2094	1st Category
6	Gregory Revesz	2091	1st Category
7	Michael E Dreiger	2085	National Master, 1st Category
8	Siddharth Parthasarathy	2012	1st Category
9	Ben Fabrikant	1973	1st Category
10	Rakshith Seetharaman	1962	1st Category

Other top Nebraska chess players who aren't currently active USCF members include NM Ilan Vardi (2341 Rating), NM Paul D Rohwer (2313 Rating), and Kaveh Alagheband (2211 Rating).

== List of state champions (1899 - 2023) ==
The Nebraska State Chess Association has kept a record of every Nebraska state champion from 1899 onward. In the association's records, the first name of every state champion is abbreviated to a single initial until 2020.

Year	Winner(s)	City	Notes
1899	F. M. Biddle	Omaha	
1900	P. J. Barron	Lincoln	
1901	None		No tournament was held this year
1902	None		No tournament was held this year
1903	None		No tournament was held this year
1904	J. L. Clark	Lincoln	
1905	J. L. Clark (2)	Lincoln	
1906	J. L. Clark (3)	Lincoln	
1907	J. H. Mockett	Lincoln	
1908	J. H. Mockett (2)	Lincoln	
1909	J. H. Mockett (3)	Lincoln	
1910	J. H. Mockett (4)	Lincoln	
1911	F. D. Cornell	Beatrice	
1912	W. T. Pinney	?	
1913	C. C. Enberg	?	
1914	P. J. Barron (2)	?	
1915	J. H. Mockett (5)	Lincoln	
1916	J. H. Mockett (6)	Lincoln	
1917	H. E. Ohman	Omaha	
1918	H. E. Ohman (2)	Omaha	
1919	H. E. Ohman (3)	Omaha	
1920	H. E. Ohman (4)	Omaha	
1921	H. E. Ohman (5)	Omaha	
1922	H. E. Ohman (6)	Omaha	
1923	H. E. Ohman (7)	Omaha	
1924	H. E. Ohman (8)	Omaha	
1925	H. E. Ohman (9)	Omaha	
1926	H. E. Ohman (10)	Omaha	
1927	H. E. Ohman (11)	Omaha	
1928	H. E. Ohman (12)	Omaha	
1929	H. E. Ohman (13)	Omaha	
1930	H. E. Ohman (14)	Omaha	
1931	H. E. Ohman (15)	Omaha	
1932	H. E. Ohman (16)	Omaha	
1933	H. E. Ohman (17)	Omaha	
1934	H. E. Ohman (18)	Omaha	
1935	H. E. Ohman (19)	Omaha	
1936	H. E. Ohman (20)	Omaha	
1937	H. E. Ohman (21)	Omaha	
1938	H. E. Ohman (22)	Omaha	
1939	H. E. Ohman (23)	Omaha	
1940	H. E. Ohman (24)	Omaha	
1941	D. Saxton	Omaha	
1942	H. E. Ohman (25)	Omaha	
1943	D. Saxton (2), A.C. Ludwig	Omaha, Omaha	Tie
1944	A. C. Ludwig (2)	Omaha	
1945	G. Halsey	Omaha	
1946	H. E. Ohman (26)	Omaha	
1947	A. C. Ludwig (3)	Omaha	
1948	L. T. Magee	Omaha	
1949	A. C. Ludwig (4)	Omaha	
1950	L. T. Magee (2)	Omaha	
1951	L. T. Magee (3)	Omaha	
1952	J. L. Spence	Omaha	
1953	L. T. Magee (4)	Omaha	
1954	A. Liepnieks	Lincoln	
1955	L. T. Magee (5)	Omaha	
1956	A. Liepnieks (2)	Lincoln	
1957	R. McLellan	Omaha	
1958	R. McLellan (2)	Omaha	
1959	J. L. Spence (2)	Omaha	
1960	E. Czapski	Lincoln	
1961	A. Liepnieks (3)	Lincoln	
1962	A. Sildmets	Lincoln	
1963	R. Vincent	Omaha	
1964	D. Fritzinger	Lincoln	
1965	G. Ramirez	Omaha	
1966	R. McLellan (3)	Omaha	
1967	J. Tomas	Omaha	
1968	J. Tomas (2)	Omaha	
1969	J. Tomas (3)	Omaha	
1970	J. Tomas (4)	Omaha	
1971	R. Chess	Omaha	
1972	R. McLellan (4)	Omaha	
1973	D. Reynolds	Omaha	
1974	D. Reynolds (2), L. Schmdt	Omaha, Lincoln	Tie
1975	J. Milton	Omaha	
1976	R. Chess (2)	Omaha	
1977	R. Malpert, L. Schmdt (2)	Lincoln, Lincoln	Tie
1978	M. Mathews	Lincoln	
1979	R. Perry	Lincoln	
1980	R. Perry (2)	Lincoln	
1981	A. Hood (Closed), R. Perry (3) (Midwest)	Omaha, Lincoln	Tie
1982	R. Perry (4)	Lincoln	
1983	P. Waldowski	Omaha	
1984	K. Fleming	Lincoln	
1985	R. Chess (3)	Omaha	
1986	M. Mahowald	Lincoln	
1987	R. Chess (4)	Omaha	
1988	M. Mahowald (2)	Lincoln	
1989	G. Colvin, K. Fleming (2)	Lincoln, Lincoln	Tie
1990	M. Dreiger	Omaha	
1991	K. Fleming (3)	Lincoln	
1992	K. Fleming (4)	Omaha	
1993	M. Blankenau	Omaha	
1994	M. Blankenau (2)	Omaha	
1995	W. Pressnall	North Platte	
1996	K. Fleming (5)	Hastings	
1997	K. Fleming (6)	Hastings	
1998	M. Cushing	Lincoln	
1999	M. Cushing (2), M. Dreiger (2)	Lincoln, Omaha	Tie
2000	J. Ballard	Lincoln	
2001	R. Simond	Lincoln	
2002	K. Kiewra	Lincoln	
2003	K. Kiewra (2)	Lincoln	
2004	K. Kiewra (3)	Lincoln	
2005	K. Kiewra (4)	Lincoln	
2006	K. Kiewra (5)	Lincoln	
2007	K. Kiewra (6)	Lincoln	
2008	K. Kiewra (7)	Lincoln	
2009	K. Kiewra (8)	Lincoln	
2010	K. Kiewra (9)	Lincoln	
2011	M. Zeljko	Lincoln	
2012	J. Knapp	Omaha	
2013	B. Fabrikant	Omaha	
2014	B. Fabrikant (2), J. Wan	Omaha, Lincoln	Tie
2015	B. Fabrikant (3)	Omaha	
2016	B. Fabrikant (4)	Omaha	
2017	Y. Tan	Lincoln	
2018	Y. Tan (2)	Lincoln	
2019	Y. Tan (3)	Lincoln	
2020	Kent Nelson, John Linscott	Lincoln, Lincoln	Tie
2021	None		No tournament was held this year
2022	Nicholas Lacroix	Omaha	
2023	Nicholas Lacroix (2), Jacob Wagner	Omaha, Omaha	Tie
2024	Nicholas LaCroix (3), Luke Hengen	Omaha, Omaha	Tie

== See also ==
- Chess in Utah
- Chess in Wyoming
