= Vojtěch Plát =

Slovak chess grandmaster (born 1994)

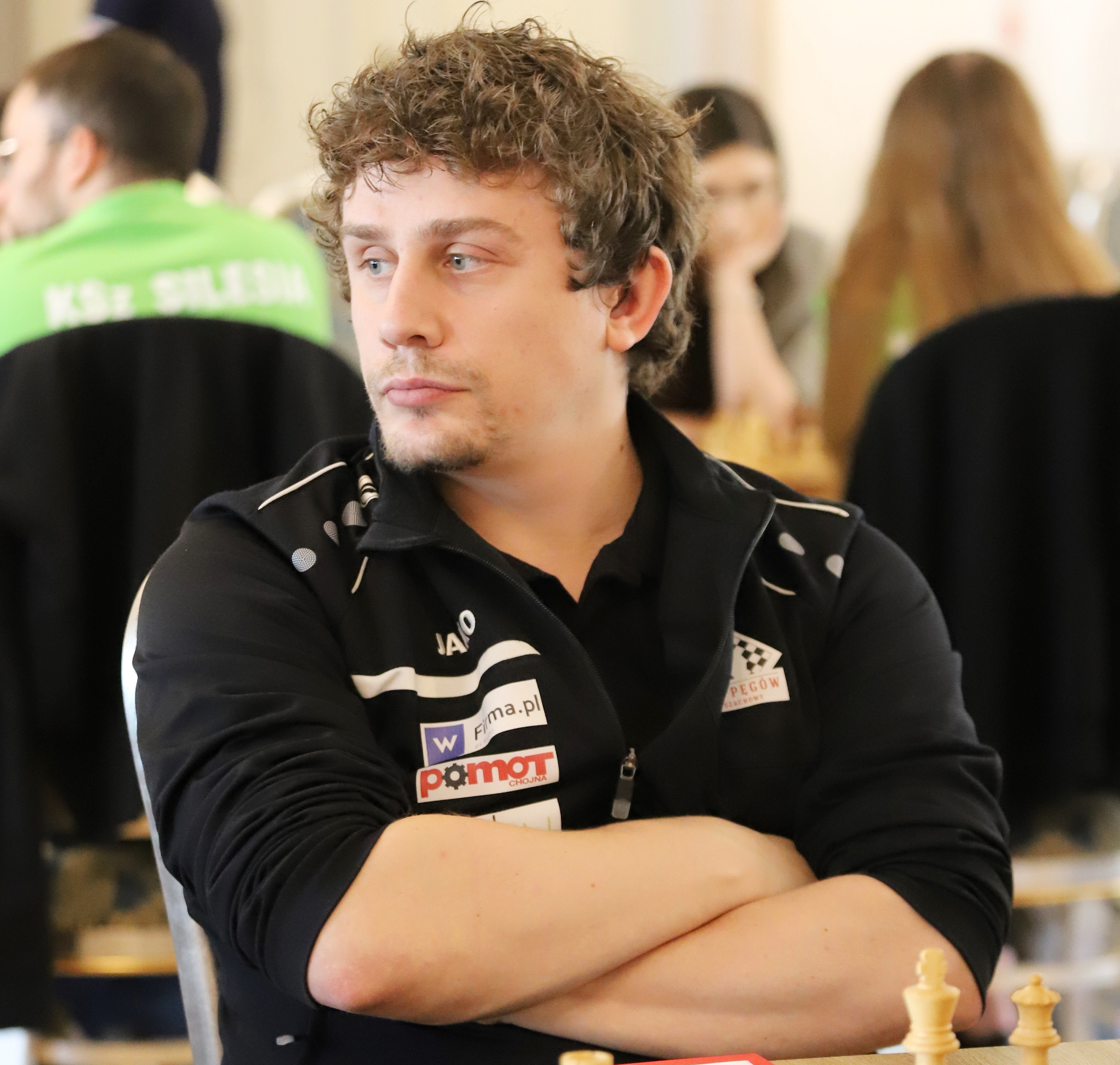
- Vojtěch Plát in 2021

Personal information
- Born: 23 January 1994 (age 32) Rychnov nad Kněžnou, Czech Republic

Chess career
- Country: Czech Republic (until 2026); Slovakia (since 2026)
- Title: Grandmaster (2017)
- FIDE rating: 2491 (July 2026)
- Peak rating: 2589 (December 2019)

Vojtěch Plát (born 23 January 1994) is a Slovak chess grandmaster. He won the Czech Chess Championship in 2016.

== Chess career ==
Born in 1994, Plát earned his international master title in 2009 and his grandmaster title in 2017. He won the Czech Chess Championship in 2016 and 2021.

In 2019, he won the O Losinského Kapra in Kouty nad Desnou, Czech Republic with a score of 8/9 points.

He is the No. 10 ranked Czech player as of July 2020.

On May 31 and June 1 2025, Plát competed in the strongest chess tournament in Nebraska history, an event commemorating of the 50th anniversary of the 1975 U.S. Open. Four grandmasters were present at the anniversary event, including Manuel Petrosyan, Zhou Jiangchao, Karen Grigoryan, and Plát.
