= Dmitry Kononenko =

Ukrainian chess grandmaster (born 1988)

Personal information
- Born: August 23, 1988 (age 38) Dnipro, Ukrainian SSR, Soviet Union

Chess career
- Country: Ukraine
- Title: Grandmaster (2001)
- FIDE rating: 2613 (September 2026)
- Peak rating: 2621 (February 2016)

Dmitry Oleksandrovich Kononenko (Ukrainian: Дмитр́о Олекс́андрович Конон́енко; born August 23, 1988) is a Ukrainian chess grandmaster since 2007 and an international master since 2003. He is the 17th best player in Ukraine and the World's 217th player. His highest rating was 2621 (in February 2016). He is also a Four-player chess theorist, inventing commonly played opening lines.

== Career ==
In Ukrainian championships he won the

- U12 Champion of Ukraine in 1999.
- U16 Champion of Ukraine in 2003 and 2004.
- 3rd place in the U14 Championship of Ukraine in 2000.
- 3rd place in U18 Championship of Ukraine in 2005.
- 2008 championships of Ukraine - 5th place.
- His team won 2nd place in the Ukrainian team chess championship in 2009 and in 2010. He won 2 individual gold medals (2008, 2010) and a silver medal (2009) in this championship.

In other tournaments he won the

- 2000 U12 European Championship - 4th place.
- Silver medal in the World Children's Olympics in Denizli (Turkey) as a member of the Ukrainian team in 2003.
- Champion of the Dnipropetrovsk region in 2003 and 2005- 2007 in classical chess and in 2010 and 2014 in blitz chess.
- In the first international festival "Dnepropetrovsk Autumn" in memory of A.S. Moroz (Dnepropetrovsk, 2012) took 2nd place, in 2013 he ranked 4th and won the blitz tournament.
- Winner of six consecutive blitz marathons of the Czech Open international festival in Czech Pardubice (2008-2013).
