= Nikolai Kabanov =

Russian chess grandmaster (born 1980)

Personal information
- Born: 22 January 1980 (age 46)

Chess career
- Country: Russia
- Title: Grandmaster (2009)
- FIDE rating: 2422 (July 2026)
- Peak rating: 2535 (May 2011)

Nikolai Kabanov (born 22 January 1980) is a Russian chess grandmaster.

== Career ==
Kabanov represented Russia on the third board in the 39th Chess Olympiad in 2010, where he finished with a score of 1.5 points out of 4.

Kabanov qualified for the Chess World Cup 2011, where he was defeated by David Navara in the first round.
