= Yuriy Ajrapetjan =

Ukrainian chess grandmaster (born 1988)

Personal information
- Born: 18 April 1988 (age 38) Yerevan, Armenia

Chess career
- Country: Ukraine (until 2023); Russia (since 2023)
- Title: Grandmaster (2007)
- FIDE rating: 2502 (July 2026)
- Peak rating: 2537 (July 2009)

Yuriy Ajrapetjan (Armenian: Յուրի Հայրապետյան; born 18 April 1988 in Yerevan) is a Ukrainian chess player of Armenian descent.

He studied at Tavrida National V.I. Vernadsky University in Simferopol and works at a bank.

He was awarded the FIDE International Master title in February 2005 and the Grandmaster title in January 2008.

== Best results ==
- 1st at Simferopol 2004
- 2nd at the Crimea Championship 2006
- 1st at Simferopol 2007
- 1st at Alushta Spring 2007
- 1st at Alushta Autumn 2007.

He acquired all of his GM Norms at the same location (Alushta) in the year 2007, and he was rewarded the Grandmaster title when those norms appeared in the FIDE rating of January 2008.

His best Elo rating was 2537 in July 2009.
