= Yuri Vovk =

Ukrainian chess grandmaster (born 1988)

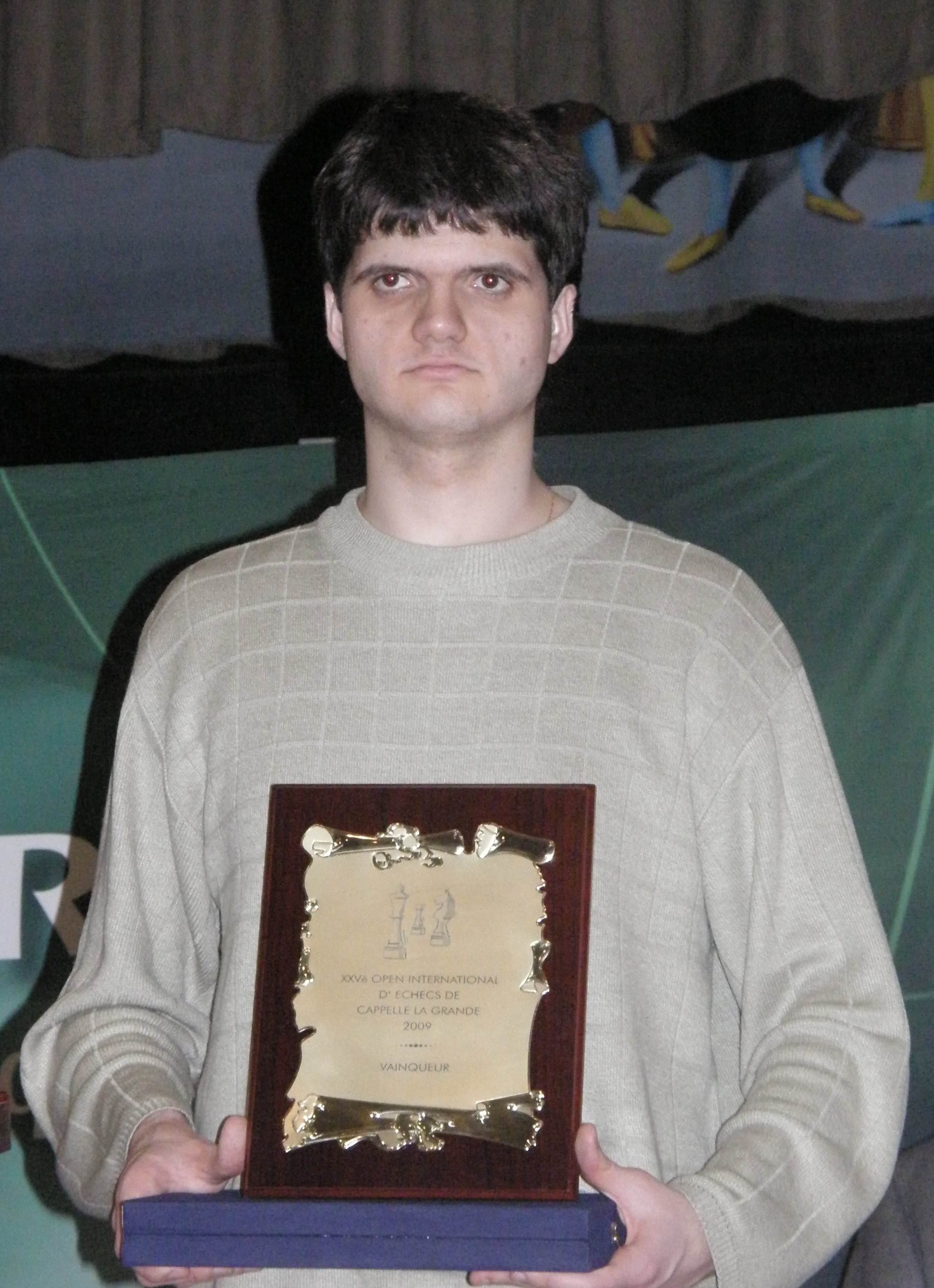

Personal information
- Born: Юрій Вовк; 11 November 1988 (age 37) Lviv, Ukrainian SSR, Soviet Union

Chess career
- Country: Ukraine
- Title: Grandmaster (2008)
- FIDE rating: 2530 (July 2026)
- Peak rating: 2632 (July 2015)

Yuri Bogdanovich Vovk (Ukrainian: Юрій Богданович Вовк; born 11 November 1988) is a Ukrainian chess grandmaster from Lviv. He was trained by Vladimir Grabinsky, coach of the Ukrainian youth team.

== Career ==
In 2007 he was joint winner with Li Chao and G. N. Gopal at the category 12 Lake Sevan round-robin tournament in Martuni, Armenia. He was awarded the grandmaster title in 2008.

In February 2009 he shared first place in the Cappelle-la-Grande Open in France with Sanan Sjugirov, Parimarjan Negi, Maxim Rodshtein, Sergey Fedorchuk, Eric Hansen, Alexei Fedorov, and Vlad-Cristian Jianu, ahead of 106 Grandmasters and 76 International Masters, scoring 7.5 points out of 9. In 2013 he finished equal first, placing eighth on tiebreak.

Other tournament results:

- 2003: 1st at Ternopil
- 2004: 2nd at the Ukrainian under-16 championship
- 2007: wins the under-20 Ukrainian championships; = 1st at Liverpool; 2nd at Rochefort
- 2008: 1st at Szombathely; 2nd at Lviv
- 2011: 1st–3rd with Maxim Turov and Vladimir Georgiev in the Dutch Open in Dieren.
- 2011: 1st in the Vasylyshyn Memorial.

Vovk finished fifth at the 2015 European Individual Chess Championship in Jerusalem, scoring 7.5/11. This result enabled him to qualify for the Chess World Cup 2015, where he knocked out Ray Robson in the first round. In round two he was eliminated by Wei Yi in the blitz tiebreak games.

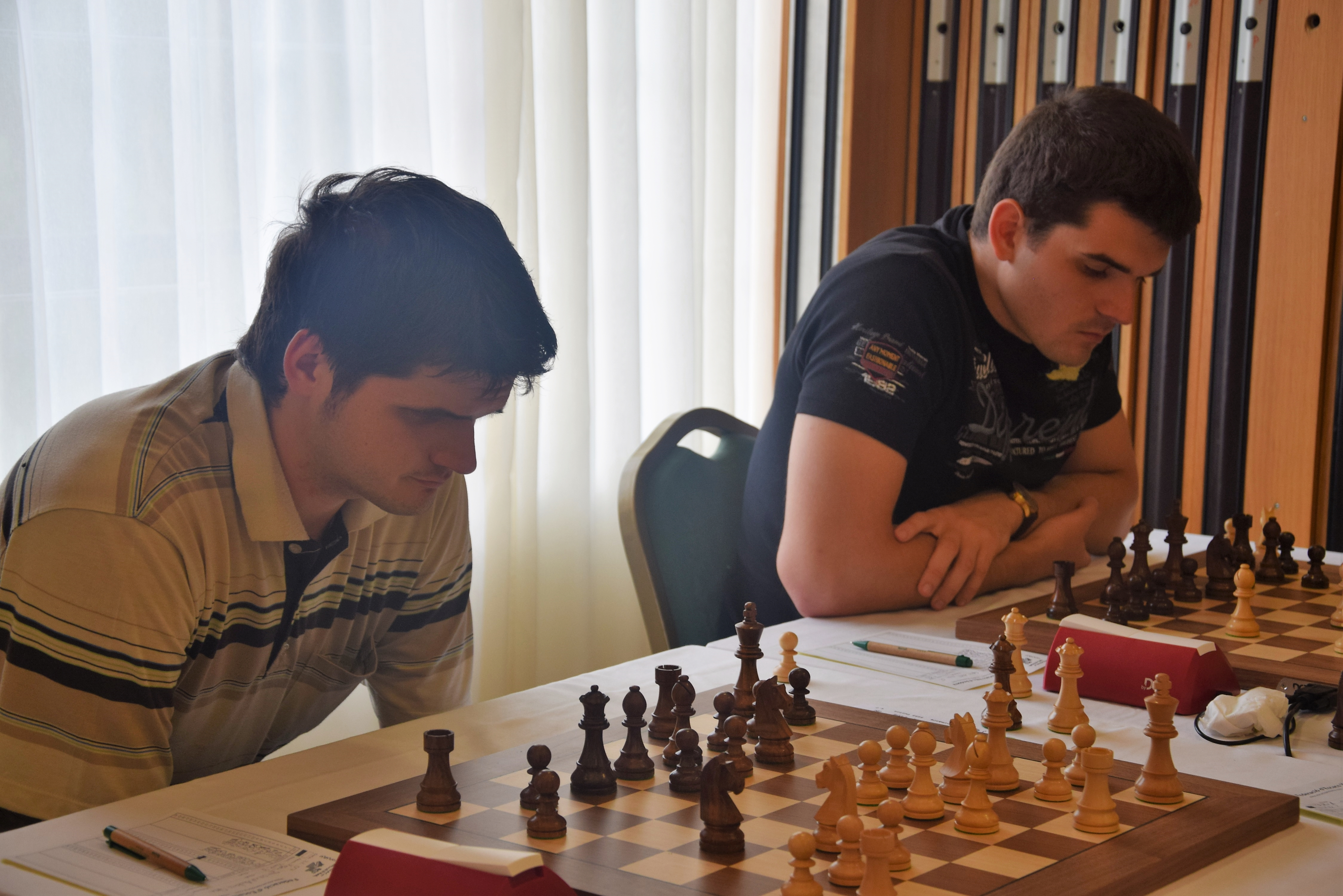
Andrey and Yuri Vovk at 2015 Andorra open

He is the older brother of Andrey Vovk.
