= Aleksei Pridorozhni =

Russian chess grandmaster (born 1981)

Personal information
- Born: 27 August 1981 (age 44) Surgut, Russia

Chess career
- Country: Russia
- Title: Grandmaster (2011)
- FIDE rating: 2477 (July 2026)
- Peak rating: 2602 (November 2019)

Aleksei Vladimirovich Pridorozhni (born 27 August 1981) is a Russian chess player. He was awarded the title of Grandmaster by FIDE in 2011.

Born in Surgut, Pridorozhni competed in the FIDE World Cup in 2005, 2007, 2009, 2011, and 2019. He was eliminated in the first round on each occasion. He won the A2 group of the Aeroflot Open in 2010 edging out Igor Glek, Semen Dvoirys, Sergey Pavlov, and Mikhail Panarin on tiebreak score. In the same year Pridorozhni participated in the 39th Chess Olympiad, held in Khanty-Mansiysk, playing for Team Russia 3, and in the European Club Cup, playing for Team Yugra, which won the silver medal. In 2016 he won the Rashid Nezhmetdinov Memorial tournament in Kazan with a score of 8 points out of 9. Pridorozhni won the Russian Rapid Chess Championship of 2019.
