= Nikolai Chadaev =

Russian chess grandmaster (born 1988)

Nikolai Chadaev is a Russian chess grandmaster born in 1988. He achieved the Grandmaster title in 2010 and reached a peak FIDE rating of 2591 in 2012.

== Career ==
Some of his major accomplishments include tying for 1st place in the Russian u-20 Chess Championship in 2008, winning the Moscow Chess Championship in 2010 and 2011, as well as tying for 10th place at the 2012 World Blitz Championship alongside Boris Gelfand.
