= Chess in Wyoming =

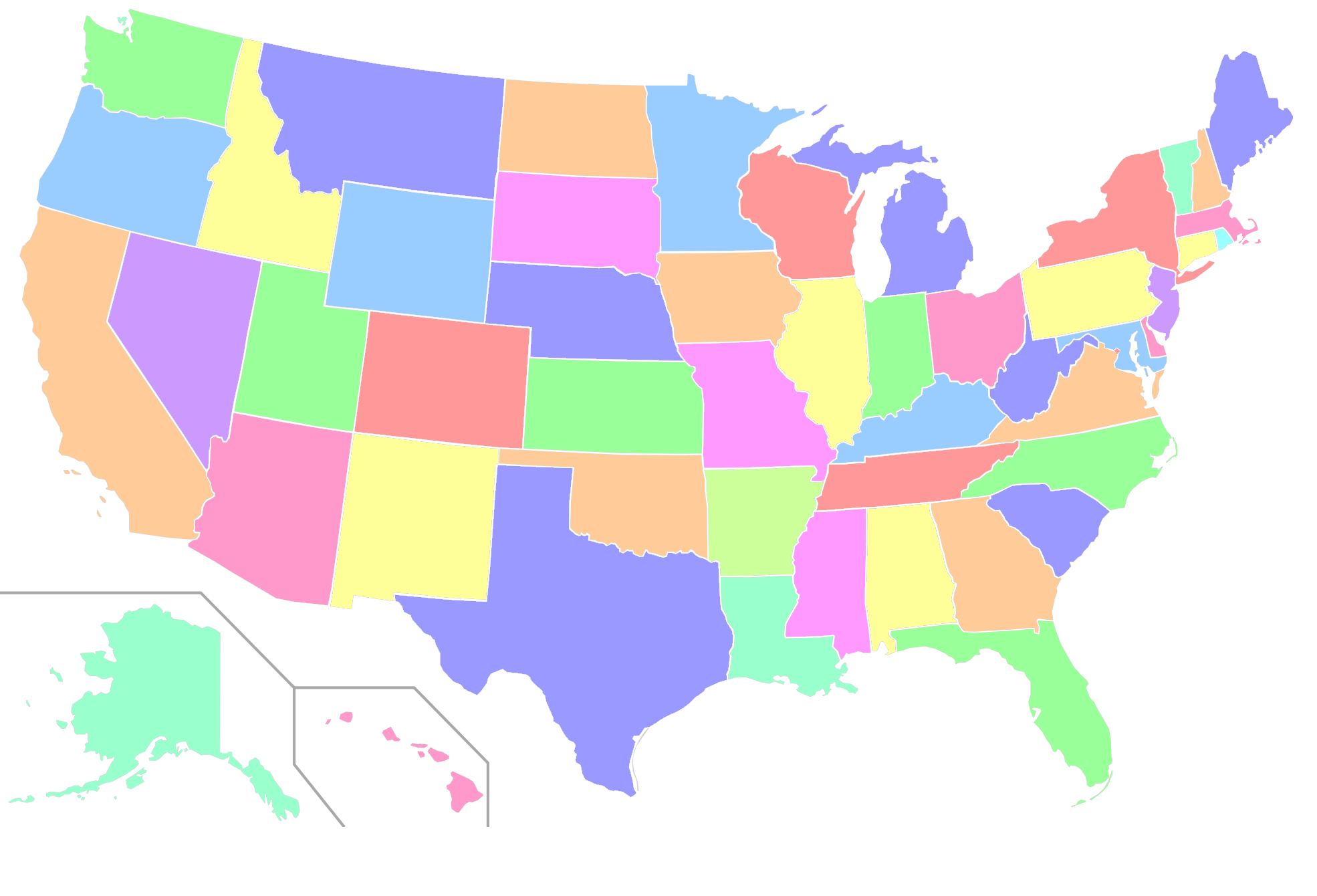
- Top Player: William Aepli (2160 USCF)
- Champion: Daniel Joelson
- USCF Affiliate: Wyoming Chess Association
- Active Players: 62

Chess in Wyoming refers to competitive chess played within the state of Wyoming. As of June 2026, Wyoming only has 90 players registered with the United States Chess Federation. The current USCF Wyoming state affiliate is the Wyoming Chess Association.

== History ==
The first recorded Wyoming state chess championship took place in 1949. It continued to be held annually except in 1960, and then in 2020 due to COVID-19 lockdowns. Originally part of a greater Wyoming Open tournament, the state championship eventually split off into being its own closed tournament.

In the 20th century, ranchers would watch for trains to try initiating games against traveling chess players such as Samuel Reshevsky. New Orleans chess player Jude Acers spent some time in Jackson, where he played against anyone willing to challenge him. Some chess tournaments were held in Jackson Hole over the past few decades, but they were one-time events. Due to a lack of chess tournaments in the state, Wyoming residents often travel to play in chess competitions in neighboring states. Daniel Joelson won the state championship 21 times, first winning at the age of 17 in 1984. As of January 2023, Joelson wanted Cheyenne to have an active local chess club of its own.

Former World Chess Champion Garry Kasparov visited the state in November 2014. He spoke with a math professor from the University of Wyoming, who touted the educational benefits of learning to play chess.

In May 2017, the PODER Academy Chess Team competed in that year's elementary school Super National tournament in Nashville. The school placed 18th out of 75.

On May 7, 2022, Jackson Hole Classical Academy held its first scholastic chess tournament in five years. This tournament would qualify four students to compete in the national tournament over the summer. The students who qualified would attend the school's week-long chess camp. Regarding this tournament, a virtual chess coach from Los Angeles for students from the school stated:

I went back in, in preparation for this, this chapter we're having and looked at the different tournaments that scholastic tournaments that had been held in Wyoming over the last 20 years and they were few and far between. Usually when they were held, they had more kids from Colorado than they did from Wyoming, and I couldn't find any of them that had over eight kids from Wyoming that were represented at one of the tournaments.

During summer 2022, the Riverton Chess Club was established. The club began meeting on Wednesdays at the Central Wyoming College Library.

On February 11, 2023, Worland Middle School hosted the community's first chess tournament in years.

University of Wyoming Chess Club
- Type: University Chess Club
- Location: Laramie, Wyoming
- Country: United States
- Affiliation: University of Wyoming
- Major events: Laramie Open
- Website: Instagram

The University of Wyoming has a chess club that meets weekly in the Skylight Lounge of the Student Union. The club began hosting the annual Laramie Open Chess Tournament in spring 2024.

In June 2025, Kamari Barth became the first Wyomingite to compete in the national invitation-only Susan Polgar tournament at Webster University in St. Louis. Barth's trip was sponsored by the Sheridan Chess Association.

Jackson Hole Classical Academy opened a new campus during the 2025-26 school year. The campus includes a dedicated chess room, and chess is part of the curriculum for students in grades 3 through 5.

On November 19, 2025, Jackson Hole News&Guide featured Chess Night, a Jackson chess club, in an article. The club, founded by Chris von Strasser, meets weekly from 6 to 8 p.m. at the Center for the Arts. Von Strasser founded the club to provide an over-the-board alternative to online chess matches. Chess Night had sparse attendance over the course of its first two meetings, though von Strasser remained optimistic regarding future attendance prospects.

=== Sheridan Chess Association ===
Sheridan Chess Association
- Type: Regional Chess Association
- Location: Sheridan, Wyoming
- Country: United States
- Major events: Wyoming Community Foundation Open
- Website: Official Website

The Sheridan Chess Association promotes chess education at Sheridan schools.

From April 30 to May 1 in 2022, the Sheridan Chess Association (founded in December 2021) began hosting an annual chess tournament in Sheridan, Wyoming at Sheridan College.

In 2022, 76 players competed with a guaranteed prize pool of $3,875 and a top prize of $1,600. Some players in attendance included Alexander Fishbein, Justin Sarkar, and masters Sullivan McConnell, Joel Johnson, Richard Shtivelband, James Neal, and Brian Wall. Sarkar won the Open section while Kevin Kuehnel and Karl Lehman tied for first place in the Under 1600 section. Prior to the start of the tournament, Fishbein conducted a simultaneous exhibition against 26 other players at the local YMCA, winning 25 and drawing 1.

In 2023, the tournament expanded to include $7,575 in prizes.

In 2024, the tournament featured three grandmasters, including GM Bryan Smith as a first-time competitor.

In 2025, the Sheridan Chess Association rebranded the tournament as the Wyoming Community Foundation Open Chess Tournament. 79 players competed across four sections. Participants included "three chess grandmasters, three national masters, three life masters, and state champions from Wyoming, Montana and Colorado." Luka Budisavljević was one of the grandmasters present. Prior to the main tournament, Budisavljević conducted a simultaneous exhibition and won all 24 games. Sheridan High School student Daniel Hoopes held out the longest in a game that lasted over 30 moves. The 2025 iteration of the tournament contained a $9,000 guaranteed prize pool. Ultimately, the Open division ended in a four-way tie.

The 2026 iteration of the tournament took place from May 1 to May 3. The event had a $9,000 guaranteed prize pool, similar to 2025. Three grandmasters signed up for the tournament. The day before the tournament began, GM Bryan Smith played in a simultaneous exhibition at the Sheridan Fulmer Public Library. The event ended in a three-way tie for 1st place between GM Zhou Jianchao, GM Bryan Smith, and NM Griffin McConnell.

== Competitors ==
As of February 2026, the following people are the top rated active USCF players from Wyoming:

Position	Name	USCF Rating	USCF Titles
1	William Alexander Aepli	2160	1st Category
2	Daniel Joelson	2102	Candidate Master (norms-based)
3	Casey Borcher	2005	2nd Category
4	Peter Brizard	1861	
5	James Kulbacki	1831	1st Category
6	Guy Hadley	1820	2nd Category
7	Mike Babigian	1814	
8	Rohan Jacob David	1814	2nd Category
9	Amber Lock	1675	3rd Category
10	Joseph Pleso	1575	2nd Category

Other top Wyoming chess players who aren't currently active USCF members include NM Andre Peroit (2252 Rating), David A Wallace (2093 Rating), and four-time state champion Steve Smith (2085 Rating).

GM Alexander Fishbein used to be a Wyoming chess player, the only Grandmaster to come from the state as of January 2025. Upon earning the FIDE title, Fishbein was congratulated by Senator Alan Simpson. His current state is now Tennessee. He would visit the state again to compete in the Sheridan Wyoming Open tournament.

== List of state champions (1949–2024) ==
No.	Year	Winner(s)	Notes
1	1949	Frank Dillon	
2	1950	S.D. Ferris	
3	1951	Chester Ingle	
4	1952	Chester Ingle (2)	
5	1953	Vic Stalick	
6	1954	Wilmer E. Stevens	
7	1955	Robert F. McGregor	
8	1956	Robert F. McGregor (2)	
9	1957	Chester Ingle (3)	
10	1958	Bob Wendling	
11	1959	Mohamed Omar	Omar was a student at the University of Wyoming from Afghanistan
12	1960	None	No tournament was held this year
13	1961	Rohland Pohle	
14	1962	W. E. Stevens	
15	1963	J. Bulinga	
16	1964	Bob Wendling (2)	
17	1965	Bob Wendling (3)	
18	1966	Bob Wendling (4)	
19	1967	Bob Burley	
20	1968	Bob Wendling (5)	
21	1969	Bob Wendling (6)	
22	1970	Bob Wendling (7)	
23	1971	Bob Wendling (8)	
24	1972	Bob Burley (2)	
25	1973	Bob Burley (3)	
26	1974	Steve Smith	
27	1975	Marc Lynn	
28	1976	Marc Lynn (2)	
29	1977	Steve Smith (2)	
30	1978	Daniel M. Finucane	
31	1979	Steve Smith (3)	
32	1980	Marc Lynn (3)	
33	1981	Steve Smith (4)	
34	1982	Alex Fishbein	
35	1983	Alex Fishbein (2)	
36	1984	Daniel E. Joelson	
37	1985	Alex Fishbein (3)	
38	1986	Roger L. Sample	
39	1987	Daniel E. Joelson (2)	
40	1988	Marc Lynn (4)	
41	1989	Ronald A. Matous	
42	1990	Ronald A. Matous (2)	
43	1991	Daniel E. Joelson (3)	
44	1992	Daniel E. Joelson (4)	
45	1993	Daniel E. Joelson (5)	
46	1994	Daniel E. Joelson (6)	
47	1995	Daniel E. Joelson (7)	
48	1996	Daniel E. Joelson (8)	
49	1997	Daniel E. Joelson (9)	
50	1998	Daniel E. Joelson (10)	
51	1999	Daniel E. Joelson (11)	
52	2000	Daniel E. Joelson (12)	
53	2001	Daniel E. Joelson (13)	
54	2002	Daniel E. Joelson (14)	
55	2003	Andrew M. Smith	
56	2004	Bruce Johnson	
57	2005	Daniel E. Joelson (15)	
58	2006	John L. Pedry	
59	2007	Daniel E. Joelson (16)	
60	2008	Bruce Johnson (2)	
61	2009	Dan W. Tanner	
62	2010	Guy Hadley	
63	2011	Guy Hadley (2) and James Kulbacki	Tie
64	2012	Timothy Schoessler	
65	2013	Daniel E. Joelson (17)	
66	2014	Stefan Heinz	
67	2015	Daniel E. Joelson (18), James Kulbacki (2), Timothy Schoessler (2), Guy Hadley (3), Stefan Heinz (2), Bruce Johnson (2), Richard Cohen, and Todd Crawford	Tie
68	2016	Andrew Smith (2) and Guy Hadley (4)	Tie
69	2017	Andrew Smith (3)	
70	2018	Will Aepli	
71	2019	Daniel E. Joelson (19)	Tie
72	2020	None	No tournament was held this year
73	2021	Will Aepli (2) and Bradley FIck	Tie
74	2022	Daniel E. Joelson (20) and Timothy Schoessler (3)	Tie
75	2023	Will Aepli (3)	
76	2024	Daniel E. Joelson (21) and Will Aepli (4)	Tie
77	2025	Daniel E. Joelson (22)	

== Board of Directors ==
The current Wyoming Chess Association Board of Directors is as follows:

Position	Name	Location
Chair	Brian Walker	Cheyenne
Vice Chair	Brian Kuehl	Sheridan
Treasurer	William Hoffman	Casper
Secretary	Bradley Fick	Cody
Director	Barbie Fortune	Illinois
Director	Dr. Jon Fortune	Illinois
Director	Amber Lock	Gillette
Director	Elizabeth Scott	Casper
Director	Michael Olson	

== See also ==
- Chess in Utah
- Chess in Nebraska
