= Andrey Vovk =

Ukrainian chess grandmaster (born 1991)

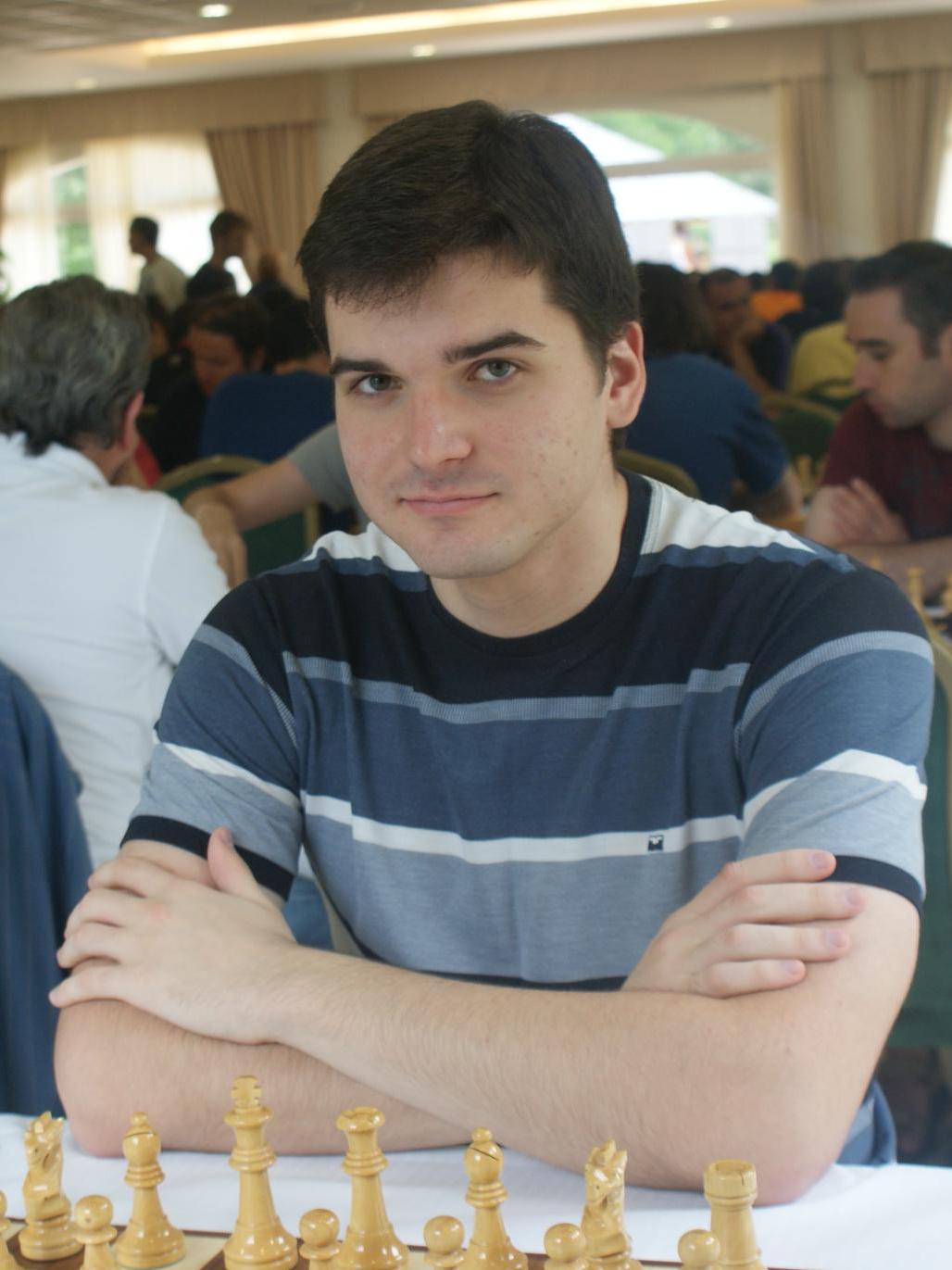

Personal information
- Born: Андрій Вовк; November 22, 1991 (age 34) Lviv, Ukraine

Chess career
- Country: Ukraine
- Title: Grandmaster (2009)
- FIDE rating: 2597 (July 2026)
- Peak rating: 2654 (April 2015)
- Peak ranking: No. 97 (April 2015)

Andrey Bogdanovich Vovk (Ukrainian: Андрій Вовк) (born November 22, 1991) is a Ukrainian chess Grandmaster (2009).

In 2008 he tied for 3rd–5th with Oganes Danielian and Evgeni Vasiukov in the Transkarpathian Cup in Mukachevo. In 2009 he was second in the Hogeschool Zeeland Chess Tournament in Vlissingen. In 2010 he came first at Rosenheim.

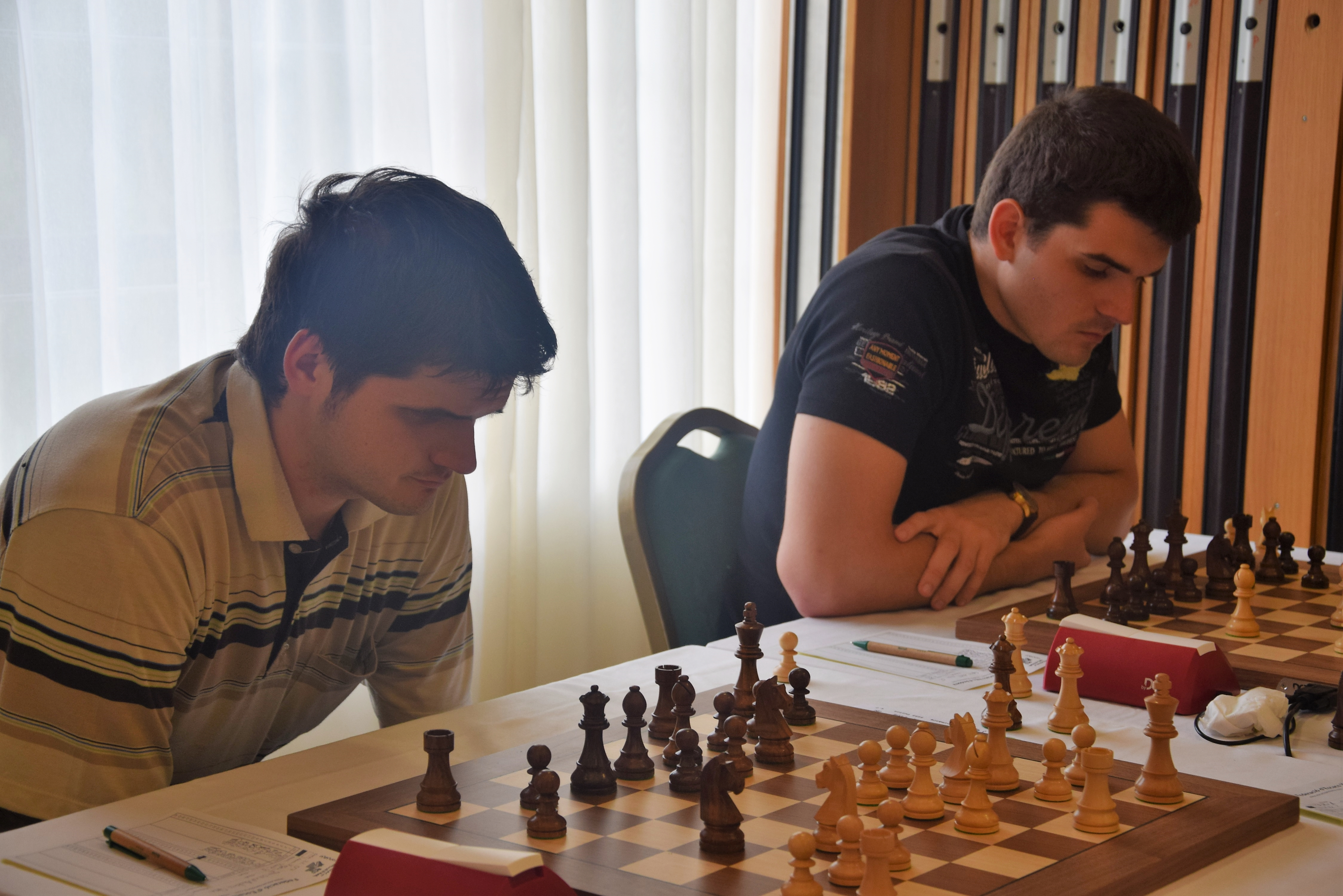
Andrey and Yuri Vovk at 2015 Andorra open

Vovk is the 19th best player in Ukraine. He is the younger brother of Yuri Vovk.
