= Vladimir Georgiev (chess player) =

Bulgarian-Macedonian chess grandmaster (born 1975)

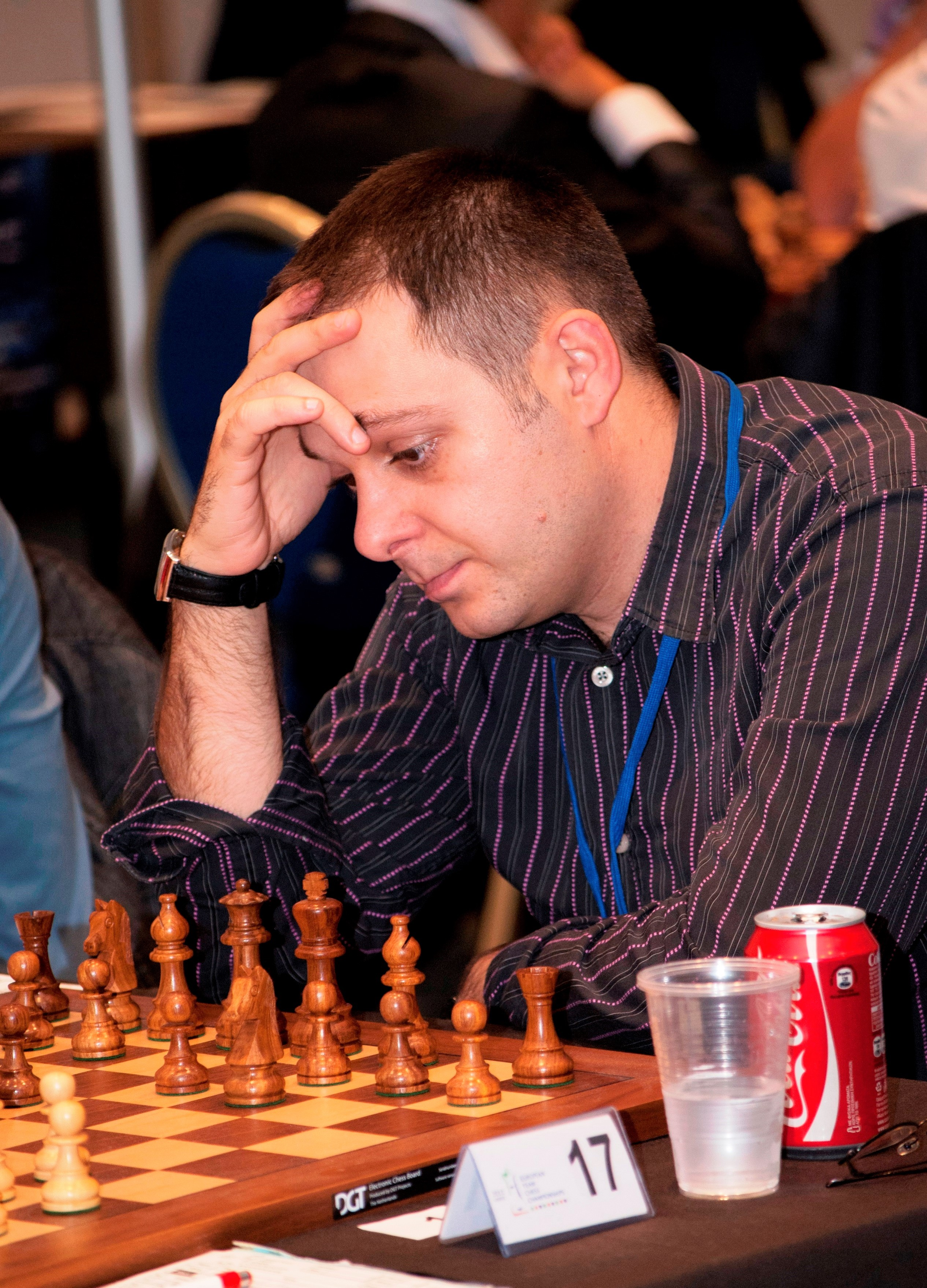

Personal information
- Born: 27 August 1975 (age 50) Sofia, Bulgaria

Chess career
- Country: Bulgaria (until 2002); North Macedonia (since 2002)
- Title: Grandmaster (2000)
- Peak rating: 2596 (October 2003)

Vladimir Georgiev (Bulgarian: Владимир Георгиев; born 27 August 1975 in Sofia, Bulgaria) is a Bulgarian-Macedonian chess grandmaster. He became an International Master in 1995 and a Grandmaster in 2000.

Vladimir Georgiev first caught the eye of the chess world in 1992, when he finished second in the European Junior Chess Championship.

He became Bulgarian National Champion in 1995 and champion of Macedonia in 2007. Since 2002 he played for the Republic of Macedonia. In 2004 he came second in the Kish GM Tournament. In 2011 he tied for first–third place with Maxim Turov and Yuri Vovk in the Dutch Open in Dieren.

He is the trainer of former Women's World Chess Championship Antoaneta Stefanova. He has a daughter and wife and resides in Chicago and regularly visits Florida

Georgiev transferred from the Bulgarian chess federation to the Macedonian in 2002.
