= Andrei Volokitin =

Ukrainian chess grandmaster (born 1986)

Andrii Volokytin
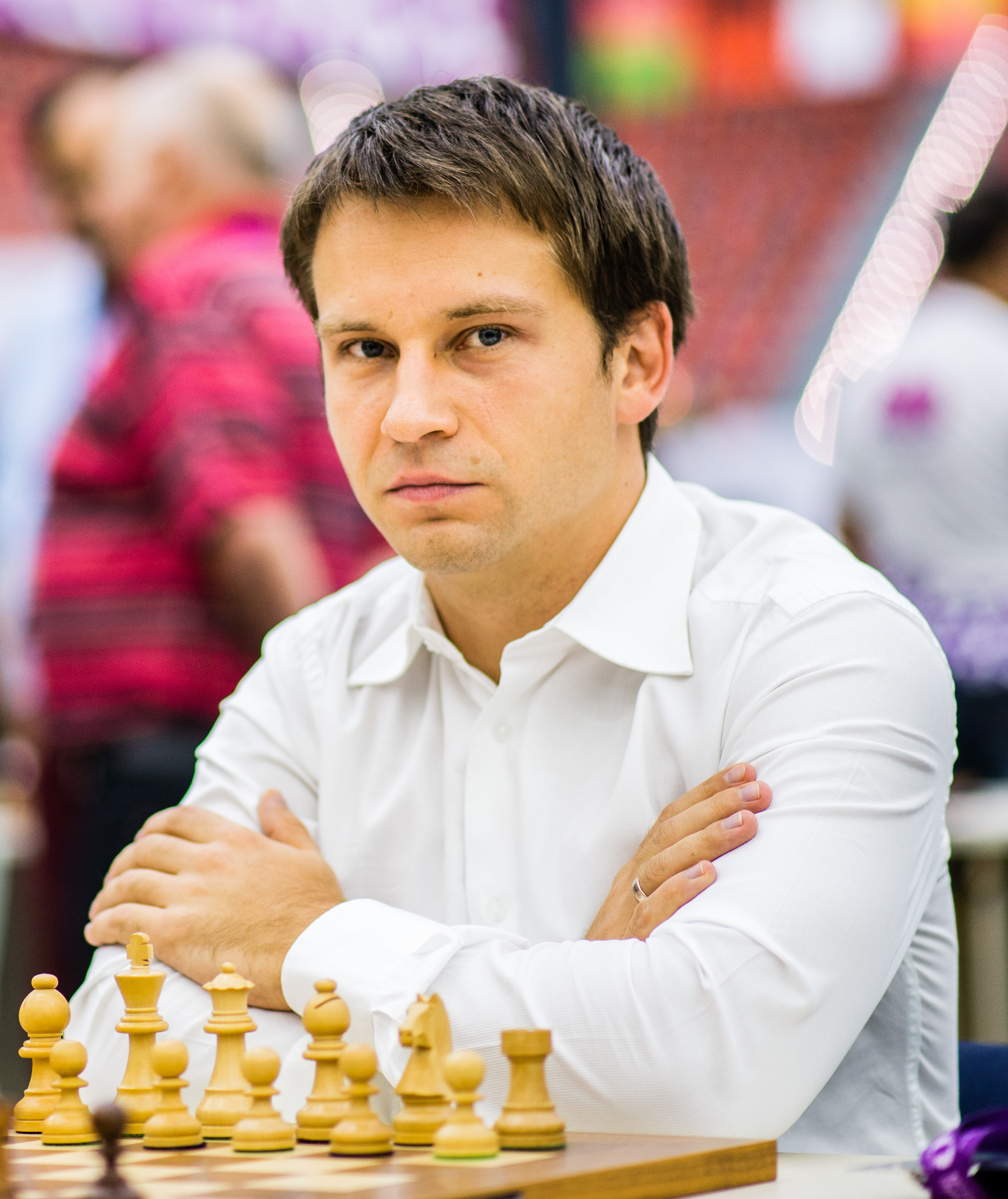
- Volokytin in 2016

Personal information
- Born: 18 June 1986 (age 40) Lviv, Ukrainian SSR, Soviet Union

Chess career
- Country: Ukraine
- Title: Grandmaster (2001)
- FIDE rating: 2617 (July 2026)
- Peak rating: 2725 (March 2013)
- Peak ranking: No. 20 (January 2005)

Andrii Oleksandrovych Volokitin (Ukrainian: Андрій Волокітін, Andrii Volokitin; born 18 June 1986 in Lviv) is a Ukrainian chess grandmaster. He is a two-time Ukrainian champion and has competed in four Chess Olympiads, winning team gold in 2004 along with team bronze in 2012.

== Chess career ==
He won two medals at the World Youth Chess Championship, taking silver in 1998 at Oropesa del Mar at under-12 level and bronze at the same venue a year later in the under-14 category. In 1999, he was a member of the Ukrainian national youth team which won the U-16 Chess Olympiad in Artek, Ukraine.

He achieved the grandmaster title in 2001, when he was 15 years old. In 2004, he entered the top 100 of the FIDE world ranking list, won the 73rd Ukrainian Chess Championship and was a member of the gold medal–winning national team at the 36th Chess Olympiad. In 2005 he won the Lausanne Young Masters tournament with a rating performance of 2984.

In January 2012, Volokytin won the Donostia Chess Festival's knockout tournament in San Sebastián, Basque Country, Spain, by defeating Viktor Láznička in the final. In this event each player faced the opponent on two boards simultaneously, playing White on one and Black on the other. This peculiar format, which was held for the first time in this tournament, was later named "Basque chess".

In 2015, he won the Ukrainian championship, held in Lviv, edging out on tiebreak Martyn Kravtsiv and Zahar Efimenko, after all three players scored 7 points from 11 games. In 2016, Volokytin won as clear first the 20th Vidmar Memorial, played as international invitation tournament in Bled, Slovenia.

== Books ==
- Andrii Volokytin, Vladimir Grabinsky, Perfect Your Chess (Gambit, 2007) ISBN 1-904600-82-4
