= Boris Savchenko =

Russian chess grandmaster (born 1986)

Personal information
- Born: 10 July 1986 (age 39) Leningrad, Russian SFSR, Soviet Union

Chess career
- Country: Russia
- Title: Grandmaster (2007)
- FIDE rating: 2490 (July 2026)
- Peak rating: 2655 (April 2009)
- Peak ranking: No. 71 (January 2009)

Boris Vladimirovich Savchenko (Russian: Борис Савченко; born 10 July 1986) is a Russian chess player. He was awarded the title of Grandmaster by FIDE in 2007.

== Chess career ==
Savchenko competed in the FIDE World Cup 2007 as one of the five FIDE president nominees and was eliminated in the first round by compatriot Alexander Motylev. In 2008, he won the championship of Moscow and tied for 1st–6th with Sergei Tiviakov, Vladimir Malakhov, Yuriy Kuzubov, Peter Heine Nielsen and Jonny Hector in the Politiken Cup, held in Helsingør, Denmark.

In 2009, Savchenko won the Baku Open edging out Gata Kamsky on tiebreak, after both players finished on 7½/9 points, and competed in the FIDE World Cup, where he was knocked out by Wang Yue in the second round. Savchenko came first in the 34th Rashid Nezhmetdinov Cup in Kazan in 2012. The following year he won the Moscow Open. In 2014 he finished first in the Nakhchivan Open on tiebreak over Eltaj Safarli, Aleksandr Shimanov and Rauf Mamedov. Savchenko took clear first place in the PSC/Puregold International Chess Challenge in Olongapo, Philippines in 2015 with a score of 9½/10, two and half points ahead of the closest followers.

He tied for first with Rauf Mamedov at the 2015 European Blitz Championship in Minsk scoring 18/22 points, but took the silver medal on tiebreak. In 2016 Savchenko won for the second time the Moscow championship. He also won the Moscow Open again in 2019.

== Personal life ==
Born in Leningrad, he moved with his family to Krasnodar at eight years old. Savchenko later moved to Moscow to study at the Russian State University for the Humanities.

== Notable games ==
- Boris Savchenko vs Vladimir Belov, Russian Club Cup (2006), Sicilian Defense, 1-0
- Boris Savchenko vs Kiril D Georgiev, Aeroflot Open (2006), Scotch Game, 1-0
