= David Baramidze =

German chess grandmaster (born 1988)

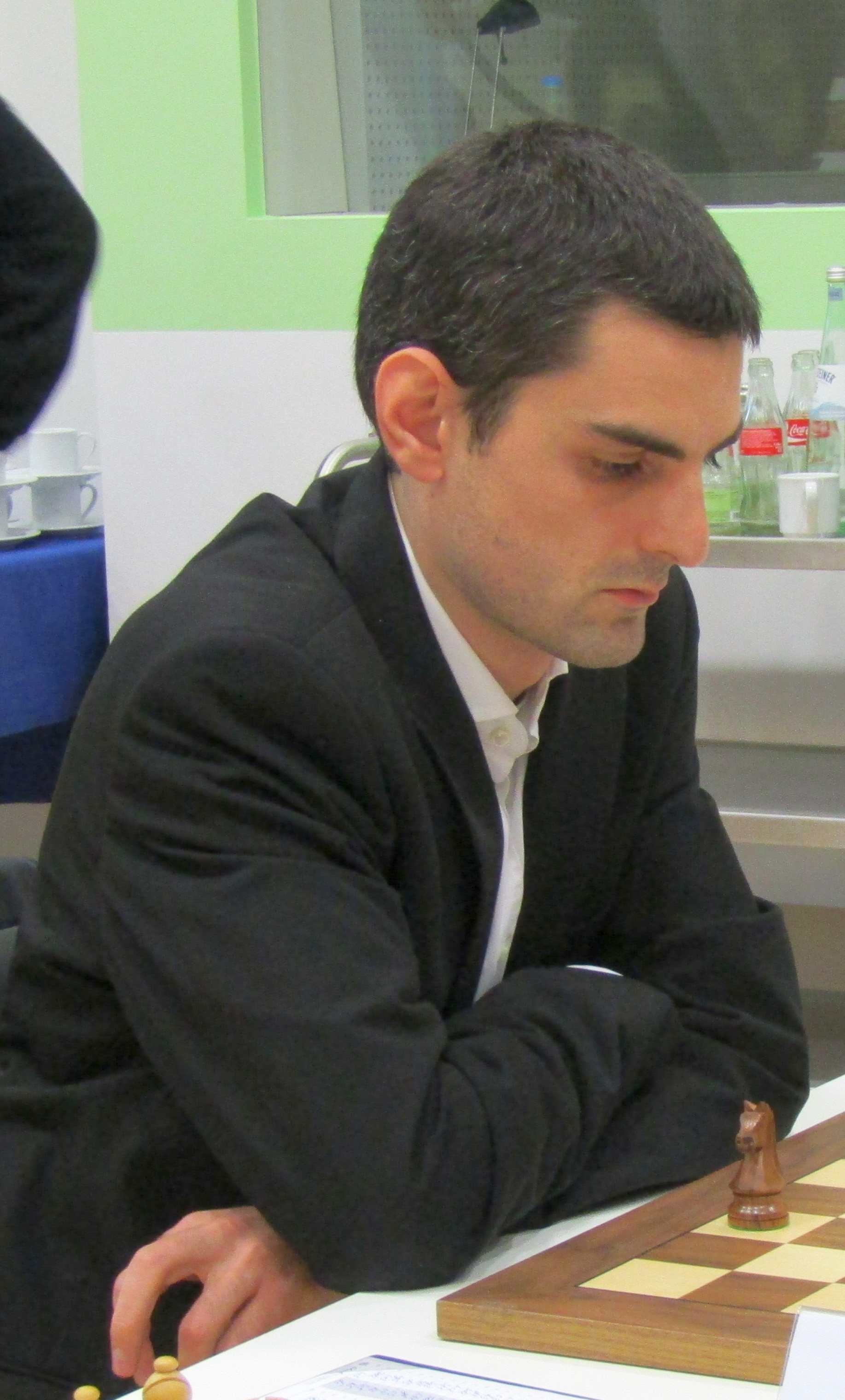

Personal information
- Born: September 27, 1988 (age 38) Tbilisi, Georgia

Chess career
- Country: Germany
- Title: Grandmaster (2004)
- FIDE rating: 2551 (November 2026)
- Peak rating: 2621 (March 2018)

David Baramidze (Georgian: დავით ბარამიძე, Davit' Baramidze; born September 27, 1988) is a German chess Grandmaster.

Baramidze was born in Tbilisi, Georgia. He started playing chess in 1995 and earned the title of Grandmaster in 2004, making him the youngest German Grandmaster ever. In this year, he also finished 2nd in the World Youth Championships. He is currently ranked 14th in Germany (Elo rating 2578, December 2025). He represented Germany in the 2008 Chess Olympiad in Dresden. He works in the IT sector.
