= Peter Svidler =

Russian chess grandmaster (born 1976)

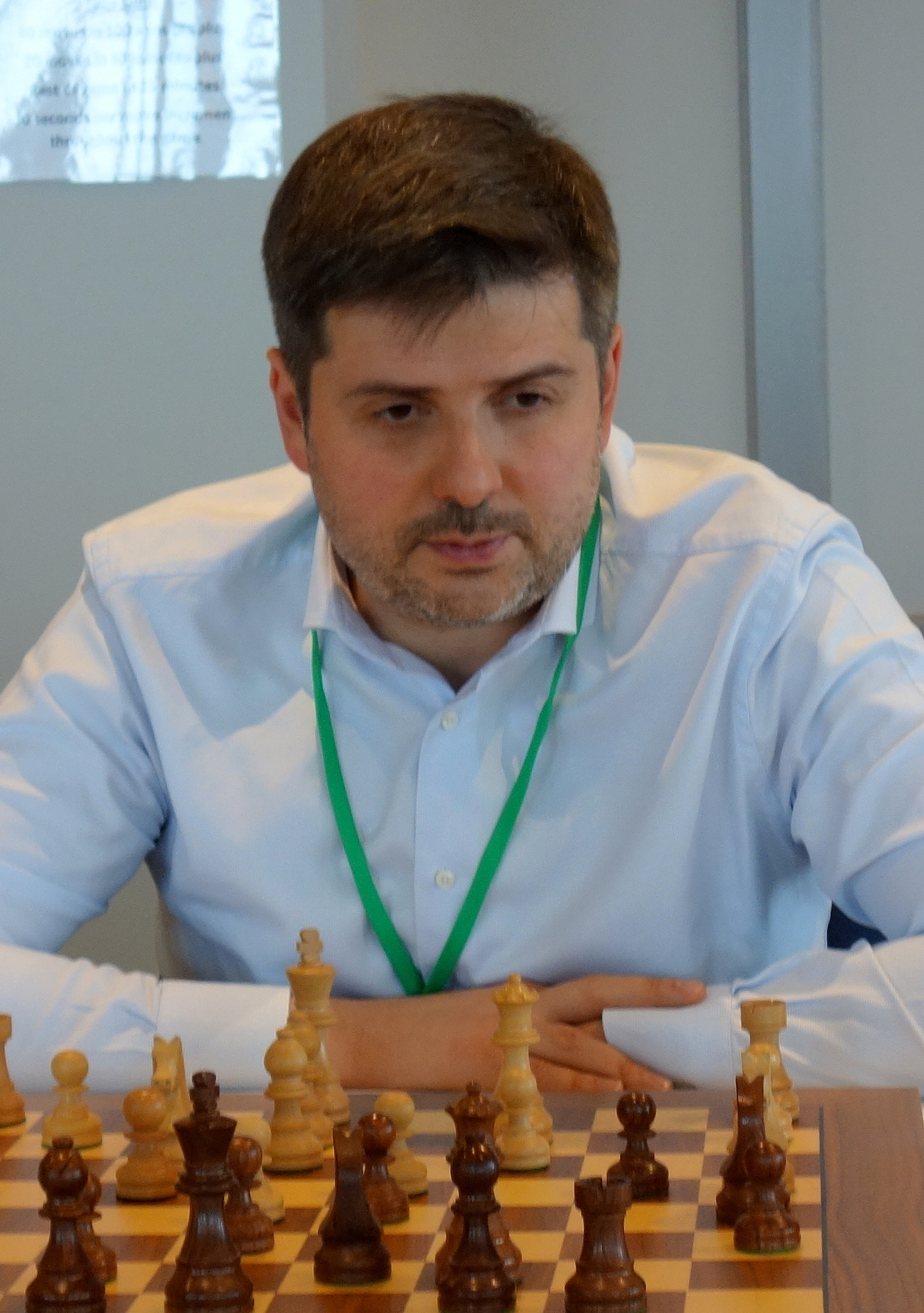
- Svidler in 2019

Personal information
- Born: Pyotr Veniaminovich Svidler; 17 June 1976 (age 50) Leningrad, Russian SFSR, Soviet Union

Chess career
- Country: Soviet Union (until 1991); Russia (1991–2022); FIDE (since 2022)
- Title: Grandmaster (1994)
- FIDE rating: 2682 (October 2026)
- Peak rating: 2769 (May 2013)
- Peak ranking: No. 4 (January 2004)

Pyotr Veniaminovich Svidler (Russian: Пётр Вениами́нович Сви́длер; born 17 June 1976), commonly known as Peter Svidler, is a Russian chess grandmaster and commentator who is an eight-time Russian Chess Champion.

Svidler has competed in three World Championship tournaments: in the period with split title the FIDE World Chess Championship 2002 and 2005, and after reunification the World Chess Championship 2007. He also played in three Candidates Tournaments, in 2013, 2014 and 2016. His best results at this level have been third in 2005 and 2013.

Eight-time Russian Champion (1994, 1995, 1997, 2003, 2008, 2011, 2013, 2017), he has represented Russia at the Chess Olympiad ten times (1994–2010; 2014) winning five team gold medals, two team silvers and an individual bronze. Svidler won the Chess World Cup 2011, was runner-up in the World Blitz Championship in 2006 and won at Fontys Tilburg, Biel and Gibraltar. Svidler also tied for first at Dortmund, Aeroflot Open and Karpov Poikovsky. He also assisted Vladimir Kramnik at the Classical World Championship matches in 2000 and 2004.

== Chess career ==
=== Early years ===
Svidler learned to play chess when he was six years old. His first trainer was Viacheslav Stjazhkin. He made his tournament debut in 1989, scoring 5 points from 11 games at the USSR Junior Championship in Pinsk. He scored 7/11 for tied eighth place in the USSR Juniors in 1990 and 5/9 in Oakland. He became an International Master in 1991 and the following year tied for first place with Ragim Gasimov and Vadim Zvjaginsev in the last USSR Junior Championship in Yurmala, scoring 8/11.

Svidler twice attended the Botvinnik–Kasparov School. One of those sessions was during the Baleares Open in Mallorca in December 1989. He transferred to the Dvoretsky–Yusupov School upon the former's closure. Mark Dvoretsky said that Svidler had to get written consent from Kasparov's mother in order to avoid accusations of taking students from that school.

In 1993, he started work with coach and International Master Andrei Lukin. In a 2011 question & answer session, Svidler said of Lukin, "The real breakthrough, however, coincided very closely with the moment I started to work with Andrey Mikhailovich Lukin – without him I really might have come to nothing."

Svidler enjoyed multiple breakout performances in 1994. He won the Russian Championship held in Elista with a score of 8/11, and the under-18 section of the World Youth Championship in Szeged, achieving all three of his Grandmaster norms in the process. He debuted for the Russian team at the Chess Olympiad in Moscow, scoring 5.5/8 on the second reserve board. Svidler also won the Linares Anibal Open, running alongside the invitational event, and finished in a five-way tie for first place at the Chigorin Memorial in St. Petersburg. In October 1994, the short-lived Professional Chess Association ranked him world number 165, rated 2542.

In January 1995, Svidler broke into the top 100 players rated by FIDE at number 86 with a rating of 2585. He started with 0/3 at the Vidra Memorial in Haifa but recovered to 6/11 for tied fourth, shared second with 7/9 in April's New York Open, then won the St Petersburg Championship in April. At the Novgorod Open in May–June he scored 6/9 for eighth place on tiebreak. He tied for first place with three players at Novosibirsk. A last round victory against Alexander Morozevich secured his second consecutive Russian Championship on tiebreak from five players with 7.5/11. Svidler rounded off his year placing fourth with 6.5/11 at the strong Groningen Invitational. His success pushed him to 33rd in the world rankings and third strongest junior and 2635 rating.

In 1996, Svidler scored 2.5/5 for fourth place at the Kloosters event in Ter Apel, failed to qualify for the quarter finals of the PCA Rapidplay in April, came fourth with 6.5/11 at Yerevan in May and fifth on tiebreaks with 3.5/7 at Vidra Memorial. At the Tal Blitz Memorial just before the Olympiad, he was mid-table with 9.5/18. His 8.5/11 contribution, including wins in his first four games for Russia, helped win team gold as well as individual bronze on board four at the 32nd Chess Olympiad, but at Fontys Tilburg a couple of losses saw him drop to tenth place on tiebreak with 4.5/11. At Groningen in November, he scored 5.5/11 for seventh place.

Svidler won the Torshavn Open in February 1997, half a point ahead of Ivan Sokolov with 7.5/9, and in March was sixth on tiebreak, with Vladimir Epishin and Valery Loginov scoring 5.5/9 in the St Petersburg Championship, before slipping to eighth place with 5/11 at a closed event in the same city. He came back with team silver and board-three bronze medals at the European Team Championships, England, victorious on tiebreaks. His form continued into the Russian Championship (held as a knockout format) where he won his third title after a long match against Evgeny Bareev, decided after a third pair of tiebreak games. Along the way he defeated Vladimir Malakhov, Ruslan Sherbakov, Semen Dvoirys and Alexey Dreev in the semi-finals. In July–August he tied for second place with 5.5/9 in Bad Homburg.

Svidler was a signatory of a letter published in September which protested the decision of FIDE President Kirsan Ilyumzhinov to change the format of the World Championship. Under the proposals, Anatoly Karpov and Garry Kasparov would be seeded directly to the semi-finals of the FIDE World Chess Championship 1998, Kasparov's refusal to participate meant that Karpov was seeded to the final. The letter also complained about the proposed schedule.

At Fontys Tilburg in October 1997, Svidler's last round win against Alexander Onischuk enabled him to tie for first with Vladimir Kramnik and Kasparov, scoring 8/11. He also defeated an overly ambitious Kasparov—who had started with 5.5/6—in their individual game. This results propelled him to 9th in the PCA rankings. In October at the World Team Championship in Lucerne, Svidler claimed board two gold with 4.5/7 for the gold medallists Russia. At the World Championship in December, Svidler defeated both Utut Adianto and Epishin 1.5–0.5, before taking Michael Adams to rapid tiebreaks in the third round, where he would lose the last three games to crash out of the event. His successes over the past year saw him given fourth place in the Chess Oscars voting, ahead of Karpov but behind winner Anand, Kasparov and Kramnik.

=== Entering FIDE top 10 ===
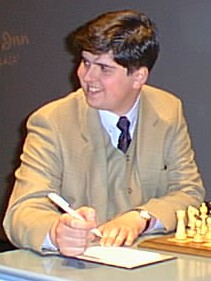
Svidler at Dortmund, June 1998

Svidler entered the FIDE top 10 for the first time in January 1998, at ninth with a rating of 2690. At Linares, with the support of English Grandmaster Nigel Short, he produced a final score of 5.5/12, demonstrating the ability to compete at his new rating bracket. He finished second in Madrid with 5.5/9 in May, a point behind Viswanathan Anand. He lost an exhibition internet blitz match against Kasparov 2–0 immediately after. It was revealed that Kasparov had accidentally played him two days before in a training match online, Kasparov winning 3–1.

He won his last two games to share victory at Dortmund with 6/9. During the tournament it was confirmed that Svidler's rating had risen above 2700 for the first time to 2710. In June he finished a point behind Viktor Korchnoi at Bad Homburg with 6/9 and finished second on tiebreak at the Russian Championship behind Morozevich with 7.5/11. Svidler led Russia to gold at the 33rd Chess Olympiad, winning the event in the last round with a 3.5–0.5 defeat of the Netherlands, pushing the United States into silver. Soon after he finished eighth at Tilburg with 5/11, then came third at the Wydra Memorial Rapid, well behind Anand and Judit Polgar.

In January 1999, Svidler participated in the Hoogovens Tournament, finishing in ninth place in the Group A main event and in a tie for sixth place in the blitz, with scores of 6.5/13 in both events. He lost five games in Linares to finish a disappointing seventh with 5.5/13, then scored 3.5/9 for ninth on tiebreak at Dos Hermanas in April. In early June, Nigel Short introduced Svidler to cricket, of which Svidler would become an avid fan, especially of the England national team.

At Frankfurt in June–July, Svidler came fourth in the West Masters with 7.5/14 and fifteenth on tiebreak in the Ordix Open (both rapid events). Seeded to round two, he defeated Alexej Alexandrov 1.5–0.5 but lost to Kiril Georgiev by the same score. In November, he drew an internet rapid match with Morozevich 1–1. Svidler rounded off his year with third place at the St. Petersburg Blitz Championship.

Svidler placed tenth on tiebreak at the World Blitz Cup with 16.5/22 in January 2000, came third on tiebreak at the Wydra Rapidplay with 9/14, before being beaten by Jeroen Piket 1.5–0.5 in the semi-final of the Kasparovchess Grand Prix. he came third at the Ordix Open with 11.5/15, scored 15/16 in a simul in Mainz, and shared first scoring 6.5/9 with Mikhail Gurevich at July's North Sea Open, Svidler dominated at Biel Chess Festival, finishing two points ahead of joint runners-up Loek van Wely and Ruslan Ponomariov, followed by Boris Gelfand, before his form collapsed with 3.5/9 at Polanica Zdroj, Rubinstein Memorial in August (Gelfand won). After tying for second place in the C group of the preliminary stage of the 1st FIDE World Cup, held in Shenyang, Svidler was eliminated after losing a sudden death tiebreak game against Movsesian. He won the Abihome rapid with 9.5/10 in October, before joining Kramnik's team facing Kasparov at the Classical World Championship match in London. He scored 4.5/8 on board three for the gold-medallist Olympiad team in Istanbul, then competed at the FIDE World Championship, eliminated in rapid tiebreaks by Michael Adams in the third round. He finished second with 4.5/7 at December's Keres Memorial Rapid, a point behind Jan Timman.

At the Rapid World Cup in March 2001 Svidler was eliminated at the group stage, finishing fourth in Group A, qualified from the group stage of the Viktor Korchnoi 70th Anniversary Tournament but was knocked out in the quarter finals by Piket. He came 11th with 8.5/11 in the Ordix Open, second at Biel, half a point behind Korchnoi, second at Moscow's Lightning event, competed in the China-Russia Summit and won team silver and board one bronze at the World Team Championship. Svidler reached the semifinals of the World Championship 2002, after defeating along the way Alejandro Hoffman, Sarunas Sulkis, Vadim Milov, Michael Adams and Boris Gelfand. He was eliminated by eventual winner Ruslan Ponomariov after losing the third game.

After Svidler played in the World Cup (a rapid knockout event) and Eurotel Knockout, an open letter was published with Svidler's signature decrying the proposed "Prague Agreement" in which it argued "most of the top chess professionals will have no opportunity to take part in the World Championship until 2005" and called for the establishment of a Grandmasters' Committee as previously agreed. He then competed at the Moscow (rapid) Grand Prix, tied for second at the Ordix Open, won the Chess960 section and won a two-game handicap match against Junior 7 and Eckhard Freise, and tied for third at the Moscow Blitz Championship. In the "Match of the New Century" between Russia and Rest of the World he scored 5/9, losing to Anand and Teimour Radjabov, He took in a tied Moscow–Saint Petersburg match before competing in the Chess Olympiad scoring 6/9 for team gold. He tied for second, half a point behind Igor Khenkin, at Santo Domingo in December with 7/9.

In January 2003, Svidler finished second behind Giovanni Vescovi with 7.5/11 at the Bermuda A Group before tying for first at Aeroflot, the invitation to Dortmund going to tiebreak winner Victor Bologan. He won the 4th Karpov tournament in Poikovsky on tiebreak with Joël Lautier with 6/9. He defeated Konstantin Chernyshov 2.5-1.5 in a standard match and 3–1 in a rapid match in Voronezh. Svidler's surge in form saw him climb to 8th place in the FIDE rankings. At the Mainz Chess Classic in August, he won an eight-game Chess960 match against Peter Leko 4.5–3.5. Svidler claimed his fourth Russian Championship in September on tiebreak over Morozevich, scoring 7/9 and scored 5/8 for Russia winning the European Team Championship, ahead of Israel. At Cap d'Agde rapid in October, he won the qualifying Group A with 5/7. After beating Topalov, he lost a blitz playoff against Anand in the semi-finals.

Svidler started 2004 fourth in the FIDE rankings and subsequently voted second in the Chess Oscar behind Anand, but slipped to ninth after tiebreak at Corus Group A scoring 6/13, then came seventh and fourth respectively in the Amber Blindfold and Rapid sections. He lost to Alexei Shirov in the final of the Leon knockout 3.5-0.5, scored 4/6 for the Rest of World against Armenia and came third at Dortmund after coming second in group A, losing to Kramnik after a long tiebreak semi-final but defeating Leko. He defended his Mainz Chess960 title in August against Aronian 4.5-3.5. He seconded Kramnik during his successful World Championship defence against Leko in September then played at the Olympiad in Calvia, winning team silver and scoring 6.5/9 on board two. He took sixth place on tiebreak at the Russian Championship in November. He ended the year with second on tiebreak at the Konstantin Aseev Memorial rapid and playing for third placed Russia in the Petrosian Internet Memorial.

At Corus in January 2005, after a difficult start Svidler recovered to 11th with 6/13 before placing a solid fifth with 5/9 at Poikovsky. At Amber, he came seventh in both Rapid and Blindfold sections. In July, Svidler finished fifth on tiebreak at Dortmund after tying with Topalov, Bacrot and van Wely on 5/9. Russia disappointed at the European Team Championships in August, drifting to 14th. Svidler scored 5.5/8 for board one silver medal before successfully defending his Mainz Chess960 title against Zoltán Almási 5–3.

=== World Championship 2005 ===
At the FIDE World Chess Championship 2005 held in San Luis, Argentina between September and October, Svidler placed shared second with Anand (third on number of wins tiebreak) scoring 8½/14 games, 1½ points behind the winner, Veselin Topalov. Alexander Motylev acted as his second. Shortly after the tournament Svidler said: "I only prepared seriously for San Luis, and I think it has paid off. But in general I spend most of my spare time with my wife and kids, so my relative success in 2005 was a pleasant surprise." Crushing China in the last round secured Svidler-led Russia gold at the World Team Championship. He came sixth on tiebreak at the Russian Superfinal. His success in 2005 earned him fourth place in the Chess Oscar voting.

Svidler followed third place in the Moscow Superblitz in January 2006 before slipping in the final rounds to sixth place on tiebreak with 6.5/14 at Morelia-Linares. His form collapsed at Amber in March finishing last in the Rapid and sixth on tiebreak in the Blindfold, and put in solid performances in Mtel Masters and Olympiad held in May. After a short rest, Svidler returned to strength with second on tiebreak at Dortmund with 4.5/7, Kramnik catching him in the last round . He was defeated 5–3 by Aronian in the Mainz Chess 960 match after losing the last two games but beat Magnus Carlsen 1.5–0.5 in Spitsbergen. Svidler lost an armageddon play-off game against Alexander Grischuk at the World Blitz Championship in September, after tying on 10.5/15.

In October 2006 Svidler visited Kramnik during the World Championship match in Elista and released a joint open letter with Evgeny Bareev protesting against the handling of the controversy and calling for the dismissal of FIDE Vice-presidents Georgios Makropoulos and Zurab Azmaiparashvili, who sat on the Appeals Committee at the event. He scored 4.5/9 for seventh place on tiebreak at the Tal Memorial and fourth in the Blitz event in November. He finished fourth at the Russian Superfinal in December with 6.5/11. His poor results since September dropped him from fourth to 12th in the world.

In January 2007, Svidler lost his last two games to finish sixth at Corus with 7/13. Losing against Morozevich in the last round cost Svidler a share of second place at Morelia-Linares, instead placing fifth on tiebreak with 7/14, then took overall fourth on tiebreak at Amber in March (seventh in Rapid, fifth on tiebreak in Blindfold). At Aerosvit in June he finished fourth on tiebreak with a solid 6/11

Svidler's third place in San Luis two years before earned him a place in the next World Championship, held in Mexico City in September 2007. Struggling with losses in rounds three and five, he came back to win in the last round, scoring 6.5/14 for fifth place. He said in an interview that although he prepared deeply for the event he was "hugely disappointed". Svidler's 6/7 on first board regained the European Team Championship for Russia as well as individual gold. At the Chess World Cup he defeated both Eduardo Iturrizaga and Dusko Pavasovic 2–0, Rublevsky 2.5–1.5 before losing to Gata Kamsky by the same score. He finished ninth at the Russian Superfinal in December after losing to Evgeny Tomashevsky and Morozevich, on 5/11.

In 2008 Svidler lost to Grischuk in the quarter finals of the ACP World Rapid Cup. He won at Bunratty in February with 5.5/6, half a point ahead of Alexander Baburin. Svidler finished seventh in the inaugural FIDE Grand Prix event in Baku (invited as presidential nominee) between April–May with 6.5/13 and ninth on tiebreak with 5/11 at Aerosvit. He rebounded after a poor start in the second Grand Prix event held in Sochi in August, winning his last three games, to finish fifth on tiebreak with 7/13. He came fourth on tiebreak at the Tal Memorial Blitz, before playing in the China–Russia Summit and Russian Superfinal. He won his fifth Russian Championship after a play-off with Jakovenko and Evgeny Alekseev, having scored 7/9 in the main event. He tied with Grischuk for third at the World Blitz Championship in November, played in the Dresden Chess Olympiad and ended the year with fourth place, scoring 4.5/10, at Nanjing's Pearl Spring event.

Entering 2009, Svidler defeated Carlsen in the Aker Chess Challenge final before winning the Gibraltar Masters after a play-off match against Milov, having tied on 8/10. His participation in Gibraltar instead of Tata Steel was secured after organisers offered him a session at the local cricket nets. He successfully defended his Bunratty title scoring 5.5/6, but fell well out of contention at the Aeroflot Blitz, placing 47th. He finished tenth on tiebreak in the Nalchik Grand Prix scoring 6/13. Svidler defeated Karpov, Movsesian and Grischuk on the way to the ACP Rapid Cup final in May, losing to Gelfand 3–1, though he had decisive chances in two games. In July he came third in Donostia Chess Festival with 5.5/9, behind Hikaru Nakamura and Ponomariov. Svidler scored 6/10 for the "Experience" team as they defeated the "Rising Stars" in a Scheveningen match held in Amsterdam in August. Svidler scored 5/7 to win team silver at the European Team Championships in Novi Sad in October, stumbled to 3.5/9 and eighth place at the Tal Memorial, though he finished sixth at the World Blitz Championship in November. Soon after, he knocked Jean Hebert, Tomi Nyback, Arkadij Naiditsch and Shirov before being eliminated by Vladimir Malakhov in the quarter finals of the Chess World Cup 2009. He finished second behind Grischuk at the year-ending Russian Superfinal, scoring 6/9.

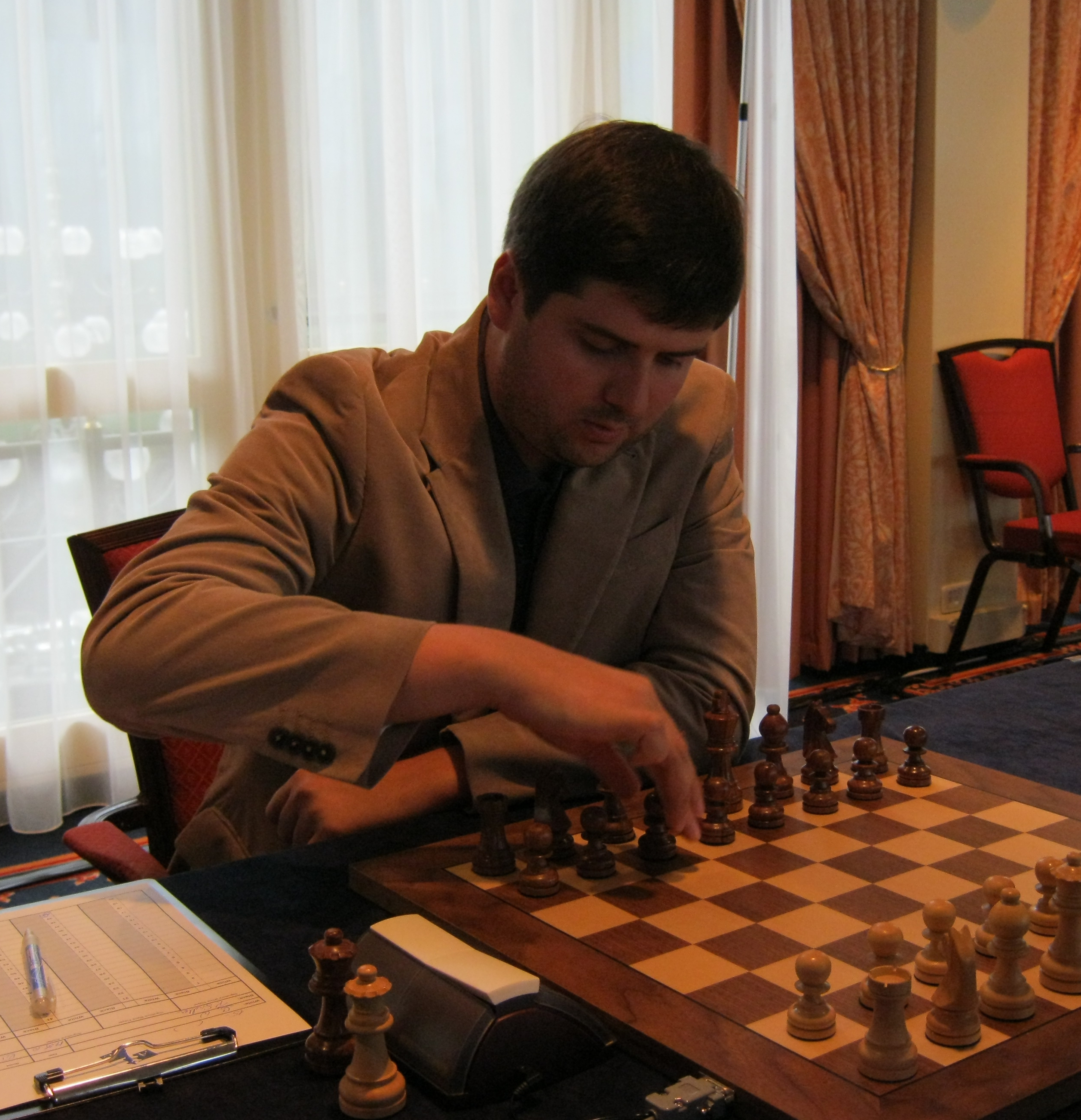
Svidler in 2010

2010 was a much quieter year for Svidler with eighth place at Amber (5.5/11 Blindfold, 6/11 Rapid). At the Astrakhan Grand Prix held in May, Svidler came 11th with 6/13. He won matches against Peter Heine Nielsen, 4.5–1.5 at rapid, 7–3 blitz (1.b3 the starting position), then drew 5–5 at regular blitz as part of the Politiken Cup in August. He scored 5.5/10 for the losing "Experienced" team at NH Chess Tournament, then led Russia to team silver at the Chess Olympiad. In November, Svidler finished ninth in the World Blitz Championship with 19.5/38. Svidler ended the year with fourth place on tiebreak in the Russian Superfinal.

Svidler came eighth on tiebreak at the European Individual Championship in March 2011 with 8/11, half a point behind winner Vladimir Potkin. At the World Team Championships in July Russia slipped to fourth place after losing to India in the last round, Svidler losing to Surya Shekhar Ganguly on board three. In a shortened Russian Championship in August Svidler won his sixth title with 5/7, though he lost his last game against Morozevich.

=== World Cup 2011 winner ===
At the Chess World Cup held in September in Khanty-Mansiysk, Svidler beat Darcy Lima 1.5–0.5, Ngoc Truong Son Nguyen 4–2 after blitz tiebreaks, Fabiano Caruana 4–2 after rapid tiebreaks, Kamsky 2–0, and then Judit Polgar 1.5–0.5 to reach the semi-finals. After avenging his 2001 World Championship loss against Ponomariov 1.5–0.5, he defeated Grischuk in the final 2.5–1.5 to claim the World Cup title. Svidler struggled at the European Team Championships in November, scoring 3.5/8 as Russia finished fifth. He came seventh in the Tal Memorial with 4,5/9.

Svidler finished 12th at the Gibraltar Masters in January–February 2012, part of a 17-player group on 7/10, then defeated David Navara 3–1 in a Cez Trophy match held in Prague in June. In July's World Rapid and Blitz Championships held in Astana, Svidler finished eighth in both sections scoring 7.5/15 and 15/30 respectively. At the Russian Superfinal in August, Svidler shared first place with five other players on 5/9 after defeating Grischuk in the final round, leading to a play-off round-robin (25m+10s games). He placed third, behind winner Dmitry Andreikin and Karjakin. In October he was pipped to first place at the St Petersburg Rapid Cup by Lenier Dominguez Perez on tiebreak, both having tied on 7.5/11. He ended the year with solid 5.5/11 for eighth place at the FIDE Grand Prix in Tashkent.

In February 2013, Svidler came second in the Aeroflot Blitz and fifth in the Rapid. Svidler played in the 2013 Candidates Tournament in London from 15 March to 1 April, having qualified as winner of the World Cup in 2011. He finished third with 8/14, winning against Radjabov, Aronian, Ivanchuk and in a dramatic last round, Carlsen, which led to his rating rising to a record 2769. Although he finished in last place with 3/9 at the Alekhine Memorial, he recovered with 5/9 for fourth place at Norway Chess—a late replacement for Kramnik—scoring 5.5/9 for fifth place in the Blitz event. At June's FIDE Grand Prix in Thessaloniki, Svidler came ninth on tiebreak with 4.5/11. In August he competed in the 2013 World Cup. He defeated Anna Ushenina 3–1 after rapid tiebreaks, Bologan 2.5–1.5 after rapid tiebreaks and Radjabov 1.5–0.5, before being knocked out by eventual finalist Andreikin 2.5–1.5 after rapid tiebreaks. He reached the semi-finals of the ACP Rapid Cup in September, losing to Grischuk, then won his seventh Russian Championship in October after winning a rapid tiebreak match against Ian Nepomniachtchi 1.5–0.5, having scored 6.5/8 in the main event. He won team bronze at the European Team Championships in November. At the 5th London Chess Classic in December, held in a qualifying group then knockout format, Svidler qualified top of Group B but was knocked out in the first round by Adams 3–1.

Svidler finished seventh at the 2014 Candidates Tournament in March. He scored 6.5/14 and won games against Kramnik, Andreikin and Topalov. He took part in Norway Chess in June, coming fifth in the Blitz with 5/9 and seventh with 4/9 in the main event. At the World Rapid and Blitz Championships the same month, Svidler came tenth with 10/15 in the Rapid and eleventh with 13/21 in the Blitz. In July, he defeated Gelfand in a rapid match 5–3 as part of the Gideon Japhet Memorial held in Jerusalem. In October he finished seventh on tiebreak with 6/11 at the FIDE Grand Prix held in Baku. Svidler finished sixth with 12/22 at the Tal Memorial Blitz in November, before coming fifth on tiebreak, scoring 4.5/9, at the Russian Superfinal.

=== World Cup 2015 finalist ===
Although he was one of the strongest players at the Gibraltar Masters in 2015, Svidler slipped to twelfth place scoring 7/10 and slumped to eleventh place at the FIDE Grand Prix in Tbilisi, scoring 4.5/11. In May he scored 5.5/11 at the FIDE Grand Prix held in Khanty-Mansiysk for sixth place on tiebreak. He scored 3/5 at the China-Russia Summit in July and came ninth with 5/11 in the Russian Superfinal. He played at the St Petersburg Summer Rapid, finishing in tenth place.

Svidler reached the final of Chess World Cup 2015 in Baku having defeated Emre Can 1.5–0.5, Liviu-Dieter Nisipeanu 3.5–2.5 after tiebreaks, Radjabov 2.5–1.5 after tiebreaks, top-seeded Veselin Topalov 1.5–0.5, Chinese prodigy Wei Yi, 3.5–2.5 after tiebreaks, and Anish Giri 1.5–0.5 in the semi-finals. He won the first two games against compatriot Sergey Karjakin but dramatically lost the remaining two games, forcing a tiebreak match, formed of mini-matches of shortening time control. Advantage switched between the players but eventually at the blitz time control (5 minutes + 2 seconds per move) Karjakin won both games to take the title. However, having reached the final, Svidler qualified for the 2016 Candidates Tournament.

At the World Rapid and Blitz Championships in Berlin in October 2015 he finished 34th in the Rapid and seventh on tiebreak in the Blitz. He ended his year with team victory at the European Team Championship held in Reykjavik in November.

Svidler came seventh on tiebreak at the 2016 Paul Keres Memorial scoring 8/11, before competing at the Candidates Tournament in March. Svidler failed to convert several promising positions and finished fourth out of eight players with 7/14. He lost with Black against Anand in round 6 but defeated Aronian with the same colour in round 11.

In June, Svidler came sixth at the Eurasian Blitz Cup in Almaty. Svidler lost a mixed time control match in Biel against Maxime Vachier-Lagrave 1.5–2.5 in rapid and 1–3 in classical games. During the match Svidler was announced as replacement for Kramnik at the Sinquefield Cup. After overcoming visa difficulties, he struggled to ninth place with 3.5/9.

Svidler served as second to Kirill Alekseenko during the Candidates Tournament 2020 and as second to Praggnanandhaa in the Candidates Tournament 2024.

== Team Results ==
=== Chess Olympiads ===
Olympiad	Board	Individual result	Team result
Moscow 1994	2nd reserve	5.5/8 (7th)	Gold
Yerevan 1996	Fourth	8.5/11 (Bronze)	Gold
Elista 1998	First	5.5/9 (18th)	Gold
Istanbul 2000	Third	4.5/8	Gold
Bled 2002	Reserve	6/9 (18th)	Gold
Calvia 2004	Second	6.5/9 (5th)	Silver
Turin 2006	Second	5/9 (42nd)	6th
Dresden 2008	Second	4.5/9 (16th)	5th
Khanty-Mansiysk 2010	Third	5.5/10 (7th)	Silver
Tromsø 2014	Third	4/8 (33rd)	4th

=== Other International Team Championships ===
Svidler competed in World and European Team Championships (ETCC) with results as follows:

Event	Board	Individual result	Team result
11th ETCC, Pula 1997	Second	6/9 (Bronze)	Silver
4th WTCC, Lucerne 1997	Second	4.5/7 (Gold)	Gold
5th WTCC, Yerevan 2001	First	4.5/8 (Third)	Silver
14th ETCC, Plovdiv 2003	First	5/8 (6th)	Gold
15th ETCC, Gothenburg 2005	First	5.5/8 (Silver)	14th
6th WTCC, Beersheva 2005	First	5/7 (Gold)	Gold
16th ETCC, Heraklion 2007	First	6/7 (Gold)	Gold
17th ETCC, Novi Sad 2009	First	5/8 (6th)	Silver
18th ETCC, Porto Carras 2011	First	3.5/8 (16th)	5th
8th WTCC, Ningbo 2011	Fourth	3.5/7 (6th)	4th
19th ETCC, Warsaw 2013	Second	6.5/9 (Silver)	Bronze
20th ETCC, Reykjavik 2015	First	5/8 (4th)	Gold
9th WTCC, Khanty-Mansiysk 2017	First	3/6 (6th)	Silver

=== Club results ===
Svidler played in the European Chess Club Cup 20 times between 1995–2003 and 2006–2016, winning with Ladya in 1997, Paris NAO in 2003 and Saint Petersburg in 2011. Second-placed with Chigorin St Petersburg in 2000, Baden-Baden in 2008, Saint Petersburg in 2012 and Mednyi Vsadnik (from Saint Petersburg) in 2016, he won individual silver for board two in 2003 and board one in 2009, and bronze for board two in 2000.

A frequent Russian club player, he competed 16 times, on all but two occasions for Saint Petersburg winning four times, placing second twice, and placing third seven times. He won individual gold for first board in 2000, 2001 and 2005, silver for board two in 1996 and 2011 and bronze for board one in 2009 and 2015.

In Germany's Bundesliga, Svidler lost with Baden-Baden in the play-off in May 2004, but he won every season from 2005/06 up to and including 2014/15. He also won the German Team Cup in 2003 and 2005.

He won the French Team Championship with Paris NAO in 2003, 2004, 2005 and 2006. Svidler won the league in 2009 with Évry Grand Roque and came second in 2010.

Svidler played in the 2001 Four Nations Chess League final, losing to Morozevich, but his team took the title. He also played in the 2002–03 Belgian Team Championships.

== Personal life ==
Svidler is married and has two sons. Outside of chess, he is a fan of cricket and is a supporter of the England cricket team.

Together with 43 other Russian elite chess players, Svidler signed an open letter to Russian president Vladimir Putin, protesting against the 2022 Russian invasion of Ukraine and expressing solidarity with the Ukrainian people.

Svidler was a frequent commentator on important chess tournaments and matches on the chess website Chess24. He received praise for his real-time online analysis and solo post-game summaries of the 2018 World Chess Championship final.

Sporting positions
Preceded by Alexei Bezgodov	Russian Chess Champion; 1994, 1995	Succeeded by Alexander Khalifman
Preceded by Alexander Khalifman	Russian Chess Champion; 1997	Succeeded by Alexander Morozevich
Preceded by Alexander Lastin	Russian Chess Champion; 2003	Succeeded by Garry Kasparov
Preceded by Alexander Morozevich	Russian Chess Champion; 2008	Succeeded by Alexander Grischuk
Preceded by Ian Nepomniachtchi	Russian Chess Champion; 2011	Succeeded by Dmitry Andreikin
Preceded by Dmitry Andreikin	Russian Chess Champion; 2013	Succeeded by Igor Lysyj
Preceded by Alexander Riazantsev	Russian Chess Champion; 2017	Succeeded by Dmitry Andreikin
