= World Chess Championship 2000 =

Two rival world chess championships were held in the year 2000:

- Classical World Chess Championship 2000, a match between challenger Vladimir Kramnik and defending champion Garry Kasparov.
- FIDE World Chess Championship 2000, a knockout tournament that took place in New Delhi, India and Tehran, Iran.
