= FIDE World Chess Championships (1998–2004) =

Series of chess championships with distinct format

The FIDE World Chess Championships from 1998 to 2004 followed a similar knockout format, radically different from previous World Chess Championship events. Previous events had had long qualifying cycles, spread over more than a year, culminating in a long match (best of 20 or 24 games) between the incumbent champion and a challenger. From 1998 to 2004, however, FIDE organised its World Championship as a single event over about a month, with many players playing short knockout matches, rather in the style of a tennis tournament such as Wimbledon.

== Background ==
From 1948 to 1993, the world chess championship had been administered by FIDE, the international chess federation. In 1993, the World Chess Champion Garry Kasparov split from FIDE and formed a rival organisation, the Professional Chess Association. FIDE stripped Kasparov of his title, meaning there were now two rival championships: the FIDE title, held by Anatoly Karpov, and the PCA title, held by Kasparov. Karpov and Kasparov had successfully defended their titles at the FIDE World Chess Championship 1996 and PCA World Chess Championship 1995 respectively.

From 1948 until 1996, World Chess Championships had followed a similar pattern: a series of qualifying tournaments and matches were held over more than a year, culminating in the Candidates Tournament. The winner of the Candidates tournament was the official challenger for the world title and would play the incumbent champion in a match for the world championship. (The 1996 cycle was an exception. The incumbent world champion participated in the Candidates tournament as a seeded semi-finalist.)

In 1997, FIDE president Kirsan Ilyumzhinov proposed a completely new structure: a knockout tournament, consisting of two game matches (slightly longer in the final rounds), with match tie-breakers using rapid chess and blitz chess if necessary. This format had been done before in tournaments, but never at the world championship level.

== Controversies ==
The advantages of the new format were:

- It avoided a long cycle and was all over in a month or so. This is could all be done in the one venue, it would not have the scheduling problems which had beset some previous world championship cycles. Each round could be played in 3 days (one day for each normal time control game, and one for the tie breaks).
- More players (up to 128) could be included.
- There were no special privileges for the incumbent champion or seeded players (although some were preserved in the earlier championships, these were completely eliminated later on).

Opponents pointed out the disadvantages of the format:

- Short matches (only two games in the earlier rounds) left too much to chance - the stronger player could blunder a game, and it would be difficult to recover from a bad start. (Many world championship and Candidates matches had been won by the player who recovered from an early loss).
- The rapid playoffs were also seen to be left too much to chance: strength in rapid chess is not the same as strength in chess with normal time controls.
- These first two considerations, taken together, meant there was a very high chance that the best player would not win, or even that a complete outsider might win, opponents argued.
- Some people felt that the tradition of the champion being seeded into the final should be preserved so that a new champion can only be champion by defeating the old champion.

In declining to participate, Garry Kasparov wrote, "In Chess, the tradition of playing for the official WORLD TITLE is 111 years old and recognises the age-old tradition of a match between the HOLDER of the title and the CHALLENGER. Tradition dictates that this challenge is made in a serious manner with a full series of matches. The format being suggested flies directly in the face of tradition and unfortunately trivialises the World Title."

Despite winning the first event, Anatoly Karpov expressed his unhappiness with the use of rapid tiebreaks, comparing it to using a 100 metre race as a tiebreak for a marathon.

=== Prominent non-participants ===
- Kasparov, holder of the rival PCA/Classical World title until 2000, did not recognise the FIDE title and did not play in any of five events.
- Likewise Vladimir Kramnik, after winning Kasparov's title in 2000, did not play in the FIDE events after 2000.
- In 1997-98, Kramnik declined for a different reason, in protest against Karpov being seeded into the final.
- In 1999 Karpov declined to play because the FIDE champion had always been seeded into the final or semi-final, but he was required to enter at the second round. Karpov didn't play in subsequent events either, but by then he was semi-retired from top-level chess.
- In 1999, Anand did not play because he was expecting to play a match against Kasparov for the Classical World Chess Championship 2000 - a match which did not eventuate.
- A number of players refused to play in 2004 due to it being in Libya. See FIDE World Chess Championship 2004

== History ==
=== FIDE World Chess Championship 1998 ===
The first knockout tournament was held at the end of 1997. In addition to the new format, it was proposed by Ilyumzhinov as a way to unify the two rival world titles. To do this, FIDE champion Karpov and PCA champion Kasparov were each to be seeded into the semi-finals.

Kasparov did not want to defend his title under these circumstances and declined his invitation.

The format was then modified to have FIDE champion Karpov seeded directly into the final.

All of the tournament except the final was held in Groningen in December 1997. Of the 97 remaining participants, 68 entered the tournament in the first round, 28 in the second round and 1 (Gelfand, loser from Round 3 of the previous Candidates match) in the third round. The first six rounds consisted of two normal time control games, plus tiebreaks. The seventh-round consisted of four normal time control games, plus tiebreaks.

The seventh-round was between Viswanathan Anand and Michael Adams, and was won by Anand.

Anand then played Karpov in the final in January 1998. The final was best of 6 normal time control games, and this was drawn 3-3. Karpov then won the rapid playoff, becoming the 1998 FIDE World Chess Champion.

There were criticisms that Anand never really had a chance because Karpov was much fresher than Anand, who had only three days between his match with Adams and the match with Karpov, while Karpov automatically qualified for the final.

=== FIDE World Chess Championship 1999 ===
The 1999 tournament was held in Las Vegas, in July and August 1999. Karpov was not seeded into the final and refused to participate.

Kasparov again refused to take part, and famously said that most of the participants were "tourists".

The event was won by Alexander Khalifman.

Khalifman was rated 44th in the world at the time, which some compared unfavourably to PCA champion Kasparov being rated #1. Khalifman said after the tournament, "Rating system works perfectly for players who play only in round-robin closed events. I think most of them are overrated. Organizers invite same people over and over because they have the same rating and their rating stays high." Perhaps in response, Khalifman was invited to the next Linares chess tournament, and performed creditably (though placing below joint winner Kasparov).

=== FIDE World Chess Championship 2000 ===
This event was played in November–December 2000. Vladimir Kramnik had recently defeated Kasparov for Kasparov's world title (see Classical World Chess Championship 2000), and neither of these players took part.

The event was won in convincing fashion by Anand, who only had to rely on a rapid playoff once. This was the first time the top-rated player had won the event (in 1997–98 Anand was top-rated, followed by Karpov).

=== FIDE World Chess Championship 2002 ===
This event was won by Ruslan Ponomariov.

=== FIDE World Chess Championship 2004 ===
The event was won by Rustam Kasimdzhanov.

== Change of the format ==
FIDE abandoned the knockout format in 2005, instead running the FIDE World Chess Championship 2005 as an 8 player, double round-robin tournament.

However, FIDE still held a 2005 knockout tournament called the "FIDE World Cup", as the first stage of qualification for the FIDE World Chess Championship 2007. It roughly fills the place of the old Interzonal tournaments, with the top 10 placegetters qualifying for the 2007 Candidates Tournament.

== Aftermath ==
The world championship was eventually reunified in 2006, when classical champion Vladimir Kramnik (who had defeated Garry Kasparov in 2000) defeated the winner of the FIDE World Chess Championship 2005, Veselin Topalov. Since then the championship has been decided, as before, in a final match between the defending champion and a challenger decided by the Candidates Tournament.
