= FIDE World Chess Championship 2005 =

Match in Potrero de los Funes, Argentina

World Chess Championship 2005
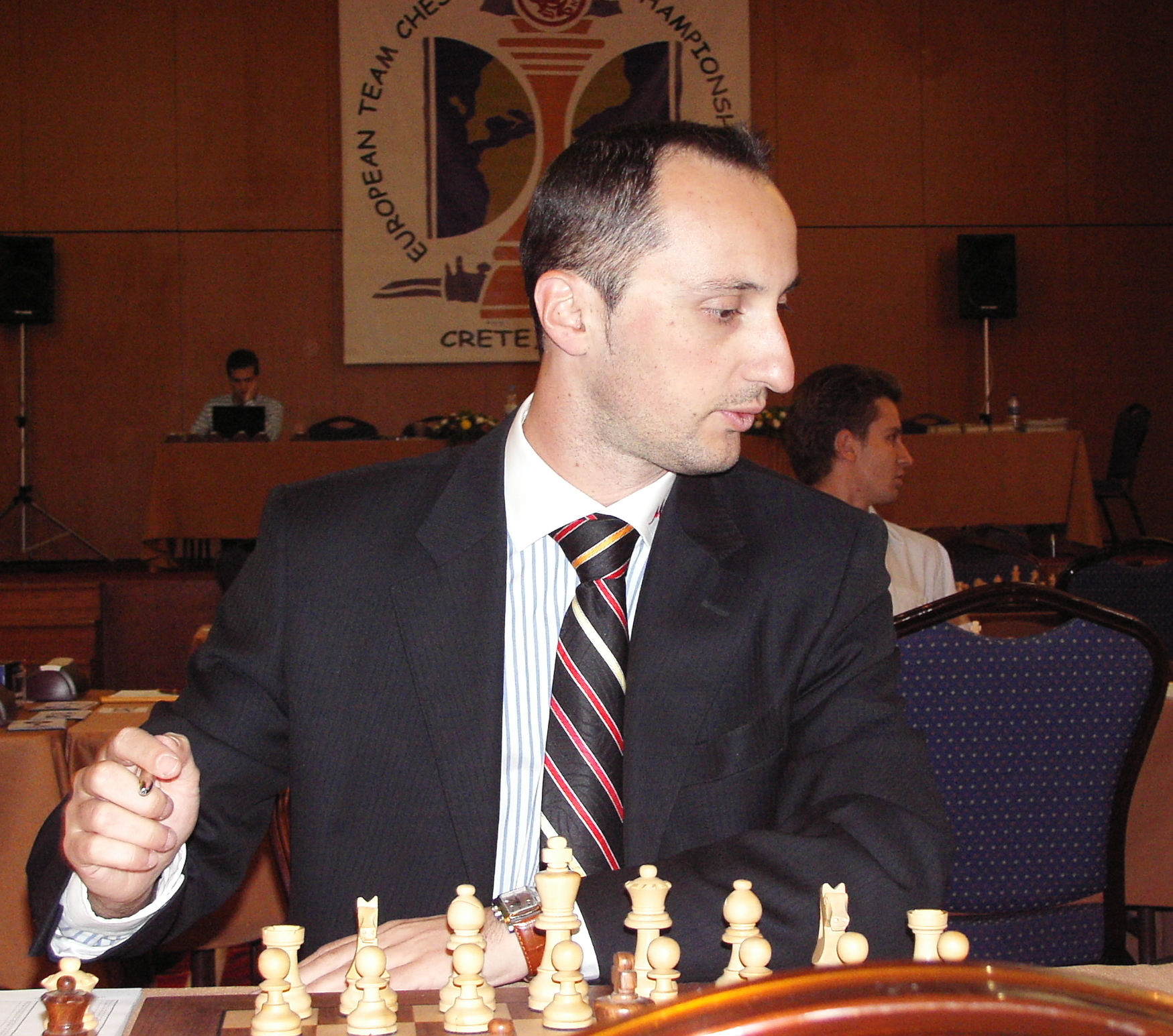
- Veselin Topalov of Bulgaria, winner of the FIDE World Chess Championship 2005.
- Location: Potrero de los Funes, Argentina
- Dates: 27 September–16 October 2005
- Competitors: 8 from 6 nations
- Winning score: 10 points of 14

Champion
- (Bulgaria) Veselin Topalov

The FIDE World Chess Championship 2005 took place in Potrero de los Funes, San Luis Province in Argentina from September 27 to October 16, 2005. It was won by Veselin Topalov.

== Background ==
In the face of criticism of the knockout FIDE World Chess Championships held from 1998 to 2004, FIDE (the World Chess Federation) made changes for its World Chess Championship in 2005. It used normal (slow) time controls (unlike the 2002 and 2004 knockout tournaments), and changed the format to an eight-player, double round-robin event, where every player plays every other player twice, once with each colour.

The players invited were:

- The finalists from the previous (2004) FIDE World Championship: Rustam Kasimdzhanov, and Michael Adams;
- Classical World Champion Vladimir Kramnik, and his most recent challenger, Péter Lékó;
- The next four top-rated players, from the average of the July 2004 and January 2005 lists: Garry Kasparov, Viswanathan Anand, Veselin Topalov and Alexander Morozevich.

Kramnik refused to play (see Aftermath section below), as did the recently retired Kasparov. Their places were taken by the next two players on the FIDE rating list: Peter Svidler and Judit Polgár. Polgár's participation made the FIDE World Chess Championship 2005 the first and so far only (as of 2026) small-scale World Chess Championship (Note: not only the final duel between Champion and challenger but also including the final contest to determine the challenger - the Candidates Tournament) to have involved a female player. (Note: Judit Polgár had previously played in World Chess Championships where the title was decided by knockout matches. Those championships however involved over a hundred players.)

The opening ceremony took place on September 27, the matches started on September 28, and the closing ceremony took place on October 16.

== Results ==
FIDE World Chess Championship 2005
		Age	Rating^{1}	Performance	Rank	TOP	ANA	SVI	MOR	LEK	KAS	ADA	POL	Total
1	Veselin Topalov (Bulgaria)	30	2788	(+102)	3	-	½ ½	1 ½	1 ½	1 ½	1 ½	1 ½	1 ½	10
2	Viswanathan Anand (India)	35	2788	(+19)	2	½ ½	-	½ ½	0 ½	½ 1	0 1	1 ½	1 1	8½
3	Peter Svidler (Russia)	29	2738	(+76)	7	0 ½	½ ½	-	1 1	1 ½	½ ½	½ ½	1 ½	8½
4	Alexander Morozevich (Russia)	28	2707	(+36)	14	0 ½	1 ½	0 0	-	½ 1	½ 1	½ ½	½ ½	7
5	Peter Leko (Hungary)	26	2763	(-52)	4	0 ½	½ 0	0 ½	½ 0	-	½ 1	1 ½	1 ½	6½
6	Rustam Kasimdzhanov (Uzbekistan)	25	2670	(+2)	35	0 ½	1 0	½ ½	½ 0	½ 0	-	½ ½	0 1	5½
7	Michael Adams (England)	33	2719	(-53)	13	0 ½	0 ½	½ ½	½ ½	0 ½	½ ½	-	½ ½	5½
8	Judit Polgár (Hungary)	29	2735	(-125)	8	0 ½	0 0	0 ½	½ ½	0 ½	1 0	½ ½	-	4½

- ^{1} Ratings are as at the time of the tournament.

The first tie-break was head-to-head result; the second tie-break was total number of wins.

Topalov scored an extraordinary 6½/7 in the first cycle, one of the greatest streaks in the history of championship-level chess, beating all but Viswanathan Anand, after Anand defended tenaciously in a lost queen-pawn ending. He then drew every one of his games in the second cycle, clinching the victory with one round to spare. This made Topalov the FIDE World Chess Champion.

=== Points by round ===
For each player, the difference between wins and losses after each round is shown. The players with the highest difference for each round are marked with green background.

Final place	Player \ Round	1	2	3	4	5	6	7	8	9	10	11	12	13	14
1	Veselin Topalov (BUL)	+1	+1	+2	+3	+4	+5	+6	+6	+6	+6	+6	+6	+6	+6
2	Viswanathan Anand (IND)	+1	+1	+2	+1	+1	+1	=	+1	+1	+1	+2	+3	+3	+3
3	Peter Svidler (RUS)	=	=	+1	+2	+1	+1	+2	+2	+2	+2	+3	+3	+3	+3
4	Alexander Morozevich (RUS)	=	=	−1	−2	−2	−2	−1	=	+1	+1	=	=	=	=
5	Peter Leko (HUN)	−1	−1	−2	−1	−1	−1	=	=	−1	−1	−1	−2	−2	−1
6	Rustam Kasimdzhanov (UZB)	=	=	−1	=	=	=	−1	−2	−2	−1	−2	−2	−2	−3
7	Michael Adams (ENG)	=	=	−1	−2	−2	−2	−3	−3	−3	−3	−3	−3	−3	−3
8	Judit Polgár (HUN)	−1	−1	=	−1	−1	−2	−3	−4	−4	−5	−5	−5	−5	−5

== Aftermath ==
FIDE declared before the tournament that they would regard whoever won as World Chess Champion. However, the non-participation of "Classical" World Champion Vladimir Kramnik meant that there were still two competing claimants to World Champion: FIDE Champion Topalov, and "Classical" Champion Kramnik.

Kramnik announced before the tournament that he should not be required to compete; but that as part of the "Prague Agreement", his defense of his title in the Classical World Chess Championship 2004 entitled him to direct entry to a match against the FIDE World Champion for the unified world title. After the tournament, he expressed his willingness to play such a match against Topalov.

Although Topalov initially declined Kramnik's offer, he later acceded. The two contested the FIDE World Chess Championship 2006 to reunify the title, with Kramnik emerging the winner.
