= World Chess Championship 2004 =

World Chess Championship 2004 may refer to:

- FIDE World Chess Championship 2004, a knockout tournament which took place at the Almahary Hotel in Tripoli, Libya
- Classical World Chess Championship 2004, a match between challenger Peter Leko and defending champion Vladimir Kramnik
