= List of chess games between Kasparov and Kramnik =

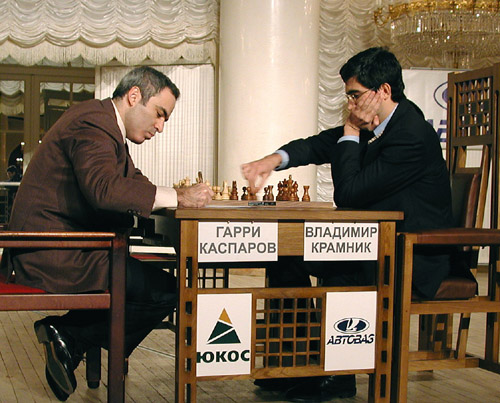
Kasparov playing against Vladimir Kramnik in the Botvinnik Memorial match in Moscow, 2001

Garry Kasparov and Vladimir Kramnik have played 49 classical chess games, of which Kramnik won five, Kasparov won four, with the remaining 40 games drawn. Thus the overall score favors Kramnik (+5−4=40). If blitz and rapid games are included (where time controls are much shorter than in classical games) the overall score favors Kasparov (+22−21=79). The first decisive classical game between the two players was at Linares in 1994, which Kramnik won at the age of just 18.

Kasparov achieved two wins before the title match against Kramnik's Sicilian Defence. Kramnik had success against Kasparov's King's Indian Defence. In the title match Kramnik dropped the Sicilian and successfully employed the Berlin defence of the Ruy Lopez. The score was 5–3 in favor for Kramnik after the match, but Kasparov narrowed the gap to 5–4 in Astana 2001.

All the decisive games were won by white except for a win by Kramnik in 1996. After the tournament in Astana the players met only in the Botvinnik Memorial match and in Linares 2003 and 2004. Kasparov retired from professional chess in 2005.

	White	Black	Year	Result	Moves	Winner	Tournament	Opening	Notes and Reference
1	Kramnik	Kasparov	1993	½–½	19		Linares	E86 King's Indian Defence	
2	Kramnik	Kasparov	1994	1–0	40	Kramnik	Linares	E93 King's Indian Defence	
3	Kasparov	Kramnik	1994	1–0	35	Kasparov	Novgorod	B33 Sicilian Defence	
4	Kramnik	Kasparov	1994	½–½	26		Novgorod	D85 English Opening	
5	Kramnik	Kasparov	1995	½–½	14		Riga, Tal Memorial	C54 Italian Game	
6	Kramnik	Kasparov	1995	½–½	58		Novgorod	C55 Two Knights Defense	
7	Kasparov	Kramnik	1995	½–½	13		Horgen	B57 Sicilian Defence	
8	Kasparov	Kramnik	1996	1–0	43	Kasparov	Amsterdam	B66 Sicilian Defence	
9	Kasparov	Kramnik	1996	0–1	35	Kramnik	Dos Hermanas	D48 Queen's Gambit	The only black win between Kramnik and Kasparov ()
10	Kasparov	Kramnik	1996	½–½	19		Las Palmas	E71 King's Indian Defence	
11	Kramnik	Kasparov	1996	½–½	58		Las Palmas	D56 Queen's Gambit	
12	Kasparov	Kramnik	1997	1–0	58	Kasparov	Linares	E59 Nimzo-Indian Defence	
13	Kramnik	Kasparov	1997	1–0	32	Kramnik	Novgorod	E97 King's Indian Defence	
14	Kramnik	Kasparov	1997	½–½	41		Novgorod	B66 Sicilian Defence	
15	Kasparov	Kramnik	1997	½–½	35		Tilburg	E39 Nimzo-Indian Defence	
16	Kramnik	Kasparov	1998	½–½	26		Linares	D85 Grünfeld Defence	
17	Kasparov	Kramnik	1998	½–½	52		Linares	E32 Nimzo-Indian Defence	
18	Kramnik	Kasparov	1999	½–½	28		Wijk aan Zee	D49 Semi-Slav Defense	
19	Kasparov	Kramnik	1999	½–½	20		Linares	E34 Nimzo-Indian Defence	
20	Kramnik	Kasparov	1999	½–½	35		Linares	D88 Grünfeld Defence	
21	Kramnik	Kasparov	2000	½–½	37		Wijk aan Zee	D85 Grünfeld Defence	
22	Kasparov	Kramnik	2000	½–½	21		Linares	C42 Petrov's Defence	
23	Kramnik	Kasparov	2000	½–½	41		Linares	D23 Queen's Gambit	
24	Kasparov	Kramnik	2000	½–½	25		London (1)	C67 Ruy Lopez	
25	Kramnik	Kasparov	2000	1–0	40	Kramnik	London (2)	D85 Grünfeld Defence	
26	Kasparov	Kramnik	2000	½–½	53		London (3)	C67 Ruy Lopez	
27	Kramnik	Kasparov	2000	½–½	74		London (4)	D27 Queen's Gambit	
28	Kasparov	Kramnik	2000	½–½	24		London (5)	A34 English Opening	
29	Kramnik	Kasparov	2000	½–½	66		London (6)	D27 Queen's Gambit	
30	Kasparov	Kramnik	2000	½–½	11		London (7)	A32 English Opening	
31	Kramnik	Kasparov	2000	½–½	38		London (8)	E32 Nimzo-Indian Defence	
32	Kasparov	Kramnik	2000	½–½	33		London (9)	C67 Ruy Lopez	
33	Kramnik	Kasparov	2000	1–0	25	Kramnik	London (10)	E54 Nimzo-Indian Defence	
34	Kasparov	Kramnik	2000	½–½	41		London (11)	C78 Ruy Lopez	
35	Kramnik	Kasparov	2000	½–½	33		London (12)	E55 Nimzo-Indian Defence	
36	Kasparov	Kramnik	2000	½–½	14		London (13)	C67 Ruy Lopez	
37	Kramnik	Kasparov	2000	½–½	57		London (14)	A30 English Opening	
38	Kasparov	Kramnik	2000	½–½	38		London (15)	E05 Catalan Opening	Kramnik won the title ()
39	Kasparov	Kramnik	2001	½–½	46		Wijk aan Zee	C67 Ruy Lopez	
40	Kramnik	Kasparov	2001	½–½	30		Astana	D85 Grünfeld Defence	
41	Kasparov	Kramnik	2001	1–0	46	Kasparov	Astana	C67 Ruy Lopez	This win in the last round enabled Kasparov to overtake Kramnik and take sole possession of the first place ()
42	Kramnik	Kasparov	2001	½–½	18		Botvinnik Memorial	D27 Queen's Gambit	
43	Kasparov	Kramnik	2001	½–½	72		Botvinnik Memorial	B41 Sicilian Defence	
44	Kramnik	Kasparov	2001	½–½	21		Botvinnik Memorial	D58 Queen's Gambit	
45	Kasparov	Kramnik	2001	½–½	19		Botvinnik Memorial	C80 Ruy Lopez	
46	Kramnik	Kasparov	2003	½–½	18		Linares	D27 Queen's Gambit	
47	Kasparov	Kramnik	2003	½–½	33		Linares	C88 Ruy Lopez	
48	Kasparov	Kramnik	2004	½–½	44		Linares	E12 Queen's Indian Defence	
49	Kramnik	Kasparov	2004	½–½	17		Linares	D27 Queen's Gambit	
