= World Chess Championship 2006 =

Chess match between Vladimir Kramnik and Veselin Topalov

	Classical world champion	FIDE world champion
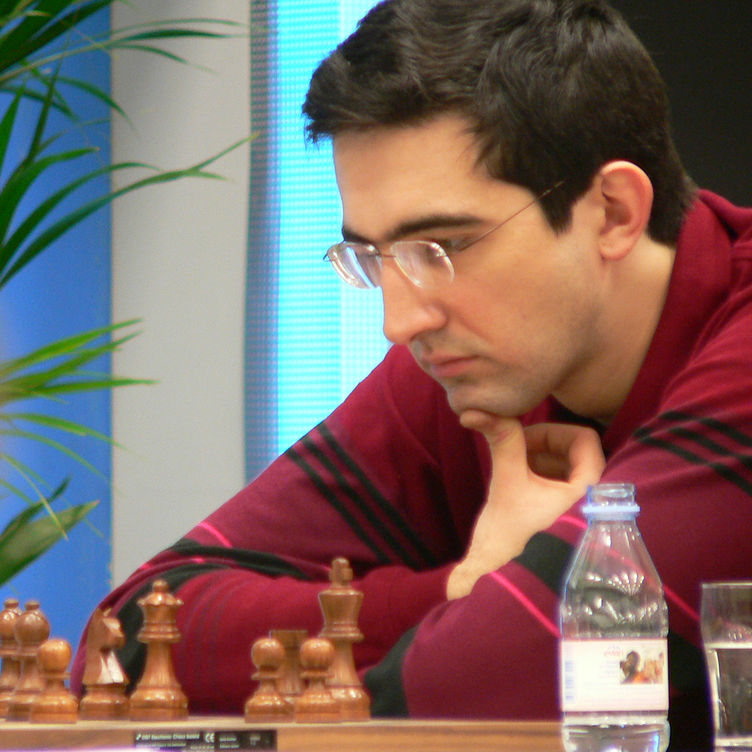
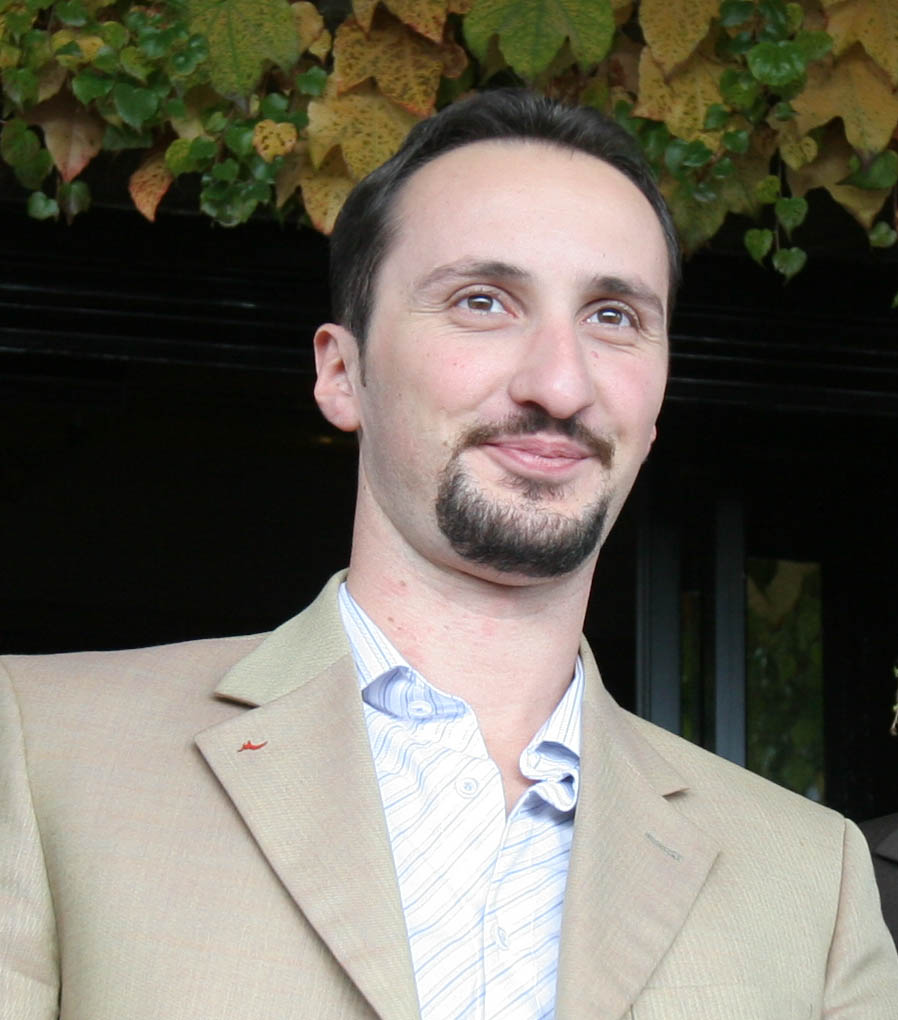
	Vladimir Kramnik	Veselin Topalov
	(Russia) Vladimir Kramnik	(Bulgaria) Veselin Topalov
6 (2½)	Scores	6 (1½)
	Born 25 June 1975; 31 years old	Born 15 March 1975; 31 years old
	Winner of the 2004 Classical World Chess Championship	Winner of the 2005 FIDE World Championship
	Rating: 2743 (World No. 4)	Rating: 2813 (World No. 1)

The World Chess Championship 2006 was a match between Classical World Chess Champion Vladimir Kramnik and FIDE World Chess Champion Veselin Topalov. The title of World Chess Champion had been split for 13 years. This match, played between September 23 and October 13, 2006, in Elista, Kalmykia, Russia, was to reunite the two World Chess Champion titles and produce an undisputed World Champion.

Kramnik won the first two games, establishing a commanding lead. However, after Topalov's camp alleged that Kramnik was using computer assistance, Kramnik refused to play Game 5 and forfeited. He eventually agreed to play again under protest. Topalov won games 8 and 9, taking the lead for the first time, but Kramnik struck back with a win in game 10. The remaining games were drawn, sending the match to a tiebreak. After a draw in the first game and a win apiece in the second and third games, Kramnik won the fourth game after Topalov blundered, to win the tiebreak and the match, becoming the 14th undisputed World Chess Champion.

== Background ==
After Garry Kasparov split from FIDE in 1993, there were two world chess champions. There was the 'Classical' world champion, the title that only passes on to a player when they defeat the previous world champion. This was held by Kasparov, until he was defeated by Kramnik in the Classical World Chess Championship 2000. There was also the 'Official' FIDE world champion, determined by various tournament formats, held since the FIDE World Chess Championship 2005 by Topalov.

From 1993 to 2006, no match was ever held between the various classical and official champions. This match brought the two titleholders together to unify the World Chess Championship for the first time since the 1993 split.

== Negotiations ==
Match logo

Kramnik was invited to the FIDE World Chess Championship 2005 in San Luis, Argentina. As "Classical" World Champion, he refused to play, but indicated his willingness to play the winner in a match to unify the title. Negotiations for a match began soon after Topalov won in San Luis, but broke down after the two camps were unable to overcome substantial differences of opinion.

However, in April 2006, FIDE announced that Kramnik would play current FIDE Champion Veselin Topalov in a world championship match to unify the "Classical" champion line with the FIDE championship. The prize fund of $1 million would be evenly divided between the players – regardless of the outcome of the match.

== Head to head ==
In past encounters, Kramnik had defeated Topalov 10 times, lost 5 games, with 24 draws. (This becomes +19 −9 =24 if rapid and blindfold games are included.) In classical time control games since the beginning of 2004, the score was 2 wins each, with 3 draws.

== Match conditions ==
The match was a best of 12 games. Players scored 1 point for a win and half a point for a draw. If, after 12 games, the score was tied at 6 points each, then a tie-break would be held. As it turned out, the first round of tie-breaks (rapid games) was indeed required, and was held on October 13, 2006.

=== Time control ===
From the match conditions:

The primary time control for each game shall be: 40 moves in the first 120 minutes, and if that is met, then a secondary time control of 20 moves in 60 minutes, and if that is also met, then the rest of the game shall be played out in 15 minutes, with an additional 30 seconds per move starting from move 61.

=== Tie-break method ===
- The tie break is only used if the match is tied at 6 points apiece after the 12 classical games.
- In the event of the tie-break, the players play four "rapid" games (each with a time limit of 25 minutes, plus 10 seconds per move).
- If the score is still tied, this is followed by two "blitz" games (each with a time limit of 5 minutes, plus 10 seconds per move).
- If the score is still tied, this is followed by a sudden death game: white has 6 minutes and needs to win, black has five minutes and needs to draw or win.

== Schedule and results ==
Colors were determined for the classical games by the drawing of lots at the opening ceremony on 21 September 2006. The colors reversed between games 6 and 7. The colors for the first tie-break game were decided by drawing lots again. All classical games, and the first tie-break game, began at 3:00 p.m. local time, which corresponds to 1100 UTC.

=== Classical games ===
Game	Date	White	Black	Result	Standing
Game 1	23 September	Kramnik	Topalov	Kramnik win	Kramnik leads 1 – 0
Game 2	24 September	Topalov	Kramnik	Kramnik win	Kramnik leads 2 – 0
Game 3	26 September	Kramnik	Topalov	Draw	Kramnik leads 2½ – ½
Game 4	27 September	Topalov	Kramnik	Draw	Kramnik leads 3 – 1
Game 5	29 September	Kramnik	Topalov	Topalov win (forfeit)	Kramnik leads 3 – 2
Game 6	2 October	Topalov	Kramnik	Draw	Kramnik leads 3½ – 2½
Game 7	4 October	Topalov	Kramnik	Draw	Kramnik leads 4 – 3
Game 8	5 October	Kramnik	Topalov	Topalov win	Match level 4 – 4
Game 9	7 October	Topalov	Kramnik	Topalov win	Topalov leads 5 – 4
Game 10	8 October	Kramnik	Topalov	Kramnik win	Match level 5 – 5
Game 11	10 October	Topalov	Kramnik	Draw	Match level 5½ – 5½
Game 12	12 October	Kramnik	Topalov	Draw	Match tied 6 – 6

=== Rapid tie-break games ===
Game	Date	White	Black	Result	Standing
Game 13	13 October	Topalov	Kramnik	Draw	Tie-break level ½ – ½
Game 14	13 October	Kramnik	Topalov	Kramnik win	Kramnik leads tie-break 1½ – ½
Game 15	13 October	Topalov	Kramnik	Topalov win	Tie-break level 1½ – 1½
Game 16	13 October	Kramnik	Topalov	Kramnik win	Kramnik wins tie-break 2½ – 1½

== Classical games ==
This is the only world chess championship match where the same first move (1.d4) was played in every game. Only two openings, the Slav Defense and the Catalan, were played.

=== Game 1, Kramnik–Topalov, 1–0 ===
Position: b7 black rook, c6 white knight, f6 black pawn, d5 white pawn, e5 black pawn, h5 black king, a4 white rook, e4 black knight, e3 white pawn, f3 black pawn, h3 white pawn, f2 white pawn, h2 white king

Game 1: Topalov's 57...f5?? led to a loss.

Kramnik won the first round of this match in a 75-move game that lasted six and a half hours. Out of a Catalan opening, Kramnik failed to get any advantage. In the middlegame Topalov played 26...Bf3!?, a move which allowed him to establish a pawn on f3, a powerful positional trump that was however hard to defend. The pawn wedged White's f2-pawn and kept White on the defensive, sufficiently so that Topalov refused a repetition on move 42. Topalov was within sight of winning the game when Kramnik played the excellent 56. d5!, going for counterplay at an opportune time. Topalov failed to react correctly and with 57...f5? missed a last chance at a perpetual, after which Kramnik reached a winning endgame with two extra pawns.

Catalan Opening, E04
1. d4 Nf6 2. c4 e6 3. Nf3 d5 4. g3 dxc4 5. Bg2 Bb4+ 6. Bd2 a5 7. Qc2 Bxd2+ 8. Qxd2 c6 9. a4 b5 10. axb5 cxb5 11. Qg5 0-0 12. Qxb5 Ba6 13.Qa4 Qb6 14. 0-0 Qxb2 15. Nbd2 Bb5 16. Nxc4 Bxa4 17. Nxb2 Bb5 18. Ne5 Ra7 19. Bf3 Nbd7 20. Nec4 Rb8 21. Rfb1 g5 22. e3 g4 23. Bd1 Bc6 24.Rc1 Be4 25. Na4 Rb4 26. Nd6 Bf3 27. Bxf3 gxf3 28. Nc8 Ra8 29. Ne7+ Kg7 30. Nc6 Rb3 31. Nc5 Rb5 32. h3 Nxc5 33. Rxc5 Rb2 34. Rg5+ Kh6 35. Rgxa5 Rxa5 36. Nxa5 Ne4 37. Rf1 Nd2 38. Rc1 Ne4 39. Rf1 f6 40. Nc6 Nd2 41. Rd1 Ne4 42. Rf1 Kg6 Topalov plays for a win. 42...Nd2 43.Rd1 Ne4 would repeat moves, with a likely draw. 43. Nd8 Rb6 44. Rc1 h5 45. Ra1 h4 46. gxh4 Kh5 47. Ra2 Kxh4 48. Kh2 Kh5 49. Rc2 Kh6 50. Ra2 Kg6 51. Rc2 Kf5 52. Ra2 Rb5 53. Nc6 Rb7 54. Ra5+ Kg6 55. Ra2 Kh5 56. d5 e5 57. Ra4 f5?? 57...Nxf2! 58.Kg3 e4! 59.Kxf2 Rb2+ 60.Ke1 Rb1+ 61.Kf2 Rb2+ followed by continued checks on b1 and b2 draws. White cannot vary from this line with 60.Kg3?? because 60...Rg2+ 61.Kf4 f2 62.Ra1 Rg1 wins, nor with 60.Ke1 Rb1+ 61.Kd2?? because 61...f2 wins. 58. Nxe5 Rb2 59. Nd3 Rb7 60. Rd4 Rb6 61. d6 Nxd6 62. Kg3 Ne4+ 63. Kxf3 Kg5 64. h4+ Kf6 65. Rd5 Nc3 66. Rd8 Rb1 67. Rf8+ Ke6 68. Nf4+ Ke5 69. Re8+ Kf6 70. Nh5+ Kg6 71. Ng3 Rb2 72. h5+ Kf7 73. Re5 Nd1 74. Ne2 Kf6 75. Rd5 1–0

=== Game 2, Topalov–Kramnik, 0–1 ===
Position: e8 black rook, f8 black bishop, g8 black king, a7 black pawn, b7 black pawn, e6 black pawn, b5 black queen, d5 black pawn, e5 white pawn, d4 white pawn, f4 white pawn, g4 black pawn, e3 white bishop, f3 white knight, b2 black rook, c2 white queen, g1 white rook, h1 white king

Game 2: Topalov missed victory by playing 32. Qg6+ instead of 32. Rxg4+ in this position. Kramnik, who had also overlooked the possibility, suggested that both players' fixation on the idea of the White queen checking from g6 prevented them from noticing that the queen could also threaten the Black king from c7.

Kramnik won the second game of the match after 63 moves, taking a 2–0 lead. Topalov missed winning continuations at move 32 and 36. Some inaccuracies later in the game cost him the draw.

Slav Defense, D19
1. d4 d5 2. c4 c6 3. Nc3 Nf6 4. Nf3 dxc4 5. a4 Bf5 6. e3 e6 7. Bxc4 Bb4 8. 0-0 Nbd7 9. Qe2 Bg6 10. e4 0-0 11. Bd3 Bh5 12. e5 Nd5 13. Nxd5 cxd5 14. Qe3 Bg6 15. Ng5 Re8 16. f4 Bxd3 17. Qxd3 f5 18. Be3 Nf8 19. Kh1 Rc8 20. g4 Qd7 21. Rg1 Be7 22. Nf3 Rc4 23. Rg2 fxg4 24. Rxg4 Rxa4 25. Rag1 g6 26. h4 Rb4 27. h5 Qb5 28. Qc2 Rxb2 29. hxg6 h5 Kramnik said that he wanted to play 29...Nxg6, but saw 30.Qxg6+!! hxg6 31.Rxg6+ Kh7 (31...Kf7 32.Rg7+ Kf8 33.Rg8+ Kf7 34.R1g7#) 32.R6g3! forcing mate. 30. g7! hxg4 31. gxf8Q+ Bxf8? 31...Kxf8! 32. Qg6+? 32.Rxg4+ wins immediately, e.g. 32...Bg7 33.Qc7! Qf1+ 34.Ng1, or 32...Kh8 33.Qg6 (Or 33. Rh4+ Bh6 34. Rxh6+ Kg7 35. Qh7+ Kf8 36. Rf6# - According to Stockfish). Bg7 33. f5 Re7 34. f6 Qe2 35. Qxg4 Rf7 36. Rc1 (36.Qh5! still wins) 36...Rc2 37. Rxc2 Qd1+ 38. Kg2 Qxc2+ 39. Kg3 Qe4 40. Bf4 Qf5 41. Qxf5 exf5 42. Bg5 a5 43. Kf4 a4 44. Kxf5 a3 45. Bc1 Bf8 46. e6 Rc7 47. Bxa3 Bxa3 48. Ke5 Rc1 49. Ng5 Rf1 50. e7 Re1+ 51. Kxd5 Bxe7 52. fxe7 Rxe7 53. Kd6 Re1? (GM John Nunn demonstrated that 53...Re3! was the only winning move.) 54. d5 Kf8 55. Ne6+? GM Mihail Marin, annotating the game on the ChessBase site after the game, noted that endgame tablebases show that 55.Kd7! still draws. Ke8 56. Nc7+ Kd8 57. Ne6+ Kc8 58. Ke7 Rh1 59. Ng5 b5 60. d6 Rd1 61. Ne6 b4 62. Nc5 Re1+ 63. Kf6 Re3 0–1

=== Game 3, Kramnik–Topalov, ½–½ ===
Position: f8 black rook, g8 black king, a6 black pawn, g6 black pawn, d5 white pawn, e5 black pawn, f5 black pawn, h5 black pawn, e4 white pawn, a3 black pawn, b3 white rook, d3 white queen, g3 white pawn, a2 black queen, f2 white pawn, g2 white king, h2 white pawn

Game 3: position after 35. ... f5!. With less than a minute on his clock, Kramnik sacrificed his rook to obtain perpetual check.

The third game ended in a draw after 38 moves keeping Kramnik in a 2½–½ lead. Kramnik (white) had the advantage for much of the game. According to commentators he at least twice avoided moves with more winning chances but which also carried more risk: 17. Ne4 and 32. exd5.

Catalan Opening, E02
1. d4 Nf6 2. c4 e6 3. Nf3 d5 4. g3 dxc4 5. Bg2 Nc6 6. Qa4 Bd7 7. Qxc4 Na5 8. Qd3 c5 9. 0-0 Bc6 10. Nc3 cxd4 11. Nxd4 Bc5 12. Rd1 Bxg2 13. Qb5+! Nd7 14. Kxg2 a6 15. Qd3 Rc8 16. Bg5! Be7 17. Bxe7 Qxe7 18. Rac1 Nc4 19. Na4 b5 20. b3 0-0 21. bxc4 bxa4 22. Nc6 Rxc6 23. Qxd7 Qc5 24. Rc3 g6 25. Rb1 h5 26. Rb7 e5 27. e4 Rf6 28. Rc2 Qa3 29. Qd1 Rd6 30. Rd2 Rfd8 31. Rd5 Rxd5 32. cxd5 Qxa2 33. Qf3 Rf8 34. Qd3 a3 35. Rb3 f5! 36. Qxa6 36.Rxa3 fxe4 37.Rxa2 exd3 would give Black the advantage. 36...Qxb3 37. Qxg6+ Kh8 38. Qh6+ Kg8 ½–½

=== Game 4, Topalov–Kramnik, ½–½ ===
The fourth game ended in a draw after White's 54th move, leaving Kramnik with a 3–1 lead. Topalov pressed hard, sacrificing a pawn. He achieved an advantageous endgame but despite five hours of play he failed to convert it (48.Qxc4! gave good chances, according to Sergei Shipov on chesspro.ru).

Semi-Slav Defense, D47
1.d4 d5 2.c4 c6 3.Nc3 Nf6 4.e3 e6 5.Nf3 Nbd7 6.Bd3 dxc4 7.Bxc4 b5 8.Bd3 Bb7 9.a3 b4 10.Ne4 Nxe4 11.Bxe4 bxa3 12.0-0 Bd6 13.b3 Nf6 14.Nd2 Qc7 15.Bf3!? Bxh2+ 16.Kh1 Bd6 17.Nc4 Be7 18.Bxa3 0-0 19.Bxe7 Qxe7 20.Ra5 Rfd8 21.Kg1 c5 22.Rxc5 Ne4 23.Bxe4 Bxe4 24.Qg4 Bd3 25.Ra1 Rac8 26.Raa5 Rb8 27.Qd1 Be4 28.Qa1 Rb7 29.Nd2 Bg6 30.Qc3 h6 31.Ra6 Kh7 32.Nc4 Be4 33.f3 Bd5 34.Nd2 Rdb8 35.Qd3+ f5 36.Rc3 Qh4 37.Ra1 Qg3 38.Qc2 Rf7 39.Rf1 Qg6 40.Qd3 Qg3 41.Rfc1 Rfb7 42.Qc2 Qg5 43.Ra1 Qf6 44.Qd3 Rd7 45.Ra4 Rbd8 46.Rc5 Kg8 47.Nc4 Bxc4 48.Raxc4 f4 49.Rc6 fxe3 50.Qxe3 Rxd4 51.Rxe6 Qh4 52.Rxd4 Qxd4 53.Re8+ Kh7 54.Qxd4 ½–½

=== Game 5, Kramnik–Topalov, 0–1 (forfeit) ===
Kramnik was due to play the white pieces. The game ended with Topalov winning by forfeit, after Kramnik refused to play and his clock had been allowed to run for one hour. Kramnik's lead was reduced to 3–2. This is the first world chess championship match since Spassky–Fischer 1972 in which a game was forfeited.

=== Game 6, Topalov–Kramnik, ½–½ ===
Game 6 was due to be played on September 30, but was postponed until October 2 by the decision of the FIDE president. On September 30 and October 1 negotiations over match continuation between players, their teams, and FIDE took place instead. Kramnik agreed to play Game 6 under protest, with the status of Game 5 to be resolved later. The game was uneventful, ending in a draw after 31 moves. Kramnik played a rare sideline and gradually equalized. Kramnik now led 3½–2½.

Slav Defense, D17
1.d4 d5 2.c4 c6 3.Nf3 Nf6 4.Nc3 dxc4 5.a4 Bf5 6.Ne5 e6 7.f3 c5 8.e4 Bg6 9.Be3 cxd4 10.Qxd4 Qxd4 11.Bxd4 Nfd7! 12.Nxd7 Nxd7 13.Bxc4 a6 14.Ke2 Rg8 15.Rhd1 Rc8 16.b3 Bc5 17.a5 Ke7 18.Na4 Bb4 19.Nb6 Nxb6 20.Bxb6 f6 21.Rd3 Rc6 22.h4 Rgc8 23.g4 Bc5 24.Rad1 Bxb6 25.Rd7+ Kf8 26.axb6 Rxb6 27.R1d6 Rxd6 28.Rxd6 Rc6! 29.Rxc6 bxc6 30.b4 e5 31.Bxa6 ½–½

=== Game 7, Topalov–Kramnik, ½–½ ===
The 5-hour game, a Semi-Slav Defence, was characterized as "a hard-fought 60-move draw". Topalov successfully defended a RBvRN ending a pawn down. Kramnik now led 4–3.

Semi-Slav Defense, D47
1.d4 d5 2.c4 c6 3.Nf3 Nf6 4.e3 e6 5.Bd3 dxc4 6.Bxc4 c5 7.0-0 a6 8.Bb3 cxd4 9.exd4 Nc6 10.Nc3 Be7 11.Re1 0-0 12.a4 Bd7 13.Ne5 Be8 14.Be3 Rc8 15.Rc1 Nb4 16.Qf3 Bc6 17.Qh3 Bd5 18.Nxd5 Nbxd5 19.Rcd1 Rc7 20.Bg5 Qc8 21.Qf3 Rd8 22.h4 h6 23.Bc1 Bb4 24.Rf1 Bd6 25.g3 b6 26.Qe2 Ne7 27.Rfe1 Bxe5 28.dxe5 Rxd1 29.Qxd1 Nfd5 30.Bd2 Rc5 31.Qg4 Nf5 32.Qe4 b5 33.h5 bxa4 34.Qxa4 Rb5 35.Rc1 Qb7 36.Bc2 Nb6 37.Qg4 Rxb2 38. Be4 Qd7 39. Be1 Nd5 40. Bd3 Nb4 41.Bf1 Nd3 42.Qd1 Nxe5 43.Qxd7 Nxd7 44.Rc8+ Kh7 45.Rc7 Rb1 46.Rxd7 Rxe1 47.Rxf7 a5 48.Kg2 Kg8 49.Ra7 Re5 50.g4 Nd6 51.Bd3 Kf8 52.Bg6 Rd5 53.f3 e5 54.Kf2 Rd2+ 55.Ke1 Rd5 56.Ke2 Rb5 57.Rd7 Rd5 58.Ra7 Rb5 59.Bd3 Rd5 60.Bg6 ½–½

=== Game 8, Kramnik–Topalov, 0–1 ===
Position: a8 black rook, b7 white rook, d7 black knight, d6 black king, e6 black pawn, a5 black pawn, d5 black knight, f5 black pawn, a4 white pawn, f4 white pawn, b3 white pawn, e3 white pawn, f3 white king, g3 black pawn, g2 white pawn, c1 white rook

Game 8: Kramnik played 41. Kxg3?, worsening his position.

Game 8 lasted 4½ hours, and resulted in Topalov's first win over the board in the match, tying the score at 4–4. It featured the strategically unbalanced Meran Variation Semi-Slav Defense. Topalov's 15...Qa5 was a theoretical novelty. After 21 moves, the players reached a sharp, complicated, queenless middlegame with Topalov having two knights for Kramnik's rook and pawn. Topalov spun a mating web with his knights and rook, aided by Kramnik's mistakes on moves 32 and 41.

Semi-Slav Defense, D47
1. d4 d5 2. c4 c6 3. Nf3 Nf6 4. Nc3 e6 5. e3 Nbd7 6. Bd3 dxc4 7. Bxc4 b5 8. Be2 Bb7 9. 0-0 b4 10. Na4 c5!? Sharper than the standard 10...Be7 11. dxc5 Nxc5 12. Bb5+ This has been played before, but GM Sveshnikov considered it inferior, leaving White's knight awkwardly placed at a4. Ncd7 13. Ne5 Qc7 14. Qd4 Rd8! 15. Bd2 Qa5 16. Bc6 Be7! If 17. Bxb7 Nxe5 17. Rfc1 17. b3!? avoids the trade of two knights for rook and pawn that now occurs. Bxc6 18. Nxc6 Qxa4 19. Nxd8 Bxd8 20. Qxb4 Qxb4 21. Bxb4 Nd5 22. Bd6 f5 Commenting during the game, Susan Polgar wrote, "Yasser Seirawan says: 'I'm not sure what Vladimir thought was "attractive" about this ending. With Kf7 and Bb6 in the offing... Black looks very good.' I agree with Yasser." 23. Rc8 N5b6 24. Rc6 Be7 25. Rd1 Kf7 26. Rc7 Ra8 27.Rb7 Ke8 28. Bxe7 Kxe7 29. Rc1 a5 30. Rc6 Nd5 31. h4 Polgar wrote that here GMs Avrukh, Karjakin, and Fedorowicz preferred White, while Zagrebelnyi and Radjabov preferred Black. h6 32. a4?! After the game, Polgar wrote of this move, "A positional mistake! Better was simply 32. Kf1 g5 33. hxg5 hxg5 34. Ke2." Now White has a backward pawn on b3, which comes under attack on move 42. g5 33. hxg5 hxg5 34. Kf1 g4! Now f2–f3 can be met by g3 35. Ke2 N5f6 36. b3 Ne8 37. f3 g3! Keeping more pawns on the board in order to play for the win. 38. Rc1 Nef6 39. f4 Kd6 40. Kf3 Nd5 41. Kxg3? (41. Rb5 holds.) Polgar called this "a horrible move", but thought White's position was now very bad in any case. 41... Nc5 42. Rg7 Rb8 Now White's position is a mass of weaknesses. White cannot stop Black from invading on either the b- or the g-file. 43. Ra7 Rg8+ 44. Kf3 Ne4 45. Ra6+ Ke7 46. Rxa5 Rg3+ 47. Ke2 Rxe3+ 48. Kf1 Rxb3 49. Ra7+ Kf6 50. Ra8 Nxf4 51. Ra1 Rb2 52. a5 Rf2+ 0–1

=== Game 9, Topalov–Kramnik, 1–0 ===
Position: d8 black rook, e8 black rook, g8 black king, a7 black pawn, c7 black queen, f7 black pawn, g7 black pawn, b6 black knight, c6 black pawn, e6 black knight, g6 black pawn, e5 white pawn, d4 white pawn, g4 white bishop, h4 white pawn, c3 white pawn, g3 white pawn, a2 white queen, d1 white rook, f1 white rook, g1 white bishop, h1 white king

Game 9: position after 34 moves. The following attack by Topalov forced Kramnik to resign.

Game 9 was a 3-hour tussle featuring a Slav Defense. Topalov's 6.Nh4 and 7.Nxg6 is a standard idea gaining White the advantage of the bishop pair. Topalov followed up in unusual fashion, however, with a3, g3, and f4 on the next three moves, leading Susan Polgar to observe that, "Topalov made way too many Pawn moves in the opening." However, Kramnik was unable to find an effective response and eventually ended up in a middlegame position where his two knights were outmatched by Topalov's powerful bishops. Topalov steadily improved his position, seizing space and launching an attack on the king-side. A strong tactical blow by Topalov on move 38 won the game for him. Kramnik, who had struggled with a steadily deteriorating position in time trouble, resigned following Topalov's 39th move. Topalov took the lead for the first time in the match, with the score now 5–4.

Slav Defense, D12
1. d4 d5 2. c4 c6 3. Nf3 Nf6 4. e3 Bf5 5. Nc3 e6 6. Nh4 Bg6 7. Nxg6 hxg6 8. a3 Nbd7 9. g3 Be7 10. f4 dxc4 11. Bxc4 0-0 12. e4 b5 13. Be2 b4 14. axb4 Bxb4 15. Bf3 Qb6 16. 0-0 e5 17. Be3 Rad8 18. Na4 Qb8 19. Qc2 exf4? Polgar: "This is not a good move. He had to take the d pawn." 20. Bxf4 Qb7 21. Rad1 Rfe8 22. Bg5 Be7 23. Kh1 Nh7 24. Be3 Bg5 25. Bg1 Nhf8 26. h4 Be7 27. e5 Nb8 28. Nc3 Bb4 Yasser Seirawan: "Vladimir's position is slipping away..." 29. Qg2 Qc8 30. Rc1 Bxc3?? 31. bxc3 Ne6 32. Bg4 Qc7 33. Rcd1 Nd7 34. Qa2 Nb6 35. Rf3 Nf8? 36. Rdf1 Re7 37. Be3 Nh7 38. Rxf7 Nd5 39. R7f3 1–0

=== Game 10, Kramnik–Topalov, 1–0 ===
Position: d8 black bishop, e8 black queen, f8 black rook, g8 black king, a7 white rook, f7 black pawn, g7 black pawn, h7 black pawn, a6 black bishop, b6 black rook, a5 black pawn, b5 white knight, d5 black pawn, e5 white knight, a4 white pawn, d4 white pawn, e4 black knight, f4 white bishop, g3 white pawn, b2 white pawn, e2 white queen, f2 white pawn, h2 white pawn, a1 white rook, g1 white king

Game 10: Topalov played 24... f6??, sealing his doom.

Kramnik played the solid Catalan System. At move 17, Topalov, playing Black, offered Kramnik the opportunity to win a pawn if he was willing to give up his fianchettoed king's bishop for a knight (and thus weaken his king position). Kramnik accepted the offer. Susan Polgar wrote that Topalov's "compensation is his Bishop pair, good Knight on e4 and the White Knight is pinned on b5."

However, Topalov blundered on move 24, allowing Kramnik to win a second pawn. Topalov then gave up his rook for a knight and two pawns. That left Kramnik ahead a rook for a knight and, after forcing the trade of queens, he won the endgame easily. The match was now level 5–5.

Catalan Opening, E08
1.d4 Nf6 2.c4 e6 3.Nf3 d5 4.g3 Bb4+ 5.Bd2 Be7 6.Bg2 0-0 7.0-0 c6 8.Bf4 Nbd7 9.Qc2 a5 10.Rd1 Nh5 11.Bc1 b5 12.cxd5 cxd5 13.e4 dxe4 14.Qxe4 Rb8 15.Qe2 Nhf6 16.Bf4 Rb6 17.Ne5 Nd5 18.Bxd5 exd5 19.Nc3 Nf6 20.Nxb5 Ba6 21.a4 Ne4 22.Rdc1 Qe8 23.Rc7 Bd8 24.Ra7 f6?? Polgar: "This is a blunder!" 25.Nd7 Rf7 26.Nxb6 Rxa7 27.Nxd5 Rd7 28.Ndc3 Rxd4 29.Re1 f5 30.Qc2 Rb4 31.Nd5 Rxb5 32.axb5 Qxb5 33.Nc7 Qc4 34.Qd1 Bxc7 35.Qd7! The point of Kramnik's clever 34.Qd1 (rather than the expected 34.Qxc4, which also would have won). Now White threatens both the bishop and 36.Qe8#. h6 36.Qxc7 Qb4 37.Qb8+ Qxb8 38.Bxb8 Nd2 39.Ra1 g5 40.f4 Nb3 41.Ra3 Bc4 42.Bc7 g4 43. Bxa5 1–0

=== Game 11, Topalov–Kramnik, ½–½ ===
Position: a8 black rook, e8 black king, h8 black rook, b7 black pawn, e7 black bishop, f7 black pawn, g7 black pawn, c6 black pawn, e6 black knight, g6 black pawn, c5 white pawn, b4 white pawn, d4 black queen, e4 white queen, f4 white pawn, g3 white pawn, e2 white bishop, h2 white pawn, b1 white rook, c1 white bishop, f1 white rook, g1 white king

Game 11: Position after Kramnik's 20... Qxd4+, equalizing.

The eleventh game ended in a draw after 66 moves, leaving the match level at 5½–5½. Towards the end, Kramnik was pressing hard for the full point, a pawn ahead in a rook and bishop endgame, but was unable to convert his advantage.

Slav Defense, D12
1.d4 d5 2.c4 c6 3.Nf3 Nf6 4.e3 Bf5 5.Nc3 e6 6.Nh4 Bg6 7.Nxg6 hxg6 8.Rb1 (This move is a novelty.) 8... Nbd7 9.c5 a5 10.a3 e5 11.b4 axb4 12.axb4 Qc7 13.f4 exf4 13...Nh5 14.fxe5 Ng3 15.Rg1 Rxh2 16.Qf3 Be7 17.Bd3 Bh4 18.Kd1 14.exf4 Be7 15.Be2 Nf8 16.0-0 Ne6 17.g3 Qd7 18.Qd3 18.b5? Nxc5! 19.dxc5 Bxc5+ 20.Kh1 Qh3 or 20.Kg2 Qh3+ 21.Kf3 Ng4 wins Ne4 19.Nxe4 dxe4 20.Qxe4 Qxd4+ 21.Qxd4 Nxd4 22.Bc4 0-0 23.Kg2 Ra4 24.Rd1 Rd8 25.Be3 Bf6 26.g4 Kf8 27.Bf2 Ne6 28.Rxd8+ Bxd8 29.f5 gxf5 30.gxf5 Nf4+ 31.Kf3 Nh5 32.Rb3 Bc7 33.h4 Nf6 34.Bd3 Nd7 35.Be4 Ne5+ 36.Kg2 Ra2 37.Bb1 Rd2 38.Kf1 Ng4 39.Bg1 Bh2 40.Ke1 Rd5 41.Bf2 Ke7 42.h5 Nxf2 43.Kxf2 Kf6 44.Kf3 Rd4 45.b5 Rc4 46.bxc6 bxc6 47.Rb6 Rxc5 48.Be4 Kg5 49.Rxc6 Ra5 50.Rb6 Ra3+ 51. Kg2 Bc7 52. Rb7 Rc3 53. Kf2 Kxh5 54. Bd5 f6 55. Ke2 Kg4 56. Be4 Kf4 57. Bd3 Rc5 58. Rb4+ Kg3 59. Rc4 Re5+ 60. Re4 Ra5 61.Re3+ Kg2 62.Be4+ Kh2 63.Rb3 Ra2+ 64.Kd3 Bf4 65.Kc4 Re2 66.Kd5 ½–½

=== Game 12, Kramnik–Topalov, ½–½ ===
This game featured the same variation of the Slav Defense (6.Nh4 Bg6 7.Nxg6 hxg6) as in games 9 (a Topalov win) and 11 (a draw), but for the first time Kramnik played the White side of this line. In a queen and rook endgame, with both kings open, Topalov forced a draw by perpetual check. This left the score tied 6–6 at the end of regular time-control play (Kramnik 6 – Topalov 5 in played games, plus the game 5 forfeit in favor of Topalov). Tie-breaker games were now played to determine the outcome of the match.

Slav Defense, D12
1.d4 d5 2.c4 c6 3.Nf3 Nf6 4.e3 Bf5 5.Nc3 e6 6.Nh4 Bg6 7.Nxg6 hxg6 8.g3 Nbd7 9.Bd2 Bb4 10.Qb3 Bxc3 11.Bxc3 Ne4 12.Bg2 Nxc3 13.Qxc3 f5 14.0-0 Qe7 15.cxd5 exd5 16.b4 Nf6 17.Rfc1 Ne4 18.Qb2 0-0 19.b5 Rac8 20.bxc6 bxc6 21.Qe2 g5 22.Rab1 Qd7 23.Rc2 Rf6 24.Rbc1 g4 25.Rb2 Rh6 26.Qa6 Rc7 27.Rb8+ Kh7 28.Qa3 Rb7 29.Qf8 Rxb8 30.Qxb8 Qf7 31.Qc8 Qh5 32.Kf1 Nd2+ 33.Ke1 Nc4 34.Bf1 Rf6 35.Bxc4 dxc4 36.Rxc4 Qxh2 37.Ke2 Qh1 38.Rc5 Qb1 39.Qa6 Qb2+ 40.Kf1 Qb1+ 41.Ke2 Qb2+ 42.Kf1 Rh6 43.Qd3 g6 44.Qb3 ½–½

== Tie-break games ==
=== Game 13, Topalov–Kramnik, ½–½ ===
In the middlegame of this first game in the rapid tie-break Topalov made a pawn offer, which Kramnik accepted. Kramnik then exploited some tactics to return the pawn and trade into a level endgame.

Slav Defense, D18
1. d4 d5 2. c4 c6 3. Nf3 Nf6 4. Nc3 dxc4 5. a4 Bf5 6. e3 e6 7. Bxc4 Bb4 8. 0-0 Nbd7 9. Qe2 0-0 10. e4 Bg6 11. Bd3 Bh5 12. e5 Nd5 13. Nxd5 cxd5 14. Qe3 Re8 15. Ne1 Rc8 16. f4 Bxe1 17. Rxe1 Bg6 18. Bf1 Rc2 19. b3 Qa5 20. Bb5 Rd8 21. Re2 Rcc8 22. Bd2 Qb6 23. Rf2 a6 24. Bf1 Rc6 25. b4 Rc2 26. b5 a5 27. Bc3 Rxf2 28. Qxf2 Qa7 29. Qd2 Ra8 30. Rc1 Nb6 31. Bb2 Nxa4 32. Ba3 h6 33.h3 Be4 34. Kh2 Nb6 35. Bc5 a4 36. Ra1 Nc4 37. Bxc4 b6 38. Qe3 Rc8 39. Bf1 bxc5 40. dxc5 Qxc5 41. Qxc5 Rxc5 42. b6 Rc6 43. b7 Rb6 44. Ba6 d4 45. Rxa4 Bxb7 46. Bxb7 Rxb7 47. Rxd4 ½–½

=== Game 14, Kramnik–Topalov, 1–0 ===
White obtained a minimal advantage from the opening, which he maintained until queens were exchanged. Kramnik won in the endgame, to go up 1½–½.

Semi-Slav Defense, D45
1. d4 d5 2. c4 c6 3. Nf3 Nf6 4. Nc3 e6 5. e3 Nbd7 6. Qc2 Bd6 7. b3 0-0 8. Be2 b6 9. 0-0 Bb7 10. Bb2 Re8 11. Rad1 Qe7 12. Rfe1 Rac8 13. Bd3 e5 14. e4 dxc4 15. Bxc4 b5 16. Bf1 g6 17. Qd2 Rcd8 18. Qg5 a6 19. h3 exd4 20. Nxd4 Qe5 21. Qxe5 Nxe5 22. Nc2 g5 23. Bc1 h6 24. Be3 c5 25. f3 Bf8 26. Bf2 Bc8 27. Ne3 Be6 28. Ned5 Bxd5 29. exd5 Ned7 30. Rxe8 Rxe8 31. a4 b4? Conceding White the passed a-pawn "was equivalent with complete strategic surrendering." – GM Mihail Marin commenting on Chessbase. 32. Ne4 Nxe4 33. fxe4 Nf6 34. d6 Nxe4 35. d7 Rd8 36. Bxa6 f5 37. a5 Bg7 38. Bc4+ Kf8 39. a6 Nxf2 40. Kxf2 Bd4+ 41. Rxd4! cxd4 42. a7 Ke7 43. Bd5 Kxd7 44. a8=Q Rxa8 45. Bxa8 1–0

=== Game 15, Topalov–Kramnik, 1–0 ===
Topalov equalized the tiebreak match with the sort of kingside attack he has become famous for.

Slav Defense, D12
1. d4 d5 2. c4 c6 3. Nf3 Nf6 4. e3 Bf5 5. Nc3 e6 6. Nh4 Bg6 7. Be2 Nbd7 8.0-0 Bd6 9. g3 dxc4 10. Bxc4 Nb6 11. Be2 0-0 12. Nxg6 hxg6 13. e4 e5 14. f4 exd4 15. Qxd4 Qe7 16. Kg2 Bc5 17. Qd3 Rad8 18. Qc2 Bd4 19. e5 Nfd5 20. Rf3 Nxc3 21. bxc3 Bc5 22. Bd2 Rd7 23. Re1 Rfd8 24. Bd3 Qe6 25. Bc1 f5 26. Qe2 Kf8 27. Rd1 Qe7 28. h4 Rd5 29. Qc2 Nc4 30. Rh1 Na3 31. Qe2 Qd7 32. Rd1 b5 33. g4! fxg4 34. Rg3 Ke7? 35. f5 gxf5 36. Bg5+ Ke8 37. e6 Qd6 38. Bxf5! Rxd1 39. Bg6+ Kf8 40. e7+ Qxe7 41. Bxe7+ Bxe7 42. Bd3 Ra1 43. Qb2 Rd1 44. Qe2 Ra1 45. Qxg4 Rxa2+ 46. Kh3 Bf6 47. Qe6 Rd2 48. Bg6 R2d7 49. Rf3 b4 50. h5 1–0

=== Game 16, Kramnik–Topalov, 1–0 ===
Position: a7 black rook, c7 black king, f7 black pawn, g7 black pawn, h7 black pawn, a6 white pawn, b6 white rook, e6 black pawn, g6 black bishop, a5 white rook, c5 white pawn, e3 white king, f3 white pawn, c2 black rook, g2 white pawn, h2 white pawn, f1 white bishop

Game 16: Topalov played 44...Rxc5?? losing the rook, the game and the match.

Just like in the second tiebreak game, Kramnik displayed his skill in positions where the queens have been exchanged. Topalov's small inaccuracy on move 20 (...Ne4 was better) was punished by a precise sequence of moves from Kramnik, which eventually won him a pawn. In an extremely difficult position, Topalov made one final blunder, and the match was over.

Semi-Slav Defense, D47
1. d4 d5 2. c4 c6 3. Nf3 Nf6 4. Nc3 e6 5. e3 Nbd7 6. Bd3 dxc4 7. Bxc4 b5 8. Be2 Bb7 9. 0-0 Be7 10. e4 b4 11. e5 bxc3 12. exf6 Bxf6 13. bxc3 c5 14. dxc5 Nxc5 15. Bb5+ Kf8 16. Qxd8+ Rxd8 17. Ba3 Rc8 18. Nd4 Be7 19. Rfd1 a6!? 20. Bf1 Na4?! 21. Rab1! Be4 22. Rb3! Bxa3 23. Rxa3 Nc5 24. Nb3! Ke7 25. Rd4! Bg6 26. c4 Rc6 27. Nxc5 Rxc5 28. Rxa6 Rb8 29. Rd1 Rb2 30. Ra7+ Kf6 31. Ra1 Rf5 32.f3 Re5 33. Ra3 Rc2 34. Rb3 Ra5 35. a4 Ke7 36. Rb5 Ra7 37. a5 Kd6 38. a6 Kc7 39. c5 Rc3 40. Raa5 Rc1 41. Rb3 Kc6 42. Rb6+ Kc7 43. Kf2 Rc2+ 44. Ke3 Rxc5?? 45. Rb7+ 1–0 since 45...Rxb7 46.Rxc5+ Kb6 47.axb7 and Black cannot recapture the rook without allowing White's pawn to promote.

Topalov's 44...Rxc5?? cost him the game and the title. However, in a post-match interview, Kramnik claimed that he had a decisive advantage even before Topalov's blunder. According to Australian GM Ian Rogers in Chess Life Online, White should still win against the superior defense 44...e5 with 45.Rab5.

World Chess Championship 2006
	Rating	Classical games												Points	Rapid games				Points
	Rating	1	2	3	4	5	6	7	8	9	10	11	12	Points	13	14	15	16	Points
Veselin Topalov (BUL)	2813	0	0	½	½	1*	½	½	1	1	0	½	½	6	½	0	1	0	7½
Vladimir Kramnik (RUS)	2743	1	1	½	½	0*	½	½	0	0	1	½	½	6	½	1	0	1	8½

Note: * indicates forfeit.

== Bathroom controversy ==
=== Allegations and forfeit ===
On September 28, 2006, the rest day between games 4 and 5, Topalov's manager Silvio Danailov complained to the match organizers and the press about Kramnik's repeated visits to the bathroom. He noted that the bathrooms are the only place not under audio or video surveillance, and called the frequency of the breaks "strange, if not suspicious". Danailov suggested that Topalov would abandon the match if the concerns were not addressed.

On September 29, 2006, the Appeals Committee, which consisted of Georgios Makropoulos, Jorge Vega, and Zurab Azmaiparashvili, determined that, although the frequency of Kramnik's visits to the toilet had been exaggerated, the private bathrooms would be closed and a common toilet opened for both players.

In response, Kramnik's manager Carsten Hensel issued a public statement insisting that the original match conditions be adhered to – defending Kramnik's actions by saying, "The restroom is small and Mr. Kramnik likes to walk and therefore uses the space of the bathroom as well... It should also be mentioned that Mr. Kramnik has to drink a lot of water during the games." Otherwise, "Mr. Kramnik will stop playing this match as long as FIDE is not ready to respect Mr. Kramnik's rights, in this case to use the toilet of his own restroom whenever he wishes to do so." Hensel also declared his lack of confidence in the Appeals Committee and demanded that its members be changed.

Awaiting a reversal of the Appeal Committee's decision, Kramnik refused to play Game 5. At 5:00 p.m. local time, the Chief Arbiter declared that Kramnik had forfeited.

FIDE President Kirsan Ilyumzhinov told Kramnik "...I hereby inform you of my full trust in the members of the Match Appeals Committee and their latest decision taken in respect of the appeal of Topalov's team dated 28 September 2006. I am also asking you in good faith to continue your participation in this match..."

Later, it emerged that Kramnik's team made a procedural blunder by not filing their protest before he defaulted the fifth game.

The players were invited for a meeting by Ilyumzhinov "to discuss the actual situation of the match and to solve the problems". Ilyumzhinov stated that cancelling the forfeit was possible, but that if no compromise was reached by noon on 1 October, the match would not continue.

On October 1, 2006, FIDE announced that agreement had been reached that the original bathroom arrangements would be reinstated and that the Appeals Committee had resigned and would be replaced.

Later that day, FIDE announced that Game 6 would be played on October 2, with the forfeit standing and the score Kramnik 3 – Topalov 2. Kramnik replied that he was "ready to proceed playing the match by reserving all my rights. My further participation will be subject to the condition to clarify my rights regarding game five at later stage."

On October 3, 2006, the new Appeals Committee responded to Kramnik's appeal against the Game 5 forfeit saying that they had no powers to vary the decisions of the original Appeals Committee. Earlier, Kramnik had said that if his appeal fails, "the only thing I know for sure is that in this case I will sue FIDE."

Kramnik's manager expressed concern that a member of Topalov's team might attempt to plant an electronic device in Kramnik's bathroom to foster suspicion that Kramnik is cheating. He suggested several measures relating to the inspection of the bathroom and Kramnik's person meant to forestall this possibility.

=== Reactions ===
On October 2, 2006, more than 30 GMs, WGMs, and IMs expressed open support for Kramnik's position – including former World Champions Anatoly Karpov and Boris Spassky, and multiple-time challenger Viktor Korchnoi. Spassky and Korchnoi had been involved in controversial World Chess Championship matches (World Chess Championship 1972 and World Chess Championship 1978 respectively). Spassky felt that Fischer had only disputed against the organizers, not his opponent's conduct. In interviews, Karpov and Korchnoi both stated that they would simply have walked out of the match in Kramnik's place.

=== Kramnik protests ===
On October 10, 2006, in a press release Team Kramnik said: "Should the decision of FIDE regarding the fifth game have any influence on the awarding of the World Championship title, with Mr. Topalov receiving the title after being granted a free point for the unplayed game, I will not recognize Mr. Topalov as World Champion under these conditions, and I will take legal action against FIDE at the end of the World Championship."

Since Kramnik won the match, this situation did not happen.

=== Later allegations ===
On October 4, Topalov's manager, Silvio Danailov, issued a press release that identified what it labeled "coincidence statistics" showing the percentage of times that Kramnik played a move that would be recommended by Chessbase's Fritz 9 chess playing software in that position (about 78% on average).

GM Susan Polgar, who did not believe Kramnik was using computer assistance, characterized this as "another black eye for Danailov and chess. Even if he believes that it is true, he should complain to the committee and not through a press release. This is unprofessional and unacceptable."

At the press conference following Game 7, Kramnik commented on the second game where the Fritz analysis had shown a match with 87% of Kramnik's moves. Kramnik said, "A proper analysis must take into consideration that in the second game we both blundered a mate in three! First of all, this 87% is total nonsense – everything depends on the time allotted to the engine for analyzing a given position. Secondly, Topalov's percentages in San Luis, for example, were even higher."

A statistical analysis by University at Buffalo professor Kenneth Regan preliminarily found no "determinative evidence" (i.e., proof of causation) that Kramnik cheated. Regan stresses that this lack of evidence does not prove Kramnik did not cheat, only that the alleged high match between Kramnik's moves and Fritz's is explainable without needing to invoke computer assistance.

In an interview with the Spanish daily ABC published on 14 December 2006, Topalov alleged that Kramnik had cheated with computer help during the match, that network cables had been found in the bathroom ceiling, that threats were issued, and that he felt physically unsafe during the match.

== Aftermath ==
Kramnik, as the winner of the match, earned the FIDE World Champion slot in the World Chess Championship 2007, an eight-player, double round-robin tournament. The loser of the match, Topalov, was eliminated from the 2007 World Championship cycle. Despite this, Topalov's manager was quoted after the match as saying "FIDE regulations allow every world champion that has lost the title to challenge the title holder. The total prize fund is 1.5 million dollars. We will find this money and will request the game to take place in Sofia. We will offer an exact date, 3rd of March 2007." When FIDE announced plans for the 2007–2009 World Championship cycle, it was confirmed that Topalov was excluded from the 2007 tournament, but he (along with Kramnik) was given special privileges for the 2008 and 2009 cycle.

The allegations of cheating seriously damaged relations between Kramnik and Topalov. Nine years after the match, in 2015, Kramnik stated in an interview that he does not respect Topalov as a person and will not shake hands with him. As of 2017, Kramnik and Topalov still refused to shake hands in their encounters. Their rival scores after 2006 are in Kramnik's favour in classical chess (+4, -3, =3 as of May 2021), and despite their rivalry, their games are still of very high quality. Notable games include their encounter at the 2008 Corus tournament featuring Topalov's sacrifice 12.Nxf7.
