= Classical World Chess Championship 2000 =

Chess match between Garry Kasparov and Vladimir Kramnik

- Riverside Studios, Hammersmith, London, United Kingdom
	Defending champion	Challenger
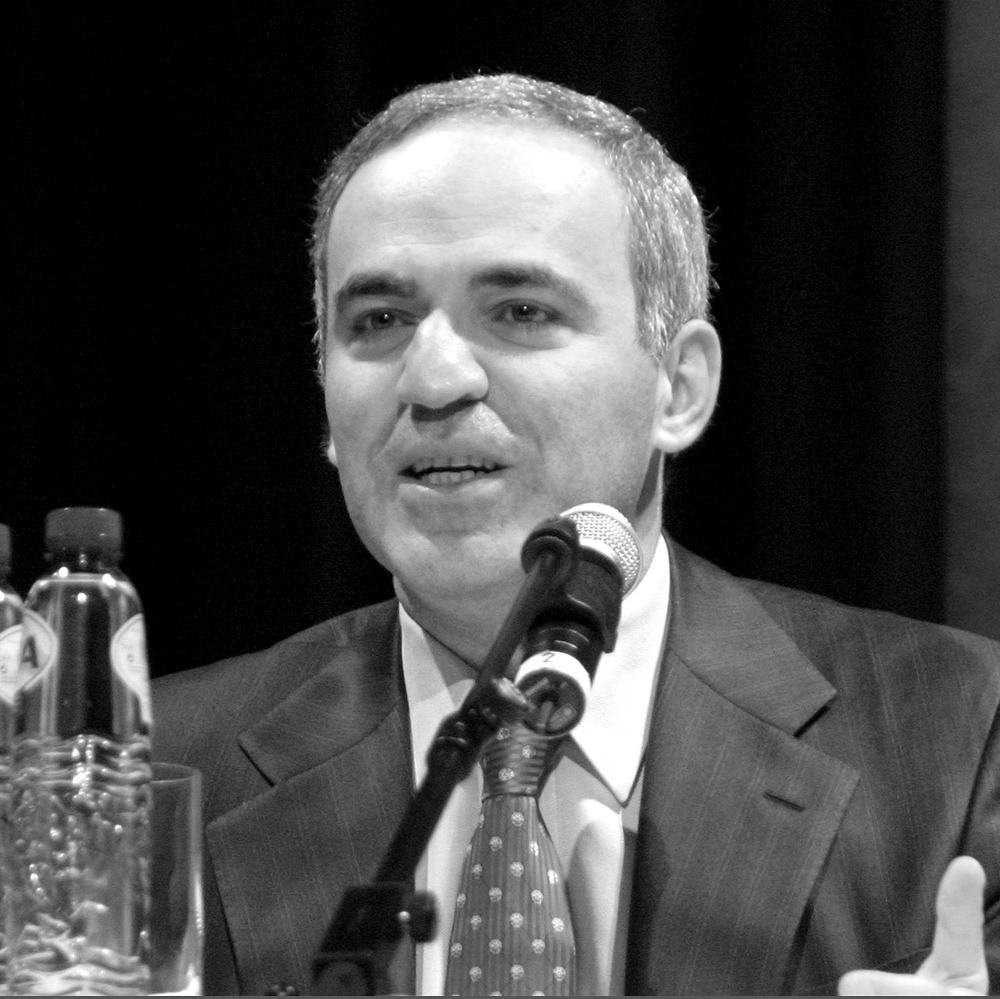
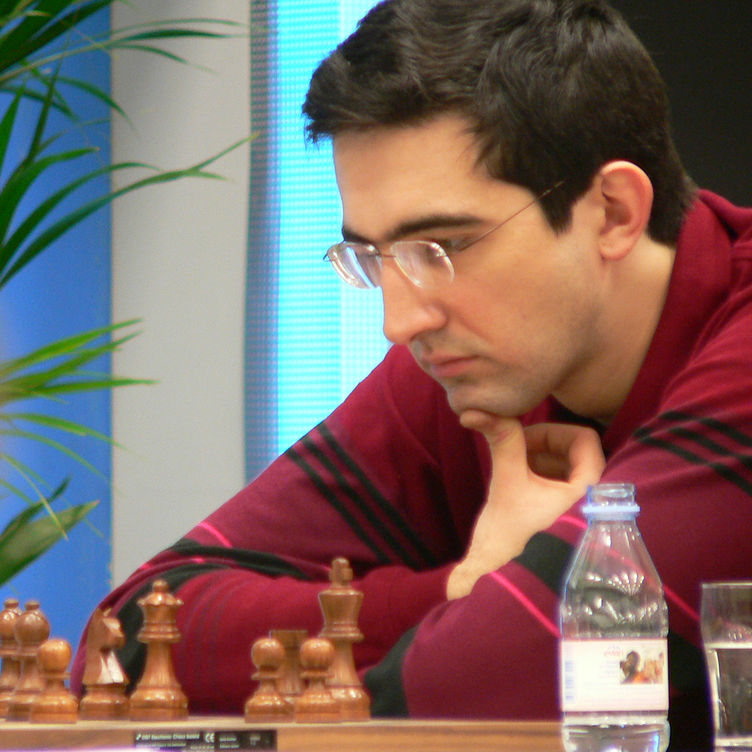
	Garry Kasparov	Vladimir Kramnik
	(Russia) Garry Kasparov	(Russia) Vladimir Kramnik
6½	Scores	8½
	Born 13 April 1963; 37 years old	Born 25 June 1975; 25 years old
	Winner of the 1995 Classical World Chess Championship	Rating list (after failed negotiations with Alexei Shirov and Viswanathan Anand)
	Rating: 2849 (World No. 1)	Rating: 2772 (World No. 3)

The Classical World Chess Championship 2000, known at the time as the Braingames World Chess Championships, was held from 8 October 2000 – 4 November 2000 in London, United Kingdom. Garry Kasparov, the defending champion, played Vladimir Kramnik. The match was played in a best-of-16-games format, with Kramnik defeating the heavily favoured Kasparov. Kramnik won the match with two wins, 13 draws and no losses. To the supporters of the lineal world championship, Kramnik became the 14th world chess champion.

== Background ==
Following the split in the world chess championship in 1993, there were two rival world titles: the official FIDE world title, and the PCA world title held by Garry Kasparov. The rationale behind Kasparov's title was that he had not been defeated in a match, but in fact had defeated the rightful challenger Nigel Short in 1993, so FIDE had no power to strip the title from him.

The PCA then held Interzonal and Candidates matches from 1993 to 1995, and Kasparov successfully defended his PCA title in 1995 against Viswanathan Anand.

The PCA folded in 1996. The initial contract with Intel had expired. Kasparov was looking for a new sponsor, but had not been able to find one. Kasparov still claimed he was the rightful world champion, however, so Kasparov looked for other ways to select his next challenger.

== Candidates match ==
Without the sponsorship of the PCA, Kasparov found he was unable to organise a series of qualifying matches to choose a challenger. Eventually in 1998, he announced that, based on their ratings and results, Anand and Vladimir Kramnik were clearly the next two best players in the world, and that they would play a match to decide who would challenge for Kasparov's title.

Anand, however, as a participant in the FIDE world championship cycle, believed he was contractually obligated to not participate in a rival cycle and declined the offer. So instead a match was organised between Kramnik and Alexei Shirov, from 24 May to 5 June 1998 in Cazorla, Spain. Shirov was chosen because he was next in the PCA rating list, and because of his strong performance at the Linares 1998 super tournament.

Despite being the underdog, Shirov won the match with two wins, seven draws and no losses.

World Chess Championship Candidates Match (1998)
	Rating	1	2	3	4	5	6	7	8	9	Total
Vladimir Kramnik (Russia)	2790	½	½	½	0	½	½	½	½	0	3½
Alexei Shirov (Spain)	2710	½	½	½	1	½	½	½	½	1	5½

== Negotiations ==
However, during 1998 Kasparov, Shirov and sponsors were unable to come to an agreement. Shirov rejected one offer of a match in California, but believed rejecting this offer did not mean waiving his rights for a match. In December 1998, there was still talk of organising a Kasparov–Shirov match.

In February 1999, Kasparov abandoned plans for a match with Shirov and pursued a match with Anand instead, on the basis that Anand was second to Kasparov on the ratings list. Negotiations for a 1999 match failed, as did negotiations in 2000, with Anand expressing dissatisfaction with the contract. In March 2000 it was announced that negotiations with Anand had failed and so Kasparov would negotiate a match with the next player in the ratings list—Kramnik. This time negotiations were successful, and the company Braingames was formed, headed by Raymond Keene, to finance a Kasparov–Kramnik match in October 2000.

Shirov was aggrieved, and even in 2006 maintained that Kramnik was not a valid world champion. Kramnik had a far better record against Kasparov than Shirov did (a point Kasparov emphasised when the match was announced in April 2000). In the years that followed, Kasparov maintained an overwhelming plus score in his individual games against Shirov.

== Championship Match ==
Classical World Chess Championship Match 2000
	Rating	1	2	3	4	5	6	7	8	9	10	11	12	13	14	15	Total
Garry Kasparov (Russia)	2849	½	0	½	½	½	½	½	½	½	0	½	½	½	½	½	6½
Vladimir Kramnik (Russia)	2772	½	1	½	½	½	½	½	½	½	1	½	½	½	½	½	8½

=== Match games ===
	White	Black	Date	Result	Moves	Winner	Standing	Opening	Notes / Reference
1	Kasparov	Kramnik	8 October	½–½	25		½–½	C67 Ruy Lopez	
2	Kramnik	Kasparov	10 October	1–0	40	Kramnik	Kramnik leads 1½–½	D85 Grünfeld Defence	Kramnik uncorked a novelty in Grünfeld Defence, after which Kasparov did not use the Grünfeld
3	Kasparov	Kramnik	12 October	½–½	53		Kramnik leads 2–1	C67 Ruy Lopez	
4	Kramnik	Kasparov	14 October	½–½	74		Kramnik leads 2½–1½	D27 Queen's Gambit	
5	Kasparov	Kramnik	15 October	½–½	24		Kramnik leads 3–2	A34 English Opening	
6	Kramnik	Kasparov	17 October	½–½	66		Kramnik leads 3½–2½	D27 Queen's Gambit	
7	Kasparov	Kramnik	19 October	½–½	11		Kramnik leads 4–3	A32 English Opening	
8	Kramnik	Kasparov	21 October	½–½	38		Kramnik leads 4½–3½	E32 Nimzo-Indian Defence	
9	Kasparov	Kramnik	22 October	½–½	33		Kramnik leads 5–4	C67 Ruy Lopez	
10	Kramnik	Kasparov	24 October	1–0	25	Kramnik	Kramnik leads 6–4	E54 Nimzo-Indian Defence	
11	Kasparov	Kramnik	26 October	½–½	41		Kramnik leads 6½–4½	C78 Ruy Lopez	
12	Kramnik	Kasparov	28 October	½–½	33		Kramnik leads 7–5	E55 Nimzo-Indian Defence	
13	Kasparov	Kramnik	29 October	½–½	14		Kramnik leads 7½–5½	C67 Ruy Lopez	
14	Kramnik	Kasparov	31 October	½–½	57		Kramnik leads 8–6	A30 English Opening	
15	Kasparov	Kramnik	2 November	½–½	38		Kramnik wins 8½–6½	E05 Catalan Opening	

=== Commentary ===
Berlin Defence after 8...Kxd8

Position: a8 black rook, c8 black bishop, d8 black king, f8 black bishop, h8 black rook, a7 black pawn, b7 black pawn, c7 black pawn, f7 black pawn, g7 black pawn, h7 black pawn, c6 black pawn, e5 white pawn, f5 black knight, f3 white knight, a2 white pawn, b2 white pawn, c2 white pawn, f2 white pawn, g2 white pawn, h2 white pawn, a1 white rook, b1 white knight, c1 white bishop, f1 white rook, g1 white king

This position occurred four times—in games 1, 3, 9 and 13—and each time Kramnik (Black) was able to draw.

According to Kasparov, Kramnik's victory stemmed from his superior opening preparation. He relied on the Berlin Defence of the Ruy Lopez to defuse Kasparov's 1.e4, an opening Kasparov was not prepared for.

Kramnik also won game 2 with a new idea for White in Kasparov's favourite Grünfeld Defence, which Kramnik discovered during training with Boris Gelfand a year before the match. He won game 10 due to deep knowledge of 4.e3 variation by Joël Lautier and Evgeny Bareev, his seconds; that variation was chosen because of Kasparov's unimpressive score with it. He also came close to winning games 4 and 6 with white.

Yasser Seirawan remarked that he had no explanation for the result except that Kramnik played the best chess of his life, and also that he personally knew that Kasparov was going through a divorce which might have affected his game.

== Aftermath ==
The Berlin Defence surged in popularity after this match, becoming a reliable drawing weapon.

Kramnik defended his title in the Classical World Chess Championship 2004 against Peter Leko. The world championship remained split until 2006, when Kramnik defeated FIDE champion Veselin Topalov in a reunification match, becoming the undisputed world chess champion.

== See also ==
- List of chess games between Kasparov and Kramnik
