= Classical World Chess Championship 2004 =

Chess match between Vladimir Kramnik and Peter Leko

	Defending champion	Challenger
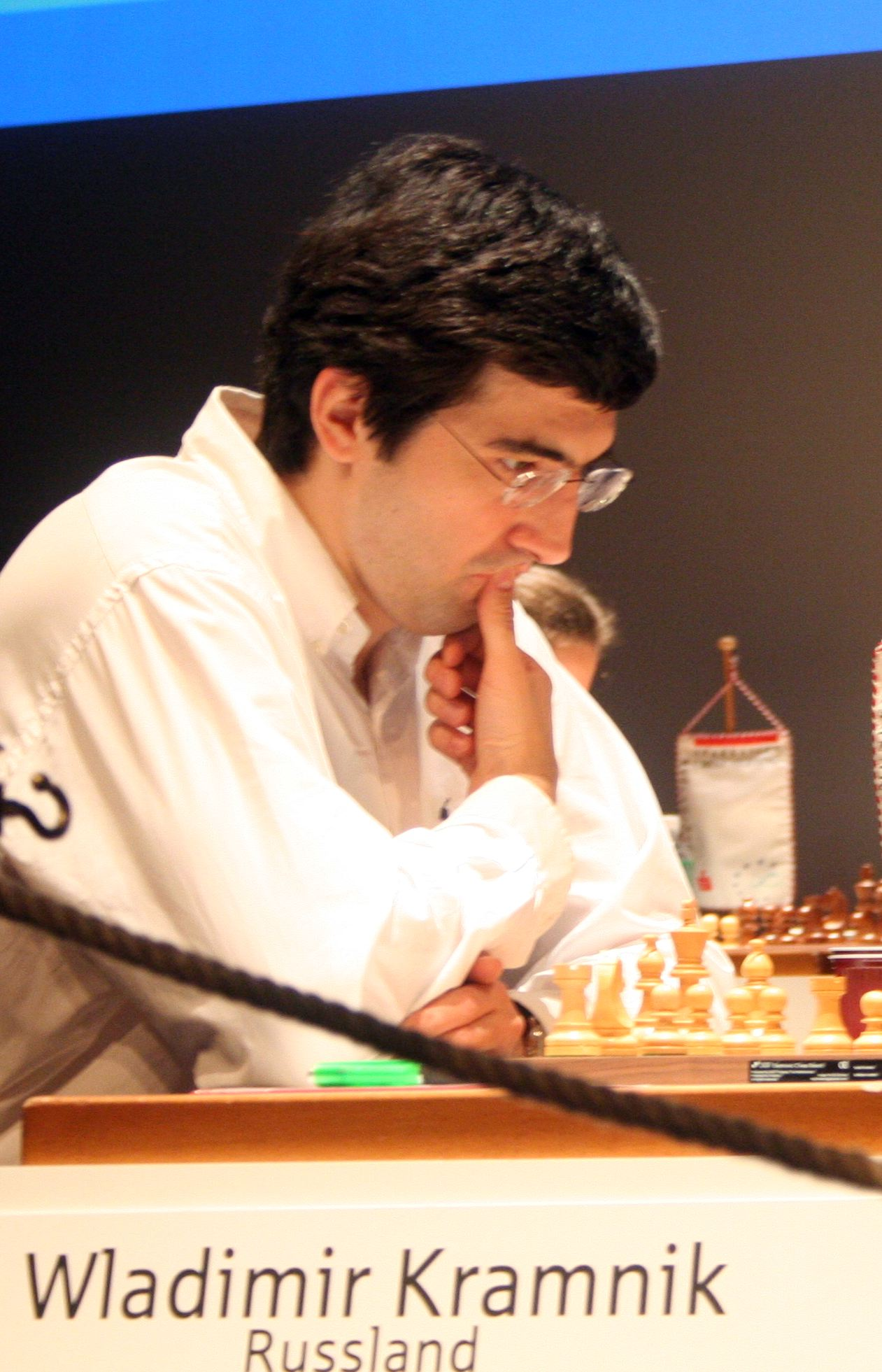
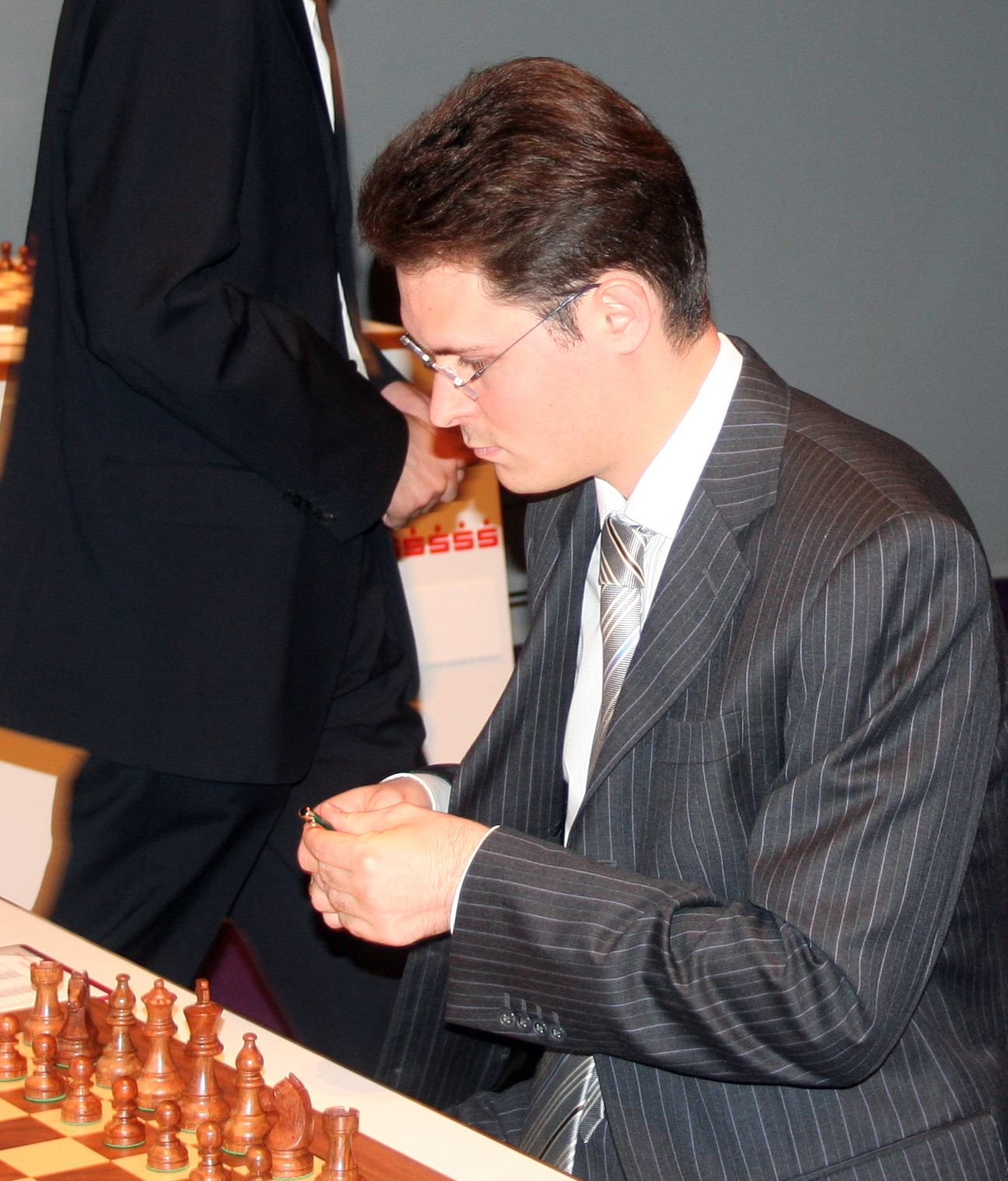
	Vladimir Kramnik	Peter Leko
	(Russia) Vladimir Kramnik	(Hungary) Peter Leko
7	Scores	7
	Born 25 June 1975; 29 years old	Born 8 September 1979; 25 years old
	Winner of the 2000 Classical World Chess Championship	Winner of the 2002 Candidates Tournament
	Rating: 2770 (World No. 3)	Rating: 2741 (World No. 5)

The Classical World Chess Championship 2004 was held from September 25, 2004, to October 18, 2004, in Brissago, Switzerland. Vladimir Kramnik, the defending champion, played Peter Leko, the challenger, in a fourteen-game match.

The match ended 7–7, each player scoring two wins. Kramnik retained his title under the rules of the match.

== Background ==
Garry Kasparov's split from FIDE in 1993 resulted in two lines of world chess champions. There was the "Classical" world champion, the title that passes on to a player only when he beats the previous world champion. This was held by Kasparov, until he was defeated by Kramnik in the Classical World Chess Championship 2000. There was also the "Official" FIDE world champion who, at the time of this match, was Rustam Kasimdzhanov.

The split World Champion title led to calls for a reunification. After negotiations, all parties agreed to the "Prague Agreement", whereby the winner of this match (the "Classical" World Champion) would play the winner of a match between Kasparov and the FIDE World Champion, and the winner would be the World Champion. These other matches never took place, but the titles were later unified at the FIDE World Chess Championship 2006.

The Candidates Tournament was held in July 2002, and was won by Peter Leko. However, there were many delays in finding a sponsor for the Kramnik–Leko match, and it was not played until September and October 2004.

== 2002 Candidates Tournament ==
The July 2002 Dortmund Sparkassen Chess Meeting acted as the Candidates Tournament to determine the challenger to Kramnik's title. However, not all other top-ranked players were present. World number 1 Garry Kasparov declined his invitation, instead insisting that he deserved a rematch with Kramnik based on his tournament results in 2001. Two other top 10 players — world number 3 and 2000 FIDE World Champion Viswanathan Anand, and world number 8 Vasyl Ivanchuk — declined their invitations out of loyalty to the rival FIDE world championship. FIDE World Champion Ruslan Ponomariov (and world number 7) also did not participate. Apart from these four players and Kramnik, the competitors were the 7 highest rated players in the world, plus Christopher Lutz (44th in the world in the January 2002 list) as a player from the host country.

Leko won the Candidates Tournament:

Group 1
		Rating	1	2	3	4	Total
1	Alexei Shirov (Spain)	2697	-	½ ½	1 ½	1 ½	4
2	Veselin Topalov (Bulgaria)	2745	½ ½	-	½ 1	½ 1	4
3	Boris Gelfand (Israel)	2710	0 ½	½ 0	-	1 ½	2½
4	Christopher Lutz (Germany)	2655	0 ½	½ 0	0 ½	-	1½

Shirov won a two-game playoff 1½-½ to be placed first ahead of Topalov.

Group 2
		Rating	1	2	3	4	Total
1	Evgeny Bareev (Russia)	2726	-	1 0	½ ½	1 1	4
2	Peter Leko (Hungary)	2722	0 1	-	½ 1	½ ½	3½
3	Michael Adams (England)	2752	½ ½	½ 0	-	½ ½	2½
4	Alexander Morozevich (Russia)	2716	0 0	½ ½	½ ½	-	2

The top two from each group advanced to the knock-out stage where mini-matches (best of 4) were played, with a 2-game rapid chess playoff in the event of a tie.

Semifinals
1	(Hungary) Peter Leko	2½
4	(Spain) Alexei Shirov	½
3	(Bulgaria) Veselin Topalov	3½
2	(Russia) Evgeny Bareev	2½

Final
(Hungary) Peter Leko	2½
(Bulgaria) Veselin Topalov	1½

Topalov–Bareev was tied 2–2; Topalov won the rapid playoff 1½–½.

== 2004 Championship Match ==
Classical World Chess Championship Match 2004
	Rating	1	2	3	4	5	6	7	8	9	10	11	12	13	14	Total
Peter Leko (Hungary)	2741 (+21)	0	½	½	½	1	½	½	1	½	½	½	½	½	0	7
Vladimir Kramnik (Russia)	2770 (−29)	1	½	½	½	0	½	½	0	½	½	½	½	½	1	7

=== Highlights ===
- Game 1 – as Black, Kramnik sacrifices his queen for rook and bishop, and outplays Leko in the ending to take the lead.
- Game 5 – Leko, as White, goes into an ending a pawn up with some winning chances, and outplays Kramnik to win, and level the match.
- Game 8 – Leko, as Black in the Marshall Attack, plays into a line prepared by Kramnik's team, and finds the refutation over the board, to take a one-point lead. Chessbase wrote, "Many questions were answered by today's eighth match game. Does Leko have what it takes to beat Kramnik in a match? Is Kramnik's preparation simply unbeatable? Why don't many top players allow the Marshall Gambit with white? (That's 'yes', 'no', and 'because no matter how well prepared you are you may get killed'.)"
- Game 9 – Kramnik's second Evgeny Bareev later explained that, in the night before the game, Kramnik had received some medication from a doctor because of blood pressure and sleep problems. He took the pill during game 9, after which he could not play anymore, offered a quick draw, skipped the press conference and went to a hospital.
- Game 12 – Leko switches to the Caro–Kann Defence. Kramnik has winning chances, but Leko defends well and, with both players short on time, Leko offers a draw on move 34.
- Game 13 – Kramnik plays the Benoni, in a surprise attempt to win with black, but the game is drawn.
- Game 14 – Kramnik wins the final game to tie the match and retain his title.
