= Hoogovens Wijk aan Zee Chess Tournament 1983 =

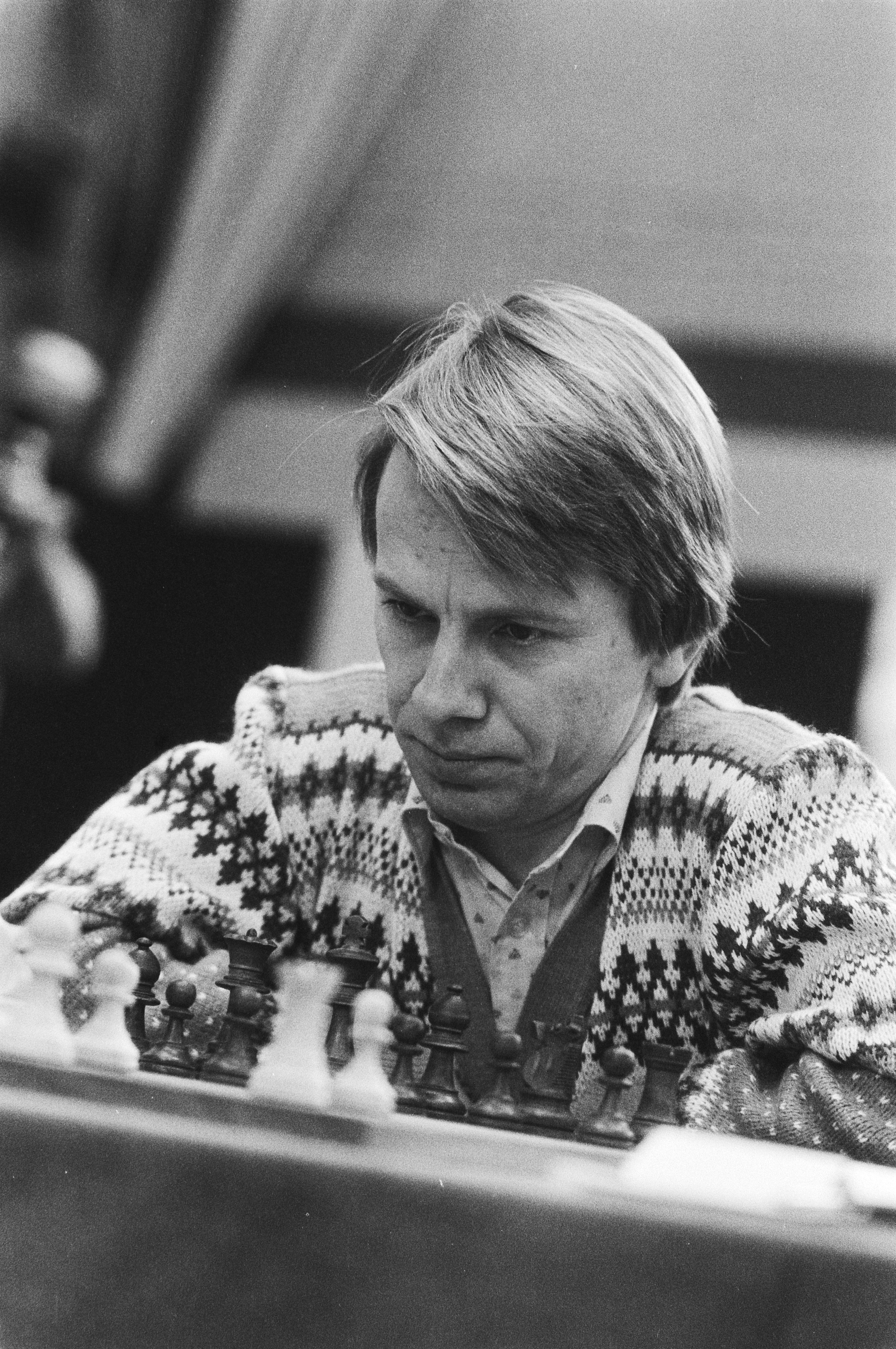
- Ulf Andersson
- Venue: Wijk aan Zee

The Hoogovens Wijk aan Zee Steel Chess Tournament 1983 was the 45th edition of the Wijk aan Zee Chess Tournament. It was held in Wijk aan Zee in January 1983. The tournament was won by Ulf Andersson.

45th Hoogovens tournament, group A, January 1983, Wijk aan Zee, Netherlands, Category XII (2544)
	Player	Rating	1	2	3	4	5	6	7	8	9	10	11	12	13	14	Total	TPR	Place
1	GM Ulf Andersson (Sweden)	2635		½	½	1	½	½	1	½	½	½	1	1	½	1	9	2678	1
2	GM Zoltán Ribli (Hungary)	2595	½		1	½	½	½	½	½	1	½	1	1	½	½	8½	2650	2
3	GM Vlastimil Hort (Czechoslovakia)	2585	½	0		½	½	½	0	1	1	½	1	½	1	1	8	2628	3–4
4	GM Walter Browne (United States)	2540	0	½	½		½	½	1	1	½	½	½	1	½	1	8	2631	3–4
5	GM John Nunn (England)	2570	½	½	½	½		½	½	½	1	½	0	1	½	1	7½	2599	5
6	GM Yasser Seirawan (United States)	2600	½	½	½	½	½		½	½	0	1	1	0	½	1	7	2569	6
7	GM Krunoslav Hulak (Yugoslavia)	2515	0	½	1	0	½	½		0	½	1	1	½	½	½	6½	2546	7
8	GM Hans Ree (Netherlands)	2500	½	½	0	0	½	½	1		½	½	0	1	0	½	5½	2490	8–10
9	GM Friðrik Ólafsson (Iceland)	2495	½	0	0	½	0	1	½	½		1	0	0	1	½	5½	2491	8–10
10	IM Peter Scheeren (Netherlands)	2445	½	½	½	½	½	0	0	½	0		½	½	1	½	5½	2495	8–10
11	GM Viktor Korchnoi (Switzerland)	2600	0	0	0	½	1	0	0	1	1	½		1	1	0	5	2453	11–12
12	GM John van der Wiel (Netherlands)	2530	0	0	½	0	0	1	½	0	1	½	0		½	1	5	2458	11–12
13	GM Jon Speelman (England)	2570	½	½	0	½	½	½	½	1	0	0	0	½		0	4½	2432	13–14
14	GM Adam Kuligowski (Poland)	2435	0	½	0	0	0	0	½	½	½	½	1	0	1		4½	2442	13–14

45th Hoogovens tournament, group B, January 1983, Wijk aan Zee, Netherlands
	Player	1	2	3	4	5	6	7	8	9	10	Total	Place
1	IM Gert Ligterink (Netherlands)		1	½	0	½	½	1	1	1	1	6½	1
2	Marinus Kuijf (Netherlands)	0		1	½	1	1	0	½	½	1	5½	2
3	Pavel Votruba (Czechoslovakia)	½	0		½	½	0	1	1	½	1	5	3–5
4	IM Cornelis van Wijgerden (Netherlands)	1	½	½		½	0	0	1	½	1	5	3–5
5	IM Hans Böhm (Netherlands)	½	0	½	½		0	1	1	1	½	5	3–5
6	IM Zenón Franco Ocampos (Paraguay)	½	0	1	1	1		0	½	½	0	4½	6–7
7	IM Paul van der Sterren (Netherlands)	0	1	0	1	0	1		½	1	0	4½	6–7
8	IM Francisco Trois (Brazil)	0	½	0	0	0	½	½		1	1	3½	8
9	Friso Nijboer (Netherlands)	0	½	½	½	0	½	0	0		1	3	9
10	Peter John Sowray (England)	0	0	0	0	½	1	1	0	0		2½	10
