= Hoogovens Wijk aan Zee Chess Tournament 1988 =

Chess tournament

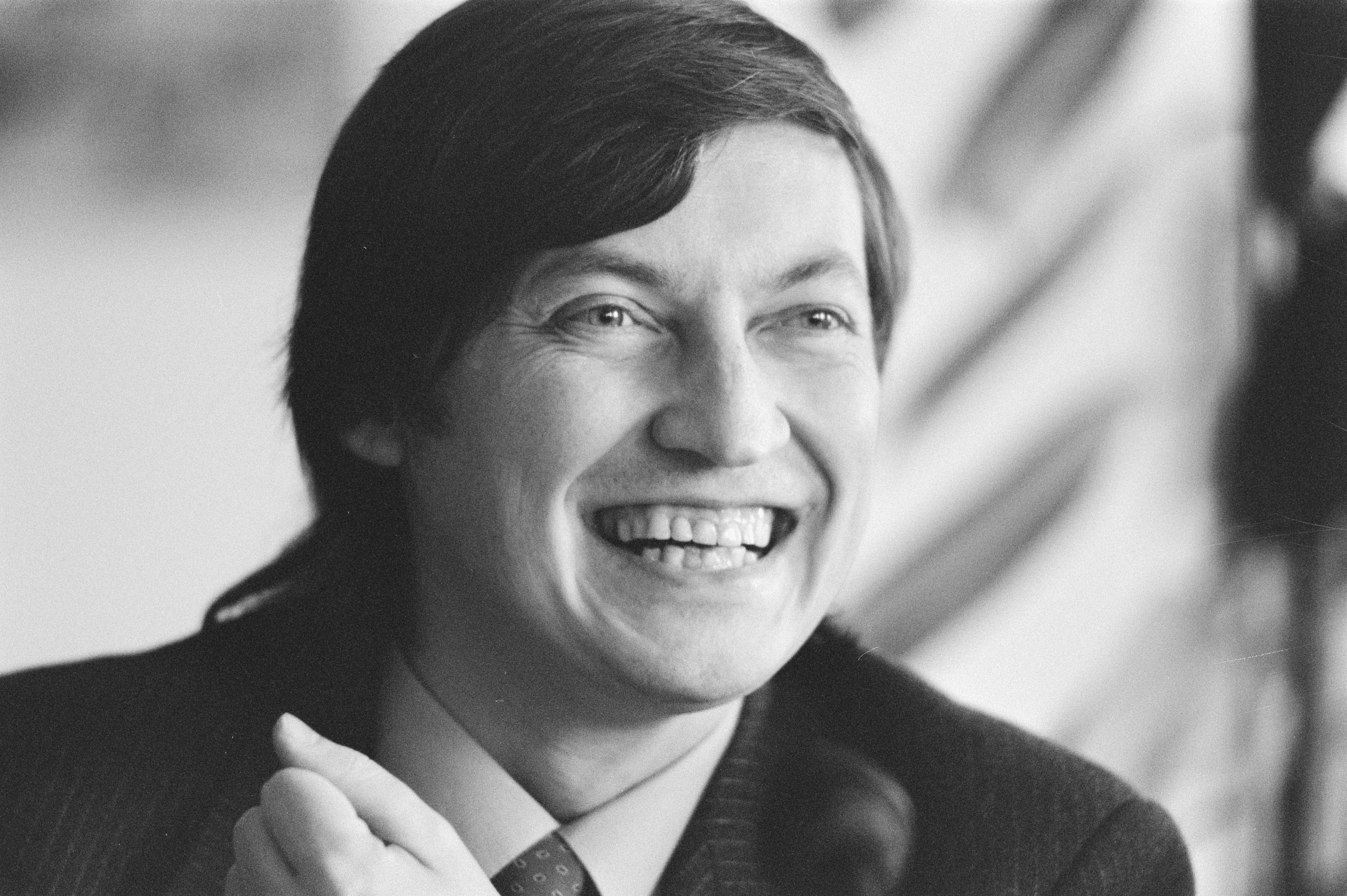
- Anatoly Karpov at the press conference
- Venue: Wijk aan Zee

The Hoogovens Wijk aan Zee Steel Chess Tournament 1988 was the 50th edition of the Wijk aan Zee Chess Tournament. It was held in Wijk aan Zee in January 1988. The tournament was won by Anatoly Karpov, the first of his two wins.

50th Hoogovens tournament, group A, 8–24 January 1988, Wijk aan Zee, Netherlands, Category XIII (2572)
	Player	Rating	1	2	3	4	5	6	7	8	9	10	11	12	13	14	Total	TPR	Place
1	Anatoly Karpov (Soviet Union)	2715		½	1	½	½	½	1	0	½	1	½	1	1	1	9	2702	1
2	Ulf Andersson (Sweden)	2605	½		½	1	½	½	½	½	1	½	½	1	1	½	8½	2679	2
3	Kiril Georgiev (Bulgaria)	2595	0	½		½	½	½	½	1	0	½	1	1	1	½	7½	2627	3–4
4	Simen Agdestein (Norway)	2560	½	0	½		½	½	0	1	1	1	1	½	0	1	7½	2630	3–4
5	Mikhail Tal (Soviet Union)	2630	½	½	½	½		1	½	½	½	½	½	½	½	0	6½	2567	5–7
6	Robert Hübner (West Germany)	2595	½	½	½	½	0		½	½	1	½	½	0	1	½	6½	2570	5–7
7	Iván Faragó (Hungary)	2475	0	½	½	1	½	½		½	0	½	½	½	½	1	6½	2579	5–7
8	Predrag Nikolić (Yugoslavia)	2630	1	½	0	0	½	½	½		1	½	½	½	0	½	6	2538	8–10
9	Jeroen Piket (Netherlands)	2470	½	0	1	0	½	0	1	0		½	½	½	1	½	6	2551	8–10
10	Curt Hansen (Denmark)	2560	0	½	½	0	½	½	½	½	½		½	½	½	1	6	2544	8–10
11	Gennadi Sosonko (Netherlands)	2535	½	½	0	0	½	½	½	½	½	½		½	½	½	5½	2518	11–13
12	John van der Wiel (Netherlands)	2555	0	0	0	½	½	1	½	½	½	½	½		½	½	5½	2516	11–13
13	Paul van der Sterren (Netherlands)	2470	0	0	0	1	½	0	½	1	0	½	½	½		1	5½	2523	11–13
14	Ljubomir Ljubojević (Yugoslavia)	2610	0	½	½	0	1	½	0	½	½	0	½	½	0		4½	2459	14
