= Hoogovens Wijk aan Zee Chess Tournament 1991 =

Chess tournament

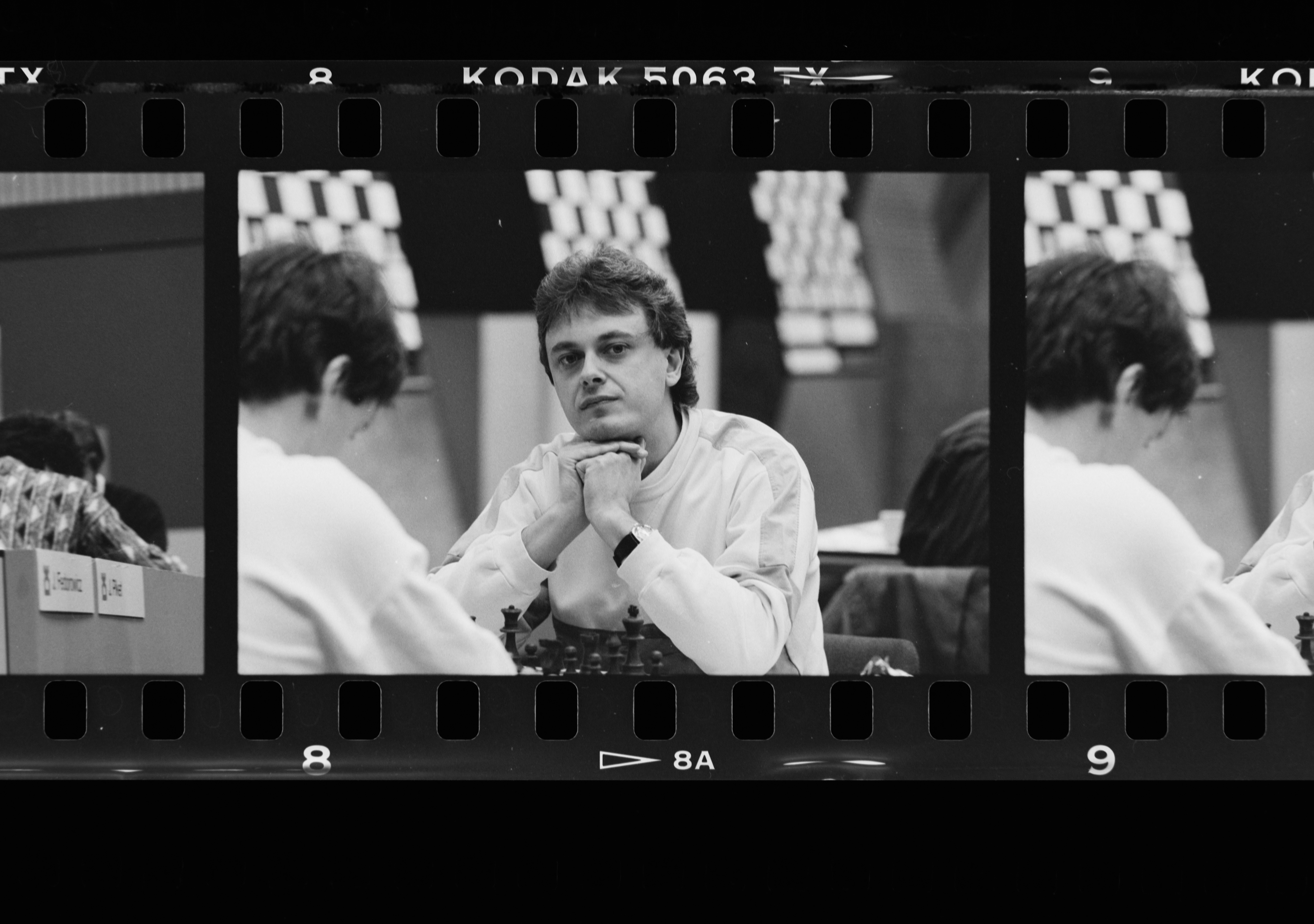
- Winner John Nunn at Hoogovens 1991
- Venue: Wijk aan Zee

The Hoogovens Wijk aan Zee Steel Chess Tournament 1991 was the 53rd edition of the Wijk aan Zee Chess Tournament. It was held in Wijk aan Zee in January 1991 and was won by the previous year's champion John Nunn.

53rd Hoogovens tournament, group A, 17 January – 3 February 1991, Wijk aan Zee, Netherlands, Category XIV (2584)
	Player	Rating	1	2	3	4	5	6	7	8	9	10	11	12	13	14	Total	TPR	Place
1	John Nunn (England)	2600		½	½	½	1	½	0	½	½	½	1	1	1	1	8½	2693	1
2	Michael Adams (England)	2600	½		½	½	1	0	1	½	1	1	½	1	0	½	8	2670	2–5
3	Alexander Chernin (Soviet Union)	2610	½	½		½	½	½	½	½	1	½	½	1	1	½	8	2669	2–5
4	Alexander Khalifman (Soviet Union)	2640	½	½	½		0	½	½	1	½	½	1	½	1	1	8	2667	2–5
5	Curt Hansen (Denmark)	2565	0	0	½	1		½	½	½	1	½	1	½	1	1	8	2673	2–5
6	Jeroen Piket (Netherlands)	2550	½	1	½	½	½		1	1	½	½	0	0	½	1	7½	2644	6–8
7	Valery Salov (Soviet Union)	2645	1	0	½	½	½	0		½	½	1	½	1	1	½	7½	2637	6–8
8	Yasser Seirawan (United States)	2595	½	½	½	0	½	0	½		½	1	1	1	½	1	7½	2640	6–8
9	John van der Wiel (Netherlands)	2530	½	0	0	½	0	½	½	½		½	½	½	½	1	5½	2531	9
10	Joël Lautier (France)	2550	½	0	½	½	½	½	0	0	½		1	½	½	0	5	2500	10–12
11	John Fedorowicz (United States)	2555	0	½	½	0	0	1	½	0	½	0		½	½	1	5	2500	10–12
12	Zdenko Kožul (Yugoslavia)	2580	0	0	0	½	½	1	0	0	½	½	½		½	1	5	2498	10–12
13	Ivan Sokolov (Yugoslavia)	2570	0	1	0	0	0	½	0	½	½	½	½	½		½	4½	2475	13
14	Helgi Ólafsson (Iceland)	2590	0	½	½	0	0	0	½	0	0	1	0	0	½		3	2373	14
