= Hoogovens Wijk aan Zee Chess Tournament 1987 =

Chess tournament

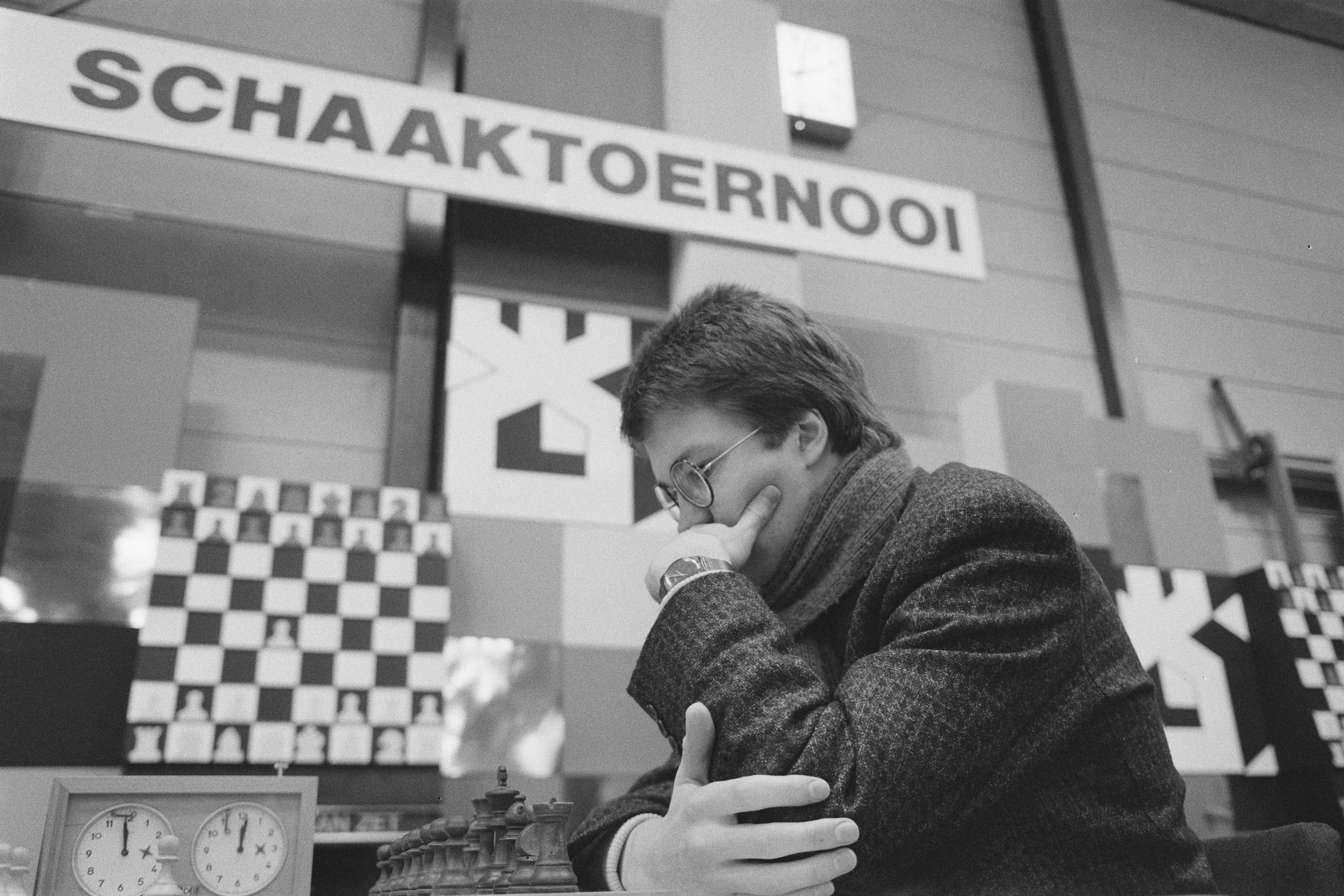
- Joint winner Nigel Short
- Venue: Wijk aan Zee

The Hoogovens Wijk aan Zee Steel Chess Tournament 1987 was the 49th edition of the Wijk aan Zee Chess Tournament. It was held in Wijk aan Zee in January 1987. The tournament was won by 1986 champion Nigel Short and Viktor Korchnoi, earning his fourth title.

49th Hoogovens tournament, group A, 15 January – 4 February 1987, Wijk aan Zee, Netherlands, Category XIII (2556)
	Player	Rating	1	2	3	4	5	6	7	8	9	10	11	12	13	14	Total	TPR	Place
1	Nigel Short (England)	2615		1	½	½	½	½	½	½	1	1	1	1	½	1	9½	2726	1–2
2	Viktor Korchnoi (Switzerland)	2625	0		½	1	1	½	½	1	½	1	½	1	1	1	9½	2725	1–2
3	Ulf Andersson (Sweden)	2600	½	½		½	1	½	½	1	½	½	½	1	½	½	8	2639	3
4	Jesús Nogueiras (Cuba)	2565	½	0	½		½	½	½	½	1	½	½	1	½	1	7½	2612	4
5	Alonso Zapata (Colombia)	2505	½	0	0	½		1	1	1	0	1	½	0	½	1	7	2589	5–6
6	Anthony Miles (England)	2565	½	½	½	½	0		½	0	1	½	½	½	1	1	7	2584	5–6
7	Gennadi Sosonko (Netherlands)	2530	½	½	½	½	0	½		½	½	½	½	½	1	½	6½	2558	7–9
8	Paul van der Sterren (Netherlands)	2520	½	0	0	½	0	1	½		1	½	½	0	1	1	6½	2558	7–9
9	Ljubomir Ljubojević (Yugoslavia)	2620	½	½	0	1	0	0	½	0		½	½	1	1	1	6½	2551	7–9
10	Helgi Ólafsson (Iceland)	2550	0	0	½	½	0	½	½	½	½		½	½	1	1	6	2527	10
11	John van der Wiel (Netherlands)	2520	0	½	½	½	½	½	½	½	½	½		1	0	0	5½	2501	11
12	Krunoslav Hulak (Yugoslavia)	2540	0	0	0	0	1	½	½	1	0	½	0		½	½	4½	2447	12–13
13	Glenn Flear (England)	2495	½	0	½	½	½	0	0	0	0	0	1	½		1	4½	2450	12–13
14	Lev Gutman (Israel)	2530	0	0	½	0	0	0	½	0	0	0	1	½	0		2½	2307	14
