= Hoogovens Wijk aan Zee Chess Tournament 1994 =

Chess tournament

Tournament information
- Sport: Chess
- Location: Wijk aan Zee, the Netherlands
- Month played: January 1994

Final positions
- Champion: Predrag Nikolić
- Runner-up: Sergei Tiviakov

The Hoogovens Wijk aan Zee Steel Chess Tournament 1994 was the 56th edition of the Hoogovens Wijk aan Zee Chess Tournament. It was held in Wijk aan Zee in January 1994 and was won by Predrag Nikolić.

The tournament reverted to its traditional round-robin format, after switching to knockout matches for the first time in 1993, although there were only ten players competing in the A-section.

56th Hoogovens tournament, group A, January 1994, Wijk aan Zee, Cat. XIV (2600)
	Player	Rating	1	2	3	4	5	6	7	8	9	10	Total	TPR	Place
1	Predrag Nikolić (Bosnia and Herzegovina)	2625		0	½	1	½	1	1	1	1	1	7	2817	1
2	Sergei Tiviakov (Russia)	2630	1		1	0	½	1	0	½	1	½	5½	2676	2
3	Peter Leko (Hungary)	2545	½	0		½	½	½	½	1	1	½	5	2649	3–5
4	Jeroen Piket (Netherlands)	2605	0	1	½		0	1	½	½	½	1	5	2642	3–5
5	Curt Hansen (Denmark)	2580	½	½	½	1		0	½	1	0	1	5	2645	3–5
6	Loek van Wely (Netherlands)	2570	0	0	½	0	1		1	½	0	1	4	2560	6–7
7	Ilya Smirin (Israel)	2615	0	1	½	½	½	0		½	1	0	4	2555	6–7
8	Iván Morovic (Chile)	2605	0	½	0	½	0	½	½		1	½	3½	2519	8–9
9	Ivan Sokolov (Bosnia and Herzegovina)	2650	0	0	0	½	1	1	0	0		1	3½	2514	8–9
10	John van der Wiel (Netherlands)	2570	0	½	½	0	0	0	1	½	0		2½	2425	10
