= Hoogovens Wijk aan Zee Chess Tournament 1984 =

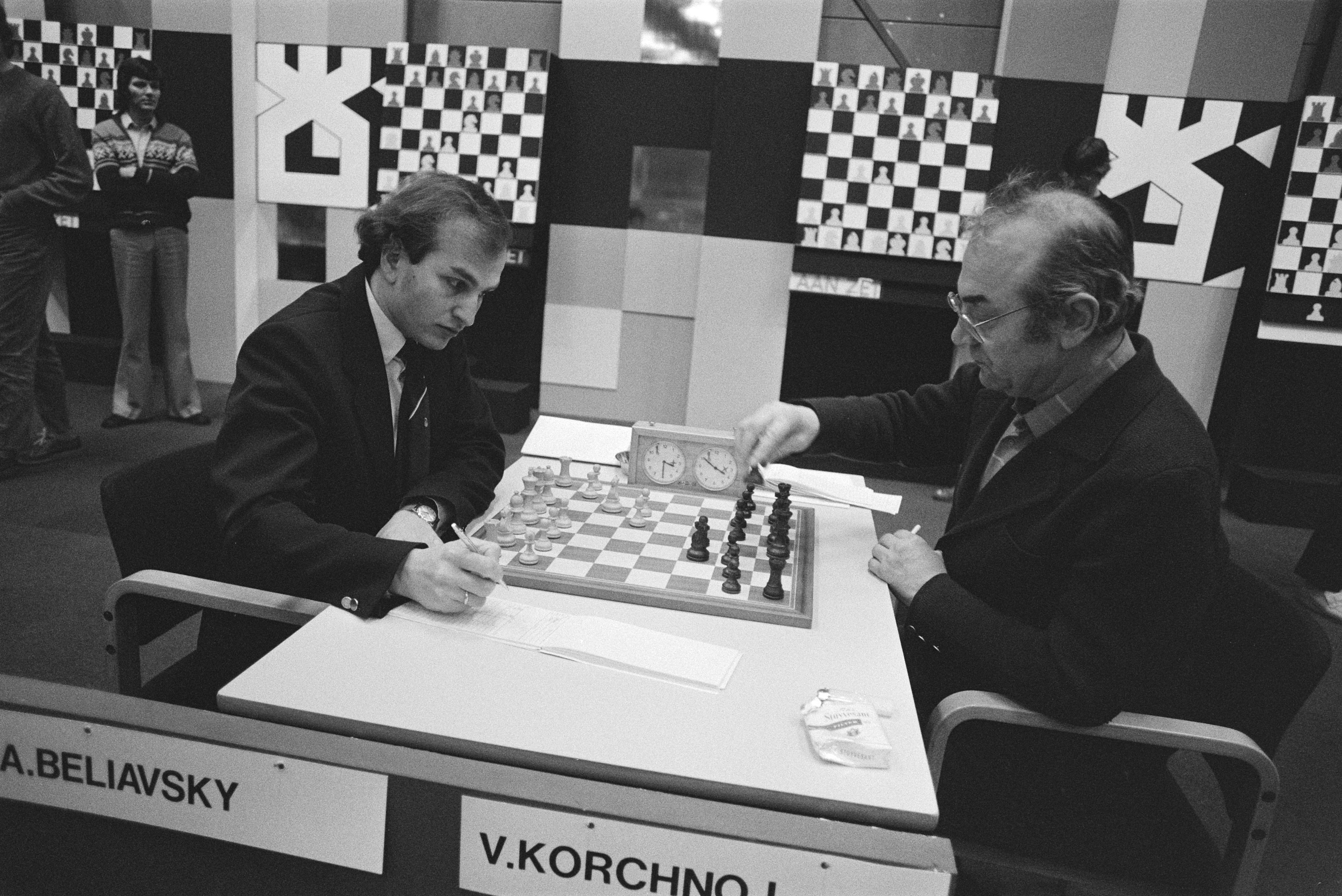
- Beliavsky and Korchnoi, the two eventual winners, face off in round 11
- Venue: Wijk aan Zee

The Hoogovens Wijk aan Zee Steel Chess Tournament 1984 was the 46th edition of the Wijk aan Zee Chess Tournament. It was held in Wijk aan Zee in January 1984. The tournament was won by Alexander Beliavsky and Viktor Korchnoi.

46th Hoogovens tournament, group A, January 1984, Wijk aan Zee, Netherlands, Category XIII (2557)
	Player	Rating	1	2	3	4	5	6	7	8	9	10	11	12	13	14	Total	TPR	Place
1	Alexander Beliavsky (Soviet Union)	2565		½	1	½	½	½	½	1	1	1	1	½	1	1	10	2767	1–2
2	Viktor Korchnoi (Switzerland)	2635	½		1	½	½	½	½	1	1	1	½	1	1	1	10	2762	1–2
3	Predrag Nikolić (Yugoslavia)	2570	0	0		1	½	½	1	0	½	½	1	1	½	1	7½	2613	3
4	Ulf Andersson (Sweden)	2630	½	½	0		½	½	½	½	½	½	½	1	1	½	7	2580	4
5	András Adorján (Hungary)	2570	½	½	½	½		½	½	1	½	0	½	½	½	½	6½	2556	5–9
6	Robert Hübner (West Germany)	2620	½	½	½	½	½		1	0	0	½	0	½	1	1	6½	2552	5–9
7	Vladimir Tukmakov (Soviet Union)	2550	½	½	0	½	½	0		½	½	½	½	½	1	1	6½	2557	5–9
8	Anthony Miles (England)	2615	0	0	1	½	0	1	½		1	½	0	½	1	½	6½	2552	5–9
9	John van der Wiel (Netherlands)	2515	0	0	½	½	½	1	½	0		½	1	½	½	1	6½	2560	5–9
10	Gennadi Sosonko (Netherlands)	2560	0	0	½	½	1	½	½	½	½		½	½	½	½	6	2528	10
11	Hans Ree (Netherlands)	2480	0	½	0	½	½	1	½	1	0	½		0	½	½	5½	2506	11
12	Eugenio Torre (Philippines)	2565	½	0	0	0	½	½	½	½	½	½	1		0	½	5	2469	12
13	Gert Ligterink (Netherlands)	2445	0	0	½	0	½	0	0	0	½	½	½	1		½	4	2424	13
14	Paul van der Sterren (Netherlands)	2475	0	0	0	½	½	0	0	½	0	½	½	½	½		3½	2388	14
