= Hoogovens Wijk aan Zee Chess Tournament 1997 =

Chess tournament

- Venue: Wijk aan Zee

The Hoogovens Wijk aan Zee Steel Chess Tournament 1997 was the 59th edition of the Hoogovens Wijk aan Zee Chess Tournament. It was held in Wijk aan Zee in January 1997 and was won by Valery Salov.

59th Hoogovens tournament, group A, 18 January – 2 February 1997, Wijk aan Zee, Cat. XVI (2635)
	Player	Rating	1	2	3	4	5	6	7	8	9	10	11	12	13	14	Total	TPR	Place
1	Valery Salov (Russia)	2665		0	½	1	1	½	½	½	½	½	1	½	1	1	8½	2742	1
2	Jeroen Piket (Netherlands)	2640	1		½	½	0	½	½	½	½	1	1	½	1	½	8	2721	2–4
3	Alexander Onischuk (Ukraine)	2580	½	½		½	1	½	½	0	1	1	1	0	½	1	8	2726	2–4
4	Ivan Sokolov (Bosnia and Herzegovina)	2615	0	½	½		½	1	1	1	½	½	½	1	½	½	8	2723	2–4
5	Alex Yermolinsky (United States)	2630	0	1	0	½		1	½	½	½	½	½	1	½	½	7	2664	5
6	Julio Granda Zúñiga (Peru)	2620	½	½	½	0	0		0	1	1	1	1	0	1	0	6½	2636	6–7
7	Jan Timman (Netherlands)	2630	½	½	½	0	½	1		½	½	½	0	1	0	1	6½	2635	6–7
8	Viktor Korchnoi (Switzerland)	2635	½	½	1	0	½	0	½		½	1	½	½	0	½	6	2606	8–11
9	Joël Lautier (France)	2630	½	½	0	½	½	0	½	½		½	0	½	1	1	6	2606	8–11
10	Nigel Short (England)	2690	½	0	0	½	½	0	½	0	½		1	½	1	1	6	2601	8–11
11	Loek van Wely (Netherlands)	2645	0	0	0	½	½	0	1	½	1	0		1	½	1	6	2605	8–11
12	Miguel Illescas (Spain)	2635	½	½	1	0	0	1	0	½	½	½	0		½	½	5½	2578	12
13	Predrag Nikolić (Bosnia and Herzegovina)	2655	0	0	½	½	½	0	1	1	0	0	½	½		½	5	2546	13
14	Igor Glek (Russia)	2620	0	½	0	½	½	1	0	½	0	0	0	½	½		4	2495	14

59th Hoogovens tournament, group B, 21 January – 2 February 1997, Wijk aan Zee, Cat. X (2482)
	Player	Rating	1	2	3	4	5	6	7	8	9	10	11	12	Total	TPR	Place
1	GM Friso Nijboer (Netherlands)	2555		0	½	1	½	½	1	1	1	½	½	1	7½	2608	1–2
2	GM Paul van der Sterren (Netherlands)	2515	1		0	½	1	0	½	1	½	1	1	1	7½	2612	1–2
3	GM Roberto Cifuentes (Netherlands)	2515	½	1		½	0	½	½	½	1	1	½	½	6½	2544	3–4
4	IM Étienne Bacrot (France)	2500	0	½	½		1	½	1	0	½	½	1	1	6½	2545	3–4
5	GM Suat Atalık (Turkey)	2555	½	0	1	0		½	½	1	½	1	1	0	6	2511	5
6	GM Đào Thiên Hải (Vietnam)	2555	½	1	½	½	½		0	½	½	½	1	0	5½	2475	6–8
7	GM John van der Wiel (Netherlands)	2555	0	½	½	0	½	1		½	½	½	½	1	5½	2475	6–8
8	IM Alberto David (Luxembourg)	2455	0	0	½	1	0	½	½		1	½	½	1	5½	2484	6–8
9	IM Alexander Kalinin (Russia)	2425	0	½	0	½	½	½	½	0		1	½	1	5	2451	9
10	IM Liafbern Riemersma (Netherlands)	2435	½	0	0	½	0	½	½	½	0		½	1	4	2384	10
11	IM Peng Zhaoqin (Netherlands)	2370	½	0	½	0	0	0	½	½	½	½		1	4	2390	11
12	Ruud Janssen (Netherlands)	2350	0	0	½	0	1	1	0	0	0	0	0		2½	2283	12
