= Corus Chess Tournament 2000 =

Chess tournament

- Venue: Wijk aan Zee

The Corus Chess Tournament 2000 was the 62nd edition of the Corus Chess Tournament. It was held in Wijk aan Zee in January 2000 and was won for the second consecutive year by Garry Kasparov.

62nd Corus Chess Tournament, group A, 15–30 January 2000, Wijk aan Zee, Cat. XVIII (2697)
	Player	Rating	1	2	3	4	5	6	7	8	9	10	11	12	13	14	Total	TPR	Place
1	Garry Kasparov (Russia)	2851		½	½	½	1	½	½	1	1	½	1	1	½	1	9½	2860	1
2	Vladimir Kramnik (Russia)	2758	½		½	½	½	1	½	½	½	1	½	½	1	½	8	2779	2–4
3	Peter Leko (Hungary)	2725	½	½		½	½	½	½	½	1	½	½	1	1	½	8	2782	2–4
4	Viswanathan Anand (India)	2769	½	½	½		½	½	½	½	1	½	½	1	1	½	8	2778	2–4
5	Alexander Morozevich (Russia)	2748	0	½	½	½		½	½	0	1	½	1	½	1	1	7½	2750	5
6	Michael Adams (England)	2715	½	0	½	½	½		½	1	0	1	½	½	½	1	7	2725	6
7	Jeroen Piket (Netherlands)	2633	½	½	½	½	½	½		1	0	1	0	0	1	½	6½	2702	7–8
8	Jan Timman (Netherlands)	2655	0	½	½	½	1	0	0		½	½	½	½	1	1	6½	2700	7–8
9	Predrag Nikolić (Bosnia and Herzegovina)	2659	0	½	0	0	0	1	1	½		½	½	1	½	½	6	2671	9
10	Nigel Short (England)	2683	½	0	½	½	½	0	0	½	½		1	½	½	½	5½	2641	10
11	Judit Polgár (Hungary)	2658	0	½	½	½	0	½	1	½	½	0		½	0	½	5	2613	11–12
12	Viktor Korchnoi (Switzerland)	2659	0	½	0	0	½	½	1	½	0	½	½		0	1	5	2613	11–12
13	Smbat Lputian (Armenia)	2605	½	0	0	0	0	½	0	0	½	½	1	1		½	4½	2594	13
14	Loek van Wely (Netherlands)	2646	0	½	½	½	0	0	½	0	½	½	½	0	½		4	2560	14

62nd Corus Chess Tournament, group B, 18–30 January 2000, Wijk aan Zee, Cat. XI (2507)
	Player	Rating	1	2	3	4	5	6	7	8	9	10	11	12	Total	TPR	Place
1	GM Sergei Tiviakov (Netherlands)	2567		½	1	½	1	1	½	½	1	0	1	1	8	2676	1–3
2	GM Alexander Onischuk (Ukraine)	2637	½		½	½	1	½	1	½	½	1	1	1	8	2669	1–3
3	GM Boris Avrukh (Israel)	2620	0	½		1	½	1	½	1	½	1	1	1	8	2671	1–3
4	GM Liviu-Dieter Nisipeanu (Romania)	2611	½	½	0		½	0	½	1	1	½	1	1	6½	2562	4–5
5	GM John van der Wiel (Netherlands)	2558	0	0	½	½		0	1	½	1	1	1	1	6½	2566	4–5
6	GM Dimitri Reinderman (Netherlands)	2561	0	½	0	1	1		0	1	½	1	½	½	6	2537	6
7	GM Friso Nijboer (Netherlands)	2540	½	0	½	½	0	1		0	1	1	0	1	5½	2503	7–8
8	IM Silvio Danailov (Bulgaria)	2462	½	½	0	0	½	0	1		1	1	½	½	5½	2510	7–8
9	GM Maurice Ashley (United States)	2499	0	½	½	0	0	½	0	0		½	1	½	3½	2374	9–10
10	Joost Berkvens (Netherlands)	2297	1	0	0	½	0	0	0	0	½		½	1	3½	2392	9–10
11	Willy Hendriks (Netherlands)	2373	0	0	0	0	0	½	1	½	0	½		½	3	2343	11
12	IM Jop Delemarre (Netherlands)	2354	0	0	0	0	0	½	0	½	½	0	½		2	2258	12

(Netherlands) IM Manuel Bosboom (2461) won Reserve Group Swiss-system tournament with the score 7/9 and performance rating 2595.
