= Hoogovens Wijk aan Zee Chess Tournament 1993 =

Chess tournament

- Venue: Wijk aan Zee

The Hoogovens Wijk aan Zee Steel Chess Tournament 1993 was the 55th edition of the Hoogovens Wijk aan Zee Chess Tournament. It was held in Wijk aan Zee in January 1993 and was won by Anatoly Karpov.

The 1993 tournament moved away from its traditional round-robin format, instead being contested as a series of knockout matches. Anatoly Karpov defeated Miguel Illescas in the final 2½ to 1½.

Preliminary round
Larry Christiansen (USA)	1½
Viktor Korchnoi (SWI)	½
Zurab Azmaiparashvili (GEO)	2
John van der Wiel (NED)	0
Vladimir Akopian (ARM)	1½
Friso Nijboer (NED)	½
Eric Lobron (GER)	2½
Paul van der Sterren (NED)	1½
Lembit Oll (EST)	1½
Patrick Wolff (USA)	½
Predrag Nikolić (BIH)	1½
Loek van Wely (NED)	½
Michael Adams (ENG)	½
Julian Hodgson (ENG)	1½
Miguel Illescas (ESP)	2½
Vladimir Tukmakov (UKR)	1½

Round of 16
Larry Christiansen (USA)	2½
Anatoly Karpov (RUS)	3½
John Nunn (ENG)	1½
Zurab Azmaiparashvili (GEO)	½
Vladimir Akopian (ARM)	½
Valery Salov (RUS)	1½
Curt Hansen (DEN)	½
Eric Lobron (GER)	1½
Lembit Oll (EST)	2½
Ivan Sokolov (BIH)	1½
Alexei Shirov (LAT)	1½
Predrag Nikolić (BIH)	½
Julian Hodgson (ENG)	1½
Jeroen Piket (NED)	½
Boris Gelfand (BLR)	1½
Miguel Illescas (ESP)	2½

Quarterfinals
Anatoly Karpov (RUS)	1½
John Nunn (ENG)	½
Valery Salov (RUS)	2
Eric Lobron (GER)	0
Lembit Oll (EST)	2½
Alexei Shirov (LAT)	1½
Julian Hodgson (ENG)	0
Miguel Illescas (ESP)	2

Semifinals
Anatoly Karpov (RUS)	1½
Valery Salov (RUS)	½
Lembit Oll (EST)	0
Miguel Illescas (ESP)	2

Final
Anatoly Karpov (RUS)	2½
Miguel Illescas (ESP)	1½
