= Nicolaas Cortlever =

Dutch chess player (1915–1995)

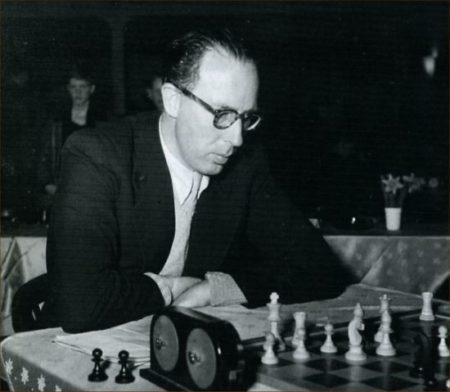
Nico Cortlever (1939)

Nicolaas (Nico) Cortlever (14 June 1915, in Amsterdam – 5 April 1995) was a Dutch chess master.

He tied for 7-8th at Rotterdam 1936 (10th NED-ch, Salo Landau won); took 2nd at Amsterdam 1938 (11th NED-ch, Max Euwe won); won at the 2nd Hoogovens Beverwijk 1939 (Quadrangular); tied for 4-6th at Amsterdam I and 3rd-4th at Amsterdam II in 1939.

During World War II, he tied for 2nd-3rd at Beverwijk 1940 (Quadrangular, Euwe won); shared 1st with Landau and Lodewijk Prins at Leeuwarden 1940; took 2nd, behind Arthur Wijnans at Beverwijk 1941 (Quadrangular); tied for 14-15th at Munich 1941 (the 2nd Europaturnier, Gösta Stoltz won).

After the war, he took 4th at Beverwijk 1946 (Alberic O'Kelly de Galway won); tied for 2nd-3rd at Zaandam 1946 (László Szabó won); took 2nd at Beverwijk 1947 (Theo van Scheltinga won); tied for 8-9th at Beverwijk 1948 (Prins won); took 4th at Beverwijk 1950 (Jan Hein Donner won).

He took 4th at Amsterdam 1950 (15th NED-ch, Euwe won); tied for 7-9th at Enschede 1952 (16th NED-ch, Euwe won); tied for 9-10th at Beverwijk 1953 (Nicolas Rossolimo won); tied for 2nd-3rd at Amsterdam 1954 (17th NED-ch, Donner won); took 2nd, behind Donner, at Amsterdam 1958 (19th NED-ch).

Cortlever represented The Netherlands in Chess Olympiads:

- In 1936, at eighth board in 3rd unofficial Chess Olympiad in Munich (+4 –5 =9);
- In 1939, at second board in 8th Chess Olympiad in Buenos Aires (+3 –2 =11);
- In 1950, at fourth board in 9th Chess Olympiad in Dubrovnik (+6 –0 =5);
- In 1952, at fourth board in 10th Chess Olympiad in Helsinki (+6 –3 =4);
- In 1954, at third board in 11th Chess Olympiad in Amsterdam (+1 –3 =4).

He won individual silver medal at Dubrovnik 1950.

Cortlever was awarded the International Master (IM) title in 1950.
