= Hoogovens Wijk aan Zee Chess Tournament 1989 =

Chess tournament

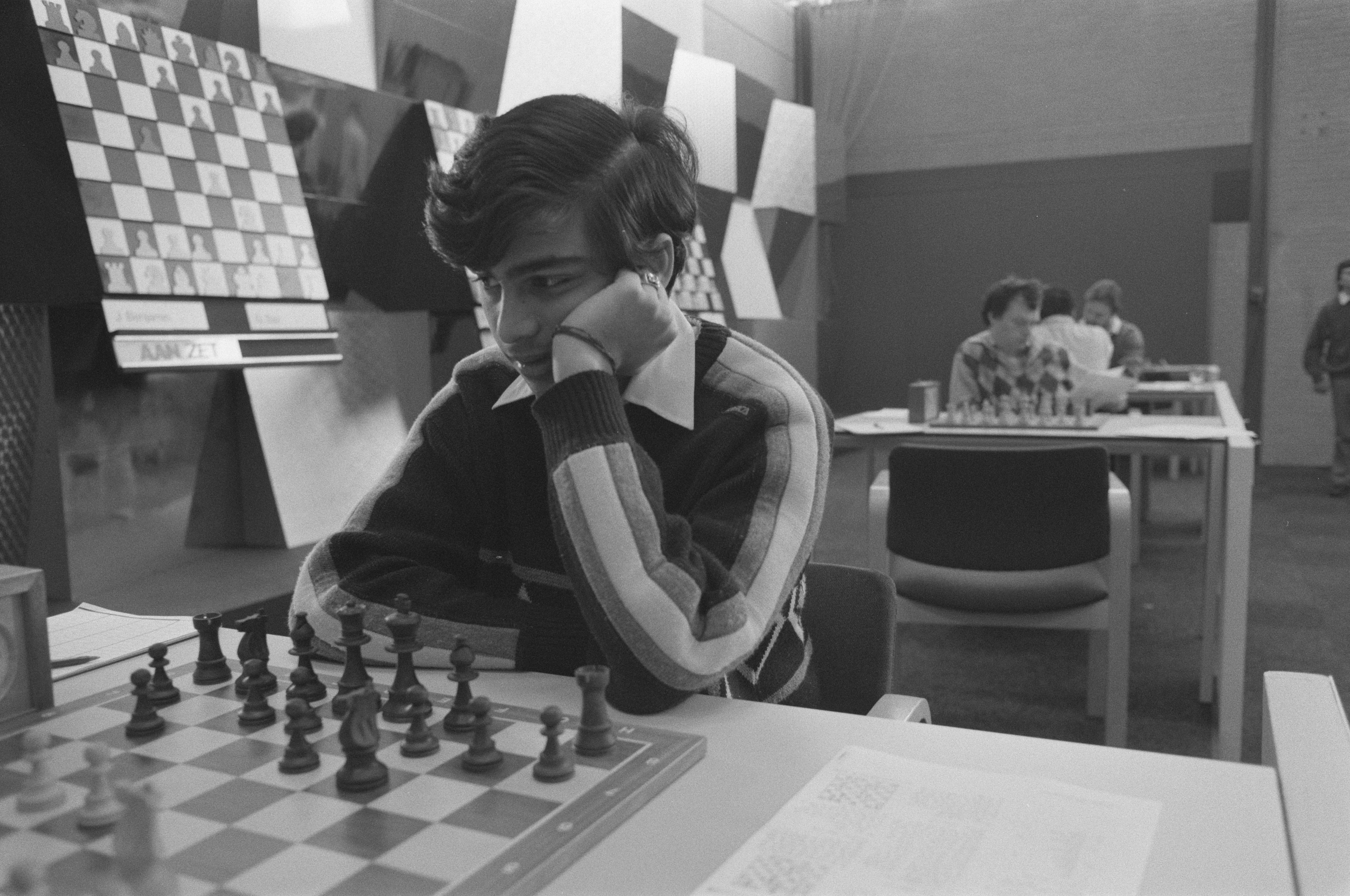
- Joint winner Viswanathan Anand
- Venue: Wijk aan Zee

The Hoogovens Wijk aan Zee Steel Chess Tournament 1989 was the 51st edition of the Wijk aan Zee Chess Tournament. It was held in Wijk aan Zee in January 1989 and was jointly won by four players: Viswanathan Anand, Predrag Nikolić, Zoltán Ribli and Gyula Sax.

51st Hoogovens tournament, group A, January 1989, Wijk aan Zee, Netherlands, Category XIII (2551)
	Player	Rating	1	2	3	4	5	6	7	8	9	10	11	12	13	14	Total	TPR	Place
1	Viswanathan Anand (India)	2515		½	½	½	1	½	0	1	1	0	½	1	½	½	7½	2611	1–4
2	Predrag Nikolić (Yugoslavia)	2605	½		½	½	½	1	½	½	1	0	½	0	1	1	7½	2604	1–4
3	Zoltán Ribli (Hungary)	2625	½	½		½	0	1	½	½	½	1	½	½	½	1	7½	2602	1–4
4	Gyula Sax (Hungary)	2610	½	½	½		½	0	1	0	½	1	1	½	1	½	7½	2604	1–4
5	Kiril Georgiev (Bulgaria)	2590	0	½	1	½		½	½	½	0	1	½	1	½	½	7	2577	5–6
6	Jeroen Piket (Netherlands)	2500	½	0	0	1	½		½	1	0	1	½	½	½	1	7	2584	5–6
7	John van der Wiel (Netherlands)	2560	1	½	½	0	½	½		½	½	½	1	½	0	½	6½	2550	7–8
8	Anthony Miles (England)	2520	0	½	½	1	½	0	½		0	0	1	1	1	½	6½	2553	7–8
9	Joel Benjamin (United States)	2545	0	0	½	½	1	1	½	1		½	0	½	½	0	6	2523	9–11
10	Vitaly Tseshkovsky (Soviet Union)	2520	1	1	0	0	0	0	½	1	½		½	1	0	½	6	2524	9–11
11	Rafael Vaganian (Soviet Union)	2600	½	½	½	0	½	½	0	0	1	½		½	½	1	6	2518	9–11
12	Ivan Sokolov (Yugoslavia)	2580	0	1	½	½	0	½	½	0	½	0	½		1	½	5½	2492	12–13
13	Julio Granda Zúñiga (Peru)	2500	½	0	½	0	½	½	1	0	½	1	½	0		½	5½	2498	12–13
14	Rudy Douven (Netherlands)	2445	½	0	0	½	½	0	½	½	1	½	0	½	½		5	2472	14
