= Hoogovens Wijk aan Zee Chess Tournament 1985 =

Chess tournament

Hoogovens Wijk aan Zee Chess Tournament 1984
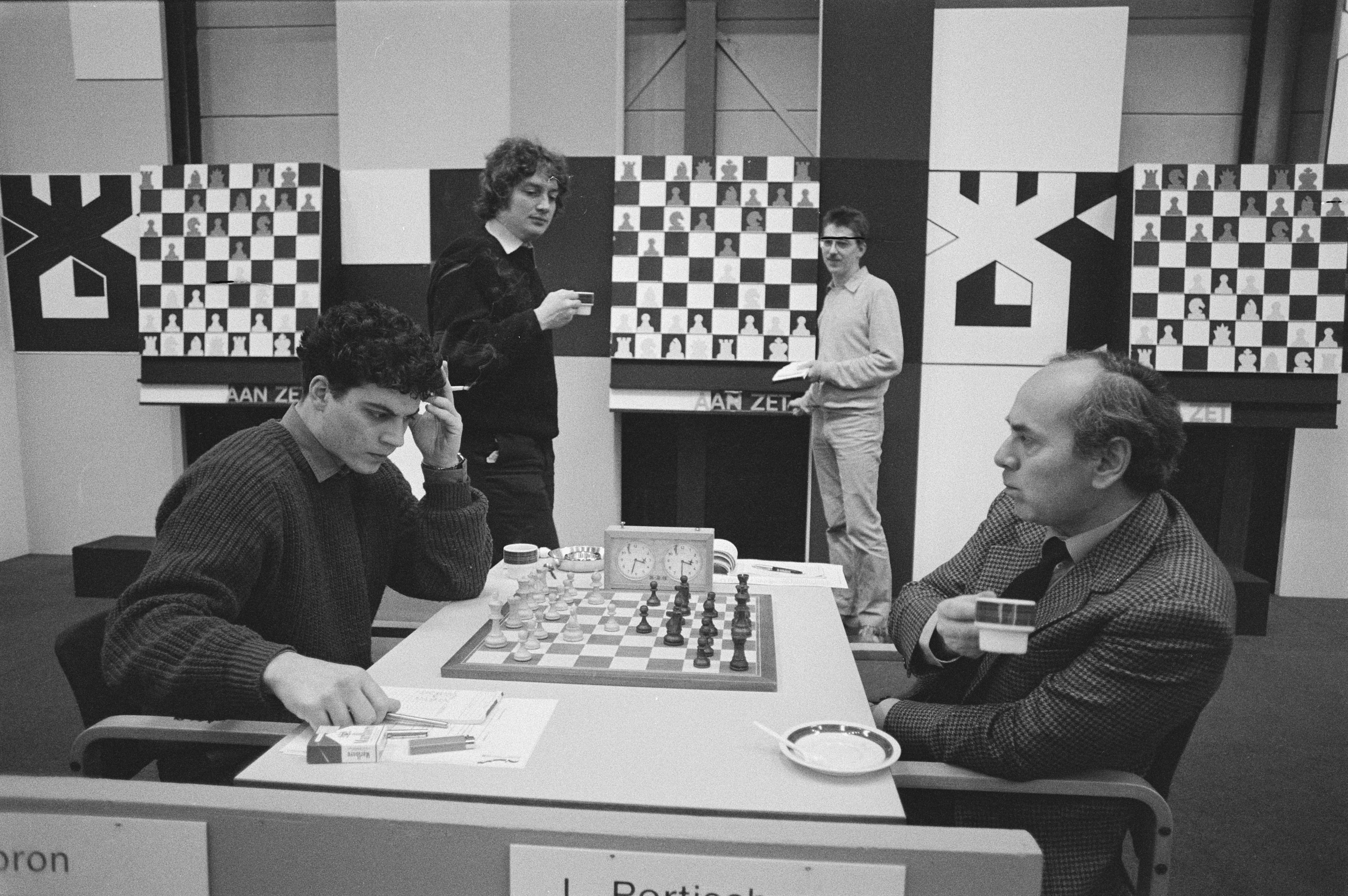
- Lobron playing Portisch, with Timman watching
- Venue: Wijk aan Zee

The Hoogovens Wijk aan Zee Steel Chess Tournament 1985 was the 47th edition of the Wijk aan Zee Chess Tournament. It was held in Wijk aan Zee in January 1985. The tournament was won by Jan Timman.

47th Hoogovens tournament, group A, 13 January – 3 February 1985, Wijk aan Zee, Netherlands, Category XIII (2555)
	Player	Rating	1	2	3	4	5	6	7	8	9	10	11	12	13	14	Total	TPR	Place
1	Jan Timman (Netherlands)	2650		½	1	½	½	1	1	½	½	½	½	1	½	1	9	2689	1
2	John Nunn (England)	2615	½		1	½	½	0	1	½	1	½	½	½	½	1	8	2637	2–3
3	Alexander Beliavsky (Soviet Union)	2635	0	0		½	½	1	½	1	½	1	½	½	1	1	8	2636	2–3
4	Kiril Georgiev (Bulgaria)	2535	½	½	½		½	½	1	½	1	0	½	½	1	½	7½	2614	4
5	Lajos Portisch (Hungary)	2635	½	½	½	½		½	0	½	1	0	1	½	1	½	7	2578	5
6	Oleg Romanishin (Soviet Union)	2570	0	1	0	½	½		½	½	½	½	1	½	½	½	6½	2554	6–9
7	Eric Lobron (West Germany)	2505	0	0	½	0	1	½		1	1	1	½	0	½	½	6½	2559	6–9
8	Hans Ree (Netherlands)	2455	½	½	0	½	½	½	0		0	1	½	1	½	1	6½	2563	6–9
9	Viktor Korchnoi (Switzerland)	2630	½	0	½	0	0	½	0	1		½	1	1	1	½	6½	2549	6–9
10	Kevin Spraggett (Canada)	2560	½	½	0	1	1	½	0	0	½		½	½	½	0	5½	2498	10–11
11	Ľubomír Ftáčnik (Czechoslovakia)	2545	½	½	½	½	0	0	½	½	0	½		½	½	1	5½	2499	10–11
12	John van der Wiel (Netherlands)	2500	0	½	½	½	½	½	1	0	0	½	½		½	0	5	2472	12–13
13	Gert Ligterink (Netherlands)	2450	½	½	0	0	0	½	½	½	0	½	½	½		1	5	2476	12–13
14	Sergey Kudrin (United States)	2485	0	0	0	½	½	½	½	0	½	1	0	1	0		4½	2450	14
