= Hoogovens Wijk aan Zee Chess Tournament 1986 =

Chess tournament

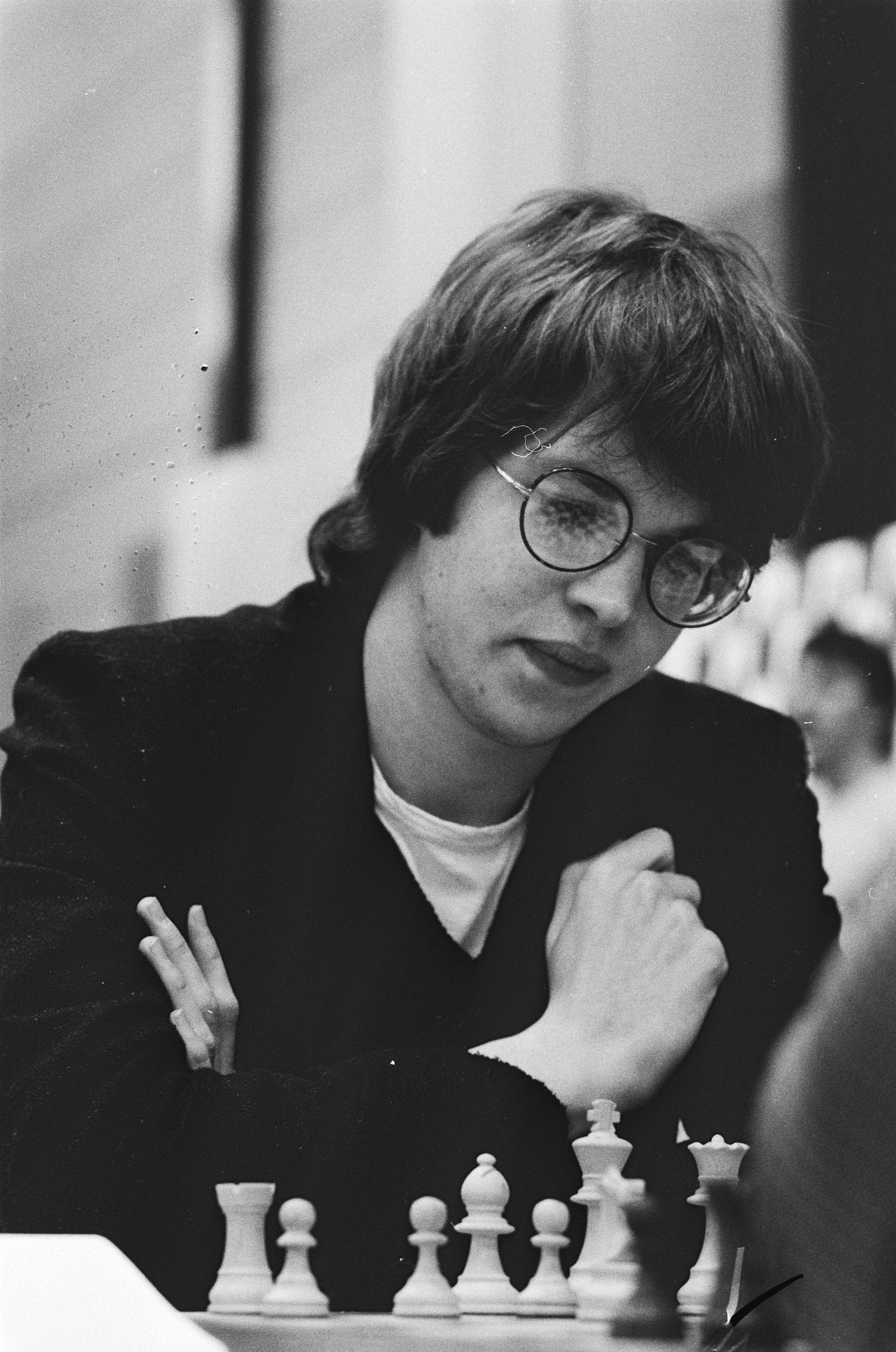
- Nigel Short at Hoogovens 1986
- Venue: Wijk aan Zee

The Hoogovens Wijk aan Zee Steel Chess Tournament 1986 was the 48th edition of the Wijk aan Zee Chess Tournament. It was held in Wijk aan Zee in January 1986. The tournament was won by Nigel Short.

48th Hoogovens tournament, group A, 17 January – 2 February 1986, Wijk aan Zee, Netherlands, Category XII (2539)
	Player	Rating	1	2	3	4	5	6	7	8	9	10	11	12	13	14	Total	TPR	Place
1	Nigel Short (England)	2585		½	½	½	1	½	1	½	½	½	1	1	1	1	9½	2710	1
2	John van der Wiel (Netherlands)	2555	½		0	1	½	½	1	½	½	½	½	1	1	½	8	2624	2–4
3	Ljubomir Ljubojević (Yugoslavia)	2605	½	1		½	½	½	½	½	0	½	1	1	½	1	8	2620	2–4
4	Predrag Nikolić (Yugoslavia)	2565	½	0	½		½	1	0	½	1	½	½	1	1	1	8	2624	2–4
5	Robert Hübner (West Germany)	2625	0	½	½	½		½	½	½	½	½	1	1	½	1	7½	2589	5
6	Julian Hodgson (England)	2480	½	½	½	0	½		0	½	1	1	½	0	1	1	7	2572	6–7
7	Gennadi Sosonko (Netherlands)	2525	0	0	½	1	½	1		½	½	½	½	½	½	1	7	2569	6–7
8	Alexander Chernin (Soviet Union)	2570	½	½	½	½	½	½	½		½	½	½	1	½	0	6½	2536	8–10
9	Yasser Seirawan (United States)	2605	½	½	1	0	½	0	½	½		½	½	½	1	½	6½	2533	8–10
10	Vlastimil Hort (West Germany)	2545	½	½	½	½	½	0	½	½	½		1	½	½	½	6½	2538	8–10
11	Ferdinand Hellers (Sweden)	2435	0	½	0	½	0	½	½	½	½	0		0	½	1	4½	2437	11–13
12	Paul van der Sterren (Netherlands)	2470	0	0	0	0	0	1	½	0	½	½	1		½	½	4½	2434	11–13
13	Hans Ree (Netherlands)	2455	0	0	½	0	½	0	½	½	0	½	½	½		1	4½	2435	11–13
14	Nicholas de Firmian (United States)	2520	0	½	0	0	0	0	0	1	½	½	0	½	0		3	2329	14
