= Arnold van den Hoek =

Dutch chess player

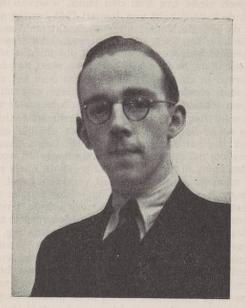
A. J. van den Hoek

Arnold (Arnoldus) Johannes van den Hoek (1 December 1921, Amsterdam – 14 January 1945, Watenstedt, suburb of Braunschweig) was a Dutch chess master.

In August 1942, v.d. Hoek, Adriaan de Groot and Nicolaas Cortlever tied for first place in the qualifier of Dutch Chess Championship in Leeuwarden. He won the playoff, and next lost a match for the title to Max Euwe (2 : 8) at The Hague 1942. In January 1943, he won the Beverwijk Hoogovenstoernooi. Later that year he was deported to do forced labour in a German defence plant. He was killed there in an allied bombardment on 14 January 1945.
