= Hoogovens Wijk aan Zee Chess Tournament 1990 =

Chess tournament

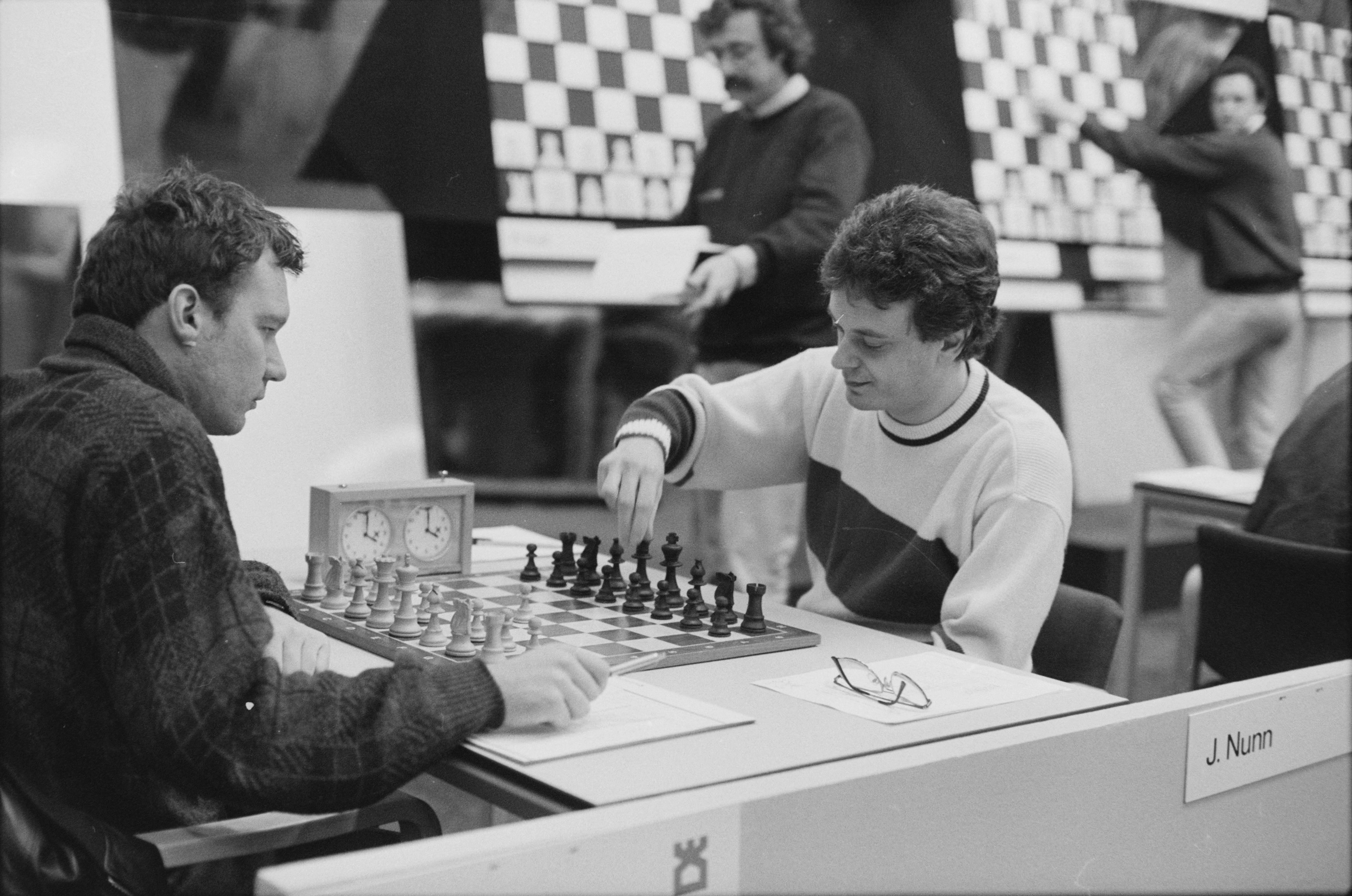
- Rini Kuijf vs. John Nunn
- Venue: Wijk aan Zee

The Hoogovens Wijk aan Zee Steel Chess Tournament 1990 was the 52nd edition of the Wijk aan Zee Chess Tournament. It was held in Wijk aan Zee in January 1990 and was won by John Nunn.

52nd Hoogovens tournament, group A, 12–28 January 1990, Wijk aan Zee, Netherlands, Category XIII (2567)
	Player	Rating	1	2	3	4	5	6	7	8	9	10	11	12	13	14	Total	TPR	Place
1	John Nunn (England)	2600		½	½	½	½	1	0	1	0	1	½	1	1	½	8	2651	1
2	Lajos Portisch (Hungary)	2605	½		½	½	½	1	½	½	1	1	½	½	0	½	7½	2621	2–3
3	Ulf Andersson (Sweden)	2630	½	½		½	½	½	½	0	½	½	1	½	1	1	7½	2619	2–3
4	Mikhail Gurevich (Soviet Union)	2645	½	½	½		½	½	½	0	1	½	1	½	½	½	7	2590	4–6
5	Margeir Pétursson (Iceland)	2555	½	½	½	½		½	½	½	½	½	½	½	½	1	7	2597	4–6
6	Maxim Dlugy (United States)	2525	0	0	½	½	½		½	1	½	½	½	1	½	1	7	2599	4–6
7	Yury Dokhoian (Soviet Union)	2540	1	½	½	½	½	½		½	½	½	½	0	0	1	6½	2569	7–10
8	Nigel Short (England)	2635	0	½	1	1	½	0	½		½	1	0	½	1	0	6½	2562	7–10
9	Viktor Korchnoi (Switzerland)	2625	1	0	½	0	½	½	½	½		½	½	1	1	0	6½	2562	7–10
10	Viswanathan Anand (India)	2555	0	0	½	½	½	½	½	0	½		1	½	1	1	6½	2568	7–10
11	John van der Wiel (Netherlands)	2550	½	½	0	0	½	½	½	1	½	0		½	½	1	6	2539	11–12
12	Jeroen Piket (Netherlands)	2495	0	½	½	½	½	0	1	½	0	½	½		½	1	6	2543	11–12
13	Marinus Kuijf (Netherlands)	2490	0	1	0	½	½	½	1	0	0	0	½	½		½	5	2486	13
14	Friso Nijboer (Netherlands)	2485	½	½	0	½	0	0	0	1	1	0	0	0	½		4	2432	14
