= Arthur Wijnans =

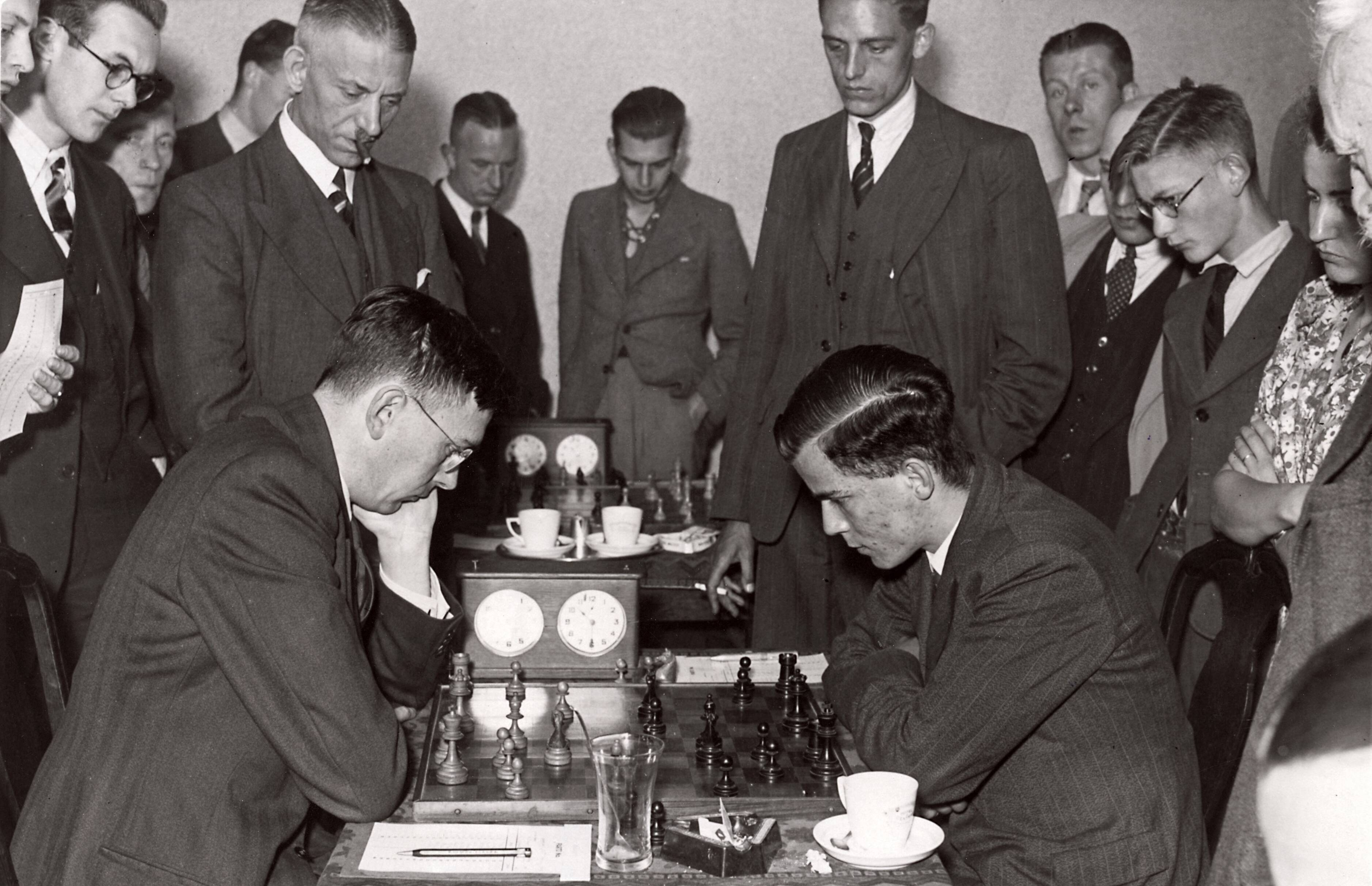
- Euwe (left) against Wijnans (1942)

Personal information
- Born: Arthur Joseph Wijnans; 21 July 1920 Padang, Indonesia
- Died: 3 May 1945 (aged 24) Neustadt in Holstein, Germany

Chess career
- Country: Netherlands

Arthur Joseph Wijnans (21 July 1920 – 3 May 1945) was an Indonesia-born Dutch chess player, study composer and member of the Dutch resistance against the Germans in World War II.

He took 3rd in Dutch Chess Championship in 1939, took 4th at Beverwijk 1940 (the 3rd Hoogovens, won by Max Euwe), won at Beverwijk 1941 (the 4th Hoogovens), and shared 2nd, after Arnold van den Hoek, at Beverwijk 1943 (the 6th Hoogovens). At the end of World War II, he and other winner at Beverwijk, van den Hoek, were transferred to Germany. Wijnans went to Neuengamme concentration camp. He was killed during the allied bombardment of the Cap Arcona on 3 May 1945.
