= Tata Steel Chess Tournament =

Annual chess tournament held in the Netherlands

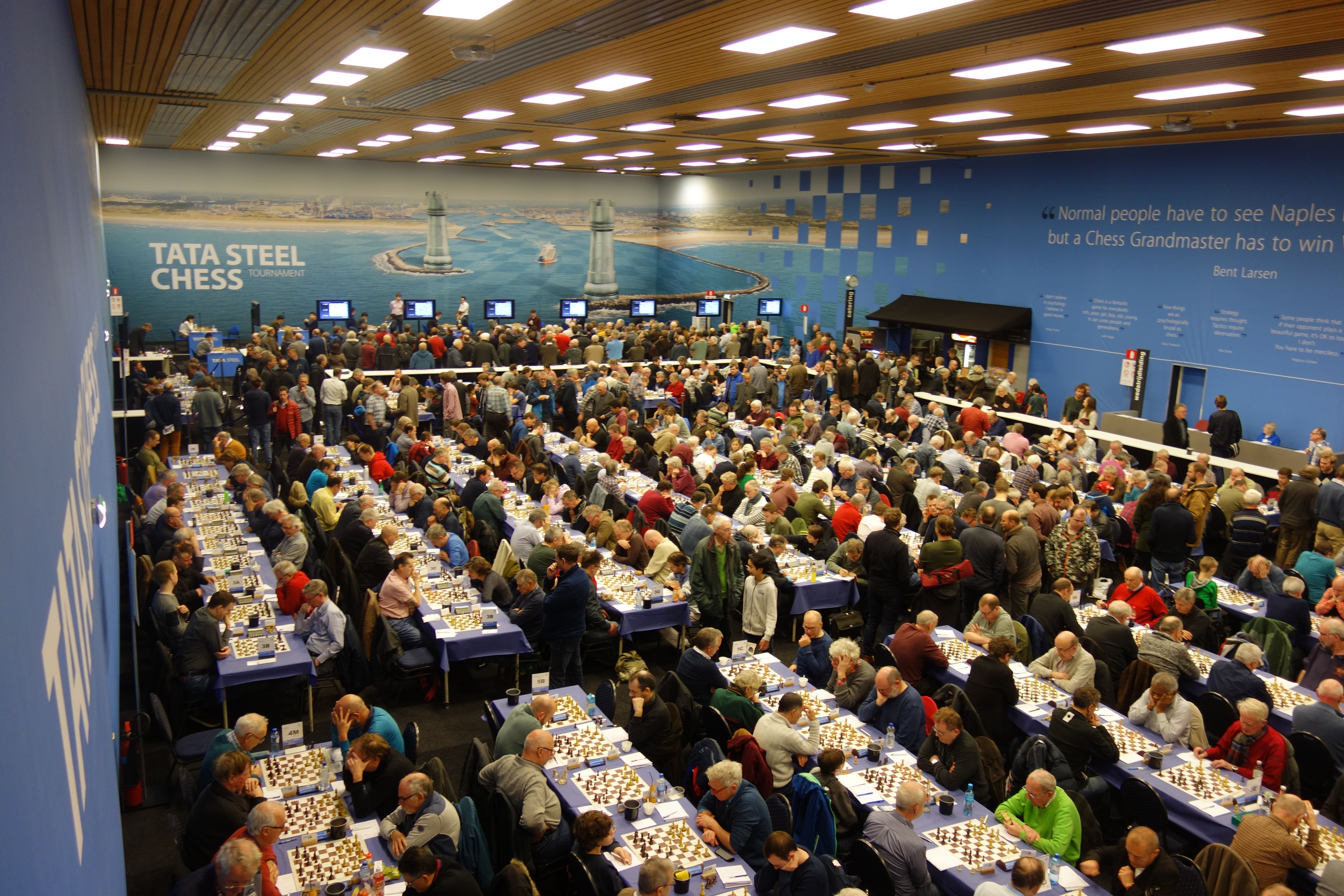
- Playing hall of the 80th Tata Steel Tournament, 2018

Tournament information
- Sport: Chess
- Location: Wijk aan Zee, Netherlands
- Established: 1938
- Format: Round-robin tournament
- Most championships: (Norway) Magnus Carlsen (8)

Current champion
- (Uzbekistan) Nodirbek Abdusattorov

The Tata Steel Chess Tournament is an annual chess tournament held in January in Wijk aan Zee, the Netherlands. It was called the Hoogovens Tournament from its creation in 1938 until the sponsor Koninklijke Hoogovens merged with British Steel to form the Corus Group in 1999, after which the tournament was renamed the Corus Chess Tournament. Corus Group was taken over by the Tata Group and became Tata Steel Europe in 2007, with the tournament changing to its current name in 2011. It has also been referred to as "Wijk aan Zee" since the venue change from the town of Beverwijk to the town of Wijk aan Zee in 1968. Despite the name changes, the series is numbered sequentially from its Hoogovens beginnings; for example, the 2025 event was referred to as the 87th Tata Steel Chess Tournament.

Top grandmasters compete in the tournament, but regular club players are welcome to play in the lower groups. The Masters group pits fourteen of the world's best players against each other in a round-robin tournament, and has sometimes been described as the "Wimbledon of Chess". Since 1938, there has been a long list of very strong winners; of the fifteen undisputed World Chess Champions since the first tournament in 1938, only five – Alexander Alekhine, Vasily Smyslov, Bobby Fischer, Ding Liren and Gukesh Dommaraju (Note: Gukesh tied for 1st in both 2024 & 2025 but lost the blitz tiebreaks to settle for 2nd)– have not won it. In 2001, nine of the top ten players in the world participated.

Magnus Carlsen holds the record for most wins at the tournament, with eight. Viswanathan Anand is the only other player to have won the event five or more times, with five titles to his name. Nodirbek Abdusattorov is the current champion after winning in 2026.

Until recently, players ending on the same score shared the title. The first tie-break was held in 2018, with Magnus Carlsen defeating Anish Giri to clinch the title. As of the 2025 edition, if two or more players lead with the same score at the end of the round-robin, they all take part in the tiebreaks to determine the sole winner. The time control of the tiebreaks is blitz, and then sudden death. (Note: The format and number of games is decided by the number of tied players.)

== Tournament history ==
=== Hoogovens Beverwijk ===
The early tournaments were very small, starting with groups of four in 1938, and entry restricted to Dutch players. The first four tournaments continued this way, until 1942, when it was expanded to six players, and in 1943 to eight players. No tournament was held in 1945 due to World War II. The first international tournament was held in 1946, with the field expanded to ten, and invitations to Alberic O'Kelly de Galway (Belgium) and Gösta Stoltz (Sweden) along with a Dutch contingent of eight.

The 1946 tournament was one of the first European international chess tournaments after World War II. Food shortages were still a problem in Europe, so the post-tournament banquet featured pea soup, "inexpensive fare of the common people". In subsequent years pea soup has been served as the first course of the concluding banquet, a tradition continued when the tournament was moved from Beverwijk to Wijk aan Zee.

Normal people have to see Naples before they die..., but a chess grandmaster has to win the Wijk aan Zee tournament first of all.

— Commonly attributed to Bent Larsen, winner of the 1960 and 1961 editions

The tournament field was increased to twelve in 1953, and an international women's tournament was also held. In 1954, the tournament field was returned to ten players, but the strength of the competitions increased. The field was greatly enlarged to 18 in 1963, and although it reduced to 16 in 1964, the event had become the strongest international chess tournament in the world.

As the tournament grew in stature, it began to offer lower groups such as a B-group (sometimes called "Challengers" in contrast to group-A or "Masters"), and occasionally a C-group. There also began a tradition to operate a year on year policy of inviting the winner of the B-group to the A-group.

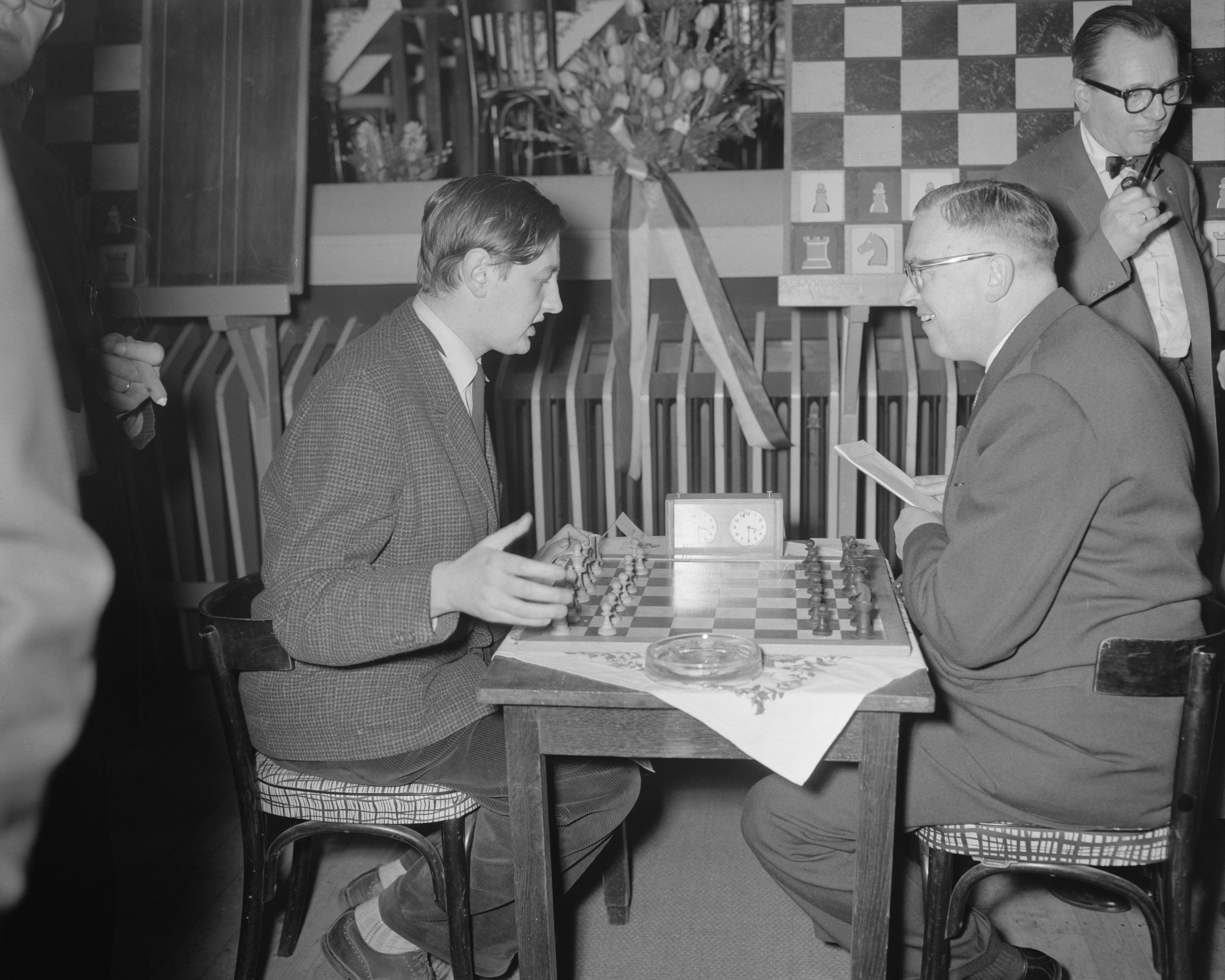
GM Jan Hein Donner, 3 time winner vs former World Chess Champion (WCC) Max Euwe, 4 time winner, pictured at Hoogovens 1958

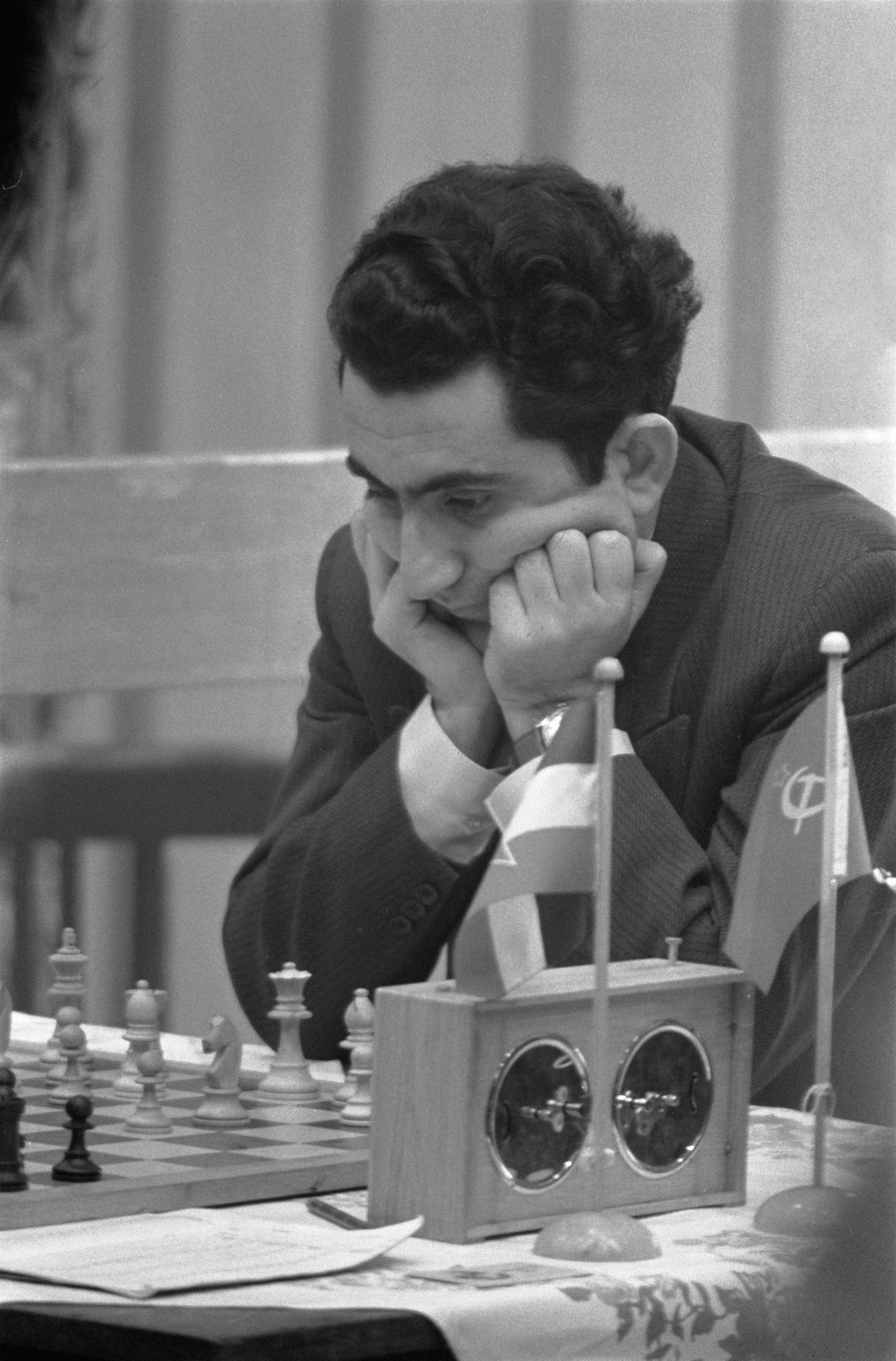
Future WCC Tigran Petrosian, pictured at Hoogovens 1960, which he went on to win

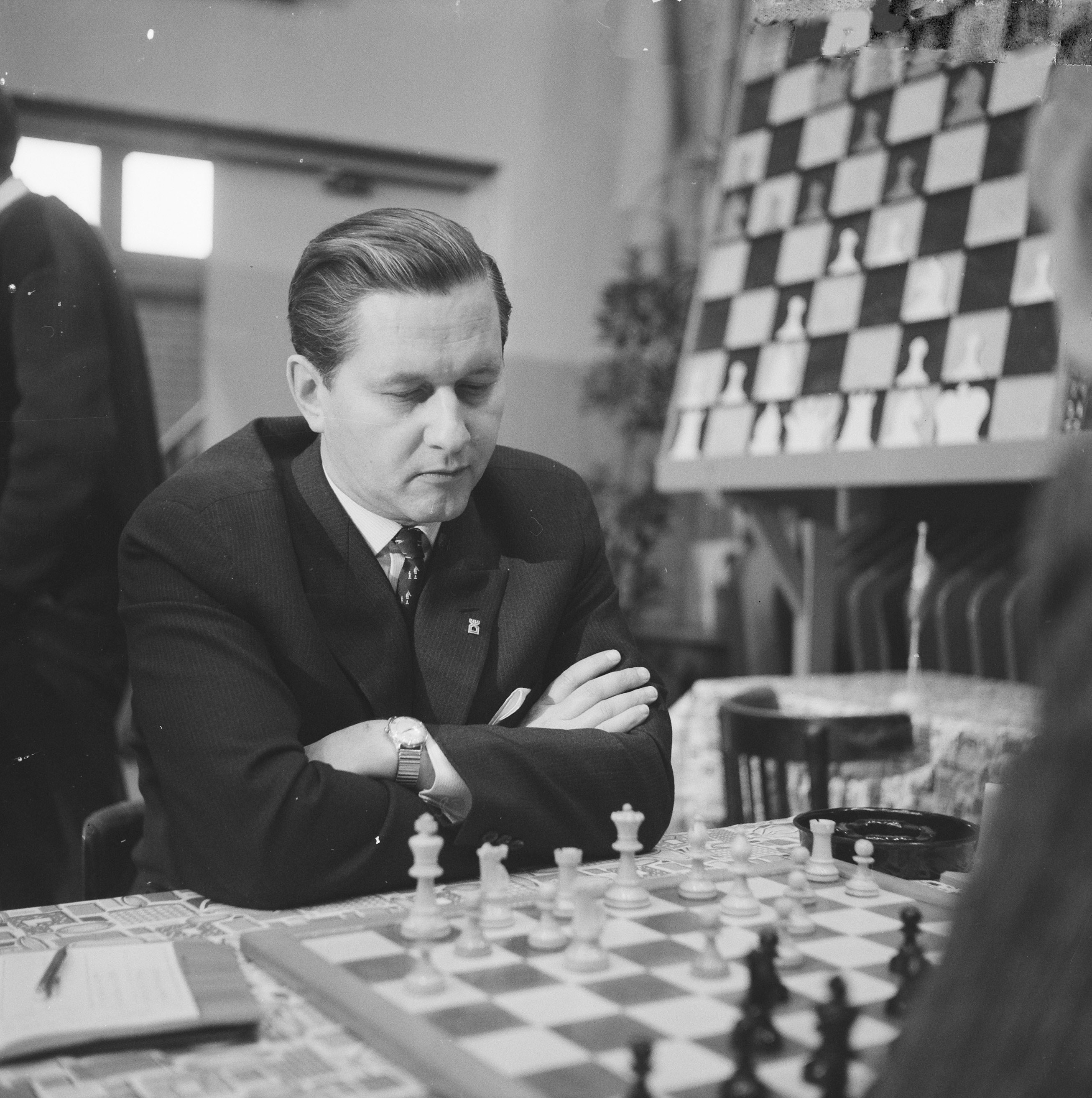
GM Paul Keres, pictured at Hoogovens 1964, which he went on to win

The winners of the top group were:

Winners 1938-1967
#	Year	Winner(s)	Country	Score	%
1	1938	Jilling Van Dijk	Netherlands	2½/3	83.3
1	1938	Philip Bakker	Netherlands	2½/3	83.3
2	1939	Nicolaas Cortlever	Netherlands	3/3	100.0
3	1940	Max Euwe	Netherlands	3/3	100.0
4	1941	Arthur Wijnans	Netherlands	2½/3	83.3
5	1942	Max Euwe	Netherlands	4½/5	90.0
6	1943	Arnold van den Hoek	Netherlands	5½/7	78.6
7	1944	Theo van Scheltinga	Netherlands	5/7	71.4
–	1945	No competition (Note: Due to World War II.)			
8	1946	Alberic O'Kelly de Galway	Belgium	7/9	77.8
9	1947	Theo van Scheltinga	Netherlands	7½/9	83.3
10	1948	Lodewijk Prins	Netherlands	6½/9	72.2
11	1949	Savielly Tartakower	France	6½/9	72.2
12	1950	Jan Hein Donner	Netherlands	7/9	77.8
13	1951	Hermann Pilnik	Argentina	6½/9	72.2
14	1952	Max Euwe	Netherlands	7½/9	83.3
15	1953	Nicolas Rossolimo	France	9/11	81.8
16	1954	Hans Bouwmeester	Netherlands	6/9	66.7
16	1954	Vasja Pirc	(Socialist Federal Republic of Yugoslavia) SFR Yugoslavia	6/9	66.7
17	1955	Borislav Milić	(Socialist Federal Republic of Yugoslavia) SFR Yugoslavia	6½/9	72.2
18	1956	Gideon Ståhlberg	Sweden	6½/9	72.2
19	1957	Aleksandar Matanović	(Socialist Federal Republic of Yugoslavia) SFR Yugoslavia	6½/9	72.2
20	1958	Max Euwe	Netherlands	5½/9	61.1
20	1958	Jan Hein Donner	Netherlands	5½/9	61.1
21	1959	Friðrik Ólafsson	Iceland	7½/9	83.3
22	1960	Bent Larsen	Denmark	6½/9	72.2
22	1960	Tigran Petrosian	Soviet Union	6½/9	72.2
23	1961	Bent Larsen	Denmark	7½/9	83.3
23	1961	Borislav Ivkov	(Socialist Federal Republic of Yugoslavia) SFR Yugoslavia	7½/9	83.3
24	1962	Petar Trifunović	(Socialist Federal Republic of Yugoslavia) SFR Yugoslavia	6/9	66.7
25	1963	Jan Hein Donner	Netherlands	12/17	70.6
26	1964	Paul Keres	Soviet Union	11½/15	76.6
26	1964	Iivo Nei	Soviet Union	11½/15	76.6
27	1965	Lajos Portisch	Hungary	10½/15	70.0
27	1965	Efim Geller	Soviet Union	10½/15	70.0
28	1966	Lev Polugaevsky	Soviet Union	11½/15	76.6
29	1967	Boris Spassky	Soviet Union	11/15	73.3

=== Hoogovens Wijk aan Zee ===
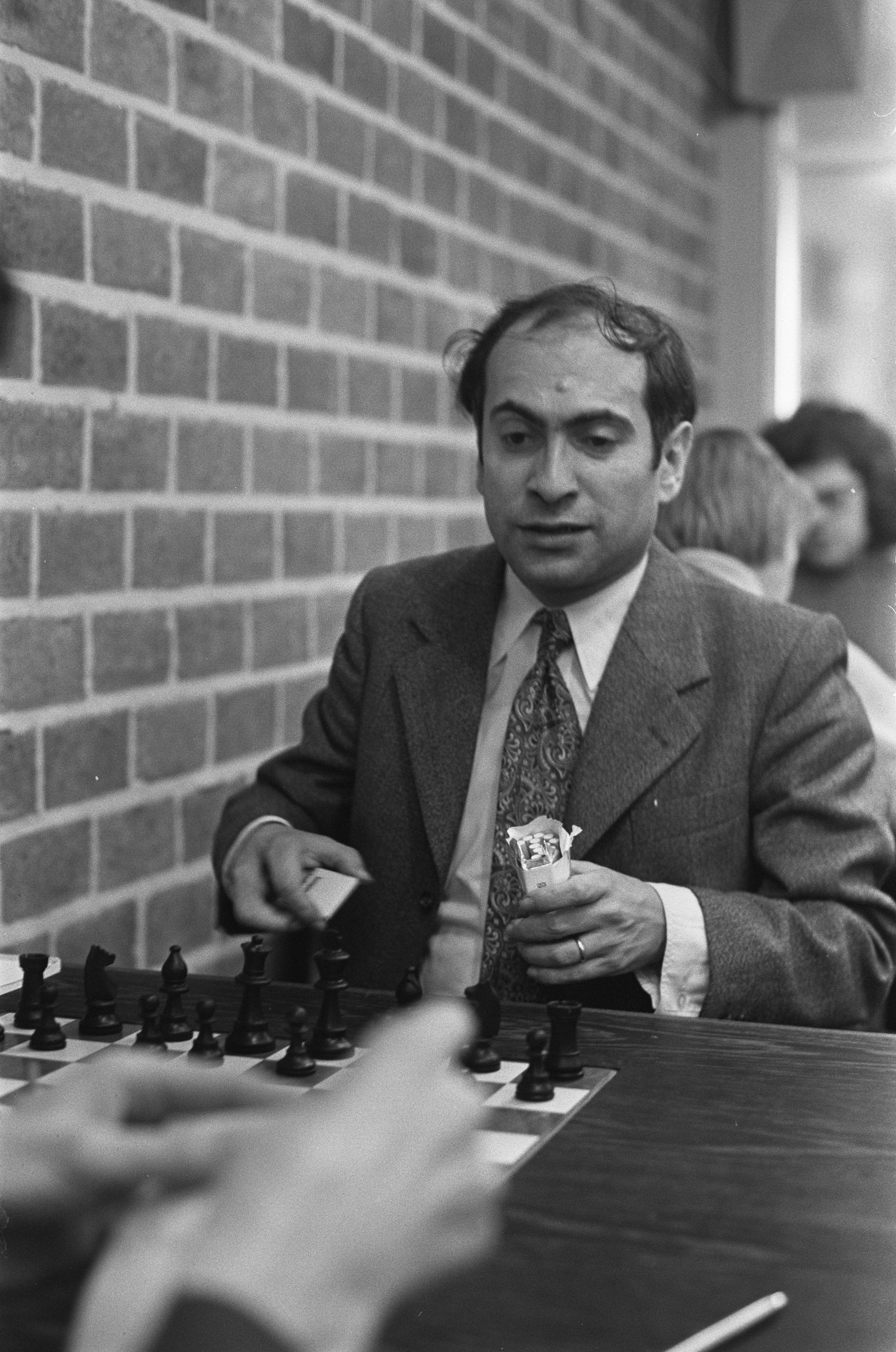
Former WCC Mikhail Tal, pictured at Hoogovens 1973, which he went on to win

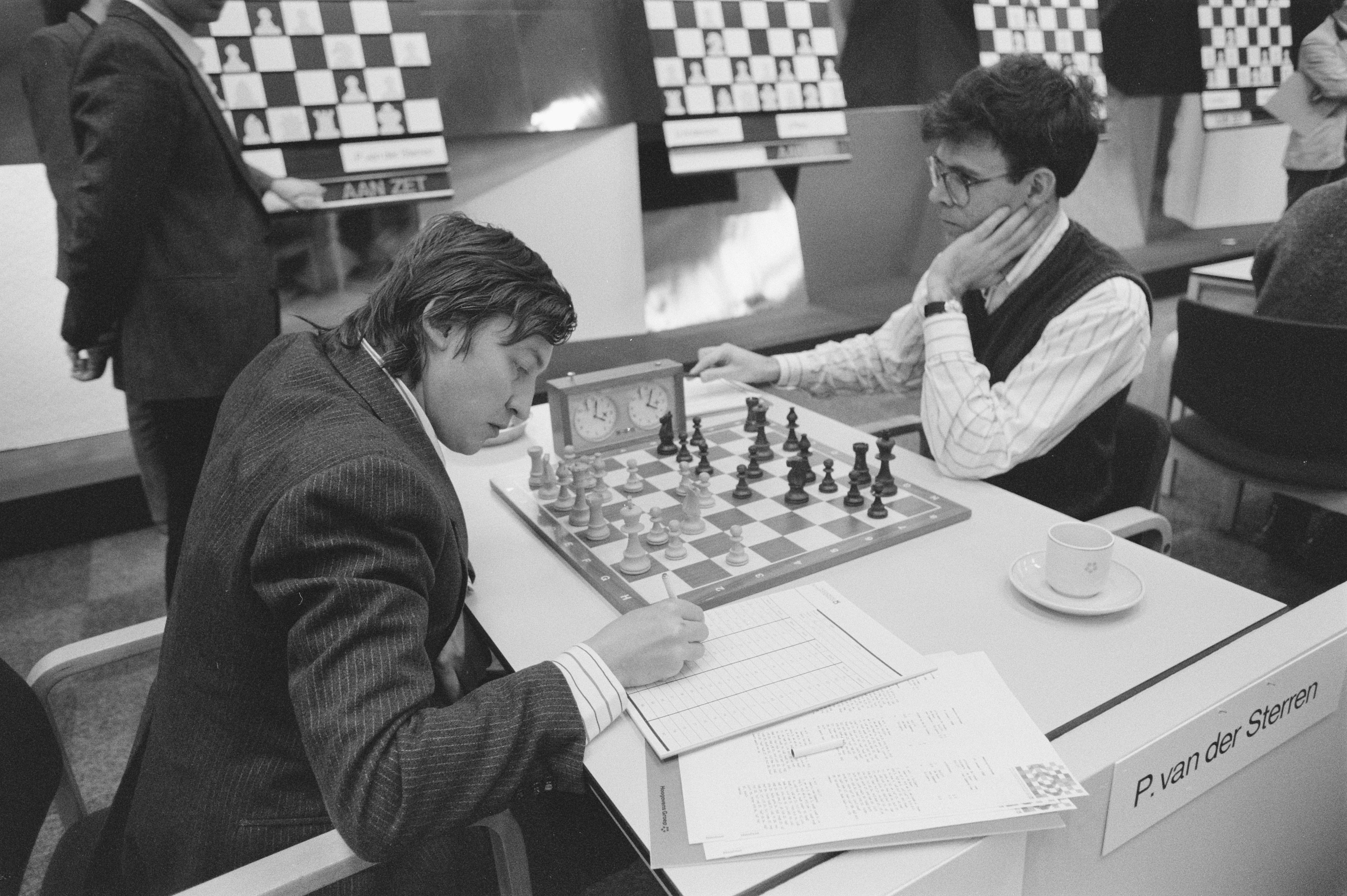
Former WCC Anatoly Karpov, a 2 time winner vs GM Paul van der Sterren, pictured at Hoogovens 1988; Karpov went on to win

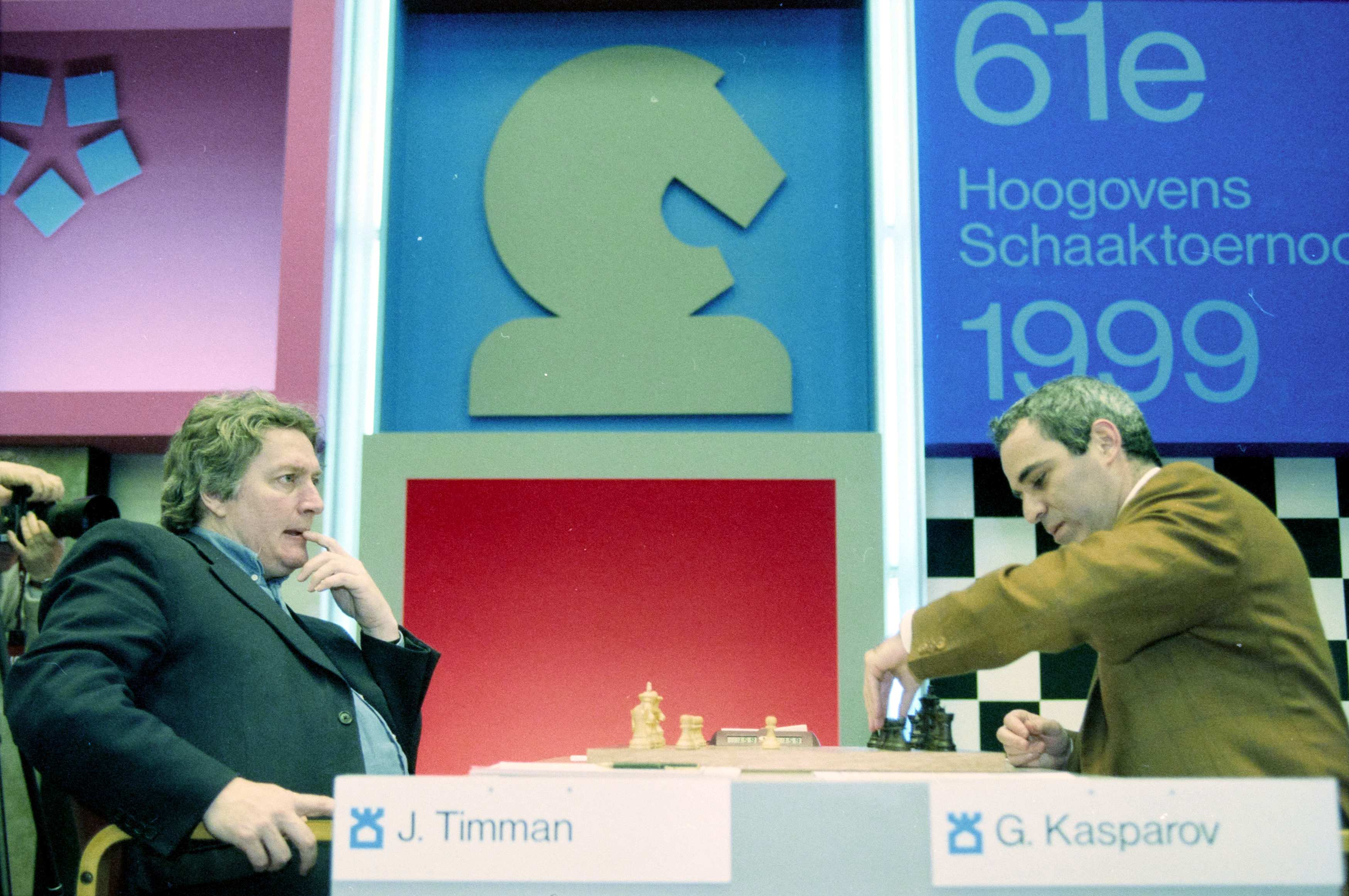
GM Jan Timman, a 2 time winner vs WCC Garry Kasparov, a 3 time winner, pictured at Hoogovens 1999; Kasparov went on to win

The tournament was moved to the Dutch seaside town Wijk aan Zee in 1968. Starting from 1982, the tournament mostly settled to its present number of 14 players. The winners of the top group were:

Winners 1968-1999
#	Year	Winner(s)	Country	Score	%
30	1968	Viktor Korchnoi	Soviet Union	12/15	80.0
31	1969	Mikhail Botvinnik	Soviet Union	10½/15	70.0
31	1969	Efim Geller	Soviet Union	10½/15	70.0
32	1970	Mark Taimanov	Soviet Union	12/15	80.0
33	1971	Viktor Korchnoi	Soviet Union	10/15	66.7
34	1972	Lajos Portisch	Hungary	10½/15	70.0
35	1973	Mikhail Tal	Soviet Union	10½/15	70.0
36	1974	Walter Browne	United States	11/15	73.3
37	1975	Lajos Portisch	Hungary	10½/15	70.0
38	1976	Ljubomir Ljubojević	(Socialist Federal Republic of Yugoslavia) SFR Yugoslavia	7½/11	68.2
38	1976	Friðrik Ólafsson	Iceland	7½/11	68.2
39	1977	Gennadi Sosonko	Netherlands	8/11	72.7
39	1977	Efim Geller	Soviet Union	8/11	72.7
40	1978	Lajos Portisch	Hungary	8/11	72.7
41	1979	Lev Polugaevsky	Soviet Union	7½/11	68.2
42	1980	Walter Browne	United States	10/13	76.9
42	1980	Yasser Seirawan	United States	10/13	76.9
43	1981	Gennadi Sosonko	Netherlands	8/12	66.7
43	1981	Jan Timman	Netherlands	8/12	66.7
44	1982	John Nunn	England	8½/13	65.4
44	1982	Yuri Balashov	Soviet Union	8½/13	65.4
45	1983	Ulf Andersson	Sweden	9/13	69.2
46	1984	Alexander Beliavsky	Soviet Union	10/13	76.9
46	1984	Viktor Korchnoi	Switzerland	10/13	76.9
47	1985	Jan Timman	Netherlands	9/13	69.2
48	1986	Nigel Short	England	9½/13	73.1
49	1987	Nigel Short	England	9½/13	73.1
49	1987	Viktor Korchnoi	Switzerland	9½/13	73.1
50	1988	Anatoly Karpov	Soviet Union	9/13	69.2
51	1989	Viswanathan Anand	India	7½/13	57.7
51	1989	Gyula Sax	Hungary	7½/13	57.7
51	1989	Zoltán Ribli	Hungary	7½/13	57.7
51	1989	Predrag Nikolić	(Socialist Federal Republic of Yugoslavia) SFR Yugoslavia	7½/13	57.7
52	1990	John Nunn	England	8/13	61.5
53	1991	John Nunn	England	8½/13	65.4
54	1992	Valery Salov	Russia	8½/13	65.4
54	1992	Boris Gelfand	Belarus	8½/13	65.4
55	1993	Anatoly Karpov	Russia	2½/4 (Note: Edition was held as a single-elimination tournament)	
56	1994	Predrag Nikolić	Bosnia and Herzegovina	7/9	77.8
57	1995	Alexey Dreev	Russia	2½/4	
58	1996	Vasyl Ivanchuk	Ukraine	9/13	69.2
59	1997	Valery Salov	Russia	8½/13	65.4
60	1998	Viswanathan Anand	India	8½/13	65.4
60	1998	Vladimir Kramnik	Russia	8½/13	65.4
61	1999	Garry Kasparov	Russia	10/13	76.9

=== Corus tournament ===
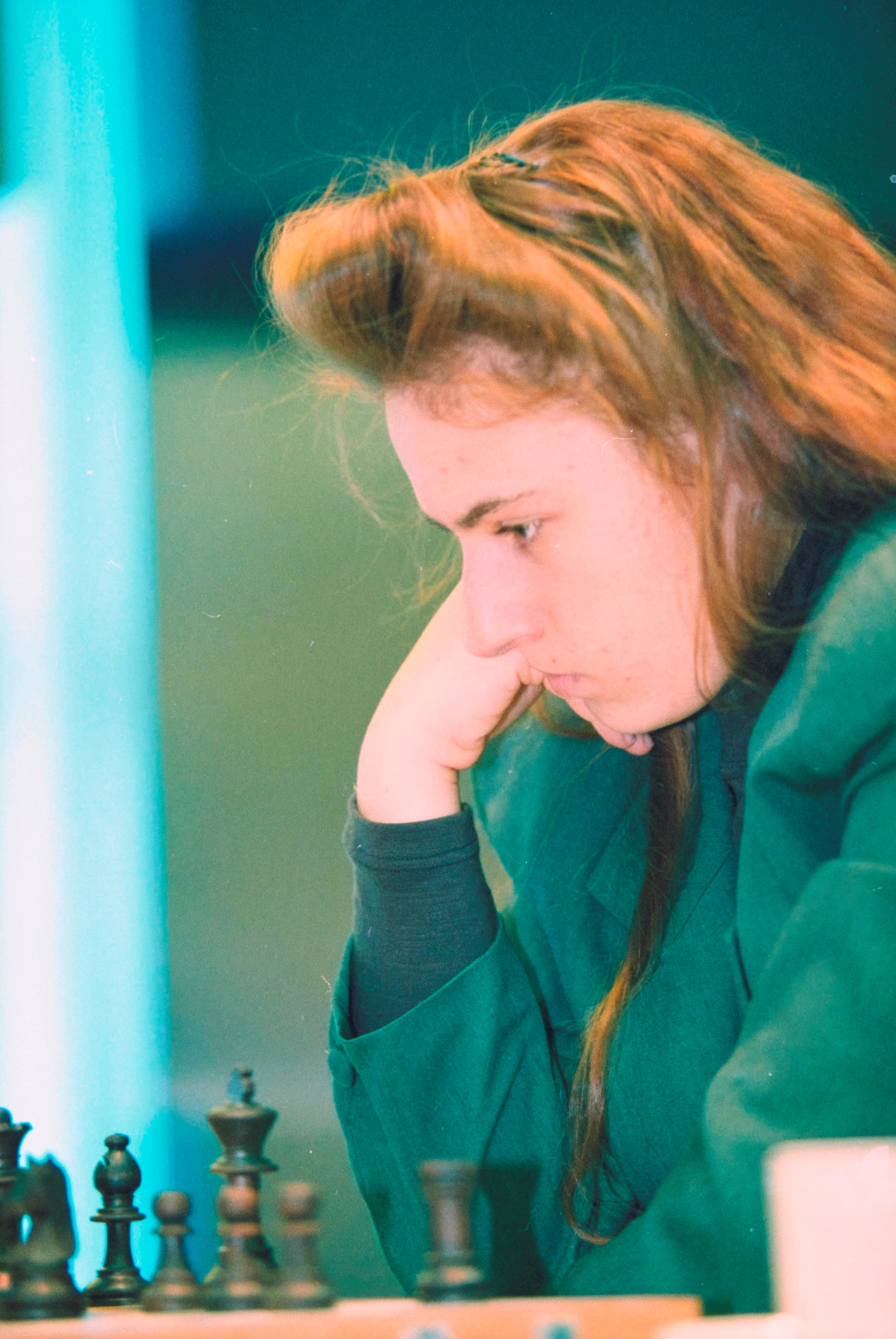
GM Judit Polgar pictured at Hoogovens 1998; she came 2nd in the 2003 edition–the highest position by a woman in the tournament

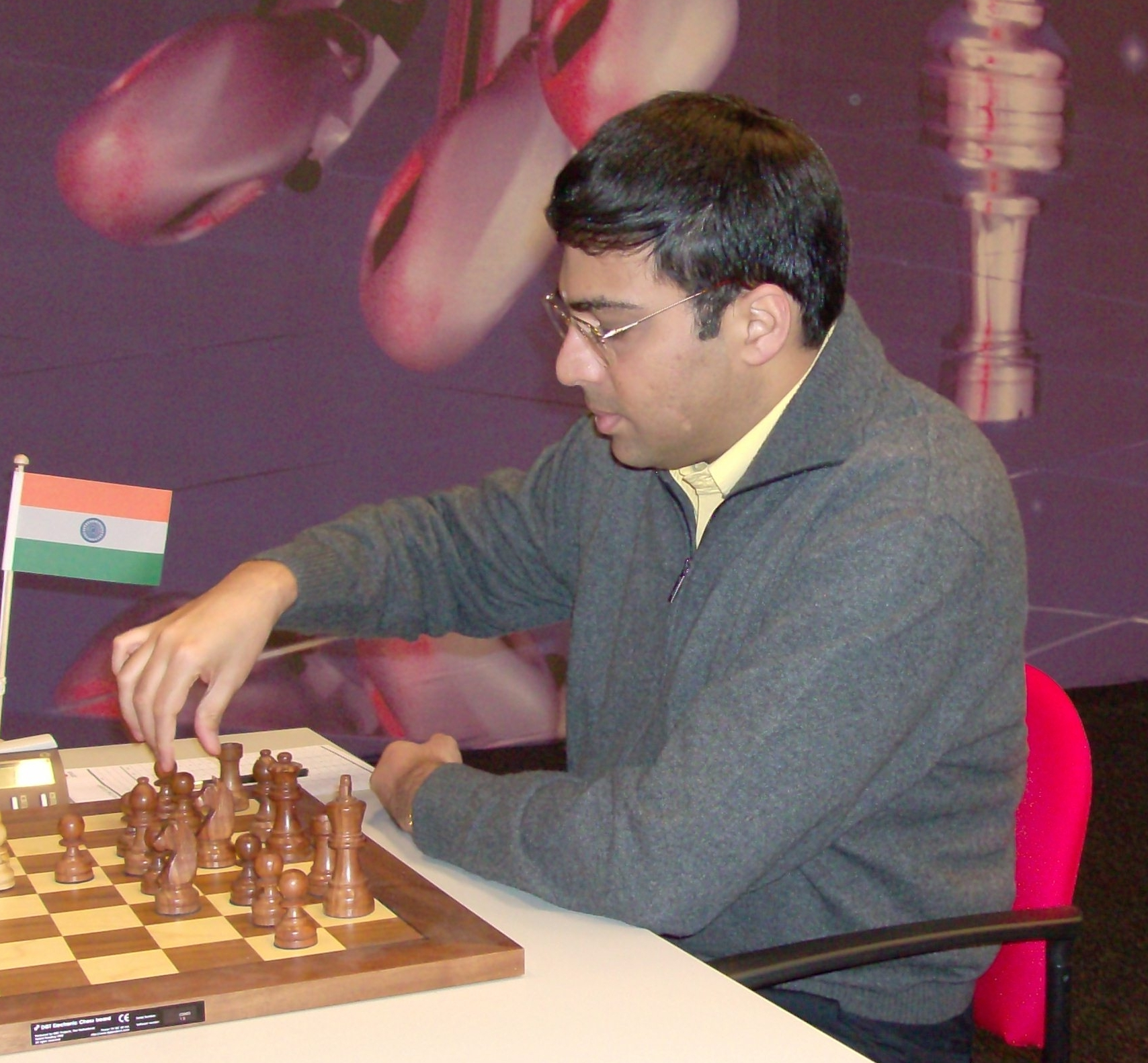
WCC Viswanathan Anand, who is also a 5 time winner, pictured at Corus 2010

From 2000, the formal name for the tournament was changed to the "Corus Chess Tournament". The winners of the A-group were:

Winners 2000-2010
#	Year	Winner(s)	Country	Score	%
62	2000	Garry Kasparov	Russia	9½/13	73.1
63	2001	Garry Kasparov	Russia	9/13	69.2
64	2002	Evgeny Bareev	Russia	9/13	69.2
65	2003	Viswanathan Anand	India	8½/13	65.4
66	2004	Viswanathan Anand	India	8½/13	65.4
67	2005	Peter Leko	Hungary	8½/13	65.4
68	2006	Viswanathan Anand	India	9/13	69.2
68	2006	Veselin Topalov	Bulgaria	9/13	69.2
69	2007	Levon Aronian	Armenia	8½/13	65.4
69	2007	Teimour Radjabov	Azerbaijan	8½/13	65.4
69	2007	Veselin Topalov	Bulgaria	8½/13	65.4
70	2008	Levon Aronian	Armenia	8/13	61.5
70	2008	Magnus Carlsen	Norway	8/13	61.5
71	2009	Sergey Karjakin	Ukraine	8/13	61.5
72	2010	Magnus Carlsen	Norway	8½/13	65.4

=== Tata Steel tournament ===
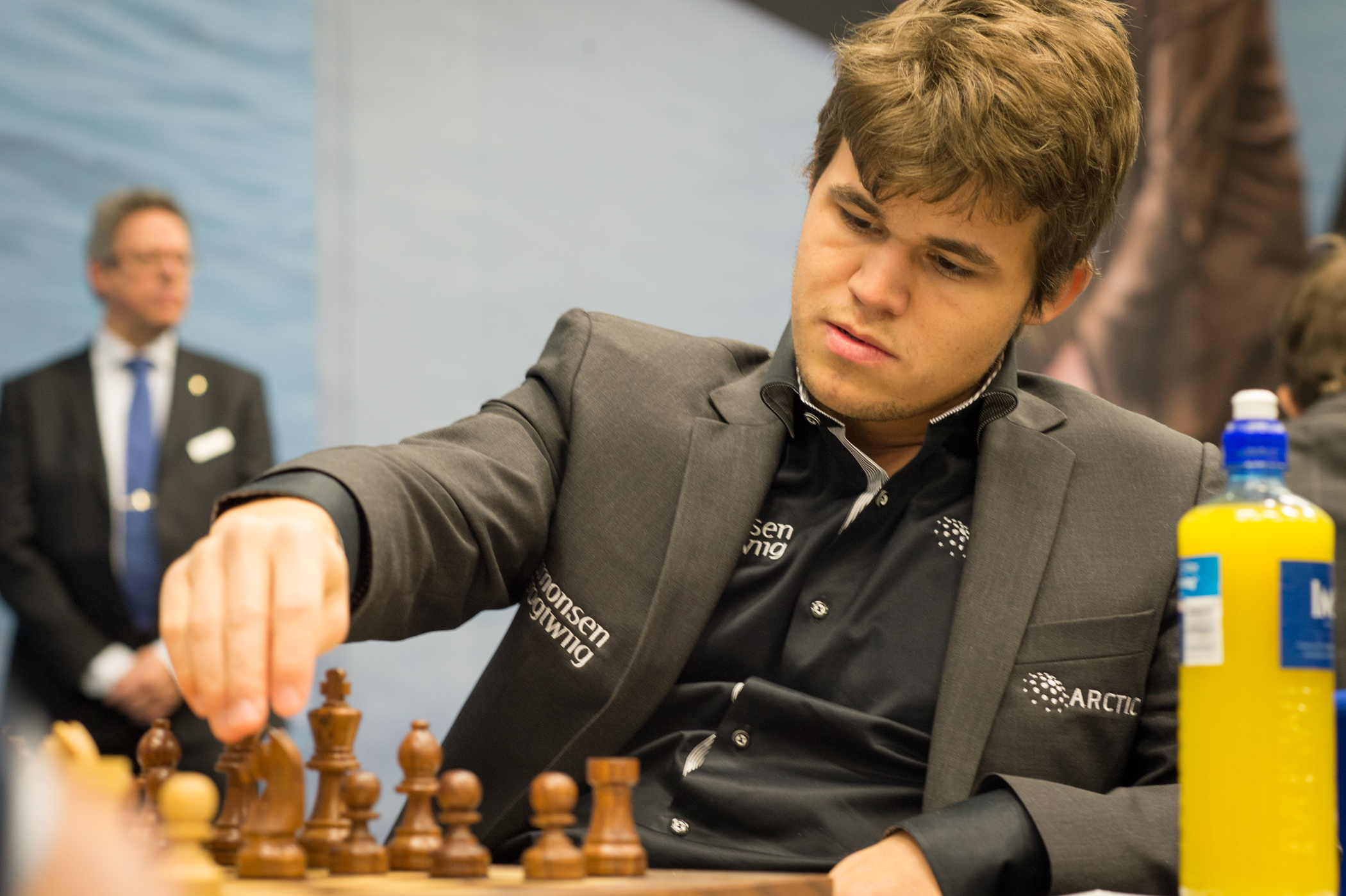
WCC Magnus Carlsen, who is also an 8 time winner, pictured at Tata Steel 2013, which he went on to win

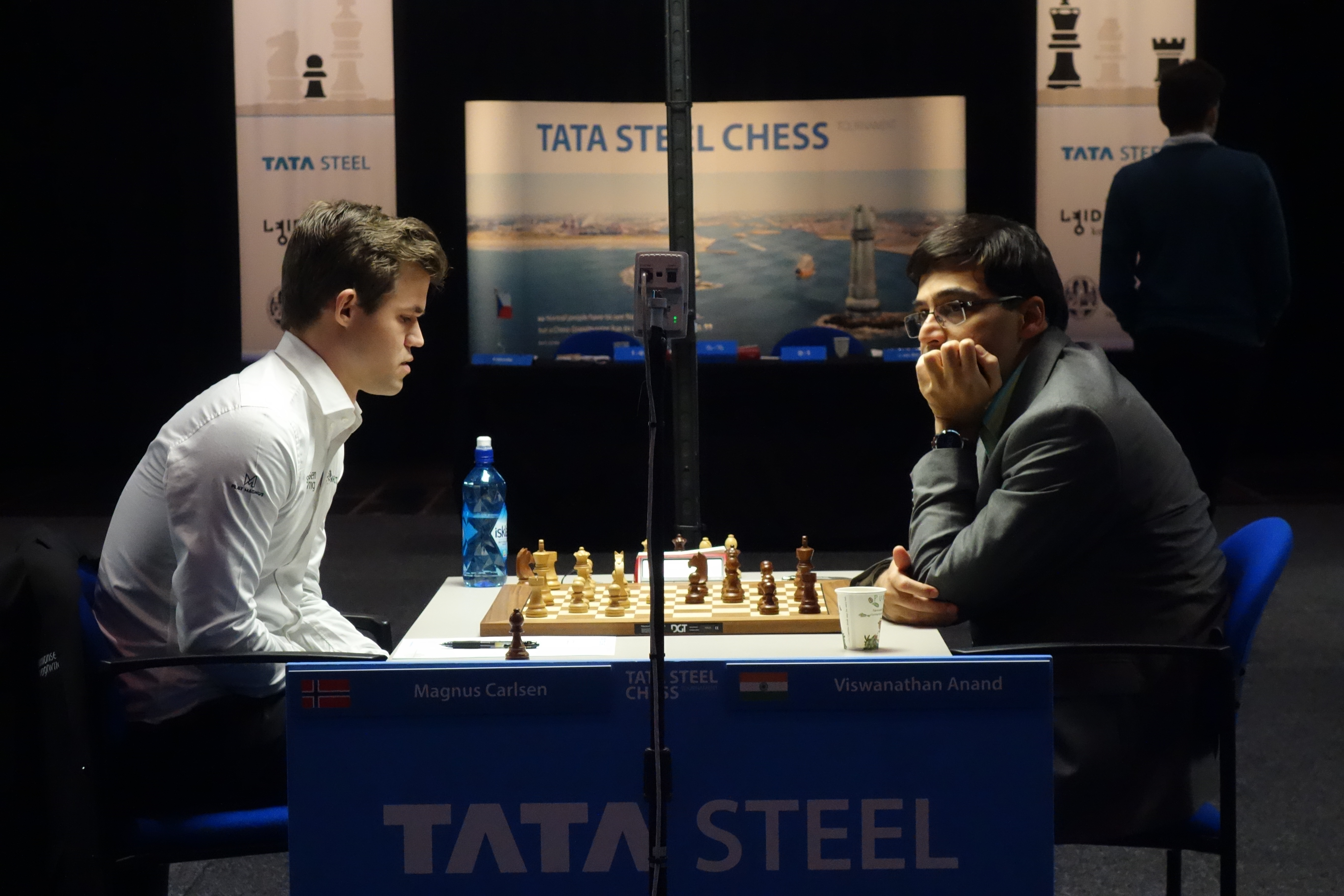
WCC Magnus Carlsen vs former WCC Viswanathan Anand, pictured at Tata Steel 2019, which Carlsen went on to win

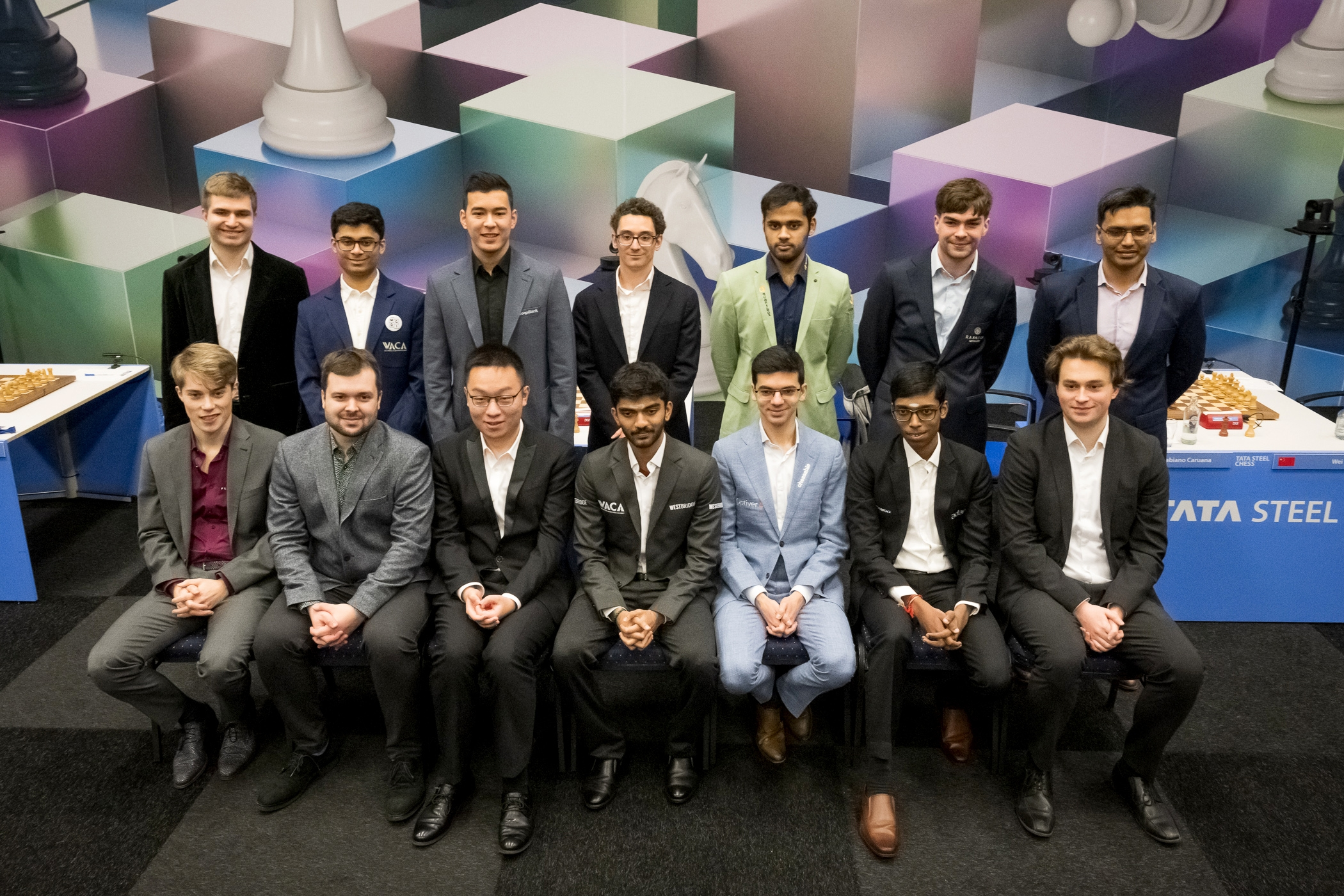
A group photo of the 14 GMs competing in the Masters section of Tata Steel Chess 2025, including WCC Gukesh Dommaraju (sitting center) and eventual winner R Praggnanandhaa (sitting, 2nd from right)

From 2011, the formal name changed to the "Tata Steel Chess Tournament". The winners of the Masters section were:

Winners 2011-present
#	Year	Winner	Country	Score	%
73	2011	Hikaru Nakamura	United States	9/13	69.2
74	2012	Levon Aronian	Armenia	9/13	69.2
75	2013	Magnus Carlsen	Norway	10/13	76.9
76	2014	Levon Aronian	Armenia	8/11	72.7
77	2015	Magnus Carlsen	Norway	9/13	69.2
78	2016	Magnus Carlsen	Norway	9/13	69.2
79	2017	Wesley So	United States	9/13	69.2
80	2018	Magnus Carlsen	Norway	9/13	69.2
81	2019	Magnus Carlsen	Norway	9/13	69.2
82	2020	Fabiano Caruana	United States	10/13	76.9
83	2021	Jorden van Foreest	Netherlands	8½/13	65.4
84	2022	Magnus Carlsen	Norway	9½/13	73.1
85	2023	Anish Giri	Netherlands	8½/13	65.4
86	2024	Wei Yi	China	8½/13	65.4
87	2025	R Praggnanandhaa	India	8½/13	65.4
88	2026	Nodirbek Abdusattorov	Uzbekistan	9/13	69.2

== Multiple winners ==
The following players have won the tournament more than once; years where they shared the title are bolded.

Multiple winners
Player	Country	Wins	Tournaments Won
Magnus Carlsen	Norway	8 (1 shared)	**2008**, 2010, 2013, 2015, 2016, 2018, 2019, 2022
Viswanathan Anand	India	5 (3 shared)	**1989**, **1998**, 2003, 2004, **2006**
Max Euwe	Netherlands	4 (1 shared)	1940, 1942, 1952, **1958**
Levon Aronian	Armenia	4 (2 shared)	**2007**, **2008**, 2012, 2014
Victor Korchnoi	Soviet Union; Switzerland	4 (2 shared)	1968, 1971, **1984**, **1987**
Lajos Portisch	Hungary	4 (1 shared)	**1965**, 1972, 1975, 1978
Jan Hein Donner	Netherlands	3 (1 shared)	1950, **1958**, 1963
Efim Geller	Soviet Union	3 (3 shared)	**1965**, **1969**, **1977**
Garry Kasparov	Russia	3	1999, 2000, 2001
John Nunn	England	3 (1 shared)	**1982**, 1990, 1991
Walter Browne	United States	2 (1 shared)	1974, **1980**
Anatoly Karpov	Soviet Union; Russia	2	1988, 1993
Bent Larsen	Denmark	2 (2 shared)	**1960**, **1961**
Predrag Nikolić	(Socialist Federal Republic of Yugoslavia) SFR Yugoslavia; Bosnia and Herzegovina	2 (1 shared)	**1989**, 1994
Friðrik Ólafsson	Iceland	2 (1 shared)	1959, **1976**
Lev Polugaevsky	Soviet Union	2	1966, 1979
Valery Salov	Russia	2 (1 shared)	**1992**, 1997
Gennadi Sosonko	Netherlands	2 (2 shared)	**1977**, **1981**
Nigel Short	England	2 (1 shared)	1986, **1987**
Jan Timman	Netherlands	2 (1 shared)	**1981**, 1985
Veselin Topalov	Bulgaria	2 (2 shared)	**2006**, **2007**
Theo van Scheltinga	Netherlands	2	1944, 1947

== See also ==
- List of strong chess tournaments
