= Theo van Scheltinga =

Dutch chess player

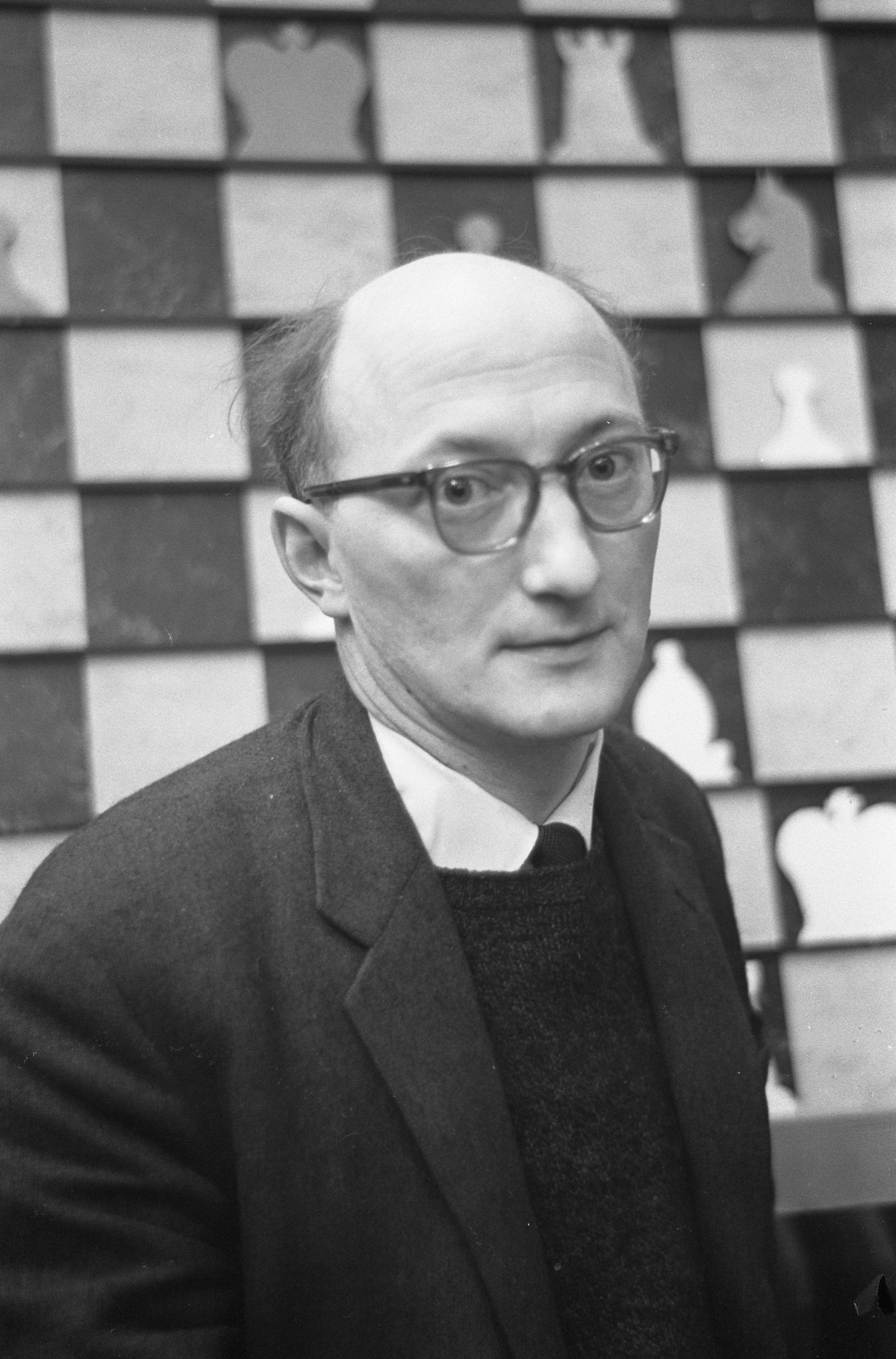
Theo van Scheltinga in 1962

Tjeerd (Theo) Daniel van Scheltinga (6 March 1914, Amsterdam – 30 July 1994) was a Dutch chess player. FIDE awarded him the International Master title in 1950.

Van Scheltinga was one of the leading Dutch players from 1936 to the late 1950s. In 1936 he was third in the Dutch Championship, and he tied for first with Max Euwe in 1947, but lost the playoff 2.5–5.5. He won Hoogovens in 1944 and 1947 and placed 2nd in 1948 and 2nd= in 1949. Van Scheltinga played in three Zonal tournaments, 4th at Hilversum 1947, 6th= at Dublin 1957 and 2nd= at Budapest 1960. He competed in the Chess Olympiads of 1937, 1939, 1950, 1952, and 1954.

Van Scheltinga worked as a carpenter at the Amsterdam Stock Exchange.
