= Hans Ree =

Dutch chess grandmaster (born 1944)

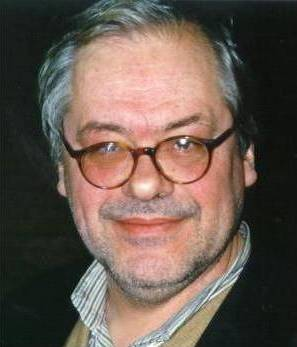

Personal information
- Born: September 15, 1944 (age 81) Amsterdam, Netherlands

Chess career
- Country: Netherlands
- Title: Grandmaster (1980)
- Peak rating: 2520 (January 1980)
- Peak ranking: No. 61 (January 1980)

Hans Ree (born 15 September 1944 in Amsterdam) is a Dutch chess grandmaster and writer. He is a chess columnist for NRC Handelsblad, and contributes to the chess magazines New In Chess and ChessCafe.com. His earlier publications include Een blinde reus (A Blind Giant, 1989), Rode dagen en zwarte dagen (Red Days, Black Days, 1993) and Schaakstukjes (Chess Pieces, 1993).

His more recent offering The Human Comedy Of Chess (Access Publishers Network, 2000) chronicles developments in the chess world in a humorous and occasionally acerbic manner, drawing on material from his columns and insider observations.

Having previously shared the title of European Junior Champion in 1964/65 and 1965/66, Ree won the Dutch Chess Championship in 1967, 1969, 1971 and 1982. Together with then reigning World Champion Boris Spassky, he was a winner of the Canadian Open Chess Championship in 1971, played in Vancouver. Ree became an International Master in 1968 and an International Grandmaster in 1980.
