= Jeroen Piket =

Dutch chess grandmaster (born 1969)

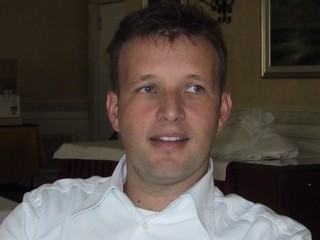
- Piket in 2005

Personal information
- Born: 27 January 1969 (age 57) Leiden, Netherlands

Chess career
- Country: Netherlands
- Title: Grandmaster (1989)
- FIDE rating: 2624 (November 2026)
- Peak rating: 2670 (January 1995)
- Peak ranking: No. 11 (January 1995)

Jeroen Piket (born 27 January 1969) is a Dutch chess grandmaster. He is a four-time Dutch Chess Champion.

== Chess career ==
Born in 1969, Piket earned his international master title in 1986 and his grandmaster title in 1989. He won the Dutch Chess Championship in 1990, 1991, 1992, and 1994. He won the Dortmund Sparkassen Chess Meeting in 1994 and shared first at the Tilburg chess tournament with Boris Gelfand in 1996. He placed second at Wijk aan Zee in 1997, and won the Biel Chess Festival in 1999. He drew a match against Anatoly Karpov held 21 February to 2 March 1999 in Monaco, by the score 4–4 (all eight games were drawn). The following year he won an internet tournament organised by kasparovchess.com, beating Garry Kasparov in the final.

Piket won the Vlissingen Open in 2001, but retired from chess in the same year to become the personal secretary of businessman Joop van Oosterom. A few years later, in 2005, Van Oosterom won the Correspondence chess World Championship, causing Tim Krabbé to write: "The Turk was operated by William Schlumberger, Mephisto was operated by Isidore Gunsberg, Ajeeb was operated by Harry Pillsbury and Joop van Oosterom is operated by Jeroen Piket."
