= Paul van der Sterren =

Dutch chess grandmaster (born 1956)

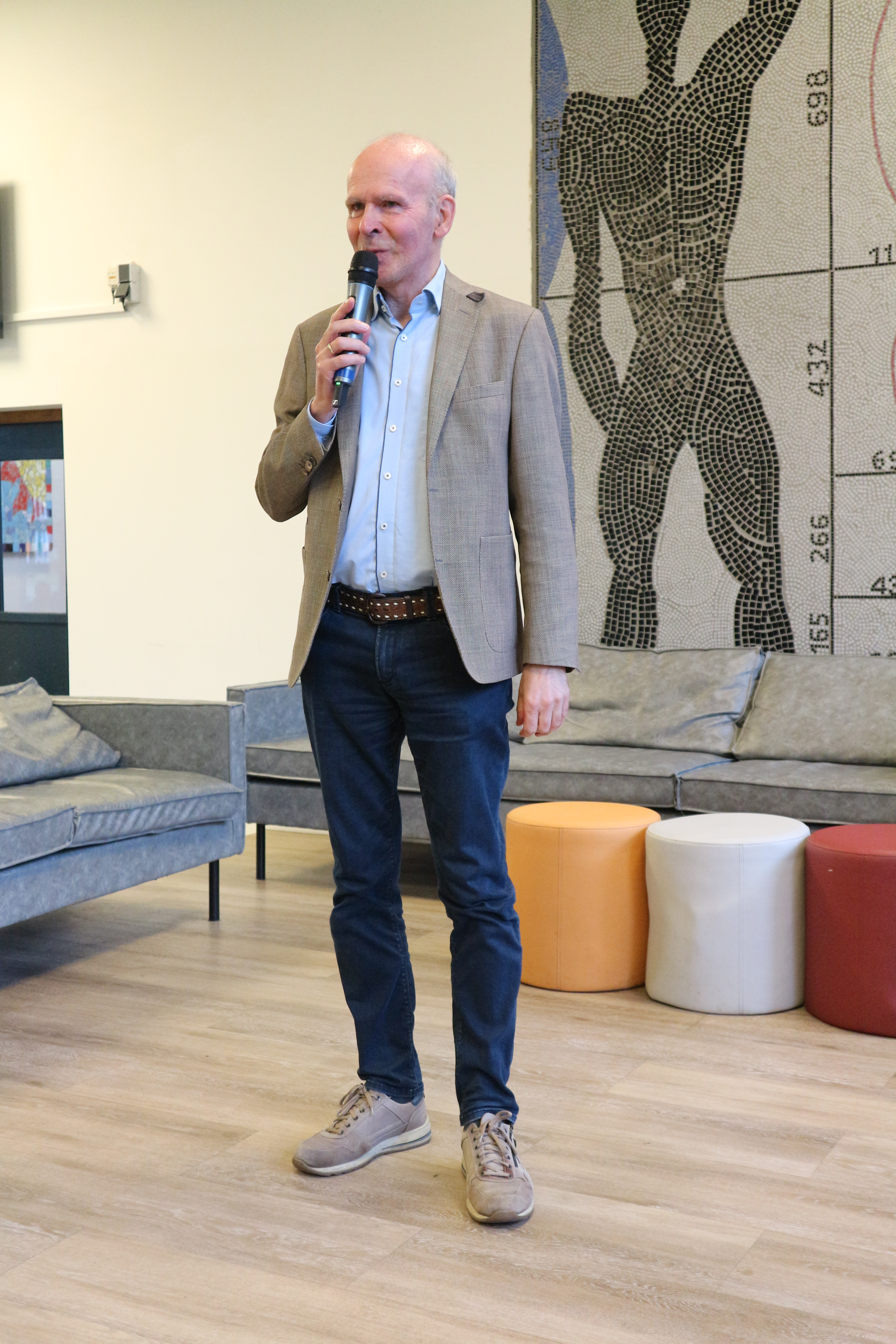
- Van der Sterren in 2023

Personal information
- Born: 17 March 1956 (age 70) Venlo, Netherlands

Chess career
- Country: Netherlands
- Title: Grandmaster (1989)
- FIDE rating: 2462 (July 2026)
- Peak rating: 2605 (January 1994)
- Peak ranking: No. 45 (January 1994)

Paul van der Sterren (born 17 March 1956) is a Dutch chess grandmaster and author.

== Chess career ==
Van der Sterren won the Dutch Chess Championship twice, in 1985 and 1993. In 1993 he qualified for the Candidates Tournament for the FIDE World Chess Championship 1996, but was eliminated in the first round (+1 −3 =3) by Gata Kamsky.

He represented the Netherlands in 11 consecutive Chess Olympiads between 1982 and 2000.

== Publications ==
- Fundamental Chess Openings. Gambit. 2009. ISBN 9781906454135.
- Your First Chess Lessons: A Simple Guide to Chess for Absolute Beginners. Gambit. 2016. ISBN 9781910093955.
- Kings of the Chessboard. Thinkers. 2019. ISBN 9789492510532.
- In Black and White: The Chess Autobiography of a World Champion Candidate. New in Chess. 2023. ISBN 9789083336510.
- Mindful Chess: The Spiritual Journey of a Professional Chess Player. New in Chess. 2024. ISBN 9789083347912.
