= Corus Chess Tournament 2004 =

Chess tournament in the Netherlands

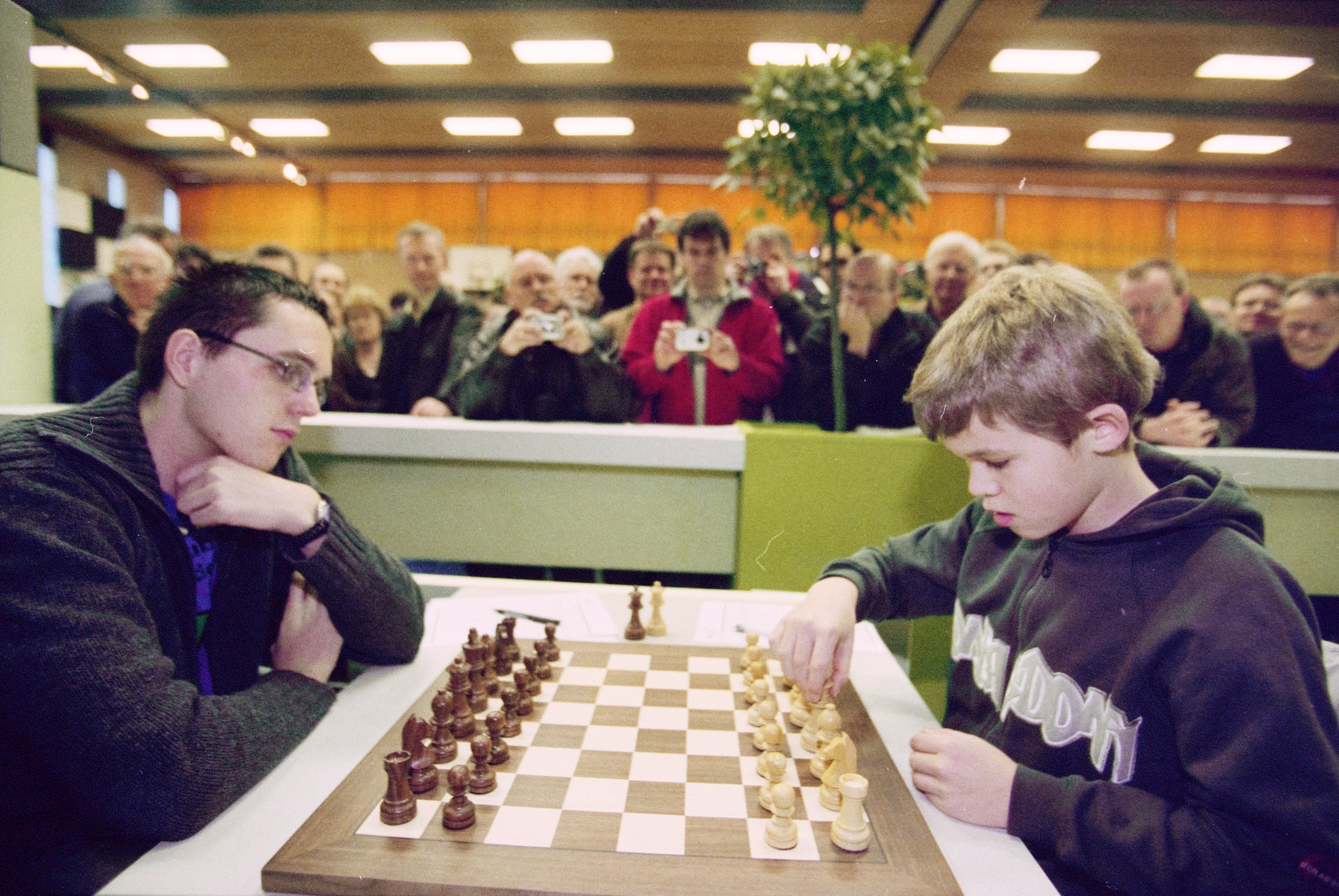
- Sipke Ernst vs. Magnus Carlsen
- Venue: Wijk aan Zee

The Corus Chess Tournament 2004 was the 66th edition of the Corus Chess Tournament. It was held in Wijk aan Zee in January 2004 and was won by Viswanathan Anand.

66th Corus Chess Tournament, grandmaster group A, 10–25 January 2004, Wijk aan Zee, Cat. XIX (2702)
| | Player | Rating | 1 | 2 | 3 | 4 | 5 | 6 | 7 | 8 | 9 | 10 | 11 | 12 | 13 | 14 | Total | SB | TPR |
|---|---|---|---|---|---|---|---|---|---|---|---|---|---|---|---|---|---|---|---|
| 1 | Viswanathan Anand (India) | 2766 | | ½ | ½ | 0 | ½ | ½ | 1 | ½ | ½ | 1 | 1 | ½ | 1 | 1 | 8½ | | 2808 |
| 2 | Peter Leko (Hungary) | 2722 | ½ | | ½ | ½ | 1 | ½ | ½ | ½ | ½ | ½ | ½ | ½ | 1 | 1 | 8 | 49.75 | 2788 |
| 3 | Michael Adams (England) | 2720 | ½ | ½ | | ½ | ½ | 1 | 1 | 0 | ½ | ½ | ½ | ½ | 1 | 1 | 8 | 49.25 | 2788 |
| 4 | Veselin Topalov (Bulgaria) | 2735 | 1 | ½ | ½ | | 1 | ½ | 0 | ½ | 0 | 1 | ½ | ½ | ½ | 1 | 7½ | 48.50 | 2757 |
| 5 | Victor Bologan (Moldova) | 2679 | ½ | 0 | ½ | 0 | | ½ | ½ | 1 | 1 | 1 | 1 | 1 | ½ | 0 | 7½ | 46.75 | 2761 |
| 6 | Vladimir Kramnik (Russia) | 2777 | ½ | ½ | 0 | ½ | ½ | | ½ | 1 | 1 | 0 | ½ | 0 | 1 | ½ | 6½ | 41.50 | 2697 |
| 7 | Evgeny Bareev (Russia) | 2714 | 0 | ½ | 0 | 1 | ½ | ½ | | ½ | 0 | 1 | 1 | 1 | ½ | 0 | 6½ | 41.25 | 2702 |
| 8 | Loek van Wely (Netherlands) | 2617 | ½ | ½ | 1 | ½ | 0 | 0 | ½ | | ½ | ½ | ½ | ½ | ½ | 1 | 6½ | 41.25 | 2709 |
| 9 | Peter Svidler (Russia) | 2747 | ½ | ½ | ½ | 1 | 0 | 0 | 1 | ½ | | 0 | ½ | ½ | ½ | ½ | 6 | 39.50 | 2670 |
| 10 | Vladimir Akopian (Armenia) | 2693 | 0 | ½ | ½ | 0 | 0 | 1 | ½ | ½ | ½ | | ½ | 1 | 1 | 1 | 6 | 36.25 | 2674 |
| 11 | Alexei Shirov (Spain) | 2736 | 0 | ½ | ½ | ½ | 0 | ½ | 0 | ½ | ½ | ½ | | 1 | ½ | 1 | 6 | 35.75 | 2671 |
| 12 | Ivan Sokolov (Netherlands) | 2706 | ½ | ½ | ½ | ½ | 0 | 1 | 0 | ½ | ½ | 0 | 0 | | ½ | ½ | 5 | 33.25 | 2615 |
| 13 | Zhang Zhong (China) | 2644 | 0 | 0 | 0 | ½ | ½ | 0 | ½ | ½ | ½ | ½ | ½ | ½ | | 1 | 5 | 29.50 | 2620 |
| 14 | Jan Timman (Netherlands) | 2578 | 0 | 0 | 0 | 0 | 1 | ½ | 1 | 0 | ½ | ½ | 0 | ½ | 0 | | 4 | | 2571 |

66th Corus Chess Tournament, grandmaster group B, 10–25 January 2004, Wijk aan Zee, Cat. XIII (2560)
| | Player | Rating | 1 | 2 | 3 | 4 | 5 | 6 | 7 | 8 | 9 | 10 | 11 | 12 | 13 | 14 | Total | SB | TPR |
|---|---|---|---|---|---|---|---|---|---|---|---|---|---|---|---|---|---|---|---|
| 1 | GM Lázaro Bruzón (Cuba) | 2603 | | ½ | ½ | 0 | ½ | 1 | 1 | ½ | 0 | 1 | 1 | 1 | 1 | 1 | 9 | | 2698 |
| 2 | GM Leinier Domínguez (Cuba) | 2605 | ½ | | ½ | ½ | 1 | ½ | ½ | ½ | ½ | ½ | 1 | 1 | ½ | 1 | 8½ | | 2667 |
| 3 | GM Laurent Fressinet (France) | 2636 | ½ | ½ | | 0 | 1 | 0 | 0 | 1 | ½ | 1 | 1 | 1 | 1 | ½ | 8 | | 2641 |
| 4 | GM Hikaru Nakamura (United States) | 2571 | 1 | ½ | 1 | | 0 | ½ | 0 | 1 | ½ | ½ | ½ | 1 | 1 | 0 | 7½ | 49.25 | 2616 |
| 5 | GM Julio Granda Zúñiga (Peru) | 2581 | ½ | 0 | 0 | 1 | | ½ | 1 | 1 | 1 | 0 | ½ | 0 | 1 | 1 | 7½ | 46.25 | 2616 |
| 6 | IM Daniël Stellwagen (Netherlands) | 2489 | 0 | ½ | 1 | ½ | ½ | | ½ | 1 | 0 | 1 | ½ | 0 | ½ | ½ | 6½ | 42.25 | 2566 |
| 7 | GM Arkadij Naiditsch (Germany) | 2576 | 0 | ½ | 1 | 1 | 0 | ½ | | ½ | 1 | 0 | 0 | 1 | 0 | 1 | 6½ | 41.75 | 2559 |
| 8 | GM Sergei Tiviakov (Netherlands) | 2600 | ½ | ½ | 0 | 0 | 0 | 0 | ½ | | 1 | ½ | 1 | 1 | ½ | 1 | 6½ | 37.75 | 2557 |
| 9 | GM Antoaneta Stefanova (Bulgaria) | 2478 | 1 | ½ | ½ | ½ | 0 | 1 | 0 | 0 | | ½ | ½ | 0 | ½ | 1 | 6 | | 2537 |
| 10 | GM Zhu Chen (China) | 2490 | 0 | ½ | 0 | ½ | 1 | 0 | 1 | ½ | ½ | | 0 | 0 | 1 | ½ | 5½ | | 2509 |
| 11 | GM Hichem Hamdouchi (Morocco) | 2588 | 0 | 0 | 0 | ½ | ½ | ½ | 1 | 0 | ½ | 1 | | ½ | 0 | ½ | 5 | 30.50 | 2471 |
| 12 | GM Friso Nijboer (Netherlands) | 2586 | 0 | 0 | 0 | 0 | 1 | 1 | 0 | 0 | 1 | 1 | ½ | | ½ | 0 | 5 | 30.50 | 2471 |
| 13 | GM Eric Lobron (Germany) | 2497 | 0 | ½ | 0 | 0 | 0 | ½ | 1 | ½ | ½ | 0 | 1 | ½ | | ½ | 5 | 30.00 | 2478 |
| 14 | GM John van der Wiel (Netherlands) | 2542 | 0 | 0 | ½ | 1 | 0 | ½ | 0 | 0 | 0 | ½ | ½ | 1 | ½ | | 4½ | | 2452 |

66th Corus Chess Tournament, grandmaster group C, 10–25 January 2004, Wijk aan Zee, Cat. IX (2454)
| | Player | Rating | 1 | 2 | 3 | 4 | 5 | 6 | 7 | 8 | 9 | 10 | 11 | 12 | 13 | 14 | Total | SB | TPR |
|---|---|---|---|---|---|---|---|---|---|---|---|---|---|---|---|---|---|---|---|
| 1 | IM Magnus Carlsen (Norway) | 2484 | | 1 | ½ | 1 | 1 | 1 | 1 | 0 | ½ | ½ | 1 | 1 | 1 | 1 | 10½ | | 2702 |
| 2 | IM Sipke Ernst (Netherlands) | 2474 | 0 | | 1 | 1 | ½ | ½ | 1 | ½ | ½ | 1 | 1 | 1 | 1 | 1 | 10 | | 2663 |
| 3 | IM Jan Smeets (Netherlands) | 2505 | ½ | 0 | | ½ | 1 | ½ | 0 | 1 | 1 | 1 | ½ | 1 | 1 | 1 | 9 | | 2591 |
| 4 | GM Miloš Pavlović (Serbia and Montenegro) | 2548 | 0 | 0 | ½ | | ½ | ½ | 1 | 0 | ½ | 1 | 1 | 1 | 1 | 1 | 8 | 40.00 | 2533 |
| 5 | IM Jan Werle (Netherlands) | 2407 | 0 | ½ | 0 | ½ | | 0 | ½ | ½ | 1 | 1 | 1 | 1 | 1 | 1 | 8 | 39.75 | 2544 |
| 6 | GM Merab Gagunashvili (Georgia) | 2583 | 0 | ½ | ½ | ½ | 1 | | ½ | 1 | ½ | 0 | 1 | 0 | 1 | 1 | 7½ | 43.00 | 2501 |
| 7 | WGM Tea Lanchava (Netherlands) | 2323 | 0 | 0 | 1 | 0 | ½ | ½ | | 1 | ½ | 1 | 0 | 1 | 1 | 1 | 7½ | 38.00 | 2521 |
| 8 | GM Duško Pavasovič (Slovenia) | 2615 | 1 | ½ | 0 | 1 | ½ | 0 | 0 | | 0 | ½ | ½ | 1 | 1 | 1 | 7 | | 2470 |
| 9 | WGM Kateryna Lagno (Ukraine) | 2493 | ½ | ½ | 0 | ½ | 0 | ½ | ½ | 1 | | ½ | ½ | 0 | 1 | 1 | 6½ | | 2451 |
| 10 | IM Ruud Janssen (Netherlands) | 2489 | ½ | 0 | 0 | 0 | 0 | 1 | 0 | ½ | ½ | | ½ | 1 | 1 | 1 | 6 | 27.25 | 2422 |
| 11 | GM Valerij Popov (Russia) | 2580 | 0 | 0 | ½ | 0 | 0 | 0 | 1 | ½ | ½ | ½ | | 1 | 1 | 1 | 6 | 26.75 | 2415 |
| 12 | WGM Peng Zhaoqin (Netherlands) | 2419 | 0 | 0 | 0 | 0 | 0 | 1 | 0 | 0 | 1 | 0 | 0 | | ½ | 1 | 3½ | | 2281 |
| 13 | FM Maarten Etmans (Netherlands) | 2225 | 0 | 0 | 0 | 0 | 0 | 0 | 0 | 0 | 0 | 0 | 0 | ½ | | ½ | 1 | | 2070 |
| 14 | Ted Barendse (Netherlands) | 2206 | 0 | 0 | 0 | 0 | 0 | 0 | 0 | 0 | 0 | 0 | 0 | 0 | ½ | | ½ | | 1972 |
