= Corus Chess Tournament 2007 =

Chess tournament in the Netherlands

- Venue: Wijk aan Zee

The Corus Chess Tournament 2007 was the 69th edition of the Corus Chess Tournament. It was held in Wijk aan Zee in January 2007 and was won jointly by Levon Aronian, Veselin Topalov, and Teimour Radjabov.

69th Corus Chess Tournament, grandmaster group A, 13–28 January 2007, Wijk aan Zee, Cat. XIX (2719)
	Player	Rating	1	2	3	4	5	6	7	8	9	10	11	12	13	14	Total	SB	TPR
1	Levon Aronian (Armenia)	2744		½	1	½	½	½	½	1	1	½	1	½	½	½	8½	54.25	2827
2	Veselin Topalov (Bulgaria)	2783	½		½	½	1	0	½	½	1	½	½	1	1	1	8½	51.50	2824
3	Teimour Radjabov (Azerbaijan)	2729	0	½		½	½	½	1	½	½	1	1	1	½	1	8½	50.00	2828
4	Vladimir Kramnik (Russia)	2766	½	½	½		1	½	½	½	½	½	½	1	½	1	8		2802
5	Viswanathan Anand (India)	2779	½	0	½	0		1	½	1	½	1	½	1	½	½	7½		2771
6	Peter Svidler (Russia)	2728	½	1	½	½	0		½	0	½	1	1	0	1	½	7		2747
7	David Navara (Czech Republic)	2719	½	½	0	½	½	½		0	1	½	½	1	1	0	6½	40.25	2719
8	Sergey Karjakin (Ukraine)	2678	0	½	½	½	0	1	1		0	½	½	½	½	1	6½	40.25	2722
9	Ruslan Ponomariov (Ukraine)	2723	0	0	½	½	½	½	0	1		½	½	½	1	½	6		2690
10	Alexander Motylev (Russia)	2647	½	½	0	½	0	0	½	½	½		½	½	½	½	5	31.50	2638
11	Sergei Tiviakov (Netherlands)	2667	0	½	0	½	½	0	½	½	½	½		½	½	½	5	31.00	2635
12	Loek van Wely (Netherlands)	2683	½	0	0	0	0	1	0	½	½	½	½		½	1	5	29.25	2635
13	Magnus Carlsen (Norway)	2690	½	0	½	½	½	0	0	½	0	½	½	½		½	4½	29.25	2611
14	Alexei Shirov (Spain)	2715	½	0	0	0	½	½	1	0	½	½	½	0	½		4½	28.25	2609

69th Corus Chess Tournament, grandmaster group B, 13–28 January 2007, Wijk aan Zee, Cat. XIV (2600)
	Player	Rating	1	2	3	4	5	6	7	8	9	10	11	12	13	14	Total	SB	TPR
1	GM Pavel Eljanov (Ukraine)	2675		0	1	½	1	0	½	½	1	½	1	1	1	1	9		2736
2	GM Gabriel Sargissian (Armenia)	2658	1		½	1	½	½	1	1	0	½	½	1	0	½	8	54.25	2683
3	GM Bu Xiangzhi (China)	2644	0	½		½	1	1	½	1	½	1	½	½	½	½	8	51.00	2684
4	GM Dmitry Jakovenko (Russia)	2691	½	0	½		1	0	½	½	1	1	½	1	½	1	8	47.75	2680
5	GM Maxime Vachier-Lagrave (France)	2573	0	½	0	0		1	1	1	½	½	1	1	1	½	8	46.25	2689
6	GM Erwin l'Ami (Netherlands)	2594	1	½	0	1	0		½	½	1	½	½	0	1	1	7½		2658
7	GM Daniël Stellwagen (Netherlands)	2585	½	0	½	½	0	½		½	½	1	½	½	1	1	7	40.75	2631
8	GM Victor Bologan (Moldova)	2658	½	0	0	½	0	½	½		1	1	½	1	½	1	7	40.00	2625
9	GM Jan Smeets (Netherlands)	2538	0	1	½	0	½	0	½	0		½	1	1	1	0	6		2576
10	GM Friso Nijboer (Netherlands)	2638	½	½	0	0	½	½	0	0	½		1	½	1	½	5½		2540
11	GM Suat Atalık (Turkey)	2586	0	½	½	½	0	½	½	½	0	0		½	0	1	4½	29.00	2491
12	GM Jan Werle (Netherlands)	2566	0	0	½	0	0	1	½	0	0	½	½		1	½	4½	26.00	2493
13	IM Tatiana Kosintseva (Russia)	2474	0	1	½	½	0	0	0	½	0	0	1	0		½	4	26.00	2469
14	GM Vladimir Georgiev (Macedonia)	2525	0	½	½	0	½	0	0	0	1	½	0	½	½		4	25.00	2465

69th Corus Chess Tournament, grandmaster group C, 13–28 January 2007, Wijk aan Zee, Cat. X (2486)
	Player	Rating	1	2	3	4	5	6	7	8	9	10	11	12	13	14	Total	SB	TPR
1	GM Michał Krasenkow (Poland)	2651		0	1	½	1	1	½	1	1	1	1	1	½	1	10½		2725
2	IM Ian Nepomniachtchi (Russia)	2587	1		½	½	½	½	1	1	1	0	1	1	1	1	10		2690
3	GM Emanuel Berg (Sweden)	2586	0	½		1	½	1	½	1	1	1	½	0	½	½	8		2566
4	GM Parimarjan Negi (India)	2538	½	½	0		1	1	1	0	½	0	½	1	½	1	7½		2539
5	WFM Hou Yifan (China)	2509	0	½	½	0		1	1	½	½	1	½	1	½	0	7	42.75	2514
6	IM Wouter Spoelman (Netherlands)	2414	0	½	0	0	0		½	1	½	1	1	1	½	1	7	38.00	2521
7	GM John van der Wiel (Netherlands)	2511	½	0	½	0	0	½		1	½	½	½	1	½	½	6	35.50	2455
8	IM Manuel Bosboom (Netherlands)	2375	0	0	0	1	½	0	0		1	0	1	½	1	1	6	32.25	2466
9	IM Edwin van Haastert (Netherlands)	2391	0	0	0	½	½	½	½	0		½	½	1	1	1	6	31.25	2465
10	IM Nadezhda Kosintseva (Russia)	2496	0	1	0	1	0	0	½	1	½		½	0	1	0	5½	36.25	2429
11	GM Peng Zhaoqin (Netherlands)	2431	0	0	½	½	½	0	½	0	½	½		1	½	1	5½	30.00	2434
12	GM Harmen Jonkman (Netherlands)	2425	0	0	1	0	0	0	0	½	0	1	0		1	1	4½		2381
13	GM Stellan Brynell (Sweden)	2501	½	0	½	½	½	½	½	0	0	0	½	0		½	4		2344
14	IM Thomas Willemze (Netherlands)	2393	0	0	½	0	1	0	½	0	0	1	0	0	½		3½		2318
