= Corus Chess Tournament 2003 =

Chess tournament in the Netherlands

- Venue: Wijk aan Zee

The Corus Chess Tournament 2003 was the 65th edition of the Corus Chess Tournament. It was held in Wijk aan Zee in January 2003 and was won by Viswanathan Anand.

65th Corus Chess Tournament, grandmaster group A, 11–26 January 2003, Wijk aan Zee, Cat. XIX (2701)
	Player	Rating	1	2	3	4	5	6	7	8	9	10	11	12	13	14	Total	SB	TPR
1	Viswanathan Anand (India)	2753		½	½	1	½	½	½	½	½	1	1	1	½	½	8½		2806
2	Judit Polgár (Hungary)	2700	½		½	½	½	1	½	½	½	½	1	½	½	1	8		2788
3	Evgeny Bareev (Russia)	2729	½	½		0	0	1	1	0	1	½	½	1	½	1	7½		2755
4	Alexei Shirov (Spain)	2723	0	½	1		1	0	½	1	½	½	½	1	0	½	7	45.75	2728
5	Loek van Wely (Netherlands)	2668	½	½	1	0		½	½	1	½	1	0	0	½	1	7	44.25	2732
6	Alexander Grischuk (Russia)	2712	½	0	0	1	½		½	½	1	½	½	½	1	½	7	43.25	2729
7	Vasyl Ivanchuk (Ukraine)	2699	½	½	0	½	½	½		½	½	½	½	1	½	1	7	42.50	2730
8	Vladimir Kramnik (Russia)	2807	½	½	1	0	0	½	½		½	1	½	0	1	1	7	42.50	2721
9	Teimour Radjabov (Azerbaijan)	2624	½	½	0	½	½	0	½	½		0	½	1	1	1	6½	38.25	2706
10	Veselin Topalov (Bulgaria)	2743	0	½	½	½	0	½	½	0	1		½	½	1	1	6½	37.75	2697
11	Anatoly Karpov (Russia)	2688	0	0	½	½	1	½	½	½	½	½		0	1	½	6	37.00	2672
12	Ruslan Ponomariov (Ukraine)	2734	0	½	0	0	1	½	0	1	0	½	1		½	1	6	35.50	2669
13	Michał Krasenkow (Poland)	2633	½	½	½	1	½	0	½	0	0	0	0	½		½	4½		2596
14	Jan Timman (Netherlands)	2594	½	0	0	½	0	½	0	0	0	0	½	0	½		2½		2458

65th Corus Chess Tournament, grandmaster group B, 11–26 January 2003, Wijk aan Zee, Cat. XI (2525)
	Player	Rating	1	2	3	4	5	6	7	8	9	10	11	12	13	14	Total	SB	TPR
1	GM Zhang Zhong (China)	2624		1	1	1	½	1	½	1	1	0	1	1	1	1	11		2813
2	FM Daniël Stellwagen (Netherlands)	2427	0		1	½	½	½	½	0	1	1	1	1	1	0	8	48.50	2620
3	GM Arkadij Naiditsch (Germany)	2585	0	0		1	1	1	0	½	1	½	1	1	0	1	8	47.25	2607
4	GM Friso Nijboer (Netherlands)	2553	0	½	0		0	0	1	1	½	½	1	1	1	1	7½		2580
5	GM Sergey Karjakin (Ukraine)	2547	½	½	0	1		½	½	½	½	1	½	½	1	0	7		2552
6	GM Dennis de Vreugt (Netherlands)	2504	0	½	0	1	½		½	½	1	½	0	0	1	1	6½		2527
7	GM Péter Ács (Hungary)	2623	½	½	1	0	½	½		1	0	0	1	0	½	½	6	40.25	2489
8	GM John van der Wiel (Netherlands)	2509	0	1	½	0	½	½	0		½	½	½	1	½	½	6	36.75	2497
9	WGM Humpy Koneru (India)	2496	0	0	0	½	½	0	1	½		1	0	½	1	1	6	33.25	2498
10	GM Ian Rogers (Australia)	2569	1	0	½	½	0	½	1	½	0		½	0	½	½	5½	38.25	2465
11	GM Jonny Hector (Sweden)	2570	0	0	0	0	½	1	0	½	1	½		½	½	1	5½	30.75	2465
12	WGM Alexandra Kosteniuk (Russia)	2456	0	0	0	0	½	1	1	0	½	1	½		0	½	5	29.25	2443
13	GM Harmen Jonkman (Netherlands)	2436	0	0	1	0	0	0	½	½	0	½	½	1		1	5	28.50	2445
14	WGM Viktorija Čmilytė (Lithuania)	2452	0	1	0	0	1	0	½	½	0	½	0	½	0		4		2390

65th Corus Chess Tournament, invitation tens, 17–26 January 2003, Wijk aan Zee, Cat. VIII (2434)
	Player	Rating	1	2	3	4	5	6	7	8	9	10	Total	SB	TPR
1	GM Eric Lobron (Germany)	2506		0	1	½	½	1	1	1	1	1	7		2646
2	IM Ruud Janssen (Netherlands)	2470	1		½	0	½	1	½	1	1	1	6½	25.00	2596
3	GM Bu Xiangzhi (China)	2569	0	½		1	1	½	1	½	1	1	6½	24.25	2585
4	IM Alexander Cherniaev (Russia)	2504	½	1	0		½	1	½	1	½	1	6		2551
5	GM Mišo Cebalo (Croatia)	2527	½	½	0	½		½	1	½	1	1	5½		2503
6	Erwin l'Ami (Netherlands)	2438	0	0	½	0	½		1	1	1	1	5		2476
7	FM Marcel Peek (Netherlands)	2417	0	½	0	½	0	0		½	½	1	3	9.50	2310
8	FM Marc Erwich (Netherlands)	2342	0	0	½	0	½	0	½		½	1	3	9.25	2319
9	FM Sybolt Strating (Netherlands)	2325	0	0	0	½	0	0	½	½		0	1½		2173
10	Wim Boom (Netherlands)	2238	0	0	0	0	0	0	0	0	1		1		2104
