= Corus Chess Tournament 2009 =

Chess tournament 2009

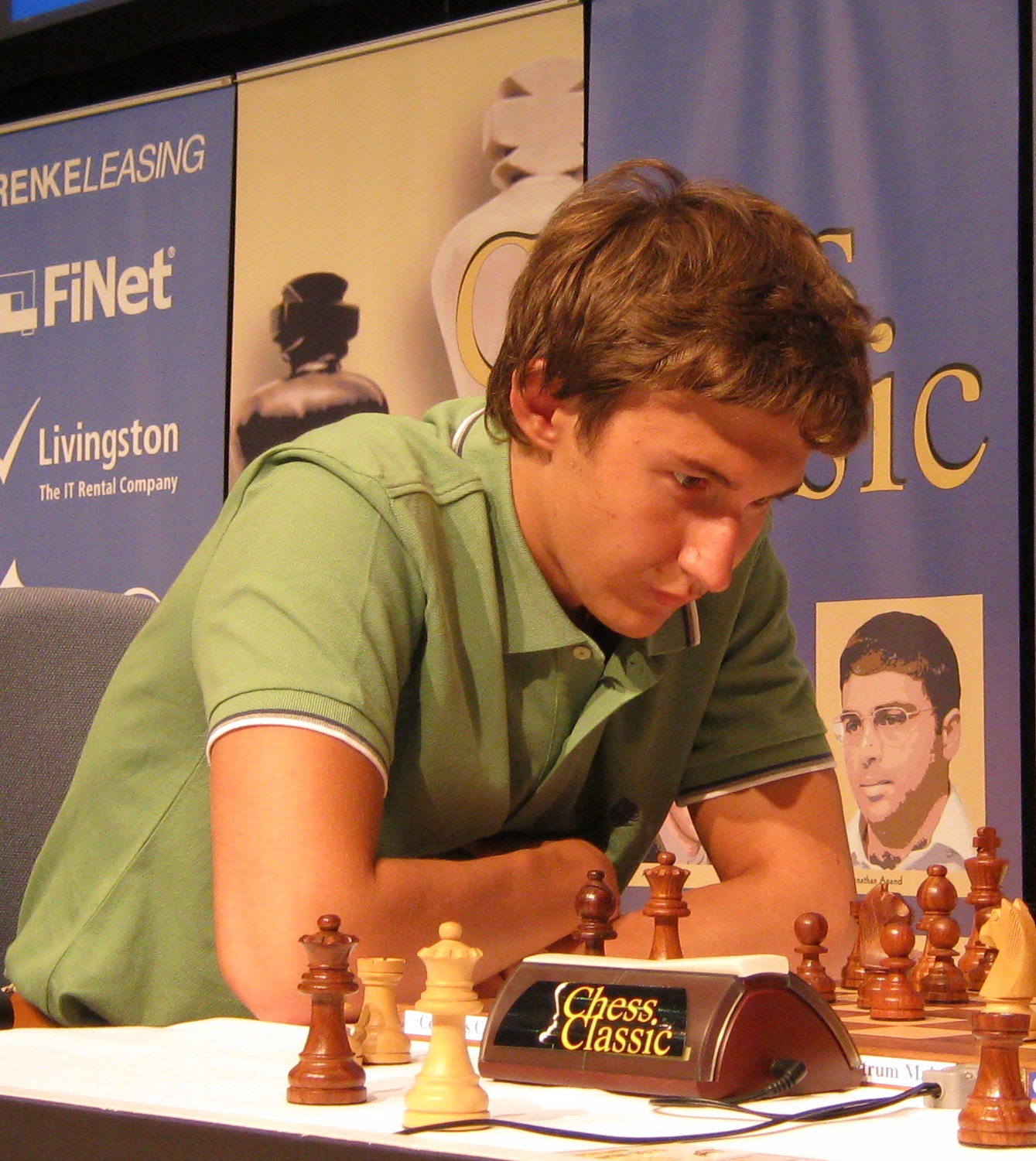
- Sergey Karjakin pictured in 2010
- Location: Wijk aan Zee, Netherlands
- Dates: 17 January – 1 February 2009
- Competitors: 42
- Winning score: 8 points of 13

Champion
- (Ukraine) Sergey Karjakin

The Corus Chess Tournament 2009 was the 71st edition of the Corus Chess Tournament, later known as the Tata Steel Chess Tournament. It was held in Wijk aan Zee from 17 January to 1 February 2009.

The tournament was won by Sergey Karjakin. Karjakin entered the final round as one of six players in the joint lead, but was the only one to claim victory, defeating Leinier Domínguez to emerge sole winner.

Fabiano Caruana won the B section, having won the C section in 2008. Caruana was half a point behind Nigel Short, his final opponent, going into the last round. Caruana was outplayed, but Short missed two clear wins, and then a draw, handing the victory to his teenage opponent.

71st Corus Chess Tournament, grandmaster group A, 17 January – 1 February 2009, Wijk aan Zee, Cat. XIX (2716)
	Player	Rating	1	2	3	4	5	6	7	8	9	10	11	12	13	14	Total	SB	TPR
1	Sergey Karjakin (Ukraine)	2706		½	½	1	½	1	0	½	½	½	0	1	1	1	8		2804
2	Levon Aronian (Armenia)	2750	½		½	1	½	0	1	½	½	½	½	½	1	½	7½	48.00	2770
3	Teimour Radjabov (Azerbaijan)	2761	½	½		½	½	½	1	0	1	½	1	½	½	½	7½	47.75	2770
4	Sergei Movsesian (Slovakia)	2751	0	0	½		½	½	½	1	½	½	1	½	1	1	7½	45.25	2770
5	Magnus Carlsen (Norway)	2776	½	½	½	½		1	½	½	0	1	½	½	½	½	7	45.50	2740
6	Leinier Domínguez (Cuba)	2717	0	1	½	½	0		½	½	½	½	½	1	½	1	7	43.75	2745
7	Gata Kamsky (United States)	2725	1	0	0	½	½	½		½	½	½	½	½	½	1	6½		2715
8	Loek van Wely (Netherlands)	2625	½	½	1	0	½	½	½		½	½	½	½	½	0	6	39.75	2694
9	Wang Yue (China)	2739	½	½	0	½	1	½	½	½		½	0	½	0	1	6	39.50	2685
10	Jan Smeets (Netherlands)	2601	½	½	½	½	0	½	½	½	½		1	½	½	0	6	39.00	2696
11	Vasyl Ivanchuk (Ukraine)	2779	1	½	0	0	½	½	½	½	1	0		½	½	0	5½	36.50	2654
12	Daniël Stellwagen (Netherlands)	2612	0	½	½	½	½	0	½	½	½	½	½		½	½	5½	35.25	2667
13	Michael Adams (England)	2712	0	0	½	0	½	½	½	½	1	½	½	½		½	5½	34.25	2659
14	Alexander Morozevich (Russia)	2771	0	½	½	0	½	0	0	1	0	1	1	½	½		5½	34.00	2655

71st Corus Chess Tournament, grandmaster group B, 17 January – 1 February 2009, Wijk aan Zee, Cat. XVI (2641)
	Player	Rating	1	2	3	4	5	6	7	8	9	10	11	12	13	14	Total	SB	TPR
1	GM Fabiano Caruana (Italy)	2646		1	½	½	½	0	0	1	½	½	1	1	1	1	8½		2751
2	GM Nigel Short (England)	2663	0		½	1	½	1	½	1	1	½	1	½	½	0	8	52.00	2727
3	GM Alexander Motylev (Russia)	2676	½	½		1	½	½	½	0	½	1	1	½	1	½	8	50.00	2726
4	GM Rustam Kasimdzhanov (Uzbekistan)	2687	½	0	0		½	1	½	½	½	1	1	1	½	1	8	47.25	2725
5	GM Andrei Volokitin (Ukraine)	2671	½	½	½	½		½	0	1	1	1	½	½	½	½	7½	47.50	2696
6	GM Francisco Vallejo Pons (Spain)	2702	1	0	½	0	½		½	0	1	0	1	1	1	1	7½	43.75	2694
7	GM Zahar Efimenko (Ukraine)	2688	1	½	½	½	1	½		0	0	½	0	1	½	1	7		2667
8	GM David Navara (Czech Republic)	2638	0	0	1	½	0	1	1		½	½	0	½	½	1	6½		2642
9	GM Dimitri Reinderman (Netherlands)	2549	½	0	½	½	0	0	1	½		1	½	½	½	½	6	37.50	2619
10	WGM Hou Yifan (China)	2571	½	½	0	0	0	1	½	½	0		½	1	½	1	6	35.75	2618
11	GM Erwin l'Ami (Netherlands)	2603	0	0	0	0	½	0	1	1	½	½		½	1	½	5½		2587
12	GM Henrique Mecking (Brazil)	2567	0	½	½	0	½	0	0	½	½	0	½		½	1	4½		2537
13	GM Jan Werle (Netherlands)	2607	0	½	0	½	½	0	½	½	½	½	0	½		0	4	26.75	2503
14	GM Krishnan Sasikiran (India)	2711	0	1	½	0	½	0	0	0	½	0	½	0	1		4	25.50	2495

71st Corus Chess Tournament, grandmaster group C, 17 January – 1 February 2009, Wijk aan Zee, Cat. XI (2521)
	Player	Rating	1	2	3	4	5	6	7	8	9	10	11	12	13	14	Total	SB	TPR
1	GM Wesley So (Philippines)	2627		1	½	½	½	0	½	1	1	1	1	1	1	½	9½		2688
2	GM Tiger Hillarp Persson (Sweden)	2586	0		1	0	1	1	½	0	½	1	½	1	1	1	8½	51.50	2626
3	FM Anish Giri (Russia)	2469	½	0		1	½	½	½	½	½	½	1	1	1	1	8½	51.00	2635
4	GM Abhijeet Gupta (India)	2569	½	1	0		1	1	0	0	0	1	0	1	1	1	7½	47.75	2574
5	GM David Howell (England)	2622	½	0	½	0		½	0	1	1	0	1	1	1	1	7½	43.75	2570
6	GM Frank Holzke (Germany)	2524	1	0	½	0	½		½	½	0	1	1	0	1	½	6½		2521
7	WGM Harika Dronavalli (India)	2473	½	½	½	1	1	½		½	0	½	½	½	0	0	6		2496
8	IM Ali Bitalzadeh (Netherlands)	2400	0	1	½	1	0	½	½		1	0	0	1	0	0	5½	37.50	2473
9	GM Friso Nijboer (Netherlands)	2560	0	½	½	1	0	1	1	0		0	1	0	0	½	5½	36.25	2461
10	IM Manuel Bosboom (Netherlands)	2418	0	0	½	0	1	0	½	1	1		0	1	0	½	5½	33.50	2472
11	IM Roeland Pruijssers (Netherlands)	2444	0	½	0	1	0	0	½	1	0	1		0	1	½	5½	33.00	2470
12	GM Eduardo Iturrizaga (Venezuela)	2528	0	0	0	0	0	1	½	0	1	0	1		1	1	5½	30.00	2464
13	GM Manuel León Hoyos (Mexico)	2542	0	0	0	0	0	0	1	1	1	1	0	0		1	5		2432
14	GM Oleg Romanishin (Ukraine)	2533	½	0	0	0	0	½	1	1	½	½	½	0	0		4½		2410
