= Corus Chess Tournament 2002 =

Chess tournament in the Netherlands

- Venue: Wijk aan Zee

The Corus Chess Tournament 2002 was the 64th edition of the Corus Chess Tournament. It was held in Wijk aan Zee in January 2002 and was won by Evgeny Bareev.

== 2002 ==
64th Corus Chess Tournament, group A, 11–27 January 2002, Wijk aan Zee, Cat. XVIII (2688)
| | Player | Rating | 1 | 2 | 3 | 4 | 5 | 6 | 7 | 8 | 9 | 10 | 11 | 12 | 13 | 14 | Total | TPR | Place |
|---|---|---|---|---|---|---|---|---|---|---|---|---|---|---|---|---|---|---|---|
| 1 | Evgeny Bareev (Russia) | 2707 | | ½ | ½ | ½ | 0 | 1 | 1 | ½ | ½ | 1 | 1 | ½ | 1 | 1 | 9 | 2827 | 1 |
| 2 | Alexander Grischuk (Russia) | 2671 | ½ | | 0 | 1 | 1 | 0 | ½ | ½ | 1 | ½ | 1 | ½ | 1 | 1 | 8½ | 2799 | 2 |
| 3 | Michael Adams (England) | 2742 | ½ | 1 | | ½ | ½ | ½ | ½ | 1 | ½ | ½ | ½ | 1 | ½ | ½ | 8 | 2770 | 3–4 |
| 4 | Alexander Morozevich (Russia) | 2742 | ½ | 0 | ½ | | ½ | ½ | ½ | ½ | 1 | 1 | ½ | ½ | 1 | 1 | 8 | 2770 | 3–4 |
| 5 | Alexander Khalifman (Russia) | 2688 | 1 | 0 | ½ | ½ | | ½ | ½ | ½ | ½ | ½ | ½ | ½ | 1 | 1 | 7½ | 2745 | 5 |
| 6 | Peter Leko (Hungary) | 2713 | 0 | 1 | ½ | ½ | ½ | | ½ | ½ | ½ | ½ | ½ | ½ | ½ | 1 | 7 | 2715 | 6 |
| 7 | Alexey Dreev (Russia) | 2683 | 0 | ½ | ½ | ½ | ½ | ½ | | ½ | 1 | ½ | ½ | ½ | 0 | ½ | 6 | 2659 | 7–11 |
| 8 | Boris Gelfand (Israel) | 2703 | ½ | ½ | 0 | ½ | ½ | ½ | ½ | | 0 | 1 | 0 | 1 | ½ | ½ | 6 | 2657 | 7–11 |
| 9 | Jeroen Piket (Netherlands) | 2659 | ½ | 0 | ½ | 0 | ½ | ½ | 0 | 1 | | ½ | ½ | 1 | ½ | ½ | 6 | 2661 | 7–11 |
| 10 | Joël Lautier (France) | 2687 | 0 | ½ | ½ | 0 | ½ | ½ | ½ | 0 | ½ | | 1 | ½ | 1 | ½ | 6 | 2659 | 7–11 |
| 11 | Jan Timman (Netherlands) | 2605 | 0 | 0 | ½ | ½ | ½ | ½ | ½ | 1 | ½ | 0 | | ½ | ½ | 1 | 6 | 2665 | 7–11 |
| 12 | Mikhail Gurevich (Belgium) | 2641 | ½ | ½ | 0 | ½ | ½ | ½ | ½ | 0 | 0 | ½ | ½ | | 1 | ½ | 5½ | 2634 | 12 |
| 13 | Rustam Kasimdzhanov (Uzbekistan) | 2695 | 0 | 0 | ½ | 0 | 0 | ½ | 1 | ½ | ½ | 0 | ½ | 0 | | 1 | 4½ | 2577 | 13 |
| 14 | Loek van Wely (Netherlands) | 2697 | 0 | 0 | ½ | 0 | 0 | 0 | ½ | ½ | ½ | ½ | 0 | ½ | 0 | | 3 | 2476 | 14 |

64th Corus Chess Tournament, group B, January 2002, Wijk aan Zee, Cat. XII (2530)
| | Player | Rating | 1 | 2 | 3 | 4 | 5 | 6 | 7 | 8 | 9 | 10 | 11 | 12 | Total | TPR | Place |
|---|---|---|---|---|---|---|---|---|---|---|---|---|---|---|---|---|---|
| 1 | GM Michał Krasenkow (Poland) | 2632 | | ½ | ½ | ½ | ½ | ½ | 1 | ½ | 1 | 1 | 1 | 1 | 8 | 2695 | 1 |
| 2 | GM Friso Nijboer (Netherlands) | 2574 | ½ | | ½ | ½ | ½ | 1 | ½ | 1 | ½ | 0 | 1 | 1 | 7 | 2628 | 2–3 |
| 3 | GM Ivan Sokolov (Bosnia and Herzegovina) | 2659 | ½ | ½ | | 0 | ½ | ½ | ½ | ½ | 1 | 1 | 1 | 1 | 7 | 2620 | 2–3 |
| 4 | GM Pavel Tregubov (Russia) | 2626 | ½ | ½ | 1 | | 1 | 0 | 0 | 0 | 1 | 1 | ½ | 1 | 6½ | 2586 | 4 |
| 5 | GM John van der Wiel (Netherlands) | 2501 | ½ | ½ | ½ | 0 | | 1 | ½ | ½ | ½ | 1 | ½ | ½ | 6 | 2568 | 5–6 |
| 6 | IM Harmen Jonkman (Netherlands) | 2498 | ½ | 0 | ½ | 1 | 0 | | ½ | ½ | ½ | 1 | ½ | 1 | 6 | 2568 | 5–6 |
| 7 | IM Antoaneta Stefanova (Bulgaria) | 2451 | 0 | ½ | ½ | 1 | ½ | ½ | | 1 | 0 | ½ | ½ | ½ | 5½ | 2537 | 7–8 |
| 8 | IM Yu Shaoteng (China) | 2522 | ½ | 0 | ½ | 1 | ½ | ½ | 0 | | 1 | ½ | ½ | ½ | 5½ | 2530 | 7–8 |
| 9 | IM Frans Cuijpers (Netherlands) | 2458 | 0 | ½ | 0 | 0 | ½ | ½ | 1 | 0 | | ½ | 1 | 0 | 4 | 2434 | 9–10 |
| 10 | IM Peng Zhaoqin (Netherlands) | 2460 | 0 | 1 | 0 | 0 | 0 | 0 | ½ | ½ | ½ | | 1 | ½ | 4 | 2434 | 9–10 |
| 11 | WGM Almira Skripchenko-Lautier (France) | 2498 | 0 | 0 | 0 | ½ | ½ | ½ | ½ | ½ | 0 | 0 | | 1 | 3½ | 2399 | 11 |
| 12 | IM Jan Werle (Netherlands) | 2481 | 0 | 0 | 0 | 0 | ½ | 0 | ½ | ½ | 1 | ½ | 0 | | 3 | 2359 | 12 |

64th Corus Chess Tournament, group C, 18–27 January 2002, Wijk aan Zee, Cat. VIII (2447)
| | Player | Rating | 1 | 2 | 3 | 4 | 5 | 6 | 7 | 8 | 9 | 10 | Total | TPR | Place |
|---|---|---|---|---|---|---|---|---|---|---|---|---|---|---|---|
| 1 | GM Ian Rogers (Australia) | 2555 | | ½ | ½ | 1 | 1 | ½ | ½ | ½ | 1 | 1 | 6½ | 2601 | 1–2 |
| 2 | GM Andrei Istrățescu (Romania) | 2605 | ½ | | ½ | 1 | ½ | ½ | ½ | 1 | 1 | 1 | 6½ | 2595 | 1–2 |
| 3 | GM Viorel Iordăchescu (Moldova) | 2558 | ½ | ½ | | ½ | 1 | 1 | ½ | ½ | 1 | ½ | 6 | 2559 | 3 |
| 4 | IM Ketevan Arakhamia-Grant (Georgia) | 2410 | 0 | 0 | ½ | | ½ | ½ | 1 | 1 | 1 | 1 | 5½ | 2531 | 4 |
| 5 | IM Joost Berkvens (Netherlands) | 2461 | 0 | ½ | 0 | ½ | | 0 | 1 | 1 | 1 | 1 | 5 | 2488 | 5 |
| 6 | FM Stefan van Blitterswijk (Netherlands) | 2384 | ½ | ½ | 0 | ½ | 1 | | ½ | 0 | 1 | ½ | 4½ | 2454 | 6–7 |
| 7 | Jan Smeets (Netherlands) | 2327 | ½ | ½ | ½ | 0 | 0 | ½ | | 1 | 1 | ½ | 4½ | 2460 | 6–7 |
| 8 | FM Daniël Stellwagen (Netherlands) | 2377 | ½ | 0 | ½ | 0 | 0 | 1 | 0 | | 0 | 1 | 3 | 2329 | 8 |
| 9 | Ron Nep (Netherlands) | 2362 | 0 | 0 | 0 | 0 | 0 | 0 | 0 | 1 | | 1 | 2 | 2236 | 9 |
| 10 | WGM Masha Klinova (Israel) | 2432 | 0 | 0 | ½ | 0 | 0 | ½ | ½ | 0 | 0 | | 1½ | 2175 | 10 |
