= 2002 in chess =

Events in chess during the year 2002:

- The Manhattan Chess Club closes. Founded in 1877, it was the second oldest chess club in the United States.

== Top players ==
FIDE top 10 players by Elo rating - October 2002;

1. Garry Kasparov Russia 2836
2. Vladimir Kramnik Russia 2809
3. Viswanathan Anand India 2755
4. Michael Adams England 2745
5. Veselin Topalov Bulgaria 2743
6. Peter Leko Hungary 2743
7. Ruslan Ponomariov Ukraine 2743
8. Evgeny Bareev Russia 2737
9. Alexander Morozevich Russia 2742
10. Vassily Ivanchuk Ukraine 2709

== Tournaments ==
Tournament	City	System	Dates	Players (2700+)	Winner	Runner-up
Corus Chess Tournament	(Netherlands) Wijk aan Zee	Round robin	11–27 Jan	14 (5)	(Russia) Evgeny Bareev	(Russia) Alexander Grischuk
Corus Chess Tournament Group B	(Netherlands) Wijk aan Zee	Round robin	11–27 Jan	14 (0)	(Poland) Michał Krasenkow	(Netherlands) Friso Nijboer (Bosnia and Herzegovina) Ivan Sokolov
FIDE World Cup	(Russia) Moscow	Knockout	9 – 22 Oct	24 (3)	(India) Viswanathan Anand	(Kazakhstan) Rustam Kasimdzhanov
FIDE World Chess Championship	(Russia) Moscow	Knockout	27 Nov 2001 – 23 Jan	128 (11)	(Ukraine) Ruslan Ponomariov	(Ukraine) Vasyl Ivanchuk

== Deaths ==
- Ricardo Calvo, a Spanish chess International Master - September 26
- Eduard Gufeld, a Ukrainian International Grandmaster and chess author - September 23
- Edmar Mednis, an American International Grandmaster and chess writer - February 13
