= Hoogovens Wijk aan Zee Chess Tournament 1999 =

Chess tournament

Position: a8 black bishop, d8 black rook, h8 black rook, a7 black king, f7 black pawn, h7 black pawn, a6 black pawn, d6 black queen, f6 black knight, g6 black pawn, a5 white knight, b5 black pawn, c5 black pawn, d5 white pawn, d4 black pawn, f4 white queen, a3 white pawn, f3 white pawn, g3 white pawn, h3 white bishop, b2 white pawn, c2 white pawn, h2 white pawn, b1 white king, d1 white rook, e1 white rook
The position after move 24 in the Kasparov - Topalov game. Kasparov played Rxd4!!
- Venue: Wijk aan Zee

The Hoogovens Wijk aan Zee Steel Chess Tournament 1999 was the 61st edition of the Hoogovens Wijk aan Zee Chess Tournament. It was held in Wijk aan Zee in January 1999 and was won by world number one Garry Kasparov.

Kasparov, entering for the first time, finished half a point ahead of 1998 champion Viswanathan Anand, and whose final tally of 10 points included a seven-game winning streak, described the event as "by far the best tournament in my life" and stated that his preparation was the strongest it had ever been due to computers. The game Kasparov played against Veselin Topalov is one of Kasparov's most famous games, and is called "Kasparov's Immortal"; it is considered a masterpiece and some even consider it the best Chess game ever played.

61st Hoogovens tournament, group A, 15–31 January 1999, Wijk aan Zee, Netherlands, Category XVIII (2678)
	Player	Rating	1	2	3	4	5	6	7	8	9	10	11	12	13	14	Total	TPR	Place
1	Garry Kasparov (Russia)	2812		½	½	0	1	1	½	½	1	1	1	1	1	1	10	2878	1
2	Viswanathan Anand (India)	2781	½		½	½	1	½	1	½	½	1	1	1	½	1	9½	2844	2
3	Vladimir Kramnik (Russia)	2751	½	½		½	½	1	1	½	½	½	½	½	1	½	8	2758	3
4	Ivan Sokolov (Bosnia and Herzegovina)	2624	1	½	½		½	0	½	0	½	½	½	1	1	½	7	2710	4–7
5	Jeroen Piket (Netherlands)	2619	0	0	½	½		½	1	1	½	1	½	½	½	½	7	2711	4–7
6	Alexei Shirov (Spain)	2726	0	½	0	1	½		½	½	½	½	½	½	1	1	7	2702	4–7
7	Jan Timman (Netherlands)	2670	½	0	0	½	0	½		1	½	0	1	1	1	1	7	2707	4–7
8	Vasyl Ivanchuk (Ukraine)	2714	½	½	½	1	0	½	0		½	½	½	½	½	1	6½	2674	8–9
9	Peter Svidler (Russia)	2713	0	½	½	½	½	½	½	½		½	1	½	½	½	6½	2674	8–9
10	Veselin Topalov (Bulgaria)	2700	0	0	½	½	0	½	1	½	½		½	1	0	1	6	2646	10
11	Rustam Kasimdzhanov (Uzbekistan)	2606	0	0	½	½	½	½	0	½	0	½		1	½	½	5	2596	11
12	Loek van Wely (Netherlands)	2632	0	0	½	0	½	½	0	½	½	0	0		1	1	4½	2571	12
13	Alex Yermolinsky (United States)	2597	0	½	0	0	½	0	0	½	½	1	½	0		½	4	2542	13
14	Dimitri Reinderman (Netherlands)	2541	0	0	½	½	½	0	0	0	½	0	½	0	½		3	2477	14

61st Hoogovens tournament, group B, 19–31 January 1999, Wijk aan Zee, Netherlands, Category XI (2520)
	Player	Rating	1	2	3	4	5	6	7	8	9	10	11	12	Total	TPR	Place
1	GM Smbat Lputian (Armenia)	2614		½	½	½	½	1	1	½	1	1	1	1	8½	2722	1
2	GM Rafael Leitão (Brazil)	2545	½		½	½	½	1	1	½	½	½	1	1	7½	2650	2
3	GM Sergey Ionov (Russia)	2551	½	½		½	1	½	1	½	½	1	½	½	7	2618	3–4
4	GM John van der Wiel (Netherlands)	2529	½	½	½		0	1	1	1	½	½	½	1	7	2620	3–4
5	GM Igor Glek (Russia)	2566	½	½	0	1		½	0	½	½	1	1	1	6½	2580	5–6
6	GM Friso Nijboer (Netherlands)	2534	0	0	½	0	½		1	1	1	1	1	½	6½	2583	5–6
7	Dennis de Vreugt (Netherlands)	2378	0	0	0	0	1	0		1	1	½	1	½	5	2496	7
8	GM Michail Brodsky (Ukraine)	2530	½	½	½	0	½	0	0		½	½	½	1	4½	2453	8
9	GM Christian Bauer (France)	2528	0	½	½	½	½	0	0	½		0	½	1	4	2417	9–10
10	Ruud Janssen (Netherlands)	2445	0	½	0	½	0	0	½	½	1		½	½	4	2424	9–10
11	IM Jeroen Bosch (Netherlands)	2470	0	0	½	½	0	0	0	½	½	½		½	3	2349	11
12	IM Erik van den Doel (Netherlands)	2547	0	0	½	0	0	½	½	0	0	½	½		2½	2306	12
