= Ruud Janssen (chess player) =

Dutch chess grandmaster (born 1979)

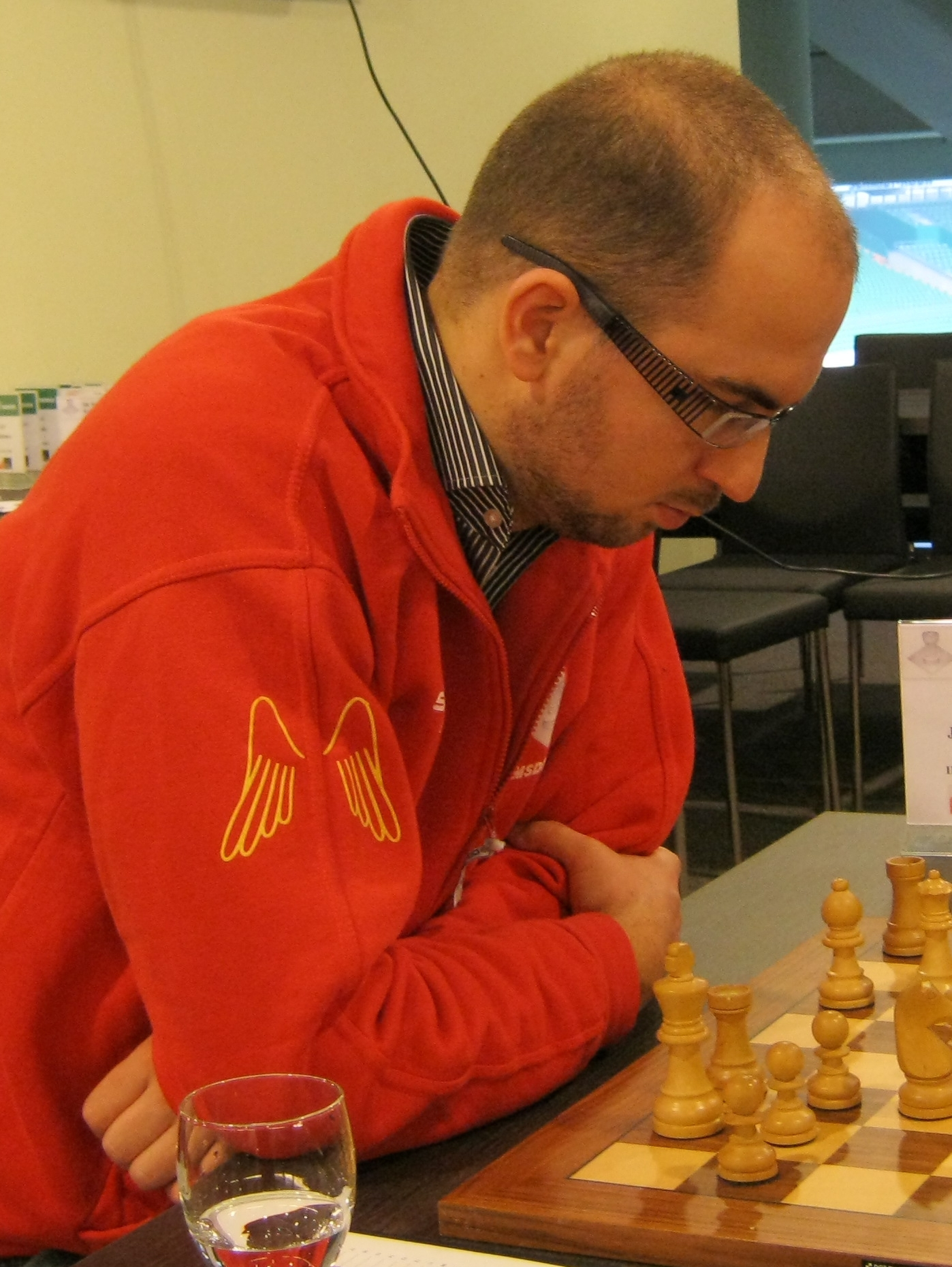
- Janssen in 2012

Personal information
- Born: May 1, 1979 (age 47) Venray, Netherlands

Chess career
- Country: Netherlands
- Title: Grandmaster (2011)
- FIDE rating: 2462 (July 2026)
- Peak rating: 2536 (January 2020)

Ruud Janssen is a Dutch chess grandmaster.

== Chess career ==
In January 1999, he competed in Group B of the Hoogovens Wijk aan Zee Chess Tournament 1999, where he defeated grandmaster Christian Bauer and held draws against grandmasters Rafael Leitão, John van der Wiel, and Michail Brodsky.

In January 2003, he finished in second place in the invitation tens group of the Corus Chess Tournament 2003. He defeated grandmaster Eric Lobron and held grandmaster Bu Xiangzhi to a draw.

In January 2004, he competed in Group C of the Corus Chess Tournament 2004, where he held future world champion Magnus Carlsen to a draw and defeated grandmaster Merab Gagunashvili.

In October 2021, he competed in the Dutch Chess Championship, but was knocked out by Hing Ting Lai.
