= Hoogovens Wijk aan Zee Chess Tournament 1998 =

Chess tournament

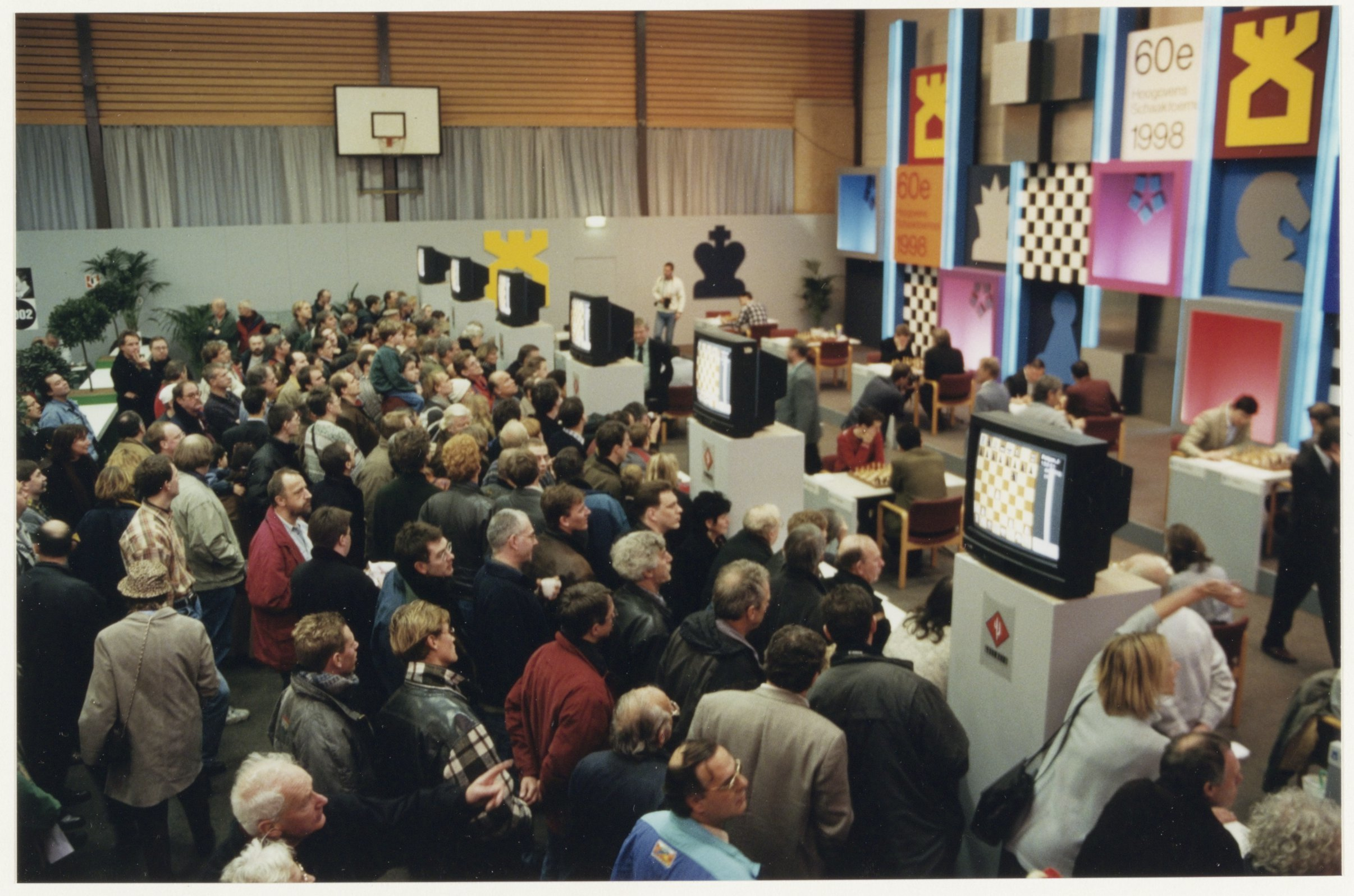
- Public watching the 60th Wijk aan Zee tournament.
- Venue: Wijk aan Zee

The Hoogovens Wijk aan Zee Steel Chess Tournament 1998 was the 60th edition of the Hoogovens Wijk aan Zee Chess Tournament. It was held in Wijk aan Zee in January 1998 and was won jointly won by Vladimir Kramnik and Viswanathan Anand.

60th Hoogovens tournament, group A, 16 January – 1 February 1998, Wijk aan Zee, Cat. XVII (2671)
	Player	Rating	1	2	3	4	5	6	7	8	9	10	11	12	13	14	Total	TPR	Place
1	Vladimir Kramnik (Russia)	2790		½	0	½	1	½	1	1	1	½	½	1	0	1	8½	2771	1–2
2	Viswanathan Anand (India)	2770	½		½	½	½	½	0	½	½	1	1	1	1	1	8½	2773	1–2
3	Alexei Shirov (Spain)	2710	1	½		1	1	½	0	½	1	½	0	½	½	½	7½	2724	3–5
4	Jan Timman (Netherlands)	2635	½	½	0		1	½	½	½	½	½	1	½	½	1	7½	2730	3–5
5	Michael Adams (England)	2670	0	½	0	0		½	½	½	½	1	1	1	1	1	7½	2727	3–5
6	Anatoly Karpov (Russia)	2735	½	½	½	½	½		1	½	½	0	0	½	½	1	6½	2665	6–10
7	Judit Polgár (Hungary)	2670	0	1	1	½	½	0		0	½	½	½	½	½	1	6½	2670	6–10
8	Boris Gelfand (Belarus)	2675	0	½	½	½	½	½	1		½	½	0	1	½	½	6½	2670	6–10
9	Jeroen Piket (Netherlands)	2575	0	½	0	½	½	½	½	½		1	½	0	1	1	6½	2678	6–10
10	Veselin Topalov (Bulgaria)	2740	½	0	½	½	0	1	½	½	0		1	½	1	½	6½	2665	6–10
11	Valery Salov (Russia)	2680	½	0	1	0	0	1	½	1	½	0		½	½	0	5½	2613	11
12	Friso Nijboer (Netherlands)	2580	0	0	½	½	0	½	½	0	1	½	½		½	½	5	2590	12
13	Loek van Wely (Netherlands)	2605	1	0	½	½	0	½	½	½	0	0	½	½		0	4½	2565	13
14	Paul van der Sterren (Netherlands)	2555	0	0	½	0	0	0	0	½	0	½	1	½	1		4	2538	14

60th Hoogovens tournament, group B, 20–31 January 1998, Wijk aan Zee, Netherlands, Category XI (2501)
	Player	Rating	1	2	3	4	5	6	7	8	9	10	11	12	Total	TPR	Place
1	IM Dimitri Reinderman (Netherlands)	2480		1	1	1	1	1	1	½	1	½	½	½	9	2764	1–2
2	IM Rustam Kasimdzhanov (Uzbekistan)	2565	0		½	1	½	1	1	1	1	1	1	1	9	2757	1–2
3	GM Tal Shaked (United States)	2535	0	½		0	½	½	1	½	0	1	1	1	6	2533	3–5
4	GM Mikhail Kobalia (Russia)	2500	0	0	1		½	½	0	1	1	½	1	½	6	2536	3–5
5	GM John van der Wiel (Netherlands)	2525	0	½	½	½		½	0	½	½	1	1	1	6	2534	3–5
6	GM Xie Jun (China)	2485	0	0	½	½	½		½	1	½	1	1	0	5½	2502	6–7
7	IM Erik van den Doel (Netherlands)	2485	0	0	0	1	1	½		½	½	0	1	1	5½	2502	6–7
8	GM Boris Alterman (Israel)	2615	½	0	½	0	½	0	½		1	0	1	1	5	2454	8
9	IM Marinus Kuijf (Netherlands)	2460	0	0	1	0	½	½	½	0		1	0	1	4½	2439	9
10	IM Albert Blees (Netherlands)	2445	½	0	0	½	0	0	1	1	0		½	½	4	2403	10
11	IM Manuel Bosboom (Netherlands)	2450	½	0	0	0	0	0	0	0	1	½		1	3	2330	11
12	IM Alexander Cherniaev (Russia)	2465	½	0	0	½	0	1	0	0	0	½	0		2½	2293	12
