= Frank Holzke =

German chess grandmaster (born 1971)

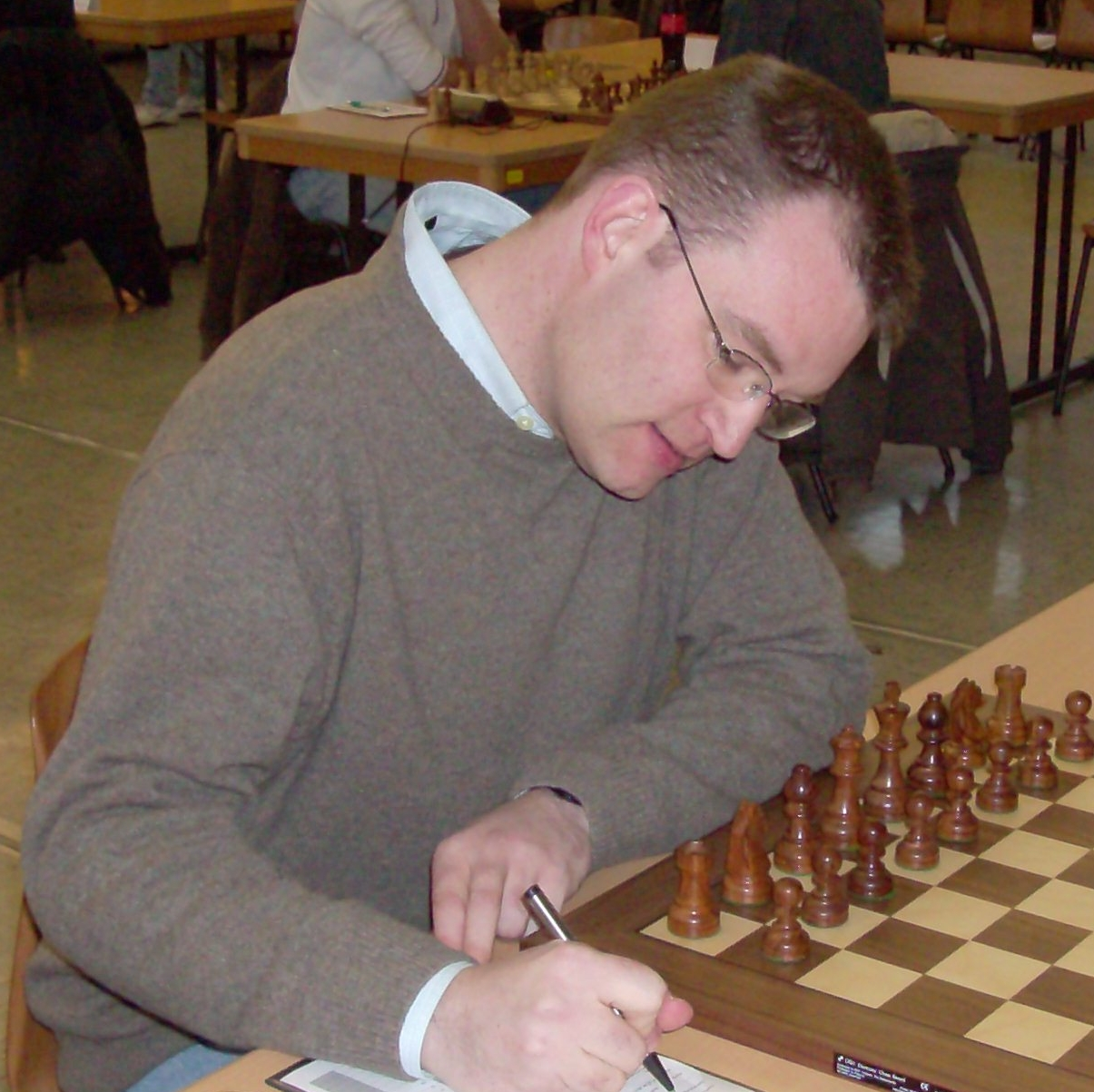
- Holzke in 2008

Personal information
- Born: July 8, 1971 (age 55) Cologne, Germany

Chess career
- Country: Germany
- Title: Grandmaster (2008)
- FIDE rating: 2410 (July 2026)
- Peak rating: 2526 (July 2009)

Frank Holzke (born July 8, 1971) is a German chess grandmaster.

== Chess career ==
In 1998, Holzke was joint winner of the Wichern Open alongside Daniel Fridman.

In 2009, Holzke played in Group C of the Tata Steel Chess Tournament, where he finished 6th and defeated Wesley So, Manuel Bosboom, Roeland Pruijssers, and Manuel León Hoyos.

In November 2022, Holzke was leading the World Senior Chess Championship after the fifth round alongside Rogelio Antonio Jr., Darcy Lima, and Maxim Novik. He finished the tournament in 8th place.

== Publications ==
Holzke has also written a book on chess strategy.
