= Iozefina Păuleț =

Romanian-Dutch chess player (born 1989)

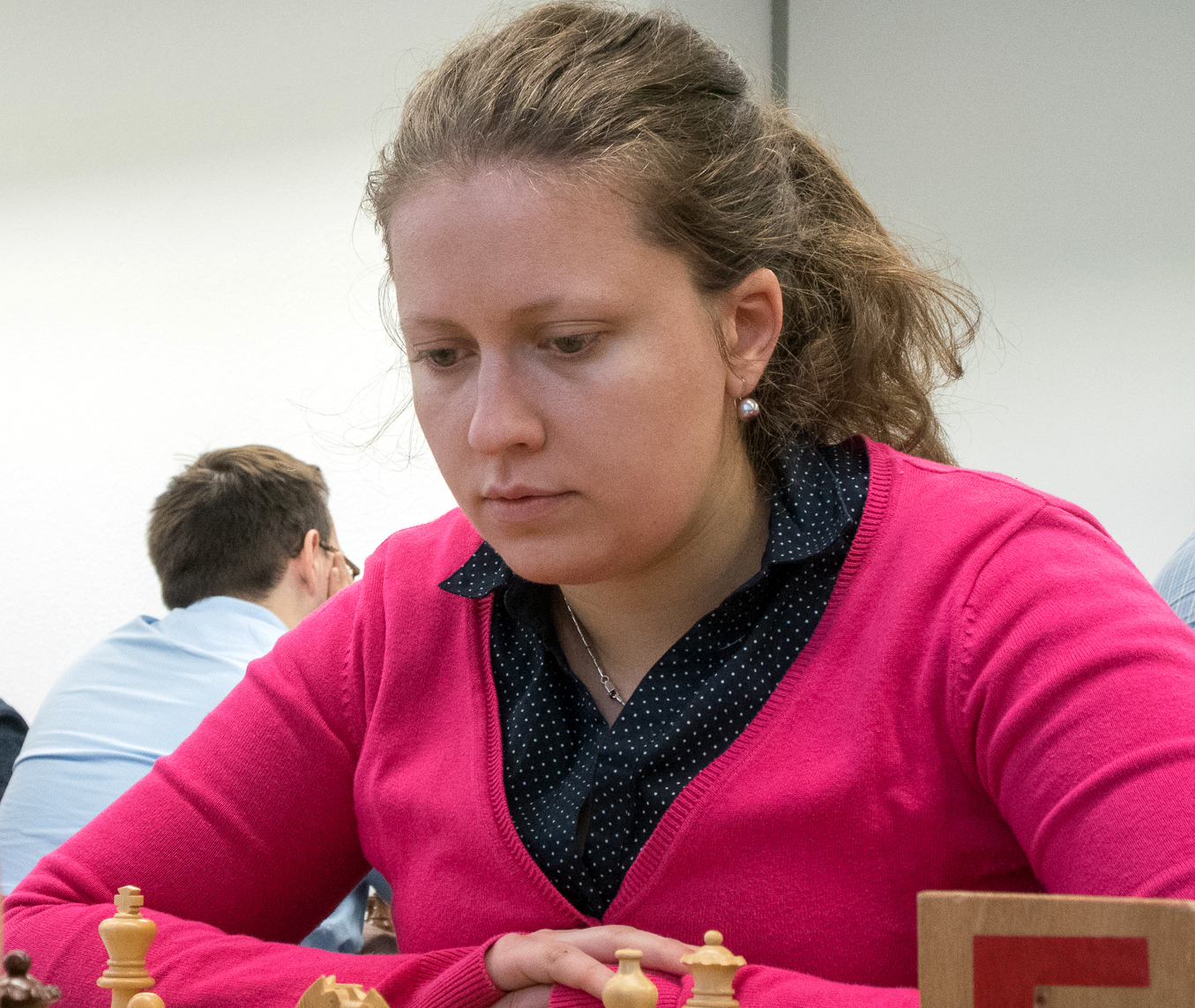
- Iozefina Păuleț in 2017

Personal information
- Born: 19 February 1989 (age 37) Iași, Romania
- Spouse: Jan Werle (m. 2019)

Chess career
- Country: Romania (until 2012); Netherlands (since 2012)
- Title: Woman Grandmaster (2009)
- FIDE rating: 2312 (December 2021)
- Peak rating: 2342 (September 2009)

Iozefina Werle (née Păuleț, born 19 February 1989) is a Romanian-Dutch chess player (since 2012) who holds the FIDE title of Woman Grandmaster (WGM, 2009).

== Biography ==
Păuleț repeatedly represented Romania at the European Youth Chess Championships and World Youth Chess Championships in different age groups, where she won two medals: gold (in 2002, at the European Youth Chess Championship in the U12 girls age group) and silver (in 2006, at the European Youth Chess Championship in the U18 girls age group). In 2002, she won European Youth Fast Chess Championship in the U14 girls age group. Păuleț three times participated in the European Girls' U18 Team Chess Championships (2004-2007), where she won gold (2007) and silver (2006) medals in team scoring, as well as bronze (2007) medal in individual scoring.

She is a three-time winner of medals in the Romanian Women's Chess Championship: two silver (2008, 2010) and bronze (2009).

Păuleț played for Romania in the Women's Chess Olympiad:

- In 2008, at fourth board in the 38th Chess Olympiad (women) in Dresden (+5, =3, -1).

She played for Romania and Netherlands in the European Team Chess Championships:

- In 2007, at fourth board in the 7th European Team Chess Championship (women) in Heraklion (+6, =1, -2),
- In 2017, at fourth board in the 12th European Team Chess Championship (women) in Crete (+3, =2, -3).

In 2005, Păuleț was awarded the FIDE Woman International Master (WIM) title and received the FIDE Woman Grandmaster (WGM) title four years later.

She currently lives in the Netherlands and married Dutch chess Grandmaster Jan Werle on 7 September 2019.
