= Hogeschool Zeeland Tournament =

Chess event in Vlissingen, Netherlands

The Hogeschool Zeeland Tournament (or HZ Tournament) is an annual international chess tournament which takes place in Vlissingen, Netherlands. The first two editions, held in 1995 and 1996, were known as Zeeland Open. It is hosted by the HZ University of Applied Sciences.

== List of winners ==
=== Zeeland Open ===
Year	Winner
1995	Alexei Barsov (Uzbekistan)
1996	Artur Kogan (Israel)

=== HZ Tournament ===
#	Year	Winner
1	1997	Igor Glek (Russia)
2	1998	Mikhail Gurevich (Belgium)
3	1999	Alberto David (Luxembourg)
4	2000	Ivan Sokolov (Bosnia)
5	2001	Jeroen Piket (Netherlands)
6	2002	Friso Nijboer (Netherlands)
7	2003	Rustam Kasimdzhanov (Uzbekistan)
8	2004	Krishnan Sasikiran (India)
9	2005	Friso Nijboer (Netherlands)
10	2006	Michał Krasenkow (Poland)
11	2007	Fabiano Caruana (Italy)
12	2008	Lazaro Bruzon (Cuba)
13	2009	Michał Krasenkow (Poland)
14	2010	Krishnan Sasikiran (India)
15	2011	Konstantin Landa (Russia)
16	2012	Dimitri Reinderman (Netherlands)
17	2013	Michał Krasenkow (Poland)
18	2014	Michał Krasenkow (Poland)
19	2015	Baadur Jobava (Georgia)
20	2016	Loek Van Wely (Netherlands)
21	2017	Eduardo Iturrizaga (Venezuela)
22	2018	Sandro Mareco (Argentina)
