= Chess World Cup 2002 =

Chess tournament in Hyderabad, India

Second Chess World Cup
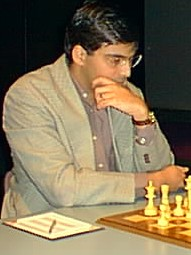
- Viswanathan Anand

Tournament information
- Sport: Chess
- Location: Hyderabad, India
- Dates: 9 October 2002–22 October 2002
- Administrator: FIDE
- Tournament format: Multi-stage tournament
- Host: All India Chess Federation
- Venue: Ramoji Film City
- Purse: $180,000

Final positions
- Champion: (India) Viswanathan Anand
- Runner-up: (Uzbekistan) Rustam Kasimdzhanov

The FIDE World Cup 2002, marketed as the Second Chess World Cup, was a 24-player Category XVI chess tournament played between 9 October and 22 October 2002 in Hyderabad, India. The tournament was hosted at Ramoji Film City and organized by FIDE in conjunction with the All India Chess Federation. Former World Cup winner Viswanathan Anand defeated Rustam Kasimdzhanov in the final to retain the title.

== Format ==
The tournament began with a league stage, consisting of 4 groups of six players each. Each player played a game against each of the other players in his group once. At the end of the group stage, the top two players from each group progressed to the quarterfinals. In the knockout rounds, each player played a two-game match against his opponent. If the match was tied after the regular games, blitz tie-breaks were used to determine a winner.

== Participants ==
All players are Grandmasters unless indicated otherwise.

1. Viswanathan Anand (IND), 2755
2. Vassily Ivanchuk (UKR), 2709
3. Alexander Morozevich (RUS), 2707
4. Nigel Short (ENG), 2684
5. Alexey Dreev (RUS), 2673
6. Vladimir Malakhov (RUS), 2670
7. Krishnan Sasikiran (IND), 2670
8. Ye Jiangchuan (CHN), 2667
9. Zurab Azmaiparashvili (GEO), 2666
10. Sergei Rublevsky (RUS), 2664
11. Rustam Kasimdzhanov (UZB), 2653
12. Alexander Beliavsky (SLO), 2650
13. Xu Jun (CHN), 2643
14. Teimour Radjabov (AZE), 2628
15. Bartłomiej Macieja (POL), 2615
16. Giovanni Vescovi (BRA), 2614
17. Jaan Ehlvest (EST), 2600
18. Hichem Hamdouchi (MAR), 2593
19. Alex Yermolinsky (USA), 2575
20. Pentala Harikrishna (IND), 2551
21. Mohammed Al-Modiahki (QAT), 2550
22. Surya Ganguly (IND), 2531, IM
23. Saidali Iuldachev (UZB), 2511
24. Watu Kobese (RSA), 2399, IM

== Calendar ==
Round	Dates
Group Stage	5–13 October
Quarterfinals	15–16 October
Semifinals	17–18 October
Final	19–20 October

== Group stage ==
The group stages featured a number of surprising upsets, with the top three seeds all struggling to remain in contention. Anand, the No. 1 seed, overcame an early loss to Krishnan Sasikaran with wins over Kasimdzhanov and Al-Modiahki to finish second in his group. Vassily Ivanchuk was less fortunate, dropping games to Malakhov and Macieja and finishing fifth in Group A. Morozevich never recovered after suffering a disastrous start with three straight losses to Ehlvest, Ganguly, and Harikrishna. He scored only one point in five matches, finishing second-to-last in the entire tournament and dropping below 2700 in Elo rating for the first time since 1998.

=== Group A ===
	Player	Rating	1	2	3	4	5	6	Points	H2H	Koya
1	Vladimir Malakhov (RUS)	2670		1	½	0	1	1	3½		
2	Ye Jiangchuan (CHN)	2667	0		½	1	½	1	3	1½	
3	Bartłomiej Macieja (POL)	2615	½	½		½	1	½	3	1	
4	Giovanni Vescovi (BRA)	2614	1	0	½		½	1	3	½	
5	Vassily Ivanchuk (UKR)	2709	0	½	0	½		1	2		
6	Saidali Iuldachev (UZB)	2511	0	0	½	0	0		½		

=== Group B ===
	Player	Rating	1	2	3	4	5	6	Points	H2H	Koya
1	GM Alexey Dreev (RUS)	2673		½	1	½	1	½	3½		
2	GM Sergei Rublevsky (RUS)	2664	½		½	1	½	½	3	½	2
3	GM Teimour Radjabov (AZE)	2628	0	½		½	1	1	3	½	1
4	GM Zurab Azmaiparashvili (GEO)	2666	½	0	½		1	½	2½		
5	IM Watu Kobese (RSA)	2399	0	½	0	0		1	1½	1	
6	GM Alex Yermolinsky (USA)	2575	½	½	0	½	0		1½	0	

=== Group C ===
	Player	Rating	1	2	3	4	5	6	Points	H2H	Koya
1	Rustam Kasimdzhanov (UZB)	2653		0	1	½	1	1	3½		
2	Viswanathan Anand (IND)	2755	1		0	½	1	½	3		
3	Krishnan Sasikiran (IND)	2670	0	1		½	1	0	2½	½	2½
4	Hichem Hamdouchi (MAR)	2593	½	½	½		0	1	2½	½	1½
5	Mohamad Al-Modiahki (QAT)	2550	0	0	0	1		1	2		
6	Xu Jun (CHN)	2643	0	½	1	0	0		1½		

=== Group D ===
	Player	Rating	1	2	3	4	5	6	Points	H2H	Koya
1	Alexander Beliavsky (SLO)	2650		½	½	1	1	½	3½	1	2
2	Nigel Short (ENG)	2684	½		½	1	1	½	3½	1	2
3	Jaan Ehlvest (EST)	2600	½	½		½	1	1	3½	1	1½
4	Surya Ganguly (IND)	2531	0	0	½		½	1	2		
5	Pentala Harikrishna (IND)	2551	0	0	0	½		1	1½		
6	Alexander Morozevich (RUS)	2707	½	½	0	0	0		1		

== Playoffs ==
Quarterfinals
D1	(Slovenia) Alexander Beliavsky	1½
B2	(Russia) Sergei Rublevsky	½
A2	(China) Ye Jiangchuan	½
C1	(Uzbekistan) Rustam Kasimdzhanov	1½
D2	(England) Nigel Short	1½
B1	(Russia) Alexey Dreev	2½
A1	(Russia) Vladimir Malakhov	½
C2	(India) Viswanathan Anand	1½

Semifinals
(Slovenia) Alexander Beliavsky	½
(Uzbekistan) Rustam Kasimdzhanov	1½
(Russia) Alexey Dreev	2½
(India) Viswanathan Anand	3½

Final
(Uzbekistan) Rustam Kasimdzhanov	½
(India) Viswanathan Anand	1½

=== Final ===
In the final, Viswanathan Anand defended his World Cup title won in Shenyang against Rustam Kasimdzhanov in a two-game match. The first game of the match ended in a 16-move draw, with Kasimdzhanov failing to make any headway against Anand's Caro-Kann defence. In Game 2, Anand gradually outplayed Kasimdzhanov in the Petroff defence, gaining a strong advantage after 18 ... N6g5?. Kasimdzhanov would resign 11 moves later.

Name	Rating	1	2	Total
Viswanathan Anand (IND)	2755	½	1	1½
Rustam Kasimdzhanov (UZB)	2653	½	0	½
