= Manuel Bosboom =

Dutch chess player (born 1963)

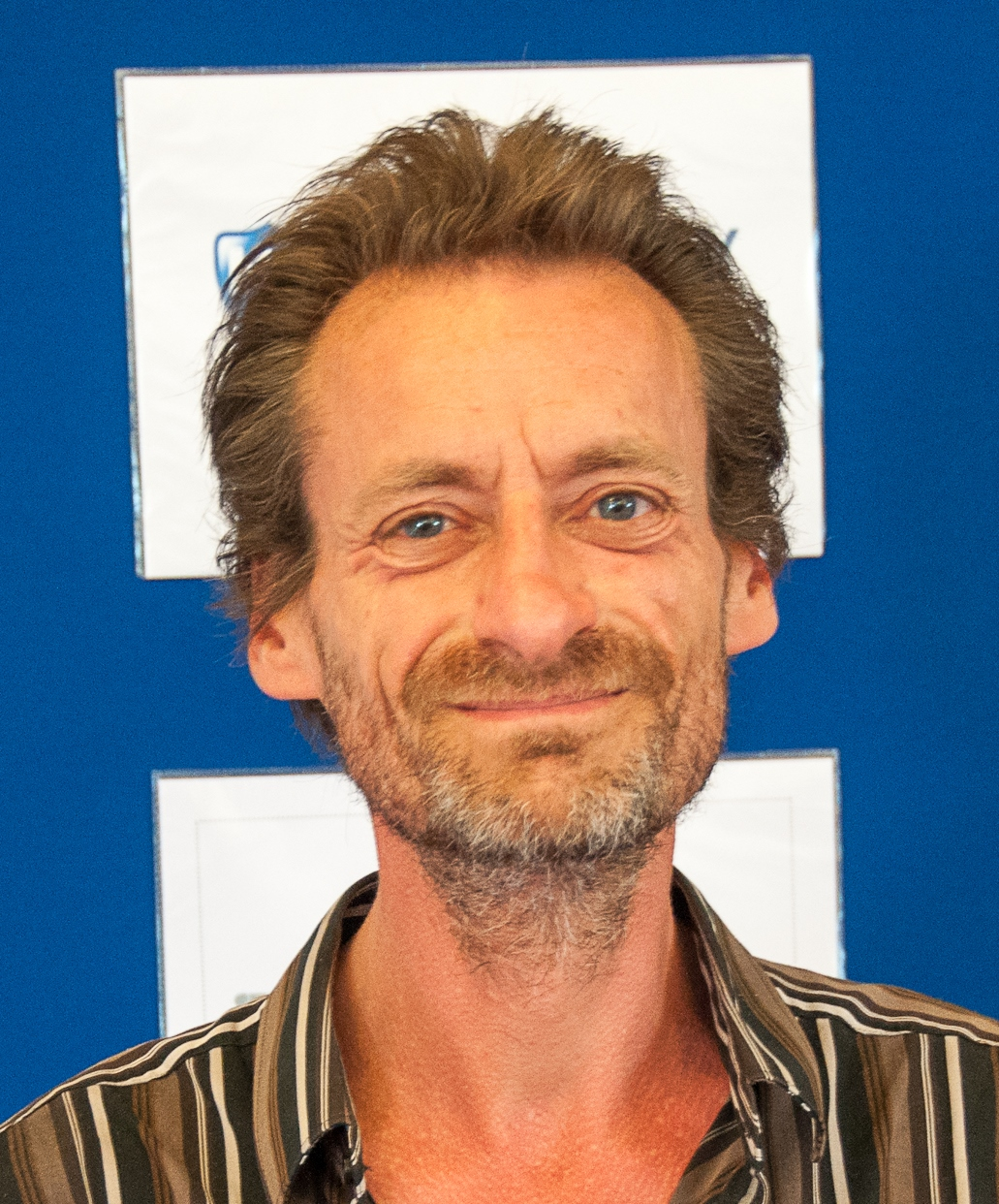
- Bosboom in 2012

Personal information
- Born: January 24, 1963 (age 63) Zaandam, Netherlands

Chess career
- Country: Netherlands
- Title: International Master (1990)
- Peak rating: 2490 (July 1998)

Manuel Bosboom is a Dutch chess player.

== Chess career ==
He has achieved wins against World Champion Garry Kasparov with the black pieces in a blitz game during the Hoogovens Wijk aan Zee Chess Tournament 1999 and against super-grandmaster Peter Leko in a classical game in just 26 moves.

Kasparov vs. Bosboom, Hoogovens Wijk aan Zee Chess Tournament 1999 Blitz

Position: f1 white king, d3 white pawn, b3 white pawn, d4 black bishop, c4 white bishop, b4 black pawn, a4 white pawn, h5 black pawn, g5 black queen, e5 white pawn, c5 black pawn, a5 black pawn, h6 black king, f6 white pawn, e6 black pawn, f7 black pawn, a8 white queen

Position after 50. Qa8. The game continued with 50… Qg1+ 51. Ke2 Qe3+ 52. Kd1 Qg1+ 53. Ke2 Qh2+ 54. Kd1 Bc3 0-1

He is renowned for his ability as a strong blitz player and for his creativity, including an early queen sacrifice in the Queen's Indian.

In January 2001, he finished 9th in Group B of the Corus Chess Tournament 2001, where he won against higher-rated grandmasters Thomas Luther and Boris Gulko.

In January 2007, he finished 8th in Group C of the Corus Chess Tournament 2007, where he scored wins against grandmaster Parimarjan Negi, Edwin van Haastert, grandmaster Peng Zhaoqin, Stellan Brynell, and Thomas Willemze.

In January 2009, he finished 10th in Group C of the Corus Chess Tournament 2009, where he managed to win against the group's second seed grandmaster David Howell.

In December 2021, Merijn van Delft and Peter Boel wrote Chess Buccaneer, a book covering elements of Bosboom's life and his games. In it, Bosboom names his favorite players as Alexander Alekhine, Mikhail Tal, and Leonid Stein.
