= Roeland Pruijssers =

Dutch chess grandmaster (born 1989)

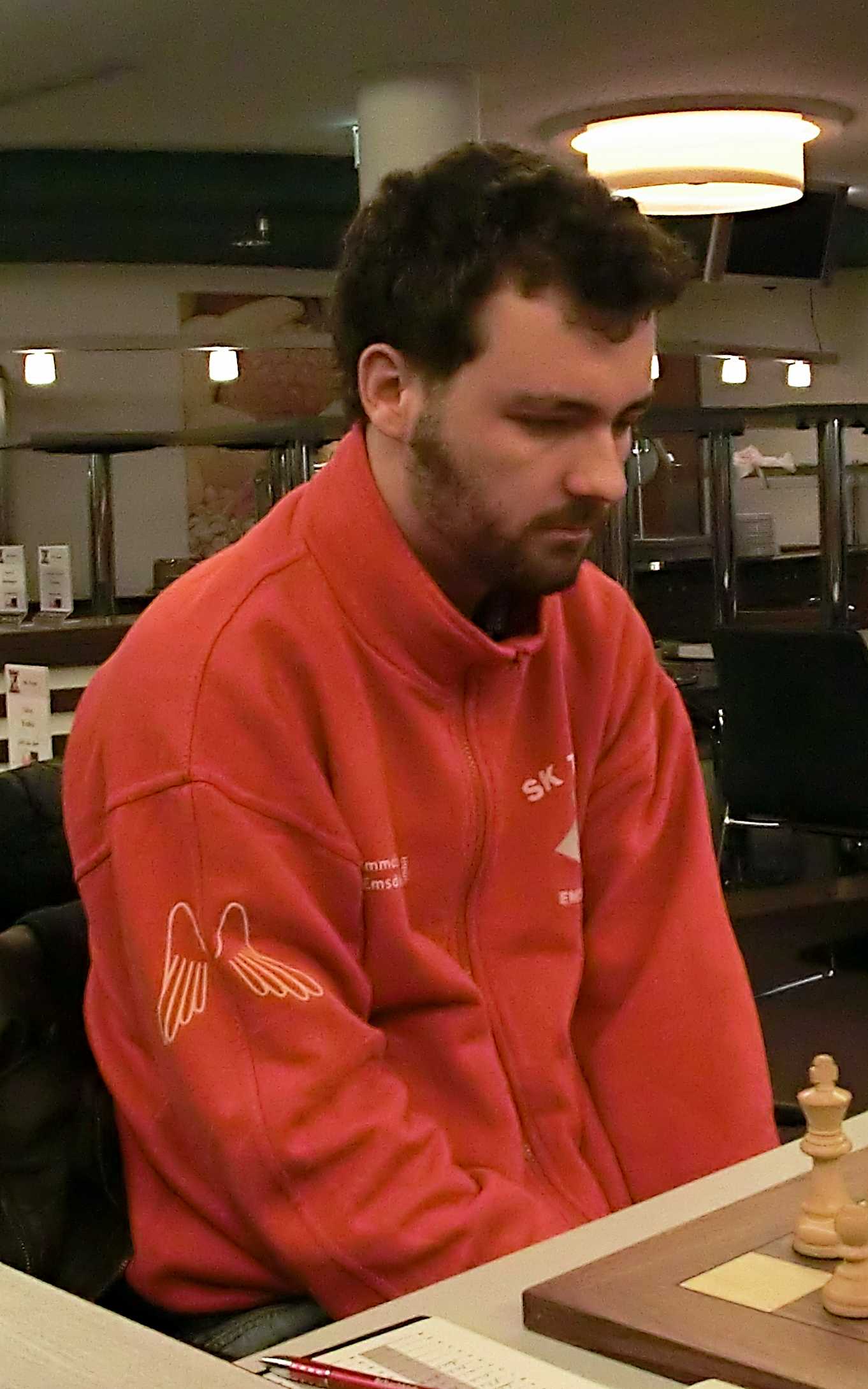
- Roeland Pruijssers, 2012

Personal information
- Born: 16 August 1989 (age 36) Hendrik-Ido-Ambacht, Netherlands

Chess career
- Country: Netherlands
- Title: Grandmaster (2012)
- FIDE rating: 2517 (July 2026)
- Peak rating: 2572 (April 2022)

Roeland Pruijssers (born 16 August 1989) is a Dutch chess grandmaster.

== Chess career ==
Born in 1989, Pruijssers earned his international master title in 2007 and his grandmaster title in 2012. He won the Leiden Open in 2016, scoring 7/9. He is the No. 13 ranked Dutch player as of June 2021.
