= Dennis de Vreugt =

Dutch chess grandmaster

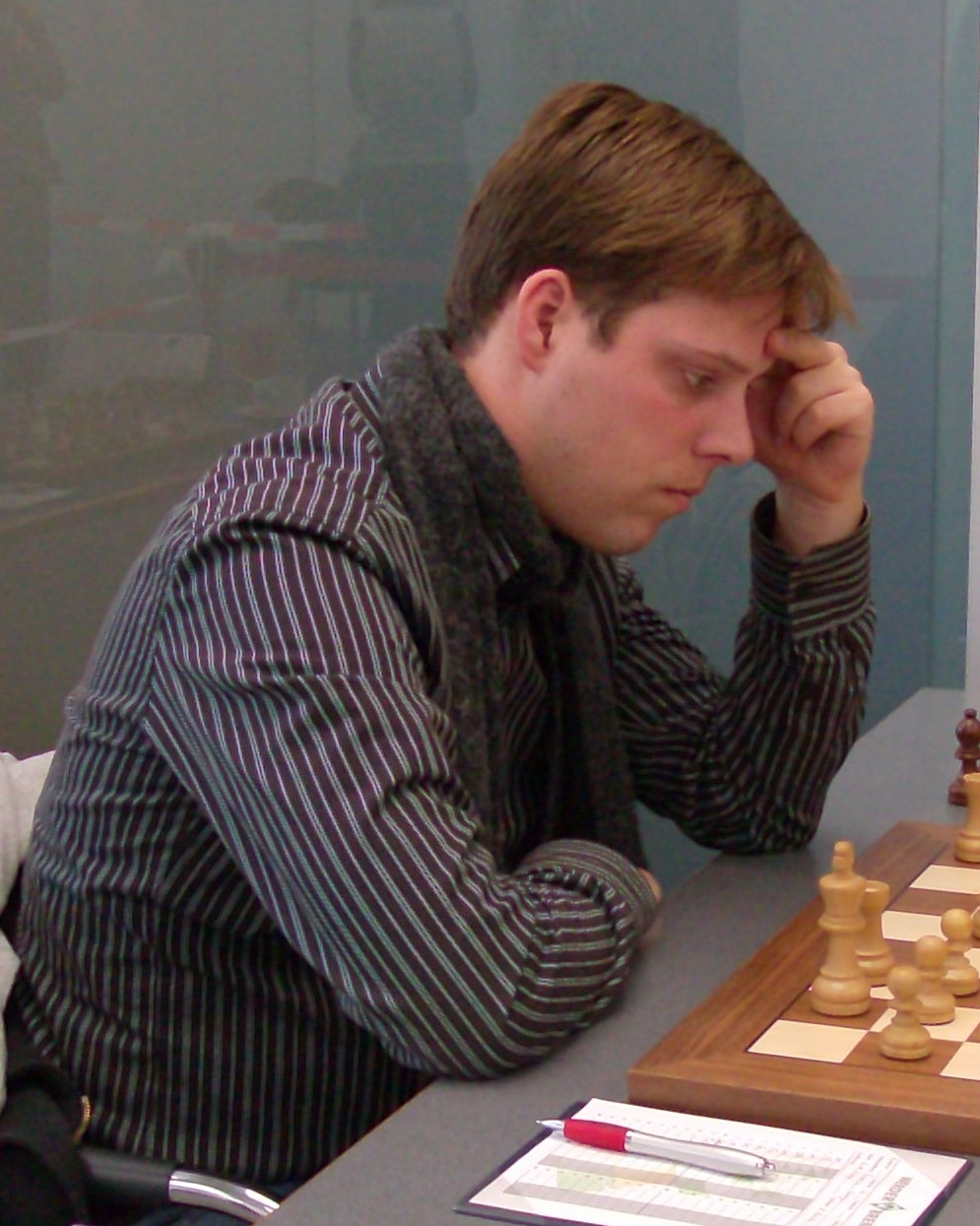
- Dennis de Vreugt in 2009

Personal information
- Born: 4 November 1980 (age 45)

Chess career
- Country: Netherlands
- Title: Grandmaster (2000)
- FIDE rating: 2430 (July 2026)
- Peak rating: 2511 (July 2000)

Dennis de Vreugt (born 4 November 1980) is a Dutch chess grandmaster (2000).

== Biography ==
In 1994, in Hengelo Dennis de Vreugt won Netherlands Youth Chess Championship in U16 age group. In 1998, he won European Youth Chess Championship in U18 age group, but in next year Dennis de Vreugt ranked first in European Junior Chess Championship in U20 age group. In 2000, in Istanbul he was included in the Dutch team in 34th Chess Olympiad as the second reservist, but did not play any party. In 2002, in Hoogeveen international chess tournament Dennis de Vreugt shared second place behind the winner Evgeny Alekseev. In 2003, in Santo Domingo he along with Bartosz Soćko, Vadim Milov, Alexander Moiseenko and Liviu-Dieter Nisipeanu took first place in the international chess tournament.

In 2000, he was awarded the FIDE Grandmaster (GM) title.
