= Jan Werle =

Dutch chess grandmaster (born 1984)

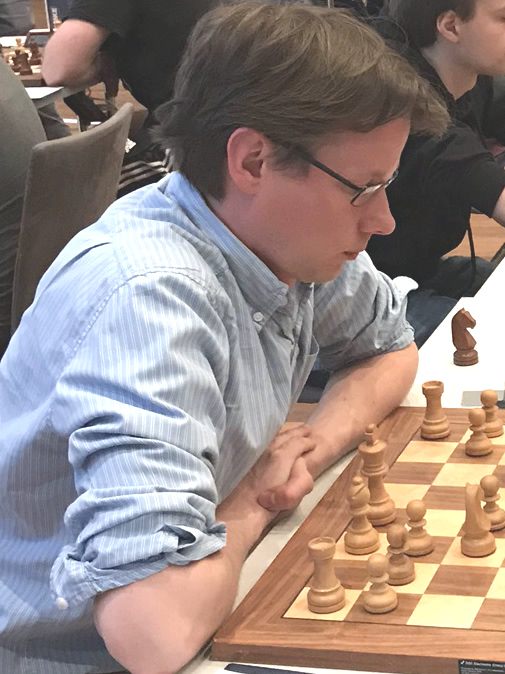
- Werle in Karlsruhe, 2019

Personal information
- Born: 15 January 1984 (age 42) Warnsveld, Netherlands
- Spouse: Iozefina Păuleţ (m. 2019)

Chess career
- Country: Netherlands
- Title: Grandmaster (2006)
- FIDE rating: 2540 (July 2026)
- Peak rating: 2607 (January 2009)

Jan Werle (born 15 January 1984) is a Dutch chess grandmaster. He earned the International Master title in 2001 and was subsequently named a Grandmaster in 2006. He reached his peak FIDE rating of 2607 in January 2009.

== Early success ==
Werle began learning chess at the age of five, after watching his father play with a friend. He progressed rapidly, winning medals at the European Youth Chess Championships at Kallithea in 2000 and 2001, where he took bronze in the Under-16 age category and silver in the Under-18 category, respectively.

== Further chess activity ==
Werle continued to develop over the next years, combining a structured coaching regime with frequent tournament practice. He became an International Master in 2001 and a grandmaster in 2006.

Asked about his chess style, he comments that he regards himself primarily as a positional player, but one that can cope well with tactical complications. Recently, he has worked with Dutch number one Ivan Sokolov to improve the opening phase of his game and with club-mate Sergei Tiviakov, has analyzed some of the games of the old masters, such as Botvinnik, Smyslov and Petrosian. He laments the passing of a time when such creative geniuses could fashion themselves an original playing style.

He was the runner-up at Groningen 2005 and at the Corus 'C' Group (Wijk aan Zee) 2006, winner of the Essent Open 2006 and winner at Lodi in 2007. At Liverpool in 2008, he made only a last-minute decision to enter the EU Individual Open Chess Championship and won the event, ahead of many of Europe's leading players, including Michael Adams, Nigel Short, Étienne Bacrot and Maxime Vachier-Lagrave.

== Team events ==
In the German Bundesliga, he was played for SG Aljechin Solingen, alongside compatriots Daniel Stellwagen, Jan Smeets and Sipke Ernst. In 2015/2016, he joined the Bundesliga team of Werder Bremen.

He also plays league chess in the Netherlands and speaks highly of his experiences in England, where he has represented the Bristol team in the 4NCL.

Although he is yet to play for the national team in formal competition, he has been a regular participant in the Howard Staunton Memorial Tournament in London (which occasionally doubles as an informal England vs Netherlands match).

== Other interests ==
Werle studied law at Groningen University while continuing to improve his chess. He admits that he finds the mental rigours of two such analytical and memory-intensive disciplines extremely demanding and can see the benefits of combining academic study with a more physical sport. His favourite sporting pastimes are football, tennis and rowing.

Regarding the future, his aspirations as a professional chess player are quite modest and he thinks it more likely that his long-term future will be as a practitioner of civil law.

Werle married Romanian chess Woman Grandmaster Iozefina Păuleţ on 7 September 2019.

== Notable chess games ==
- Jan Werle v Daniel Fridman - played at the 7th round of the EU championships in Liverpool 2008.
- Jan Werle v Peter Wells - played at the Staunton Memorial, London 2008.
