= Jan Smeets =

Dutch chess grandmaster (born 1985)

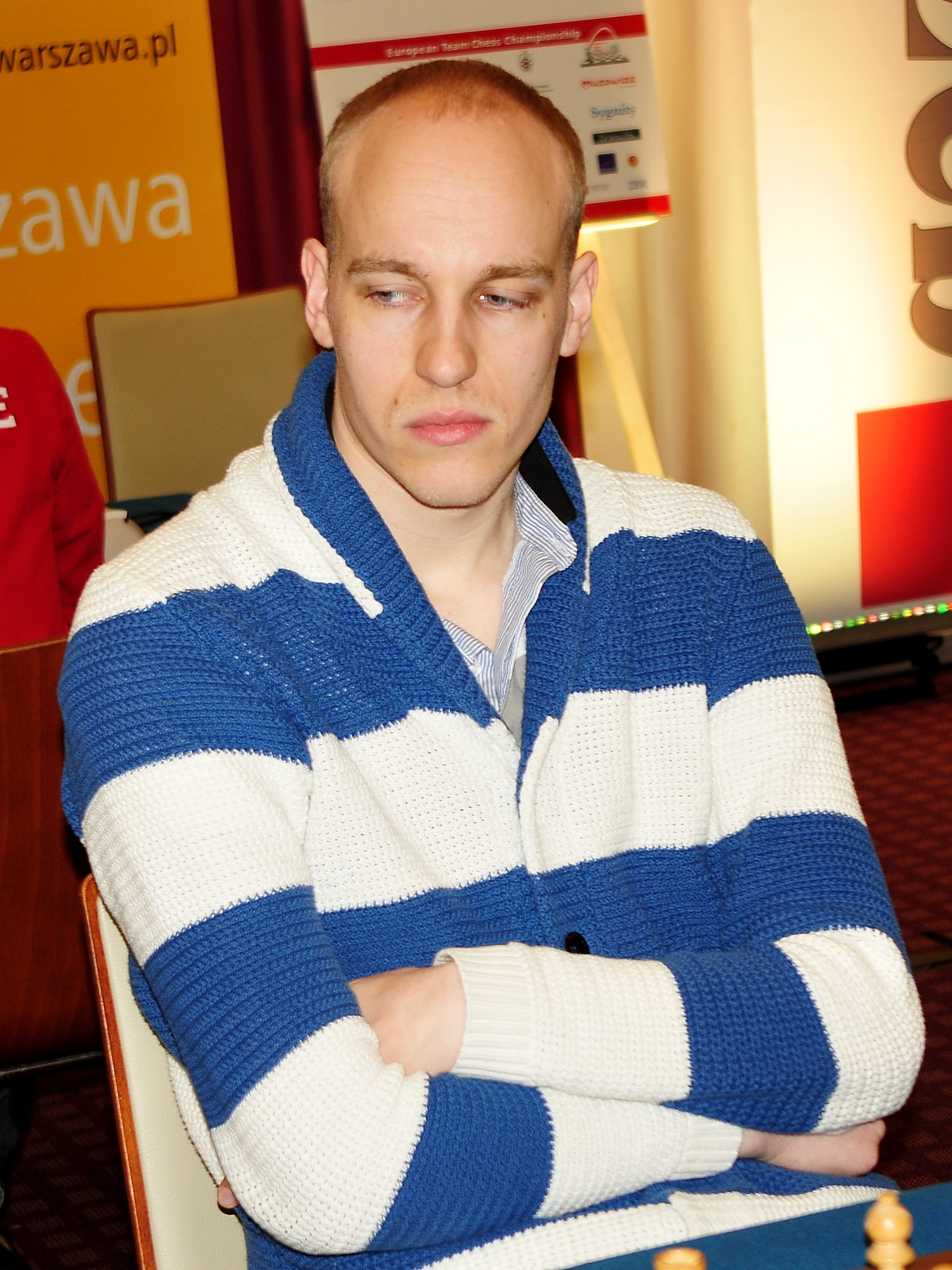
- Jan Smeets in 2013

Personal information
- Born: 5 April 1985 (age 41) Leiden, Netherlands

Chess career
- Country: Netherlands
- Title: Grandmaster (2004)
- FIDE rating: 2564 (September 2026)
- Peak rating: 2669 (July 2010)
- Peak ranking: No. 66 (July 2010)

Jan Smeets (born 5 April 1985) is a Dutch chess grandmaster. He is a two-time Dutch Chess Champion.

== Playing record ==
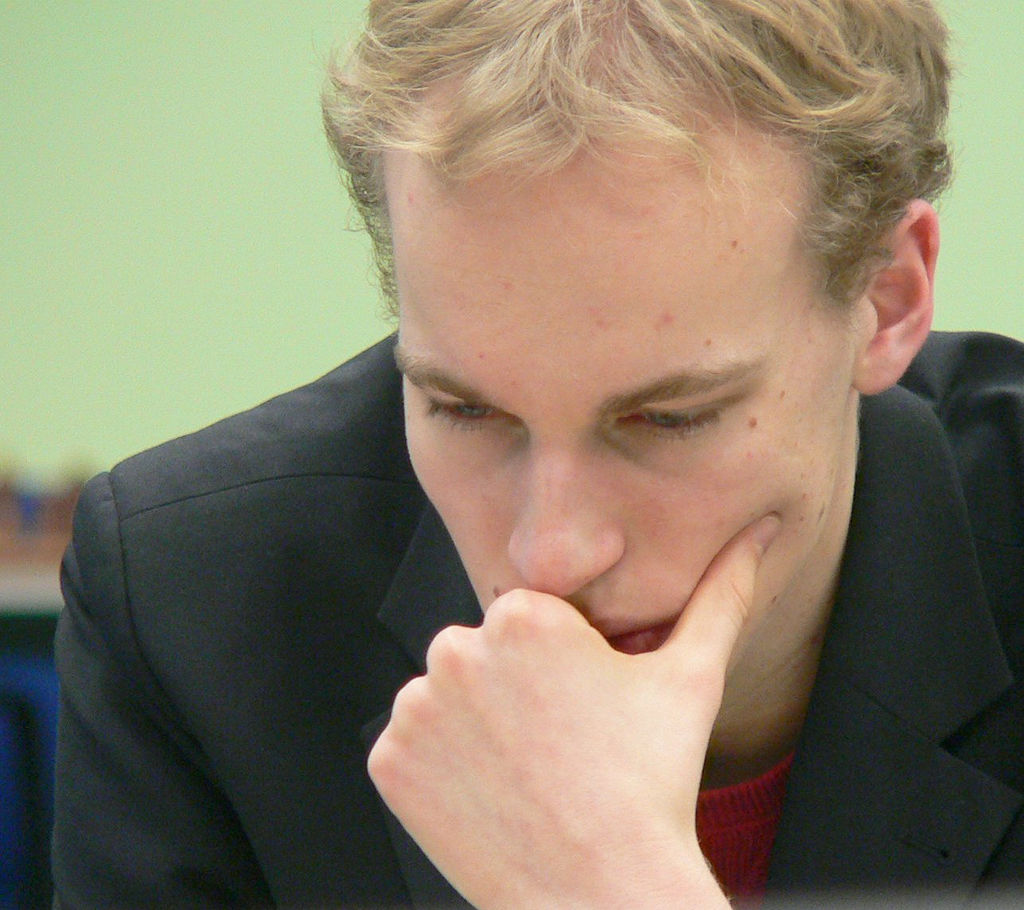
GM Jan Smeets

2004 was the year that his participation in senior tournaments began to yield encouraging results. He finished in second place in Gouda (after Daniel Fridman) and gained the Grandmaster title the same year. At Dos Hermanas the following year, he shared third behind Fridman and Bu Xiangzhi (with Sergey Volkov) and at the 2005 Hengelo Stork Young Masters event, he finished one-half point behind the Russian grandmaster Alexander Riazantsev. This was a year of significant breakthrough for Smeets, when he recorded one of his best performances at Wijk aan Zee's Corus 'B' tournament, finishing equal with Shakhriyar Mamedyarov for a share of second place, behind Teimour Radjabov. Left in his wake were a multitude of other strong players, including Peter Heine Nielsen, Ivan Cheparinov, Alexander Onischuk, Magnus Carlsen and Predrag Nikolić.

He played successfully at the Essent Open in Hoogeveen in 2007, finishing once more as runner-up, this time with Friso Nijboer, Jan Werle and Evgeny Postny, behind surprise winner Eltaj Safarli. In 2008, there were a number of excellent results; he was the winner of the Dutch Championship at Hilversum and finished third at the Howard Staunton Memorial Tournament, after Michael Adams and Loek van Wely, but ahead of Jan Timman, Ivan Sokolov and Nigel Short. He took a share of fifth place at the EU Individual Open Chess Championship, was selected to represent the Netherlands at the Dresden Olympiad and shared second place in the four player Essent (Crown Group) Tournament, after Ivan Sokolov and equal with former World Junior Champion Ahmed Adly. It was also a year in which his Elo rating broke through the 2600 barrier. In 2010 Smeets won the Dutch Championship for the second time.

Smeets is a keen player of team chess and competes in the national leagues of Germany (for Bundesliga team Solingen SG 1868), Belgium and the Netherlands (where he drew with former World Champion Vladimir Kramnik).

== Notable games ==
- Mamedyarov vs Smeets, Wijk aan Zee, Corus 'B', 2005, Caro-Kann, 0–1
- Smeets vs Short, London, Staunton Memorial, 2008, Closed Spanish, 1-0
