= Eric Lobron =

German chess grandmaster (born 1960)

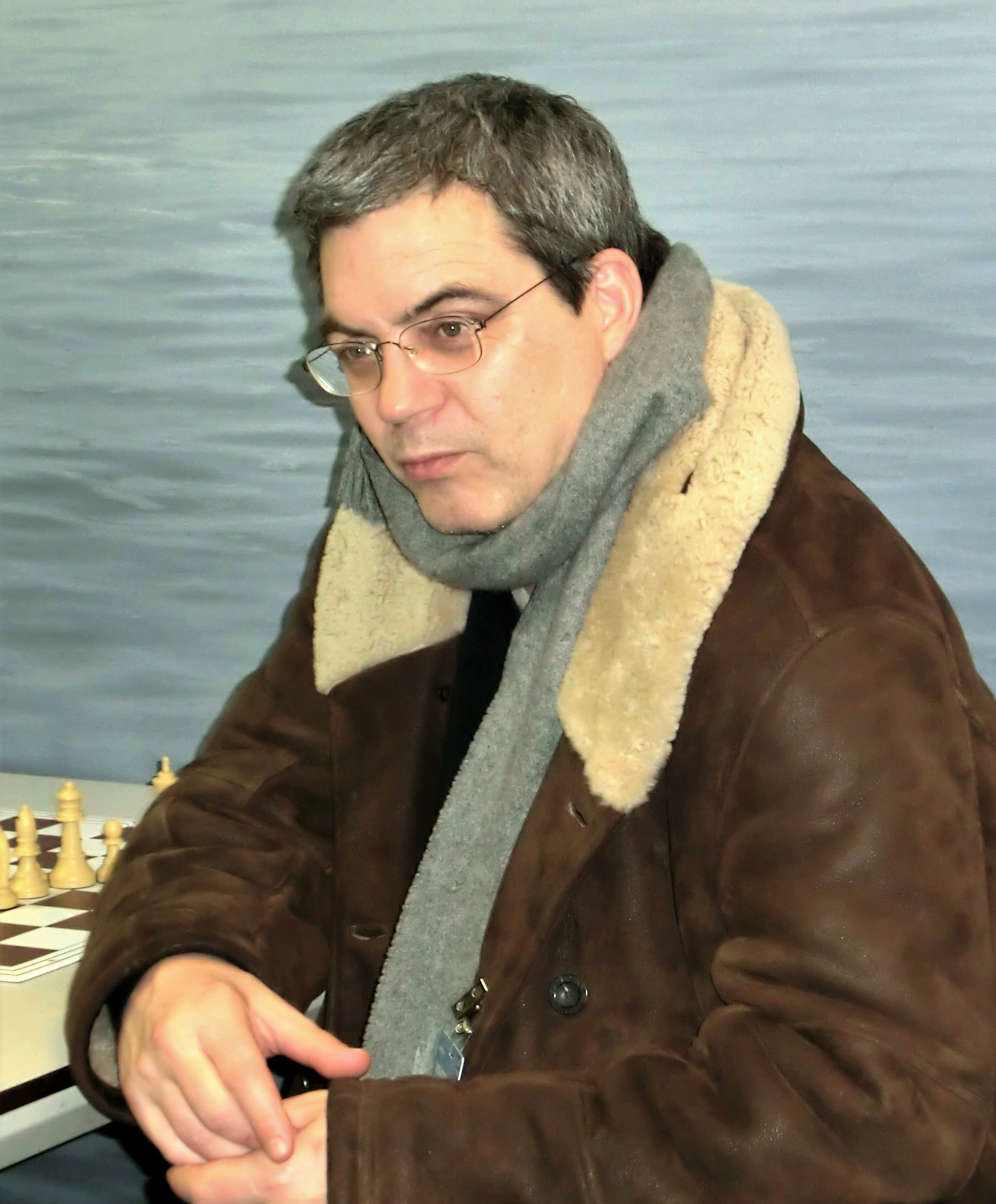
- Lobron in 2013

Personal information
- Born: May 7, 1960 (age 66) Philadelphia, Pennsylvania, U.S.

Chess career
- Country: Germany
- Title: Grandmaster (1982)
- FIDE rating: 2467 (September 2026)
- Peak rating: 2625 (July 1992)
- Peak ranking: No. 21 (July 1992)

Eric Lobron (born 7 May 1960) is a German chess grandmaster. A former two-time national champion, he has been awarded the title Grandmaster by the World Chess Federation (FIDE).

== Biography ==
Born in Germantown, Philadelphia, Pennsylvania, United States, Lobron moved with his family to Germany at the age of five and was raised in Wiesbaden. It was soon apparent that he had a talent for the game and he became the national junior champion in 1978.

Just two years later, Lobron's continued rapid progress enabled him to attain International Master status and win the West German Championship at Bad Neuenahr. Buoyed by this success, it was not long before he decided to become a full-time chess professional, whereupon he broke from his law degree to embark on the international chess tournament circuit.

There were several notable achievements from the outset, including victories at Biel 1981 (with Vlastimil Hort), Ramat Hasharon 1982 and Manila 1982 (with Lev Polugaevsky). Lobron's qualification as a Grandmaster took place the same year and he followed up with several more tournament wins, either outright or shared; at New York Kavkasian 1983 and New York Manhattan 1985 (both invitation tournaments), Biel 1986 (again with Lev Polugaevsky), Brussels and Ter Apel (both 1987), Lyons 1988 (with Simen Agdestein), the strong New York (Open) 1992 as sole winner, Wiesbaden and Graz (both 1993), Bad Zwesten 2000 and Wijk aan Zee 2003. Meanwhile, he was West German Champion for a second time in 1984.

In attempting to reach the latter stages of the (PCA) World Championship, Lobron scored well at the Groningen 1993 qualifying tournament, outperforming many players rated more highly, including Judit Polgár, Veselin Topalov and Evgeny Bareev.

In team chess, Lobron was for many years a stalwart of the Bundesliga and represented Germany at all of the Olympiads between 1980 and 1996, except for the event held at Dubai in 1986. At the European Team Chess Championship (ETC) he played three times, in 1983, 1989 and 1992, being honoured with selection at top board on the first and last occasions. At the Olympiad, Lobron earned an individual bronze medal for his board three performance in 1990 and at the ETC, earned a team bronze in 1989.

Reputed to have been a successful trader on the stock market during profitable times, Lobron acquired 'celebrity' status in 2004, when he became romantically involved with Estonian supermodel Carmen Kass, herself a keen chess player and President of the Estonian Chess Federation. On the lead up to the 2008 Olympiad, Kass campaigned to bring the event to her home country, but ultimately lost out to Dresden's bid.

At the peak of his chess career, Eric Lobron had an Elo rating of 2625. Since the mid-2000s he has played little over-the-board chess, but competes online at The Internet Chess Club as Yardbird, where he holds one of the highest blitz ratings. He is also known to be a good player of Backgammon.
