= Michał Krasenkow =

Polish chess grandmaster (born 1963)

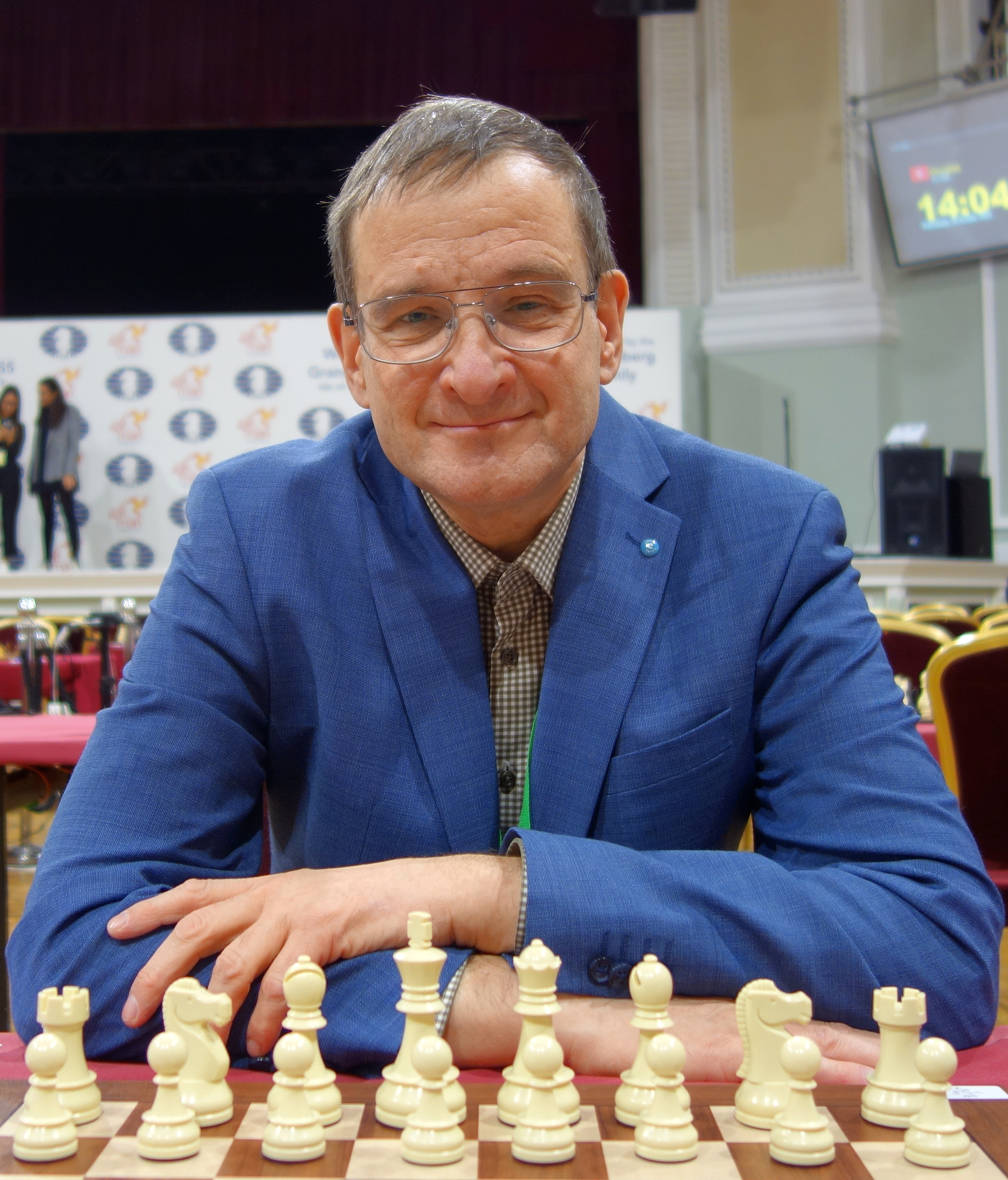
- Krasenkow in 2023

Personal information
- Born: 14 November 1963 (age 62) Moscow, Russian SFSR, Soviet Union

Chess career
- Country: Soviet Union (until 1992); Russia (1992–1995); Poland (since 1996)
- Title: Grandmaster (1990)
- FIDE rating: 2505 (July 2026)
- Peak rating: 2702 (July 2000)
- Peak ranking: No. 10 (July 2000)

Michał Krasenkow (born 14 November 1963) is a Polish chess grandmaster, chess trainer and writer. He is one of the strongest Polish chess players since World War II. His playing style is aggressive and he has won many "best game" awards.

== Life and career ==
He was born in Moscow (formerly Mikhail Vladimirovich Krasenkov, Russian: Михаил Владимирович Красенков). Master of applied mathematics (1985). His first notable successes date back to the 80s: he became a national master of the USSR in 1982, an International Master in 1988 and an International Grandmaster in 1989. He became Champion of Georgia in 1987 and team champion of the USSR (with "Tigran Petrosian Chess Club", Moscow) in 1990.

In 1992 Krasenkow emigrated to Poland. Since 1996 he represents that country at international competitions. Two-times champion of Poland (2000, 2002). Krasenkow won Polish team championships 14 times: 1991, 1993, 1994, 1995, 1997, and 1998 with "Stilon" Gorzów Wielkopolski, 1999, 2000, 2001, 2002, 2003, 2004, 2005, 2009 with "Polonia" Warsaw. European Cup winner (1997, with the Russian team "Ladia" Azov) and silver medalist (2001, 2003, 2005 with "Polonia Plus GSM" Warsaw, 2008 with OSC Baden-Baden). Representative of Poland at European team championships and Chess Olympiads since 1996 (European team championships: Pula 1997 – 3rd place on Board 1, Batumi 1999 – 2nd place on Board 1). Also German team champion (2006, 2007) and German Cup winner (2003, 2005, 2007, 2008) with Ooser Schachclub Baden-Baden, French team champion (2010) with L'Echiquier Chalonnais, Turkish team champion (2016) with Hatay Buyuksehir Belediyesi Genclik Spor Kulubu.

== Notable performances ==
He participated in all FIDE k.o. World Championships since 1997. Best results: Groningen/Lausanne (1997/98) – 5th round qualifier (last 9); Las Vegas (1999) – 3rd round qualifier (last 32); Tripoli (2004) – 4th round qualifier (last 16). 3rd round qualifier of Chess World Cup 2021.

Major tournament victories: Moscow 1992 (Mikhail Tal Memorial) – I-III places (tied), New York 1997 – I-II (He took his prize money in cash and was robbed of all of it at a train station upon returning to Poland), Vilnius 1997 (Vladas Mikėnas Memorial) – I, Shanghai 2001 (Tan Chin Nam Cup – category 16) – I-III, Ostrava 2007 (category 16) – I, Moscow Open 2014 – I-IV, Warsaw 2014 (Miguel Najdorf Memorial) – I-VII.

Important tournament victories: Budapest 1989 – I-II places (tied), Vienna 1990 – I-VI, Gausdal 1991 – I-II, Katowice 1992 – I-II, Metz 1993 – I-III, Pardubice 1993 – I-V, Las Palmas 1993 – I-II, Pardubice 1994 – I-II, Stockholm 1994/95 – I, Stockholm 1995/96 – I, Asti 1996 – I, Reggio Emilia 1996/97 – I, Buenos Aires 1998 – I-V, Cutro 1999 – I, Shanghai 2000 – I-II, Barlinek 2001 – I-III, Kavala 2001 – I-II, Bad Wiessee 2001 – I-IV, Wijk aan Zee 2002, tournament "B" – I, Budapest 2004 – I, Vlissingen 2006 – I, Wijk aan Zee 2007, tournament "C" – I, Helsingør 2007 – I-V, Mumbai 2008 – I-VI, Hilversum 2009 – I-IV, Vlissingen 2009 – I, Stockholm 2012/13 – I, Vlissingen 2013 – I-IV, Vlissingen 2014 – I-IV, Porticcio 2017 – I, Dhaka 2021 - I, Porticcio 2023 – I-II, Chennai 2026 - I. Runner-up in major tournaments in Hastings 1993/94 (behind John Nunn), Polanica-Zdrój 1995 (behind Veselin Topalov), Pamplona 1998/99 (behind Alexander Morozevich), Lviv 2000, (FIDE Category 17) behind Vassily Ivanchuk. Polanica-Zdrój 1998 (Category 17) – III-VI places.

In 2000 Krasenkow crossed the then extra-class threshold of 2700 rating points, obtaining 2702 in July and October rating lists. He was ranked number ten in the world at that time.

Krasenkow achieved notable successes in rapid chess: USSR Cup (Tallinn 1988) – I-II places (tied), European Championships (Gijón 1988) – IV-VII, GMA tournament (Murcia, 1990, with more than 100 Grandmasters participating) – V-VI, USSR Cup (Lviv, 1990) – I, CIS Cup (Moscow, 1991) – I, Russian Open Cup (Moscow, 1997) – I, León 2010 – I-II.

He was the Blitz Chess Champion of Poland in 1999 and 2001.

== Coaching work ==
Krasenkow has coached national teams, young prodigies, including many future GMs, and occasionally top players including Viswanathan Anand. National coach of Poland in 2010–2014 and Turkey in 2016-2018. He has been a FIDE Senior Trainer since 2012.

== Theoretical contributions ==
Krasenkow has made major contributions to several areas of opening theory, most notably in the Classical King's Indian Defense. His consistent use of the relative sideline 5.h3 in that opening helped to establish it as a viable manner of combating the King's Indian. Other members of the elite now use the system from time to time, including on occasion Magnus Carlsen. It is typically called the Makogonov system, though some authors now refer to it as the Krasenkow System; he himself calls it the Bagirov system.

Another important contribution is the so-called Groningen Attack in the English Opening (discovered simultaneously with Vadim Zviagintsev): 1.Nf3 Nf6 2.c4 e6 3.Nc3 Bb4 4.g4!?

== Writings ==
Krasenkow has written several books on chess openings and middlegames:

- The Open Spanish. London, Cadogan Books, 1995
- The Sveshnikov Sicilian. London, Cadogan Books, 1996
- Finding chess jewels. London, Everyman Chess, 2013
- Learn from Michal Krasenkow. Landegem, Thinkers Publishing, 2019
