= Daniël Stellwagen =

Dutch chess grandmaster (born 1987)

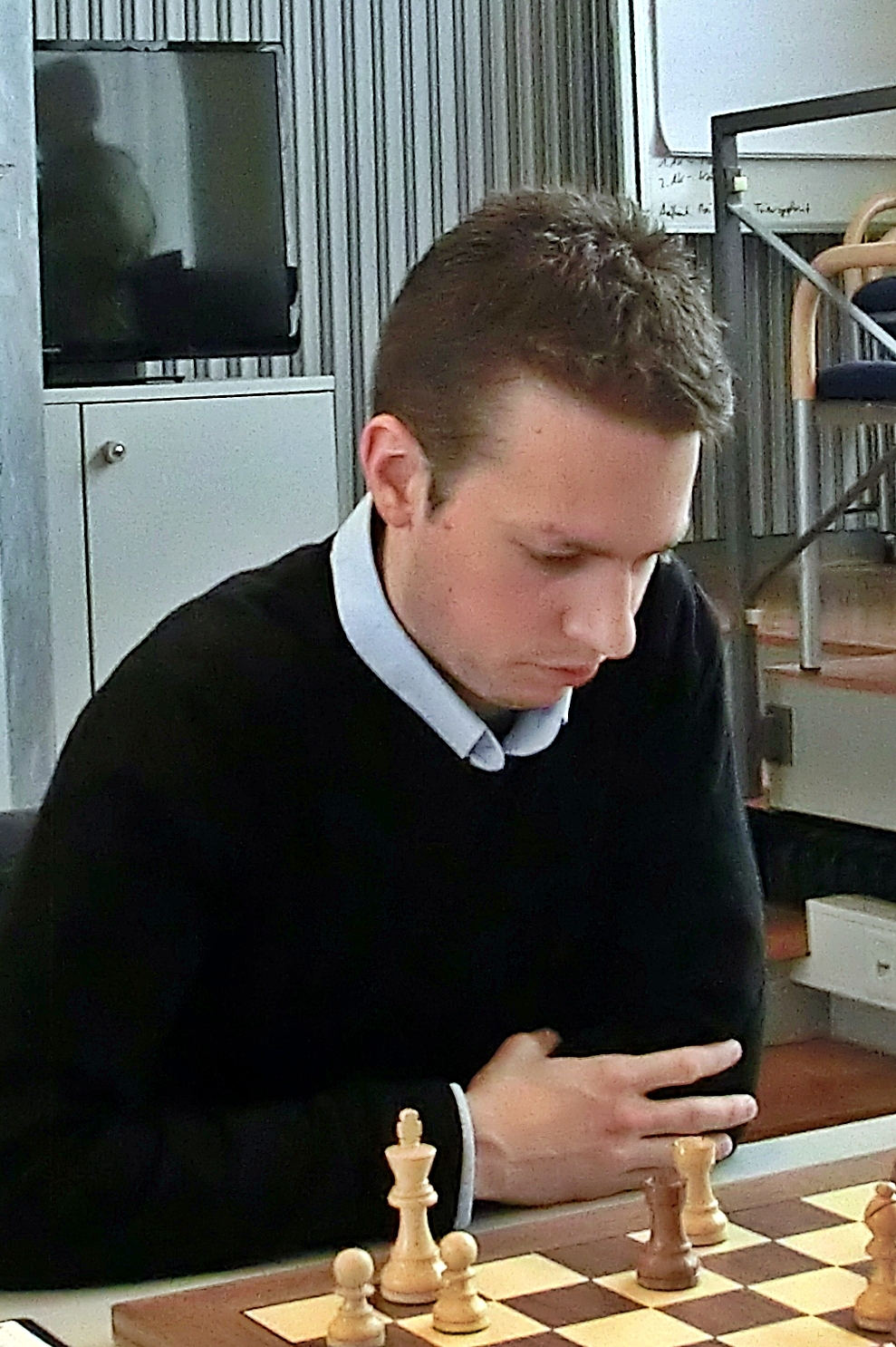
- Stellwagen in 2013

Personal information
- Born: 1 March 1987 (age 39) Soest, Netherlands

Chess career
- Country: Netherlands
- Title: Grandmaster (2004)
- FIDE rating: 2605 (July 2026)
- Peak rating: 2639 (October 2007)
- Peak ranking: No. 81 (October 2007)

Daniël Stellwagen (born 1 March 1987) is a Dutch chess grandmaster.

== Chess career ==
In 1999 he won the Dutch Youth Championship (U12) and won silver both at the World Youth Championship (U12) and the European Youth Championship (U12). In 2002 he became an international master. In 2003, at age 15, he achieved major success by finishing at 2nd place in the Grandmaster B-group of the Corus Chess tournament, earning his first grandmaster norm in the process. In 2003 he also won the endgame study solving contest at the De Feijter Festival in Deventer with an unprecedented 100%. In 2004 he became a grandmaster at 18 years old, making him the youngest Dutch grandmaster ever, a record that was later broken by Anish Giri.

Between 2003 and 2008 he participated in the Dutch Championships every year, becoming one of the most successful players in the championship with four second places overall. In 2007 he shared first place in the Dutch Championship but lost the final tiebreak to Sergey Tiviakov. In 2007 Daniel also finished shared 5th at the World Junior Chess Championship in Yerevan. Daniel has been playing for the Dutch national team between 2007 and 2012, contributing to the team's top 8 ranking in the recent European Team Championship and Chess Olympiad. He played his last FIDE rated game in January 2014, in the German Bundesliga.

== Personal life ==
Stellwagen earned his PhD in inorganic chemistry from Utrecht University with the thesis "Solid acid catalysts for transesterification and esterification".
