= John van der Wiel =

Dutch chess grandmaster (born 1959)

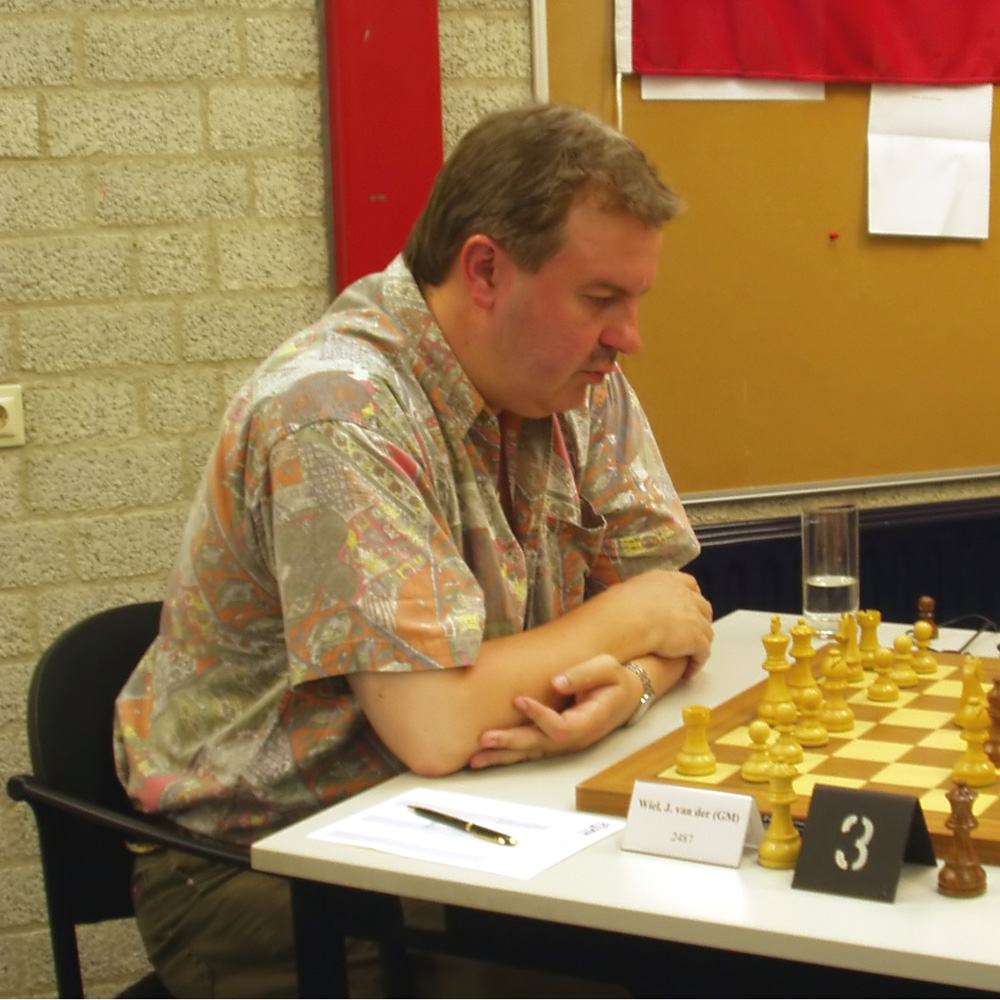
- Van der Wiel in 2007

Personal information
- Born: 9 August 1959 (age 66) Leiden, Netherlands

Chess career
- Country: Netherlands
- Title: Grandmaster (1982)
- Peak rating: 2590 (January 1987)
- Peak ranking: No. 16 (January 1987)

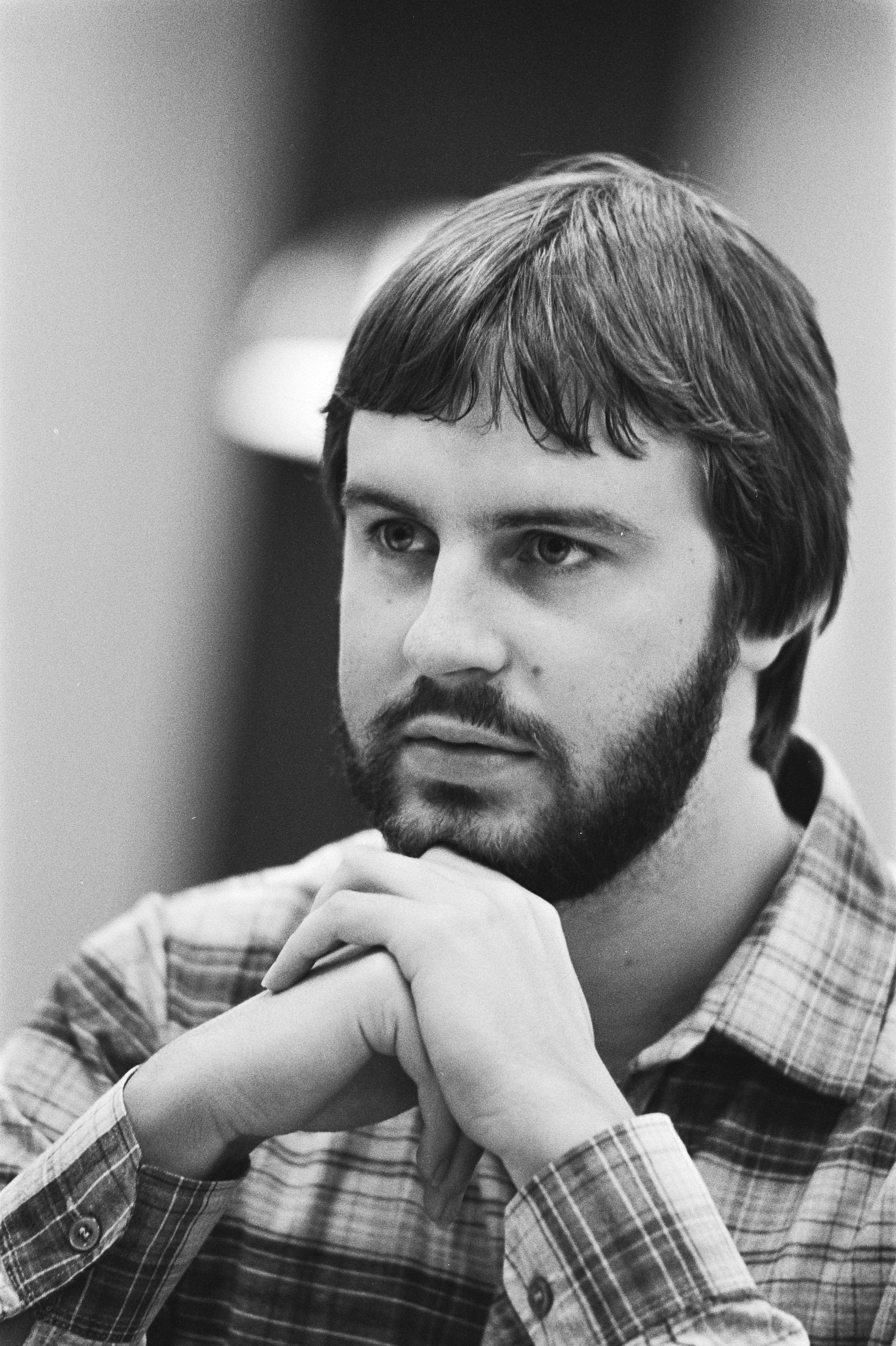
Van der Wiel in 1983

John van der Wiel (born 9 August 1959) is a Dutch chess grandmaster. He is a two-time Dutch Chess Champion.

The van der Wiel Attack of the Advance Variation Caro-Kann chess opening is named after him.

== Chess career ==
Born in 1959, Van der Wiel won the Daniël Noteboom tournament in Leiden in 1976 and 1977. He won the European Junior Chess Championship in 1978, and was awarded the Grandmaster title in 1982.

He won the Dutch Chess Championship in 1984 and 1986. He was between 1979 and 2004 playing in this championship for 26 consecutive times. Besides winning two times, he came in second nine times.

He was a participant in the Chess Olympiads of 1980, 1982, 1984 and from 1988 up to 1998.

He has competed in several Interzonal tournaments: Moscow (1982) where he finished in 11th–12th place, and Biel (1985) 4th–6th place (where he lost a playoff for the final Candidates Tournament place to Nigel Short). His best results in the other international tournaments have included Sochi (1980) 4th–5th place; Wijk aan Zee (1981, additional tournament) 1st place; and Wijk aan Zee (1982) 3rd–4th.

He won tournaments in Novi Sad 1982, Århus 1983, Ostend 1983, San Bernardino 1986, Amsterdam OHRA 1987, Baden-Baden II 1992, Elgoibar 1998 and Brasschaat 2010.

In 1999 he played with the team Panfox Breda at the European Club Cup in Belgrade.

In the past, he was a notable "computer killer".
