= Friso Nijboer =

Dutch chess grandmaster (born 1965)

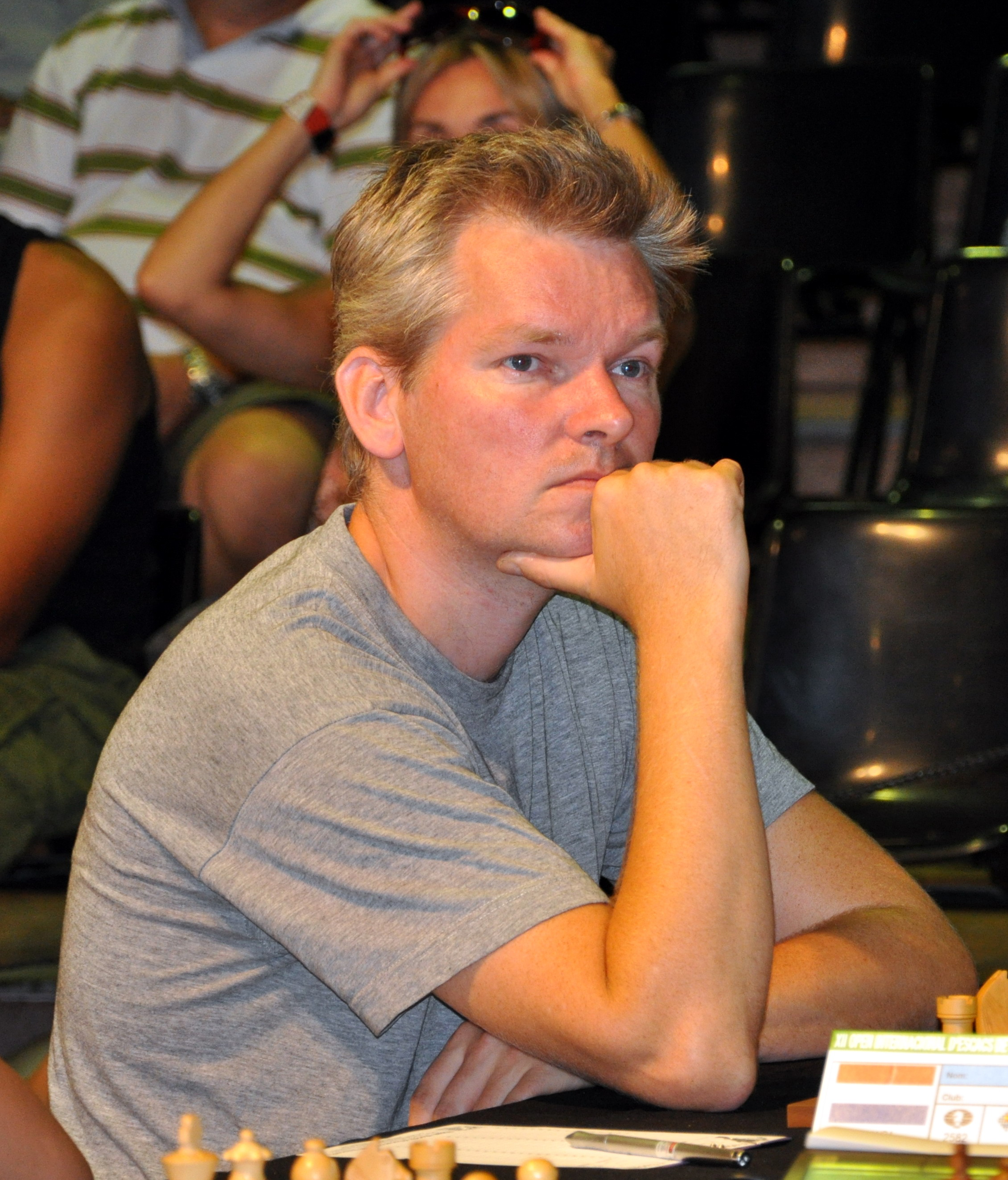
- Nijboer in 2010

Personal information
- Born: May 26, 1965 (age 61) Nijmegen, Netherlands

Chess career
- Country: Netherlands
- Title: Grandmaster (1993)
- FIDE rating: 2441 (July 2026)
- Peak rating: 2641 (October 2006)
- Peak ranking: No. 62 (July 1997)

Friso Nijboer (born May 26, 1965) is a Dutch chess player. He achieved the title of Grandmaster in 1996.

Nijboer won the Vlissingen Chess Tournament in 2002 and 2005, and won the 3rd Nancy Chess Festival in 2005. He participated in six Chess Olympiads (1996–2006) with an overall performance of +18−14=21.

== Notable games ==
- This game was played in the 2006 Dutch Chess Championship with Nijboer as White and Grandmaster Jan Timman as Black. The game followed the chess opening known as the Poisoned Pawn Variation of the French Defense:
  Nijboer vs. Jan Timman
  1. e4 e6 2. d4 d5 3. Nc3 Bb4 4. e5 c5 5. a3 Bxc3+ 6. bxc3 Ne7 7. Qg4 Qc7 8. Qxg7 Rg8 9. Qxh7 cxd4 10. Ne2 Nbc6 11. f4 Bd7 12. Qd3 dxc3 13. Nxc3 a6 14. Rb1 Rc8 15. h4 Nf5 16. Rh3 Ncd4 17. h5 Qc5 18. Rxb7 Nb5 19. Ne4! Timman had overlooked 19.Ne4 and abruptly resigned: 1–0
- This game also took place in the 2006 Dutch Chess Championship. Nijboer's opponent, Erwin L'Ami, entered the more rarely seen Veresov Attack, Dutch System opening:
  Erwin L'Ami vs. Nijboer
  1.d4 f5 2.Nc3 d5 3.Bf4 Nf6 4.e3 e6 5.Nf3 a6 6.Ne5 c5 7.g4 fxg4 8.Nxg4 Nc6 9.Bh3 Nxg4 10.Bxg4 Be7 11.dxc5 0-0 12.Na4 e5 13.Bg3 Bxc5 14.Bf3 Be6 15.Nxc5 Qa5+ 16.c3 Qxc5 17.0-0 Rad8 18.Re1 Qb5 19.Qe2 Qa4 20.b3 Qa5 21.Rac1 Qc7 22.Red1 Qf7 23.Bg4 Bxg4 24.Qxg4 Rd6 25.Rd2 h5 26.Qe2 g5 27.h3 Rf6 28.Rcd1 h4 29.Bh2 Rf3 30.Qf1 Kh8 31.Qg2 g4 32.hxg4 h3 33.Qf1 Qg6 34.Kh1 Qxg4 35.a4 Rxe3 36.fxe3 Rxf1+ 37.Rxf1 Qe4+ 38.Kg1 Qxe3+ 39.Rdf2 d4 40.Kh1 Qe4+ 41.Kg1 Qg6+ 42.Kh1 dxc3 43.Re1 c2 0–1

== Publications ==
Nijboer has written four main different chess publications on opening theory:

- Tactics in the Chess Opening 1: Sicilian Defence. Interchess BV, Alkmaar 2003, ISBN 90-5691-112-0
- Tactics in the Chess Opening 2: Open Games. Interchess BV, Alkmaar 2005, ISBN 90-5691-124-4
- Tactics in the Chess Opening 3: French Defence and other Half-Open Games, Interchess BV, Alkmaar 2005, ISBN 90-5691-162-7
- Tactics in the Chess Opening 4: Queen's Gambit (Trompowsky & Torre), Interchess BV, Alkmaar 2006, ISBN 90-5691-172-4
