= 1974 in chess =

Events in chess in 1974;

== Top players ==
FIDE top 10 by Elo rating - January 1974

1. Bobby Fischer United States 2780
2. Anatoly Karpov Soviet Union 2660
3. Mikhail Tal Soviet Union 2660
4. Boris Spassky Soviet Union 2655
5. Viktor Korchnoi Soviet Union 2650
6. Lajos Portisch Hungary 2650
7. Tigran Petrosian Soviet Union 2640
8. Mikhail Botvinnik Soviet Union 2630
9. Lev Polugaevsky Soviet Union 2625
10. Bent Larsen Denmark 2620

== Chess news in brief ==
- The meteoric rise of Anatoly Karpov continues to hold the attention of the chess world, as he chalks up win after win in the latest world championship qualifying cycle. His Moscow based, Candidates' quarter-final match against Lev Polugaevsky, is a one-sided affair and Karpov emerges the victor by 5½-2½. In the other candidates' quarter-final matches, Viktor Korchnoi beats Henrique Mecking in Augusta, Georgia, Tigran Petrosian beats Lajos Portisch in Palma de Mallorca, and Boris Spassky beats Robert Byrne in San Juan. In the semi-finals, Korchnoi defeats Petrosian by 3½-1½ in Odesa, while Karpov is again utterly convincing, winning 7-4 against Spassky in Leningrad. The battle between Karpov and Korchnoi in the (Moscow) final proves to be a tense and difficult struggle, although the younger man ultimately triumphs 12½-11½, amidst a large number of draws. As the winning candidate, Karpov is scheduled to meet Bobby Fischer for a world championship decider in 1975 and for his efforts in 1974, is awarded his second successive Chess Oscar. Meanwhile, Fischer puts forward a plan to FIDE for the conditions of the title match. Running to 179 numbered paragraphs, each of his conditions are acceptable to all parties, except for two. The rejected conditions concern the match being of unlimited length (first to win 10 games, regardless of draws) and that the title stays with the holder in the event of the score reaching 9-9. Fischer insists he will not back down on these stipulations and threatens to resign his title if they are not accepted. He has until April 1975 to finally decide.
- Evgeny Vasiukov excels at Manila, winning the tournament with 10½/14, ahead of Tigran Petrosian (9½/14) and Bent Larsen (9/14).
- Montilla-Moriles is won by Ivan Radulov with 5½/9. In joint second place are Lubomir Kavalek and Helmut Pfleger (both 5/9). Oddly, the winner is the lowest rated of the ten contestants and while there is a large percentage of draws, many of the games are exciting and worthy of such a strong competition.
- The 14th IBM tournament is held at Amsterdam and is a close run affair, with three grandmasters all sharing first place. Borislav Ivkov, Vladimir Tukmakov and Vlastimil Jansa score an identical 10/15. As with the Manila and Montilla tournaments, the entrants are all titled players, making for one of the strongest events of the year.
- The Nice Olympiad is held at the Palais des Expositions. Offering an enormous playing arena, the venue should surpass those of recent years, but a lack of air-conditioning and poor lighting provokes some criticism from the participants. After managing only narrow wins at Siegen and Skopje, the Soviets reassert their pre-eminence at Nice, winning convincingly with 46/60, to silver medalling Yugoslavia's 37½/60. Third place is shared between the US and Bulgaria with 36½/60. Bulgaria's excellent showing can be partly explained by the incentives offered by their federation. A team medal of any kind would have earned each player a car, but they just miss the bronze on tie-break. Anatoly Karpov, Boris Spassky, Tigran Petrosian and Mikhail Tal take home individual gold medals for outstanding performances on their respective boards, while Viktor Korchnoi and Gennady Kuzmin must settle for bronze. Petrosian scores 12½/14 for an 89.3% performance, the best of the event. Michael Stean picks up the $1000 Turover Brilliancy Prize for 'best game of the Olympiad' against Walter Browne. Wolfgang Uhlmann coins the phrase "One is permitted to lose to Karpov with Black" after suffering defeat in their round 4 encounter.
- Tony Miles wins the 13th World Junior Chess Championship, held in Manila, after narrowly missing out the previous year to Alexander Beliavsky. Miles' good form keeps him on track to becoming England's first grandmaster.
- The 42nd USSR Chess Championship is won jointly by Alexander Beliavsky and Mikhail Tal (both 9½/15), ahead of Rafael Vaganian and Lev Polugaevsky (both 9/15).
- The annual Las Palmas tournament results in a win for Ljubomir Ljubojević, whose tally is 11/15. He is a full point clear of second placed pair Alexander Beliavsky and Fridrik Olafsson, both having 10/15.
- There is a strong entry at Sochi, where Lev Polugaevsky triumphs at the 7th Chigorin Memorial, with a total of 11/15. Runner-up is Alexei Suetin (9/15). Polugaevsky continues the winning form he displayed earlier at Solingen, where he scored 10/14, taking the tie-break from Lubomir Kavalek (also 10/14) and finishing well ahead of Boris Spassky and Bojan Kurajica (tied third on 8½/14).
- Reykjavík is won by Vasily Smyslov with 12/14, ahead of Gyozo Forintos (11/14) and, tied in third place on 10½/14, Dragoljub Velimirovic and David Bronstein.
- Mikhail Tal wins at Halle in East Germany with 11½/15, ahead of Rainer Knaak (10½/15) and Jan Smejkal (10/15). He is also a winner at Lublin and Novi Sad.
- Vladimir Liberzon is victorious in Venice, taking first place with 9½/13, ahead of Vasily Smyslov (9/13) and Duncan Suttles (8½/13). A strong field includes rising stars Ulf Andersson and Jan Timman, as well as former USSR Champion Vladimir Savon.
- The Hastings International Chess Congress has another good turnout of overseas grandmasters. A four-way tie for first place occurs between László Szabó, Mikhail Tal, Jan Timman and Gennady Kuzmin (all 10/15).
- The 11th Capablanca Memorial Tournament is held in Camagüey, Cuba. Ulf Andersson wins with 11½/15, from Eduard Gufeld (11/15). Third place is shared between Evgeny Vasiukov and Rainer Knaak on 10/15.
- The first Pan-American Championship is held in Winnipeg. It is won by Walter Browne ahead of an otherwise weak field. Browne has an eventful and rewarding year, winning the U.S. Championship in Chicago for the first of six times, scoring further victories at Wijk aan Zee and Lone Pine, and narrowly losing out to Bent Larsen at the 2nd World Open in New York City.
- Jonathan Mestel wins the first ever World Cadet Championship, held in Pont-Sainte-Maxence in France. This is to become a regular and important event in the junior chess calendar and is a forerunner to the World Youth Festivals that expand to cover many more age categories.
- Bulgaria's great effort and high placing at the Olympiad is followed by an intensely competitive national championship. Held at Asenovgrad, the result is a tie between Nikola Padevsky and Ivan Radulov (both 10/15), ahead of Evgeny Ermenkov, just a half point off the pace.
- The 1st World Computer Chess Championship takes place in Stockholm. It is won by the program Kaissa (USSR), followed by Chess 4.0 (USA), which defeats third placed Ribbit (CAN) in a play-off for second. There are many interesting games and some surprising moves arise from tactical complications. The championship shows that chess computers are making rapid progress, although the quality of the endgame play is still very poor and poses no threat to human players of average strength.
- The People's Republic of China makes an application for membership of FIDE.
- The first chess book published in the United States by a major publisher using algebraic notation is printed.

== Births ==
- Gata Kamsky, Russian-American GM and world championship candidate - June 2
- Sergei Rublevsky, Russian GM and former national champion - October 15
- Konstantin Sakaev, Russian GM and former world youth champion - April 13
- Matthew Sadler, English GM and former British champion - May 5
- Sofia Polgar, Hungarian IM and WGM, middle sister of Zsuzsa and Judit - November 2
- Sergey Volkov, Russian GM and former Russian champion - February 7
- Igor Miladinović, Serbian GM and former world junior champion - January 25
- Wang Pin, Chinese WGM and many times national women's champion - December 11
- Qin Kanying, Chinese WGM and many times national women's champion - February 2
- Mohamad Al-Modiahki, GM from Qatar, first Arabic grandmaster - June 1
- Artur Kogan, Ukrainian-Israeli GM who has lived in many countries - January 29
- Roland Schmaltz, German GM and champion of speed chess - November 15
- Reefat Bin-Sattar, Bangladeshi GM, the country's third grandmaster - July 25
- Ziaur Rahman, Bangladeshi GM, the country's second grandmaster - May 1
- Maria Manakova, Russian born WGM and model, has lived in Serbia - March 1
- Ryan Palmer, Former Jamaican champion and coach living in the UK - January 23

== Deaths ==
- Rashid Nezhmetdinov, Soviet master, writer and virtuoso of chess combinations - June 3
- CHO'D Alexander, English IM, wartime codebreaker and former British champion - February 15
- Henri Grob, Swiss master, former national champion and noted correspondence player - July 5
- Josef Lokvenc, Austrian IM and former national champion of Germany and Austria - April 2
- Maurice Raizman, French master and many times the national champion - April 1
- Abram Khavin, Ukrainian master and former national champion - January 19
- Eugenio Szabados, Hungarian-Italian IM and former President of the Italian Federation - March 6
- Gottlieb Machate, German master and former Olympiad player - May 27
- Leon Stolzenberg, American master and leading correspondence player - October 25
