= Hastings International Chess Congress =

Annual chess tournament

The Hastings International Chess Congress is an annual chess tournament which takes place in Hastings, England, around the turn of the year. The main event is the Hastings Premier tournament, which was traditionally a 10 to 16 player round-robin tournament. In 2004/05 the tournament was played in a knock out format; while in 2005/06 and 2006/07 it was played using the Swiss system. Alongside the main event there is the Challengers tournament, which is open to all players. The winner of the Challengers event earns an invitation to the following year's Premier.

In addition to the annual international tournament at the Christmas Congress, Hastings has also hosted international tournaments at irregular intervals in its Summer Congress. The most celebrated of these is Hastings 1895, which featured two world champions and nearly all of the world's best players.

Every World Champion before Garry Kasparov except Bobby Fischer played at Hastings: Wilhelm Steinitz (1895), Emanuel Lasker (1895), José Raúl Capablanca (1919, 1929/30, 1930/1 and 1934/5), Alexander Alekhine (1922, 1925/6, 1933/4 and 1936/7), Max Euwe (1923/4, 1930/1, 1931/2, 1934/5, 1945/6 and 1949/50), Mikhail Botvinnik (1934/5, 1961/2 and 1966/7), Vasily Smyslov (1954/5, 1962/3 and 1968/9), Mikhail Tal (1963/4), Tigran Petrosian (1977/8), Boris Spassky (1965/6), and Anatoly Karpov (1971/2). The only champions to play Hastings while currently holding the title were Lasker at Hastings 1895, Alekhine at the 1933/4 Christmas Congress and Botvinnik in 1961/62.

Vera Menchik (Czechoslovakia), who was then the Women's World Champion, was the first woman to play in the Premier section, participating in seven tournaments from 1929/30 through 1936/37. In 1963/4 Nona Gaprindashvili (USSR) won the Challengers section when she also was Women's World Champion, earning a spot in the next years Premier. In the 1964/5 Premier she scored 5/9 to place fifth, beating all of the British masters in the tournament. Judit Polgár tied for first place in the 1992/3 Premier tournament.

The 2021/22 over-the-board edition of the Congress was cancelled due to the Coronavirus pandemic, and was instead staged as an arbited online event, won by David Howell.

The Hastings Variation of the Queen's Gambit Declined takes its name from the game Victor Berger (né Buerger) – George Alan Thomas, Hastings 1926/7, which began 1.d4 d5 2.c4 e6 3.Nf3 Nf6 4.Bg5 h6 5.Bxf6 Qxf6 6.Nc3 c6 7.Qb3.

== Premier (Christmas Congress) ==
=== History ===
The first Christmas Congress in 1920/1 was a four player double round-robin of British Champions, won by Frederick Yates 4/6 ahead of Roland Henry Vaughn Scott 3.5, Henry Ernest Atkins 3, and Richard Griffith 1.5.

In 1921/2, the second Congress, the field was still almost entirely British. The lone foreign entrant, Borislav Kostić (Yugoslavia), won with a perfect 7/7 score.

The third Congress in 1922/3, began the event as a truly international competition with four foreign participants in the field of ten. Max Euwe (Netherlands) won with 7.5/9. Except for 1924/5 and during World War II, the tournaments would continue as ten-player events with the field half British, half foreign. In 1968 the field was increased to twelve, and in 1971 it was increased again to sixteen.

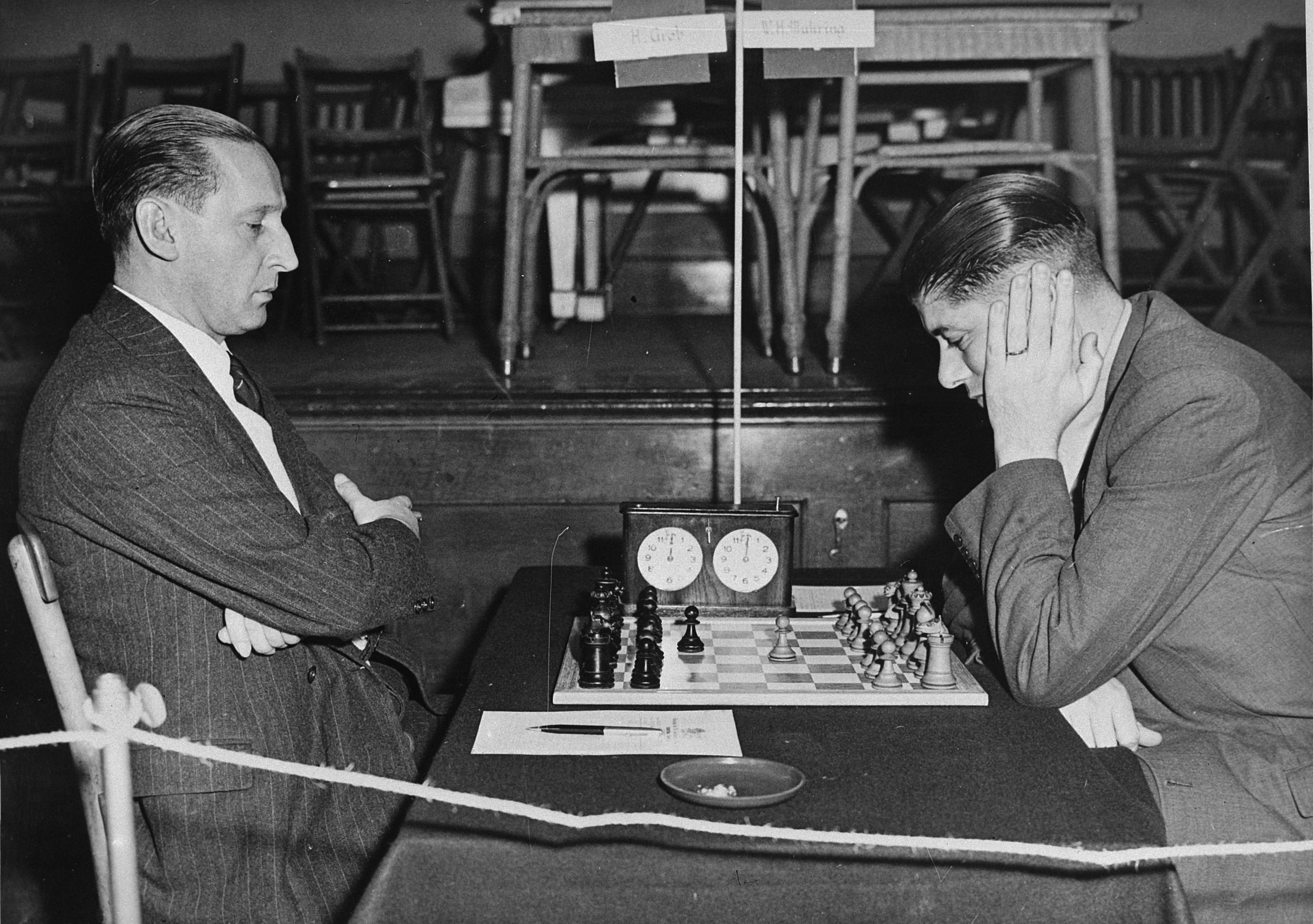
Henri Grob vs. Willem Mühring (Hastings, 1947–48)

The Congress was held in the Hastings Town Hall from 1921 to 1929. In 1930 it was held in the Waverly Hotel; from 1931 to 1953 at the White Rock Pavilion; from 1954 to 1965 at the Sun Lounge, St. Leonards-on-Sea; and in 1966 Falaise Hall, White Rock Gardens. At first the tournament was funded by private donations and a grant from the Hastings Corporation, but eventually commercial sponsorship became necessary. The 1967 to 1969 tournaments were sponsored by The Times newspaper and the St Leonards and Hastings Corporations. This allowed an increase in the prize funds for both the Premier and Challengers' sections, with the prizes for the Premier being 1st £250, 2nd £100, 3rd £50, 4th £25, and £5 per won game for non-prize winners. Challengers prizes were 1st £100, 2nd £50, 3rd £30, 4th £20, 5th £10, and a £20 prize for the best score by a British player. Participants in the by-invitation Premier section had expenses paid. The entry fee for the Challengers' section was £4, with the 32-player field selected from the entries received. Zetters International Pools was the sponsor in 1975, and Ladbrokes in 1976. Other sponsors included J. D. Slater, W. R. Morry, and the Friends of Chess.

The 1961/2 Congress featured World Champion Mikhail Botvinnik, making his first return to Hastings since 1934/5. The 1934/5 Congress was Botvinnik's first tournament outside the Soviet Union and he had finished a disappointing fifth behind Sir George Thomas, Max Euwe, and Salo Flohr tied for 1st-3rd, and Capablanca at 4th. This time Botvinnik was undefeated, winning seven and drawing two to finish first with 8/9. Svetozar Gligorić was second with 6, Flohr third with 5.5, and Arthur Bisguier and John Penrose tied for fourth-fifth with 5.

=== Winners ===
#	Year	Winner		
#	Year	Name	Rating	Score
1	1920/21	Frederick Yates (England)		
2	1921/22	Borislav Kostić (Yugoslavia)		
3	1922/23	Akiba Rubinstein (Poland)		
4	1923/24	Max Euwe (Netherlands)		
5	1924/25	Géza Maróczy (Hungary); Savielly Tartakower (Poland)		
6	1925/26	Alexander Alekhine (France); Milan Vidmar (Yugoslavia)		
7	1926/27	Savielly Tartakower (Poland)		
8	1927/28	Savielly Tartakower (Poland)		
9	1928/29	Edgard Colle (Belgium); Frank Marshall (USA); Sándor Takács (Hungary)		
10	1929/30	José Raúl Capablanca (Cuba)		
11	1930/31	Max Euwe (Netherlands)		
12	1931/32	Salo Flohr (Czechoslovakia)		
13	1932/33	Salo Flohr (Czechoslovakia)		
14	1933/34	Salo Flohr (Czechoslovakia)		
15	1934/35	Max Euwe (Netherlands); George Alan Thomas (England); Salo Flohr (Czechoslovakia)		
16	1935/36	Reuben Fine (USA)		
17	1936/37	Alexander Alekhine (France)		
18	1937/38	Samuel Reshevsky (USA)		
19	1938/39	László Szabó (Hungary)		
20	1939/40	Frank Parr (England)		
21	1945/46	Savielly Tartakower (France)		
22	1946/47	Conel Hugh O'Donel Alexander (England)		
23	1947/48	László Szabó (Hungary)		
24	1948/49	Nicolas Rossolimo (France)		
25	1949/50	László Szabó (Hungary)		
26	1950/51	Wolfgang Unzicker (West Germany)		
27	1951/52	Svetozar Gligorić (Yugoslavia)		
28	1952/53	Harry Golombek (England); Antonio Medina (Spain); Jonathan Penrose (England); Daniel Yanofsky (Canada)		
29	1953/54	Conel Hugh O'Donel Alexander (England); David Bronstein (USSR)		
30	1954/55	Paul Keres (USSR); Vasily Smyslov (USSR)		
31	1955/56	Viktor Korchnoi (USSR); Fridrik Olafsson (Iceland)		
32	1956/57	Svetozar Gligorić (Yugoslavia); Bent Larsen (Denmark)		
33	1957/58	Paul Keres (USSR)		
34	1958/59	Wolfgang Uhlmann (East Germany)		
35	1959/60	Svetozar Gligorić (Yugoslavia)		
36	1960/61	Svetozar Gligorić (Yugoslavia)		
37	1961/62	Mikhail Botvinnik (USSR)		
38	1962/63	Svetozar Gligorić (Yugoslavia); Alexander Kotov (USSR)		
39	1963/64	Mikhail Tal (USSR)		
40	1964/65	Paul Keres (USSR)		
41	1965/66	Boris Spassky (USSR); Wolfgang Uhlmann (East Germany)		
42	1966/67	Mikhail Botvinnik (USSR)		
43	1967/68	Florin Gheorghiu (Romania); Vlastimil Hort (Czechoslovakia); Leonid Stein (USSR); Alexey Suetin (USSR)		
44	1968/69	Vasily Smyslov (USSR)		
45	1969/70	Lajos Portisch (Hungary)		
46	1970/71	Lajos Portisch (Hungary)		
47	1971/72	Anatoly Karpov (USSR); Viktor Korchnoi (USSR)		
48	1972/73	Bent Larsen (Denmark)		
49	1973/74	Gennady Kuzmin (USSR); László Szabó (Hungary); Mikhail Tal (USSR); Jan Timman (Netherlands)		
50	1974/75	Vlastimil Hort (Czechoslovakia)		
51	1975/76	David Bronstein (USSR); Vlastimil Hort (Czechoslovakia); Wolfgang Uhlmann (East Germany)		
52	1976/77	Oleg Romanishin (USSR)		
53	1977/78	Roman Dzindzichashvili (Israel)		
54	1978/79	Ulf Andersson (Sweden)		
55	1979/80	Ulf Andersson (Sweden); John Nunn (England)		
56	1980/81	Ulf Andersson (Sweden)		
57	1981/82	Viktor Kupreichik (USSR)		
58	1982/83	Rafael Vaganian (USSR)		
59	1983/84	Lars Karlsson (Sweden); Jonathan Speelman (England)		
60	1984/85	Evgeny Sveshnikov (USSR)		
61	1985/86	Margeir Petursson (Iceland)		
62	1986/87	Murray Chandler (England); Bent Larsen (Denmark); Smbat Lputian (USSR); Jonathan Speelman (England)		
63	1987/88	Nigel Short (England)		
64	1988/89	Nigel Short (England)		
65	1989/90	Sergey Dolmatov (USSR)		
66	1990/91	Evgeny Bareev (USSR)		
67	1991/92	Evgeny Bareev (Russia)		
68	1992/93	Judit Polgár (Hungary); Evgeny Bareev (Russia)		
69	1993/94	John Nunn (England)		
70	1994/95	Thomas Luther (Germany)		
71	1995/96	Stuart Conquest (England); Alexander Khalifman (Russia); Bogdan Lalić (Croatia)		
72	1996/97	Mark Hebden (England); John Nunn (England); Eduardas Rozentalis (Lithuania)		
73	1997/98	Matthew Sadler (England)		
74	1998/99	Ivan Sokolov (Bosnia and Herzegovina)		
75	1999/00	Emil Sutovsky (Israel)		
76	2000/01	Stuart Conquest (England); Krishnan Sasikiran (India)		
77	2001/02	Alexei Barsov (Uzbekistan); Pentala Harikrishna (India); Krishnan Sasikiran (India)		
78	2002/03	Peter Heine Nielsen (Denmark)		
79	2003/04	Vasilios Kotronias (Greece); Jonathan Rowson (Scotland)		
80	2004/05	Vladimir Belov (Russia)		
81	2005/06	Valeriy Neverov (Ukraine)		
82	2006/07	Merab Gagunashvili (Georgia); Valeriy Neverov (Ukraine)		
83	2007/08	Vadim Malakhatko (Belgium); Nidjat Mamedov (Azerbaijan); Valeriy Neverov (Ukraine)		
84	2008/09	Igor Kurnosov (Russia)		
85	2009/10	Andrei Istrățescu (Romania); Romain Edouard (France); David Howell (England); Mark Hebden (England)	2624; 2620; 2597; 2522	
86	2010/11	Deep Sengupta (India); Arghyadip Das (India)	2558; 2476	
87	2011/12	Wang Yue (China)	2697	7.5/9
88	2012/13	Gawain Jones (England)	2644	7.5/10
89	2013/14	Mikheil Mchedlishvili (Georgia); Igor Khenkin (Germany); Ma Qun (China); Mark Hebden (England); Jahongir Vakhidov (Uzbekistan); Justin Sarkar (USA); Jovica Radovanovic (Serbia)	2649; 2598; 2595; 2560; 2452; 2425; 2339	6.5/9
90	2014/15	Zhao Jun (China)	2585	8.0/9
91	2015/16	Jahongir Vakhidov (Uzbekistan); Aleksander Mista (Poland)	2546; 2567	7.0/9
92	2016/17	Deep Sengupta (India)	2575	7.0/9
93	2017/18	Deep Sengupta (India); Lou Yiping (China)	2586; 2462	7.0/9
94	2018/19	Oleg Korneev (Spain); Sarunas Sulskis (Lithuania); Daniel Gormally (England); Martin Petrov (Bulgaria); Alexander Cherniaev (Russia); Conor Murphy (Ireland)	2550; 2525; 2478; 2472; 2393; 2331	7.0/10
95	2019/20	Magesh Panchanathan (India)	2482	7.5/9
96	2020/21	David Howell (England)	2663	9/11
97	2022/23	Sarunas Sulskis (Lithuania)	2492	8/10
98	2023/24	Abhijeet Gupta (India)	2596	
99	2024/25	Xue Haowen (China)	2502	7/9
100	2025/26	Alexander Kovchan (Ukraine); Alex Golding (England)	2441; 2370	7/9

== Summer Congress ==
#	Year	Winner
1	1895	Harry Nelson Pillsbury (USA)
2	1919	José Raúl Capablanca (Cuba)
3	1922	Alexander Alekhine (France)
4	1995	Suat Atalık (Turkey)

Hastings 1895 is considered one of the greatest tournaments in the history of chess. It was one of the first tournaments to include all the top players, including former World Champion Wilhelm Steinitz and current champion Emanuel Lasker, Mikhail Chigorin, Siegbert Tarrasch, Karl Schlechter, Joseph Henry Blackburne, David Janowski, and others. The result of the 22-game round-robin was a surprise, as American Harry Nelson Pillsbury won with 16.5 points despite playing in his first international tournament.

The Hastings 1919 "Victory Tournament" was the first international tournament held in an allied country after World War I. The field was chiefly British, but the tournament was dominated by Cuban José Raúl Capablanca (soon to be World Champion) and Yugoslav grandmaster Borislav Kostić. Capablanca won 10.5/11 without a loss, drawing only his game to Kostić who placed second with 9.5. George Alan Thomas and Frederick Yates tied for 3rd-4th with 7 points.

Hastings 1922 was a double round-robin with Alexander Alekhine, Akiba Rubinstein, Efim Bogoljubov, Siegbert Tarrasch, George Alan Thomas, and Frederick Yates. Capablanca and Lasker had been invited but were unable to attend. The tournament featured a slower time control than had been usual in England—17 moves per hour instead of 20 moves per hour. The outcome wasn't decided until the final round. Bogoljubov lost all his games against tournament leaders Alekhine and Rubinstein. Rubinstein needed a final round victory over Thomas to tie for first with Alekhine, but achieved only a draw to fall a half point short. Alekhine won with 7.5, Rubinstein was second with 7, and Bogoljubow and Thomas tied for third-fourth with 4.5.
