= Twan Burg =

Dutch chess grandmaster and solver (born 1990)

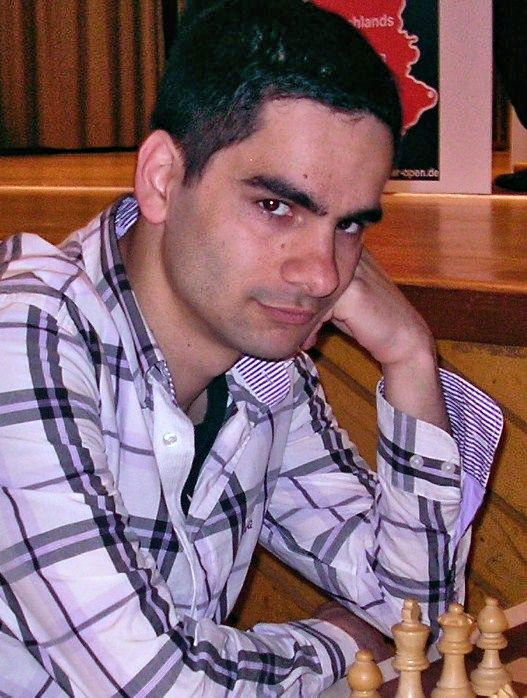
- Burg in 2011

Personal information
- Born: April 2, 1990 (age 36) Schijndel, Netherlands
- Spouse: Nargiz Umudova (m. 2016)

Chess career
- Country: Netherlands
- Title: Grandmaster (2015)
- FIDE rating: 2493 (September 2026)
- Peak rating: 2536 (November 2019)

Twan Burg is a Dutch chess grandmaster and solver.

== Chess career ==
In January 2013, Burg participated in the Tata Steel Chess Tournament, finishing sixth in Group C. He won against Igor Bitensky, Oleg Romanishin, Mark van der Werf, and Lisa Schut.

Burg won the 2009, 2016, 2017 editions of the ARVES Chess Solving contest.

In October 2018, he held David Howell to a draw for his team in the European Chess Club Cup.

Burg won the 2021 and 2022 editions of the Dutch Chess Solving Championship.

== Personal life ==
In 2016, Burg married Azerbaijani Woman Grandmaster Nargiz Umudova.
