= Justin Sarkar =

American chess player (born 1981)

Personal information
- Born: May 24, 1981 (age 45) New Rochelle, New York

Chess career
- Country: United States
- Title: International Master (2001)
- Peak rating: 2455 (January 2009)

Justin Sarkar is an American chess player.

== Chess career ==
He was the New York State Champion in 2008/2009 alongside Aleksandr Lenderman.

In January 2013, he gave a talk on chess and autism and held a simul at the 3rd annual Chess Benefit at Cold Spring Harbor Laboratory, where he won 3 games and drew the other.

In January 2014, he tied for first place at the 89th Hastings International Chess Congress with Mikheil Mchedlishvili (the eventual winner on tiebreak score), Igor Khenkin, Mark Hebden, Jahongir Vakhidov, Ma Qun, and Jovica Radovanovic, placing sixth on countback.

In May 2015, he earned his third and final GM norm at the UTB May GM norm round robin, notably defeating grandmaster Holden Hernández Carmenate. However, he did not surpass the 2500 rating mark needed to be awarded the Grandmaster title.

In December 2024, he won the Monthly Marshall FIDE Premier 2024, winning all of his games, including one against Jay Bonin.

== Personal life ==
He studied applied mathematics at Columbia University.
