= Tata Steel Chess Tournament 2013 =

Chess tournament 2013

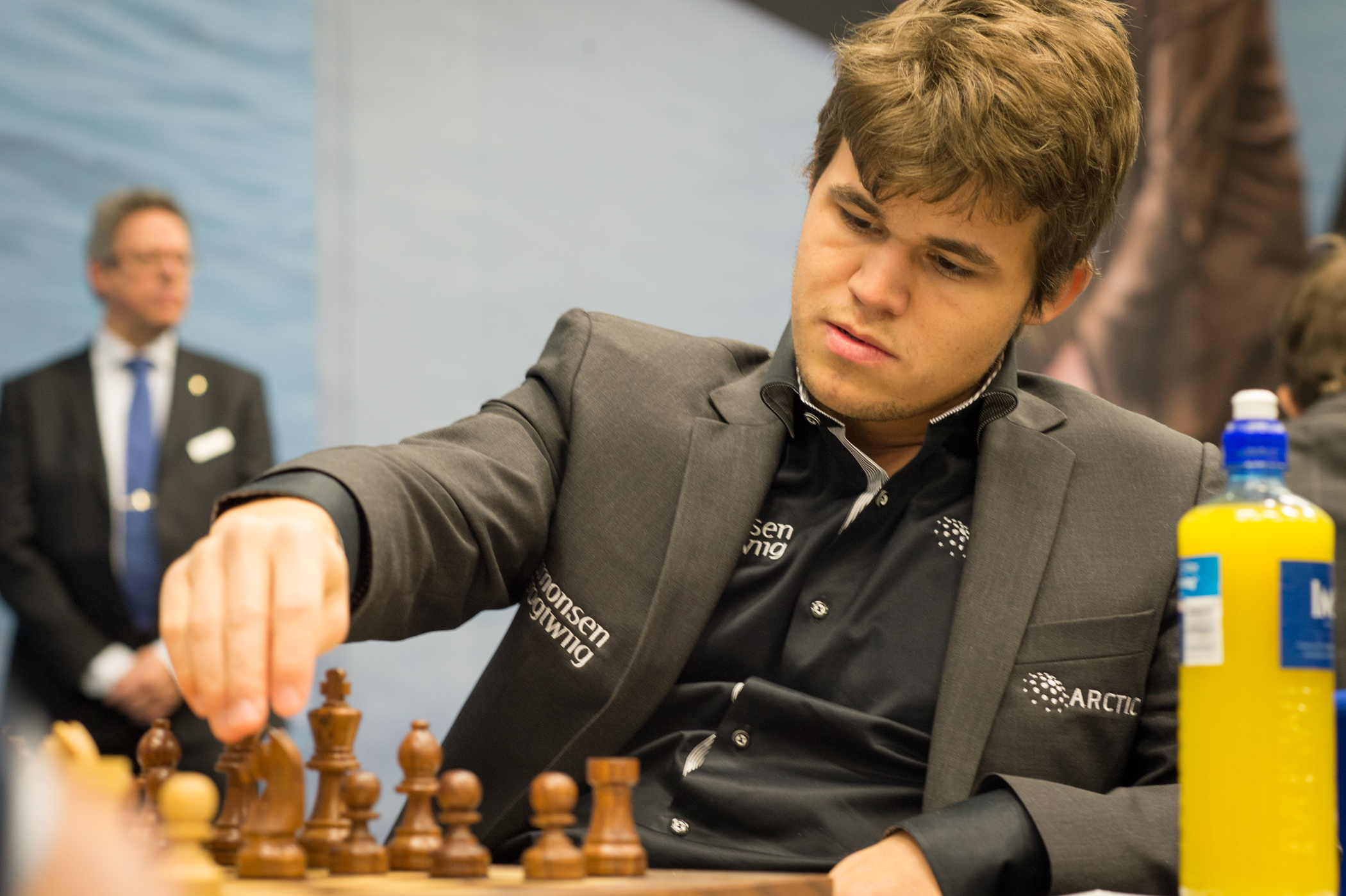
- Magnus Carlsen, pictured at the 2013 event
- Location: Wijk aan Zee, Netherlands
- Dates: 12–27 January 2013
- Competitors: 42
- Winning score: 10 points of 13

Champion
- (Norway) Magnus Carlsen

The Tata Steel Chess Tournament 2013 was the 75th edition of the Tata Steel Chess Tournament. Previously known as the Corus Chess Tournament, it was renamed after Tata Steel, which purchased the Corus Group. It was held in Wijk aan Zee from 12 to 27 January 2013.

The tournament was won by Magnus Carlsen for the third time. Carlsen finished on 10/13, matching Garry Kasparov's best score in the event, set in 1999.

75th Tata Steel Chess, grandmaster group A, 12–27 January 2013, Wijk aan Zee, Cat. XX (2732)
	Player	Rating	1	2	3	4	5	6	7	8	9	10	11	12	13	14	Total	SB	TPR
1	Magnus Carlsen (Norway)	2861		½	½	1	½	1	1	½	½	1	1	½	1	1	10		2933
2	Levon Aronian (Armenia)	2802	½		0	½	1	1	½	½	1	½	1	½	½	1	8½		2837
3	Viswanathan Anand (India)	2772	½	1		½	½	½	½	½	0	1	½	1	1	½	8	50.25	2816
4	Sergey Karjakin (Russia)	2780	0	½	½		½	½	½	½	1	1	1	½	½	1	8	46.75	2816
5	Peter Leko (Hungary)	2735	½	0	½	½		½	½	½	½	1	½	1	½	1	7½		2789
6	Hikaru Nakamura (United States)	2769	0	0	½	½	½		½	½	1	½	1	1	½	½	7		2758
7	Pentala Harikrishna (India)	2698	0	½	½	½	½	½		1	½	1	0	½	½	½	6½		2735
8	Anish Giri (Netherlands)	2726	½	½	½	½	½	½	0		½	½	0	1	½	½	6	39.00	2704
9	Wang Hao (China)	2752	½	0	1	0	½	0	½	½		0	1	½	1	½	6	36.50	2702
10	Loek van Wely (Netherlands)	2679	0	½	0	0	0	½	0	½	1		½	1	1	1	6	31.50	2707
11	Hou Yifan (China)	2603	0	0	½	0	½	0	1	1	0	½		½	½	1	5½		2685
12	Fabiano Caruana (Italy)	2781	½	½	0	½	0	0	½	0	½	0	½		1	1	5		2642
13	Erwin l'Ami (Netherlands)	2627	0	½	0	½	½	½	½	½	0	0	½	0		½	4		2599
14	Ivan Sokolov (Netherlands)	2667	0	0	½	0	0	½	½	½	½	0	0	0	½		3		2526

75th Tata Steel Chess, grandmaster group B, 12–27 January 2013, Wijk aan Zee, Cat. XV (2620)
	Player	Rating	1	2	3	4	5	6	7	8	9	10	11	12	13	14	Total	SB	TPR
1	GM Arkadij Naiditsch (Germany)	2708		1	1	½	½	½	1	0	1	0	1	½	1	1	9	56.25	2755
2	GM Richárd Rapport (Hungary)	2621	0		0	1	½	1	1	1	½	½	½	1	1	1	9	52.75	2761
3	GM Jan Smeets (Netherlands)	2615	0	1		½	½	1	0	½	1	½	1	1	½	1	8½	50.50	2731
4	GM Sergei Movsesian (Armenia)	2688	½	0	½		½	1	½	½	1	1	½	1	½	1	8½	46.75	2725
5	GM Daniil Dubov (Russia)	2600	½	½	½	½		0	1	1	0	½	½	1	½	1	7½		2679
6	GM Romain Édouard (France)	2686	½	0	0	0	1		½	1	½	1	1	½	1	0	7	41.25	2644
7	GM Jan Timman (Netherlands)	2566	0	0	1	½	0	½		½	½	0	1	1	1	1	7	39.00	2653
8	GM Sergei Tiviakov (Netherlands)	2655	1	0	½	½	0	0	½		½	1	½	1	1	0	6½		2618
9	GM Maxim Turov (Russia)	2630	0	½	0	0	1	½	½	½		½	½	½	½	1	6		2591
10	GM Robin van Kampen (Netherlands)	2581	1	½	½	0	½	0	1	0	½		0	0	½	1	5½		2566
11	GM Nils Grandelius (Sweden)	2572	0	½	0	½	½	0	0	½	½	1		0	1	0	4½	28.25	2514
12	GM Predrag Nikolić (Bosnia and Herzegovina)	2619	½	0	0	0	0	½	0	0	½	1	1		0	1	4½	24.50	2510
13	GM Alexander Ipatov (Turkey)	2587	0	0	½	½	½	0	0	0	½	½	0	1		½	4		2482
14	GM Sipke Ernst (Netherlands)	2556	0	0	0	0	0	1	0	1	0	0	1	0	½		3½		2450

75th Tata Steel Chess, grandmaster group C, 12–27 January 2013, Wijk aan Zee, Cat. X (2476)
	Player	Rating	1	2	3	4	5	6	7	8	9	10	11	12	13	14	Total	SB	TPR
1	GM Sabino Brunello (Italy)	2572		½	½	1	1	½	1	1	½	1	1	1	1	1	11		2764
2	GM Fernando Peralta (Argentina)	2617	½		1	½	½	½	1	1	1	1	1	1	½	1	10½		2716
3	GM Robin Swinkels (Netherlands)	2508	½	0		½	½	1	1	½	½	½	½	1	1	1	8½		2583
4	GM Krikor Mekhitarian (Brazil)	2543	0	½	½		½	1	0	1	0	½	1	1	1	1	8		2558
5	GM Alexander Kovchan (Ukraine)	2579	0	½	½	½		½	½	½	1	½	½	1	½	1	7½		2525
6	IM Twan Burg (Netherlands)	2492	½	½	0	0	½		½	0	1	1	½	½	1	1	7	39.00	2504
7	IM David Klein (Netherlands)	2445	0	0	0	1	½	½		1	0	1	0	1	1	1	7	36.75	2507
8	IM Hjörvar Steinn Grétarsson (Iceland)	2516	0	0	½	0	½	1	0		1	1	½	½	½	1	6½		2473
9	IM Igor Bitensky (Israel)	2400	½	0	½	1	0	0	1	0		½	½	1	½	0	5½	34.75	2425
10	GM Oleg Romanishin (Ukraine)	2521	0	0	½	½	½	0	0	0	½		1	½	1	1	5½	27.00	2415
11	FM Miguoel Admiraal (Netherlands)	2321	0	0	½	0	½	½	1	½	½	0		0	½	½	4½		2378
12	WGM Aleksandra Goryachkina (Russia)	2402	0	0	0	0	0	½	0	½	0	½	1		½	½	3½		2306
13	IM Mark van der Werf (Netherlands)	2450	0	½	0	0	½	0	0	½	½	0	½	½		0	3	19.00	2267
14	WIM Lisa Schut (Netherlands)	2295	0	0	0	0	0	0	0	0	1	0	½	½	1		3	12.50	2279
