= Ma Qun =

Chinese chess grandmaster (born 1991)

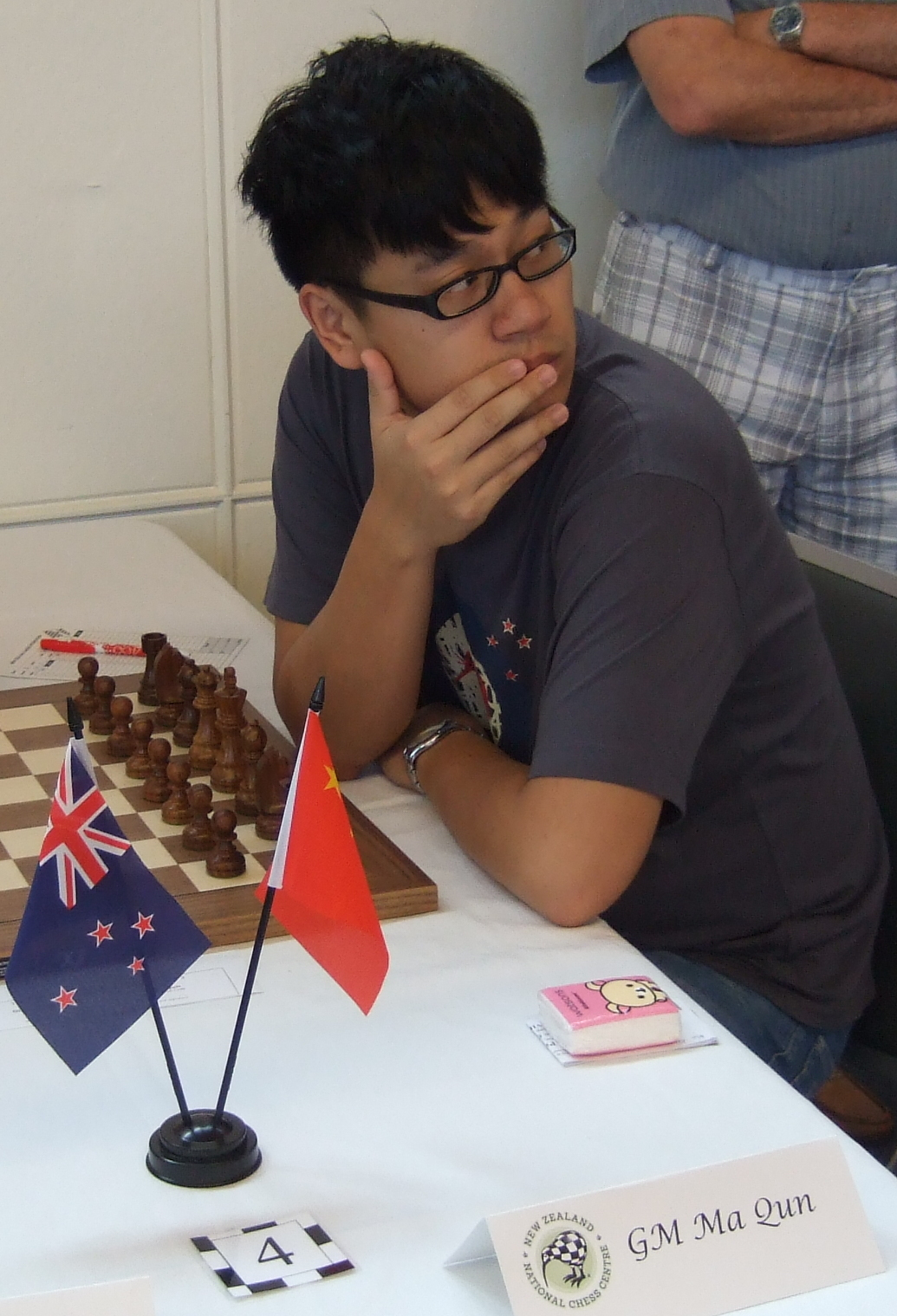
- Ma Qun at the New Zealand Chess Congress 2016

Personal information
- Born: November 9, 1991 (age 34) Shandong, China

Chess career
- Country: China
- Title: Grandmaster (2013)
- FIDE rating: 2611 (July 2026)
- Peak rating: 2666 (May 2022)
- Peak ranking: No. 75 (May 2022)

Ma Qun (Chinese: 马群; pinyin: Mǎ Qún, born November 9, 1991) is a Chinese chess grandmaster. He was awarded the title Grandmaster (GM) by FIDE in 2013. Ma played for the gold medal-winning Chinese team in the Asian Nations Cup 2014 in Tabriz, Iran and also earned the individual gold medal on board 4 thanks to a score of 7/7 points, namely winning all seven games he played.

Ma Qun tied for first place at the 89th Hastings International Chess Congress in January 2014 with Mikheil Mchedlishvili (the eventual winner on tiebreak score), Igor Khenkin, Mark Hebden, Jahongir Vakhidov, Justin Sarkar, and Jovica Radovanovic, placing third on countback.

In 2015 he won the silver medal at the 1st Asian University Chess Championship in Beijing.

In January 2016, he shared second place with Ju Wenjun and Nigel Short in the New Zealand Open, which took place in Devonport, New Zealand. Later in the same year, Ma won the International Open of Sants, Hostafrancs and La Bordeta in Barcelona, after playoffs.

In 2019, he won the Chinese Rapid Championship.
