= Tata Steel Chess Tournament 2011 =

Chess tournament 2011

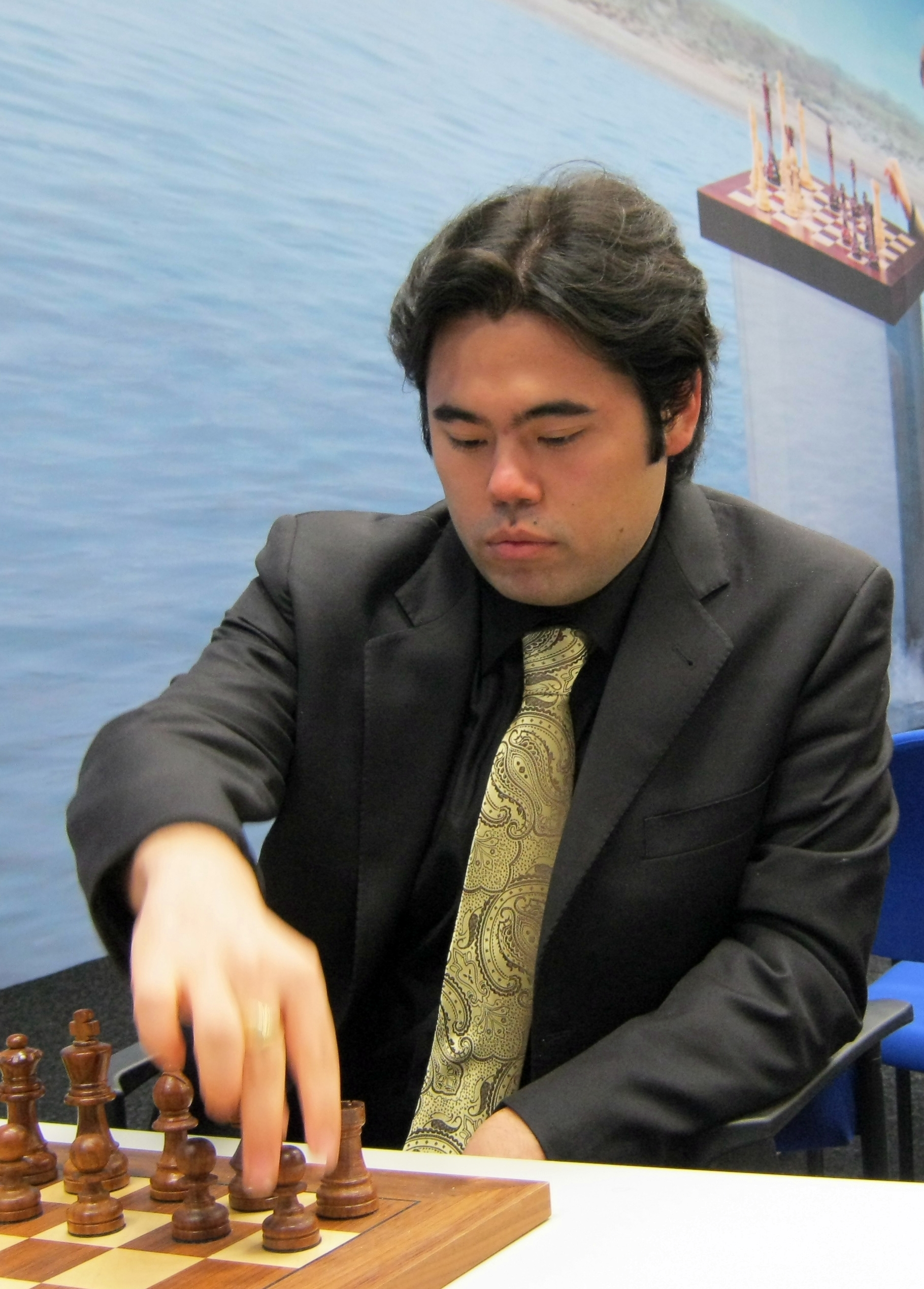
- Hikaru Nakamura, pictured at the 2012 event
- Location: Wijk aan Zee, Netherlands
- Dates: 15–30 January 2011
- Competitors: 28
- Winning score: 9 points of 13

Champion
- (United States) Hikaru Nakamura

The Tata Steel Chess Tournament 2011 was the 73rd edition of the Tata Steel Chess Tournament. Known until 2010 as the Corus Chess Tournament, it was renamed after Tata Steel, which purchased the Corus Group. It was held in Wijk aan Zee from 15 to 30 January 2011.

The tournament was won by Hikaru Nakamura, his first win in a super-tournament, and the best result by an American chess player since the days of Bobby Fischer.

73rd Tata Steel Chess, grandmaster group A, 15–30 January 2011, Wijk aan Zee, Cat. XX (2740)
	Player	Rating	1	2	3	4	5	6	7	8	9	10	11	12	13	14	Total	SB	TPR
1	Hikaru Nakamura (United States)	2751		½	0	½	½	1	½	½	1	½	1	1	1	1	9		2880
2	Viswanathan Anand (India)	2814	½		½	½	½	½	½	1	½	1	½	½	1	1	8½		2844
3	Magnus Carlsen (Norway)	2814	1	½		½	1	½	0	½	0	1	½	1	1	½	8	51.00	2821
4	Levon Aronian (Armenia)	2805	½	½	½		½	½	½	½	1	½	1	½	½	1	8	48.75	2822
5	Vladimir Kramnik (Russia)	2784	½	½	0	½		½	1	½	½	½	½	1	½	1	7½	45.25	2793
6	Maxime Vachier-Lagrave (France)	2715	0	½	½	½	½		½	½	1	½	½	½	1	1	7½	44.50	2799
7	Anish Giri (Netherlands)	2686	½	½	1	½	0	½		½	0	1	½	½	½	½	6½	42.50	2744
8	Ruslan Ponomariov (Ukraine)	2744	½	0	½	½	½	½	½		½	0	1	½	1	½	6½	39.50	2740
9	Ian Nepomniachtchi (Russia)	2733	0	½	1	0	½	0	1	½		1	½	0	½	½	6	38.25	2711
10	Wang Hao (China)	2731	½	0	0	½	½	½	0	1	0		1	1	½	½	6	35.75	2712
11	Alexander Grischuk (Russia)	2773	0	½	½	0	½	½	½	0	½	0		½	1	0	4½	28.75	2627
12	Erwin l'Ami (Netherlands)	2628	0	½	0	½	0	½	½	½	½	0	½		½	½	4½	28.00	2638
13	Jan Smeets (Netherlands)	2662	0	0	0	½	½	0	½	0	1	½	0	½		1	4½	26.25	2636
14	Alexei Shirov (Spain)	2722	0	0	½	0	0	0	½	½	½	½	1	½	0		4		2600

73rd Tata Steel Chess, grandmaster group B, 15–30 January 2011, Wijk aan Zee, Cat. XVII (2659)
	Player	Rating	1	2	3	4	5	6	7	8	9	10	11	12	13	14	Total	SB	TPR
1	GM Luke McShane (England)	2664		½	0	0	1	½	1	1	1	½	1	1	½	½	8½	52.25	2768
2	GM David Navara (Czech Republic)	2708	½		0	½	0	½	1	1	1	½	1	1	½	1	8½	50.25	2765
3	GM Zahar Efimenko (Ukraine)	2701	1	1		½	½	½	0	½	½	½	½	1	1	½	8		2743
4	GM Lê Quang Liêm (Vietnam)	2664	1	½	½		½	1	½	0	0	1	½	0	1	1	7½	47.75	2715
5	GM Wesley So (Philippines)	2673	0	1	½	½		½	½	½	0	1	1	1	½	½	7½	47.00	2715
6	GM Gabriel Sargissian (Armenia)	2667	½	½	½	0	½		½	1	½	½	1	½	½	1	7½	45.75	2715
7	GM Vladislav Tkachiev (France)	2636	0	0	1	½	½	½		½	0	½	1	1	1	½	7		2690
8	GM Radosław Wojtaszek (Poland)	2726	0	0	½	1	½	0	½		1	1	0	½	½	1	6½		2654
9	GM Li Chao (China)	2649	0	0	½	1	1	½	1	0		0	½	0	1	½	6	38.25	2631
10	GM Laurent Fressinet (France)	2707	½	½	½	0	0	½	½	0	1		1	0	1	½	6	37.00	2626
11	GM Surya Shekhar Ganguly (India)	2651	0	0	½	½	0	0	0	1	½	0		1	1	1	5½		2602
12	GM Wouter Spoelman (Netherlands)	2547	0	0	0	1	0	½	0	½	1	1	0		0	1	5		2580
13	GM Jon Ludvig Hammer (Norway)	2647	½	½	0	0	½	½	0	½	0	0	0	1		½	4		2519
14	GM Friso Nijboer (Netherlands)	2584	½	0	½	0	½	0	½	0	½	½	0	0	½		3½		2490

73rd Tata Steel Chess, grandmaster group C, 15–30 January 2011, Wijk aan Zee, Cat. XI (2507)
	Player	Rating	1	2	3	4	5	6	7	8	9	10	11	12	13	14	Total	SB	TPR
1	GM Daniele Vocaturo (Italy)	2570		½	1	0	0	1	1	½	0	1	1	1	1	1	9		2643
2	IM Illia Nyzhnyk (Ukraine)	2530	½		½	0	0	½	1	1	1	1	½	1	1	½	8½		2615
3	GM Kateryna Lagno (Ukraine)	2518	0	½		½	½	½	½	1	1	1	0	½	1	1	8		2593
4	GM Ivan Ivanišević (Serbia)	2630	1	1	½		½	0	½	1	0	½	½	½	½	1	7½	48.75	2555
5	GM Dariusz Świercz (Poland)	2540	1	1	½	½		0	½	0	0	1	0	1	1	1	7½	46.75	2562
6	GM Mark Bluvshtein (Canada)	2590	0	½	½	1	1		0	0	1	1	½	1	0	1	7½	46.25	2558
7	GM Murtas Kazhgaleyev (Kazakhstan)	2637	0	0	½	½	½	1		0	1	0	1	1	½	1	7		2526
8	IM Benjamin Bok (Netherlands)	2453	½	0	0	0	1	1	1		½	½	½	½	1	0	6½	41.25	2511
9	IM Tania Sachdev (India)	2391	1	0	0	1	1	0	0	½		0	1	½	½	1	6½	30.50	2516
10	GM Sebastian Siebrecht (Germany)	2439	0	0	0	½	0	0	1	½	1		1	1	½	0	5½		2455
11	IM Mark van der Werf (Netherlands)	2439	0	½	1	½	1	½	0	½	0	0		0	1	0	5		2425
12	IM Robin van Kampen (Netherlands)	2443	0	0	½	½	0	0	0	½	½	0	1		½	1	4½		2402
13	IM Roeland Pruijssers (Netherlands)	2484	0	0	0	½	0	1	½	0	½	½	0	½		½	4	25.00	2368
14	IM Jan Willem de Jong (Netherlands)	2437	0	½	0	0	0	0	0	1	0	1	1	0	½		4	23.25	2372
