= Jovica Radovanovic =

Serbian chess player (born 1969)

Personal information
- Born: September 23, 1969 (age 56)

Chess career
- Country: Serbia
- Title: FIDE Master (2005)
- Peak rating: 2376 (January 2006)

Jovica Radovanovic is a Serbian chess player.

== Chess career ==
In August 2008, he achieved his final IM norm after finishing in second place at the Jessie Gilbert Celebration International, though did not meet the rating requirement for the title.

In January 2014, he tied for first place at the 89th Hastings International Chess Congress with Mikheil Mchedlishvili (the eventual winner on tiebreak score), Igor Khenkin, Mark Hebden, Jahongir Vakhidov, Ma Qun, and Justin Sarkar, placing seventh on countback.

In July 2019, he tied for first place with Gavin Wall in the Kingston Rapidplay, both finishing with 5/6.
