= Corus Chess Tournament 2005 =

Chess tournament in the Netherlands

- Venue: Wijk aan Zee

The Corus Chess Tournament 2005 was the 67th edition of the Corus Chess Tournament. It was held in Wijk aan Zee in January 2005 and was won by Peter Leko.

67th Corus Chess Tournament, grandmaster group A, 15–30 January 2005, Wijk aan Zee, Cat. XIX (2721)
	Player	Rating	1	2	3	4	5	6	7	8	9	10	11	12	13	14	Total	SB	TPR
1	Peter Leko (Hungary)	2749		1	½	½	½	½	½	½	½	1	1	1	½	½	8½		2829
2	Viswanathan Anand (India)	2786	0		½	½	½	1	½	½	1	1	½	½	1	½	8		2803
3	Veselin Topalov (Bulgaria)	2757	½	½		0	½	0	1	½	1	1	½	1	½	½	7½		2775
4	Judit Polgár (Hungary)	2728	½	½	1		½	½	½	½	0	½	1	½	0	1	7	45.00	2749
5	Alexander Grischuk (Russia)	2710	½	½	½	½		½	½	½	1	½	0	½	1	½	7	44.50	2751
6	Michael Adams (England)	2741	½	0	1	½	½		½	½	½	½	½	½	1	½	7	44.00	2748
7	Vladimir Kramnik (Russia)	2754	½	½	0	½	½	½		½	½	½	1	½	½	1	7	43.00	2747
8	Loek van Wely (Netherlands)	2679	½	½	½	½	½	½	½		½	½	0	1	½	½	6½	42.00	2724
9	Ruslan Ponomariov (Ukraine)	2700	½	0	0	1	0	½	½	½		½	½	½	1	1	6½	38.50	2722
10	Lázaro Bruzón (Cuba)	2652	0	0	0	½	½	½	½	½	½		½	1	1	1	6½	37.00	2726
11	Peter Svidler (Russia)	2735	0	½	½	0	1	½	0	1	½	½		½	½	½	6		2691
12	Nigel Short (England)	2674	0	½	0	½	½	½	½	0	½	0	½		1	1	5½		2667
13	Alexander Morozevich (Russia)	2741	½	0	½	1	0	0	½	½	0	0	½	0		1	4½		2609
14	Ivan Sokolov (Netherlands)	2685	½	½	½	0	½	½	0	½	0	0	½	0	0		3½		2549

67th Corus Chess Tournament, grandmaster group B, 15–30 January 2005, Wijk aan Zee, Cat. XIII (2564)
	Player	Rating	1	2	3	4	5	6	7	8	9	10	11	12	13	14	Total	SB	TPR
1	GM Sergey Karjakin (Ukraine)	2599		½	½	0	1	½	½	1	½	1	1	1	1	1	9½		2737
2	GM Jan Smeets (Netherlands)	2475	½		1	0	½	½	1	½	1	½	1	½	½	1	8½	52.00	2681
3	GM Shakhriyar Mamedyarov (Azerbaijan)	2657	½	0		½	0	½	½	½	1	1	1	1	1	1	8½	47.25	2667
4	GM Peter Heine Nielsen (Denmark)	2648	1	1	½		0	½	½	1	½	½	1	½	½	½	8		2645
5	GM Ivan Cheparinov (Bulgaria)	2572	0	½	1	1		½	0	½	1	½	½	1	½	½	7½	47.00	2621
6	GM Alexander Onischuk (United States)	2652	½	½	½	½	½		½	1	½	0	½	1	½	1	7½	46.00	2615
7	GM Magnus Carlsen (Norway)	2553	½	0	½	½	1	½		½	½	1	½	0	1	½	7		2594
8	GM Daniël Stellwagen (Netherlands)	2524	0	½	½	0	½	0	½		½	1	1	½	1	½	6½		2568
9	GM Antoaneta Stefanova (Bulgaria)	2491	½	0	0	½	0	½	½	½		½	1	0	1	1	6		2541
10	GM Alexandra Kosteniuk (Russia)	2490	0	½	0	½	½	1	0	0	½		½	½	½	1	5½		2513
11	IM Sipke Ernst (Netherlands)	2509	0	0	0	0	½	½	½	0	0	½		1	1	1	5		2482
12	GM Friso Nijboer (Netherlands)	2549	0	½	0	½	0	0	1	½	1	½	0		0	½	4½		2456
13	GM Predrag Nikolić (Bosnia and Herzegovina)	2676	0	½	0	½	½	½	0	0	0	½	0	1		½	4		2415
14	GM Alejandro Ramírez (Costa Rica)	2507	0	0	0	½	½	0	½	½	0	0	0	½	½		3		2358

67th Corus Chess Tournament, grandmaster group C, 15–30 January 2005, Wijk aan Zee, Cat. VII (2422)
	Player	Rating	1	2	3	4	5	6	7	8	9	10	11	12	13	14	Total	SB	TPR
1	GM Vladimir Georgiev (Macedonia)	2517		½	½	1	½	½	1	1	1	1	1	1	½	1	10½		2665
2	GM Alexey Korotylev (Russia)	2603	½		1	0	½	½	1	1	½	1	1	1	1	1	10	56.50	2619
3	WGM Natalia Zhukova (Ukraine)	2465	½	0		½	½	1	½	1	1	1	1	1	1	1	10	53.50	2629
4	IM Erwin l'Ami (Netherlands)	2531	0	1	½		½	1	1	1	½	½	1	1	0	1	9	53.50	2554
5	GM Evgeny Alekseev (Russia)	2605	½	½	½	½		1	1	1	0	½	1	1	1	½	9	53.50	2548
6	GM Harmen Jonkman (Netherlands)	2399	½	½	0	0	0		0	0	1	1	1	½	1	1	6½	32.25	2423
7	Wouter Spoelman (Netherlands)	2381	0	0	½	0	0	1		½	½	1	0	1	1	1	6½	31.75	2425
8	Parimarjan Negi (India)	2316	0	0	0	0	0	1	½		½	½	1	1	0	1	5½		2373
9	IM Leon Pliester (Netherlands)	2383	0	½	0	½	1	0	½	½		½	1	½	0	0	5	33.00	2337
10	IM Manuel Bosboom (Netherlands)	2426	0	0	0	½	½	0	0	½	½		0	1	1	1	5	24.25	2334
11	WGM Tea Lanchava (Netherlands)	2366	0	0	0	0	0	0	1	0	0	1		0	1	1	4	17.50	2285
12	WGM Zeinab Mamedyarova (Azerbaijan)	2349	0	0	0	0	0	½	0	0	½	0	1		1	1	4	15.75	2286
13	WIM Bianca Muhren (Netherlands)	2295	½	0	0	1	0	0	0	1	1	0	0	0		0	3½		2256
14	Joost Wempe (Netherlands)	2265	0	0	0	0	½	0	0	0	1	0	0	0	1		2½		2183
