= Alex Golding =

English chess player (born 2003)

Personal information
- Born: October 13, 2003 (age 22) Guildford, England

Chess career
- Country: England
- Title: International Master (2025)
- Peak rating: 2405 (December 2024)

Alex Golding is an English chess player.

== Career ==
In August 2012, he played in the Delancey UK Schools Chess Challenge while a student at Downsend School, where he finished as the top under-11 player.

In December 2016, he held a draw against grandmaster Hrant Melkumyan in the London Chess Classic Super Rapid tournament.

In April 2025, he achieved his final IM norm in the Southend Masters portion of the Southend Easter Chess Festival.

In January 2026, he tied for first place with grandmaster Alexander Kovchan in the Hastings International Chess Congress.
