= Zaven Andriasian =

Armenian chess grandmaster (born 1989)

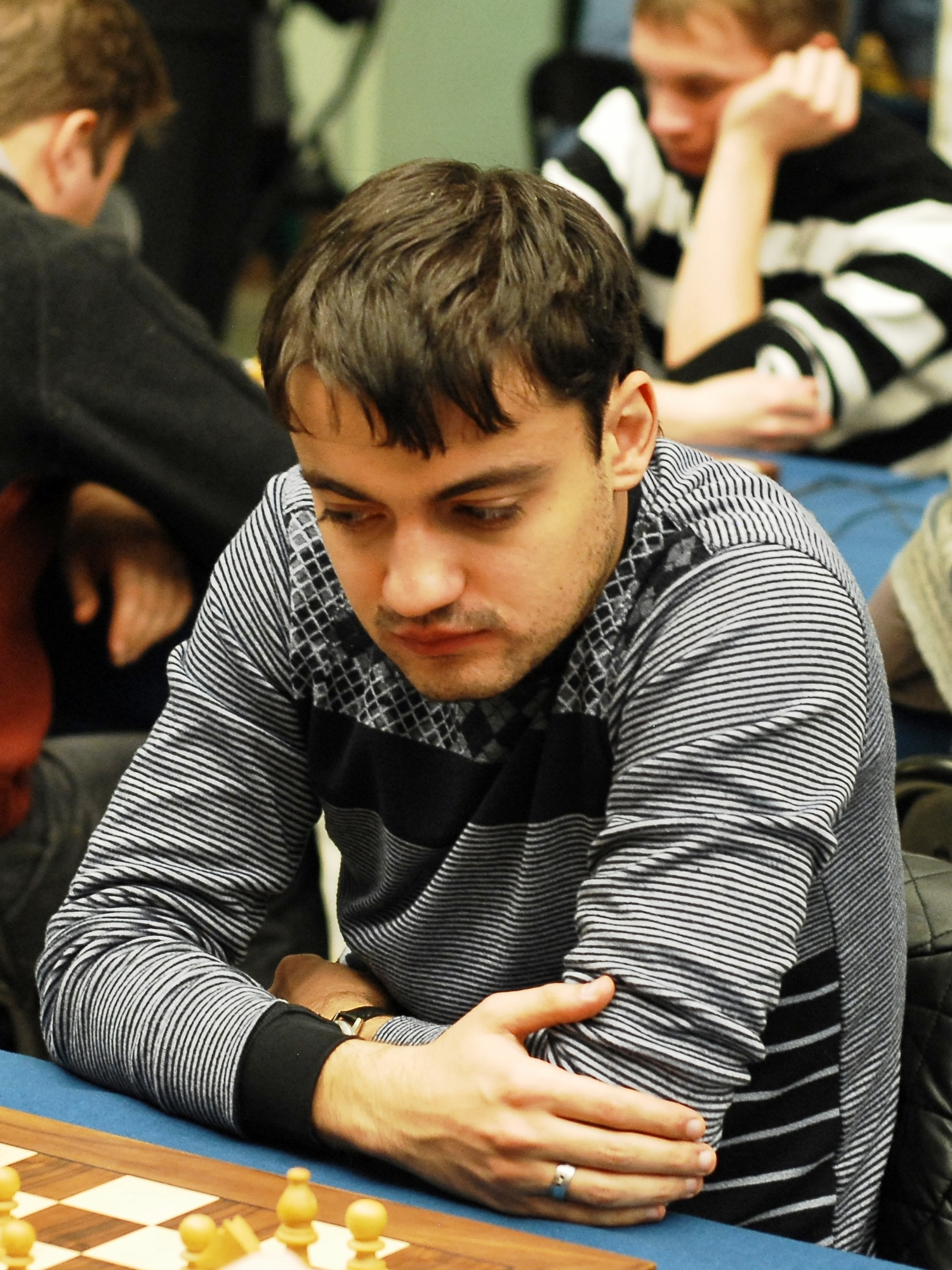
- Zaven Andriasian, Warsaw 2012

Personal information
- Born: March 11, 1989 (age 37) Yerevan, Armenian SSR, Soviet Union

Chess career
- Country: Armenia
- Title: Grandmaster (2006)
- FIDE rating: 2538 (July 2026)
- Peak rating: 2645 (March 2011)

Zaven Andriasian (sometimes transliterated as Andriasyan; Armenian: Զավեն Անդրիասյան; born March 11, 1989) is an Armenia chess Grandmaster and former World Junior Chess Champion.

== Chess career ==
He won the 2005 European Youth Chess Championship for under-16 and the 2006 World Junior Chess Championship. The latter victory automatically earned him the title of Grandmaster (GM). In November 2010 he won the Russian Cup Final after defeating Artyom Timofeev in the second game of the final. In January 2012 he came second in the Armenian Chess960 Championship. In December 2012 he shared first with Alexander Kovchan and Sipke Ernst in the Groningen Chess Festival. In 2016 Andriasian won the Armenian Chess Championship.

== Books ==
- Andriasyan, Zaven (2013). Winning with the Najdorf Sicilian. An Uncompromising Repertoire for Black. New In Chess. ISBN 978-90-5691-429-5.
- Andriasyan, Zaven (2015). The English Attack against the Taimanov Sicilian. A Guide for White. New In Chess. ISBN 978-90-5691-555-1.

== Notable games ==
- Zaven Andriasian vs Maxim Rodshtein, World Junior Championship 2006, French Defense: Tarrasch Variation, Chistyakov Defense Modern Line (C07), 1-0
- Falko Bindrich vs Zaven Andriasian, World Youth Stars 2007, Semi-Slav Defense: Quiet Variation (D30), 0-1
