= Mark van der Werf =

Dutch chess player (born 1968)

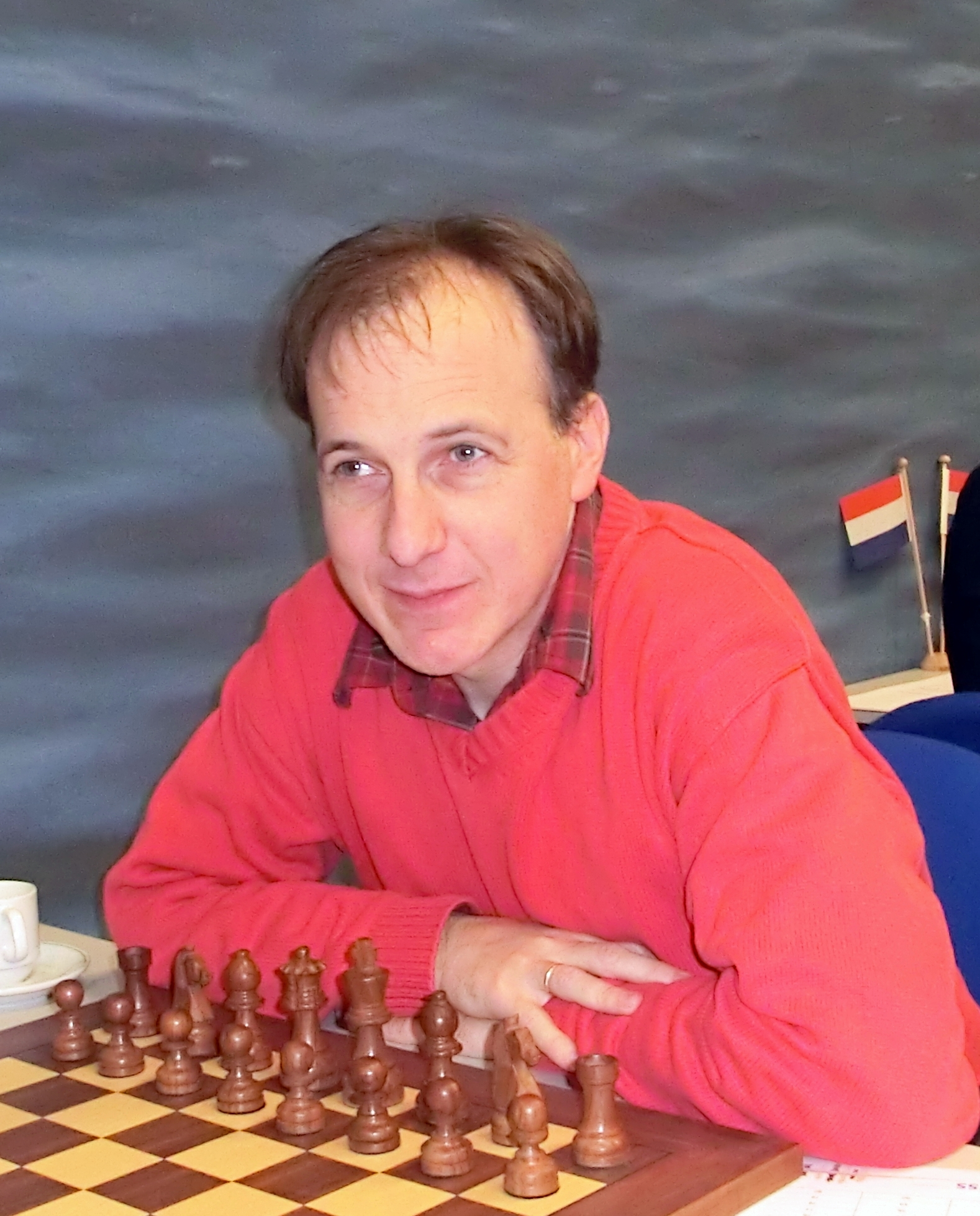
- van der Werf in 2013

Personal information
- Born: February 12, 1968 (age 58) Leeuwarden, Netherlands

Chess career
- Country: Netherlands
- Title: International Master (1993)
- Peak rating: 2452 (March 2012)

Mark van der Werf is a Dutch chess player.

== Chess career ==
In January 1995, he competed in the Hoogovens Wijk aan Zee Chess Tournament 1995, where he was knocked out in the first round by Alexander Khalifman.

In January 2011, he played in Group C of the Tata Steel Chess Tournament 2011, where he scored wins against grandmasters Kateryna Lagno and Dariusz Świercz.

In January 2013, he played in Group C of the Tata Steel Chess Tournament 2013, where he held draws against grandmasters Fernando Peralta and Alexander Kovchan.

In June 2023, he finished tied for first in the Open 50+ section of the European Senior Chess Championship, but ended up in 5th place due to tiebreaks.
