= Henri Grob =

Swiss chess player (1904–1974)

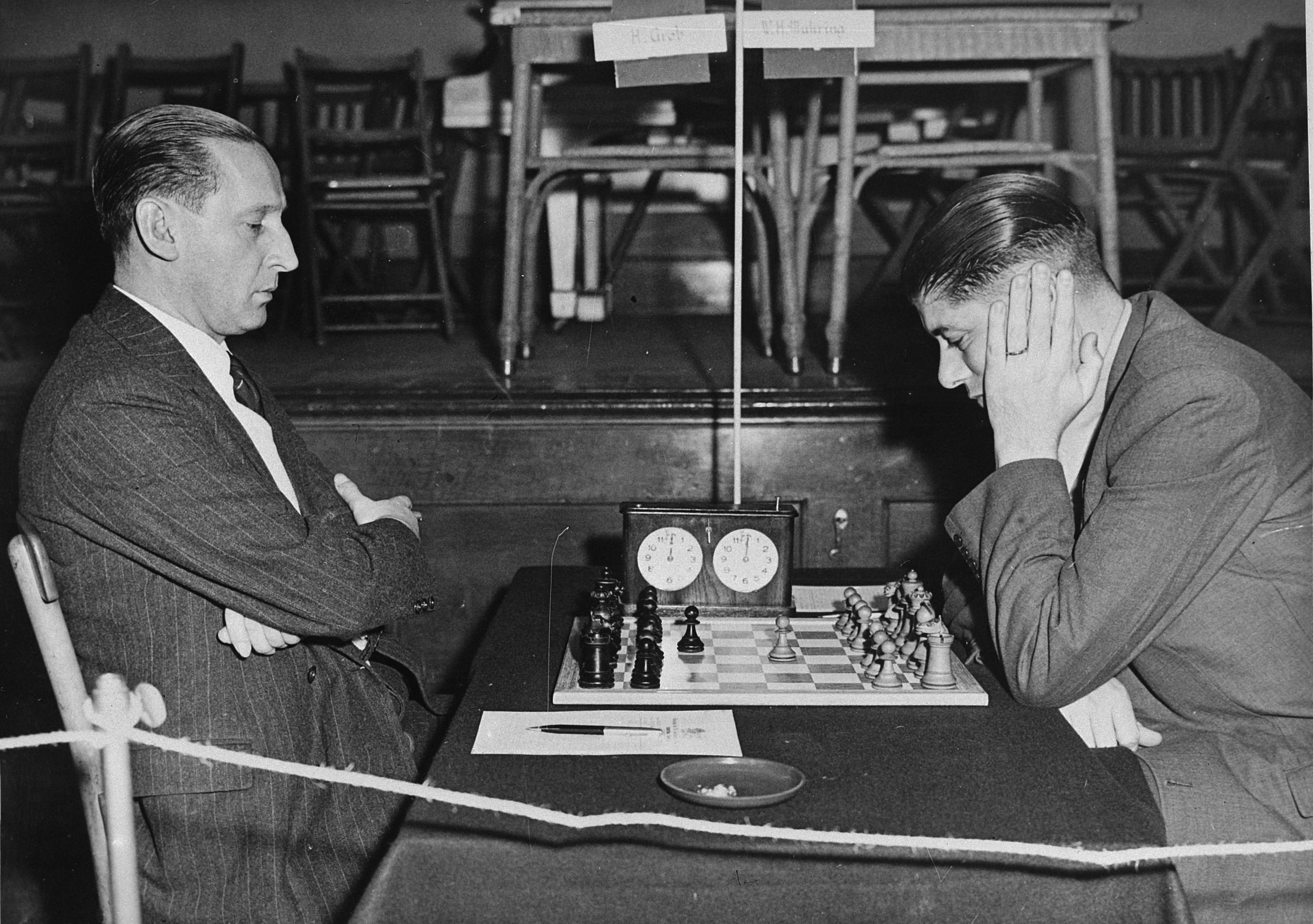
- Willem Mühring (left) vs. Henri Grob (right); Hastings, 1947–48

Personal information
- Born: 4 June 1904
- Died: c. 5 July 1974 (aged 70) (Note: '3 July' according to Gaige, '9 July' according to Golombek, '4 June' according to Mundo del Ajedrez November 1974, p. 318.)

Chess career
- Country: Switzerland
- Title: International Master (1950)

Henri Grob (4 June 1904 – c. 5 July 1974) was a Swiss chess player, artist, and painter. He was Swiss chess champion twice, and was awarded the title of International Master in 1950 at its inauguration. Grob pioneered eccentric chess openings, in particular 1.g4, about which he wrote a book (Angriff g2–g4, Zürich, 1942). The opening is today commonly known as Grob's Attack, and it is this opening that brought him fame within chess communities around the globe rather than his results in chess competitions.

== Chess career ==
=== Notable tournaments ===
Grob was considered a leading Swiss player from the 1930s to 1950s and was invited to many prestigious closed tournaments. In 1926, he tied for 10–12th in Meran (Edgar Colle won). In 1932, he tied for 9–12th in Bern (Alexander Alekhine won). In 1934, he tied for 13–14th in Zürich 1934 (Alekhine won). In 1935, he took 3rd, behind Salo Flohr and George Koltanowski, in Barcelona, took 3rd in Rosas (Flohr won), and took 10th in Bad Nauheim (Bogoljubow won). In 1936, he took 10th in Dresden (Alekhine won), tied for 3rd–4th in Reus, and took 2nd, behind Erik Lundin, in Ostend.

In 1937, Grob won as first on tie-break, 1st–3rd with Reuben Fine and Paul Keres in Ostend (beating Keres and Fine, both elite players and joint winners of the AVRO tournament in 1938). In 1939, he took 9th in Stuttgart (Europa Turnier; Bogoljubow won). In 1947, he tied for 2nd–3rd, behind Savielly Tartakower in Baarn, and took 5th in Venice (Tartakower won). In 1947/48, he tied for 2nd–4th, behind László Szabó, in Hastings. In 1948, he took 8th in Venice (Miguel Najdorf won). In 1949/50, he took 4th in Lucerne (Max Blau won). In 1950, he took 6th in the International Chess Tournament of Gijón. In 1951, he took 10th in Bad Pyrmont (zonal; Svetozar Gligorić won).

=== Representing Switzerland ===
Grob represented Switzerland in Chess Olympiads.

- In 1927, at fourth board in 1st Chess Olympiad in London (+2−5=7).
- In 1935, at second board in 6th Chess Olympiad in Warsaw (+2−8=5).
- In 1936, at third board in 3rd unofficial Chess Olympiad in Munich (+4−7=6).
- In 1952, at first board in 10th Chess Olympiad in Helsinki (+6−6=1).

He also played for Switzerland in some friendly matches.

- In 1950, he lost to Carlos Guimard ½:1½ in Zürich (SUI – ARG).
- In 1951, he drew with Eugenio Szabados 1:1 in Venice (SUI – ITA).
- In 1952, he drew with Rudolf Teschner 1:1 in Lucerne (SUI – FRG).
- In 1955, he won against Ernst Weichselbaumer 1:0 in Zürich (SUI – Saar).

=== Notable matches ===
Grob's matches included games against the following notable masters:

- In 1933, he lost to Salo Flohr (+1−4=1).
- In 1934, he won against Jacques Mieses (+4−1=1).
- In 1935, he lost to Lajos Steiner (+1−3=0).
- In 1937, he drew with George Koltanowski (+1−1=2).
- In 1947, he lost to Max Euwe (+0−5=1).
- In 1948, he lost to Miguel Najdorf (+1−5=0).
- In 1949, he lost to Efim Bogoljubow (+2−4=1).
- In 1950, he lost to Lodewijk Prins (+1−4=1).

=== Notable games ===
- Salo Flohr vs. Grob, Match 1933, Queen's Pawn Game: Krause Variation (D02), 0–1
- Grob vs. Aron Nimzowitsch, Zürich 1934, Alekhine Defence: Normal Variation (B03), ½–½

=== Swiss Chess Championship ===
He was Swiss champion twice, in 1939 and 1951.

=== Correspondence chess ===
Between 1946 and 1972, Grob played 3,614 correspondence games. He won 2,703, lost 430, and drew 481 games. All of the games were played against readers of the Neue Zürcher Zeitung, a leading Swiss newspaper.

== Grob's Attack ==
Grob gives his name to Grob's Attack, an unconventional chess opening featuring the move 1.g4. Grob analysed the opening extensively and used it often in his correspondence games in the Neue Zürcher Zeitung. This opening is classified under the code A00 ("irregular openings" or "uncommon openings") in the Encyclopedia of Chess Openings. The opening is generally shunned by skilled players, as results tend to be poor for White.
