= Frank Parr =

English chess player (1918–2003)

Frank Parr

Frank Parr (17 December 1918 – 28 December 2003) was an English chess player who was born in Wandsworth. He was British Boys (Under 18) champion in 1935.

== Biography ==
Parr won the Hastings Premier in 1939/1940 with a score of 6/7, including five wins and two draws. He played in uniform, having been called up for military service in 1939. This was his only Hastings Premier appearance, although he played in many Challengers' sections up to 2002/3.

Parr was the British correspondence chess champion in 1948 (joint with Gabriel Wood), 1949 (joint with H Israel), 1950, and 1956.

Parr played in 25 British Chess Championships from 1936 to 1991, compiling an overall score of 134½/275. He made his first appearance in the championship in 1936, taking fifth place with 6/11 including a victory over George Alan Thomas. In his second appearance in 1955 he scored 7½ with wins over Robert Wade and Jonathan Penrose. His best result was in 1956 when, after managing only a draw in the first two rounds, he won eight consecutive games before drawing with Leonard Barden in the last round to finish with 9/11. Although this score would have secured first place in most years, he took second a half point behind Conel Hugh O'Donel Alexander despite having won their individual encounter in round eight.

Parr was a traveling reserve member of the English team for the 1937 Anglo–Dutch match in Amsterdam, but he did not play. He scored 1½/2 on ninth board at the 1939 Anglo–Dutch match in The Hague. He never held any FIDE or British Chess Federation titles.

Before retirement he worked as a messenger at the London Stock Exchange. He had three sons and one daughter. Aside from chess, his main hobby was gardening, but he was also a supporter of Fulham Football Club and a patron of Surrey County Cricket Club.

After a long illness Parr died in Epsom on 28 December 2003, the opening day of the Hastings International Chess Congress.

== Legacy ==
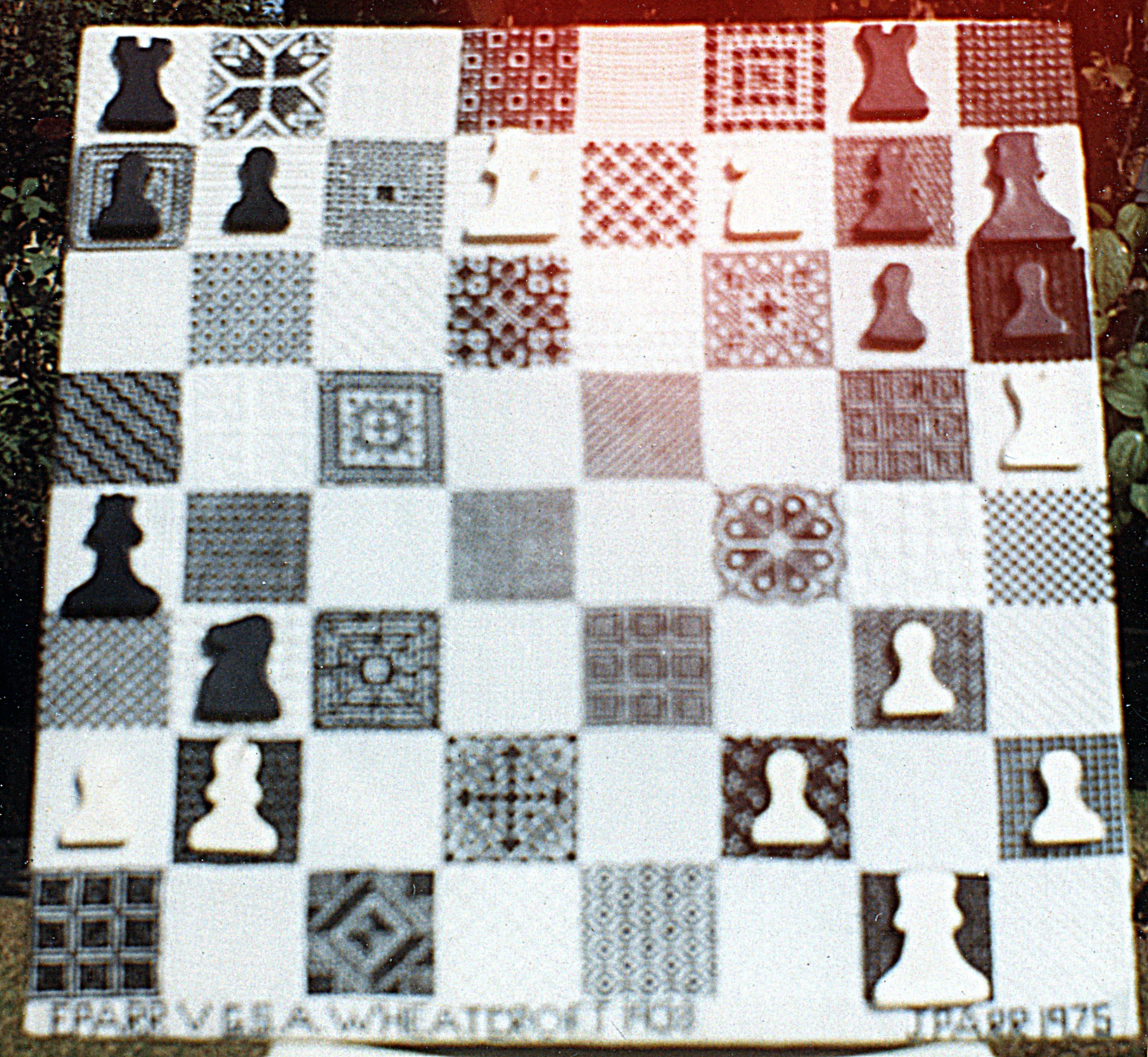
Tapestry of Parr vs. Wheatcroft

The British Federation for Correspondence Chess introduced a Frank Parr Memorial Tournament in 2005. Held alongside it was the David Parr Memorial, dedicated to Frank's eldest son, another fine chess player who also died in 2003.

Parr had a long chess career. He was known for his aggressive style and alertness to tactical possibilities.

The following game is his best-known, and he annotated it for British Chess Magazine. He had a tapestry made of one of the game's key positions, which he hung on the wall of his living room. Reinfeld and Chernev, in their Fireside Book of Chess, eulogize—"In the opinion of the writers, Parr's masterpiece has well-founded claims to being considered the finest attacking game of all time." After the final move they exclaim "One of the greatest combinative games on record!"

== Notable game ==
Frank Parr vs. George Wheatcroft, City of London Chess Club Championship 1938, Neo-Grünfeld Defence
1. d4 Nf6 2. c4 g6 3. g3 Bg7 4. Bg2 d5 5. cxd5 Nxd5 6. Nc3 Nxc3 7. bxc3 c5 8. e3 0-0 9. Ne2 Nc6 10. 0-0 cxd4 11. cxd4 e5? 12. d5! Ne7 13. Ba3 Re8 14. Nc3 Qa5 15. Qb3 e4?! 16. Nxe4! Nxd5 After 16...Bxa1 17.Rxa1 Nxd5 18.Rd1! White has too many threats. 17. Rac1 Be6 18. Rc5 Qb6 19. Rb5! Qa6 20. Nc5! Nxe3?! 21. Nxe6! Nxf1 Now Black intends to meet 22.Nxg7 with 22...Nd2! 22. Ng5!! Nd2 23. Qxf7+ Kh8 24. Bd5!! Threatening 25.Qg8+! Rxg8 26.Nf7#. h6 25. Bb2! Again threatening mate; Black cannot play 25...Bxb2 because of 26.Qh7#. Rg8 26. Qd7!! Now White has two pieces hanging, but neither can be captured: if 26...hxg5, 27.Qh3#. In the meantime, White threatens 27.Qh3! and 28.Qxh6#. Qa4 Threatening 27...Qd1+ 28.Kg2 Qf1#! 27. Bb3! Nxb3 28. Nf7+ Kh7 29. Rh5!! Leaving two more pieces en prise. If 29...Qxd7, 30.Ng5+ Kh8 31.Rxh6#. If 29...gxh5, 30.Qf5#. Qa5 30. Rxh6+! 1–0 (Black resigned). If 30...Bxh6, 31.Ng5 double check Kh8 32.Qh7#.
