= Nargiz Umudova =

Azerbaijani chess player (born 1989)

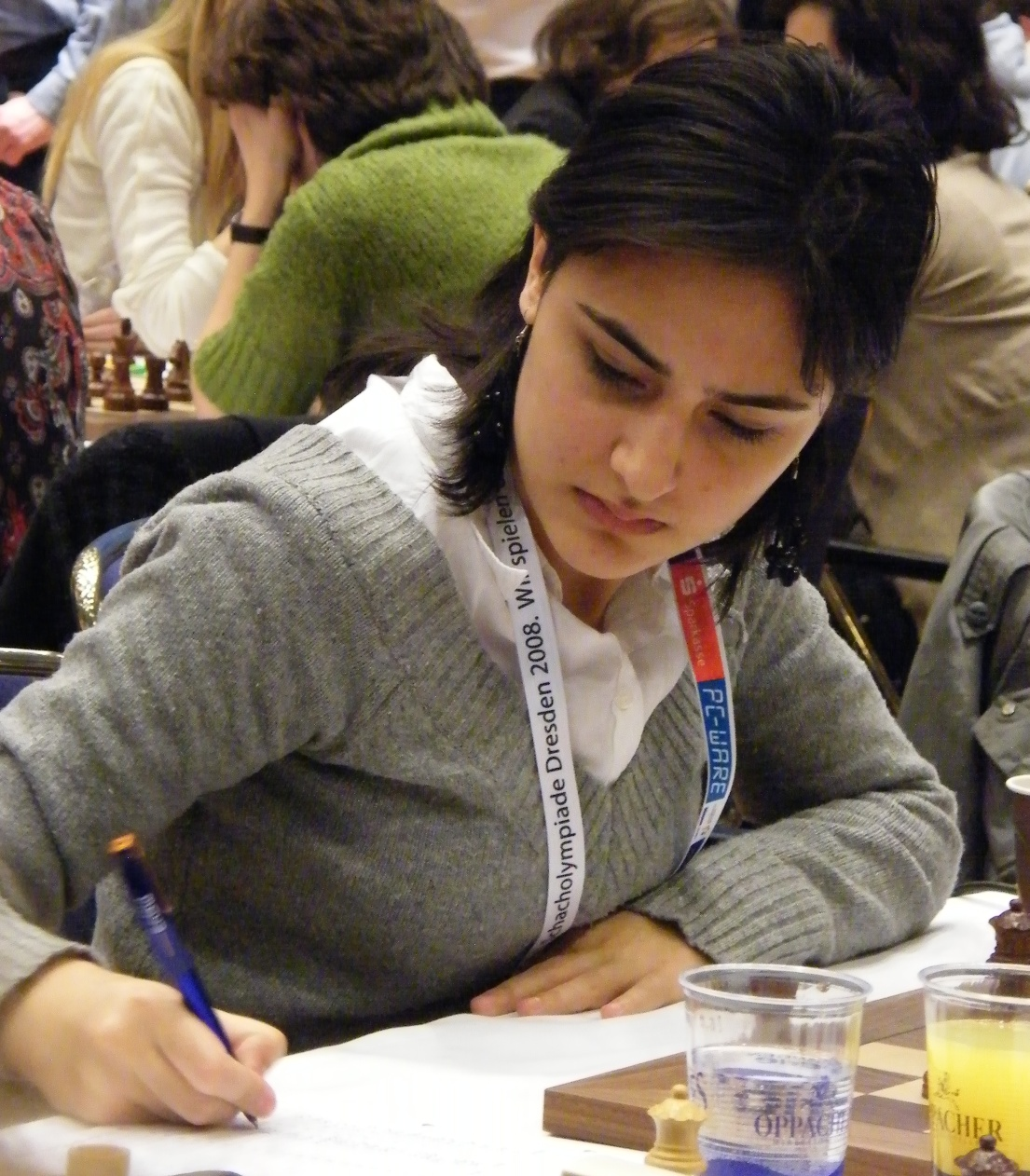
- Umudova in 2008

Personal information
- Born: Nərgiz Məmmədağa qızı Umudova; 20 June 1989 (age 37) Baku, Azerbaijan SSR, Soviet Union
- Spouse: Twan Burg (m. 2016)

Chess career
- Country: Azerbaijan
- Title: Woman Grandmaster (2015)
- Peak rating: 2301 (June 2019)

Nərgiz Məmmədağa qızı Umudova (born 20 June 1989) is an Azerbaijani chess player who holds the FIDE title of Woman Grandmaster (WGM, 2015).

== Biography ==
In 2005 and 2009, Umudova won the Azerbaijani Girl's Chess Championships. In 2001, in Kallithea she won bronze medal in European Youth Chess Championship in girl's U12 age group. In 2008, in Batumi she won silver medal in World Youth Chess Championship in girl's U18 age group behind Harika Dronavalli.

She played for Azerbaijan and Azerbaijan 2 teams in the Women's Chess Olympiads:

- In 2006, at the second board in the 37th Chess Olympiad (women) in Turin (+7, =3, -2),
- In 2008, at the third board in the 38th Chess Olympiad (women) in Dresden (+3, =2, -3),
- In 2010, at the fourth board in the 39th Chess Olympiad (women) in Khanty-Mansiysk (+5, =2, -2),
- In 2012, at the fourth board in the 40th Chess Olympiad (women) in Istanbul (+3, =1, -3),
- In 2016, at reserve board in the 42nd Chess Olympiad (women) in Baku (+5, =3, -1),

Umudova played for Azerbaijan in the European Women's Team Chess Championships:

- In 2007, at the fourth board in the 7th European Team Chess Championship (women) in Heraklion (+3, =1, -2),
- In 2011, at reserve board in the 9th European Team Chess Championship (women) in Porto Carras (+3, =0, -4),
- In 2013, at reserve board in the 10th European Team Chess Championship (women) in Warsaw (+3, =1, -2).

In 2007, she received the FIDE Woman International Master (WIM) title and received the FIDE Woman Grandmaster (WGM) in 2015.

== Personal life ==
In 2016, Umudova married Dutch Grandmaster Twan Burg.
