= Conor Murphy (chess player) =

Irish chess player (born 1999)

Personal information
- Born: July 15, 1999 (age 26)

Chess career
- Country: England (until 2018); Ireland (since 2018)
- Title: International Master (2021)
- FIDE rating: 2439 (July 2026)
- Peak rating: 2487 (December 2023)

Conor Edmond Murphy is an Irish chess player.

== Chess career ==
In January 2019, he tied for first place with Daniel Gormally, Oleg Korneev, Šarūnas Šulskis, Martin Petrov, and Alexander Cherniaev at the 94th Hastings Congress. He was the lowest-rated player who tied for first and defeated grandmaster Šulskis during the event.

In August 2019, he won the Irish Chess Championship.

In August 2022, he played for Ireland at the 44th Chess Olympiad, where he earned his second GM norm and defeated four grandmasters: Amin Tabatabaei, Matthias Blübaum, Adham Fawzy, and Lorenzo Lodici, and had a performance rating of 2704. His result was deemed as the "strongest Olympiad performance by an Irish player" by Leonard Barden.
