= Alexander Cherniaev =

Russian-English chess grandmaster (born 1969)

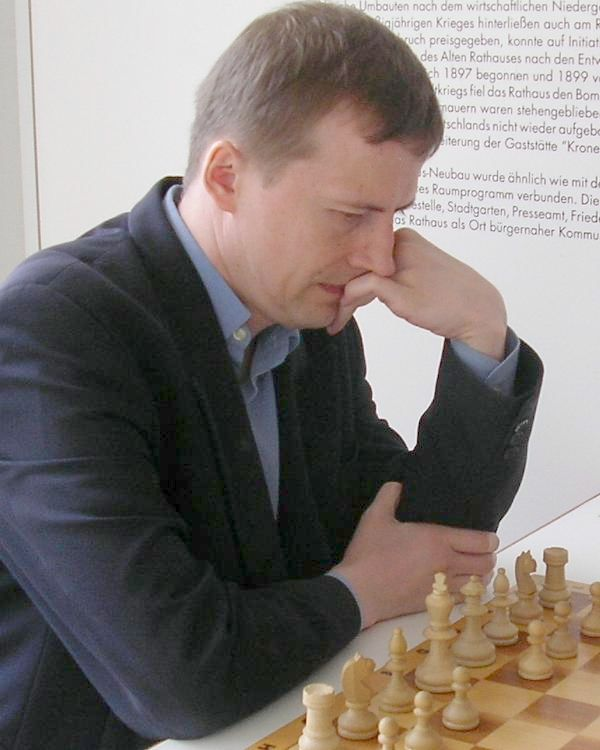
- Cherniaev in 2010

Personal information
- Born: August 26, 1969 (age 56) Arkhangelsk, Soviet Union

Chess career
- Country: Russia (until 2022); England (since 2022)
- Title: Grandmaster (2004)
- Peak rating: 2509 (July 2002)

Alexander Sergeevich Cherniaev is a Russian chess grandmaster who plays for England.

== Chess career ==
In November 2007, he won the "First Thursday of the month" blitz tournament at the Hendon Chess Club.

In January 2019, he tied for first place with Daniel Gormally, Oleg Korneev, Šarūnas Šulskis, Martin Petrov, and Conor Murphy at the 94th Hastings Congress.

In July 2019, he gave a lecture and held a simultaneous exhibition in Regina, Saskatchewan, Canada as part of the Canadian Open.
