= Harmen Jonkman =

Dutch chess grandmaster (born 1975)

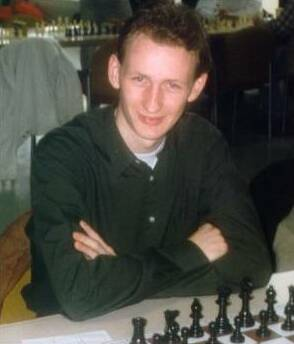
- Jonkman in 2004

Personal information
- Born: May 30, 1975 (age 51) Beverwijk, Netherlands

Chess career
- Country: Netherlands
- Title: Grandmaster (2002)
- Peak rating: 2520 (April 2002)

Harmen Jonkman is a Dutch chess grandmaster.

== Chess career ==
In January 2005, he finished in 6th place in the Corus Chess Tournament 2005. At the tournament, he managed to win against the higher-rated Manuel Bosboom.

In April 2016, he won the 9th OGD Rapid Chess Tournament, defeating Johan Quist due to better tiebreaks.

In August 2017, he was held to a draw by Vantika Agrawal at the Abu Dhabi Masters, who also scored her first WGM norm.

== Personal life ==
Off the chessboard, he works as a software engineer.
