= Willem Mühring =

Dutch chess player

Willem Jan Muhring
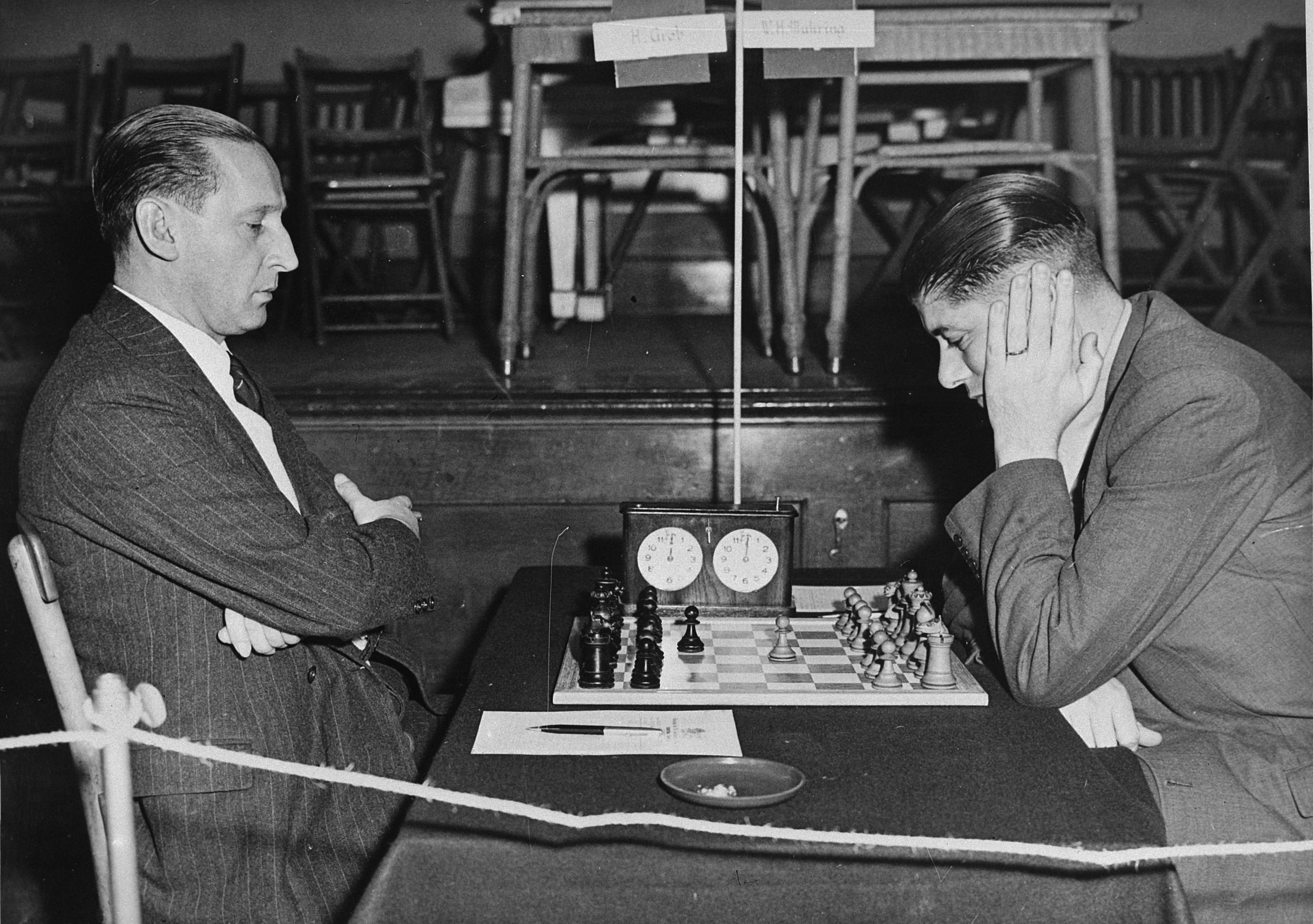
- Willem Jan Muhring (right) vs. Henri Grob (left); Hastings, 1947–48

Personal information
- Born: Willem Jan Muhring; 17 August 1913 IJmuiden, Netherlands
- Died: 17 January 1997 (aged 83)

Chess career
- Country: Netherlands
- Title: International Master (1951)

Willem Jan Muhring (17 August 1913 – 17 January 1997) was a Dutch chess player. He was awarded the title of International Master in 1951.

== Biography ==
Willem Muhring was one of the pioneers in the implementation of IBM computers in Netherlands public administration.

Also Willem Muhring was a well-known tournament chess player and international chess master (1951). He learnt the game at the age of fifteen. In 1932, Willem Muhring won the Rotterdam City Chess Championship. In 1947, in Hilversum he ranked 2nd in an International Chess Tournament before Max Euwe. After Second World War he successfully played in Hastings International Chess Congress:

- 1947/1948 shared 2nd - 3rd place;
- 1948/1949 ranked 3rd place.

In 1955, in Johannesburg he shared 1st in International Chess Tournament before Max Euwe.

Willem Muhring played for Netherlands in the Chess Olympiad:

- In 1956, at fourth board in the 12th Chess Olympiad in Moscow (+3, =10, -4).

Willem Muhring played for Netherlands in the unofficial Chess Olympiad:

- In 1936, at sixth board in the 3rd unofficial Chess Olympiad in Munich (+4, =9, -4).

Willem Muhring played for Netherlands in the European Team Chess Championship preliminaries:

- In 1957, at sixth board in the 1st European Team Chess Championship preliminaries (+0, =2, -0).

Willem Muhring played for Netherlands in the Clare Benedict Chess Cup:

- In 1953, at fifth board in the 1st Clare Benedict Chess Cup in Mont Pèlerin (+3, =2, -0) and won team and individual gold medals.
