= Aleksander Miśta =

Polish chess grandmaster (born 1983)

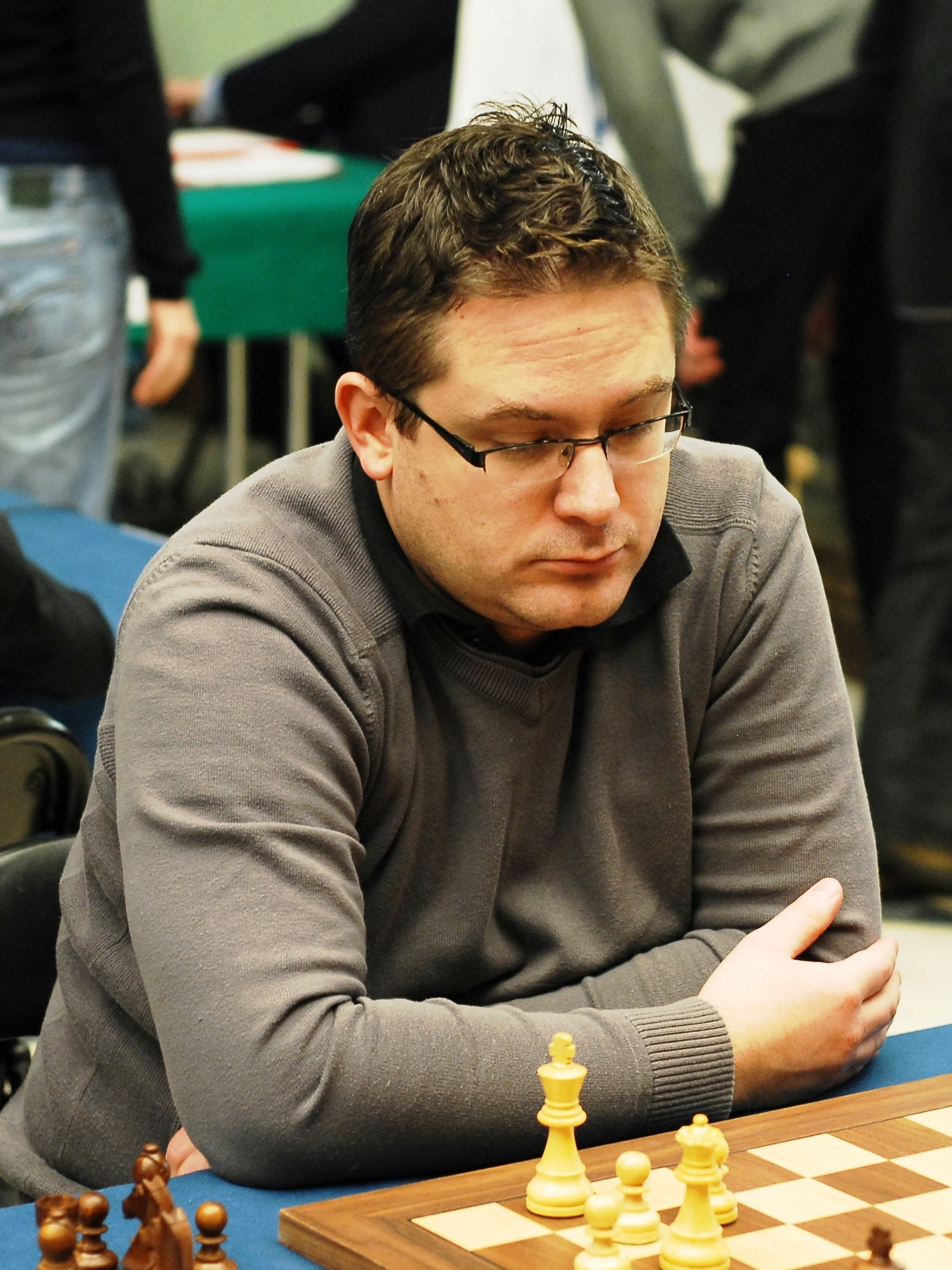
- Miśta in 2012 (Warsaw)

Personal information
- Born: 7 January 1983 (age 43) Myszków, Poland

Chess career
- Country: Poland
- Title: Grandmaster (2004)
- FIDE rating: 2494 (July 2026)
- Peak rating: 2625 (September 2014)

Aleksander Miśta (born 7 January 1983) is a Polish chess Grandmaster (2004) and FIDE Trainer (2012).

== Chess career ==
Aleksander Miśta is a multiple medalist of the Polish Junior Chess Championship:

- Gold: 1991 (U10), 2000 (U18), 2001 (U18);
- Silver: 2000 (U20), 2003 (U20);
- Bronze: 1993 (U10), 1999 (U16), 2001 (U20), 2002 (U20).

In 2009 he was third in Polish Chess Championship. Aleksander Miśta was runner up at the Miguel Najdorf Memorial Tournament in 2010.

In 2014 he won Banca Feroviar Open tournament in the Arad and was third in the Polish Blitz Chess Championship in Bydgoszcz.

Aleksander Miśta is the former coach of the Polish Women's team for the European Team Chess Championship (2011, Poland team won the silver medal) and the 40th Chess Olympiad (2012).

Also Aleksander Miśta is successful in solving chess competition. He three times won team gold for Poland in World Chess Solving Championship:

- 2012 in Kobe,
- 2013 in Batumi,
- 2014 in Bern.

In January 2021, Mista tied for first place with IM Zurab Javakhadze in the Charlotte Chess Center's Winter 2021 GM Norm Invitational held in Charlotte, North Carolina with an undefeated score of 6.0/9.

== Personal life ==
Aleksander Miśta studied physics at the Gdańsk University of Technology.
