= Holden Hernández Carmenate =

Cuban-American chess grandmaster (born 1984)

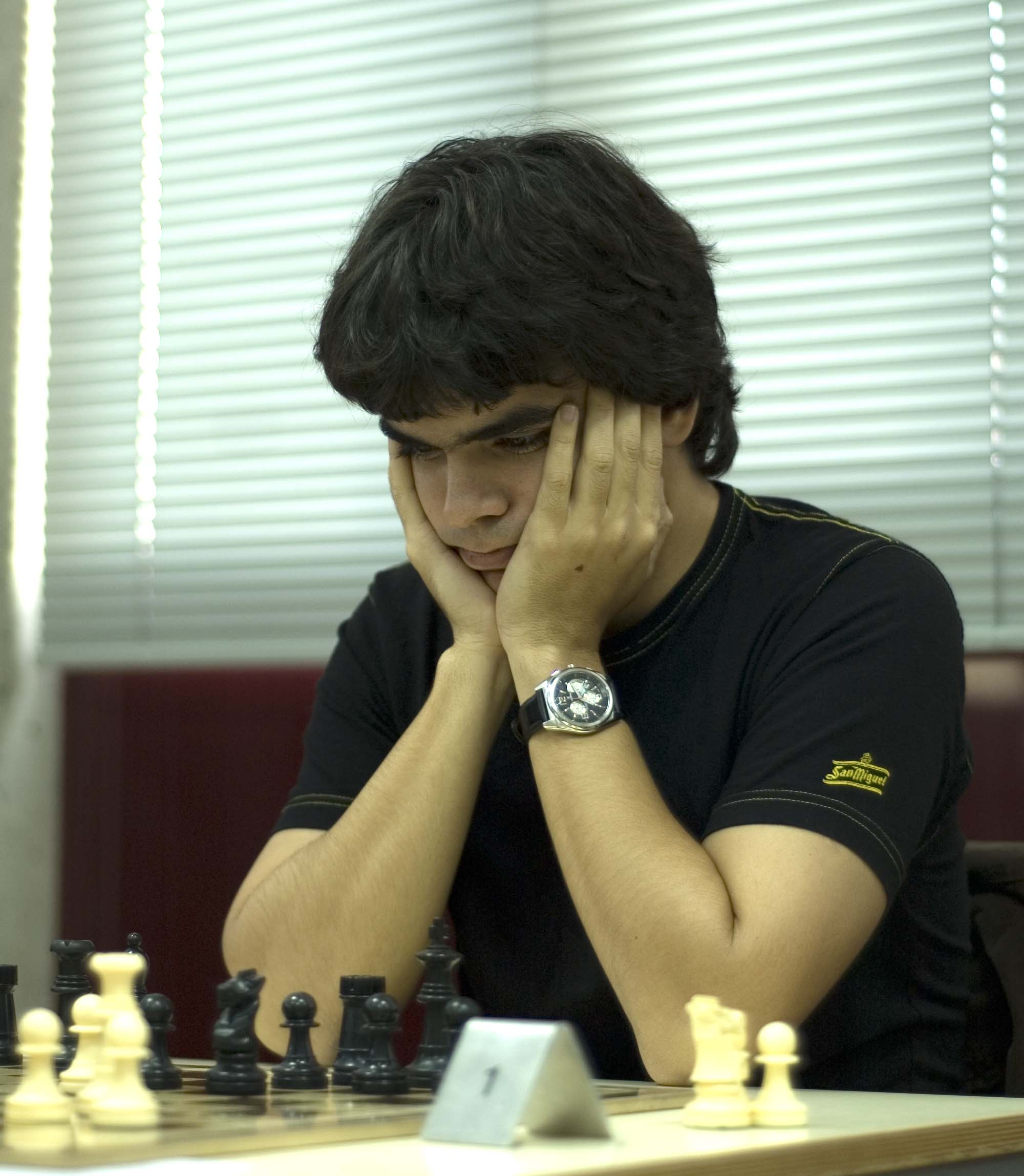
- Hernández in 2009

Personal information
- Born: August 10, 1984 (age 41) Güines, Cuba

Chess career
- Country: Cuba (until 2013); United States (since 2013)
- Title: Grandmaster (2007)
- FIDE rating: 2479 (July 2026)
- Peak rating: 2590 (January 2008)

Holden Hernández Carmenate is a Cuban-American chess grandmaster.

== Chess career ==
In October 2006, Hernández achieved his final GM norm at the Open de Alca de Henares in Spain. He was later awarded the Grandmaster title in 2007.

In 2011, Hernández was considered one of the top 10 players in Cuba.

In September 2012, Hernández won the Óliver González Chess Memorial ahead of Martyn Kravtsiv and Andrey Vovk.

In December 2013, Hernández transferred federations from Cuba to the United States.

In February 2015, Hernández tied for first in the Texas Southwest Class Masters with Gata Kamsky, Yaroslav Zherebukh, and Anton Kovalyov, but lost to Kamsky on tiebreaks.

== Personal life ==
Hernández studied at the University of Texas at Dallas, where he was the captain of the chess team.
