= Roland Schmaltz =

German chess grandmaster (born 1974)

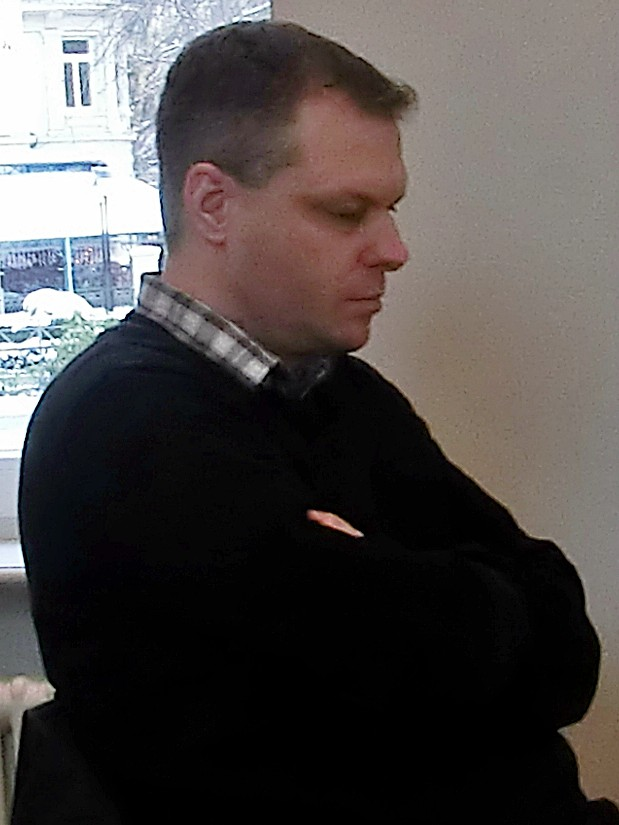
- Schmaltz in 2012

Personal information
- Born: 15 November 1974 (age 51) Mannheim, Germany

Chess career
- Country: Germany
- Title: Grandmaster (2001)
- FIDE rating: 2446 (September 2026)
- Peak rating: 2559 (April 2002)

Roland Schmaltz (born 15 November 1974) is a German chess grandmaster. His peak Elo rating was 2559. He has the nickname "Hawkeye" and is a champion in bullet chess.
