= Artur Kogan =

Ukrainian-born Israeli chess grandmaster

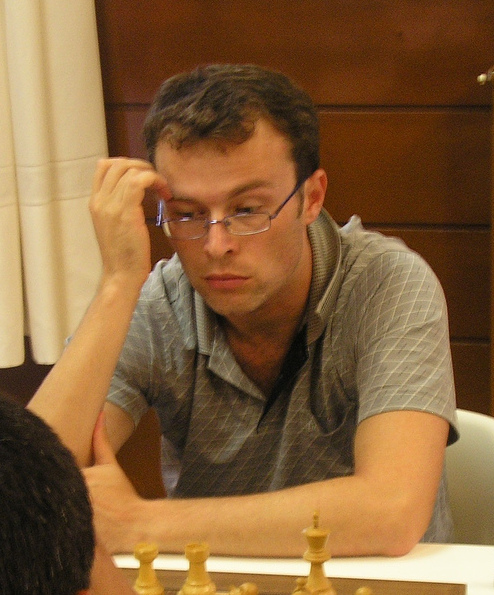

Personal information
- Native name: ארתור קוגן
- Born: 29 January 1974 (age 52) Chernivtsi, Ukraine

Chess career
- Country: Israel
- Title: Grandmaster (1998)
- FIDE rating: 2477 (July 2026)
- Peak rating: 2592 (January 2005)

Artur Kogan (Hebrew: ארתור קוגן; born 29 January 1974) is a Ukrainian–born Israeli chess grandmaster.

Kogan emigrated from Ukraine to Israel when he was two years old and spent more than 20 years in Israel. He currently resides in Tarragona, Catalonia, Spain.

In 1981–89 he was the winner of town open championships in Israel of Bat Yam, Holon, Rishon LeZion, Petah Tikva, among others.

Among other tournaments, he has won the 1994 Kecskemét, 1996 Formies, 1996 Vlissingen, 1996 Sas Van Gent Open (Netherlands), 1996 Ischia (Italy), 1998 Ljubljana (Slovenia), 1998 Pyramiden Cup (Germany), 1999 Ljubliana, 2000 Almassora (Spain), 2000 Cutro Open (Italy), 2000 Quebec Open, 2001 Nordic Scandinavian Open, 2001 Salou Costa Dorada (Spain), 2002 Genove (Italy), 2003 Lido Estensi, 2005 Paris Open, 2005 Tarragona Open, 2006 Ashdod Open (Israel) and 2011 Torredembarra Open tournaments.

He was awarded the Grandmaster title in 1998.
