= Wouter Spoelman =

Dutch chess grandmaster

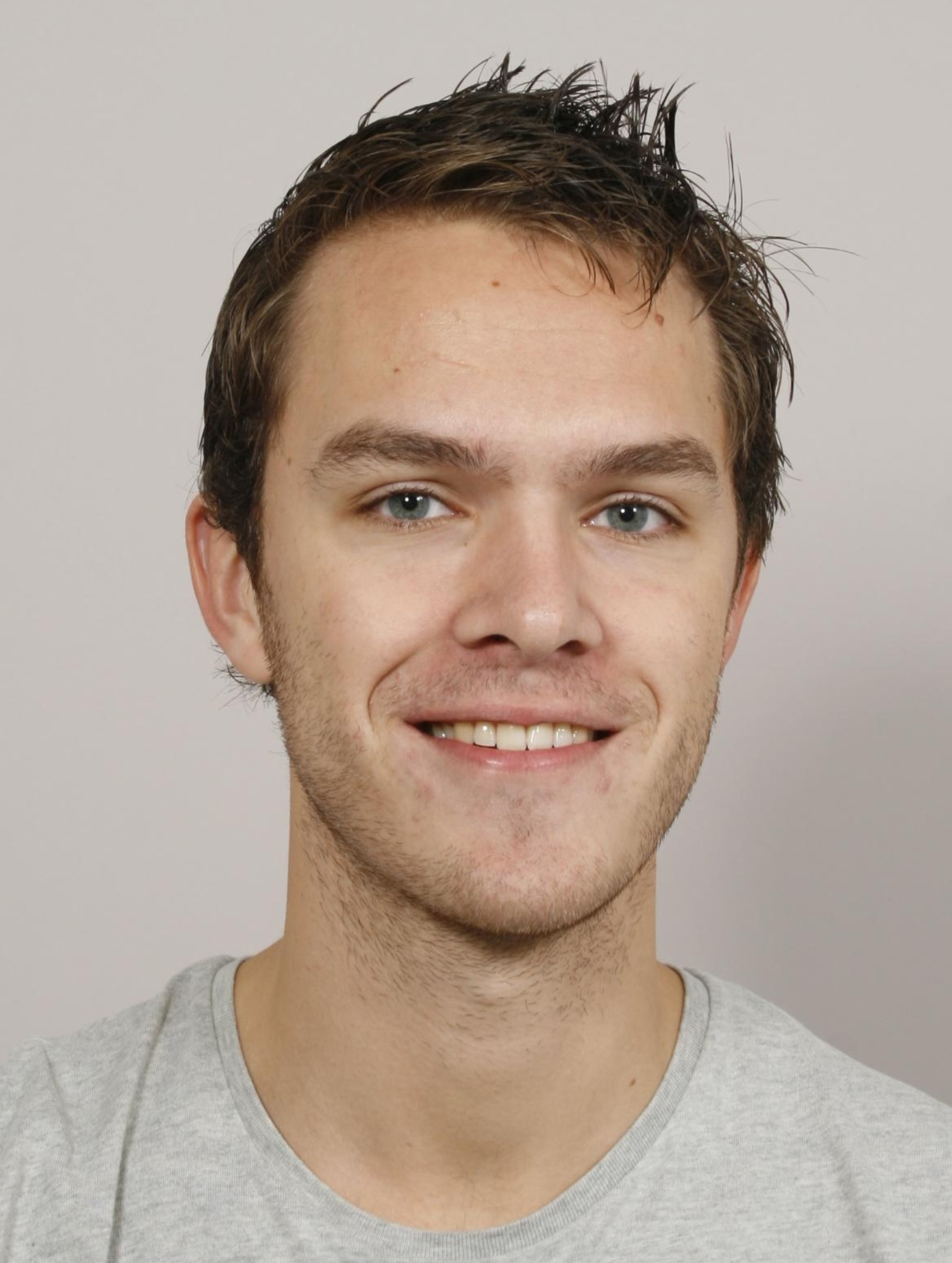
- Wouter Spoelman, 2014

Personal information
- Born: 5 June 1990 (age 36) Zwolle, Netherlands

Chess career
- Country: Netherlands
- Title: Grandmaster (2009)
- FIDE rating: 2538 (July 2026)
- Peak rating: 2588 (March 2017)

Wouter Spoelman (born 5 June 1990) is a Dutch chess grandmaster.

== Chess career ==
Born in 1990, Spoelman earned his international master title in 2006 and his grandmaster title in 2009. He is the No. 12 ranked Dutch player as of March 2018.
