= Eugenio Szabados =

Hungarian-Italian chess player (1898–1974)

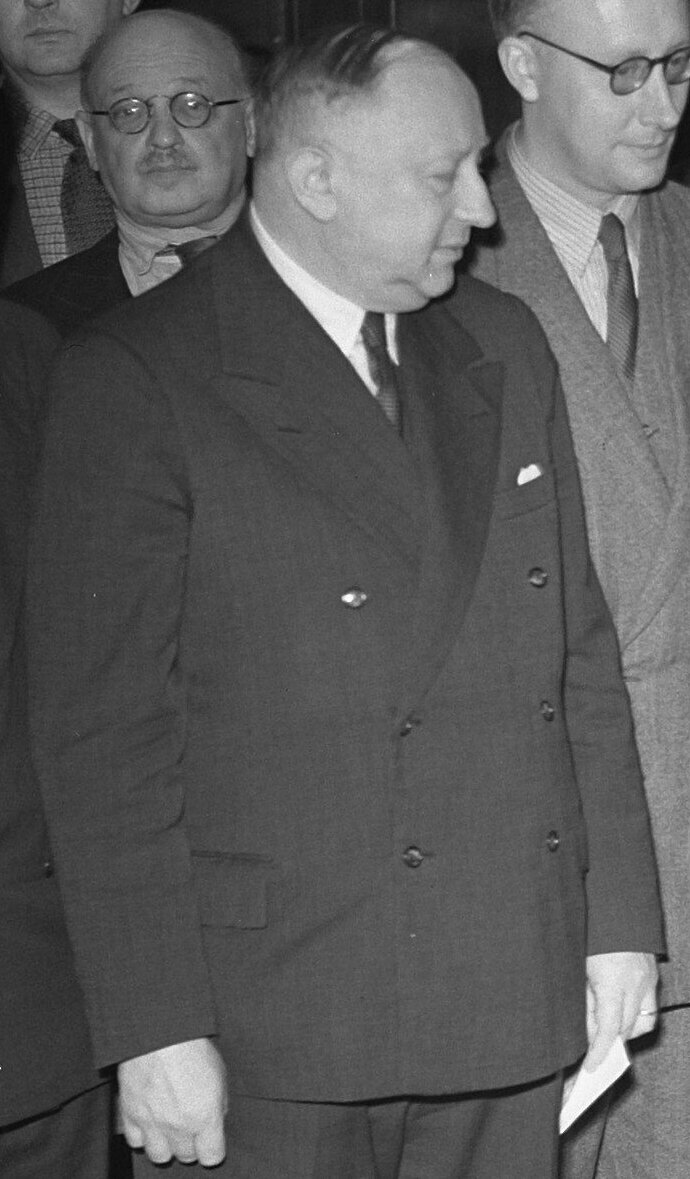
Szabados in Amsterdam, 1950

Eugenio Szabados (3 July 1898 in Sânger, Hungary – 6 March 1974 in Venice) was a Hungarian–Italian chess master.

In 1921, he won the Società Scacchistica Torinese Championship, and tied for 5–7th in Viareggio. In 1923, he took 3rd behind Romeo Ferrari and Zdenek Formanek in Trieste. In 1928, he took 5th in Venice. In 1929, he took 8th in Venice. In 1930, he took 2nd, behind Jacques Mieses, in Venice.

In 1948, he tied for 9–11th in Venice (Miguel Najdorf won). In 1949, he took 13th in Venice (László Szabó won). In 1950, he tied for 18–20th in Amsterdam (Najdorf won). In 1950, he tied for 15–16th in Venice (Alexander Kotov won). In 1951, he took 2nd in Venice (14th ITA-ch). In 1952, he tied for 7–8th in Ferrara (15th ITA-ch). In 1953, he took 6th in Florence (16th ITA-ch). In 1953, he took 12th in Venice (Esteban Canal won).

He played for Italy in friendly matches; ITA–SUI at Venice 1951, ITA–SUI at Lausanne 1952, ITA–YUG at Bled 1953.

In 1950–1958 he was president of the Italian Chess Federation. Szabados was awarded the International Master title in 1951.
