= Lisa Schut =

Dutch chess player (born 1994)

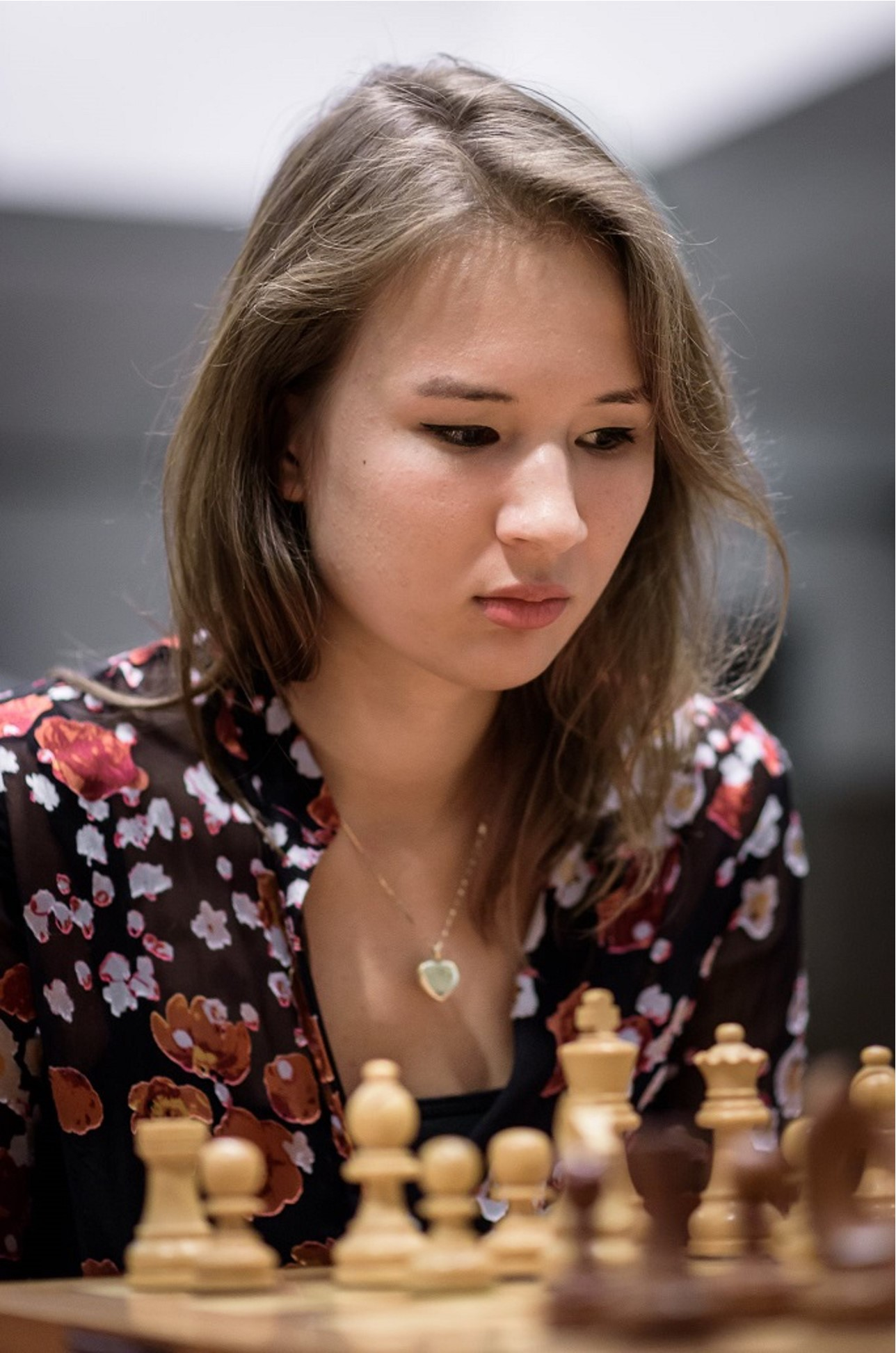
- Lisa Schut at Amstelveen 2016

Personal information
- Born: 6 July 1994 (age 32) Veldhoven, Netherlands

Chess career
- Country: Netherlands
- Title: Woman International Master (2009)
- FIDE rating: 2259 (March 2018)
- Peak rating: 2333 (September 2013)

Lisa Schut (born 6 July 1994) is a Dutch chess player. Schut is currently inactive; her last rated game was a single game in March 2018, and prior to that, September 2015.

== Chess career ==
Schut won the women's section of the Dutch Chess Championship in 2013.

She participated in the 2008 Chess Olympiad, 2010 Chess Olympiad, 2012 Chess Olympiad and the 2014 Chess Olympiad.

Schut won the silver medal at the 2012 World Youth Chess Championship (Girls U18), and shared first place (bronze on tiebreak) at the 2010 World Youth Chess Championship (Girls U16). In 2009 Schut won the bronze medal at the European Youth Chess Champinship (Girls U16) in Fermo.

Schut is first author of the paper titled "Bridging the Human–AI Knowledge Gap: Concept Discovery and Transfer in AlphaZero", published in the Proceedings of the National Academy of Sciences (PNAS) in 2025. The paper introduces a method for extracting unique chess concepts from AlphaZero and shows these concepts can be successfully learned by grandmasters.
