= Alexander Kovchan =

Ukrainian chess player

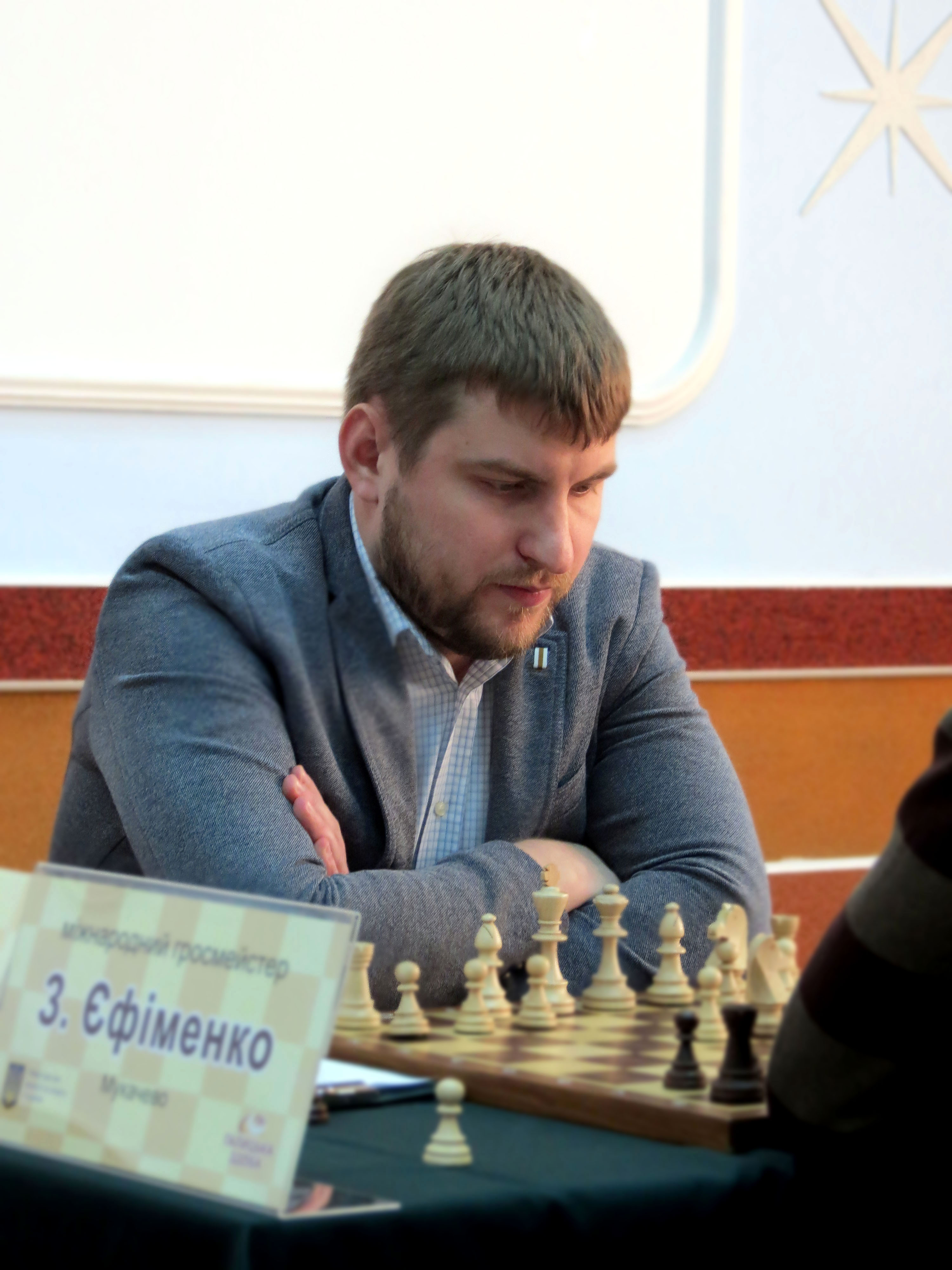
- Kovchan at the 2015 Ukrainian Championship, Lviv

Personal information
- Born: Oleksandr Anatoliyovych Kovchan; 21 October 1983 (age 42) Chernihiv, Ukrainian SSR, Soviet Union (now Ukraine)

Chess career
- Country: Ukraine
- Title: Grandmaster (2002)
- FIDE rating: 2445 (July 2026)
- Peak rating: 2605 (August 2015)

Alexander Anatolyevich Kovchan (Ukrainian: Олександр Анатолійович Ковчан, Oleksandr Anatoliyovych Kovchan; born 21 October 1983) is a Ukrainian chess Grandmaster (2002).

== Biography ==
Kovchan played for Ukraine in the 1995 Children's Chess Olympiad.

In 2011, he tied for 2nd–5th with Tigran Gharamian, Boris Grachev and Ante Brkić in the Open Master Tournament in Biel. In December 2011, he tied for 1st–2nd with Robert Hess in the Groningen Chess Festival and in the same tournament of the following year, he tied for 1st–3rd with Zaven Andriasian and Sipke Ernst, earning him an invitation to the 75th Tata Steel Chess Tournament in January 2013.

Kovchan competed in Grandmaster Group C of the 75th Tata Steel Chess Tournament from 11 to 27 January 2013 in Wijk aan Zee, where he finished 5th place by scoring 7½/13 (+3 =9 -1).
