= Igor Khenkin =

German chess grandmaster (born 1968)

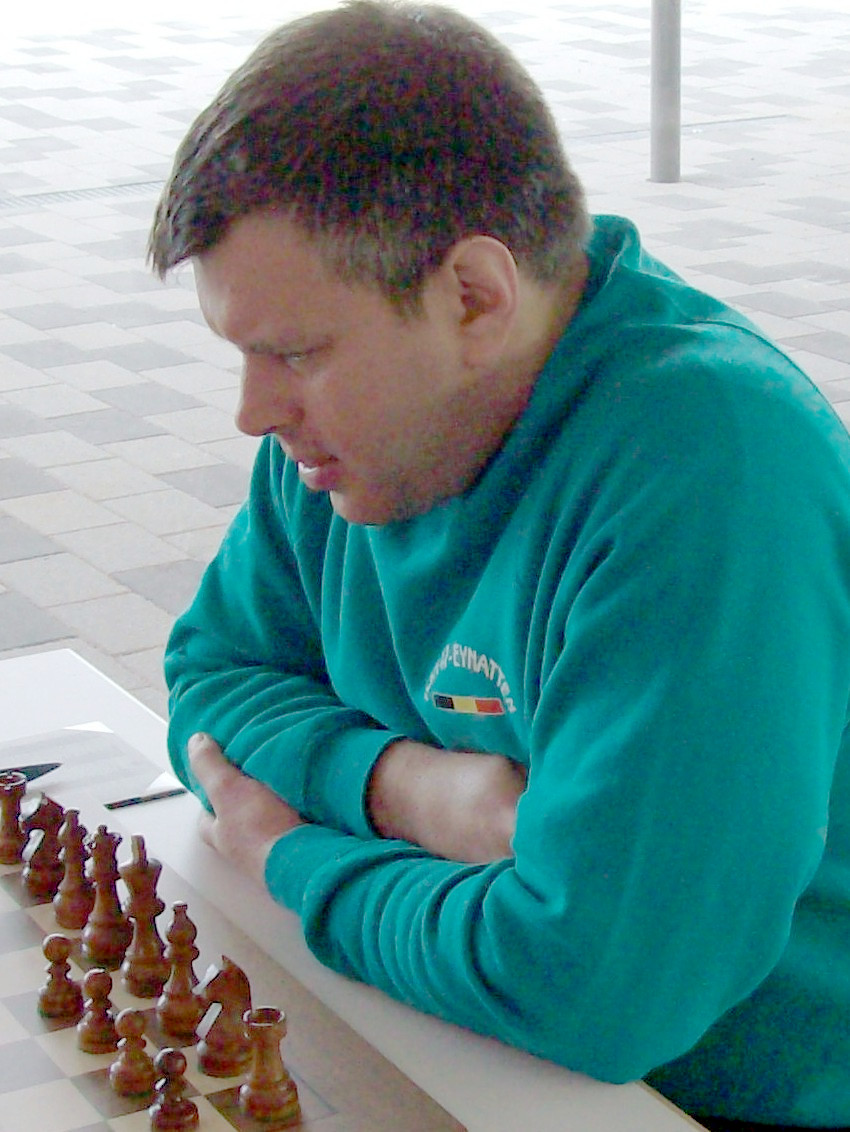

Personal information
- Born: 21 March 1968 (age 58) Vladimir, USSR

Chess career
- Country: Germany (since 1999); Russia (1991–1999); Soviet Union (until 1991)
- Title: Grandmaster (1992)
- FIDE rating: 2479 (November 2026)
- Peak rating: 2670 (May 2012)
- Peak ranking: No. 35 (January 1999)

Igor Khenkin (born 21 March 1968 in Vladimir, Russia) is a German chess player. He achieved the FIDE title of grandmaster in 1992, and his peak rating is 2670. Igor Khenkin has been one of the top 100 FIDE players for eight out of the past nine years. He participated in the FIDE World Chess Championship 2002, but was knocked out in the second round by Rustam Kasimdzhanov. In July 2006, he won the Andorra Open chess tournament with 7/9 points.

== Opening ==
New in Chess, one of the world's most respected chess publications, christened the 1.e4 c6 2.d4 d5 3.e5 c5 line in Caro–Kann Defence the "Arkell-Khenkin Line".

== Notable games ==
=== Igor Khenkin vs Alexey Shirov ===
Igor Khenkin faced Grandmaster Alexey Shirov in Borjomi 1988. The game played through the King's Indian Defense: the Petrosian Variation: 1.d4 Nf6 2.c4 g6 3.Nc3 Bg7 4.e4 d6 5.Nf3 O-O 6.Be2 e5 7.d5 a5 8.Bg5 h6 9.Bh4 Na6 10.Nd2 Qe8 11.O-O Nh7 12.a3 Bd7 13.b3 f5 14.exf5 Bxf5 15.g4 e4 16.Rc1 e3 17.fxe3 Qxe3+ 18.Bf2 Qg5 19.Kh1 Bd7 20.Nde4 Qe7 21.Qd3 Rae8 22.Ng3 Rf6 23.Kg2 Ng5 24.Bd4 Nc5 25.Bxf6 Nxd3 26.Bxe7 Nxc1 27.Bxg5 Nxe2 28.Ngxe2 hxg5 29.h3 c6 30.a4 cxd5 31.cxd5 Be5 32.Rf3 Kg7 33.Kf2 b5 34.axb5 Rb8 35.Ne4 Kh8 36.Rf7 Bxb5 37.Nf6 Bxf6 38.Rxf6 Bxe2 39.Kxe2 Rxb3 40.Rxd6 a4 41.Ra6 Kg7 42.Rxa4 Rxh3 43.Re4 Ra3 44.d6 Kf7 45.Rd4 Ra8 46.Rd5 Ke6 47.Rxg5 Kxd6 48.Rxg6+ Ke5 49.Kf3 Ra3+ ½–½.
