= Tilburg chess tournament =

Chess tournament series in the Netherlands

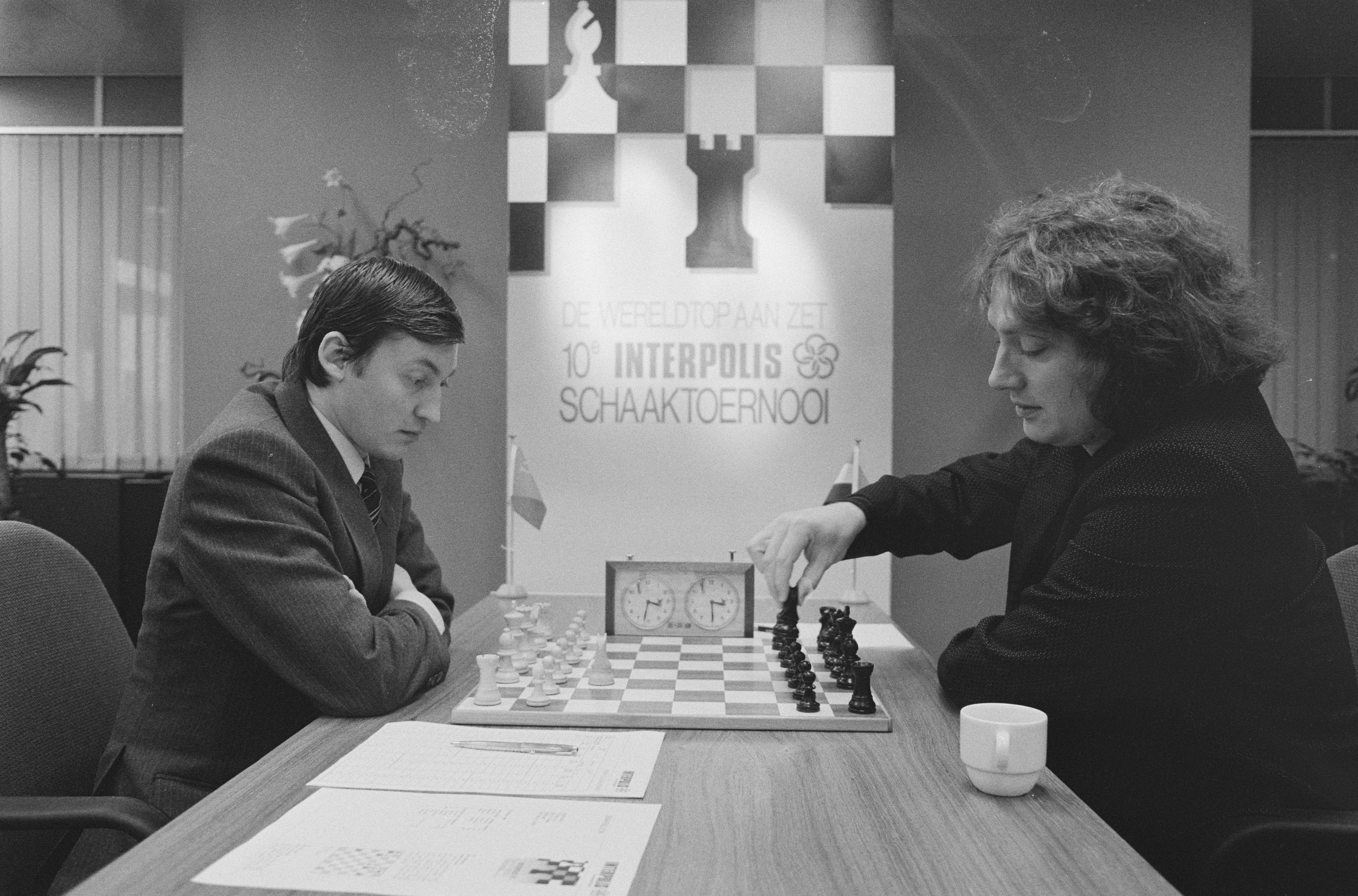
Jan Timman (r) of the host nation faces frequent winner Anatoly Karpov (l) in 1986.

The Tilburg chess tournament was a series of chess tournaments held in Tilburg, Netherlands. It was established in 1977 and ran continuously through 1994 under the sponsorship of Interpolis, an insurance company. Fontys Hogescholen shortly revived the tournament series from 1996 to 1998, when the last edition was played. Since 1994, there is another annual chess tournament taking place in Tilburg, which has the name De Stukkenjagers. The field is generally much weaker than the traditional Tilburg tournament.

== Winners ==
Tilburg chess tournament
#	Year	Winner
1	1977	Anatoly Karpov (Soviet Union)
2	1978	Lajos Portisch (Hungary)
3	1979	Anatoly Karpov (Soviet Union)
4	1980	Anatoly Karpov (Soviet Union)
5	1981	Alexander Beliavsky (Soviet Union)
6	1982	Anatoly Karpov (Soviet Union)
7	1983	Anatoly Karpov (Soviet Union)
8	1984	Tony Miles (England)
9	1985	Tony Miles (England); Robert Hübner (West Germany); Victor Korchnoi (Switzerland)
10	1986	Alexander Beliavsky (Soviet Union)
11	1987	Jan Timman (Netherlands)
12	1988	Anatoly Karpov (Soviet Union)
13	1989	Garry Kasparov (Soviet Union)
14	1990	Vassily Ivanchuk (Soviet Union); Gata Kamsky (United States)
15	1991	Garry Kasparov (Soviet Union)
16	1992	Michael Adams (England)
17	1993	Anatoly Karpov (Russia)
18	1994	Valery Salov (Russia)
1	1996	Jeroen Piket (Netherlands) (best on tie-break); Boris Gelfand (Belarus)
2	1997	Peter Svidler (Russia) (best on tie-break); Garry Kasparov (Russia); Vladimir Kramnik (Russia)
3	1998	Viswanathan Anand (India)

== 1977 ==
The first edition was a very strong all-grandmaster event of Category 14. It was a single round-robin tournament with twelve players. Karpov won the event.

Tilburg 1977 - cat.14 (2581)
#	Player	1	2	3	4	5	6	7	8	9	0	1	2	Total
1	Anatoly Karpov (Soviet Union)	*	1	½	½	½	1	½	1	1	½	½	1	8
2	Tony Miles (England)	0	*	½	½	½	½	1	0	1	1	1	1	7
3	Vlastimil Hort (Czechoslovakia)	½	½	*	½	½	½	½	½	½	½	1	½	6
4	Jan Timman (Netherlands)	½	½	½	*	½	1	½	½	0	½	½	1	6
5	Lubomir Kavalek (United States)	½	½	½	½	*	½	½	½	½	½	½	1	6
6	Robert Hübner (West Germany)	0	½	½	0	½	*	1	1	½	½	½	1	6
7	Svetozar Gligorić (Yugoslavia)	½	0	½	½	½	0	*	½	1	½	1	½	5½
8	Ulf Andersson (Sweden)	0	1	½	½	½	0	½	*	½	½	½	½	5
9	Yuri Balashov (Soviet Union)	0	0	½	1	½	½	0	½	*	1	½	½	5
10	Vasily Smyslov (Soviet Union)	½	0	½	½	½	½	½	½	0	*	½	½	4½
11	Gennadi Sosonko (Netherlands)	½	0	0	½	½	½	0	½	½	½	*	½	4
12	Fridrik Olafsson (Iceland)	0	0	½	0	0	0	½	½	½	½	½	*	3

== 1978 ==
The second edition was similar in strength to the first edition, again an all-grandmaster event of category 14. No Russian players participated as Karpov and Korchnoi were playing a match at that time and their proposed Russian replacements were not accepted. Portisch won the event.

Tilburg 1978 - cat.14 (2593)
#	Player	1	2	3	4	5	6	7	8	9	0	1	2	Total
1	Lajos Portisch (Hungary)	*	½	½	1	1	1	½	½	½	0	1	½	7
2	Jan Timman (Netherlands)	½	*	½	½	½	½	½	½	1	1	½	½	6½
3	Roman Dzindzichashvili (Israel)	½	½	*	1	0	½	½	½	½	½	½	1	6
4	Robert Hübner (West Germany)	0	½	0	*	½	½	½	1	1	1	½	½	6
5	Tony Miles (England)	0	½	1	½	*	0	0	½	1	½	1	1	6
6	Walter Browne (United States)	0	½	½	½	1	*	1	½	½	1	0	0	5½
7	Vlastimil Hort (Czechoslovakia)	½	½	½	½	1	0	*	½	0	½	½	1	5½
8	Boris Spassky (France)	½	½	½	0	½	½	½	*	0	1	1	½	5½
9	Bent Larsen (Denmark)	½	0	½	0	0	½	1	1	*	½	½	½	5
10	Ljubomir Ljubojević (Yugoslavia)	1	0	½	0	½	0	½	0	½	*	½	1	4½
11	Gennadi Sosonko (Netherlands)	0	½	½	½	0	1	½	0	½	½	*	½	4½
12	Zoltán Ribli (Hungary)	½	½	0	½	0	1	0	½	½	0	½	*	4

== 1979 ==
Tilburg 1979 - cat.15 (2605)
#	Player	1	2	3	4	5	6	7	8	9	0	1	2	Total
1	Anatoly Karpov (Soviet Union)	*	½	½	½	1	1	½	½	½	1	½	1	7½
2	Oleg Romanishin (Soviet Union)	½	*	½	½	0	½	1	1	½	1	½	1	7
3	Lajos Portisch (Hungary)	½	½	*	½	½	1	½	0	½	½	1	1	6½
4	Gyula Sax (Hungary)	½	½	½	*	½	0	½	1	½	½	½	1	6
5	Gennadi Sosonko (Netherlands)	0	1	½	½	*	1	½	0	1	0	½	½	5½
6	Bent Larsen (Denmark)	0	½	0	1	0	*	½	1	½	1	1	0	5½
7	Boris Spassky (France)	½	0	½	½	½	½	*	½	1	½	½	½	5½
8	Jan Timman (Netherlands)	½	0	1	0	1	0	½	*	½	½	½	1	5½
9	Robert Hübner (West Germany)	½	½	½	½	0	½	0	½	*	½	½	1	5
10	Vlastimil Hort (Czechoslovakia)	0	0	½	½	1	0	½	½	½	*	½	1	5
11	Lubomir Kavalek (United States)	½	½	0	½	½	0	½	½	½	½	*	½	4½
12	Vasily Smyslov (Soviet Union)	0	0	0	0	½	1	½	0	0	0	½	*	2½

== 1980 ==
Tilburg 1980 - cat.15 (2619)
#	Player	1	2	3	4	5	6	7	8	9	0	1	2	Total
1	Anatoly Karpov (Soviet Union)	*	½	1	½	1	½	½	0	1	1	1	½	7½
2	Lajos Portisch (Hungary)	½	*	½	½	½	1	½	1	½	½	½	1	7
3	Jan Timman (Netherlands)	0	½	*	½	½	½	½	1	½	½	1	1	6½
4	Gennadi Sosonko (Netherlands)	½	½	½	*	½	½	½	½	½	1	½	½	6
5	Boris Spassky (France)	0	½	½	½	*	0	½	1	1	1	½	½	6
6	Mikhail Tal (Soviet Union)	½	0	½	½	1	*	½	½	½	½	½	½	5½
7	Vlastimil Hort (Czechoslovakia)	½	½	½	½	½	½	*	0	½	½	½	½	5
8	Bent Larsen (Denmark)	1	0	0	½	0	½	1	*	½	0	1	½	5
9	Ulf Andersson (Sweden)	0	½	½	½	0	½	½	½	*	½	½	½	4½
10	Zoltán Ribli (Hungary)	0	½	½	0	0	½	½	1	½	*	½	½	4½
11	Robert Hübner (West Germany)	0	½	0	½	½	½	½	0	½	½	*	1	4½
12	Lubomir Kavalek (United States)	½	0	0	½	½	½	½	½	½	½	0	*	4

== 1981 ==
Tilburg 1981 - cat.15 (2608)
#	Player	1	2	3	4	5	6	7	8	9	0	1	2	Total
1	Alexander Beliavsky (Soviet Union)	*	½	0	1	½	½	½	½	1	1	1	1	7½
2	Tigran Petrosian (Soviet Union)	½	*	½	½	½	½	½	1	1	½	½	1	7
3	Lajos Portisch (Hungary)	1	½	*	½	1	0	½	½	0	1	1	½	6½
4	Jan Timman (Netherlands)	0	½	½	*	½	½	1	1	0	1	½	1	6½
5	Ljubomir Ljubojević (Yugoslavia)	½	½	0	½	*	½	½	½	½	1	1	½	6
6	Ulf Andersson (Sweden)	½	½	1	½	½	*	½	0	½	0	½	1	5½
7	Boris Spassky (France)	½	½	½	0	½	½	*	1	½	½	½	½	5½
8	Garry Kasparov (Soviet Union)	½	0	½	0	½	1	0	*	1	½	1	½	5½
9	Gennadi Sosonko (Netherlands)	0	0	1	1	½	½	½	0	*	0	½	½	4½
10	Bent Larsen (Denmark)	0	½	0	0	0	1	½	½	1	*	0	1	4½
11	Robert Hübner (West Germany)	0	½	0	½	0	½	½	0	½	1	*	½	4
12	Tony Miles (England)	0	0	½	0	½	0	½	½	½	0	½	*	3

== 1982 ==
Tilburg 1982 - cat.14 (2599)
#	Player	1	2	3	4	5	6	7	8	9	0	1	2	Total
1	Anatoly Karpov (Soviet Union)	*	½	½	½	1	½	1	0	½	1	1	1	7½
2	Jan Timman (Netherlands)	½	*	½	½	½	½	½	½	½	1	1	1	7
3	Ulf Andersson (Sweden)	½	½	*	½	½	½	½	½	1	½	½	1	6½
4	Gennadi Sosonko (Netherlands)	½	½	½	*	0	1	0	1	½	½	1	1	6½
5	Tigran Petrosian (Soviet Union)	0	½	½	1	*	½	0	1	1	½	½	½	6
6	Vasily Smyslov (Soviet Union)	½	½	½	0	½	*	1	½	½	1	½	½	6
7	John Nunn (England)	0	½	½	1	1	0	*	½	½	½	½	0	5
8	Lajos Portisch (Hungary)	1	½	½	0	0	½	½	*	0	½	½	1	5
9	Walter Browne (United States)	½	½	0	½	0	½	½	1	*	0	½	1	5
10	Robert Hübner (West Germany)	0	0	½	½	½	0	½	½	1	*	½	½	4½
11	Eugenio Torre (Philippines)	0	0	½	0	½	½	½	½	½	½	*	1	4½
12	Bent Larsen (Denmark)	0	0	0	0	½	½	1	0	0	½	0	*	2½

== 1983 ==
Tilburg 1983 - cat.15 (2613)
#	Player	1	2	3	4	5	6	7	8	9	0	1	2	Total
1	Anatoly Karpov (Soviet Union)	*	½	½	½	½	1	½	½	½	½	1	1	7
2	Ljubomir Ljubojević (Yugoslavia)	½	*	½	½	½	1	½	½	½	1	1	0	6½
3	Lajos Portisch (Hungary)	½	½	*	½	½	½	½	1	½	½	½	1	6½
4	Rafael Vaganian (Soviet Union)	½	½	½	*	½	½	1	1	½	0	0	1	6
5	Gennadi Sosonko (Netherlands)	½	½	½	½	*	0	½	½	½	1	1	½	6
6	Lev Polugaevsky (Soviet Union)	0	0	½	½	1	*	½	½	½	1	½	½	5½
7	Boris Spassky (France)	½	½	½	0	½	½	*	½	½	½	½	1	5½
8	Robert Hübner (West Germany)	½	½	0	0	½	½	½	*	½	½	1	1	5½
9	Ulf Andersson (Sweden)	½	½	½	½	½	½	½	½	*	½	½	0	5
10	Jan Timman (Netherlands)	½	0	½	1	0	0	½	½	½	*	½	1	5
11	Yasser Seirawan (United States)	0	0	½	1	0	½	½	0	½	½	*	½	4
12	John van der Wiel (Netherlands)	0	1	0	0	½	½	0	0	1	0	½	*	3½

== 1984 ==
Tilburg 1984 - cat.14 (2596)
#	Player	1	2	3	4	5	6	7	8	9	0	1	2	Total
1	Tony Miles (England)	*	½	½	½	½	½	1	1	½	1	1	1	8
2	Robert Hübner (West Germany)	½	*	½	½	½	½	½	½	1	1	½	½	6½
3	Vladimir Tukmakov (Soviet Union)	½	½	*	1	½	½	½	½	½	½	½	1	6½
4	Zoltán Ribli (Hungary)	½	½	0	*	½	½	½	1	½	1	1	½	6½
5	Alexander Beliavsky (Soviet Union)	½	½	½	½	*	1	0	½	½	½	1	1	6½
6	Ljubomir Ljubojević (Yugoslavia)	½	½	½	½	0	*	1	½	½	½	1	½	6
7	Lajos Portisch (Hungary)	0	½	½	½	1	0	*	½	½	0	1	1	5½
8	Jan Timman (Netherlands)	0	½	½	0	½	½	½	*	1	½	½	1	5½
9	Ulf Andersson (Sweden)	½	0	½	½	½	½	½	0	*	½	½	1	5
10	Vasily Smyslov (Soviet Union)	0	0	½	0	½	½	1	½	½	*	1	0	4½
11	Gennadi Sosonko (Netherlands)	0	½	½	0	0	0	0	½	½	0	*	1	3
12	John van der Wiel (Netherlands)	0	½	0	½	0	½	0	0	0	1	0	*	2½

== 1985 ==
Tilburg 1985 - cat.15 (2603)
#	Player	1	2	3	4	5	6	7	8	Total
1	Tony Miles (England)	**	0½	11	11	10	0½	1½	½½	8½
2	Robert Hübner (West Germany)	1½	**	½½	10	½½	½1	½½	½1	8½
3	Viktor Korchnoi (Switzerland)	00	½½	**	½½	½1	1½	11	½1	8½
4	Ljubomir Ljubojević (Yugoslavia)	00	01	½½	**	½1	½1	10	01	7
5	Lev Polugaevsky (Soviet Union)	01	½½	½0	½0	**	1½	0½	½½	6
6	Oleg Romanishin (Soviet Union)	1½	½0	0½	½0	0½	**	½½	1½	6
7	Jan Timman (Netherlands)	0½	½½	00	01	1½	½½	**	01	6
8	Roman Dzindzichashvili (United States)	½½	½0	½0	10	½½	0½	10	**	5½

== 1986 ==
Tilburg 1986 - cat.15 (2619)
#	Player	1	2	3	4	5	6	7	8	Total
1	Alexander Beliavsky (Soviet Union)	**	11	½1	0½	1½	½½	0½	½1	8½
2	Ljubomir Ljubojević (Yugoslavia)	00	**	½½	10	½½	1½	½1	11	8
3	Anatoly Karpov (Soviet Union)	½0	½½	**	½½	½½	1½	½½	½1	7½
4	Tony Miles (England)	1½	01	½½	**	01	½0	½½	01	7
5	Jan Timman (Netherlands)	0½	½½	½½	10	**	10	½½	½1	7
6	Lajos Portisch (Hungary)	½½	0½	0½	½1	01	**	½½	½1	7
7	Robert Hübner (West Germany)	1½	½0	½½	½½	½½	½½	**	0½	6½
8	Viktor Korchnoi (Switzerland)	½0	00	½0	10	½0	½0	1½	**	4½

== 1987 ==
Tilburg 1987 - cat.15 (2623)
#	Player	1	2	3	4	5	6	7	8	Total
1	Jan Timman (Netherlands)	**	½½	½½	1½	½1	½½	01	½1	8½
2	Predrag Nikolić (Yugoslavia)	½½	**	½1	01	½1	½½	½½	½½	8
3	Robert Hübner (West Germany)	½½	½0	**	11	½½	½½	½½	1½	8
4	Viktor Korchnoi (Switzerland)	0½	10	00	**	1½	1½	½1	1½	7½
5	Artur Jussupow (Soviet Union)	½0	½0	½½	0½	**	½½	1½	11	7
6	Ulf Andersson (Sweden)	½½	½½	½½	0½	½½	**	½½	½½	6½
7	Andrei Sokolov (Soviet Union)	10	½½	½½	½0	0½	½½	**	½½	6
8	Ljubomir Ljubojević (Yugoslavia)	½0	½½	0½	0½	00	½½	½½	**	4½

== 1988 ==
Tilburg 1988 - cat.15 (2627)
#	Player	1	2	3	4	5	6	7	8	Total
1	Anatoly Karpov (Soviet Union)	**	½½	½1	1½	11	½½	11	1½	10½
2	Nigel Short (England)	½½	**	0½	½½	½½	11	½1	½1	8½
3	Jóhann Hjartarson (Iceland)	½0	1½	**	½½	½0	½½	1½	10	7
4	Predrag Nikolić (Yugoslavia)	0½	½½	½½	**	½0	½1	½½	1½	7
5	Jan Timman (Netherlands)	00	½½	½1	½1	**	01	½0	½1	7
6	Robert Hübner (West Germany)	½½	00	½½	½0	10	**	½½	½½	5½
7	John van der Wiel (Netherlands)	00	½0	0½	½½	½1	½½	**	10	5½
8	Lajos Portisch (Hungary)	0½	½0	01	0½	½0	½½	01	**	5

== 1989 ==
Tilburg 1989 - cat.16 (2626)
#	Player	1	2	3	4	5	6	7	8	Total
1	Garry Kasparov (Soviet Union)	**	½1	½1	1½	1½	11	11	11	12
2	Viktor Korchnoi (Switzerland)	½0	**	½½	½½	½1	1½	1½	1½	8½
3	Ljubomir Ljubojević (Yugoslavia)	½0	½½	**	½½	1½	0½	01	½1	7
4	Gyula Sax (Hungary)	0½	½½	½½	**	01	½½	½½	1½	7
5	Vassily Ivanchuk (Soviet Union)	0½	½0	0½	10	**	1½	½½	½1	6½
6	Simen Agdestein (Norway)	00	0½	1½	½½	0½	**	½½	½½	5½
7	Jóhann Hjartarson (Iceland)	00	0½	10	½½	½½	½½	**	10	5½
8	Jeroen Piket (Netherlands)	00	0½	½0	0½	½0	½½	01	**	4

== 1990 ==
Tilburg 1990 - cat.16 (2643)
#	Player	1	2	3	4	5	6	7	8	Total
1	Gata Kamsky (United States)	**	½1	1½	½0	10	1½	1½	½½	8½
2	Vassily Ivanchuk (Soviet Union)	½0	**	½0	½1	11	½½	½1	1½	8½
3	Boris Gelfand (Soviet Union)	0½	½1	**	10	0½	11	½½	½1	8
4	Nigel Short (England)	½1	½0	01	**	10	½0	1½	½1	7½
5	Jan Timman (Netherlands)	01	00	1½	01	**	½½	0½	½1	6½
6	Ulf Andersson (Sweden)	0½	½½	00	½1	½½	**	½½	½1	6½
7	Predrag Nikolić (Yugoslavia)	0½	½0	½½	0½	1½	½½	**	½½	6
8	Yasser Seirawan (United States)	½½	0½	½0	½0	½0	½0	½½	**	4½

== 1991 ==
15th Tilburg Interpolis, 17 October – 4 November 1991, Tilburg, Netherlands, Category XVII (2664)
	Player	Rating	1	2	3	4	5	6	7	8	Total	TPR
1	Garry Kasparov (Soviet Union)	2770		½ ½	1 0	½ 1	½ ½	1 1	1 ½	1 1	10	2807
2	Nigel Short (England)	2650	½½		0 ½	½ ½	1 1	1 ½	½ ½	1 ½	8½	2746
3	Viswanathan Anand (India)	2650	0 1	1 ½		1 0	1 0	0 ½	1 ½	1 ½	8	2716
4	Anatoly Karpov (Soviet Union)	2730	½ 0	½ ½	0 1		½ 0	½ 1	½ 1	½ 1	7½	2684
5	Gata Kamsky (United States)	2595	½ ½	0 0	0 1	½ 1		1 0	½ ½	½ 1	7	2674
6	Jan Timman (Netherlands)	2630	0 0	0 ½	1 ½	½ 0	0 1		1 0	1 1	6½	2640
7	Viktor Korchnoi (Switzerland)	2610	0 ½	½ ½	0 ½	½ 0	½ ½	0 1		½ ½	5½	2592
8	Evgeny Bareev (Soviet Union)	2680	0 0	0 ½	0 ½	½ 0	½ 0	0 0	½ ½		3	2432

== 1992 ==
In 1992 the tournament was for the first time held in the knockout format and comprised three days per round. Game one on day one, game two on day two (both at classic time limits). Day three was a rest day, but for those tied 1-1 it was the day to play two more tie-break games (each with rapid time limit) and in a few cases, another two. The format was described by some commentators as very brutal. Anyone getting off to a slow start would be eliminated and sent home in just two or three days, such as happened to the entire Hungarian squad of Lajos Portisch, Gyula Sax, Zoltán Ribli, József Pintér and Peter Leko. Those who did not win cleanly in the initial two games of each round found fatigue a great problem, due to having to give up their rest days. The benefit over the old double round-robin format was that it opened up the potential for an unexpected winner, and this made it exciting for the spectators. The traditional format favours those highly graded players who win year after year by agreeing quick draws against their closest rivals and defeating the rest.

The 1992 edition had 111 participants, 94 in round one, with the 47 winners then being joined by 17 seeded players given a bye to round two. Round two therefore comprised 64 players, round three 32, and round four 16. Below are the results from round four onwards. At the time, this had the largest prize fund of any traditional tournament. Adams won 100,000 Dutch guilders (equivalent to US$207,000 in 2024), and the overall fund was 500,000 dg. The seeded players were given very generous conditions of a guaranteed 10,000 guilders to ensure their attendance.

First round
(Ukraine) Vassily Ivanchuk	3
(United States) Yasser Seirawan	1
(Germany) Artur Yusupov	1½
(United States) Gata Kamsky	2½
(Belarus) Boris Gelfand	1½
(Latvia) Edvīns Ķeņģis	½
(Russia) Sergei Tiviakov	½
(Switzerland) Viktor Korchnoi	1½
(Russia) Alexey Vyzmanavin	1
(Bosnia and Herzegovina) Predrag Nikolić	3
(England) Nigel Short	0
(Israel) Ilya Smirin	2
(Russia) Vasily Smyslov	2½
(Latvia) Evgeny Sveshnikov	3½
(Belarus) Andrei Kovalev	½
(England) Michael Adams	1½

Second round
(Ukraine) Vassily Ivanchuk	2½
(United States) Gata Kamsky	3½
(Belarus) Boris Gelfand	4
(Switzerland) Viktor Korchnoi	2
(Bosnia and Herzegovina) Predrag Nikolić	2
(Israel) Ilya Smirin	4
(Latvia) Evgeny Sveshnikov	½
(England) Michael Adams	1½

Semifinals
(United States) Gata Kamsky	2½
(Belarus) Boris Gelfand	3½
(Israel) Ilya Smirin	½
(England) Michael Adams	1½

Finals
(Belarus) Boris Gelfand	1½
(England) Michael Adams	2½

== 1993 ==
The 1993 edition was played in the same format as the 1992 edition with 112 participants; round one had 96 unseeded entrants, and 16 seeded players (with a bye) joined the winners in round two. Tie-break games were played at a time control of twenty minutes plus a ten-second increment. The prize fund was the same as last year: 500,000 Dutch guilders (100,000 for the winner) and minimum 10,000 dg. guaranteed to seeded players. Of the seventeen host country players that started, only two made it past the first round. They were joined by the seeded Jan Timman and Jeroen Piket. Paul van der Sterren declined to play after his request to be seeded was turned down.

Round of 128
2	GM Vasyl Ivanchuk (UKR) (2705)
bye
GM Ferdinand Hellers (SWE) (2560)	3½
GM Zoltán Ribli (HUN) (2610)	2½
GM Simen Agdestein (NOR) (2610)	3½
GM Roberto Cifuentes (NED) (2495)	2½
GM Sergey Dolmatov (RUS) (2630)	2½
GM Alonso Zapata (COL) (2555)	1½
15	GM Lev Polugaevsky (RUS) (2605)
bye
GM Vladimir Epishin (RUS) (2655)	1½
GM Lars Bo Hansen (DEN) (2560)	½
GM Alexander Shabalov (LAT) (2590)	2½
GM Vasily Smyslov (RUS) (2520)	1½
GM Anatoly Vaisser (FRA) (2580)	3
GM Utut Adianto (INA) (2510)	1
7	GM Kiril Georgiev (BUL) (2660)
bye
GM Victor Bologan (MDA) (2510)	1½
GM Mikhail Krasenkov (RUS) (2595)	½
GM Vladimir Akopian (ARM) (2600)	1½
GM Larry Christiansen (USA) (2555)	½
GM Branko Damljanović (FRY) (2570)	1½
IM Gert-Jan de Boer (NED) (2435)	½
10	GM Michael Adams (ENG) (2630)
bye
GM Tony Miles (ENG) (2565)	2
WIM Esther de Kleuver (NED) (2150)	0
IM Alexander Morozevich (RUS) (2545)	2½
GM John van der Wiel (NED) (2565)	1½
GM Loek van Wely (NED) (2590)	2
GM Efim Geller (RUS) (2505)	0
3	GM Alexei Shirov (LAT) (2685)
bye
GM Nick de Firmian (USA) (2545)	2
IM Đào Thiên Hải (VIE) (2565)	0
IM Dejan Mozetic (FRY) (2580)	2
IM Gert Ligterink (NED) (2435)	0
IM Peter Leko (HUN) (2555)	1½
GM Vadim Ruban (RUS) (2590)	½
14	GM Ivan Sokolov (BIH) (2610)
bye
GM Eduardas Rozentalis (LTU) (2600)	3
IM Darryl Johansen (AUS) (2495)	1
GM Ulf Andersson (SWE) (2625)	2½
IM Luc Winants (BEL) (2490)	1½
GM Gilberto Milos (BRA) (2565)	2½
GM Eric Lobron (GER) (2575)	1½
6	GM Evgeny Bareev (RUS) (2660)
bye
GM Yevgeniy Vladimirov (KAZ) (2585)	1½
GM Andrei Kharlov (RUS) (2535)	½
GM Yuri Razuvaev (RUS) (2560)	1½
GM Grigory Serper (UZB) (2575)	½
GM Ian Rogers (AUS) (2595)	4
IM Johannes van Mil (NED) (2435)	2
11	GM Zurab Azmaiparashvili (GEO) (2630)
bye
GM Ognjen Cvitan (CRO) (2550)	3½
GM Evgeny Sveshnikov (RUS) (2570)	2½
GM Ilya Smirin (ISR) (2640)	3
GM Friso Nijboer (NED) (2555)	1
GM Josif Dorfman (FRA) (2555)	1½
GM Yasser Seirawan (USA) (2575)	½
1	GM Anatoly Karpov (RUS) (2760)
bye
GM Oleg Romanishin (UKR) (2615)	2
IM Manuel Bosboom (NED) (2440)	0
GM Alexey Vyzmanavin (RUS) (2605)	2
GM Stefan Đurić (FRY) (2495)	0
GM Alexander Chernin (HUN) (2615)	1½
GM Hans Ree (NED) (2445)	½
16	GM Jeroen Piket (NED) (2590)
bye
GM Gerald Hertneck (GER) (2565)	1½
GM Igor Khenkin (ISR) (2570)	½
GM Grigory Kaidanov (RUS) (2640)	2
GM Viktor Kupreichik (BLR) (2535)	0
GM Daniel Campora (ARG) (2540)	1½
GM Lembit Oll (EST) (2595)	½
9	GM Artur Yusupov (GER) (2630)
bye
GM Julian Hodgson (ENG) (2625)	1½
GM Zurab Sturua (GEO) (2540)	½
GM Christopher Lutz (GER) (2605)	2
Alexander Jongsma (NED) (2295)	0
GM Curt Hansen (DEN) (2590)	1½
IM Zdenko Krnić (FRY) (2425)	½
8	GM Gata Kamsky (USA) (2645)
bye
GM Boris Alterman (ISR) (2585)	2
IM Leon Pliester (NED) (2420)	0
IM Suat Atalık (TUR) (2535)	1½
GM Vladimir Tukmakov (UKR) (2600)	½
FM Erik Knoppert (NED) (2375)	2
IM Marinus Kuijf (NED) (2445)	0
13	GM Jan Timman (NED) (2620)
bye
GM Margeir Pétursson (ISL) (2560)	1½
GM József Pintér (HUN) (2575)	½
GM Alexander Beliavsky (UKR) (2635)	1½
IM Paul Boersma (NED) (2365)	½
GM Viktor Korchnoi (SUI) (2625)	2½
GM Igor Štohl (SVK) (2545)	1½
4	GM Valery Salov (RUS) (2685)
bye
GM Leonid Yudasin (ISR) (2605)	2½
GM Artashes Minasian (ARM) (2535)	1½
GM Predrag Nikolić (BIH) (2625)	2
GM Andrei Kovalev (BLR) (2545)	0
GM Mikhail Gurevich (BEL) (2605)	1½
GM Mihail Marin (ROM) (2515)	½
12	GM Joël Lautier (FRA) (2620)
bye
GM Alex Yermolinsky (USA) (2605)	2
IM Martin Martens (NED) (2430)	0
GM Rafael Vaganian (ARM) (2615)	1½
GM David Bronstein (RUS) (2395)	½
GM Jon Speelman (ENG) (2605)	1½
IM Gerard Welling (NED) (2400)	½
5	GM Boris Gelfand (BLR) (2670)
bye
GM Alexey Dreev (RUS) (2570)	2
Peter Boel (NED)	0
GM Vladimir Malaniuk (UKR) (2635)	1½
GM Sergey Smagin (RUS) (2550)	½
GM Jóhann Hjartarson (ISL) (2605)	2½
GM Giorgi Giorgadze (GEO) (2555)	1½

Round of 64
2	Vasyl Ivanchuk (UKR)	2½
Ferdinand Hellers (SWE)	1½
Simen Agdestein (NOR)	2½
Sergey Dolmatov (RUS)	1½
15	Lev Polugaevsky (RUS)	½
Vladimir Epishin (RUS)	1½
Alexander Shabalov (LAT)	1½
Anatoly Vaisser (FRA)	½
7	Kiril Georgiev (BUL)	1½
Victor Bologan (MDA)	½
Vladimir Akopian (ARM)	1½
Branko Damljanović (FRY)	½
10	Michael Adams (ENG)	1½
Tony Miles (ENG)	½
Alexander Morozevich (RUS)	1½
Loek van Wely (NED)	½
3	Alexei Shirov (LAT)	1½
Nick de Firmian (USA)	½
Dejan Mozetic (FRY)	1½
Peter Leko (HUN)	½
14	Ivan Sokolov (BIH)	1½
Eduardas Rozentalis (LTU)	2½
Ulf Andersson (SWE)	2
Gilberto Milos (BRA)	0
6	Evgeny Bareev (RUS)	2
Yevgeniy Vladimirov (KAZ)	0
Yuri Razuvaev (RUS)	1½
Ian Rogers (AUS)	½
11	Zurab Azmaiparashvili (GEO)	1½
Ognjen Cvitan (CRO)	2½
Ilya Smirin (ISR)	4
Josif Dorfman (FRA)	2
1	Anatoly Karpov (RUS)	1½
Oleg Romanishin (UKR)	½
Alexey Vyzmanavin (RUS)	2½
Alexander Chernin (HUN)	1½
16	Jeroen Piket (NED)	2½
Gerald Hertneck (GER)	1½
Grigory Kaidanov (RUS)	2½
Daniel Campora (ARG)	1½
9	Artur Yusupov (GER)	1½
Julian Hodgson (ENG)	½
Christopher Lutz (GER)	2½
Curt Hansen (DEN)	1½
8	Gata Kamsky (USA)	2
Boris Alterman (ISR)	0
Suat Atalık (TUR)	2
Erik Knoppert (NED)	0
13	Jan Timman (NED)	1½
Margeir Pétursson (ISL)	½
Alexander Beliavsky (UKR)	1½
Viktor Korchnoi (SUI)	½
4	Valery Salov (RUS)	½
Leonid Yudasin (ISR)	1½
Predrag Nikolić (BIH)	1½
Mikhail Gurevich (BEL)	½
12	Joël Lautier (FRA)	½
Alex Yermolinsky (USA)	1½
Rafael Vaganian (ARM)	2
Jon Speelman (ENG)	0
5	Boris Gelfand (BLR)	½
Alexey Dreev (RUS)	1½
Vladimir Malaniuk (UKR)	3½
Jóhann Hjartarson (ISL)	2½

Round of 32
2	Vasyl Ivanchuk (UKR)	3
Simen Agdestein (NOR)	1
Vladimir Epishin (RUS)	2
Alexander Shabalov (LAT)	0
7	Kiril Georgiev (BUL)	1½
Vladimir Akopian (ARM)	½
10	Michael Adams (ENG)	0
Alexander Morozevich (RUS)	2
3	Alexei Shirov (LAT)	2
Dejan Mozetic (FRY)	0
Eduardas Rozentalis (LTU)	4½
Ulf Andersson (SWE)	3½
6	Evgeny Bareev (RUS)	1½
Yuri Razuvaev (RUS)	½
Ognjen Cvitan (CRO)	1½
Ilya Smirin (ISR)	½
1	Anatoly Karpov (RUS)	3
Alexey Vyzmanavin (RUS)	1
16	Jeroen Piket (NED)	½
Grigory Kaidanov (RUS)	1½
9	Artur Yusupov (GER)	2
Christopher Lutz (GER)	0
8	Gata Kamsky (USA)	2
Suat Atalık (TUR)	0
13	Jan Timman (NED)	½
Alexander Beliavsky (UKR)	1½
Leonid Yudasin (ISR)	2½
Predrag Nikolić (BIH)	3½
Alex Yermolinsky (USA)	½
Rafael Vaganian (ARM)	1½
Alexey Dreev (RUS)	1½
Vladimir Malaniuk (UKR)	½

Round of 16
2	Vasyl Ivanchuk (UKR)	1½
Vladimir Epishin (RUS)	½
7	Kiril Georgiev (BUL)	3
Alexander Morozevich (RUS)	1
3	Alexei Shirov (LAT)	1½
Eduardas Rozentalis (LTU)	½
6	Evgeny Bareev (RUS)	2
Ognjen Cvitan (CRO)	0
1	Anatoly Karpov (RUS)	2½
Grigory Kaidanov (RUS)	1½
9	Artur Yusupov (GER)	2½
8	Gata Kamsky (USA)	1½
Alexander Beliavsky (UKR)	1½
Predrag Nikolić (BIH)	½
Rafael Vaganian (ARM)	2½
Alexey Dreev (RUS)	1½

Quarterfinals
2	Vasyl Ivanchuk (UKR)	3
7	Kiril Georgiev (BUL)	1
3	Alexei Shirov (LAT)	2
6	Evgeny Bareev (RUS)	0
1	Anatoly Karpov (RUS)	1½
9	Artur Yusupov (GER)	½
Alexander Beliavsky (UKR)	2½
Rafael Vaganian (ARM)	1½

Semifinals
2	Vasyl Ivanchuk (UKR)	2½
3	Alexei Shirov (LAT)	1½
Finals
2	Vasyl Ivanchuk (UKR)	1½
1	Anatoly Karpov (RUS)	2½
1	Anatoly Karpov (RUS)	1½
Alexander Beliavsky (UKR)	½

== 1994 ==
The final edition to be organised under Interpolis' sponsorship was another large knockout tournament.

At the opening ceremony, a spokesman for Interpolis shocked the audience with an announcement that the company was reconsidering its chess and other public relations activities, following a total merger with Rabobank. FIDE President Florencio Campomanes attended the opening, primarily to lend support to the FIDE Women's Candidates tournament, which was being held at Tilburg alongside the Interpolis event.

The event commenced with a first round of 112 participants and the 56 winners were then joined by eight seeded players to make up a 64-player second round. The seeded players were Karpov (Elo rating 2780), Salov (2710), Ivanchuk (2695), Bareev (2695), Khalifman (2645), Epishin (2650), Timman (2635), and K. Georgiev (2615).

Due to a clash with another strong tournament in Horgen, the line-up was slightly depleted this time. Garry Kasparov, Alexei Shirov, Artur Yusupov, Viktor Korchnoi, Joël Lautier, Boris Gelfand, Peter Leko and Tony Miles were among those who favoured the rival event. Additionally, some Russian players were staying at home to prepare for their national championship, a precursor to selection for the Olympiad team.

Everyone was surprised to see the return of the Brazilian GM Henrique Mecking, a former world-class player, who had suffered a life-threatening condition some eighteen years previously and had been in a slow recovery ever since.

Held at the Interpolis headquarters, round one heralded the largest number of 'big reputation' casualties since the introduction of the knockout format. Alexander Beliavsky, Victor Bologan, Mikhail Gurevich, Curt Hansen, Lembit Oll, Alon Greenfeld, Ilya Smirin, Veselin Topalov and home favourite Jeroen Piket all had to pack their bags after just three days.

As before, each round comprised two (classic time limit) games on days one and two, followed by a rest day, which was also the day to conclude tie-breaks (starting with pairs of rapid time limit games and followed, if necessary, with blitz games).

Round of 128
1	GM Anatoly Karpov (RUS) (2780)
bye
GM Alexander Beliavsky (UKR) (2640)	½
GM Bojan Kurajica (BIH) (2565)	1½
GM Alexey Vyzmanavin (RUS) (2610)	3½
GM Karel Mokrý (CZE) (2530)	2½
GM Anatoly Vaisser (FRA) (2575)	0
GM António Antunes (POR) (2510)	2
GM Jaan Ehlvest (EST) (2600)	2
GM Matthias Wahls (GER) (2540)	0
GM Ilya Smirin (ISR) (2615)	½
GM Vadim Ruban (RUS) (2560)	1½
GM Suat Atalık (TUR) (2535)	½
GM Alexander Shabalov (USA) (2600)	1½
GM Mikhail Gurevich (BEL) (2620)	½
GM Hannes Stefánsson (ISL) (2560)	1½
8	GM Kiril Georgiev (BUL) (2615)
bye
GM Larry Christiansen (USA) (2575)	3
GM Andrei Kovalev (BLR) (2525)	1
GM Hans Ree (NED) (2440)	1
IM Alexander Morozevich (RUS) (2575)	3
FM Erik Knoppert (NED) (2380)	1
GM Vadim Milov (ISR) (2590)	3
GM Ivan Sokolov (BIH) (2625)	1½
GM Loek van Wely (NED) (2560)	½
GM Boris Alterman (ISR) (2585)	2
IM Dimitri Reinderman (NED) (2450)	0
GM Rafael Vaganian (ARM) (2645)	1½
GM Giorgi Giorgadze (GEO) (2565)	½
IM Johannes van Mil (NED) (2490)	½
GM Yury Dokhoian (RUS) (2580)	1½
GM Henrique Mecking (BRA) (2575)	1½
GM Alexey Dreev (RUS) (2650)	2½
GM Boris Gulko (USA) (2590)	3
GM Branko Damljanović (FRY) (2505)	4
6	GM Vladimir Epishin (RUS) (2650)
bye
GM Jeroen Piket (NED) (2640)	0
IM Dejan Mozetic (FRY) (2550)	2
GM Zoltán Almási (HUN) (2620)	3
IM Sergey Ionov (RUS) (2530)	1
GM Lars Bo Hansen (DEN) (2580)	1½
GM Xie Jun (CHN) (2515)	½
GM Daniel Cámpora (ARG) (2560)	½
GM Gerald Hertneck (GER) (2605)	1½
GM Vereslav Eingorn (UKR) (2585)	½
IM Marinus Kuijf (NED) (2425)	1½
GM Vladimir Tukmakov (UKR) (2565)	1½
GM Veselin Topalov (BUL) (2645)	½
GM Jon Speelman (ENG) (2600)	2
GM Dmitry Gurevich (USA) (2535)	0
GM Smbat Lputian (ARM) (2590)	1½
GM Dibyendu Barua (IND) (2495)	½
GM Helgi Ólafsson (ISL) (2520)	1½
IM Vadim Zvjaginsev (RUS) (2585)	½
GM Utut Adianto (INA) (2520)	1½
GM Andrei Sokolov (RUS) (2580)	½
4	GM Evgeny Bareev (RUS) (2675)
bye
GM Zoltán Ribli (HUN) (2605)	2½
GM Ľubomír Ftáčnik (SVK) (2570)	1½
GM Mikhail Krasenkov (RUS) (2595)	½
IM Thomas Luther (GER) (2520)	1½
GM Lajos Portisch (HUN) (2610)	3
GM Spyridon Skembris (GRE) (2525)	1
GM Victor Bologan (MDA) (2600)	2½
IM Vladislav Tkachiev (KAZ) (2535)	3½
2	GM Valery Salov (RUS) (2710)
bye
GM Ye Jiangchuan (CHN) (2575)	3½
GM Roberto Cifuentes (NED) (2490)	2½
IM Liafbern Riemersma (NED) (2440)	1½
GM Grigory Serper (UZB) (2575)	2½
GM Mihail Marin (ROM) (2520)	½
GM Alex Yermolinsky (USA) (2590)	1½
GM Ulf Andersson (SWE) (2620)	2
GM Zigurds Lanka (LAT) (2540)	0
GM Elmar Magerramov (AZE) (2580)	½
IM Dražen Sermek (SLO) (2515)	1½
GM Milan Draško (FRY) (2520)	1
GM Igor Khenkin (ISR) (2580)	3
7	GM Jan Timman (NED) (2635)
bye
Jop Delemarre (NED)	0
GM Evgeny Sveshnikov (RUS) (2585)	2
IM Leonid Yurtaev (KGZ) (2530)	½
GM Vladimir Akopian (ARM) (2630)	1½
GM Evgeny Pigusov (RUS) (2575)	1½
IM Mark van der Werf (NED) (2430)	½
GM Oleg Romanishin (UKR) (2605)	3½
GM Vasilios Kotronias (GRE) (2545)	2½
GM Ognjen Cvitan (CRO) (2585)	1½
WGM Nana Alexandria (GEO) (2325)	½
GM Pavel Blatný (CZE) (2485)	½
GM Edvīns Ķeņģis (LAT) (2580)	1½
3	GM Vasyl Ivanchuk (UKR) (2695)
bye
GM Vasily Smyslov (RUS) (2510)	1½
GM Yasser Seirawan (USA) (2585)	½
GM Lev Psakhis (ISR) (2615)	3
GM Aleksandr Shneider (UKR) (2535)	1
GM Friso Nijboer (NED) (2510)	1
GM Alexander Nenashev (UZB) (2575)	3
GM Yuri Razuvaev (RUS) (2550)	3½
GM Alexander Chernin (HUN) (2615)	4½
GM Curt Hansen (DEN) (2605)	2
GM Uwe Bönsch (GER) (2540)	4
GM Lembit Oll (EST) (2615)	1½
GM Markus Stangl (GER) (2535)	2½
GM Aleksander Wojtkiewicz (POL) (2560)	1½
GM Zurab Azmaiparashvili (GEO) (2625)	2½
GM Leonid Yudasin (ISR) (2625)	2½
GM Ian Rogers (AUS) (2560)	1½
IM Gert-Jan de Boer (NED) (2435)	½
GM Yevgeniy Vladimirov (KAZ) (2580)	1½
GM John van der Wiel (NED) (2555)	2½
GM Igor Glek (RUS) (2615)	3½
IM Zdenko Krnić (FRY) (2425)	½
GM Eric Lobron (GER) (2580)	1½
5	GM Alexander Khalifman (RUS) (2645)
bye
GM Peter Svidler (RUS) (2550)	4
GM Alon Greenfeld (ISR) (2600)	3
GM Jóhann Hjartarson (ISL) (2585)	1½
IM Albert Blees (NED) (2420)	½
GM Eduardas Rozentalis (LTU) (2595)	2½
GM Lars Karlsson (SWE) (2500)	1½

Round of 64
1	Anatoly Karpov (RUS)	3½
Bojan Kurajica (BIH)	2½
Alexey Vyzmanavin (RUS)	½
António Antunes (POR)	1½
Jaan Ehlvest (EST)	1½
Vadim Ruban (RUS)	½
Alexander Shabalov (USA)	1½
Hannes Stefánsson (ISL)	½
8	Kiril Georgiev (BUL)	1½
Larry Christiansen (USA)	½
Alexander Morozevich (RUS)	3
Vadim Milov (ISR)	1
Ivan Sokolov (BIH)	2
Boris Alterman (ISR)	0
Rafael Vaganian (ARM)	2½
Yury Dokhoian (RUS)	1½
Alexey Dreev (RUS)	1½
Branko Damljanović (FRY)	½
6	Vladimir Epishin (RUS)	1½
Dejan Mozetic (FRY)	½
Zoltán Almási (HUN)	1½
Lars Bo Hansen (DEN)	½
Gerald Hertneck (GER)	½
Marinus Kuijf (NED)	1½
Vladimir Tukmakov (UKR)	3
Jon Speelman (ENG)	1
Smbat Lputian (ARM)	1½
Helgi Ólafsson (ISL)	½
Utut Adianto (INA)	1
4	Evgeny Bareev (RUS)	3
Zoltán Ribli (HUN)	½
Thomas Luther (GER)	1½
Lajos Portisch (HUN)	3½
Vladislav Tkachiev (KAZ)	2½
2	Valery Salov (RUS)	2½
Ye Jiangchuan (CHN)	1½
Grigory Serper (UZB)	3½
Alex Yermolinsky (USA)	2½
Ulf Andersson (SWE)	½
Dražen Sermek (SLO)	1½
Igor Khenkin (ISR)	3½
7	Jan Timman (NED)	2½
Evgeny Sveshnikov (RUS)	½
Vladimir Akopian (ARM)	1½
Evgeny Pigusov (RUS)	3
Oleg Romanishin (UKR)	1
Ognjen Cvitan (CRO)	2½
Edvīns Ķeņģis (LAT)	1½
3	Vasyl Ivanchuk (UKR)	4
Vasily Smyslov (RUS)	2
Lev Psakhis (ISR)	1½
Alexander Nenashev (UZB)	2½
Alexander Chernin (HUN)	2½
Uwe Bönsch (GER)	1½
Markus Stangl (GER)	1
Zurab Azmaiparashvili (GEO)	3
Leonid Yudasin (ISR)	3
Yevgeniy Vladimirov (KAZ)	1
Igor Glek (RUS)	1½
Eric Lobron (GER)	½
5	Alexander Khalifman (RUS)	2½
Peter Svidler (RUS)	1½
Jóhann Hjartarson (ISL)	4
Eduardas Rozentalis (LTU)	3

Round of 32
1	Anatoly Karpov (RUS)	2
António Antunes (POR)	0
Jaan Ehlvest (EST)	½
Alexander Shabalov (USA)	1½
8	Kiril Georgiev (BUL)	1½
Alexander Morozevich (RUS)	½
Ivan Sokolov (BIH)	2
Rafael Vaganian (ARM)	0
Alexey Dreev (RUS)	4
6	Vladimir Epishin (RUS)	2
Zoltán Almási (HUN)	2
Marinus Kuijf (NED)	0
Vladimir Tukmakov (UKR)	4
Smbat Lputian (ARM)	2
4	Evgeny Bareev (RUS)	2½
Thomas Luther (GER)	1½
Lajos Portisch (HUN)	½
2	Valery Salov (RUS)	1½
Grigory Serper (UZB)	2
Dražen Sermek (SLO)	0
Igor Khenkin (ISR)	½
Vladimir Akopian (ARM)	1½
Evgeny Pigusov (RUS)	2½
Ognjen Cvitan (CRO)	1½
3	Vasyl Ivanchuk (UKR)	2
Alexander Nenashev (UZB)	0
Alexander Chernin (HUN)	2½
Zurab Azmaiparashvili (GEO)	3½
Leonid Yudasin (ISR)	5
Igor Glek (RUS)	4
5	Alexander Khalifman (RUS)	1½
Jóhann Hjartarson (ISL)	½

Round of 16
1	Anatoly Karpov (RUS)	2
Alexander Shabalov (USA)	0
8	Kiril Georgiev (BUL)	3½
Ivan Sokolov (BIH)	2½
Alexey Dreev (RUS)	1½
Zoltán Almási (HUN)	½
Vladimir Tukmakov (UKR)	1½
4	Evgeny Bareev (RUS)	2½
2	Valery Salov (RUS)	1½
Grigory Serper (UZB)	½
Vladimir Akopian (ARM)	1½
Evgeny Pigusov (RUS)	½
3	Vasyl Ivanchuk (UKR)	2½
Zurab Azmaiparashvili (GEO)	1½
Leonid Yudasin (ISR)	½
5	Alexander Khalifman (RUS)	1½

Quarterfinals
1	Anatoly Karpov (RUS)	2
8	Kiril Georgiev (BUL)	0
Alexey Dreev (RUS)	½
4	Evgeny Bareev (RUS)	1½
2	Valery Salov (RUS)	1½
Vladimir Akopian (ARM)	½
3	Vasyl Ivanchuk (UKR)	4
5	Alexander Khalifman (RUS)	2

Semifinals
1	Anatoly Karpov (RUS)	½
4	Evgeny Bareev (RUS)	1½
Finals
4	Evgeny Bareev (RUS)	½
2	Valery Salov (RUS)	1½
2	Valery Salov (RUS)	2½
3	Vasyl Ivanchuk (UKR)	1½

== 1996 ==
1st Tilburg Fontys, 10 – 23 October 1996, Tilburg, Netherlands, Category XVI (2648)
	Player	Rating	1	2	3	4	5	6	7	8	9	10	11	12	Total	SB	TPR	Place
1	Jeroen Piket (Netherlands)	2580		½	1	1	½	½	½	½	½	½	1	½	7	38.00	2756	1–2
2	Boris Gelfand (Belarus)	2665	½		1	½	½	½	1	1	½	½	½	½	7	38.00	2748	1–2
3	Alexei Shirov (Spain)	2685	0	0		0	1	½	1	½	1	1	½	1	6½		2710	3
4	Loek van Wely (Netherlands)	2605	0	½	1		½	1	½	0	1	½	½	½	6	32.25	2688	4–5
5	Peter Leko (Hungary)	2630	½	½	0	½		0	½	½	½	1	1	1	6	30.25	2686	4–5
6	Anatoly Karpov (Russia)	2775	½	½	½	0	1		½	½	0	½	1	½	5½	30.25	2636	6–7
7	Michael Adams (England)	2685	½	0	0	½	½	½		1	½	½	½	1	5½	28.00	2645	6–7
8	IM Emil Sutovsky (Israel)	2565	½	0	½	1	½	½	0		½	½	0	1	5		2619	8
9	Zoltán Almási (Hungary)	2655	½	½	0	0	½	1	½	½		½	½	0	4½	25.25	2582	9–11
10	Peter Svidler (Russia)	2650	½	½	0	½	0	½	½	½	½		½	½	4½	24.50	2583	9–11
11	Joël Lautier (France)	2620	0	½	½	½	0	0	½	1	½	½		½	4½	24.00	2585	9–11
12	Judit Polgár (Hungary)	2665	½	½	0	½	0	½	0	0	1	½	½		4		2544	12

== 1997 ==
2nd Tilburg Fontys, 26 September – 10 October 1997, Tilburg, Netherlands, Category XVII (2667)
	Player	Rating	1	2	3	4	5	6	7	8	9	10	11	12	Total	SB	TPR	Place
1	Peter Svidler (Russia)	2660		1	½	½	½	½	1	½	½	1	1	1	8	39.50	2844	1–3
2	Garry Kasparov (Russia)	2820	0		½	½	1	1	1	½	1	½	1	1	8	38.25	2829	1–3
3	Vladimir Kramnik (Russia)	2770	½	½		½	½	½	1	1	1	½	1	1	8	38.00	2834	1–3
4	Michael Adams (England)	2680	½	½	½		½	½	½	1	½	1	½	1	7	34.50	2769	4–5
5	Peter Leko (Hungary)	2635	½	0	½	½		½	½	1	1	½	1	1	7	32.00	2773	4–5
6	Judit Polgár (Hungary)	2670	½	0	½	½	½		1	½	½	1	½	½	6		2704	6
7	Alexei Shirov (Spain)	2700	0	0	0	½	½	0		½	1	1	½	1	5		2629	7
8	Joël Lautier (France)	2660	½	½	0	0	0	½	½		½	0	1	1	4½	19.75	2604	8–9
9	Loek van Wely (Netherlands)	2655	½	0	0	½	0	½	0	½		½	1	1	4½	18.75	2603	8–9
10	Alexander Onischuk (Ukraine)	2625	0	½	½	0	½	0	0	1	½		½	½	4		2570	10
11	Jeroen Piket (Netherlands)	2630	0	0	0	½	0	½	½	0	0	½		½	2½		2460	11
12	IM Tal Shaked (United States)	2500	0	0	0	0	0	½	0	0	0	½	½		1½		2374	12

== 1998 ==
3rd Tilburg Fontys, 24 October – 5 November 1998, Tilburg, Netherlands, Category XVIII (2680)
	Player	Rating	1	2	3	4	5	6	7	8	9	10	11	12	Total	SB	TPR	Place
1	Viswanathan Anand (India)	2795		½	½	½	1	½	1	½	½	½	1	1	7½		2803	1
2	Peter Leko (Hungary)	2665	½		½	½	1	½	1	½	½	1	½	½	7		2784	2
3	Matthew Sadler (England)	2660	½	½		½	½	½	1	½	½	½	½	½	6	32.75	2718	3–5
4	Vadim Zvjaginsev (Russia)	2650	½	½	½		0	1	½	½	½	½	1	½	6	32.00	2719	3–5
5	Vladimir Kramnik (Russia)	2780	0	0	½	1		½	½	½	½	½	1	1	6	29.75	2707	3–5
6	Jeroen Piket (Netherlands)	2605	½	½	½	0	½		½	0	1	½	1	½	5½	29.50	2687	6–7
7	Michael Adams (England)	2715	0	0	0	½	½	½		1	½	1	½	1	5½	26.50	2677	6–7
8	Peter Svidler (Russia)	2710	½	½	½	½	½	1	0		1	0	0	½	5	28.50	2642	8–9
9	Loek van Wely (Netherlands)	2635	½	½	½	½	½	0	½	0		½	½	1	5	27.00	2649	8–9
10	Veselin Topalov (Bulgaria)	2700	½	0	½	½	½	½	0	1	½		0	½	4½	24.75	2614	10–11
11	Joël Lautier (France)	2625	0	½	½	0	0	0	½	1	½	1		½	4½	23.00	2620	10–11
12	Viktor Korchnoi (Switzerland)	2625	0	½	½	½	0	½	0	½	0	½	½		3½		2552	12
