= Hoogovens Wijk aan Zee Chess Tournament 1996 =

Chess tournament

- Venue: Wijk aan Zee

The Hoogovens Wijk aan Zee Steel Chess Tournament 1996 was the 58th edition of the Hoogovens Wijk aan Zee Chess Tournament. It was held in Wijk aan Zee in January 1996 and was won by Vasyl Ivanchuk.

After switching to knockout matches in 1993 and 1995, the tournament reverted to its traditional round-robin format, which it has maintained ever since.

Top-seed Vasyl Ivanchuk finished unbeaten, a point ahead of Viswanathan Anand.

58th Hoogovens tournament, group A, 13–28 January 1996, Wijk aan Zee, Netherlands, Category XVII (2656)
	Player	Rating	1	2	3	4	5	6	7	8	9	10	11	12	13	14	Total	TPR	Place
1	Vasyl Ivanchuk (Ukraine)	2735		½	1	½	½	1	½	1	1	½	½	½	½	1	9	2791	1
2	Viswanathan Anand (India)	2725	½		0	1	½	0	1	1	½	1	1	½	½	½	8	2738	2
3	Veselin Topalov (Bulgaria)	2700	0	1		½	½	0	½	1	½	½	½	1	1	½	7½	2710	3
4	Michael Adams (England)	2660	½	0	½		1	1	0	½	0	½	½	1	1	½	7	2685	4–7
5	Alexey Dreev (Russia)	2670	½	½	½	0		½	½	0	1	½	1	½	1	½	7	2684	4–7
6	Ivan Sokolov (Bosnia and Herzegovina)	2665	0	1	1	0	½		1	0	½	½	0	1	1	½	7	2684	4–7
7	Sergei Tiviakov (Russia)	2625	½	0	½	1	½	0		1	½	½	½	½	½	1	7	2687	4–7
8	Jeroen Piket (Netherlands)	2570	0	0	0	½	1	1	0		1	½	½	½	1	½	6½	2663	8–9
9	Alexei Shirov (Spain)	2690	0	½	½	1	0	½	½	0		½	1	1	0	1	6½	2653	8–9
10	Peter Leko (Hungary)	2625	½	0	½	½	½	½	½	½	½		½	½	½	½	6	2629	10
11	Boris Gelfand (Belarus)	2700	½	0	½	½	0	1	½	½	0	½		½	½	½	5½	2596	11
12	Robert Hübner (Germany)	2635	½	½	0	0	½	0	½	½	0	½	½		½	1	5	2571	12–13
13	Loek van Wely (Netherlands)	2570	½	½	0	0	0	0	½	0	1	½	½	½		1	5	2576	12–13
14	Jan Timman (Netherlands)	2620	0	½	½	½	½	½	0	½	0	½	½	0	0		4	2518	14

58th Hoogovens tournament, group B, 16–28 January 1996, Wijk aan Zee, Netherlands, Category X (2495)
	Player	Rating	1	2	3	4	5	6	7	8	9	10	11	12	Total	TPR	Place
1	GM Alexander Onischuk (Ukraine)	2580		1	1	½	½	½	1	½	½	½	1	1	8	2662	1
2	GM Victor Bologan (Moldova)	2590	0		0	0	1	½	½	1	1	1	1	1	7	2588	2
3	GM António Antunes (Portugal)	2545	0	1		1	½	1	0	½	0	1	½	½	6	2526	3–5
4	GM Friso Nijboer (Netherlands)	2475	½	1	0		½	0	½	0	1	1	1	½	6	2532	3–5
5	GM John van der Wiel (Netherlands)	2535	½	0	½	½		1	½	½	½	½	½	1	6	2527	3–5
6	Jop Delemarre (Netherlands)	2325	½	½	0	1	0		1	½	0	1	½	½	5½	2510	6–7
7	GM Helgi Grétarsson (Iceland)	2450	0	½	1	½	½	0		½	0	1	½	1	5½	2499	6–7
8	GM Gildardo García (Colombia)	2525	½	0	½	1	½	½	½		½	0	1	0	5	2456	8–9
9	IM Alexander Stripunsky (Ukraine)	2495	½	0	1	0	½	1	1	½		0	0	½	5	2459	8–9
10	IM Marinus Kuijf (Netherlands)	2470	½	0	0	0	½	0	0	1	1		½	1	4½	2432	10
11	GM Anthony Miles (England)	2635	0	0	½	0	½	½	½	0	1	½		½	4	2380	11
12	FM Jan van de Mortel (Netherlands)	2315	0	0	½	½	0	½	0	1	½	0	½		3½	2378	12
