= Milan Draško =

Montenegrin chess grandmaster (born 1962)

- Milan Draško in Warsaw, 2013

Personal information
- Born: December 6, 1962 (age 63) Čapljina, SR Bosnia and Herzegovina, SFR Yugoslavia

Chess career
- Country: Yugoslavia (until 2006); Montenegro (since 2006)
- Title: Grandmaster (1993)
- Peak rating: 2557 (October 2007)

Milan Draško (born 6 December 1962) is a Montenegrin chess Grandmaster.

== Career ==
Draško achieved his first major international results in the mid-1980s. In 1984, he tied for second place at the Tatran Cup in Starý Smokovec behind Alexander Chernin. In 1985, he shared third place in Tallinn alongside Viktor Gavrikov, Alexander Kochyev, and former world champion Mikhail Tal, behind Sergey Dolmatov and Gennadi Kuzmin.

In 1988, he finished third at the Akiba Rubinstein Memorial in Polanica-Zdrój, behind Chernin and Alexander Goldin. In 1991, he tied for second place in Budapest behind Valery Loginov.

In 1993, Draško won an open tournament in Struga and tied for first place in Podgorica with Felix Levin. That same year, FIDE awarded him the Grandmaster title. In 1996, he won the bronze medal at the FR Yugoslavia Chess Championship in Podgorica.

Throughout the 2000s, Draško achieved several top tournament finishes, including co-winning the 2004 Arco Open alongside Thomas Luther and Jacob Aagaard, co-winning in Bar in 2006 with Bojan Vučković, and tying for first at the Sarajevo Open in 2007 alongside Suat Atalık.

=== Team chess ===
Draško represented FR Yugoslavia (1994) and Montenegro (2008, 2010, 2012) at four Chess Olympiads. He also competed for Montenegro in four European Team Chess Championships (2007, 2009, 2011, and 2013).

Earlier in his career, he represented Yugoslavia in the Balkaniad, winning team gold in 1985 and silver in 1986 and 1994, as well as team silver at the 1984 Mitropa Cup.

=== Tournament results ===
- 1984: Tied for 2nd place at the Tatran Cup in Starý Smokovec.
- 1988: 3rd place at the Akiba Rubinstein Memorial in Polanica-Zdrój.
- 1993: 1st place at the Struga Open and tied for 1st place in Podgorica with Felix Levin.
- 2004: Co-winner of the Bošnjaci Open and tied for 1st place at the Arco Open.
- 2006: Tied for 1st place in Bar with Bojan Vučković.
- 2007: Tied for 1st place at the Sarajevo Open.

He reached his peak FIDE rating of 2557 in October 2007, when he was ranked No. 1 in Montenegro.
