= Florian Handke =

German chess grandmaster (born 1982)

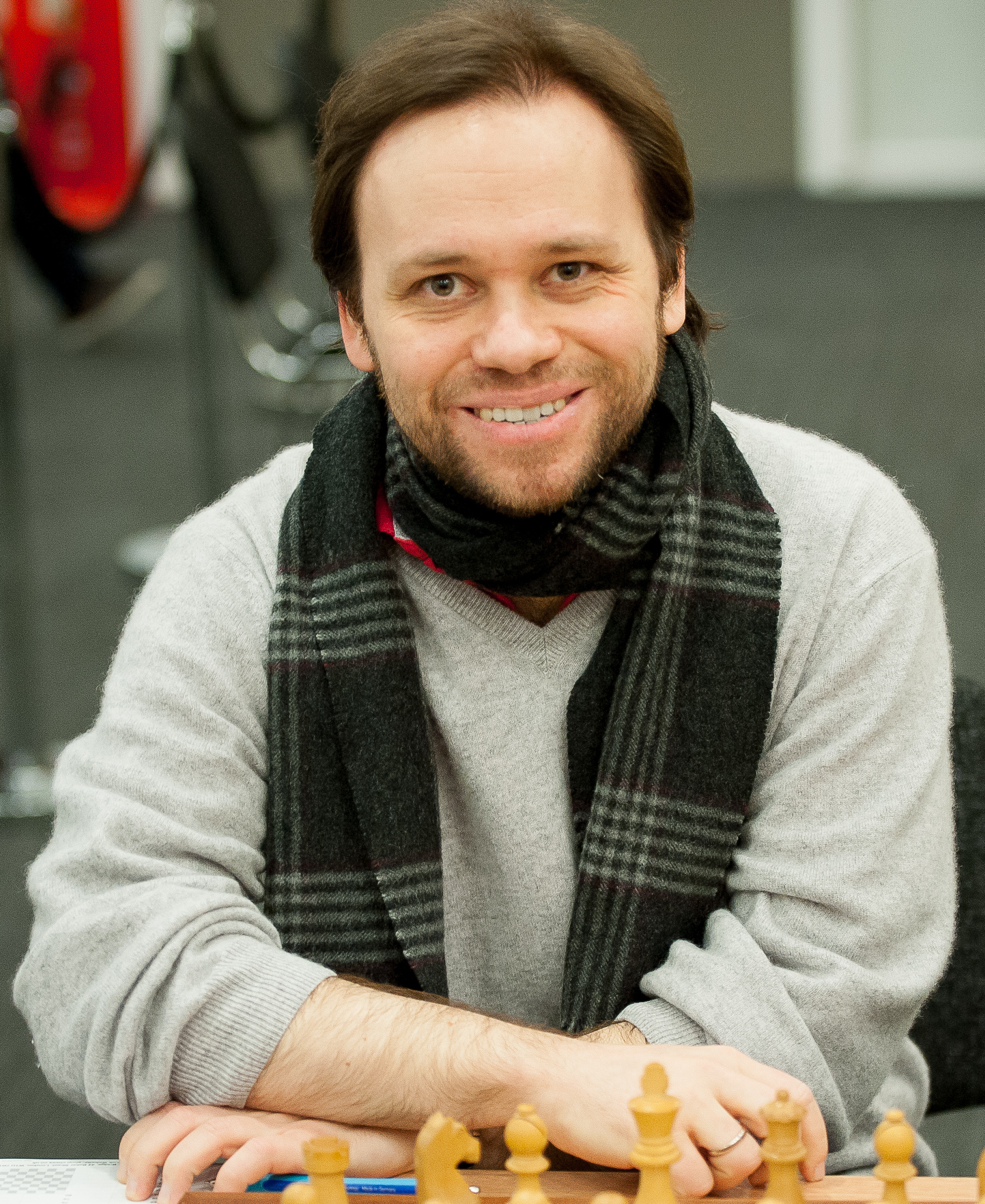
- Handke in 2016

Personal information
- Born: March 22, 1982 (age 44) Cologne, Germany

Chess career
- Country: Germany
- Title: Grandmaster (2003)
- FIDE rating: 2517 (July 2026)
- Peak rating: 2556 (July 2012)

Dr. Florian Handke is a German chess grandmaster.

== Chess career ==
In November 1999, he finished in 8th place at the World Youth Chess Championship.

In December 2001, he finished in second place at the German Individual Championship, half a point behind grandmaster Christopher Lutz. This was also his first GM norm.

In December 2002, he finished in third place at the German Individual Championship, behind grandmasters Thomas Luther and Alexander Graf. This marked his final GM norm.

He earned the Grandmaster title in 2003, achieving his norms at the:

- 73rd Deutsche Einzelmeisterschaft in December 2001
- International Hamburg Championship in May 2002
- Lost Boys Chess Tournament in August 2002
- 74th Deutsche Einzelmeisterschaft in December 2002

In the 2018/2019 season of Chess Bundesliga, he played for Team Aachen on board 9.
