= Jop Delemarre =

Dutch chess player (born 1977)

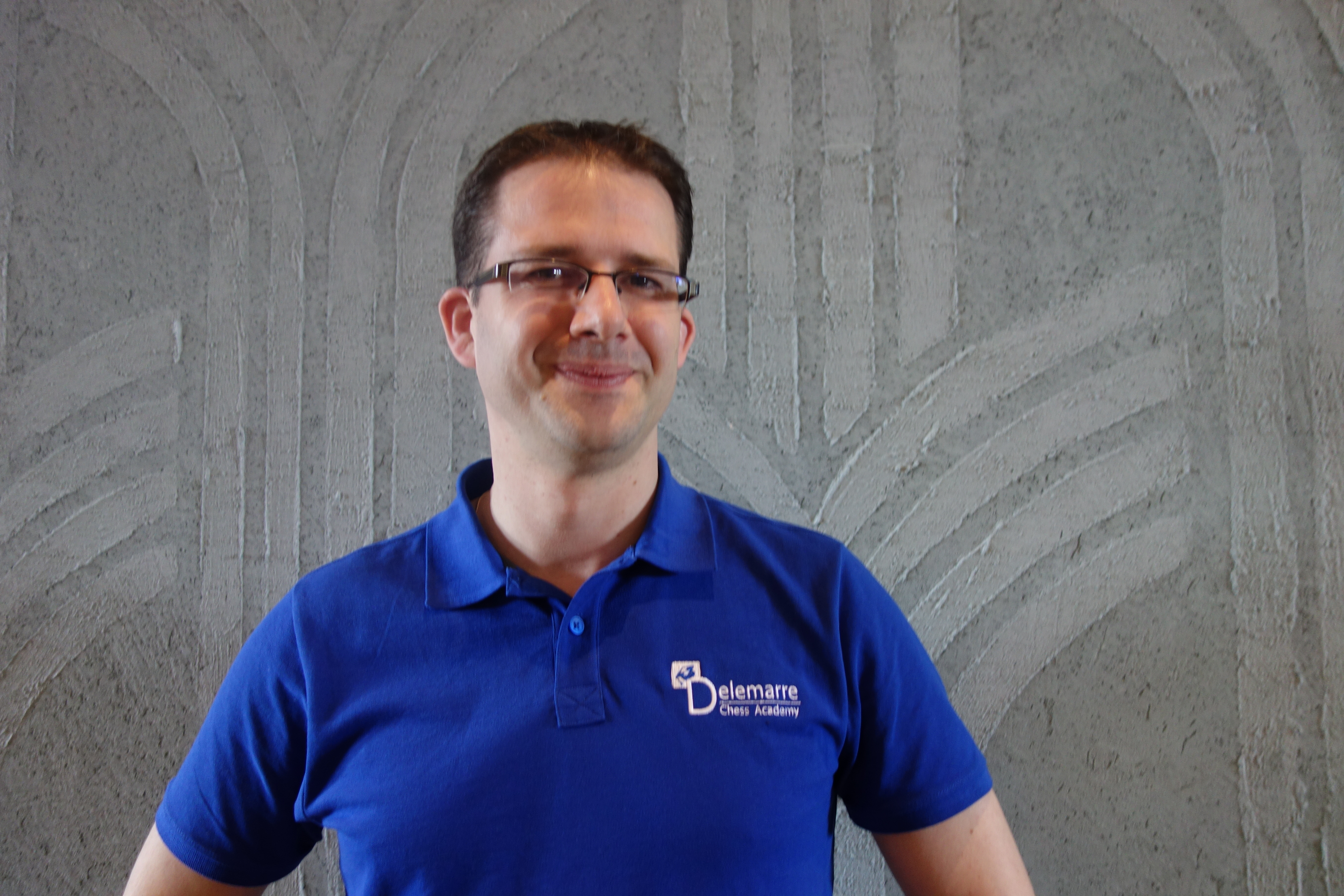
- Delemarre in 2017

Personal information
- Born: June 30, 1977 (age 49) Oegstgeest, Netherlands

Chess career
- Country: Netherlands
- Title: International Master (1996)
- Peak rating: 2478 (October 2007)

Jop Delemarre is a Dutch chess player. He is a past winner of the Dutch Junior Chess Championship.

== Chess career ==
In January 1995, he played in the Hoogovens Wijk aan Zee Chess Tournament 1995, which was run under a knockout match format. He was defeated by Jan Timman in the first round.

In January 1996, he played in Group B of the Hoogovens Wijk aan Zee Chess Tournament 1996, where he scored wins against Friso Nijboer, Helgi Grétarsson, and Marinus Kuijf, all of whom were rated over 100 points higher.

He is a chess trainer, with over 20 years of experience as of May 2023.

He is the lead trainer at ChessPlus's Online Chess Camp.

In April 2020, he held a webinar with Jesper Hall where he discussed how to effectively teach and learn chess in an online environment.

In January 2024, he held a webinar focused on chess and personal development as a trainer.
