= Hoogovens Wijk aan Zee Chess Tournament 1995 =

Chess tournament

- Venue: Wijk aan Zee

The Hoogovens Wijk aan Zee Steel Chess Tournament 1995 was the 57th edition of the Hoogovens Wijk aan Zee Chess Tournament. It was held in Wijk aan Zee in January 1995 and was won by Alexey Dreev.

The 1994 tournament again used a knockout match format, as in 1993, but has since reverted to its traditional round-robin format for all subsequent events. Alexey Dreev defeated Evgeny Bareev 2½ to 1½ in the final.

Round of 32
1	Evgeny Bareev (RUS)	3
John van der Wiel (NED)	1
Peter Leko (HUN)	1½
15	Vadim Zvjaginsev (RUS)	½
10	Jan Timman (NED)	3
Jop Delemarre (NED)	1
Michail Brodsky (UKR)	1½
8	Jeroen Piket (NED)	2½
5	Alexander Khalifman (RUS)	2
Mark van der Werf (NED)	0
Luc Winants (BEL)	0
11	Zoltán Almási (HUN)	2
14	Christopher Lutz (GER)	1½
Krunoslav Hulak (CRO)	½
Vladislav Tkachiev (KAZ)	3
3	Michael Adams (ENG)	4
4	Alexey Dreev (RUS)	2
Roberto Cifuentes (NED)	0
Alonso Zapata (COL)	3
13	Paul van der Sterren (NED)	2
12	Yasser Seirawan (USA)	1½
Loek van Wely (NED)	½
Lars Bo Hansen (DEN)	½
6	Predrag Nikolić (BIH)	1½
7	Ivan Sokolov (BIH)	2
Friso Nijboer (NED)	0
Gabriel Schwartzman (ROM)	½
9	Sergei Tiviakov (RUS)	1½
16	Alexander Onischuk (UKR)	2
Alfonso Romero Holmes (ESP)	0
Pavel Tregubov (RUS)	½
2	Nigel Short (ENG)	1½

Round of 16
1	Evgeny Bareev (RUS)	1½
Peter Leko (HUN)	½
10	Jan Timman (NED)	3
8	Jeroen Piket (NED)	2
5	Alexander Khalifman (RUS)	2½
11	Zoltán Almási (HUN)	1½
14	Christopher Lutz (GER)	2½
3	Michael Adams (ENG)	1½
4	Alexey Dreev (RUS)	2
Alonso Zapata (COL)	0
12	Yasser Seirawan (USA)	4½
6	Predrag Nikolić (BIH)	3½
7	Ivan Sokolov (BIH)	½
9	Sergei Tiviakov (RUS)	1½
16	Alexander Onischuk (UKR)	½
2	Nigel Short (ENG)	1½

Quarterfinals
1	Evgeny Bareev (RUS)	3
10	Jan Timman (NED)	2
5	Alexander Khalifman (RUS)	2½
14	Christopher Lutz (GER)	1½
4	Alexey Dreev (RUS)	3
12	Yasser Seirawan (USA)	1
9	Sergei Tiviakov (RUS)	½
2	Nigel Short (ENG)	1½

Semifinals
1	Evgeny Bareev (RUS)	1½
5	Alexander Khalifman (RUS)	½
4	Alexey Dreev (RUS)	1½
2	Nigel Short (ENG)	½

Finals
1	Evgeny Bareev (RUS)	1½
4	Alexey Dreev (RUS)	2½
