= Anke Lutz =

German chess player (born 1970)

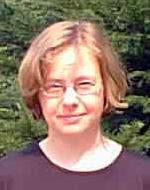
- Anke Lutz in 2001

Personal information
- Born: 21 March 1970 (age 56) Weimar, East Germany
- Spouse: Christopher Lutz (m. 2006)

Chess career
- Country: Germany
- Title: Woman International Master (1995)
- Peak rating: 2302 (July 2000)

Anke Lutz (born 21 March 1970), née Koglin, is a German chess Woman International Master (WIM) (1995), German Chess Women's Championship winner (1991).

== Biography ==
In 1991, Anke Lutz won German Chess Women's Championship in Beverungen, in 1993 and 2001 she took second place in this tournament. In 1995, she received the title of Woman International Master (WIM). In 2000, in Bad Wörishofen chess tournament 16. International Open she fulfill the norm of Woman Grandmaster (WGM).

Anke Lutz played for Germany in the Women's Chess Olympiads:

- In 1998, at third board in the 33rd Chess Olympiad (women) in Elista (+5, =4, -2),
- In 2000, at third board in the 34th Chess Olympiad (women) in Istanbul (+3, =4, -3).

Anke Lutz played for Germany in the European Team Chess Championship:

- In 1999, at first reserve board in the 3rd European Team Chess Championship (women) in Batumi (+1, =2, -1).

Anke Lutz won the 16th German Women's Correspondence Chess Championship in 1991/94. In the final of the 1st European Women's Championship 1987/99 she finished the shared 3rd place.

== Private life ==
Anke Lutz studied computer science in Cologne, where she now lives. Since the summer of 2006 she is married to the German chess Grandmaster (GM) Christopher Lutz. The couple has two daughters.
