= Vladimir Epishin =

Russian chess grandmaster (born 1965)

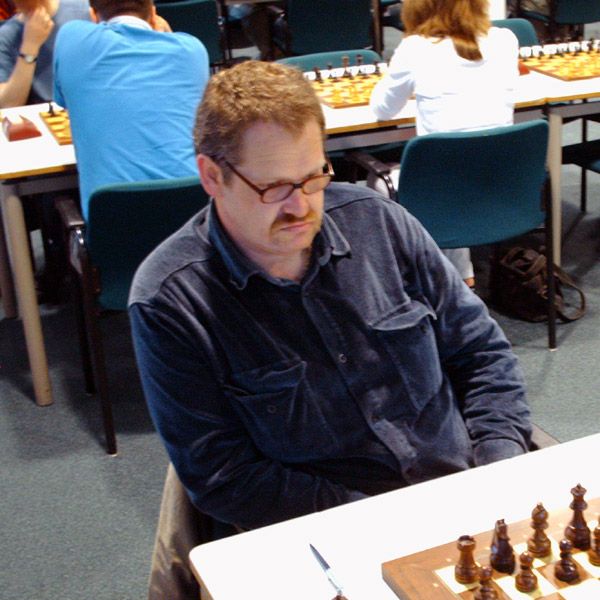
- Vladimir Epishin, 2007

Personal information
- Born: Владимир Викторович Епишин; 11 July 1965 (age 61) Leningrad, Soviet Union (then Saint Petersburg, Russia)

Chess career
- Country: Soviet Union → Russia
- Title: Grandmaster (1990)
- Peak rating: 2675 (January 1994)
- Peak ranking: No. 10 (January 1994)

Vladimir Epishin (born 11 July 1965 in Leningrad) is a Russian chess grandmaster.

== Tournament play ==
He finished third in the 58th USSR Chess Championship in 1991. He won the 1987 St. Petersburg Championship. Other tournament successes include 3rd-4th with Vladimir Akopian at the New York Open Championship in 1998, first at the Monarch Assurance PLC 11th International Chess Tournament in Isle of Man 2002, and 1st–3rd with Vladimir Burmakin and Marijan Petrov at the 21st Le Touquet Open in 2006.

Most recently, Epishin has been participating in chess tournaments in his native St.Petersburg (formerly Leningrad).

== Other chess-related ==
He was one of the seconds (assistants) to Anatoly Karpov during the late stages of Karpov's career (from 1987 to 1996). A variation of the Benko Gambit is named the Epishin Variation after him (1.d4 Nf6 2.c4 c5 3.d5 b5 4.cxb5 a6 5.bxa6 g6 6.Nc3 Bxa6 7.Nf3 d6 8.g3 Bg7 9.Bg2 Nbd7 10.Rb1).
