= Uwe Bönsch =

German chess grandmaster

Uwe Boensch
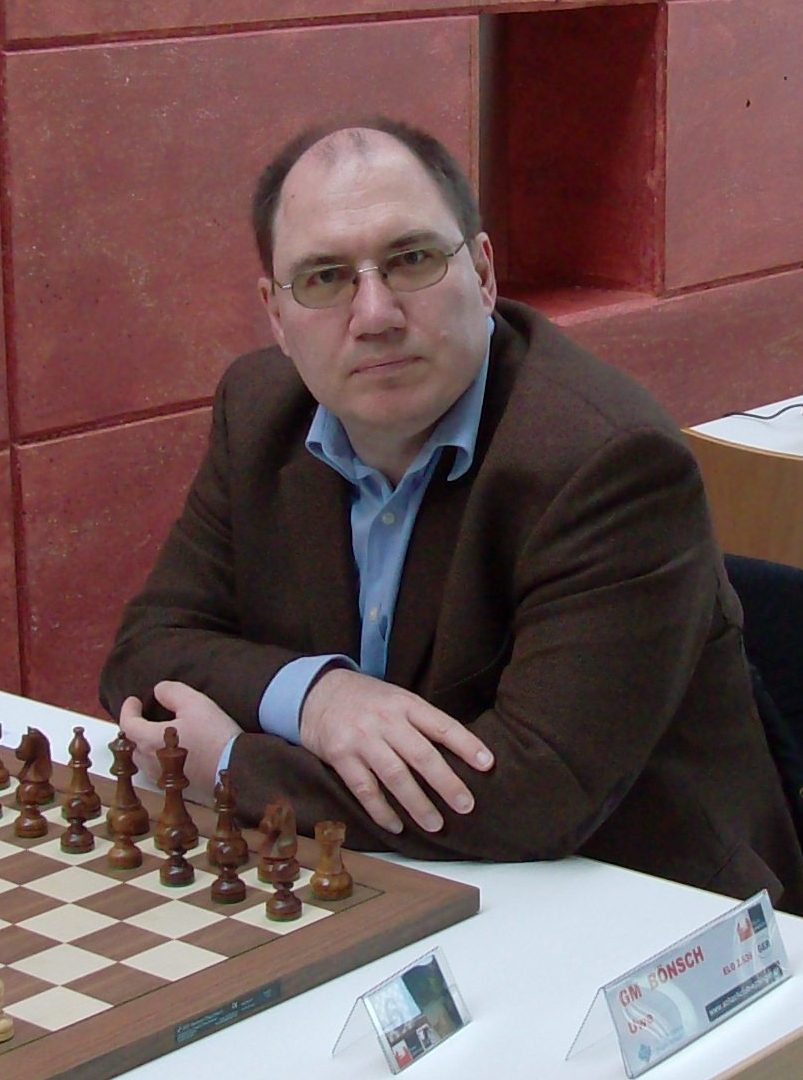
- Uwe Boench, Gernal Chess Grand Master

Personal information
- Born: October 15, 1958 (age 67) Halle, West Germany

Chess career
- Country: Germany
- Title: Grandmaster (1986)
- FIDE rating: 2431 (October 2026)
- Peak rating: 2563 (May 2018)

Uwe Boensch (born October 15, 1958) is a German chess grandmaster and FIDE Senior Trainer. He got the grandmaster title from the FIDE in the year 1986. He is an active member of FIDE Trainers' Commission (TRG).

== Notable tournaments ==
Tournament Name	Year	ELO	Points
TCh-AUT 1st Bundesliga 2013-14(Wolfsberg AUT)	2013	2524	4.0
DDR-ch 35th(Nordhausen)	1986	2475	9.5
DDR-ch 34th(Jueterbog )	1985	2445	9.0
DDR-ROM m(Zinnowitz )	1983	2425	3.0
Elekes mem-B (Budapest)	1982	2410	10.0
CSR-DDR-POL U26(Houstka)	1982	2450	3.0
Halle Buna (Halle)	1981	2425	8.0
Leipzig BKL(Leipzig)	1979	2460	6.5
Decin-B (Decin)	1976	2365	10.0
DDR-ch 25th (Groeditz)	1976	2265	10.5
CSR-DDR U26 m (Karlovy Vary)	1975	NA	1.5
