= Gerald Hertneck =

German chess grandmaster (born 1963)

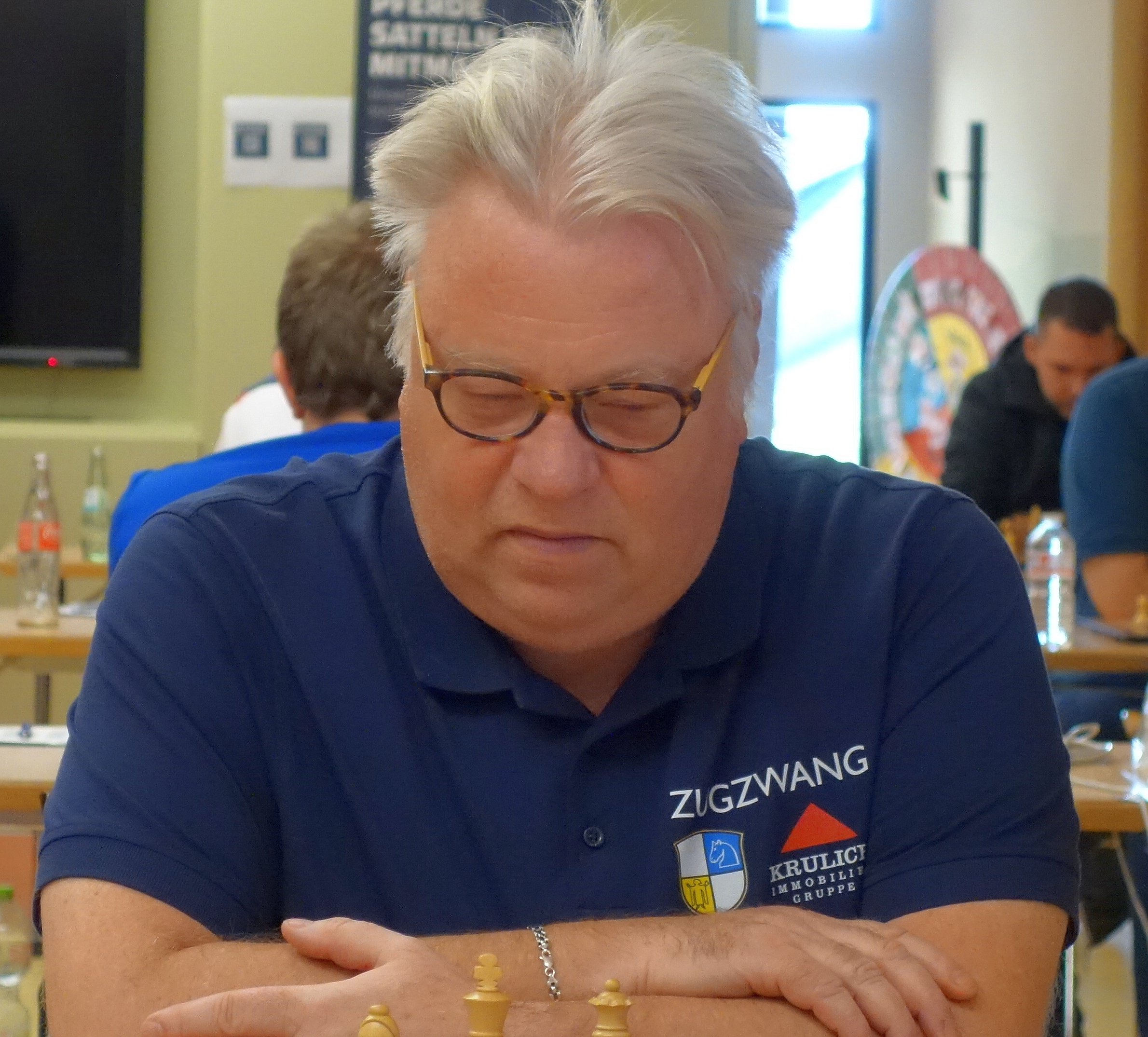
- Hertneck in 2023

Personal information
- Born: 18 September 1963 (age 62) Munich, West Germany

Chess career
- Country: Germany
- Title: Grandmaster (1991)
- FIDE rating: 2428 (July 2026)
- Peak rating: 2615 (January 1994)
- Peak ranking: No. 32 (January 1994)

Gerald Hertneck (born 18 September 1963) is a German chess grandmaster.

== Chess career ==
Born in September 1963, Hertneck won the German U16 Chess Championship in 1980. He earned his international master title in 1985 and his grandmaster title in 1991. He competed for West Germany at the 1985 World Team Chess Championship, scoring 2/5 (+0–1=4). He has also represented Germany at two Chess Olympiads (1992 and 1994), and two European Team Chess Championships (1992 and 2001). His overall Olympiad score is 12½/20 (+8–3=9}, and his overall European Team Championship score is 7½/14 (+5–4=5). His peak Elo rating of 2615, set in January 1994, made him the No. 32 ranked player in the world.

He is the No. 53 ranked German player as of April 2018. He is also a shogi player. He has achieved the mark of 1 dan.
