= Ognjen Cvitan =

Croatian chess grandmaster (born 1961)

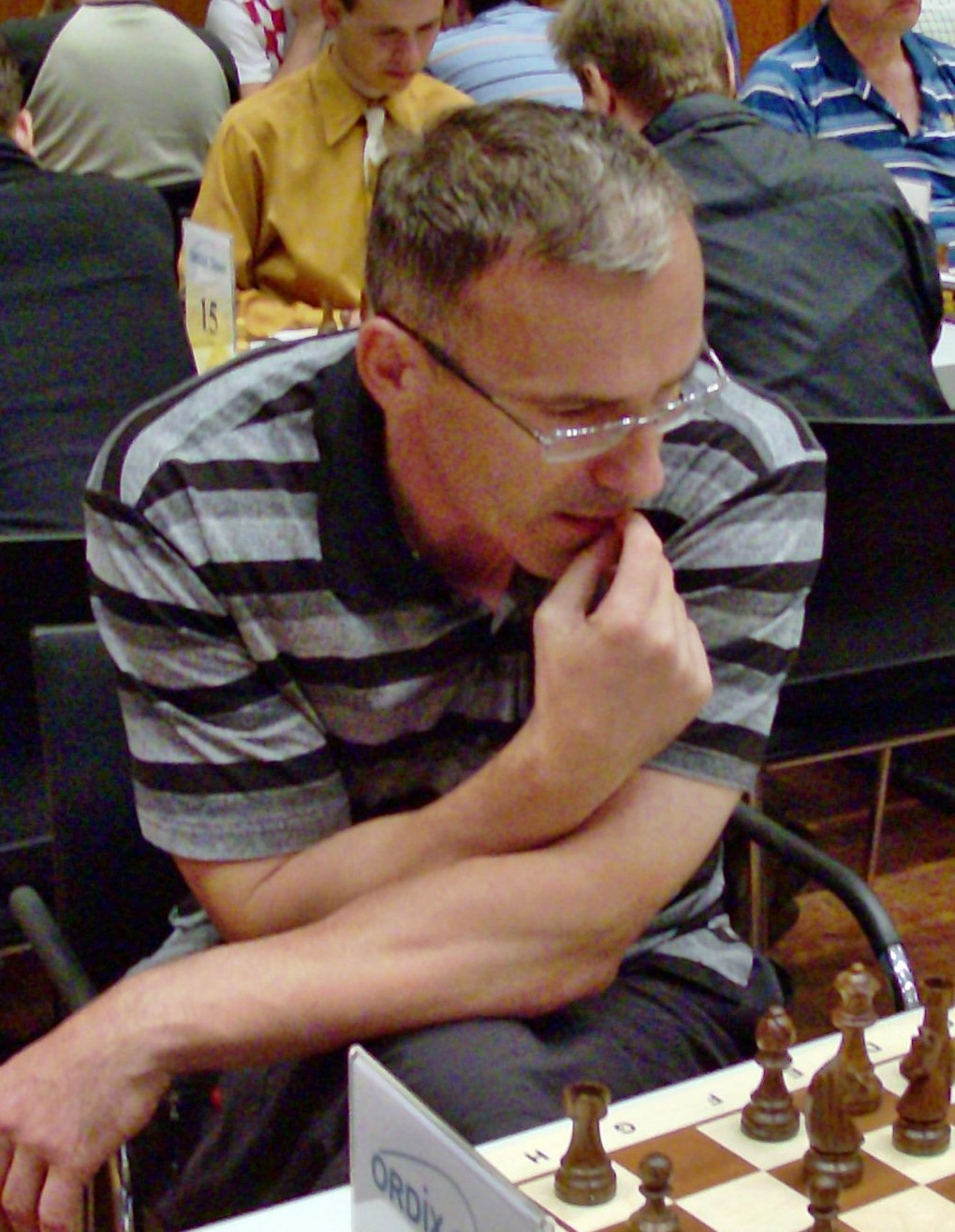
- Ognjen Cvitan, 2009

Personal information
- Born: 10 October 1961 (age 64) Šibenik, PR Croatia, FPR Yugoslavia

Chess career
- Country: Yugoslavia → Croatia
- Title: Grandmaster (1987)
- Peak rating: 2585 (July 1994)
- Peak ranking: No. 73 (July 1994)

Ognjen Cvitan (born 10 October 1961) is a Croatian chess player. He was awarded the title of Grandmaster by FIDE in 1987. He had earned the title of International Master by winning the 1981 World Junior Championship.

Cvitan was born in Šibenik (then Yugoslavia). He made his debut for Yugoslavia's C team at the 1990 Chess Olympiad, held in Novi Sad, recording a plus score on board one. At the Manila Olympiad of 1992, he played on the second reserve board for Croatia and earned an individual gold medal. Cvitan competed in the FIDE World Chess Championship 2002, where he was knocked out in the first round by Alexander Lastin.

He took first places, either outright or shared, in a number of tournaments. In the late 1980s, these included Wolfsberg 1986, Prague 1987, Pula 1987 and 1988, Mendrisio 1987, 1988 and 1989, San Bernardino 1987, Belgrade 1987, Geneva 1988, Bela Crkva 1988, Oberwart 1988, Chiasso 1989, and Vrsac 1989. The 1990s were almost as fruitful for him, his first place tally including Cannes 1990 and 1996, Dubrovnik 1990, Bad Ragaz 1992, Forli 1993, Basel 1999 and Zurich 1999. Into the new millennium, he has registered victories at Zadar 2001, Oberwart 2001, Rijeka 2001 and Bizovac 2002.

In 2011, he was awarded the title of FIDE Trainer.
