= Boris Alterman =

Ukrainian-Israeli chess grandmaster (born 1970)

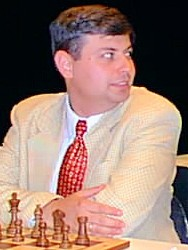
- Alterman in 1998

Personal information
- Native name: בוריס אלתרמן
- Born: May 4, 1970 (age 56) Kharkiv, Ukrainian SSR, Soviet Union

Chess career
- Country: Israel (after 1991); Soviet Union (before 1991)
- Title: Grandmaster (1992)
- FIDE rating: 2608 (November 2026)
- Peak rating: 2616 (January 1999)
- Peak ranking: No. 49 (July 1997)

Boris Alterman (Hebrew: בוריס אלתרמן, Ukrainian and Russian: Борис Альтерман; born May 4, 1970) is a Ukrainian-born Israeli chess Grandmaster, FIDE Senior Trainer (2010), advisor of the Junior chess program.

He started playing chess at the age of 7. His career highlights include earning the IM title in 1991, and the GM title in 1992. He is the winner of the following Open and GM tournaments: Haifa 1993, Bad Homburg 1996, Rishon LeZion 1996, Beijing 1995 and 1997, and Munich 1992.

He plays for Rishon LeZion chess club. He does video lectures on the Internet Chess Club Website, and has a series called "Gambit Guide" which covers openings like the Danish Gambit, Cochrane Gambit, Evans Gambit, Budapest Gambit, Fried Liver Attack, and what he proposes to call the Chigorin Gambit in the Two Knights Defense.

On the April 2009 FIDE list, he has an Elo rating of 2572.

== See also ==
- List of Jewish chess players
