= Gennadi Sosonko =

Dutch chess grandmaster (born 1943)

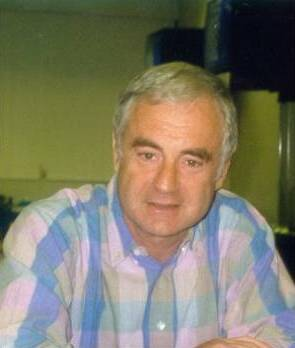

Personal information
- Born: Gennadi Borisovich Sosonko; 18 May 1943 (age 83) Troitsk, Russian SFSR, Soviet Union

Chess career
- Country: Soviet Union (before 1972); Netherlands (after 1972)
- Title: Grandmaster (1976)
- FIDE rating: 2520 (October 2026)
- Peak rating: 2595 (January 1981)
- Peak ranking: No. 16 (January 1981)

Gennadi "Genna" Borisovich Sosonko (Russian: Геннадий Борисович Сосонко, Gennady Borisovich Sosonko; born 18 May 1943) is a Russian-born Dutch chess grandmaster and writer. He has been awarded the title Grandmaster (GM) by FIDE and has twice been Dutch champion.

== Career ==
Born in Troitsk, Russia, Sosonko won the Leningrad juniors' championship in 1958.

He legally emigrated from the Soviet Union to the Netherlands via Israel in 1972. This move was instrumental in enabling him to focus on playing chess professionally and improving his chess results dramatically. He quickly earned IM and then the GM title.

Sosonko won the Dutch Championship in 1973 and 1978 (jointly). His tournament record includes 1st at Wijk aan Zee 1977, 1st at Nijmegen 1978, 3rd at Amsterdam 1980, 1st at Wijk aan Zee 1981, 3rd at Tilburg 1982 and 4th at Haninge 1988. He also drew a match with Jan Timman (+1 =0 −1) in 1984.

Sosonko played for the Dutch team at the Chess Olympiad eleven times, in 1974–84, and 1988–96. He won two individual medals: gold at Haifa 1976, bronze at Nice 1974, and two team medals: silver at Haifa 1976, and bronze at Thessaloniki 1988.

FIDE, the World Chess Federation, awarded Sosonko the International Master (IM) title in 1974, the GM title in 1976 and the FIDE Senior Trainer title in 2004.

== Books ==
Sosonko has authored six non-technical chess books centering heavily on his chess life in the Soviet Union and his relationships with and memories of both leading Soviet players and lesser-known characters in chess history.

- Sosonko, Genna (2001). Russian Silhouettes. New in Chess. ISBN 90-5691-078-7.
- Sosonko, Genna (2003). The Reliable Past. New in Chess. ISBN 90-5691-114-7.
- Sosonko, Genna (2006). Smart Chip from St. Petersburg: And Other Tales of a Bygone Chess Era. New in Chess. ISBN 90-5691-169-4.
- Sosonko, Genna (2013). The World Champions I Knew. New in Chess. ISBN 978-90-5691-418-9.
- Sosonko, Genna (2017). The Rise and Fall of David Bronstein. Elk and Ruby Publishing House. ISBN 978-59-5004-331-4.
- Sosonko, Genna (2018). Evil-Doer: Half a Century with Viktor Korchnoi. Elk and Ruby Publishing House. ISBN 978-59-5004-338-3.
- Sosonko, Genna (2021). Genna Remembers. Thinkers Publishing. ISBN 9789464201178.
- Sosonko, Gennadi (2023). The Essential Sosonko: Collected Portraits and Tales of a Bygone Chess Era. New In Chess. ISBN 9789083311289.
