= Markus Stangl =

German chess player and lawyer (1969–2020)

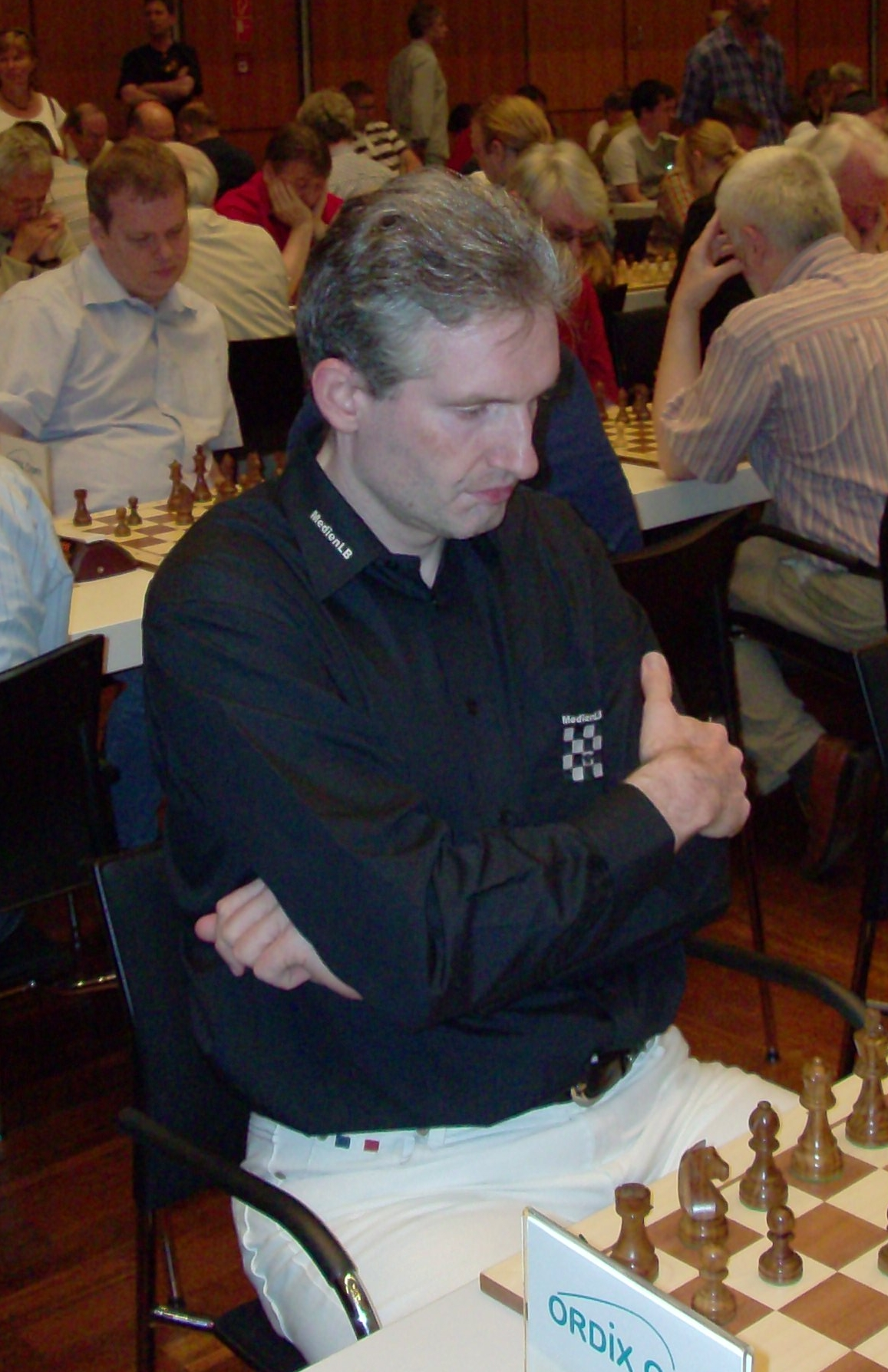
- Markus Stangl

Personal information
- Born: 24 April 1969
- Died: November 1, 2020 (aged 51)

Chess career
- Country: Germany
- Title: Grandmaster
- Peak rating: 2565 (January 1996)

Markus Stangl (24 April 1969 – 1 November 2020) was a German chess grandmaster and lawyer. He also wrote for the magazines Schach-Magazin 64 and Schach.

== Career ==
In 1988 he received the title of International Master and in 1993 the title of Grandmaster. He reached his peak rating of 2565 in 1996.

In 1987 in Maßbach and 1989 in Würzburg, Stangl won notable Bavarian blitz titles. In 1989 in Tunja, Colombia, at the World Cup for under-20s, he finished eighth behind Alexei Shirov. In 1991 and 1992, he won the German individual blitz championship. In 1992 he shared first place in the Nettetal (with Paul van der Sterren), in 1993 shared first in group B in Brno (with Michael Bezold). For the German national team, he played in 1999 in Baden, Switzerland, at the Mitropa Cup on the second board.

In the German federal chess league he played for the first time in 1986 for Bayern Munich, the chess team, with whom he became German team champion in 1989, 1990, 1991, 1992, 1993 and 1995, and in 1987, 1988, 1989, 1991, 1992, 1993, 1994, 1995, 2011 German Blitzmannschaftsmeister, from 1995 to 1999 with SG Porz, with which he won the German team championship in 1996, 1998 and 1999 and in 1997 the German Blitzmannschafts championship. In the 1999/2000 season Stangl played at SK Passau, then until 2009 at TV Tegernsee, with whom he became German lightning team champion in 2004 and 2009. From 2009 to 2017 Stangl played again for FC Bayern Munich, with whom he played in the 1st Bundesliga in the 2009/10, 2014/15 and 2015/16 seasons. In Austria he played for SK Jenbach, the Austrian team champion in 2010, 2011, 2013 and 2020, in the Italian team championship for Vimar Scacchi Marostica. Stangl took part in the European Club Cup three times, in 1993 and 1994 with Bayern Munich and in 2006 with SK Jenbach. He campaigned for a restriction on foreigners in German club chess.

After early successes, Stangl postponed his chess career in favor of his professional career. For a time he was married to the chess player Anita Stangl, with whom he also worked in business.

== Death ==
Stangl died at the age of 51 after collapsing at home.
