= Alexander Chernin =

Hungarian chess grandmaster (born 1960)

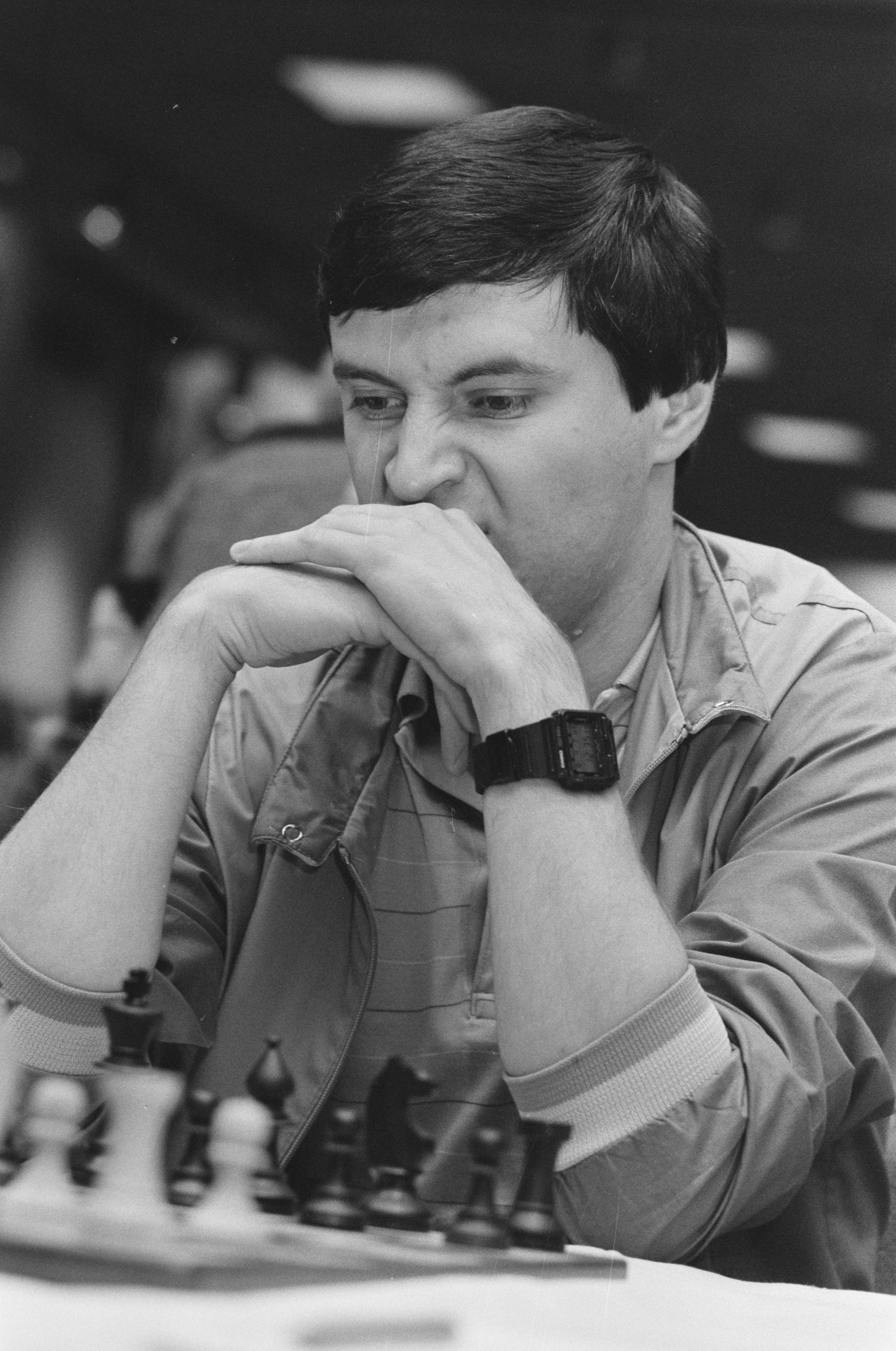
- Alexander Chernin in 1987

Personal information
- Born: Alexander Mikhailovich Chernin; 6 March 1960 (age 66) Kharkiv, Ukrainian SSR, Soviet Union

Chess career
- Country: Soviet Union (until 1991); Hungary (since 1992)
- Title: Grandmaster (1985)
- FIDE rating: 2614 (July 2026)
- Peak rating: 2645 (January 1998)
- Peak ranking: No. 19 (January 1994)

Alexander Mikhailovich Chernin (Russian: Александр Михайлович Чернин; born 6 March 1960) is a Soviet-born Hungarian chess grandmaster and trainer.

== Tournaments and championships ==
Born in Kharkiv, Ukrainian SSR, as a youth he frequently succeeded in tournaments and climbed rapidly through the junior rankings to participate at the very highest level. At Skien in 1979, he entered the World Junior Championship and finished runner-up to Yasser Seirawan. A short while later (January 1980), he played in the European Junior Championship at Groningen and won the event (ahead of Zurab Azmaiparashvili).

These prestigious successes soon led him to an International Master title and more importantly, laid the foundation stones for his continued development over the next few years. There were many tournament victories, either outright or shared, including Irkutsk 1980, Copenhagen 1984 (and 1986 with Vasily Smyslov), Stary Smokovec 1984, Polanica-Zdrój (Rubinstein Memorial) 1988 (with Alexander Goldin), Prague 1989 and Marseille 1990 (with Evgeny Bareev). Also of note were the shared second places achieved at Cienfuegos (Capablanca Memorial) 1981 and Reggio Emilia 1986/7.

The pinnacle of his playing career undoubtedly occurred in 1985, when he became a Grandmaster, won the Soviet Championship (jointly with Viktor Gavrikov and Mikhail Gurevich) and scored well in the Gammarth (Tunisia) Interzonal for a place in the Montpellier Candidates Tournament. Unfortunately, his World Championship Candidacy went no further, as he could only manage a mid-table finish. He was however a double gold medal winner in the same year, taking team and individual honours at the inaugural World Team Championship, held in Luzern, where he represented the USSR.

At another first time event, the World Blitz Championship held in Saint John 1988, he finished joint third (with Kiril Georgiev, after Mikhail Tal and Rafael Vaganian).

Into the 1990s, Chernin was still performing well in international competition; clear first at Dortmund 1990 (ahead of Boris Gelfand), and shared first/second at Dortmund 1991 (Igor Stohl won on tie-break) with further successes to follow at Buenos Aires (Najdorf Memorial) 1992, Gothenburg 1996 and Aubervilliers 1996 (the latter, a rapid event).

Chernin relocated to Budapest in 1992 and became a Hungarian national a year later. He has represented his adopted country many times; for instance at the Olympiads of 1994 and 1996, but also at three European Team Chess Championships, the latest being in 1999, when he won a team silver medal.

== Present activities ==
Into the new millennium, he has played less often, but was joint winner of the 2001 Corsica Masters, losing out to Viswanathan Anand in the final play-off game for the champion's title. He is also involved in coaching, his best known student being the young Italian-American master Fabiano Caruana. In 2004 he was awarded the title of FIDE Senior Trainer.

Alexander Chernin is a theorist and has written analytical articles for New In Chess amongst other publications. In the chess openings arena, he is a noted expert on the Pirc Defence and in 2001, co-authored a repertoire book with Lev Alburt, named Pirc Alert!.

== Notable games ==
- Alexander Chernin vs John Van der Wiel EUCup Grp3 1997, Zukertort Opening (A04), 1–0
- Alexander Chernin vs Alexander Utnasunov FIDE World Ch 2000, Semi-Slav Defense (D45), 1–0
- Peter K Wells vs Alexander Chernin Tch-AUT −01 2000, Benko Gambit: Accepted. (A57), 0–1
