= António Antunes =

Portuguese chess grandmaster (born 1962)

Personal information
- Born: February 6, 1962 (age 64) Lisbon, Portugal

Chess career
- Country: Portugal
- Title: Grandmaster (1994)
- FIDE rating: 2496 (July 2026)
- Peak rating: 2545 (January 1996)

António Carlos Marques Antunes (6 February 1962, Lisbon) is a Portuguese chess player. He earned the grandmaster (GM) title in 1994 and International Master (IM) title in 1985. He is the first GM of Portugal. He retired from competitive chess in 2000.

Amongst players he ranks, as of 2022, 969th best of all time and second-best Portuguese chess player ever.

== Notable tournaments ==
Tournament Name	Year	ELO	Points
POR-chT(Portugal)	1997	2510	8.0
Benasque op(Benasque)	1996	2540	6.0
Benasque op(Benasque)	1995	2530	4.5
Capablanca mem-B(Matanzas)	1994	2465	9.5
Portuguese Masters(Portugal)	1994	2465	7.0
Lisbon BNU op(Lisbon)	1992	2465	6.0
Valencia(Valencia)	1989	2445	6.0
Benidorm op(Benidorm)	1988	2390	1.5
Reggio Emilia 8687-B(Reggio Emilia)	1986	2410	2.0
