= Thomas Luther =

German chess grandmaster (born 1969)

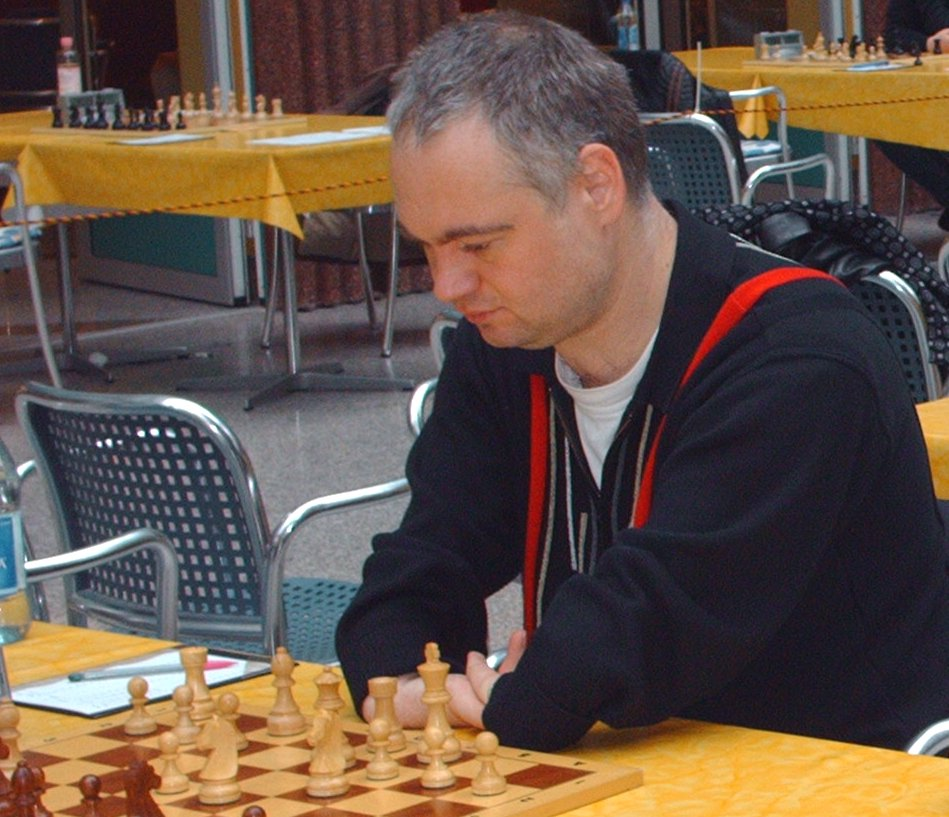
- Thomas Luther playing in the Bundesliga.

Personal information
- Born: November 4, 1969 (age 56) Erfurt, East Germany

Chess career
- Country: East Germany (1978-1990); Germany (1990-)
- Title: Grandmaster (1994)
- FIDE rating: 2518 (July 2026)
- Peak rating: 2604 (July 2001)
- Peak ranking: No. 82 (July 2001)

Thomas Luther (born November 4, 1969, in Erfurt) is a German chess player and International Grandmaster of chess. He was a member of the German team that won the silver medal in the 34th Chess Olympiad in Istanbul in 2000.

== Childhood and Youth ==
He started to play chess at the age of four. Even in his childhood days he started to avidly read classic chess literature and learned a lot by himself.

In 1978 he became a member of the club HSG Medizin Erfurt.

In 1980, 1981 and 1984 he won the respective East Germany championships for his age class.

In 1986 he won the 12. GDR youth-championship in correspondence chess.

Beginning with 1985 he played for Mikroelektronik Erfurt in the Oberliga, the highest league in the GDR.

== Chess career ==
In 1988 he was awarded the title International Master by FIDE. After a series of further successes, among them second places at the GDR championship in Zittau 1989 and in Altensteig 1991 and victories in Andorra 1992, Lenk and Hamburg 1993 and finally his first (all-)German championship 1993 (after a 2–0 victory in the final against Thomas Pähtz), he became Grandmaster in 1994.

=== World- and National Championship Results ===
Thomas Luther qualified for the world championships in Groningen in 1997. In this KO-tournament he won the first round 3.5–2.5 against Lajos Portisch but lost (0.5–1.5) against Vladimir Akopian in round 2.

He qualified again in 2000 and won the first round in Moscow 3–1 against Sergey Volkov but lost against Ilya Smirin (0.5–1.5).

In 2002 he won the German championship in Saarbrücken again, outdistancing Alexander Graf and Florian Handke.

He won his third German national championship in 2006 in Osterburg in a tie-breaker with Vitaly Kunin and Artur Yusupov.

=== German National Team ===
Between 1998 and 2006 Thomas Luther was often part of the German selection representing Germany in various international team tournaments: in the Olympiads 1998 in Elista (6th place), 2000 in Istanbul (2nd place), 2002 in Bled (14th place) and 2006 in Turin (15th place). He also played for Germany in the World Team Chess Championship of 2001 and the European Team Chess Championship of 2003 in Plovdiv.

=== IPCA ===
Thomas Luther, who suffers from dysmelia, played at the 39th Chess Olympiad in Khanty-Mansiysk, 2010 first board for the IPCA (International Physically Disabled Chess Association) and made 6.5 points out of 10.

=== Tournament victories ===
During his active career he won many international tournaments, i.e. Lippstadt (1994), Hastings (1994/95), Bissen (1995), Apolda (1994 and 1999), Turin (1996), Cienfuegos (1997), Bad Zwesten (1998), Nova Gorica (2000), Böblingen (2005), Oberwart (2005) and Bad Homburg (2008). In 2009 he won 6th LGA Premium Chess Cup in Nürnberg.

In October 2011 he won the first World Chess Games for Disabled with a perfect score of 7 out of 7.

=== FIDE official and DSB official ===
He is the head of the FIDE Commission on Disabled and played for the IPCA team once. He is also head of the division for competitive chess (Referent für Spitzenschach) in the German chess federation.

== Game ==
Thomas Luther's style is tactically oriented, which makes him a formidable opponent for even the strongest player. The following game is typical where he attacks former Candidate Robert Hübner right out of the opening. The game was played in the penultimate round of the German championship 2002 and laid the ground for Thomas's later winning the title. The comments are based on personal conversations with Thomas Luther himself.

Robert Hübner (2640) – Thomas Luther (2538)
(74th German Individual Championship, Saarbrücken, 2002, Round 8)

1. c2-c4 c7-c6 2. e2–e4 d7-d5 3. e4xd5 Ng8-f6

Black already offers a pawn sacrifice. Due to the gambit-style opening the position immediately becomes sharp and concrete.

4. Qd1-a4

After 4., Black's d5xc6 Sb8xc6 is leading to a good game.

4. … e7-e6

Either way, Black absolutely wants to sacrifice a pawn.

5. d5xe6 Bf8-c5 6. Ng1-f3

Position: h1 white rook, f1 white bishop, e1 white king, c1 white bishop, b1 white knight, a1 white rook, h2 white pawn, g2 white pawn, f2 white pawn, d2 white pawn, b2 white pawn, a2 white pawn, f3 white knight, c4 white pawn, a4 white queen, c5 black bishop, f6 black knight, e6 white pawn, c6 black pawn, h7 black pawn, g7 black pawn, f7 black pawn, b7 black pawn, a7 black pawn, h8 black rook, e8 black king, d8 black queen, c8 black bishop, b8 black knight, a8 black rook

White declines to take the risk of accepting the second sacrifice. After 6. e6xf7+ Ke8xf7, the rook h8 dangerously enters into play, too.

6. … Nf6-g4

Again, Black continues as aggressively as possible.

7. d2-d4 Bc5xd4 8. Nf3xd4 Qd8xd4 9. Qa4-c2 Nb8-a6

Position: h1 white rook, f1 white bishop, e1 white king, c1 white bishop, b1 white knight, a1 white rook, h2 white pawn, g2 white pawn, f2 white pawn, c2 white queen, b2 white pawn, a2 white pawn, g4 black knight, d4 black queen, c4 white pawn, e6 white pawn, c6 black pawn, a6 black knight, h7 black pawn, g7 black pawn, f7 black pawn, b7 black pawn, a7 black pawn, h8 black rook, e8 black king, c8 black bishop, a8 black rook

The second knight joins the attack. Black's opening strategy was successful.

10. Nb1-a3 Bc8xe6 11. h2-h3 Na6-b4 12. Qc2-d2 Qd4-e4+ 13. Bf1-e2 Qe4xg2 14. Rh1-f1 Ng4-h2 (!)

Position: f1 white rook, e1 white king, c1 white bishop, a1 white rook, h2 black knight, g2 black queen, f2 white pawn, e2 white bishop, d2 white queen, b2 white pawn, a2 white pawn, h3 white pawn, a3 white knight, c4 white pawn, b4 black knight, e6 black bishop, c6 black pawn, h7 black pawn, g7 black pawn, f7 black pawn, b7 black pawn, a7 black pawn, h8 black rook, e8 black king, a8 black rook

Black starts a combination leading to material gain. The inconspicuous knight on h2 will single-handedly wreak havoc to White's position.

15. Qd2xb4 0-0-0 16. Na3-b5

White attacks the black king with a knight sacrifice. Black counterattacks.

16. … c6xb5 17. Bc1-f4

Position: f1 white rook, e1 white king, a1 white rook, h2 black knight, g2 black queen, f2 white pawn, e2 white bishop, b2 white pawn, a2 white pawn, h3 white pawn, f4 white bishop, c4 white pawn, b4 white queen, b5 black pawn, e6 black bishop, h7 black pawn, g7 black pawn, f7 black pawn, b7 black pawn, a7 black pawn, h8 black rook, d8 black rook, c8 black king

The threat is Qc5+, forcing Qc6 and the subsequent loss of a knight, as Black would get mated otherwise.

17. … Qg2xf1+ !!

This queen sacrifice enables the knight to be deployed effectively. Black wins material.

18. Be2xf1 Nh2-f3+ 19. Ke1-e2 Nf3-d4+ 20. Ke2-d2

White acquiesces the discovered check, but other king moves were even worse: Ke2-e1/e3 and Nd4-c2+ wins the queen.

20. … Nd4-c6+ 21. Qb4-d6 Rd8xd6+ 22. Bf4xd6 Be6xc4

Black reaps the fruit of his combinatorial fireworks: the smoke has cleared and he is two pawns ahead.

23. Kd2-c3 Rh8-d8 24. Bd6-f4 Bc4xf1 25. Ra1xf1 b5-b4+ 26. Kc3-c2 Rd8-d5 27. Bf4-e3 Kc8-d7 28. Rf1-g1 g7-g6 29. Rg1-g4 a7-a5 30. Rg4-h4 h7-h5 31. Rh4-f4 f7-f5 32. h3-h4 b7-b5 33. Rf4-f3 Nc6-d4+ 34. Be3xd4 Rd5xd4 35. Rf3-d3 Rd4xd3 36. Kc2xd3 g6-g5

This pawn breakthrough decides the game. The rest for completeness' sake:

37. h4xg5 h5-h4 38. Kd3-e2 f5-f4 39. f2-f3 Kd6-e6 40. Ke2-f2 Ke6-f5 41. Kf2-g2 Kf5xg5 42. Kg2-h3 Kg5-h5 43. Kh3-g2 Kh5-g6 44. Kg2-h2 Kg6-f6 45. Kh2-h3 Kf6-e5 46. Kh3xh4 Ke5-d4
White gave up!

== Personal ==
Luther has a congenital disability (dysmelia) on his arms. As a child, he was considered to have no perspective in sports from GDR officials. He tells of having spent a great amount of energy experiencing that he could be equal to or better than others.

Thomas Luther is author at ChessBase. He has published various DVDs on opening theory and other topics. He is considered to be one of the leading experts on the French Defence, about which he published several times.

In 2009, he finished his studies at the University of Hagen acquiring the title of Diplomkaufmann (German equivalent to Master of Business Administration).

Luther's current standard FIDE Elo rating is 2518 (July 2026).
