= Marinus Kuijf =

Dutch chess player (born 1960)

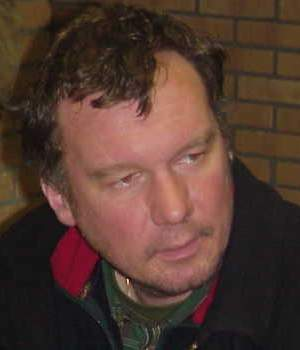

Personal information
- Born: 12 February 1960 (age 66)

Chess career
- Country: Netherlands
- Title: International Master (1983)
- Peak rating: 2530 (July 1989)

Marinus Kuijf (also Riny Kuijf; born 12 February 1960), is a Dutch chess International Master (IM) (1983), Dutch Chess Championship winner (1989), Chess Olympiad team bronze medalist (1988).

== Biography ==
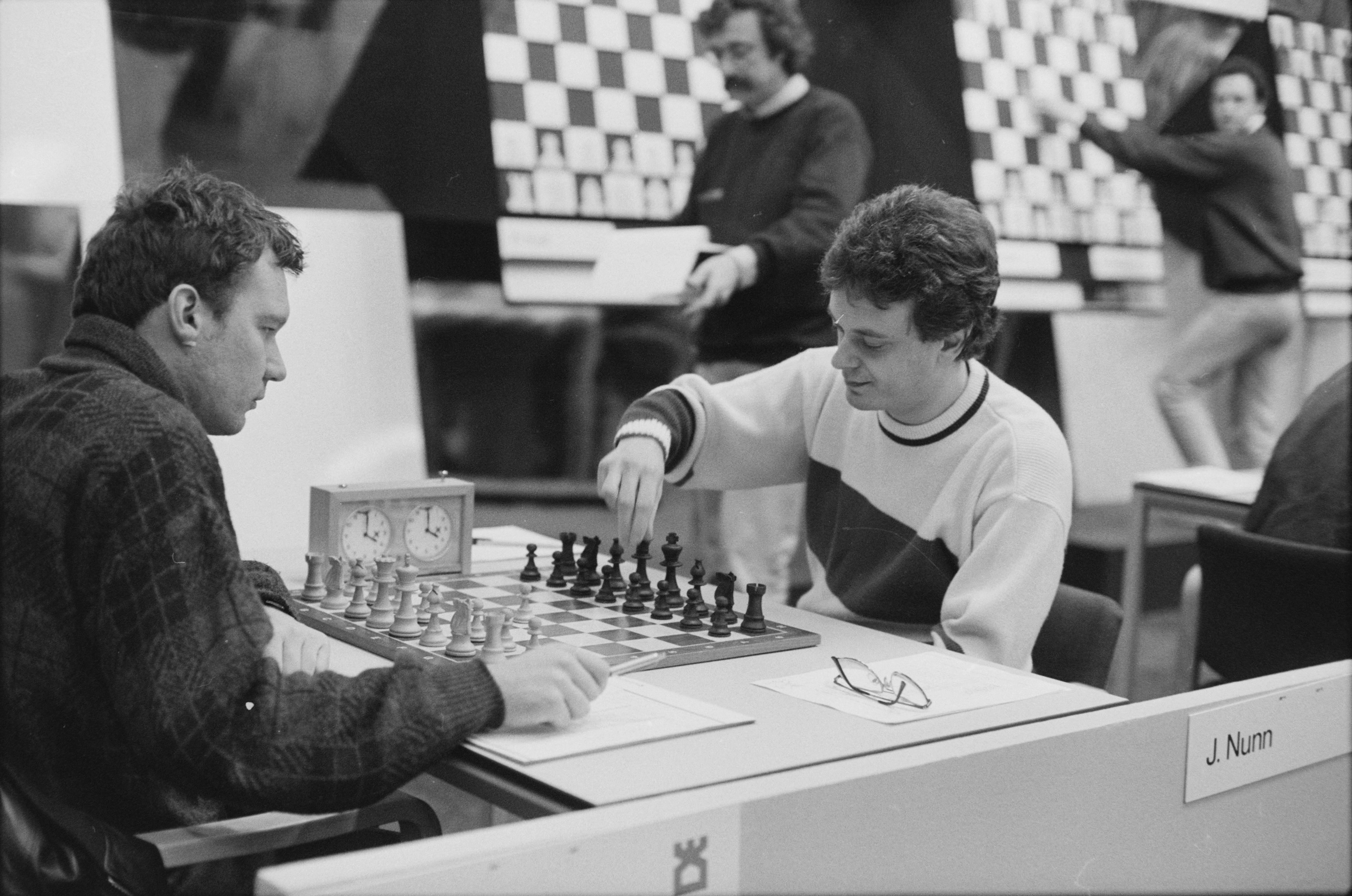
Hoogovens 1990: Kuijf playing John Nunn

In 1988, Marinus Kuijf won bronze in the Dutch Chess Championship in Hilversum, and in 1989 became the winner of that championship.

Marinus Kuijf is winner of many international chess tournaments, including winning 2nd place (1983) and twice 3rd place in Wijk aan Zee "B" tournament (1986, 1989), winning Guernsey (1988), twice 2nd place in Groningen (1988, 1990), shared 1st place in Sas van Gent (1992), shared 2nd place (1992) and shared 1st place twice in Sitges (1993, 1994).

Marinus Kuijf played for Netherlands in the Chess Olympiad:

- In 1988, at first reserve board in the 28th Chess Olympiad in Thessaloniki (+4, =1, -1) and won team bronze medal.

Marinus Kuijf played for Netherlands in the World Team Chess Championship:

- In 1989, at second reserve board in the 2nd World Team Chess Championship in Lucerne (+0, =1, -3).

Marinus Kuijf played for Netherlands in the European Team Chess Championships:

- In 1989, at first reserve board in the 9th European Team Chess Championship in Haifa (+0, =1, -1).

In 1983, he was awarded the FIDE International Master (IM) title.
