= Christopher Lutz =

German chess grandmaster (born 1971)

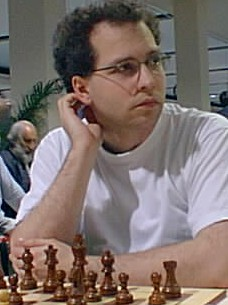
- Lutz at the 34th Chess Olympiad, 2000

Personal information
- Born: 24 February 1971 (age 55) Neukirchen-Vluyn, West Germany
- Spouse: Anke Koglin (m. 2006)

Chess career
- Country: Germany
- Title: Grandmaster (1992)
- FIDE rating: 2517 (July 2026)
- Peak rating: 2655 (July 2002)
- Peak ranking: No. 35 (July 2002)

Christopher Lutz (born 24 February 1971) is a German chess grandmaster and a two-time German Chess Champion.

== Chess career ==
Born in 1971, Lutz earned his international master title in 1989 and his grandmaster title in 1992. He won the German Chess Championship in 1995 and 2001. In 2000 he competed on board 4 for the German team that won the silver medal at the 34th Chess Olympiad in Istanbul.

Lutz worked as a consultant for the Hydra chess project. He concentrated on developing the opening book for Hydra, as well as creating test positions, until the discontinuation of the project in 2009.

== Personal life ==
Since the summer of 2006, he is married to the German chess master Anke Lutz. The couple has two daughters.

== Bibliography ==
- Endgame Secrets: How to Plan in the Endgame in Chess, by Christopher Lutz, 1999, Batsford. ISBN 978-0-7134-8165-5.
