= Total Chess World Championship 2026 =

Pilot tournament of the Total Chess World Championship Tour

Total Chess World Championship 2026 (Pilot event)
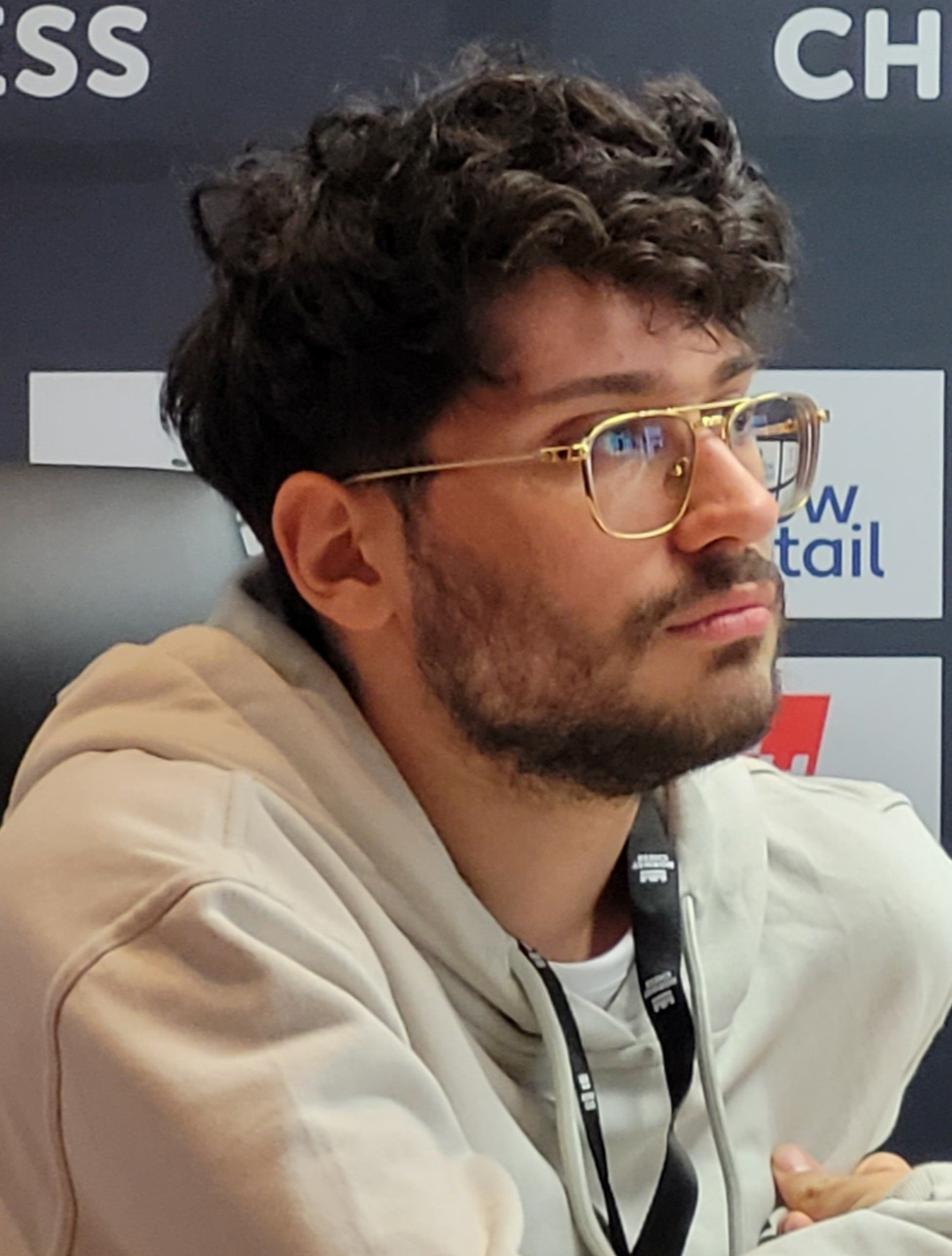
- Alireza Firouzja, winner of the Total Chess World Championship Pilot 2026
- Venue: Anantara New York Palace Budapest Hotel
- Location: Budapest, Hungary
- Dates: 10–21 November 2026
- Organizing body: FIDE; Norway Chess
- Competitors: 24 from 13 nations

Champion
- (France) Alireza Firouzja

Total Chess World Championship 2026 was the pilot tournament of the first Total Chess World Championship, which was announced by Norway Chess on October 15, 2025, approved and endorsed by FIDE and was jointly organized by both of these bodies. The tournament was a new initiative to combine talents of the three chess formats of classical, rapid and blitz into one tournament tour. The event was a part of the Total Chess World Championship Tour 2026–27, which offers two spots for the Candidates Tournament 2028.

The pilot tournament was held at the Anantara New York Palace Budapest Hotel in Budapest, Hungary. Alireza Firouzja won the tournament after defeating Anish Giri in the final. The winner, runner-up, and third-place finisher (Firouzja, Giri and Fabiano Caruana) qualified for the First Leg of the Total Chess World Championship Tour.

== Format ==
The pilot tournament consisted of two stages, group stage and knockout stage. A nine-round swiss-system blitz tournament was played the day before the opening ceremony. The standings of this tournament acted as tie-breaker for the group stage.

Fast Classical is a new time control, announced by FIDE in September 2025, which was used instead of the regular standard time controls. It was used to attract engagement from viewers by games of shorter duration than the longer ones in other events. In this time control, players got 45 minutes with an increment of 30 seconds starting from move 1.

Time controls for each format of the tournament were as follows:

- Fast Classic – 45 minutes with 30-second increment per move starting from move 1.
- Rapid – 15 minutes with 10-second increment per move starting from move 1.
- Blitz – 3 minutes with 2-second increment per move starting from move 1.

=== Group Stage ===
Four groups were made with 6 players each. The four highest-rated players were placed in four different groups and the remaining five players of each group were determined by drawing lots.

The group stage followed a double round robin format with fast classical time controls. Each of the six players in a group played 2 games per day against each other, so the group stage lasted 5 days. In total, each player played 10 games. Players earned 3 points for a victory, 1 point for a draw, and 0 points for a loss. A tie in the rankings would be broken by the ranks in the pre-tournament Blitz Swiss.

=== Knockout Stage ===
Players advanced to the knockout brackets according to the respective order of their rankings in group stage. The winner of Knockout Bracket 1 would become the winner of the tournament.

Semifinal pairings in each Knockout bracket were determined by their pre‑tournament blitz rank among those four, and paired 1 vs 4 and 2 vs 3. Point system is classified in the table below.

	Group Stage	Knockout Stage		
	Fast Classic	Fast Classic	Rapid	Blitz
Win	3	8	4	1
Draw	1	4	2	0.5
Loss	0			

==== Knockout Daily Winner Structure ====
The matches of semi-final, 3rd-place match, and final were played over two days, using the “two-day system”. Each day included Fast Classical, Rapid, and Blitz games before a winner was determined. First, four Blitz games were played, then two Rapid games, and then the Fast Classical game.

The higher-ranked player based on the pre-tournament blitz ranking had choosen the color for the first Blitz game on Day 1, colors for all remaining games on Day 1 and Day 2 then alternate.

Each day produced a day-winner, or a tie occurred.

Scores were reset each day, and in case of a tie in one of the days, the other day acted as a tiebreaker. A tie would occur at the end of day 2 if a player had won day 1 and the other player had won day 2, or each day was tied. In this case, an armageddon game was played to determine the winner. White got 10 minutes while black got 7 minutes, both with an increment of 1 second starting from move 41, and black got draw odds. The event was always determined on the final day. The player who had the most total points over two days choosed the color. If they had equal points, then an Armageddon bidding would take place.

=== Point distribution ===
For the Total Chess World Championship Tour, points are awarded according to a player's final position in their respective bracket. The lowest-ranked player in each bracket receives the same number of points as the highest-ranked player in the preceding bracket. Additionally, 5 bonus points are awarded to the winner of each subsequent leg.

Rank	Knockout Bracket					
Rank	Knockout 1	Knockout 2	Knockout 3	Knockout 4	Knockout 5	Knockout 6
1st	30	20	16	12	9	6
2nd	24	18	14	11	8	5
3rd	22	17	13	10	7	4
4th	20	16	12	9	6	3

== Qualification ==
The players qualified for this tournament by holding ex-officio titles, by winning or being ranked in eligible tournaments (as mentioned below), by being on top of classical FIDE rankings or the eligible tournaments in FIDE Circuit. The table below shows seed number accredited to the eligible players. The players who wish not to play or qualify via more than one path, leaving another vacant, were replaced via replacement rules.

The table below lists the twenty-four players who qualified for the pilot tournament.

Qualification method	Player	Age	FIDE		Total Chess	
Qualification method	Player	Age	Rating	Rank	Rating	Rank
Qualification method	Player	(November 2026)				
Reigning World Chess Champion	~~(India) Gukesh Dommaraju~~ (withdrew)	20	2710	26	2686	27
Reigning Women's World Chess Champion	~~(China) Ju Wenjun~~ (withdrew)	35	2553	290	2502	-
Three medalists of the World Rapid Championship 2025	(Norway) Magnus Carlsen (gold)	35	2823	1	2830	1
Three medalists of the World Rapid Championship 2025	(FIDE) Vladislav Artemiev (silver)	28	2653	66	2693	24
Three medalists of the World Rapid Championship 2025	(India) Arjun Erigaisi (bronze)	23	2746	12	2751	6
Finalists of the World Blitz Championship 2025	(Uzbekistan) Nodirbek Abdusattorov (runner-up)	22	2772	5	2771	3
Top nine players in the standard rating list (as on January 1, 2026)	(United States) Fabiano Caruana (#3)	34	2783	3	2740	9
Top nine players in the standard rating list (as on January 1, 2026)	(Germany) Vincent Keymer (#4)	22	2761	9	2686	28
Top nine players in the standard rating list (as on January 1, 2026)	(Netherlands) Anish Giri (#6)	32	2747	11	2687	26
Top nine players in the standard rating list (as on January 1, 2026)	(France) Alireza Firouzja (#7)	23	2757	10	2765	4
Top nine players in the standard rating list (as on January 1, 2026)	(India) R Praggnanandhaa (#8)	21	2763	7	2737	10
Top nine players in the standard rating list (as on January 1, 2026)	(Hungary) Richárd Rapport (#14, replacement for Nakamura)	30	2718	23	2676	31
Top nine players in the standard rating list (as on January 1, 2026)	(Azerbaijan) Shakhriyar Mamedyarov (#19, replacement for Erigaisi)	41	2709	27	2666	36
Top nine players in the standard rating list (as on January 1, 2026)	(United States) Levon Aronian (#20, replacement for Gukesh)	44	2719	20	2724	12
Lowest sum of places in the World Rapid Championship 2025 and the World Blitz Championship 2025 (replacements for the finalist of World Blitz Championship 2025 and the Top nine players in standard rating list, as on January 1, 2026)	(France) Maxime Vachier-Lagrave	36	2707	28	2718	13
Lowest sum of places in the World Rapid Championship 2025 and the World Blitz Championship 2025 (replacements for the finalist of World Blitz Championship 2025 and the Top nine players in standard rating list, as on January 1, 2026)	(United States) Wesley So	33	2771	6	2742	8
Winner of the Candidates Tournament 2026 (or World Champion Challenger)	~~(Uzbekistan) Javokhir Sindarov~~ (withdrew)	20	2782	4	2756	5
Winner of the Women's Candidates Tournament 2026 (or Women's World Champion Challenger)	(India) Vaishali Rameshbabu	25	2452	986	2403	-
Winner of the Women's Candidates Tournament 2026 (or Women's World Champion Challenger)	(Kazakhstan) Bibisara Assaubayeva (runner-up, replacement for Ju)	22	2532	387	2472	-
Top three players in the standard rating list not already qualified (as on June 1, 2026)	(United States) Hans Niemann	23	2697	32	2695	22
Top three players in the standard rating list not already qualified (as on June 1, 2026)	(Poland) Jan-Krzysztof Duda	28	2741	13	2712	17
Top three players in the standard rating list not already qualified (as on June 1, 2026)	(Vietnam) Lê Quang Liêm	35	2732	16	2683	29
Top three players in the 2026 FIDE Open Circuit (as on September 1, 2026)	(Armenia) Haik M. Martirosyan	26	2669	48	2662	41
Top three players in the 2026 FIDE Open Circuit (as on September 1, 2026)	(United States) Andrew Hong	21	2609	134	2572	-
Top three players in the 2026 FIDE Open Circuit (as on September 1, 2026)	(FIDE) Ian Nepomniachtchi	36	2719	22	2745	7
2026–2027 FIDE Circuit (as on September 1, 2026; replacements for the reigning World Chess Champion and the winner of Candidates Tournament 2026)	(Netherlands) Jorden van Foreest	27	2715	24	2665	38
2026–2027 FIDE Circuit (as on September 1, 2026; replacements for the reigning World Chess Champion and the winner of Candidates Tournament 2026)	(United States) Abhimanyu Mishra	17	2644	76	2595	-

=== FIDE Rating Qualification Leaderboard ===
Top nine players in the FIDE standard rating list as of January 1, 2026 and Top 3 players as of June 1, 2026 not already qualified were invited to play the pilot tournament.

- : Qualifiers – Qualified for the pilot tournament (Next top leaders if any current top players have already qualified through other paths)
- : Player already qualified for the pilot tournament via another path
- : Player qualified but declined to participate

January 2026 FIDE Rankings			June 2026 FIDE Rankings		
Rank	Player	Rating	Rank	Player	Rating
1	(Norway) Magnus Carlsen	2841	1	(Norway) Magnus Carlsen	2841
2	(United States) Hikaru Nakamura	2810	2	(United States) Fabiano Caruana	2792
3	(United States) Fabiano Caruana	2795	3	(United States) Hikaru Nakamura	2792
4	(Germany) Vincent Keymer	2776	4	(Uzbekistan) Javokhir Sindarov	2777
5	(India) Arjun Erigaisi	2775	5	(Uzbekistan) Nodirbek Abdusattorov	2777
6	(Netherlands) Anish Giri	2760	6	(Germany) Vincent Keymer	2767
7	(France) Alireza Firouzja	2759	7	(Netherlands) Anish Giri	2764
8	(India) R Praggnanandhaa	2758	8	(India) Arjun Erigaisi	2761
9	(India) Gukesh Dommaraju	2754	9	(United States) Wesley So	2753
10	(China) Wei Yi	2754	10	(China) Wei Yi	2753
11	(United States) Wesley So	2753	11	(France) Alireza Firouzja	2744
12	(Uzbekistan) Nodirbek Abdusattorov	2751	12	(United States) Hans Moke Niemann	2742
13	(India) Viswanathan Anand	2743	13	(India) Viswanathan Anand	2739
14	(Hungary) Richárd Rapport	2741	14	(Poland) Jan-Krzysztof Duda	2739
15	(United States) Leinier Domínguez	2738	15	(China) Ding Liren	2738
16	(France) Maxime Vachier-Lagrave	2734	16	(India) R Praggnanandhaa	2735
17	(Poland) Jan-Krzysztof Duda	2731	17	(FIDE) Ian Nepomniachtchi	2733
18	(Vietnam) Lê Quang Liêm	2731	18	(United States) Leinier Domínguez	2732
19	(Azerbaijan) Shakhriyar Mamedyarov	2730	19	(India) Gukesh Dommaraju	2732
20	(United States) Levon Aronian	2729	20	(Vietnam) Lê Quang Liêm	2731

=== FIDE Open Circuit Leaderboard ===
Top 3 players leading in the 2026 FIDE Open Circuit not yet qualified were invited to play the pilot tournament. The Open Circuit ranking is a subset of the FIDE Circuit which "include[s] only tournaments with more than 50 participants and is intended to highlight performances in large open events."

- : Qualifiers – Qualified for the pilot tournament by Open circuit (Next top leaders if any current top players have already qualified through other routes)
- : Player already qualified for the pilot tournament by another path

Top 5 Standings as of September 1, 2026
No.	Player	Points	1	2	3	4	5	6	7	8
1	(Armenia) Haik M. Martirosyan	36.73	(Russia) Aeroflot Open 4th – 5.14	(Uzbekistan) Tashkent Open 1st – 8.19	(FIDE) European Individual Championship T 9th-23rd – 0.53	(Italy) Sardinia 2nd – 10.34	(France) Dole Open 2nd – 12.53			
2	(United States) Andrew Hong	30.03	(United States) St. Louis Masters T 4th-8th – 4.10	(Germany) Grenke Open 4th – 3.39	(Spain) Menorca Open 64th – 0.00	(Kazakhstan) Aktobe Open 1st – 12.56	(United States) Naroditsky Memorial – Rapid T 3rd-6th – 6.54	(United States) Naroditsky Memorial – Blitz T 14th-19th – 0.00	(France) Dole Open T 9th-20th – 0.00	(Hungary) Kanizsa Open 5th – 3.44
3	(FIDE) Ian Nepomniachtchi	23.22	(Russia) Aeroflot Open 1st – 13.57	(Italy) Sardinia 3rd – 9.65	(France) Dole Open T 21st-43rd – 0.00					
4	(Uzbekistan) Javokhir Sindarov	20.58	(United States) Naroditsky Memorial – Rapid 1st – 11.30	(United States) Naroditsky Memorial – Blitz 1st – 9.28						
5	(Iran) Amin Tabatabaei	17.06	(Iceland) Reykjavik Open 1st – 10.79	(France) Dole Open 6th – 6.27						

== Schedule ==
Date	Event		Time	
Date	Event		CET (Local)	UTC
November 9	Arrivals			
November 10	Opening Ceremony		4:00 pm	3:00 pm
November 10	Press conference		4:30 pm	3:30 pm
November 10	Blitz Swiss	Round 1	6:00 pm	5:00 pm
November 10	Blitz Swiss	Round 2	6:15 pm	5:15 pm
November 10	Blitz Swiss	Round 3	6:30 pm	5:30 pm
November 10	Blitz Swiss	Round 4	6:45 pm	5:45 pm
November 10	Blitz Swiss	Round 5	7:00 pm	6:00 pm
November 10	Blitz Swiss	Round 6	7:15 pm	6:15 pm
November 10	Blitz Swiss	Round 7	7:30 pm	6:30 pm
November 10	Blitz Swiss	Round 8	7:45 pm	6:45 pm
November 10	Blitz Swiss	Round 9	8:00 pm	7:00 pm
November 11	Group Stage	Round 1, Game 1	3:00 pm	2:00 pm
November 11	Group Stage	Round 1, Game 2	6:30 pm	5:30 pm
November 12	Group Stage	Round 2, Game 1	3:00 pm	2:00 pm
November 12	Group Stage	Round 2, Game 2	6:30 pm	5:30 pm
November 13	Group Stage	Round 3, Game 1	3:00 pm	2:00 pm
November 13	Group Stage	Round 3, Game 2	6:30 pm	5:30 pm
November 14	Group Stage	Round 4, Game 1	3:00 pm	2:00 pm
November 14	Group Stage	Round 4, Game 2	6:30 pm	5:30 pm
November 15	Group Stage	Round 5, Game 1	3:00 pm	2:00 pm
November 15	Group Stage	Round 5, Game 2	6:30 pm	5:30 pm
November 16	Rest day			
November 17	Semifinals (Day 1)	Blitz 1	3:00 pm	2:00 pm
November 17	Semifinals (Day 1)	Blitz 2	3:15 pm	2:15 pm
November 17	Semifinals (Day 1)	Blitz 3	3:30 pm	2:30 pm
November 17	Semifinals (Day 1)	Blitz 4	3:45 pm	2:45 pm
November 17	Semifinals (Day 1)	Rapid 1	4:15 pm	3:15 pm
November 17	Semifinals (Day 1)	Rapid 2	5:30 pm	4:30 pm
November 17	Semifinals (Day 1)	Fast Classic	6:45 pm	5:45 pm
November 18	Semifinals (Day 2)	Blitz 1	3:00 pm	2:00 pm
November 18	Semifinals (Day 2)	Blitz 2	3:15 pm	2:15 pm
November 18	Semifinals (Day 2)	Blitz 3	3:30 pm	2:30 pm
November 18	Semifinals (Day 2)	Blitz 4	3:45 pm	2:45 pm
November 18	Semifinals (Day 2)	Rapid 1	4:15 pm	3:15 pm
November 18	Semifinals (Day 2)	Rapid 2	5:30 pm	4:30 pm
November 18	Semifinals (Day 2)	Fast Classic	6:45 pm	5:45 pm
November 19	Finals (Day 1)	Blitz 1	3:00 pm	2:00 pm
November 19	Finals (Day 1)	Blitz 2	3:15 pm	2:15 pm
November 19	Finals (Day 1)	Blitz 3	3:30 pm	2:30 pm
November 19	Finals (Day 1)	Blitz 4	3:45 pm	2:45 pm
November 19	Finals (Day 1)	Rapid 1	4:15 pm	3:15 pm
November 19	Finals (Day 1)	Rapid 2	5:30 pm	4:30 pm
November 19	Finals (Day 1)	Fast Classic	6:45 pm	5:45 pm
November 20	Finals (Day 2)	Blitz 1	3:00 pm	2:00 pm
November 20	Finals (Day 2)	Blitz 2	3:15 pm	2:15 pm
November 20	Finals (Day 2)	Blitz 3	3:30 pm	2:30 pm
November 20	Finals (Day 2)	Blitz 4	3:45 pm	2:45 pm
November 20	Finals (Day 2)	Rapid 1	4:15 pm	3:15 pm
November 20	Finals (Day 2)	Rapid 2	5:30 pm	4:30 pm
November 20	Finals (Day 2)	Fast Classic	6:45 pm	5:45 pm
November 21	Closing ceremony			
November 22	Departures			

== Prize money and qualification opportunities ==
Apart from the prize money, there were other qualification opportunities for the top finishers of the pilot tournament as mentioned below.

=== Qualification for the Total Chess World Championship Tour 2027 ===
The top three finishers of the pilot tournament qualified for the First Leg of the Total Chess World Championship Tour.

=== Qualification for the Chess World Cup 2027 ===
The winner of the pilot tournament qualified for the Chess World Cup 2027.

=== Qualification for the Candidates Tournament 2028 ===
The top two finishers in the Total Chess World Championship Tour, based on their combined results across the three events and not already qualified, will qualify for the Candidates Tournament 2028.

=== Prize money ===
The following prize money was awarded for the following ranks respectively. Prize money between tied players was divided equally between each player tied.

Rank	Prize	Rank	Prize
1st	$80,000	13th	$22,000
2nd	$50,000	14th	$20,000
3rd	$45,000	15th	$19,000
4th	$40,000	16th	$18,000
5th	$38,000	17th	$17,000
6th	$36,000	18th	$16,000
7th	$34,000	19th	$15,000
8th	$32,000	20th	$14,000
9th	$30,000	21st	$13,000
10th	$28,000	22nd	$12,000
11th	$26,000	23rd	$11,000
12th	$24,000	24th	$10,000

== Pre-tournament Blitz Swiss ==
Notation: "1 (B 12)" indicates a win (1 point) with black pieces (B) against the player who finished 12th (Jan-Krzysztof Duda). The first tiebreak (labeled BC) is the Buchholz. The second tiebreak (labeled Rp) is the Performance rating.

Rk.	Name	Elo	1	2	3	4	5	6	7	8	9	Total	BC	Rp
1	(Norway) Magnus Carlsen	2860	1 (B 12)	1 (W 7)	0.5 (B 2)	1 (W 6)	0.5 (B 9)	1 (W 10)	0.5 (B 5)	0.5 (W 3)	1 (B 13)	7	48	2924
2	(France) Maxime Vachier-Lagrave	2734	1 (W 20)	1 (B 11)	0.5 (W 1)	1 (B 9)	1 (W 16)	0 (B 6)	0.5 (W 8)	1 (B 4)	0.5 (W 5)	6.5	46	2897
3	(United States) Levon Aronian	2714	0.5 (B 18)	0.5 (W 22)	0 (B 10)	1 (W 15)	1 (W 11)	0.5 (B 4)	1 (W 16)	0.5 (B 1)	1 (B 6)	6	42.5	2847
4	(France) Alireza Firouzja	2797	0.5 (B 19)	0.5 (W 10)	0 (B 5)	1 (W 7)	1 (B 12)	0.5 (W 3)	1 (B 13)	0 (W 2)	1 (B 11)	5.5	46	2758
5	(United States) Hans Niemann	2711	0 (W 17)	1 (B 20)	1 (W 4)	0.5 (B 16)	0.5 (W 8)	1 (B 14)	0.5 (W 1)	0.5 (W 9)	0.5 (B 2)	5.5	45.5	2776
6	(India) Arjun Erigaisi	2766	1 (W 23)	1 (B 14)	0.5 (W 16)	0 (B 1)	1 (W 17)	1 (W 2)	0 (B 9)	1 (B 8)	0 (W 3)	5.5	45	2772
7	(Hungary) Richárd Rapport	2616	1 (W 8)	0 (B 1)	0.5 (W 14)	0 (B 4)	1 (W 21)	0.5 (B 17)	1 (W 18)	0.5 (B 15)	1 (W 16)	5.5	42.5	2744
8	(United States) Fabiano Caruana	2738	0 (B 7)	1 (W 24)	0.5 (B 12)	1 (W 13)	0.5 (B 5)	1 (W 11)	0.5 (B 2)	0 (W 6)	1 (B 9)	5.5	42	2750
9	(FIDE) Ian Nepomniachtchi	2765	0.5 (B 10)	1 (W 19)	1 (B 13)	0 (W 2)	0.5 (W 1)	0.5 (B 16)	1 (W 6)	0.5 (B 5)	0 (W 8)	5	47.5	2766
10	(Netherlands) Anish Giri	2636	0.5 (W 9)	0.5 (B 4)	1 (W 3)	0.5 (B 11)	0.5 (W 14)	0 (B 1)	0.5 (W 17)	0.5 (B 16)	1 (W 18)	5	44.5	2717
11	(Germany) Vincent Keymer	2628	1 (B 15)	0 (W 2)	1 (B 22)	0.5 (W 10)	0 (B 3)	0 (B 8)	1 (W 21)	1 (B 14)	0 (W 4)	4.5	43.5	2715
12	(Poland) Jan-Krzysztof Duda	2704	0 (W 1)	1 (B 21)	0.5 (W 8)	0.5 (B 17)	0 (W 4)	0 (B 18)	1 (W 20)	1 (B 22)	0.5 (W 15)	4.5	40	2666
13	(Armenia) Haik M. Martirosyan	2686	0.5 (B 22)	1 (W 18)	0 (W 9)	0 (B 8)	1 (W 20)	1 (B 23)	0 (W 4)	1 (B 17)	0 (W 1)	4.5	39.5	2682
14	(India) R Praggnanandhaa	2712	1 (B 24)	0 (W 6)	0.5 (B 7)	1 (W 19)	0.5 (B 10)	0 (W 5)	0.5 (B 15)	0 (W 11)	1 (B 21)	4.5	37.5	2648
15	(United States) Wesley So	2745	0 (W 11)	1 (B 23)	0 (W 17)	0 (B 3)	1 (W 24)	1 (B 20)	0.5 (W 14)	0.5 (W 7)	0.5 (B 12)	4.5	35.5	2602
16	(FIDE) Vladislav Artemiev	2712	1 (W 21)	1 (B 17)	0.5 (B 6)	0.5 (W 5)	0 (B 2)	0.5 (W 9)	0 (B 3)	0.5 (W 10)	0 (B 7)	4	46.5	2604
17	(India) Vaishali Rameshbabu	2345	1 (B 5)	0 (W 16)	1 (B 15)	0.5 (W 12)	0 (B 6)	0.5 (W 7)	0.5 (B 10)	0 (W 13)	0.5 (B 24)	4	39.5	2623
18	(United States) Abhimanyu Mishra	2541	0.5 (W 3)	0 (B 13)	0 (B 19)	0.5 (W 21)	1 (B 22)	1 (W 12)	0 (B 7)	1 (W 23)	0 (B 10)	4	38	2629
19	(Vietnam) Lê Quang Liêm	2675	0.5 (W 4)	0 (B 9)	1 (W 18)	0 (B 14)	0 (W 23)	0 (B 21)	1 (W 24)	0.5 (B 20)	1 (W 22)	4	31.5	2609
20	(Azerbaijan) Shakhriyar Mamedyarov	2612	0 (B 2)	0 (W 5)	1 (B 24)	1 (W 22)	0 (B 13)	0 (W 15)	0 (B 12)	0.5 (W 19)	1 (B 23)	3.5	35	2604
21	(United States) Andrew Hong	2537	0 (B 16)	0 (W 12)	1 (W 23)	0.5 (B 18)	0 (B 7)	1 (W 19)	0 (B 11)	1 (B 24)	0 (W 14)	3.5	34	2549
22	(Uzbekistan) Nodirbek Abdusattorov	2819	0.5 (W 13)	0.5 (B 3)	0 (W 11)	0 (B 20)	0 (W 18)	1 (B 24)	0.5 (W 23)	0 (W 12)	0 (B 19)	2.5	34	2461
23	(Netherlands) Jorden van Foreest	2659	0 (B 6)	0 (W 15)	0 (B 21)	1 (W 24)	1 (B 19)	0 (W 13)	0.5 (B 22)	0 (B 18)	0 (W 20)	2.5	32.5	2479
24	(Kazakhstan) Bibisara Assaubayeva	2424	0 (W 14)	0 (B 8)	0 (W 20)	0 (B 23)	0 (B 15)	0 (W 22)	0 (B 19)	0 (W 21)	0.5 (W 17)	0.5	34.5	2205

== Group Stage ==
The group stage had the five rounds of Fast Classical time control games, with each round comprising two games with alternate colours, from 11 to 15 November. Players in bold advanced to Knockout Bracket 1, which would determine the tournament winner.

The rankings from the opening-day Blitz tournament acted as the tiebreaker for the group stage standings.

=== Group A ===
Rank	Player	Rating November 2026	FIR		DUD		JVF		ARO		HON		ABD		Total Points	TB	Qualification
1	**(France) Alireza Firouzja**	2757			1	1	3	1	1	1	3	0	3	1	15	#4	Advanced to Knockout 1
2	(Poland) Jan-Krzysztof Duda	2741	1	1			3	0	1	1	3	1	0	3	14	#12	Advanced to Knockout 2
3	(Netherlands) Jorden van Foreest	2715	1	0	3	0			0	3	0	3	3	1	14	#23	Advanced to Knockout 3
4	(United States) Levon Aronian	2719	1	1	1	1	0	3			1	1	1	1	11	#3	Advanced to Knockout 4
5	(United States) Andrew Hong	2609	3	0	1	0	0	3	1	1			1	1	11	#21	Advanced to Knockout 5
6	(Uzbekistan) Nodirbek Abdusattorov	2772	1	0	0	3	1	0	1	1	1	1			9	#22	Advanced to Knockout 6

Group A – Round 1 (11 November)
Game 1
Alireza Firouzja	3–0	Nodirbek Abdusattorov
Jorden van Foreest	0–3	Levon Aronian
Andrew Hong	1–1	Jan-Krzysztof Duda
Game 2
Nodirbek Abdusattorov	1–1	Alireza Firouzja
Levon Aronian	0–3	Jorden van Foreest
Jan-Krzysztof Duda	3–0	Andrew Hong

Group A – Round 2 (12 November)
Game 1
Nodirbek Abdusattorov	0–3	Jan-Krzysztof Duda
Levon Aronian	1–1	Andrew Hong
Alireza Firouzja	3–0	Jorden van Foreest
Game 2
Jan-Krzysztof Duda	0–3	Nodirbek Abdusattorov
Andrew Hong	1–1	Levon Aronian
Jorden van Foreest	1–1	Alireza Firouzja

Group A – Round 3 (13 November)
Game 1
Jorden van Foreest	3–0	Nodirbek Abdusattorov
Andrew Hong	3–0	Alireza Firouzja
Jan-Krzysztof Duda	1–1	Levon Aronian
Game 2
Nodirbek Abdusattorov	1–1	Jorden van Foreest
Alireza Firouzja	3–0	Andrew Hong
Levon Aronian	1–1	Jan-Krzysztof Duda

Group A – Round 4 (14 November)
Game 1
Nodirbek Abdusattorov	1–1	Levon Aronian
Alireza Firouzja	1–1	Jan-Krzysztof Duda
Jorden van Foreest	0–3	Andrew Hong
Game 2
Levon Aronian	1–1	Nodirbek Abdusattorov
Jan-Krzysztof Duda	1–1	Alireza Firouzja
Andrew Hong	0–3	Jorden van Foreest

Group A – Round 5 (15 November)
Game 1
Andrew Hong	1–1	Nodirbek Abdusattorov
Jan-Krzysztof Duda	3–0	Jorden van Foreest
Levon Aronian	1–1	Alireza Firouzja
Game 2
Nodirbek Abdusattorov	1–1	Andrew Hong
Jorden van Foreest	3–0	Jan-Krzysztof Duda
Alireza Firouzja	1–1	Levon Aronian

=== Group B ===
Rank	Player	Rating November 2026	CAR		LE		RAP		KEY		ART		PRA		Total Points	TB	Qualification
1	**(United States) Fabiano Caruana**	2783			1	1	1	3	1	3	1	0	3	3	17	#8	Advanced to Knockout 1
2	(Vietnam) Lê Quang Liêm	2732	1	1			1	1	3	1	3	1	1	1	14	#19	Advanced to Knockout 2
3	(Hungary) Richárd Rapport	2718	0	1	1	1			1	1	1	1	3	1	11	#7	Advanced to Knockout 3
4	(Germany) Vincent Keymer	2761	0	1	1	0	1	1			1	3	1	1	10	#11	Advanced to Knockout 4
5	(FIDE) Vladislav Artemiev	2653	3	1	1	0	1	1	0	1			1	1	10	#16	Advanced to Knockout 5
6	(India) R Praggnanandhaa	2763	0	0	1	1	1	0	1	1	1	1			7	#14	Advanced to Knockout 6

Group B – Round 1 (11 November)
Game 1
Vladislav Artemiev	1–1	Le Quang Liem
Richard Rapport	0–3	Fabiano Caruana
R Praggnanandhaa	1–1	Vincent Keymer
Game 2
Le Quang Liem	3–0	Vladislav Artemiev
Fabiano Caruana	1–1	Richard Rapport
Vincent Keymer	1–1	R Praggnanandhaa

Group B – Round 2 (12 November)
Game 1
Le Quang Liem	3–0	Vincent Keymer
Fabiano Caruana	3–0	R Praggnanandhaa
Vladislav Artemiev	1–1	Richard Rapport
Game 2
Vincent Keymer	1–1	Le Quang Liem
R Praggnanandhaa	0–3	Fabiano Caruana
Richard Rapport	1–1	Vladislav Artemiev

Group B – Round 3 (13 November)
Game 1
Richard Rapport	1–1	Le Quang Liem
R Praggnanandhaa	1–1	Vladislav Artemiev
Vincent Keymer	0–3	Fabiano Caruana
Game 2
Le Quang Liem	1–1	Richard Rapport
Vladislav Artemiev	1–1	R Praggnanandhaa
Fabiano Caruana	1–1	Vincent Keymer

Group B – Round 4 (14 November)
Game 1
Le Quang Liem	1–1	Fabiano Caruana
Vladislav Artemiev	1–1	Vincent Keymer
Richard Rapport	3–0	R Praggnanandhaa
Game 2
Fabiano Caruana	1–1	Le Quang Liem
Vincent Keymer	3–0	Vladislav Artemiev
R Praggnanandhaa	1–1	Richard Rapport

Group B – Round 5 (15 November)
Game 1
R Praggnanandhaa	1–1	Le Quang Liem
Vincent Keymer	1–1	Richard Rapport
Fabiano Caruana	1–1	Vladislav Artemiev
Game 2
Le Quang Liem	1–1	R Praggnanandhaa
Richard Rapport	1–1	Vincent Keymer
Vladislav Artemiev	3–0	Fabiano Caruana

=== Group C ===
Rank	Player	Rating November 2026	GIR		NEP		MAR		MAM		CAR		MIS		Total Points	TB	Qualification
1	**(Netherlands) Anish Giri**	2747			3	1	3	0	1	1	1	1	3	1	15	#10	Advanced to Knockout 1
2	(FIDE) Ian Nepomniachtchi	2719	1	0			3	1	1	1	1	1	3	1	13	#9	Advanced to Knockout 2
3	(Armenia) Haik M. Martirosyan	2669	3	0	1	0			0	3	3	1	1	1	13	#13	Advanced to Knockout 3
4	(Azerbaijan) Shakhriyar Mamedyarov	2709	1	1	1	1	0	3			1	1	1	1	11	#20	Advanced to Knockout 4
5	(Norway) Magnus Carlsen	2823	1	1	1	1	1	0	1	1			1	1	9	#1	Advanced to Knockout 5
6	(United States) Abhimanyu Mishra	2644	1	0	1	0	1	1	1	1	1	1			8	#18	Advanced to Knockout 6

Group C – Round 1 (11 November)
Game 1
Anish Giri	1–1	Magnus Carlsen
Haik M. Martirosyan	0–3	Shakhriyar Mamedyarov
Ian Nepomniachtchi	3–0	Abhimanyu Mishra
Game 2
Magnus Carlsen	1–1	Anish Giri
Shakhriyar Mamedyarov	0–3	Haik M. Martirosyan
Abhimanyu Mishra	1–1	Ian Nepomniachtchi

Group C – Round 2 (12 November)
Game 1
Magnus Carlsen	1–1	Abhimanyu Mishra
Shakhriyar Mamedyarov	1–1	Ian Nepomniachtchi
Anish Giri	3–0	Haik M. Martirosyan
Game 2
Abhimanyu Mishra	1–1	Magnus Carlsen
Ian Nepomniachtchi	1–1	Shakhriyar Mamedyarov
Haik M. Martirosyan	3–0	Anish Giri

Group C – Round 3 (13 November)
Game 1
Haik M. Martirosyan	3–0	Magnus Carlsen
Ian Nepomniachtchi	1–1	Anish Giri
Abhimanyu Mishra	1–1	Shakhriyar Mamedyarov
Game 2
Magnus Carlsen	1–1	Haik M. Martirosyan
Anish Giri	3–0	Ian Nepomniachtchi
Shakhriyar Mamedyarov	1–1	Abhimanyu Mishra

Group C – Round 4 (14 November)
Game 1
Magnus Carlsen	1–1	Shakhriyar Mamedyarov
Anish Giri	3–0	Abhimanyu Mishra
Haik M. Martirosyan	1–1	Ian Nepomniachtchi
Game 2
Shakhriyar Mamedyarov	1–1	Magnus Carlsen
Abhimanyu Mishra	1–1	Anish Giri
Ian Nepomniachtchi	3–0	Haik M. Martirosyan

Group C – Round 5 (15 November)
Game 1
Ian Nepomniachtchi	1–1	Magnus Carlsen
Abhimanyu Mishra	1–1	Haik M. Martirosyan
Shakhriyar Mamedyarov	1–1	Anish Giri
Game 2
Magnus Carlsen	1–1	Ian Nepomniachtchi
Haik M. Martirosyan	1–1	Abhimanyu Mishra
Anish Giri	1–1	Shakhriyar Mamedyarov

=== Group D ===
Rank	Player	Rating November 2026	MVL		NIE		ERI		SO		ASA		VAI		Total Points	TB	Qualification
1	**(France) Maxime Vachier-Lagrave**	2707			3	1	1	0	3	1	3	1	1	3	17	#2	Advanced to Knockout 1
2	(United States) Hans Niemann	2697	1	0			1	1	3	0	3	1	3	3	16	#5	Advanced to Knockout 2
3	(India) Arjun Erigaisi	2746	3	1	1	1			1	3	0	3	3	0	16	#6	Advanced to Knockout 3
4	(United States) Wesley So	2771	1	0	3	0	0	1			1	1	3	3	13	#15	Advanced to Knockout 4
5	(Kazakhstan) Bibisara Assaubayeva	2532	1	0	1	0	0	3	1	1			3	0	10	#24	Advanced to Knockout 5
6	(India) Vaishali Rameshbabu	2452	0	1	0	0	3	0	0	0	3	0			7	#17	Advanced to Knockout 6

Group D – Round 1 (11 November)
Game 1
Vaishali Rameshbabu	0–3	Maxime Vachier-Lagrave
Hans Niemann	1–1	Arjun Erigaisi
Bibisara Assaubayeva	1–1	Wesley So
Game 2
Maxime Vachier-Lagrave	1–1	Vaishali Rameshbabu
Arjun Erigaisi	1–1	Hans Niemann
Wesley So	1–1	Bibisara Assaubayeva

Group D – Round 2 (12 November)
Game 1
Maxime Vachier-Lagrave	3–0	Wesley So
Arjun Erigaisi	0–3	Bibisara Assaubayeva
Vaishali Rameshbabu	0–3	Hans Niemann
Game 2
Wesley So	1–1	Maxime Vachier-Lagrave
Bibisara Assaubayeva	0–3	Arjun Erigaisi
Hans Niemann	3–0	Vaishali Rameshbabu

Group D – Round 3 (13 November)
Game 1
Hans Niemann	1–1	Maxime Vachier-Lagrave
Bibisara Assaubayeva	3–0	Vaishali Rameshbabu
Wesley So	0–3	Arjun Erigaisi
Game 2
Maxime Vachier-Lagrave	3–0	Hans Niemann
Vaishali Rameshbabu	3–0	Bibisara Assaubayeva
Arjun Erigaisi	1–1	Wesley So

Group D – Round 4 (14 November)
Game 1
Maxime Vachier-Lagrave	1–1	Arjun Erigaisi
Vaishali Rameshbabu	0–3	Wesley So
Hans Niemann	3–0	Bibisara Assaubayeva
Game 2
Arjun Erigaisi	3–0	Maxime Vachier-Lagrave
Wesley So	3–0	Vaishali Rameshbabu
Bibisara Assaubayeva	1–1	Hans Niemann

Group D – Round 5 (15 November)
Game 1
Bibisara Assaubayeva	1–1	Maxime Vachier-Lagrave
Wesley So	3–0	Hans Niemann
Arjun Erigaisi	3–0	Vaishali Rameshbabu
Game 2
Maxime Vachier-Lagrave	3–0	Bibisara Assaubayeva
Hans Niemann	3–0	Wesley So
Vaishali Rameshbabu	3–0	Arjun Erigaisi

== Knockout Stage ==
Each match of the knockout stage was played over two days, from 17 to 20 November. Each day acted as a set comprising four blitz games, two rapid games and one Fast Classical game. If a match was tied after both days, an armageddon game would be played to determine the winner.

The winner of Knockout Bracket 1 will become the winner of the tournament.

=== Knockout Bracket 1 ===
Semifinals
(France) Maxime Vachier-Lagrave	5.5	7.5
(Netherlands) Anish Giri	14.5	12.5
(France) Alireza Firouzja	12	5	1
(United States) Fabiano Caruana	8	15	0

Final
(Netherlands) Anish Giri	11	8	0.5
(France) Alireza Firouzja (Note: Firouzja won the final as black in the armageddon game.)	9	12	0.5
3rd-place Match
(France) Maxime Vachier-Lagrave	9	9.5
(United States) Fabiano Caruana	11	10.5

=== Knockout Bracket 2 ===
Semifinals
(United States) Hans Niemann	13.5	15.5
(Vietnam) Lê Quang Liêm	6.5	4.5
(FIDE) Ian Nepomniachtchi	15	5.5	0
(Poland) Jan-Krzysztof Duda	5	14.5	1

5th-place Match
(United States) Hans Niemann	13.5	9	1
(Poland) Jan-Krzysztof Duda	6.5	11	0
7th-place Match
(Vietnam) Lê Quang Liêm	6	14	0
(FIDE) Ian Nepomniachtchi	14	6	1

=== Knockout Bracket 3 ===
Semifinals
(India) Arjun Erigaisi	11.5	8	1
(Netherlands) Jorden van Foreest	8.5	12	0
(Hungary) Richárd Rapport	9	2
(Armenia) Haik M. Martirosyan	11	18

9th-place Match
(India) Arjun Erigaisi	5.5	9
(Armenia) Haik M. Martirosyan	14.5	11
11th-place Match
(Netherlands) Jorden van Foreest	9	12	0
(Hungary) Richárd Rapport	11	8	1

=== Knockout Bracket 4 ===
Semifinals
(United States) Levon Aronian	9	13.5	1
(Azerbaijan) Shakhriyar Mamedyarov	11	6.5	0
(Germany) Vincent Keymer	6	6.5
(United States) Wesley So	14	13.5

13th-place Match
(United States) Levon Aronian	7.5	11	0.5
(United States) Wesley So (Note: So won the 13th-place match as black in the armageddon game.)	12.5	9	0.5
15th-place Match
(Azerbaijan) Shakhriyar Mamedyarov	5.5	10
(Germany) Vincent Keymer	14.5	10

=== Knockout Bracket 5 ===
Semifinals
(Norway) Magnus Carlsen	11.5	10
(Kazakhstan) Bibisara Assaubayeva	8.5	10
(FIDE) Vladislav Artemiev	17	8	1
(United States) Andrew Hong	3	12	0

17th-place Match
(Norway) Magnus Carlsen	11	4.5	1
(FIDE) Vladislav Artemiev	9	15.5	0
19th-place Match
(Kazakhstan) Bibisara Assaubayeva	5	7
(United States) Andrew Hong	15	13

=== Knockout Bracket 6 ===
Semifinals
(India) R Praggnanandhaa	11	11.5
(Uzbekistan) Nodirbek Abdusattorov	9	8.5
(India) Vaishali Rameshbabu	7	9
(United States) Abhimanyu Mishra	13	11

21st-place Match
(India) R Praggnanandhaa	12	15
(United States) Abhimanyu Mishra	8	5
23rd-place Match
(Uzbekistan) Nodirbek Abdusattorov	16	20
(India) Vaishali Rameshbabu	4	0

== Standings ==
A prize pool of US$650,000 was offered for the tournament.

Pos.	Player	Prize money	Qualification
1st	(France) Alireza Firouzja	$80,000	Qualified for the First Leg of the Total Chess World Championship Tour
2nd	(Netherlands) Anish Giri	$50,000	Qualified for the First Leg of the Total Chess World Championship Tour
3rd	(United States) Fabiano Caruana	$45,000	Qualified for the First Leg of the Total Chess World Championship Tour
4th	(France) Maxime Vachier-Lagrave	$40,000	
5th	(United States) Hans Niemann	$38,000	
6th	(Poland) Jan-Krzysztof Duda	$36,000	
7th	(FIDE) Ian Nepomniachtchi	$34,000	
8th	(Vietnam) Lê Quang Liêm	$32,000	
9th	(Armenia) Haik M. Martirosyan	$30,000	
10th	(India) Arjun Erigaisi	$28,000	
11th	(Hungary) Richárd Rapport	$26,000	
12th	(Netherlands) Jorden van Foreest	$24,000	
13th	(United States) Wesley So	$22,000	
14th	(United States) Levon Aronian	$20,000	
15th	(Germany) Vincent Keymer	$19,000	
16th	(Azerbaijan) Shakhriyar Mamedyarov	$18,000	
17th	(Norway) Magnus Carlsen	$17,000	
18th	(FIDE) Vladislav Artemiev	$16,000	
19th	(United States) Andrew Hong	$15,000	
20th	(Kazakhstan) Bibisara Assaubayeva	$14,000	
21st	(India) R Praggnanandhaa	$13,000	
22nd	(United States) Abhimanyu Mishra	$12,000	
23rd	(Uzbekistan) Nodirbek Abdusattorov	$11,000	
24th	(India) Vaishali Rameshbabu	$10,000	
