= 2026–2027 FIDE Circuit =

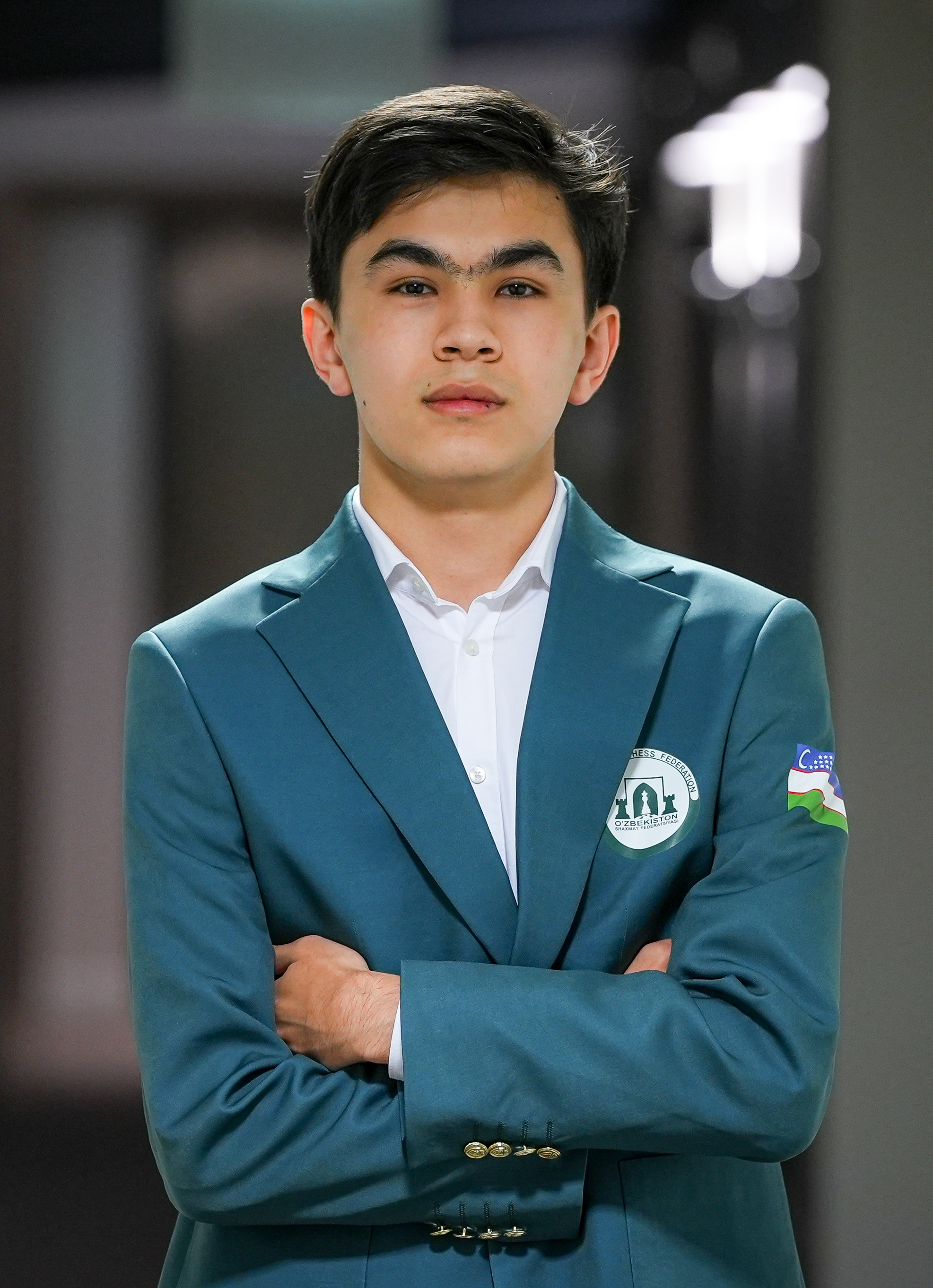
- FIDE Circuit leader Javokhir Sindarov
- Sport: Chess
- Duration: 5 January 2026 – December 2027

Seasons
- ← 2025

The 2026–2027 FIDE Circuit is a system comprising the top chess tournaments in 2026 and 2027, which will serve as a qualification path for the Candidates Tournament 2028. Players receive points based on their performance and the strength of the tournament. A player's final Circuit score will be the sum of their twelve best results of the years.

It also includes a sub-ranking list which consists scores of only tournaments with more than 50 participants, serving as a qualification path for Total Chess World Championship Tour events.

Unlike every year before 2026, this FIDE Circuit will be combined of tournaments played in 2026 and 2027. All Circuits till 2025 included events of the year itself only.

This is an open category equivalent to 2026-2027 FIDE Women's Circuit (as in women category).

== Eligible tournaments ==
As per regulation 2.1 of FIDE Circuit 2026–2027 Regulations, eligible tournaments are :-

- FIDE‐rated individual over‐the‐board standard tournaments
- World Rapid Championships, 2026 and 2027
- World Blitz Championships, 2026 and 2027
- Continental over‐the‐board Rapid and Blitz Championships 2026 and 2027
- Other over‐the‐board FIDE‐rated Rapid & Blitz tournaments
- Other pre‐approved FIDE‐rated tournaments

None of those mentioned above (except World Chess Championship 2026 and World Rapid and Blitz Championships, 2026 and 2027) are eligible tournaments if they do not follow any of the conditions mentioned below. World Chess Championship 2026 and World Rapid and Blitz Championships, 2026 and 2027 shall be considered irrespective of the conditions below.

- The tournaments must finish between
  - 1 January 2026 and 21 December 2026 or 1 January 2027 and 21 December 2027 (for National Championships, zonal and continental tournaments and traditional open tournaments with at least 50 players).
  - 1 January 2026 and 15 December 2026 or 1 January 2027 and 15 December 2027 (for all other tournaments).
- The tournament must have at least
  - 6 players with TAR of at least 2700 (for double round robin tournaments)
  - 8 players (for all other formats)
- The number of rounds in the tournament must be at least
  - 4 (for knockout tournaments)
  - 7 (for all other formats)
- TAR of the rated tournaments not pre-approved by FIDE must not be less than
  - 2550 (for FIDE Rated Individual standard tournaments, World Rapid and Blitz Championships and Continental Rapid and Blitz Championships.)
  - 2650 (for other over‐the‐board FIDE‐rated Rapid & Blitz tournaments.)
- The TAR is the average rating of top 12 players in the tournament (If less than 12 players in the tournament, then the average rating of all the players in the tournament).
- Players must represent at least 3 different Member Federations or Affiliated Members.
- Not more than 50% of the 20 highest‐rated players (or all players if fewer than 20 players) shall represent one federation.

== Points system ==
=== Event points ===
Circuit points obtained by a player from a tournament are calculated as follows:

$$P = B \times k \times w$$

where:

- $P$ - Points obtained by player from the tournament
- $B$ - Basic points
- $k$ - Tournament strength factor, calculated as $k = (TAR-2500) / 100$
- $w$ - Tournament weighting
  - 1.5 - World Chess Championship 2026
  - 1.0 - Standard (classical) tournaments with at most 1 'multi game-day', a day on which multiple games are played
  - 0.9 - Double Round Robin Tournaments with 6-7 players and classical tournaments with 2 multi-game days
  - 0.85 - Standard tournaments with 3 multi-game days
  - 0.8 - Total Chess World Championship Tour, World Rapid Championship, Knockout Tournaments with fewer than 6 rounds and standard tournaments with 4 multi-game days
  - 0.75 - Standard tournaments with 5 multi-game days
  - 0.7 - Standard tournaments with 6 or more multi-game days
  - 0.6 - World Blitz Championship, Continental Rapid Championships, and other eligible rapid tournaments
  - 0.5 - Mixed Rapid & Blitz tournaments
  - 0.4 - Continental Blitz Championships and other eligible blitz tournaments

If multiple weighting coefficients apply, these are multiplied together.

=== Basic points ===
Basic points for a tournament are awarded depending on the tournament format:

- Swiss-system: Top 8 (within top half of ranking), ties included.
- Double round-robins 6-7 players: Top 2 with ties.
- Round-robins 8-10 players: Top 3 with ties.
- Round-robins 11-13 players: Top 4 with ties.
- Round-robins 14 players: Top 5 with ties.
- Knockout: Third round or later, up to 8 players.

Points are awarded as follows:

1st	2nd	3rd	4th	5th	6th	7th	8th
11/10	8	7	6	5	4	3	2

- 11 points for an outright winner with no tie-break criteria applied (in Knockout tournaments, victory in the Final after only the games with the longest time control have been played). Otherwise, 10 basic points will be used for calculation.
- For tied positions, basic points are calculated as 50% of points for final ranking as determined by tournament's tie-break rules, plus 50% of the sum of basic points assigned for the tied places divided by the number of tied players. If no tie-break rule is applied, basic points are shared equally among all tied players.

=== Candidates Tournament Points ===
For the Candidates Tournament 2026, Top five with ties will earn the points.

=== World Championship 2026 ===
For the World Championship 2026, runner-up will receive points in the Circuit equal to the basic points for 2nd place multiplied by the k-factor and multiplied by 1.5. The TPR for this event will calculated as the player's performance rating.

=== Total World Championship Tour ===
For Total Chess World Championship Tour, Top 5 finishers in each stage, including the Pilot tournament will be given points in the Circuit by the k-factor and multiplied by 0.8 . Also each stage of the tour is deemed as a Standard Tournament.

=== Player's total and ranking ===
A player's point total for the ranking is the sum of their best 12 tournaments with the following criteria:

Tournaments	Standard events with under 50 players allowed	Rapid/Blitz allowed
8–10	6	3
11	7	4
12	8	4

- If player has 11 or 12 tournaments to count:
  - No more than 7 or 8 respectively standard tournaments with the participation of less than 50 players can be counted.
  - No more than 4 rapid/blitz tournaments can be counted.
- If player has 10 tournaments or less:
  - No more than 6 standard tournaments with participation of less than 50 players can be counted.
  - No more than 3 rapid/blitz tournament can be counted.

Tournaments that could be included in player's results are as follows:

- Official FIDE tournaments.
- National Championships.
- Other eligible tournaments, counting all tournaments with minimum TAR of 2650 and up to two lower tournaments per host country with TAR below 2650.

== Tournaments ==
"(M)" denotes the Masters section while "(Ch)" denotes the Challengers section. "Open" refers to classical tournaments with 50 or more participants.

- : Ongoing events

2026–2027 FIDE Circuit – Eligible Tournaments
Tournament	Location	Date	Type	P#	TAR	Winner
Rilton Cup	(Sweden) Stockholm	27 December 2025 – 5 January 2026	Open	170	2551 1/12	(China) Xu Xiangyu
Floripa Open 2026	(Brazil) Florianópolis	17–25 January 2026	Open	542	2561 1/12	(Brazil) André Diamant
Tata Steel (M)	(Netherlands) Wijk aan Zee	17 January – 1 February 2026	Round robin	14	2734 1/3	(Uzbekistan) Nodirbek Abdusattorov
Tata Steel (Ch)	(Netherlands) Wijk aan Zee	17 January – 1 February 2026	Round robin	14	2567 5/6	(United States) Andy Woodward
Al-Beruniy Masters	(Uzbekistan) Tashkent	12–22 February 2026	Round robin	10	2602	(Armenia) Aram Hakobyan
Prague (M)	(Czech Republic) Prague	24 February – 6 March 2026	Round robin	10	2710 2/5	(Uzbekistan) Nodirbek Abdusattorov
Prague (Ch)	(Czech Republic) Prague	24 February – 6 March 2026	Round robin	10	2552	(Czech Republic) Václav Finěk
Saint Louis Masters	(United States) St. Louis	25 February – 1 March 2026	Open	70	2628 1/6	(United States) Mikhail Antipov
Aeroflot Open	(Russia) Moscow	27 February – 6 March 2026	Open	169	2645 1/6	(FIDE) Ian Nepomniachtchi
Tashkent Open – Agzamov Memorial	(Uzbekistan) Tashkent	17–26 March 2026	Open	101	2586 1/6	(Armenia) Haik M. Martirosyan
Reykjavik Open	(Iceland) Reykjavík	25–31 March 2026	Open	422	2609	(Iran) Amin Tabatabaei
Candidates Tournament	(Cyprus) Pegeia	28 March – 16 April 2026	FIDE	8	2749 1/4	(Uzbekistan) Javokhir Sindarov
Open Internacional Alicante	(Spain) Alicante	1–6 April 2026	Open	520	2574 3/4	(Ukraine) Igor Kovalenko
Grenke Open	(Germany) Karlsruhe	2–6 April 2026	Open	1098	2590 3/4	(Uzbekistan) Mukhammadzokhid Suyarov
European Individual Championship	(Poland) Katowice	7–19 April 2026	Continental	521	2644 1/12	(Ukraine) Roman Dehtiarov
Menorca Masters	(Spain) Menorca	7–12 April 2026	Rapid	6	2704 2/3	(India) Nihal Sarin
Menorca Open	(Spain) Menorca	7–12 April 2026	Open	420	2606 1/4	(United States) Abhimanyu Mishra
Karpov International Tournament	(Russia) Khanty-Mansiysk	10–17 April 2026	Round robin	10	2610 7/10	(Belarus) Denis Lazavik
Bangkok Chess Club Open	(Thailand) Bangkok	11–19 April 2026	Open	241	2551 1/3	(Vietnam) Đầu Khương Duy
Baku Open	(Azerbaijan) Baku	28 April – 6 May 2026	Open	100	2557 7/12	(Iran) Sina Movahed
TePe Sigeman	(Sweden) Malmö	1–7 May 2026	Round robin	8	2707 1/8	(Norway) Magnus Carlsen
Sardinia World Chess Festival	(Italy) Orosei	3–10 May 2026	Open	163	2637 5/6	(Germany) Frederik Svane
GCT Super Rapid & Blitz Poland	(Poland) Warsaw	5–9 May 2026	Rapid & Blitz	10	2735 7/10	(United States) Hans Niemann
GCT Super Chess Classic Romania	(Romania) Bucharest	14–23 May 2026	Round robin	10	2743 4/5	(Germany) Vincent Keymer
Norway Chess	(Norway) Oslo	25 May – 5 June 2026	Double round robin	6	2762 5/6	(India) R Praggnanandhaa
Stepan Avagyan Memorial	(Armenia) Jermuk	28 May – 6 June 2026	Round robin	10	2657 1/10	(United States) Samuel Sevian
Asian Individual Championship	(Mongolia) Ulaanbaatar	28 May – 7 June 2026	Continental	143	2609 1/12	(China) Kong Xiangrui
Aktobe Open – Vladimir Dvorkovich Memorial	(Kazakhstan) Aktobe	3–11 June 2026	Open	81	2614 1/6	(United States) Andrew Hong
UzChess Cup (M)	(Uzbekistan) Tashkent	7–15 June 2026	Round robin	10	2698 2/5	(Uzbekistan) Mukhiddin Madaminov
UzChess Cup (Ch)	(Uzbekistan) Tashkent	8–15 June 2026	Round robin	10	2580	(Azerbaijan) Mahammad Muradli
GCT Super Rapid & Blitz Croatia	(Croatia) Zagreb	1–5 July 2026	Rapid & Blitz	10	2722 4/5	(France) Alireza Firouzja
Naroditsky Memorial – Rapid	(United States) Charlotte	3 July 2026	Rapid; Open	93	2698 1/6	(Uzbekistan) Javokhir Sindarov
Naroditsky Memorial – Blitz	(United States) Charlotte	4–5 July 2026	Blitz; Open	93	2711	(Uzbekistan) Javokhir Sindarov
Chennai Grand Masters	(India) Chennai	15–23 July 2026	Round robin	8	2726 1/2	(France) Alireza Firouzja
Dole Open	(France) Aix-en-Provence	18–26 July 2026	Open	306	2647 5/12	(Armenia) Robert Hovhannisyan
Oskemen Open	(Kazakhstan) Oskemen	20–30 July 2026	Open	79	2596 5/6	(FIDE) Andrey Esipenko
Asian Rapid Championship 2026	Hong Kong	28–29 July 2026	Rapid; Continental	128	2578 2/3	(FIDE) Aleksey Grebnev
Asian Blitz Championship 2026	Hong Kong	30 July 2026	Blitz; Continental	114	2578 2/3	(Vietnam) Lê Tuấn Minh
Dortmund Sparkassen Chess Trophy	(Germany) Dortmund	1–9 August 2026	Open	208	2567 2/3	(Norway) Elham Amar
GCT St. Louis Rapid & Blitz	(United States) St. Louis	2–6 August 2026	Rapid & Blitz	10	2748 3/5	(India) R Praggnanandhaa
Spilimbergo International Chess Festival	(Italy) Spilimbergo	8–15 August 2026	Open	241	2570	(Belgium) Daniel Dardha
GCT Sinquefield Cup	(United States) St. Louis	10–20 August 2026	Round robin	10	2747 4/5	(United States) Wesley So
Kanizsa Open and Hungarian Individual Open Championship	(Hungary) Nagykanizsa	15–23 August 2026	Open	226	2605 1/12	(India) Pranesh M
Rubinstein Memorial	(Poland) Polanica-Zdrój	15–23 August 2026	Round robin	10	2641 4/5	(United States) Awonder Liang
Abu Dhabi Masters	(United Arab Emirates) Abu Dhabi	15–24 August 2026	Open	109	2576 2/3	(Uzbekistan) Jakhongir Vakhidov
Chess Slovak Open	(Slovakia) Skalica	22–30 August 2026	Round robin	10	2603 2/5	(India) Aditya Mittal (United States) Abhimanyu Mishra
Russian Championship Superfinal	(Russia) Rostov-on-Don	1–12 October 2026	National	12	2576 5/12	(FIDE) Andrey Esipenko
U.S. Championship	(United States) St. Louis	9–22 October 2026	National	12	2686 11/12	(United States) Wesley So
Atyrau Open	(Kazakhstan) Atyrau	12–20 October 2026	Open	109	2591	(Armenia) Emin Ohanyan
KazChess Masters	(Kazakhstan) Almaty	25 October – 4 November 2026	Round Robin	10	2573 1/10	(Belarus) Denis Lazavik
Open International Bavarian Chess Championship	(Germany) Gmund am Tegernsee	31 October – 8 November 2026	Open	548	2568 11/12	(India) Krishnan Sasikiran
Total Chess 2026 Pilot	(Hungary) Budapest	10–21 November 2026	FIDE	24	2759 7/12	(France) Alireza Firouzja
World Chess Championship 2026	(Switzerland) Geneva	24 November – 12 December 2026	FIDE	2	2746	
U.S. Masters	(United States) Charlotte	25–29 November 2026	Open			
London Chess Classic – Masters	(United Kingdom) London	25 November – 4 December 2026	Round Robin	10	2646 1/10	
London Chess Classic – Swiss	(United Kingdom) London	27 November – 4 December 2026	Open			
President Cup – Masters	(Uzbekistan) Tashkent	28 November – 6 December 2026	Round robin	10	2602 2/5	
Kazakhstan Chess Cup	(Kazakhstan) Almaty	1–11 December 2026	Open			
Elllobregat Open	(Spain) Sant Boi de Llobregat	3–8 December 2026	Open			
London Chess Classic – Super Rapidplay	(United Kingdom) London	5–6 December 2026	Rapid; Open			
Sunway Sitges International Festival	(Spain) Sitges	12–22 December 2026	Open			
World Rapid Championship 2026	(Turkey) Istanbul	26–28 December 2026	Rapid; FIDE			
World Blitz Championship 2026	(Turkey) Istanbul	29–30 December 2026	Blitz; FIDE			
Floripa Open 2027	(Brazil) Florianópolis	23–31 January 2027	Open			

== Ranking ==
=== 2026–2027 FIDE Circuit Standings ===
At the end of 2027, the top two finishers in the Circuit will qualify for the Candidates Tournament 2028, provided that they play in at least 8 tournaments (including at least 5 in standard time controls) and play at least 4 standard tournaments with participations of more than 50 players (if they played in 11 or 12 tournaments) or at least 3 standard tournament with participations of more than 50 players (if they played in 10 tournaments).

Tournament results which can't be counted for qualification for the Candidates Tournament 2028 are marked in pink.

"(M)" denotes the Masters section of tournaments while "(Ch)" denotes the Challengers section.

- : Current leaders – set to qualify for Candidates Tournament 2028 (Next top leader if the current top player has already qualified through another route)
- : Current World Champion – ineligible for Candidates Tournament 2028 qualification
- : Player qualified for Candidates Tournament 2028 via another path
- : Player ineligible for Candidates Tournament 2028 qualification

Top 50 Standings as of 8 November 2026
No.	Player	Points	Events	1	2	3	4	5	6	7	8	9	10	11	12
1	(Uzbekistan) Javokhir Sindarov	93.89	8	(Netherlands) Tata Steel (M) 2nd – 18.75	(FIDE) Candidates 1st – 27.42	GCT Poland T 7th-9th – 0.00	GCT Romania T 3rd-4th – 8.53	(United States) Naroditsky Memorial – Rapid 1st – 11.30	(United States) Naroditsky Memorial – Blitz 1st – 9.28	(United States) GCT St. Louis 2nd – 9.94	(United States) Sinquefield Cup T 3rd-4th – 8.67	Optional			
2	(United States) Wesley So	93.11	9	GCT Poland 3rd – 8.25	GCT Romania T 3rd-4th – 8.53	Norway Chess 2nd – 18.92	(United States) Naroditsky Memorial – Rapid T 7th-15th – 0.66	(United States) Naroditsky Memorial – Blitz 2nd – 6.75	(United States) GCT St. Louis 3rd – 8.70	(United States) Sinquefield Cup 1st – 23.54	(United States) U.S. Championship 1st – 17.76	(FIDE) Total Chess 2026 Pilot 13th – 0.00	Optional		
3	(United States) Fabiano Caruana	85.01	10	(United States) St. Louis Masters 2nd – 8.20	(FIDE) Candidates 3rd – 17.45	GCT Poland 2nd – 9.43	GCT Romania 2nd – 19.50	(United States) Naroditsky Memorial – Rapid T 17th-26th – 0.00	(United States) Naroditsky Memorial – Blitz T 20th-30th – 0.00	(United States) GCT St. Louis T 5th-7th – 0.00	(United States) Sinquefield Cup T 5th-8th – 0.00	(United States) U.S. Championship 2nd – 15.89	(FIDE) Total Chess 2026 Pilot 3rd - 14.54	Optional	
4	(Uzbekistan) Nodirbek Abdusattorov	65.64	7	(Netherlands) Tata Steel (M) 1st – 25.78	(Czech Republic) Prague (M) 1st – 23.14	(Sweden) TePe Sigeman T 3rd-4th – 7.25	(Uzbekistan) UzChess Cup (M) 6th – 0.00	GCT Croatia 2nd – 9.47	(India) Chennai Grand Masters T 4th-6th – 0.00	(FIDE) Total Chess 2026 Pilot 23rd – 0.00	Required	Optional			
5	(India) R Praggnanandhaa	64.65	8	(Netherlands) Tata Steel (M) T 12th-13th – 0.00	(FIDE) Candidates 7th – 0.00	GCT Romania T 5th-9th – 0.00	Norway Chess 1st – 26.02	GCT Croatia T 3rd-4th – 3.90	(United States) GCT St. Louis 1st - 13.67	(United States) Sinquefield Cup 2nd – 21.06	(FIDE) Total Chess 2026 Pilot 21st – 0.00	Optional			
6	(France) Alireza Firouzja	55.23	5	GCT Poland 5th – 0.00	GCT Romania 10th – 0.00	Norway Chess 3rd – 0.00	GCT Croatia 1st – 10.58	(India) Chennai Grand Masters 1st – 24.92	(FIDE) Total Chess 2026 Pilot 1st - 19.73	Required		Optional			
7	(Germany) Vincent Keymer	49.55	8	(Netherlands) Tata Steel (M) T 3rd-5th – 14.06	(Czech Republic) Prague (M) T 7th-8th – 0.00	GCT Romania 1st – 26.82	Norway Chess 5th – 0.00	GCT Croatia 5th – 0.00	(United States) GCT St. Louis 9th – 0.00	(United States) Sinquefield Cup T 3rd-4th – 8.67	(FIDE) Total Chess 2026 Pilot 15th – 0.00	Optional			
8	(Armenia) Haik M. Martirosyan	39.39	7	(Russia) Aeroflot Open 4th – 5.14	(Uzbekistan) Tashkent Open 1st – 8.19	(FIDE) European Individual Championship T 9th-23rd – 0.53	(Italy) Sardinia 2nd – 10.34	(France) Dole Open 2nd – 12.53	(Poland) Rubinstein Memorial T 3rd-4th – 2.66	(FIDE) Total Chess 2026 Pilot 9th – 0.00	Required	Optional			
9	(Netherlands) Anish Giri	37.59	7	(Netherlands) Tata Steel (M) T 8th-10th – 0.00	(FIDE) Candidates 2nd – 19.94	GCT Romania T 5th-9th – 0.00	GCT Croatia 7th – 0.00	(United States) GCT St. Louis 8th – 0.00	(United States) Sinquefield Cup 9th – 0.00	(FIDE) Total Chess 2026 Pilot 2nd - 17.65	Required	Optional			
10	(United States) Hans Niemann	37.40	7	(Netherlands) Tata Steel (M) T 3rd-5th – 14.06	(Czech Republic) Prague (M) T 7th-8th – 0.00	GCT Poland 1st – 12.96	(Uzbekistan) UzChess Cup (M) T 7th-8th – 0.00	(India) Chennai Grand Masters 7th – 0.00	(United States) U.S. Championship T 10th-11th – 0.00	(FIDE) Total Chess 2026 Pilot 5th - 10.38	Required	Optional			
11	(India) Arjun Erigaisi	36.34	5	(Netherlands) Tata Steel (M) T 12th-13th – 0.00	(Sweden) TePe Sigeman 2nd – 17.61	(Uzbekistan) UzChess Cup (M) T 4th-5th – 2.31	(India) Chennai Grand Masters 3rd – 16.42	(FIDE) Total Chess 2026 Pilot 10th – 0.00	Required			Optional			
12	(FIDE) Ian Nepomniachtchi	32.48	5	(Russia) Aeroflot Open 1st – 13.57	(Italy) Sardinia 3rd – 9.65	(Uzbekistan) UzChess Cup (M) 3rd – 9.26	(France) Dole Open T 21st-43rd – 0.00	(FIDE) Total Chess 2026 Pilot 7th – 0.00	Required			Optional			
13	(United States) Andrew Hong	30.03	9	(United States) St. Louis Masters T 4th-8th – 4.10	(Germany) Grenke Open 4th – 3.39	(Spain) Menorca Open 64th – 0.00	(Kazakhstan) Aktobe Open 1st – 12.56	(United States) Naroditsky Memorial – Rapid T 3rd-6th – 6.54	(United States) Naroditsky Memorial – Blitz T 14th-19th – 0.00	(France) Dole Open T 9th-20th – 0.00	(Germany) Dortmund T 84th-93rd – 0.00	(Hungary) Kanizsa Open 5th – 3.44	(FIDE) Total Chess 2026 Pilot 19th – 0.00	Optional	
14	(Netherlands) Jorden van Foreest	24.58	8	(Netherlands) Tata Steel (M) T 3rd-5th – 14.06	(Czech Republic) Prague (M) T 2nd-4th – 10.52	(Sweden) TePe Sigeman 5th – 0.00	GCT Romania T 5th-9th – 0.00	GCT Croatia 9th – 0.00	(United States) GCT St. Louis T 5th-7th – 0.00	(United States) Sinquefield Cup 10th – 0.00	(FIDE) Total Chess 2026 Pilot 12th – 0.00	Optional			
15	(FIDE) Andrey Esipenko	22.85	5	(Russia) Aeroflot Open T 9th-16th – 1.44	(FIDE) Candidates 8th – 0.00	(Kazakhstan) Aktobe Open 7th – 2.35	(Kazakhstan) Oskemen Open 1st – 10.65	(Russia) Russian Championship; 1st – 8.41	Required			Optional			
16	(Uzbekistan) Mukhiddin Madaminov	22.23	4	(Uzbekistan) Al-Beruniy Masters T 8th-9th – 0.00	(Uzbekistan) UzChess Cup (M) 1st – 18.85	(United States) Naroditsky Memorial – Rapid T 54th-72nd – 0.00	(United States) Naroditsky Memorial – Blitz 6th – 3.38	Required				Optional			
17	(United States) Abhimanyu Mishra	22.17	6	(United States) St. Louis Masters T 9th-18th – 0.00	(Spain) Alicante 2nd – 5.19	(Spain) Menorca Open 1st – 8.02	(Slovakia) Chess Slovak Open T 1st-2nd – 8.96	(United States) U.S. Championship T 6th-8th – 0.00	(FIDE) Total Chess 2026 Pilot 22nd – 0.00	Required		Optional			
18	(FIDE) Daniil Dubov	21.81	5	(Russia) Aeroflot Open T 23rd-46th – 0.00	(Azerbaijan) Baku Open 5th – 2.88	(Kazakhstan) Aktobe Open 3rd – 7.71	(United Arab Emirates) Abu Dhabi Masters 2nd – 5.37	(Kazakhstan) KazChess Masters 2nd – 5.85	Required			Optional			
19	(India) Nihal Sarin	21.81	3	(Spain) Menorca Masters 1st – 13.51	(Armenia) Stepan Avagyan Memorial 3rd – 8.25	(India) Chennai Grand Masters T 4th-6th – 0.00	Required					Optional			
20	(Uzbekistan) Shamsiddin Vokhidov	20.70	5	(Uzbekistan) Al-Beruniy Masters T 6th-7th – 0.00	(Russia) Karpov International T 4th-7th – 0.00	(Uzbekistan) UzChess Cup (M) 2nd – 16.86	(Kazakhstan) Atyrau Open T 22nd-32nd – 0.00	(Kazakhstan) KazChess Masters 3rd – 3.84	Required			Optional			
21	(India) Aravindh Chithambaram	20.63	5	(Netherlands) Tata Steel (M) T 12th-13th – 0.00	(Czech Republic) Prague (M) T 2nd-4th – 10.52	(Armenia) Stepan Avagyan Memorial T 9th-10th – 0.00	(United States) Naroditsky Memorial – Rapid 2nd – 10.11	(United States) Naroditsky Memorial – Blitz T 14th-19th – 0.00	Required			Optional			
22	(Germany) Frederik Svane	20.59	2	(Italy) Sardinia 1st – 15.16	(Germany) Bavarian Chess Championship 2nd – 5.43	Required						Optional			
23	(Norway) Magnus Carlsen	19.68	3	(Sweden) TePe Sigeman 1st – 19.68	Norway Chess 4th – 0.00	(FIDE) Total Chess 2026 Pilot 17th – 0.00	Required					Optional			
24	(Azerbaijan) Mahammad Muradli	19.61	4	(Russia) Aeroflot Open T 9th-16th – 1.44	(FIDE) European Individual Championship 4th – 9.37	(Uzbekistan) UzChess Cup (Ch) 1st – 8.80	(Kazakhstan) KazChess Masters 8th – 0.00	Required				Optional			
25	(United States) Andy Woodward	19.06	6	(Netherlands) Tata Steel (Ch) 1st – 7.46	(United States) St. Louis Masters T 9th-18th – 0.00	(Sweden) TePe Sigeman 6th – 0.00	(United States) Naroditsky Memorial – Rapid T 3rd-6th – 6.54	(United States) Naroditsky Memorial – Blitz 4th – 5.06	(United States) U.S. Championship 5th – 0.00	Required		Optional			
26	(Armenia) Aram Hakobyan	18.86	5	(Uzbekistan) Al-Beruniy Masters 1st – 11.22	(Russia) Aeroflot Open T 9th-16th – 1.44	(Russia) Karpov International 3rd – 6.20	(Armenia) Stepan Avagyan Memorial T 5th-6th – 0.00	(Kazakhstan) KazChess Masters T 5th-7th – 0.00	Required			Optional			
27	(FIDE) David Paravyan	18.51	4	(Russia) Aeroflot Open 2nd – 6.38	(FIDE) Asian Individual Championship T 25th-38th – 0.00	(Kazakhstan) Aktobe Open 3rd – 6.78	(Russia) Russian Championship; 3rd – 5.35	Required				Optional			
28	(Belarus) Denis Lazavik	17.78	2	(Russia) Karpov International 1st – 9.74	(Kazakhstan) KazChess Masters 1st – 8.04	Required						Optional			
29	(FIDE) Dmitry Andreikin	17.55	1	(India) Chennai Grand Masters 2nd – 17.55	Required							Optional			
30	(Iran) Amin Tabatabaei	17.06	2	(Iceland) Reykjavik Open 1st – 10.79	(France) Dole Open 6th – 6.27	Required						Optional			
31	(United States) Samuel Sevian	17.03	5	(Armenia) Stepan Avagyan Memorial 1st – 14.92	(United States) Naroditsky Memorial – Rapid T 17th-26th – 0.00	(United States) Naroditsky Memorial – Blitz T 7th-8th – 2.11	(United States) Sinquefield Cup T 5th-8th – 0.00	(United States) U.S. Championship 12th – 0.00	Required			Optional			
32	(United States) Hikaru Nakamura	16.68	2	(FIDE) Candidates 5th – 12.46	(United States) Naroditsky Memorial – Blitz 5th – 4.22	Required						Optional			
33	(France) Maxime Vachier-Lagrave	16.36	2	GCT Croatia T 3rd-4th – 3.90	(FIDE) Total Chess 2026 Pilot 4th - 12.46	Required						Optional			
34	(Ukraine) Ruslan Ponomariov	15.93	4	(Spain) Menorca Masters 2nd – 7.37	(Azerbaijan) Baku Open 8th – 2.02	(United States) Naroditsky Memorial – Rapid T 3rd-6th – 6.54	(United States) Naroditsky Memorial – Blitz T 14th-19th – 0.00	Required				Optional			
35	(Ukraine) Roman Dehtiarov	15.85	1	(FIDE) European Individual Championship 1st – 15.85	Required							Optional			
36	(India) Aditya Mittal	15.64	6	(Italy) Sardinia T 16th-25th – 0.00	(FIDE) Asian Individual Championship T 9th-24th – 0.00	(Uzbekistan) UzChess Cup (Ch) 2nd – 6.40	(Kazakhstan) Oskemen Open T 11th-23rd – 0.00	(Slovakia) Chess Slovak Open T 1st-2nd – 8.96	(Kazakhstan) Atyrau Open T 9th-21st – 0.28	Required		Optional			
37	(Ukraine) Vasyl Ivanchuk	15.63	6	(Netherlands) Tata Steel (Ch) 2nd – 5.43	(Iceland) Reykjavik Open 3rd – 5.33	(Spain) Alicante 3rd – 4.87	(FIDE) European Individual Championship T 24th-50th – 0.00	(United States) Naroditsky Memorial – Rapid T 27th-39th – 0.00	(United States) Naroditsky Memorial – Blitz T 14th-19th – 0.00	Required		Optional			
38	(United States) Awonder Liang	15.60	4	(United States) Naroditsky Memorial – Rapid T 17th-26th – 0.00	(United States) Naroditsky Memorial – Blitz T 20th-30th – 0.00	(Poland) Rubinstein Memorial 1st – 15.60	(United States) U.S. Championship T 6th-8th – 0.00	Required				Optional			
39	(India) Leon Luke Mendonca	15.59	5	(Spain) Menorca Open 2nd – 7.11	(Italy) Sardinia T 48th-66th – 0.00	(France) Dole Open 3rd – 8.48	(Slovakia) Chess Slovak Open 5th – 0.00	(Kazakhstan) Atyrau Open T 22nd-32nd – 0.00	Required			Optional			
40	(Azerbaijan) Aydin Suleymanli	15.50	4	(Netherlands) Tata Steel (Ch) 3rd – 4.75	(FIDE) European Individual Championship 3rd – 10.09	(United States) Naroditsky Memorial – Rapid T 7th-15th – 0.66	(United States) Naroditsky Memorial – Blitz T 20th-30th – 0.00	Required				Optional			
41	(China) Wei Yi	14.96	1	(FIDE) Candidates 4th – 14.96	Required							Optional			
42	(Armenia) Robert Hovhannisyan	14.53	2	(FIDE) European Individual Championship T 9th-23rd – 0.53	(France) Dole Open 1st – 14.00	Required						Optional			
43	(Belgium) Daniel Dardha	14.11	4	(Italy) Sardinia T 26th-47th – 0.00	(FIDE) European Individual Championship T 9th-23rd – 0.53	(Italy) Spilimbergo 1st – 5.65	(Slovakia) Chess Slovak Open 3rd – 7.93	Required				Optional			
44	(Uzbekistan) Mukhammadzokhid Suyarov	13.61	7	(Russia) Aeroflot Open 7th – 3.29	(Uzbekistan) Tashkent Open 6th – 3.66	(Germany) Grenke Open 1st – 6.66	(Italy) Sardinia T 26th-47th – 0.00	(Uzbekistan) UzChess Cup (Ch) T 4th-6th – 0.00	(France) Dole Open T 21st-43rd – 0.00	(United Arab Emirates) Abu Dhabi Masters T 32nd-43rd – 0.00	Required	Optional			
45	(FIDE) Vladislav Artemiev	13.35	2	(Armenia) Stepan Avagyan Memorial 2nd – 13.35	(FIDE) Total Chess 2026 Pilot 18th – 0.00	Required						Optional			
46	(United States) Grigoriy Oparin	12.81	4	(United States) St. Louis Masters T 19th-30th – 0.00	(United States) Naroditsky Memorial – Rapid T 7th-15th – 0.66	(United States) Naroditsky Memorial – Blitz T 20th-30th – 0.00	(United States) U.S. Championship T 3rd-4th – 12.15	Required				Optional			
47	(United States) Jeffery Xiong	12.15	1	(United States) U.S. Championship T 3rd-4th – 12.15	Required							Optional			
48	(Kazakhstan) Daniyal Sapenov	12.11	2	(Kazakhstan) Oskemen Open 2nd – 8.28	(United Arab Emirates) Abu Dhabi Masters; 6th – 3.83	Required						Optional			
49	(China) Xiao Tong	11.95	3	(Iceland) Reykjavik Open 7th – 3.36	(Spain) Menorca Open T 12th-28th – 0.00	(FIDE) Asian Individual Championship 2nd – 8.59	Required					Optional			
50	(Iran) Parham Maghsoodloo	11.48	3	(Czech Republic) Prague (M) T 2nd-4th – 10.52	(Italy) Sardinia T 9th-14th – 0.96	(France) Dole Open T 21st-43rd – 0.00	Required					Optional			

=== 2026 FIDE Open Circuit Standings ===
The top three finishers in the Open Circuit as of September 1, 2026 qualified for the Pilot tournament of Total Chess World Championship Tour, and the top two finishers as of January 1, 2027 will qualify for first leg of the full tour.

- : Qualified for Pilot tournament (Next top leader(s) if any current top player(s) has/have already qualified through other route(s).)
- : Player(s) qualified for Pilot tournament via another path.

Top 20 Standings as of 8 November 2026
No.	Player	Points	Events	1	2	3	4	5	6	7	8	9	10	11	12
1	(Armenia) Haik M. Martirosyan	36.73	5	(Russia) Aeroflot Open 4th – 5.14	(Uzbekistan) Tashkent Open 1st – 8.19	(FIDE) European Individual Championship T 9th-23rd – 0.53	(Italy) Sardinia 2nd – 10.34	(France) Dole Open 2nd – 12.53							
2	(United States) Andrew Hong	30.03	8	(United States) St. Louis Masters T 4th-8th – 4.10	(Germany) Grenke Open 4th – 3.39	(Spain) Menorca Open 64th – 0.00	(Kazakhstan) Aktobe Open 1st – 12.56	(United States) Naroditsky Memorial – Rapid T 3rd-6th – 6.54	(United States) Naroditsky Memorial – Blitz T 14th-19th – 0.00	(France) Dole Open T 9th-20th – 0.00	(Hungary) Kanizsa Open 5th – 3.44				
3	(FIDE) Ian Nepomniachtchi	23.22	3	(Russia) Aeroflot Open 1st – 13.57	(Italy) Sardinia 3rd – 9.65	(France) Dole Open T 21st-43rd – 0.00									
4	(Germany) Frederik Svane	20.59	2	(Italy) Sardinia 1st – 15.16	(Germany) Bavarian Chess Championship 2nd – 5.43										
5	(Uzbekistan) Javokhir Sindarov	20.58	2	(United States) Naroditsky Memorial – Rapid 1st – 11.30	(United States) Naroditsky Memorial – Blitz 1st – 9.28										
6	(Iran) Amin Tabatabaei	17.06	2	(Iceland) Reykjavik Open 1st – 10.79	(France) Dole Open 6th – 6.27										
7	(FIDE) Daniil Dubov	15.96	4	(Russia) Aeroflot Open T 23rd-46th – 0.00	(Azerbaijan) Baku Open 5th – 2.88	(Kazakhstan) Aktobe Open 3rd – 7.71	(United Arab Emirates) Abu Dhabi Masters 2nd – 5.37								
8	(Ukraine) Roman Dehtiarov	15.85	1	(FIDE) European Individual Championship 1st – 15.85											
9	(India) Leon Luke Mendonca	15.59	4	(Spain) Menorca Open 2nd – 7.11	(Italy) Sardinia T 48th-66th – 0.00	(France) Dole Open 3rd – 8.48	(Kazakhstan) Atyrau Open T 22nd-32nd – 0.00								
10	(Armenia) Robert Hovhannisyan	14.53	2	(FIDE) European Individual Championship T 9th-23rd – 0.53	(France) Dole Open 1st – 14.00										
11	(FIDE) Andrey Esipenko	14.44	3	(Russia) Aeroflot Open T 9th-16th – 1.44	(Kazakhstan) Aktobe Open 7th – 2.35	(Kazakhstan) Oskemen Open 1st – 10.65									
12	(Uzbekistan) Mukhammadzokhid Suyarov	13.61	6	(Russia) Aeroflot Open 7th – 3.29	(Uzbekistan) Tashkent Open 6th – 3.66	(Germany) Grenke Open 1st – 6.66	(Italy) Sardinia T 26th-46th – 0.00	(France) Dole Open T 21st-43rd – 0.00	(United Arab Emirates) Abu Dhabi Masters T 32nd-43rd – 0.00						
13	(United States) Abhimanyu Mishra	13.21	3	(United States) St. Louis Masters T 9th-18th – 0.00	(Spain) Alicante 2nd – 5.19	(Spain) Menorca Open 1st – 8.02									
14	(FIDE) David Paravyan	13.16	3	(Russia) Aeroflot Open 2nd – 6.38	(FIDE) Asian Individual Championship T 25th-38th – 0.00	(Kazakhstan) Oskemen Open 3rd – 6.78									
15	(Kazakhstan) Daniyal Sapenov	12.11	2	(Kazakhstan) Oskemen Open 2nd – 8.28	(United Arab Emirates) Abu Dhabi Masters 6th – 3.83										
16	(China) Xiao Tong	11.95	3	(Iceland) Reykjavik Open 7th – 3.36	(Spain) Menorca Open T 12th-28th – 0.00	(FIDE) Asian Individual Championship 2nd – 8.59									
17	(United States) Andy Woodward	11.60	3	(United States) St. Louis Masters T 9th-18th – 0.00	(United States) Naroditsky Memorial – Rapid T 3rd-6th – 6.54	(United States) Naroditsky Memorial – Blitz 4th – 5.06									
18	(United States) Mikhail Antipov	11.28	1	(United States) St. Louis Masters 1st – 11.28											
19	(FIDE) Rudik Makarian	10.95	4	(Russia) Aeroflot Open 3rd – 5.76	(Kazakhstan) Aktobe Open T 24th-34th – 0.00	(FIDE) Asian Rapid Championship T 9th-11th – 0.59	(United Arab Emirates) Abu Dhabi Masters 4th – 4.60	(Kazakhstan) Atyrau Open T 33rd-45th – 0.00							
20	(Norway) Elham Amar	10.90	8	(Iceland) Reykjavik Open T 28th-59th – 0.00	(Germany) Grenke Open 9th – 1.21	(FIDE) European Individual Championship T 9th-23rd – 0.53	(Italy) Sardinia T 48th-66th – 0.00	(Kazakhstan) Aktobe Open T 35th-48th – 0.00	(France) Dole Open T 9th-20th – 0.00	(Germany) Dortmund-Sparkassen 1st – 7.44	(Germany) Bavarian Chess Championship 7th – 1.72				
