= Chess World Cup 2027 =

International chess tournament

FIDE Chess World Cup 2027
Tournament information
- Sport: Chess
- Administrator: FIDE
- Tournament format: Hybrid (Group-swiss cum knockout)
- Host: TBD
- Participants: 224
- Defending champions: Javokhir Sindarov

The Chess World Cup 2027, officially the FIDE World Cup 2027, will be a 224-player multi-stage chess tournament organised by the International Chess Federation that is expected to take place in the fourth quarter of 2027. It will be the 12th edition of the Chess World Cup. Javokhir Sindarov, the winner of the Chess World Cup 2025 will defend his title against the top players across the globe. The winner and runner-up of the Chess World Cup 2027 will earn the right to play in the Candidates Tournament 2028.

== Format ==
Contrary to the each of the previous 11 World Cups organised by FIDE that took place in a fully knockout format, the 12th Chess World Cup will be a multi-stage event in which the first stage will be a group event based on swiss format, whereas the second stage will be based on knockout format. The changes in format were made on the recommendations of the FIDE Global Strategy Commission and was announced by FIDE via a press release on July 13, 2026.

=== Stage 1 ===
In the first stage, the 224 players shall be divided into 4 distinct pools of 56 players each (Pools A, B, C and D respectively) and of approximately the same strength via serpentine system, where the players are seeded based on the latest FIDE rating list as on the day of opening ceremony. Each pool shall play a 9 round swiss tournament. Similar to the fast classical time format in Total Chess World Championship, 45 minutes are allotted to each player and an increment of 30 seconds is given to each player per move. 2 rounds shall be played each day after the opening ceremony, at 2 pm and 6 pm local time respectively, except the third day of stage 1, on which only one round (at 2 pm) shall be played. Top 4 players after the 9th round from each pool advance to the knockout stage.

=== Stage 2 ===
In this stage, the 16 players who advanced to the knockout stage shall be paired as shown below. Each round shall have 2 games played 1 game each day in classical time format, in which 90 minutes are given to each player initially, 30 minutes are added at the 40th move and 30 seconds are added each move each player from the first move. 1 Point is granted for each victory hand 0.5 points for each draw. The player who scores 1.5 or 2 points (i.e. more points then their opponent) advances to the next round). If both players score 1 point after the two games, tie-breakers are applied as explained below.

1/8th Finals
Pool A Winner
Pool B Place 4
Pool D Place 3
Pool C Place 2
Pool B Place 2
Pool A Place 3
Pool C Place 4
Pool D Winner
Pool B Winner
Pool A Place 4
Pool C Place 3
Pool D Place 2
Pool A Place 2
Pool B Place 3
Pool D Place 4
Pool C Winner

Quarterfinals

Semifinals

Finals
Third Place

==== Tie-breakers ====
1. A round of 2 rapid games of time format 15 minutes each player + 10 seconds of increment each move.
2. A round of 2 blitz games of time format 5 minutes each player + 3 seconds of increment each move.
3. A round of 2 blitz games of time format 3 minutes each player + 2 seconds of increment each move.
4. A sudden death game: Both players bid for lowest time (less than 4 minutes) with black with a two second increment, the one who loses the bid gets white with 4 minutes of game and 2 seconds of increment. Winner of the game advances to the next round. If the game ends in a draw, the player who played black advances to the next round.

== Qualification ==
The following players qualify for the Chess World Cup via the spots mentioned next to their names.

1. Semifinalists of the 2025 Chess World Cup: (Uzbekistan) Javokhir Sindarov (winner), (China) Wei Yi (runner-up), (FIDE) Andrey Esipenko (third place) and (Uzbekistan) Nodirbek Yakubboev (fourth place)
2. World Chess Champion: To be decided
3. World Junior (U20) Chess Champion: To be decided
4. World Senior (O50) Chess Champion: To be decided
5. Winner of Total Chess World Championship 2026: To be decided
6. Women's World Chess Champion: To be decided
7. FIDE Grand Swiss 2027: Top 4 finishers; To be decided
8. Continental Events: To be decided by the continent's chess federation (Distribution of qualification spots - 7 to Africa, 14 to Americas, 31 to Europe and 39 to Asia)
9. FIDE Circuit 2026-2027: Top 6 unqualified players as on 1 June 2027; To be decided
10. July 2027 FIDE Rating List: Top 8 unqualified players who have been active in the last 7 rating lists (ties broken by total number of rated games in last 7 rating lists, if tie persists, then drawing of lots take place); To be decided
11. 46th Chess Olympiad: Top 100 federations (no more than 1 team per federation, no more than 40 federations per continent); Continental federations were allowed to transfer upto 50% spots into continental championships, where Africa, Americas and Europe transferred 3, 4 and 10 spots respectively. The federation is allowed to nominate any player from its Olympiad team or any other player representing the federation only if all members of its Olympiad team are already qualified. This FIDE press release lists all qualifying federations.
12. Nomination by FIDE President: Timur Turlov, the incumbent FIDE President will nominate 4 players for the World Cup.
13. Nomination by organiser: The organiser nominates 2 players for the World Cup.

=== Replacements ===
- For Path 1, 2, and 10 as listed above, the replacement shall be next highest rated players eligible to qualify by path 10.
- For Path 6, the replacement shall be the highest rated unqualified female player. If the last person declines, the replacement as per Path 10 shall be used.
- For Paths 3, 4, 5, 7 and 8, the next ranked player in the respective tournament replace the previous ones. For Zonal Tournaments, a replacement player shall have scored at least 50% of the maximum possible score. Otherwise, the vacant spot(s) shall be allocated to the next respective Continental Championship. If there is no further Continental Championship in the current cycle, the spot(s) shall be allocated to the last respective Continental Championship.

=== FIDE Circuit Leaderboard ===
: Current leaders – set to qualify for 2027 World Cup (Next top leader if the current top player has already qualified through another route)

: Player qualified for 2027 World Cup via another path

Top 10 Standings as of 22 October 2026
| No. | Player | Points | Events | 1 | 2 | 3 | 4 | 5 | 6 | 7 | 8 | 9 | 10 | 11 | 12 |
|---|---|---|---|---|---|---|---|---|---|---|---|---|---|---|---|
| 1 | (Uzbekistan) Javokhir Sindarov | 93.89 | 8 | (Netherlands) Tata Steel (M) 2nd – 18.75 | (FIDE) Candidates 1st – 27.42 | GCT Poland T 7th-9th – 0.00 | GCT Romania T 3rd-4th – 8.53 | (United States) Naroditsky Memorial – Rapid 1st – 11.30 | (United States) Naroditsky Memorial – Blitz 1st – 9.28 | (United States) GCT St. Louis 2nd – 9.94 | (United States) Sinquefield Cup T 3rd-4th – 8.67 | Optional | | | |
| 2 | (United States) Wesley So | 93.11 | 8 | GCT Poland 3rd – 8.25 | GCT Romania T 3rd-4th – 8.53 | Norway Chess 2nd – 18.92 | (United States) Naroditsky Memorial – Rapid T 7th-15th – 0.66 | (United States) Naroditsky Memorial – Blitz 2nd – 6.75 | (United States) GCT St. Louis 3rd – 8.70 | (United States) Sinquefield Cup 1st – 23.54 | (United States) U.S. Championship 1st – 17.76 | Optional | | | |
| 3 | (United States) Fabiano Caruana | 70.47 | 9 | (United States) St. Louis Masters 2nd – 8.20 | (FIDE) Candidates 3rd – 17.45 | GCT Poland 2nd – 9.43 | GCT Romania 2nd – 19.50 | (United States) Naroditsky Memorial – Rapid T 17th-26th – 0.00 | (United States) Naroditsky Memorial – Blitz T 20th-30th – 0.00 | (United States) GCT St. Louis T 5th-7th – 0.00 | (United States) Sinquefield Cup T 5th-8th – 0.00 | (United States) U.S. Championship 2nd – 15.89 | Optional | | |
| 4 | (Uzbekistan) Nodirbek Abdusattorov | 65.64 | 6 | (Netherlands) Tata Steel (M) 1st – 25.78 | (Czech Republic) Prague (M) 1st – 23.14 | (Sweden) TePe Sigeman T 3rd-4th – 7.25 | (Uzbekistan) UzChess Cup (M) 6th – 0.00 | GCT Croatia 2nd – 9.47 | (India) Chennai Grand Masters T 4th-6th – 0.00 | Optional | | | | | |
| 5 | (India) R Praggnanandhaa | 64.65 | 7 | (Netherlands) Tata Steel (M) T 12th-13th – 0.00 | (FIDE) Candidates 7th – 0.00 | GCT Romania T 5th-9th – 0.00 | Norway Chess 1st – 26.02 | GCT Croatia T 3rd-4th – 3.90 | (United States) GCT St. Louis 1st - 13.67 | (United States) Sinquefield Cup 2nd – 21.06 | Optional | | | | |
| 6 | (Germany) Vincent Keymer | 49.55 | 7 | (Netherlands) Tata Steel (M) T 3rd-5th – 14.06 | (Czech Republic) Prague (M) T 7th-8th – 0.00 | GCT Romania 1st – 26.82 | Norway Chess 5th – 0.00 | GCT Croatia 5th – 0.00 | (United States) GCT St. Louis 9th – 0.00 | (United States) Sinquefield Cup T 3rd-4th – 8.67 | Optional | | | | |
| 7 | (Armenia) Haik M. Martirosyan | 39.39 | 6 | (Russia) Aeroflot Open 4th – 5.14 | (Uzbekistan) Tashkent Open 1st – 8.19 | (FIDE) European Individual Championship T 9th-23rd – 0.53 | (Italy) Sardinia 2nd – 10.34 | (France) Dole Open 2nd – 12.53 | (Poland) Rubinstein Memorial T 3rd-4th – 2.66 | Optional | | | | | |
| 8 | (India) Arjun Erigaisi | 36.34 | 4 | (Netherlands) Tata Steel (M) T 12th-13th – 0.00 | (Sweden) TePe Sigeman 2nd – 17.61 | (Uzbekistan) UzChess Cup (M) T 4th-5th – 2.31 | (India) Chennai Grand Masters 3rd – 16.42 | Optional | | | | | | | |
| 9 | (France) Alireza Firouzja | 35.50 | 4 | GCT Poland 5th – 0.00 | Norway Chess 3rd – 0.00 | GCT Croatia 1st – 10.58 | (India) Chennai Grand Masters 1st – 24.92 | Optional | | | | | | | |
| 10 | (FIDE) Ian Nepomniachtchi | 32.48 | 4 | (Russia) Aeroflot Open 1st – 13.57 | (Italy) Sardinia 3rd – 9.65 | (Uzbekistan) UzChess Cup (M) 3rd – 9.26 | (France) Dole Open T 21st-43rd – 0.00 | Optional | | | | | | | |

=== 46th Chess Olympiad spots ===
Spots reserved for continental events
| Continent | Continental Chess Federation | Number of spots reserved |
|---|---|---|
| Europe | European Chess Union | 10 |
| Americas | Confederation of Chess for the Americas | 4 |
| Africa | African Chess Confederation | 3 |

Spots by Chess Federation
| Rank | Federation | Note |
|---|---|---|
| 1 | Uzbekistan | 2 players from the main team (Board 2: Javokhir Sindarov and Board 3: Nodirbek Yakubboev) have already qualified. The team must pick one of the remaining players (Board 1: Nodirbek Abdusattorov, Board 4: Shamsiddin Vokhidov or Reserve: Mukhiddin Madaminov, as of now) unless all of them qualify via other paths. |
| 2 | India | |
| 3 | Germany | |
| 4 | United States | |
| 5 | Azerbaijan | |
| 6 | Armenia | |
| 7 | Hungary | |
| 8 | China | 1 team member from the team (Board 2: Wei Yi) has already qualified. The team must pick one of the remaining players (Board 1: Ding Liren, Board 3: Yu Yangyi, Board 4: Xu Xiangyu or Reserve: Kong Xiangrui, as of now) unless all of them qualify via other paths. |
| 9 | France | |
| 10 | Spain | |
| 11 | Ukraine | |
| 12 | England | |
| 13 | Turkey | |
| 14 | Poland | |
| 15 | Iran | |
| 16 | Netherlands | |
| 17 | Romania | |
| 19 | Vietnam | |
| 20 | Croatia | |
| 21 | Czech Republic | |
| 22 | Serbia | |
| 23 | Argentina | |
| 24 | Israel | |
| 25 | Kazakhstan | |
| 26 | Mongolia | |
| 27 | Belarus | |
| 28 | Georgia | |
| 29 | Italy | |
| 30 | Greece | |
| 31 | Slovenia | |
| 32 | Philippines | |
| 33 | Peru | |
| 34 | Bulgaria | |
| 35 | Indonesia | |
| 36 | North Macedonia | |
| 37 | Singapore | |
| 38 | Moldova | |
| 39 | Denmark | |
| 40 | Belgium | |
| 41 | Chile | |
| 42 | Canada | |
| 43 | Portugal | |
| 44 | Brazil | |
| 45 | Montenegro | |
| 46 | Switzerland | |
| 47 | Latvia | |
| 52 | Colombia | |
| 53 | Cuba | |
| 55 | Tajikistan | |
| 56 | Australia | |
| 59 | New Zealand | |
| 62 | Kyrgyzstan | |
| 63 | Ecuador | |
| 64 | Turkmenistan | |
| 67 | Bangladesh | |
| 68 | Uruguay | |
| 69 | Lebanon | |
| 70 | South Korea | |
| 71 | Chinese Taipei | |
| 72 | Costa Rica | |
| 75 | Bolivia | |
| 76 | Mexico | |
| 77 | Paraguay | |
| 78 | Malaysia | |
| 79 | Hong Kong | |
| 80 | Algeria | |
| 81 | Angola | |
| 82 | South Africa | |
| 83 | Jordan | |
| 84 | Sri Lanka | |
| 85 | United Arab Emirates | |
| 87 | Madagascar | |
| 89 | Syria | |
| 90 | Libya | |
| 91 | Uganda | |
| 92 | Japan | |
| 93 | Mozambique | |
| 94 | Tunisia | |
| 95 | Pakistan | |
| 98 | Thailand | |
| 101 | Myanmar | |
| 107 | Nepal | |
| 108 | Oman | |

== Participants ==
The following players qualified are mentioned in order of their most recent FIDE Ratings.

| Current rank | Player | Federation | Qualification path | (November 2026) | |
| Current rank | Player | Federation | Qualification path | FIDE Rating | World Rank |
|---|---|---|---|---|---|
| 1 | GM Javokhir Sindarov | Uzbekistan | 1 | 2782 | 4 |
| 2 | GM Wei Yi | China | 1 | 2761 | 8 |
| 3 | GM Nodirbek Yakubboev | Uzbekistan | 1 | 2701 | 31 |
| 4 | GM Andrey Esipenko | FIDE | 1 | 2683 | 41 |

== Prize fund ==
The tournament has a total prize fund of US$2,300,000, out of which a total of US$160,000 is awarded to those 208 who only participated in pool stage (US$40,000 each pool) and a total of US$70,000 is awarded to those 16 players who advanced to the second stage. The prize distribution for each stage is given below.

Stage 1 (per pool)
| Rank in pool | Prize in US$ (each player) |
|---|---|
| 5th | 23,000 |
| 6th | 20,000 |
| 7th | 18,000 |
| 8th | 16,000 |
| 9th | 15,000 |
| 10th | 14,000 |
| 11th-15th | 12,000 |
| 16th-20th | 10,000 |
| 21st-25th | 8,000 |
| 26th-30th | 6,000 |
| 31st-40th | 5,000 |
| 41st-56th | 4,000 |

Stage 2
| Place | Prize in US$ |
|---|---|
| Winner | 120,000 |
| Runner-up | 90,000 |
| Third place | 70,000 |
| Fourth place | 52,000 |
| 5th-8th (eliminated in quarterfinals) | 36,000 (each) |
| 9th-16th (eliminated in 1/8th finals) | 28,000 (each) |

== Schedule ==
Though the schedule of the event has not been declared yet, the following events will take place on the following days considering the day of arrivals the first day.

(TB refers to Tie-Breakers)

| Event/Round | | Day | Time |
|---|---|---|---|
| Arrivals | | Day 1 | - |
| Opening Ceremony | | Day 2 | TBD |
Stage 1 begins
| Round 1 | | Day 3 | 2 pm |
| Round 2 | | Day 3 | 6 pm |
| Round 3 | | Day 4 | 2 pm |
| Round 4 | | Day 4 | 6 pm |
| Round 5 | | Day 5 | 2 pm |
| Round 6 | | Day 6 | 2 pm |
| Round 7 | | Day 6 | 6 pm |
| Round 8 | | Day 7 | 2 pm |
| Round 9 | | Day 7 | 6 pm |
Stage 1 ends
| Rest day | | Day 8 | - |
Stage 2 begins
| 1/8th Finals (Round of 16) | Game 1 | Day 9 | 2 pm |
| 1/8th Finals (Round of 16) | Game 2 | Day 10 | 2 pm |
| 1/8th Finals (Round of 16) | TB | Day 11 | 2 pm |
| Quarterfinals (Round of 8) | Game 1 | Day 12 | 2 pm |
| Quarterfinals (Round of 8) | Game 2 | Day 13 | 2 pm |
| Quarterfinals (Round of 8) | TB | Day 14 | 2 pm |
| Rest day | | Day 15 | - |
| Semifinals | Game 1 | Day 16 | 2 pm |
| Semifinals | Game 2 | Day 17 | 2 pm |
| Semifinals | TB | Day 18 | 2 pm |
| Finals and Third place | Game 1 | Day 19 | 2 pm |
| Finals and Third place | Game 2 | Day 20 | 2 pm |
| Finals and Third place | TB | Day 21 | 2 pm |
| Closing Ceremony | | Day 21 | TBD |
Tournament ends
| Departures | | Day 22 | - |
