= Balaji Daggupati =

American chess grandmaster (born 2005)

Personal information
- Born: March 5, 2005 (age 21) Hayward, California, U.S.

Chess career
- Country: United States
- Title: Grandmaster (2022)
- FIDE rating: 2459 (July 2026)
- Peak rating: 2513 (March 2023)

Balaji Daggupati (born March 5, 2005) is an American chess grandmaster.

== Chess career ==
Daggupati began playing chess at the age of 5, gaining interest in the game since his sister played for elementary teams. He earned the National Master title at age 11, the FIDE Master title at age 12, and the International Master title at age 16. Throughout 2021, he earned all three Grandmaster norms. He later achieved the required rating to earn the title in 2022.

In September 2021, he participated in the Hou Yifan Challenge, though he was defeated by R Praggnanandhaa. He was later selected to be in the age 15 division of the 2022 All-America Chess Team.

In March 2022, he was amongst a few junior players who managed to significantly increase their Elo rating.

In July 2022, he finished third in the U.S. Junior Chess Championship, sharing the position with Abhimanyu Mishra. They finished behind winner Christopher Yoo and runner-up Andrew Hong.

== Personal life ==
Daggupati began studying computer science at the University of Texas at Dallas in September 2023, also playing for the school's chess team.
