= Candidates Tournament 2028 =

Chess tournament

The 2028 Candidates Tournament, officially known as FIDE Candidates Tournament 2028 will be an eight-player double round-robin chess tournament, held to determine the challenger for the World Chess Championship 2028. The event is expected to take place alongside the Women's Candidates Tournament 2028.

== Qualification ==
On 14 July 2026, FIDE announced the following qualification pathways.

Qualification method	Qualifier	Rating	World Ranking
Top two finishers of the Total Chess World Championship Tour 2026–2027	TBD		
Top two finishers of the Total Chess World Championship Tour 2026–2027	TBD		
Top two finishers of the FIDE Grand Swiss Tournament 2027	TBD		
Top two finishers of the FIDE Grand Swiss Tournament 2027	TBD		
Top two finishers of the Chess World Cup 2027	TBD		
Top two finishers of the Chess World Cup 2027	TBD		
Top two finishers of the 2026–2027 FIDE Circuit	TBD		
Top two finishers of the 2026–2027 FIDE Circuit	TBD		

=== Removal of FIDE rating spot ===
There shall be no spot for the highest rated unqualified player in the 2028 Candidates Tournament. FIDE CEO Emil Sutovsky announced in December 2025 that he would submit a proposal to eliminate the candidates spot for the highest rated unqualified player, one of the most controversial spots in the Candidates Tournament. The move, approved by FIDE Council in July 2026 now eliminated the spot.

=== FIDE Grand Swiss 2027 ===
Just like every Candidates tournament since 2020, top 2 players in FIDE Grand Swiss qualify for the candidates.

=== FIDE World Cup 2027 ===
The number of qualification spots in FIDE Chess World Cup have been reduced from 3 to include only the two finalists for the candidates. The reforms in the World Cup to include Fast Classical and Swiss tournament qualification for the final round does not impact the qualification spots and only the final (Knockout) stage is considered for qualification.

=== Total Chess World Championship Tour 2026–2027 ===
The combined results of Total Chess World Championship 2026 pilot event and each of the three events (Fast Classical, Rapid and Blitz) in 2027 shall be considered and top 2 players shall be given a spot to the candidates.

=== 2026–2027 FIDE Circuit ===
The formerly annual circuit including the top global chess tournaments of the year, started in 2023 has been expanded to two years. The qualification spots, as given one for each year has been changed to two spots for the combined two year circuit. Top 2 leaders unqualified for the candidates shall qualify for the Candidates Tournament 2028 provided they have played in at least 8 events eligible for FIDE Circuit points with no more than 6 classical tournaments with less than 50 players (though 7/8 such tournaments can be considered if the player has played in 11/more than 11 events respectively) and no more than 3 rapid and blitz events (though 4 such tournaments can be considered if the player has played in 11 or more events).
