= Byuravan =

Byuravan Բյուրավան
- Location within Armenia Location within Ararat
- Coordinates: 40°00′58″N 44°31′07″E
- Country: Armenia
- Province: Ararat
- Municipality: Artashat

Population (2011)
  - Total: 1,191
- Time zone: UTC+4
  - Summer (DST): UTC+5

Byuravan (Armenian: Բյուրավան) is a village in the Artashat Municipality of the Ararat Province of Armenia.

== History ==
In 1936-1967 the village was engaged in cotton making, hence the name of the village - Bambakavan. In 1978, on the initiative of Hovhannes Shiraz, the village was renamed Byuravan. Renovated with the help of the community with the support and now the completely destroyed St. Gregory the Illuminator Church is functioning. A memorial fountain was built in the center of the village in memory of 29 fellow villagers who died in the Great Patriotic War. The village is located on the right bank of the Azat River, in the Ararat valley.

== Notable people ==
- Haik M. Martirosyan, grandmaster and World Youth Chess champion
