= Total Chess World Championship Tour =

Series of chess tournaments from 2026

The Total Chess World Championship Tour 2026–2027, organized by Norway Chess and approved by FIDE, is an annual series of chess tournaments among top players combining the three time controls – fast classical, rapid, and blitz. It comprises four tournaments: one Pilot Tournament in 2026, two other tournaments and a Grand Final. Players are awarded points in each of the first three tournaments based on their rank in the tournament and highest rank-scorers qualify for the Grand Final. The winner of the tournament is crowned with the FIDE World Combined Champion title.

== 2026 Pilot Event ==
The first event of the Total Chess World Championship Tour 2026-2027 is being played from 10 November to 20 November, 2026 in Budapest, Hungary.

=== Format ===
The pilot tournament consists of two stages, group stage and knockout stage. A nine-round swiss-system blitz tournament will be played on day before the opening ceremony. The standings of this tournament will act as tie-breaker for the group stage. Time controls for each format of the tournament are as follows:

- Fast Classical – 45 minutes with 30-second increment per move starting from move 1.
- Rapid – 15 minutes with 10-second increment per move starting from move 1.
- Blitz – 3 minutes with 2-second increment per move starting from move 1.

==== Pre-Tournament Blitz ====
Nine rounds of blitz games in swiss format will be played to determine seeding of players in knockout format who scored same rank in group stage. Notation: "1 (B 12)" indicates a win (0 points) with black pieces (B) against the player who finished 12th (Jan-Krzysztof Duda). The first tiebreak (labeled BC) is the Buchholz. The second tiebreak (labeled Rp) is the Performance rating.

Rk.	Name	Elo	1	2	3	4	5	6	7	8	9	Total	BC	Rp
1	(Norway) Magnus Carlsen	2860	1 (B 12)	1 (W 7)	0.5 (B 2)	1 (W 6)	0.5 (B 9)	1 (W 10)	0.5 (B 5)	0.5 (W 3)	1 (B 13)	7	48	2924
2	(France) Maxime Vachier-Lagrave	2734	1 (W 20)	1 (B 11)	0.5 (W 1)	1 (B 9)	1 (W 16)	0 (B 6)	0.5 (W 8)	1 (B 4)	0.5 (W 5)	6.5	46	2897
3	(United States) Levon Aronian	2714	0.5 (B 18)	0.5 (W 22)	0 (B 10)	1 (W 15)	1 (W 11)	0.5 (B 4)	1 (W 16)	0.5 (B 1)	1 (B 6)	6	42.5	2847
4	(France) Alireza Firouzja	2797	0.5 (B 19)	0.5 (W 10)	0 (B 5)	1 (W 7)	1 (B 12)	0.5 (W 3)	1 (B 13)	0 (W 2)	1 (B 11)	5.5	46	2758
5	(United States) Hans Niemann	2711	0 (W 17)	1 (B 20)	1 (W 4)	0.5 (B 16)	0.5 (W 8)	1 (B 14)	0.5 (W 1)	0.5 (W 9)	0.5 (B 2)	5.5	45.5	2776
6	(India) Arjun Erigaisi	2766	1 (W 23)	1 (B 14)	0.5 (W 16)	0 (B 1)	1 (W 17)	1 (W 2)	0 (B 9)	1 (B 8)	0 (W 3)	5.5	45	2772
7	(Hungary) Richárd Rapport	2616	1 (W 8)	0 (B 1)	0.5 (W 14)	0 (B 4)	1 (W 21)	0.5 (B 17)	1 (W 18)	0.5 (B 15)	1 (W 16)	5.5	42.5	2744
8	(United States) Fabiano Caruana	2738	0 (B 7)	1 (W 24)	0.5 (B 12)	1 (W 13)	0.5 (B 5)	1 (W 11)	0.5 (B 2)	0 (W 6)	1 (B 9)	5.5	42	2750
9	(FIDE) Ian Nepomniachtchi	2765	0.5 (B 10)	1 (W 19)	1 (B 13)	0 (W 2)	0.5 (W 1)	0.5 (B 16)	1 (W 6)	0.5 (B 5)	0 (W 8)	5	47.5	2766
10	(Netherlands) Anish Giri	2636	0.5 (W 9)	0.5 (B 4)	1 (W 3)	0.5 (B 11)	0.5 (W 14)	0 (B 1)	0.5 (W 17)	0.5 (B 16)	1 (W 18)	5	44.5	2717
11	(Germany) Vincent Keymer	2628	1 (B 15)	0 (W 2)	1 (B 22)	0.5 (W 10)	0 (B 3)	0 (B 8)	1 (W 21)	1 (B 14)	0 (W 4)	4.5	43.5	2715
12	(Poland) Jan-Krzysztof Duda	2704	0 (W 1)	1 (B 21)	0.5 (W 8)	0.5 (B 17)	0 (W 4)	0 (B 18)	1 (W 20)	1 (B 22)	0.5 (W 15)	4.5	40	2666
13	(Armenia) Haik M. Martirosyan	2686	0.5 (B 22)	1 (W 18)	0 (W 9)	0 (B 8)	1 (W 20)	1 (B 23)	0 (W 4)	1 (B 17)	0 (W 1)	4.5	39.5	2682
14	(India) R Praggnanandhaa	2712	1 (B 24)	0 (W 6)	0.5 (B 14)	1 (W 19)	0.5 (B 10)	0 (W 5)	0.5 (B 15)	0 (W 11)	1 (B 21)	4.5	37.5	2648
15	(United States) Wesley So	2745	0 (W 11)	1 (B 23)	0 (W 17)	0 (B 3)	1 (W 24)	1 (B 20)	0.5 (W 14)	0.5 (W 7)	0.5 (B 12)	4.5	35.5	2602
16	(FIDE) Vladislav Artemiev	2712	1 (W 21)	1 (B 17)	0.5 (B 6)	0.5 (W 5)	0 (B 2)	0.5 (W 9)	0 (B 3)	0.5 (W 10)	0 (B 7)	4	46.5	2604
17	(India) Vaishali Rameshbabu	2345	1 (B 5)	0 (W 16)	1 (B 15)	0.5 (W 12)	0 (B 6)	0.5 (W 7)	0.5 (B 10)	0 (W 13)	0.5 (B 24)	4	39.5	2623
18	(United States) Abhimanyu Mishra	2541	0.5 (W 3)	0 (B 13)	0 (B 19)	0.5 (W 21)	1 (B 22)	1 (W 12)	0 (B 7)	1 (W 23)	0 (B 10)	4	38	2629
19	(Vietnam) Lê Quang Liêm	2675	0.5 (W 4)	0 (B 9)	1 (W 18)	0 (B 14)	0 (W 23)	0 (B 21)	1 (W 24)	0.5 (B 20)	1 (W 22)	4	31.5	2609
20	(Azerbaijan) Shakhriyar Mamedyarov	2612	0 (B 2)	0 (W 5)	1 (B 24)	1 (W 22)	0 (B 13)	0 (W 15)	0 (B 12)	0.5 (W 19)	1 (B 23)	3.5	35	2604
21	(United States) Andrew Hong	2537	0 (B 16)	0 (W 12)	1 (W 23)	0.5 (B 18)	0 (B 7)	1 (W 19)	0 (B 11)	1 (B 24)	0 (W 14)	3.5	34	2549
22	(Uzbekistan) Nodirbek Abdusattorov	2819	0.5 (W 13)	0.5 (B 3)	0 (W 11)	0 (B 20)	0 (W 18)	1 (B 24)	0.5 (W 23)	0 (W 12)	0 (B 19)	2.5	34	2461
23	(Netherlands) Jorden van Foreest	2659	0 (B 6)	0 (W 15)	0 (B 21)	1 (W 24)	1 (B 19)	0 (W 13)	0.5 (B 22)	0 (B 18)	0 (W 20)	2.5	32.5	2479
24	(Kazakhstan) Bibisara Assaubayeva	2424	0 (W 14)	0 (B 8)	0 (W 20)	0 (B 23)	0 (B 15)	0 (W 22)	0 (B 19)	0 (W 21)	0.5 (W 17)	0.5	34.5	2205

==== Group Stage ====
Four groups are made with 6 players each. The four highest rated players are placed in four different groups and remaining five players of each group will be determined by drawing of lots. The group stage will follow a double round robin format with fast classical time controls. Players will earn 3 points for a victory, 1 point for a draw, and 0 points for a loss. A tie in the rankings will be broken by the ranks in the pre-tournament Blitz Swiss.

The group stage has concluded. In each pair of cells, the first result is the game with White and the second the game with Black.

===== Group A =====
Rank	Player	Rating November 2026	FIR		DUD		JVF		ARO		HON		ABD		Total Points	TB	Qualification
1	(France) Alireza Firouzja	2757			1	1	3	1	1	1	3	0	3	1	15	#4	Advanced to Knockout 1
2	(Poland) Jan-Krzysztof Duda	2741	1	1			3	0	1	1	3	1	0	3	14	#12	Advanced to Knockout 2
3	(Netherlands) Jorden van Foreest	2715	1	0	3	0			0	3	0	3	3	1	14	#23	Advanced to Knockout 3
4	(United States) Levon Aronian	2719	1	1	1	1	0	3			1	1	1	1	11	#3	Advanced to Knockout 4
5	(United States) Andrew Hong	2609	3	0	1	0	0	3	1	1			1	1	11	#21	Advanced to Knockout 5
6	(Uzbekistan) Nodirbek Abdusattorov	2772	1	0	0	3	1	0	1	1	1	1			9	#22	Advanced to Knockout 6

===== Group B =====
Rank	Player	Rating November 2026	CAR		LE		RAP		KEY		ART		PRA		Total Points	TB	Qualification
1	(United States) Fabiano Caruana	2783			1	1	1	3	1	3	1	0	3	3	17	#8	Advanced to Knockout 1
2	(Vietnam) Lê Quang Liêm	2732	1	1			1	1	3	1	3	1	1	1	14	#19	Advanced to Knockout 2
3	(Hungary) Richárd Rapport	2718	0	1	1	1			1	1	1	1	3	1	11	#7	Advanced to Knockout 3
4	(Germany) Vincent Keymer	2761	0	1	1	0	1	1			1	3	1	1	10	#11	Advanced to Knockout 4
5	(FIDE) Vladislav Artemiev	2653	3	1	1	0	1	1	0	1			1	1	10	#16	Advanced to Knockout 5
6	(India) R Praggnanandhaa	2763	0	0	1	1	1	0	1	1	1	1			7	#14	Advanced to Knockout 6

===== Group C =====
Rank	Player	Rating November 2026	GIR		NEP		MAR		MAM		CAR		MIS		Total Points	TB	Qualification
1	(Netherlands) Anish Giri	2747			3	1	3	0	1	1	1	1	3	1	15	#10	Advanced to Knockout 1
2	(FIDE) Ian Nepomniachtchi	2719	1	0			3	1	1	1	1	1	3	1	13	#9	Advanced to Knockout 2
3	(Armenia) Haik M. Martirosyan	2669	3	0	1	0			0	3	3	1	1	1	13	#13	Advanced to Knockout 3
4	(Azerbaijan) Shakhriyar Mamedyarov	2709	1	1	1	1	0	3			1	1	1	1	11	#20	Advanced to Knockout 4
5	(Norway) Magnus Carlsen	2823	1	1	1	1	1	0	1	1			1	1	9	#1	Advanced to Knockout 5
6	(United States) Abhimanyu Mishra	2644	1	0	1	0	1	1	1	1	1	1			8	#18	Advanced to Knockout 6

===== Group D =====
Rank	Player	Rating November 2026	MVL		NIE		ERI		SO		ASA		VAI		Total Points	TB	Qualification
1	(France) Maxime Vachier-Lagrave	2707			3	1	1	0	3	1	3	1	1	3	17	#2	Advanced to Knockout 1
2	(United States) Hans Niemann	2697	1	0			1	1	3	0	3	1	3	3	16	#5	Advanced to Knockout 2
3	(India) Arjun Erigaisi	2746	3	1	1	1			1	3	0	3	3	0	16	#6	Advanced to Knockout 3
4	(United States) Wesley So	2771	1	0	3	0	0	1			1	1	3	3	13	#15	Advanced to Knockout 4
5	(Kazakhstan) Bibisara Assaubayeva	2532	1	0	1	0	0	3	1	1			3	0	10	#24	Advanced to Knockout 5
6	(India) Vaishali Rameshbabu	2452	0	1	0	0	3	0	0	0	3	0			7	#17	Advanced to Knockout 6

==== Knockout Stage ====
Players will advance to knockout brackets with respective order of their rankings in group stage. Winner of the Knockout Bracket 1 will become the winner of the tournament.

Semifinal pairings in each Knockout bracket are determined by their pre‑tournament blitz rank among those four, and paired 1 vs 4 and 2 vs 3. Point system is classified in the table below.

	Group Stage	Knockout Stage		
	Fast Classical	Fast Classical	Rapid	Blitz
Win	3	8	4	1
Draw	1	4	2	0.5
Loss	0	0	0	0

===== Knockout Bracket 1 =====
Semifinals
(France) Maxime Vachier-Lagrave	5.5	7.5
(Netherlands) Anish Giri	14.5	12.5
(France) Alireza Firouzja	12	5	1
(United States) Fabiano Caruana	8	15	0

Final
(Netherlands) Anish Giri	11	8	0.5
(France) Alireza Firouzja (Note: Firouzja won the final as black in the armageddon game.)	9	12	0.5
3rd-place Match
(France) Maxime Vachier-Lagrave	9	9.5
(United States) Fabiano Caruana	11	10.5

===== Knockout Bracket 2 =====
Semifinals
(United States) Hans Niemann	13.5	15.5
(Vietnam) Lê Quang Liêm	6.5	4.5
(FIDE) Ian Nepomniachtchi	15	5.5	0
(Poland) Jan-Krzysztof Duda	5	14.5	1

5th-place Match
(United States) Hans Niemann	13.5	9	1
(Poland) Jan-Krzysztof Duda	6.5	11	0
7th-place Match
(Vietnam) Lê Quang Liêm	6	14	0
(FIDE) Ian Nepomniachtchi	14	6	1

===== Knockout Bracket 3 =====
Semifinals
(India) Arjun Erigaisi	11.5	8	1
(Netherlands) Jorden van Foreest	8.5	12	0
(Hungary) Richárd Rapport	9	2
(Armenia) Haik M. Martirosyan	11	18

9th-place Match
(India) Arjun Erigaisi	5.5	9
(Armenia) Haik M. Martirosyan	14.5	11
11th-place Match
(Netherlands) Jorden van Foreest	9	12	0
(Hungary) Richárd Rapport	11	8	1

===== Knockout Bracket 4 =====
Semifinals
(United States) Levon Aronian	9	13.5	1
(Azerbaijan) Shakhriyar Mamedyarov	11	6.5	0
(Germany) Vincent Keymer	6	6.5
(United States) Wesley So	14	13.5

13th-place Match
(United States) Levon Aronian	7.5	11	0.5
(United States) Wesley So (Note: So won the 13th-place match as black in the armageddon game.)	12.5	9	0.5
15th-place Match
(Azerbaijan) Shakhriyar Mamedyarov	5.5	10
(Germany) Vincent Keymer	14.5	10

===== Knockout Bracket 5 =====
Semifinals
(Norway) Magnus Carlsen	11.5	10
(Kazakhstan) Bibisara Assaubayeva	8.5	10
(FIDE) Vladislav Artemiev	17	8	1
(United States) Andrew Hong	3	12	0

17th-place Match
(Norway) Magnus Carlsen	11	4.5	1
(FIDE) Vladislav Artemiev	9	15.5	0
19th-place Match
(Kazakhstan) Bibisara Assaubayeva	5	7
(United States) Andrew Hong	15	13

===== Knockout Bracket 6 =====
Semifinals
(India) R Praggnanandhaa	11	11.5
(Uzbekistan) Nodirbek Abdusattorov	9	8.5
(India) Vaishali Rameshbabu	7	9
(United States) Abhimanyu Mishra	13	11

21st-place Match
(India) R Praggnanandhaa	12	15
(United States) Abhimanyu Mishra	8	5
23rd-place Match
(Uzbekistan) Nodirbek Abdusattorov	16	20
(India) Vaishali Rameshbabu	4	0

==== Point Distribution ====
For the Total Chess World Championship Tour, points are awarded according to a player's final position in their respective bracket. The lowest-ranked player in each bracket receives the same number of points as the highest-ranked player in the preceding bracket. Additionally, 5 bonus points are awarded to the winner of each subsequent leg.

Rank	Knockout Bracket					
Rank	Knockout 1	Knockout 2	Knockout 3	Knockout 4	Knockout 5	Knockout 6
1st	30	20	16	12	9	6
2nd	24	18	14	11	8	5
3rd	22	17	13	10	7	4
4th	20	16	12	9	6	3
