= Roman Dehtiarov =

Ukrainian chess grandmaster (born 2008)

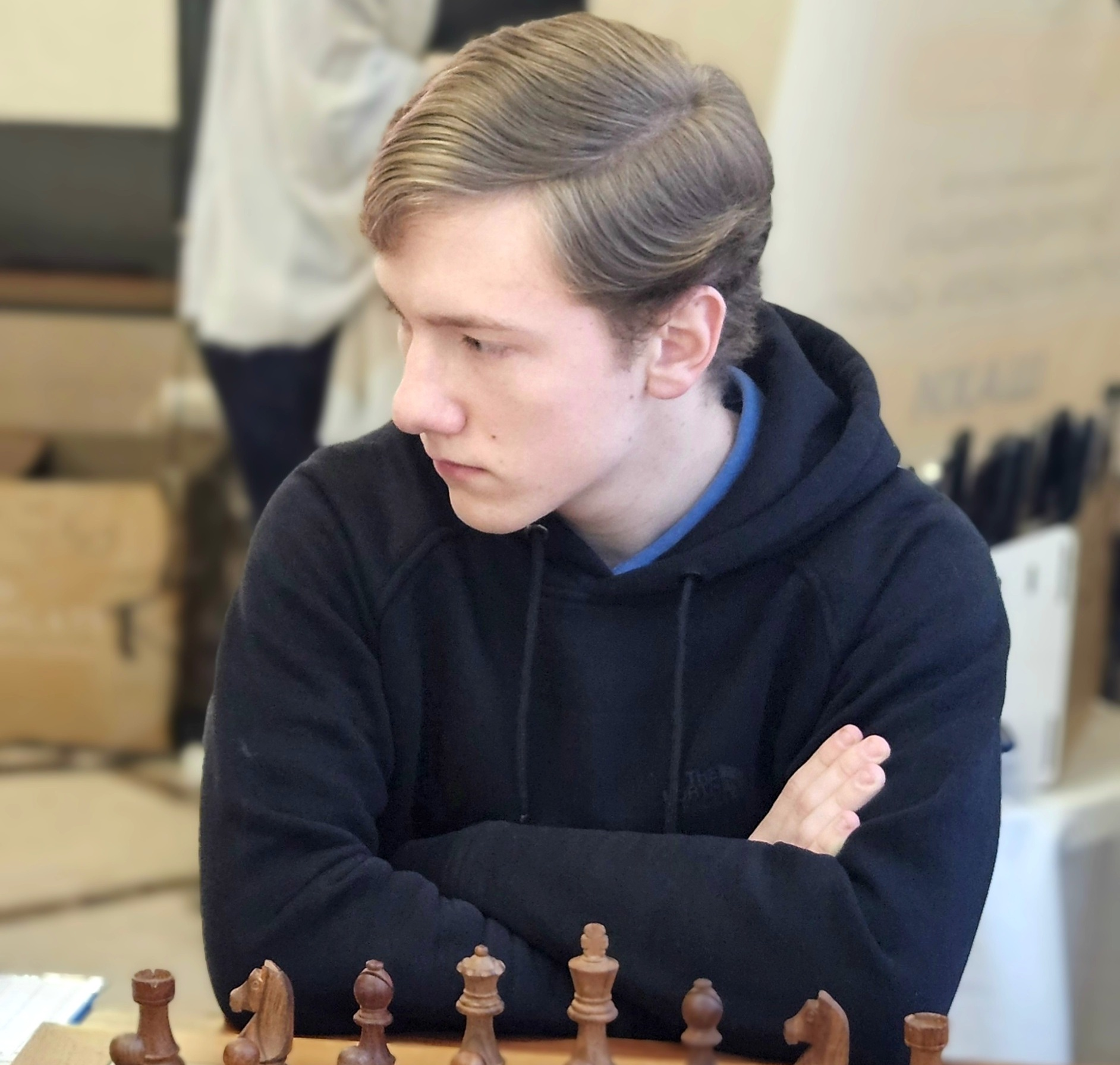
- Roman Dehtiarov in 2025

Personal information
- Born: 14 July 2008 (age 18) Kharkiv, Ukraine

Chess career
- Country: Ukraine
- Title: Grandmaster (2026)
- FIDE rating: 2508 (September 2026)
- Peak rating: 2508 (September 2026)

Roman Yuriyovych Dehtiarov (Ukrainian: Рома́н Ю́рійович Дегтярьо́в, born 14 July 2008) is a Ukrainian chess grandmaster. He is the reigning European Chess Champion.

== Chess career ==
Dehtiarov won the Ukrainian Chess Championship in 2024, scoring 7.5/9 (+7−1=1) and finishing ahead of Mykhaylo Oleksiyenko on tiebreaks.

In 2025, Dehtiarov scored 7/9 (+6−1=2) in the Ukrainian Chess Championship and finished second behind Vladislav Bakhmatsky.

In April 2026, Dehtiarov won the European Individual Chess Championship with a score of 9/11 (+8−1=2) and a performance rating of 2781, despite entering as only the 126th seed. He became the youngest player to win the European Individual Championship, as well as the first International Master to win it. The tournament victory made him eligible for the title of Grandmaster.

== Personal life ==
Dehtiarov is a student of VN Karazin Kharkiv National University.
