= Haik Martirosyan =

Armenian chess grandmaster (born 2000)

- GM Haik Martirosyan at the Prague Chess Festival Masters 2023

Personal information
- Born: Haik Martirosyan; 14 July 2000 (age 26) Byuravan, Ararat province

Chess career
- Country: Armenia
- Title: Grandmaster (2017)
- FIDE rating: 2669 (November 2026)
- Peak rating: 2708 (November 2023)
- Ranking: No. 48 (November 2026)
- Peak ranking: No. 34 (November 2023)

Haik Martirosyan (Armenian: Հայկ Միքայելի Մարտիրոսյան; born 14 July 2000) is an Armenian chess grandmaster. He was awarded the Grandmaster title by FIDE in 2017. Martirosyan is a two-time European Youth Chess Championship champion in the under-12 category, winning the title in 2011 and 2012. He won the World Youth Chess Championship in the under-16 category in 2016 and the Armenian Chess Championship in 2018.

Martirosyan reached the fourth round of the FIDE World Cup 2021, defeating sixth seed Shakhriyar Mamedyarov in the third-round rapid tiebreaks. In 2022, he won the bronze medal at the World Blitz Chess Championship, scoring 15 points from 21 rounds. In November 2023, he reached a peak classical FIDE rating of 2708 and was ranked 34th in the world. He has represented Armenia at multiple Chess Olympiads and other international team competitions. In 2026, he won the 19th Agzamov Memorial in Tashkent, Uzbekistan.

Martirosyan is currently the highest-rated Armenian player in classical chess.

== Early life and youth career ==
Martirosyan was born on 14 July 2000 in Byuravan, Armenia. He learned to play chess at the age of five. His father, Mikayel Martirosyan, was his first chess coach.

In 2011, Martirosyan won the European Youth Chess Championship in the under-12 category in Albena, Bulgaria, scoring 7½ points from nine rounds and finishing first in the final standings.

In 2012, he successfully defended his European under-12 title in Prague, scoring 8½ points from nine games and again finishing first. He therefore became a two-time European Youth Champion in the under-12 category.

== World Youth Championship ==
In 2016, Martirosyan won the under-16 section of the World Youth Chess Championship in Khanty-Mansiysk, Russia.

He scored 9 points from 11 rounds and finished first, half a point ahead of Olexandr Triapishko of Ukraine. Martirosyan remained undefeated throughout the tournament.

== Grandmaster title ==
Martirosyan progressed through the international title system and was awarded the Grandmaster title by FIDE in 2017.

In the same year, he represented the World team in the Match of the Millennials in St. Louis, United States. The World team won the match, with Martirosyan scoring 4 points from seven games.

== Career ==
In January 2018, Martirosyan won the 78th Armenian Chess Championship in Yerevan.

Later that year, he represented Armenia at the 43rd Chess Olympiad in Batumi, Georgia, scoring 6 points from 8 games.

In December 2018, Martirosyan won the 42th Zurich Christmas Open .

In February 2019, Martirosyan shared first place with Kaido Kulaots at the Aeroflot Open in Moscow. Kulaots was awarded first place on tiebreak, leaving Martirosyan second in the final standings.

== World Cup ==
Martirosyan entered the Fide world cup 2021 in Sochi, Russia, as the 59th seed.

In the third round, he defeated sixth seed Shakhriyar Mamedyarov in the rapid tiebreaks after their two classical games had been drawn.

Martirosyan then defeated Ante Brkić in the fourth round to advance to the fifth round, where he faced Amin Tabatabaei. After the classical games ended in a draw, the match was decided in a rapid tiebreak, with Tabatabaei advancing.

== World Blitz bronze medal ==
Martirosyan won the bronze medal at the World Blitz Chess Championship 2022 in Almaty, Kazakhstan.

He scored 15 points from 21 rounds and finished third in the final standings, behind Magnus Carlsen and Hikaru Nakamura.

== Peak rating and world ranking ==
Martirosyan continued to rise in the international rankings during the early 2020s.

In 2023, Martirosyan reached a classical FIDE rating above 2700. He reached his peak rating of 2708 in November 2023, when he was ranked 34th in the world.

== Chess Olympiads ==
Martirosyan has represented Armenia at multiple Chess Olympiads and other international team competitions.

At the 45th Chess Olympiad in Budapest in 2024, he played on the first board for Armenia. He scored 7 points from 11 games.

== World Rapid & Blitz Team Championships ==
At the 2025 World Rapid and Blitz Team Chess Championships, held in London, Martirosyan represented the Freedom team in both the rapid and blitz competitions.

In the Rapid Championship, Freedom finished third in the team competition, with Martirosyan scoring 5 points from eight games.

In the Blitz Championship, Martirosyan scored 8½ points from nine games.

== Agzamov Memorial ==
In March 2026, Martirosyan won the 19th Agzamov Memorial in Tashkent, Uzbekistan. The Open A tournament was played over ten rounds and featured 20 grandmasters. Martirosyan scored 7½ points, sharing first place with Artem Uskov, and remained undefeated. He won the tournament on tiebreak, with a superior Buchholz score.
