= Abhimanyu Mishra =

American chess grandmaster (born 2009)

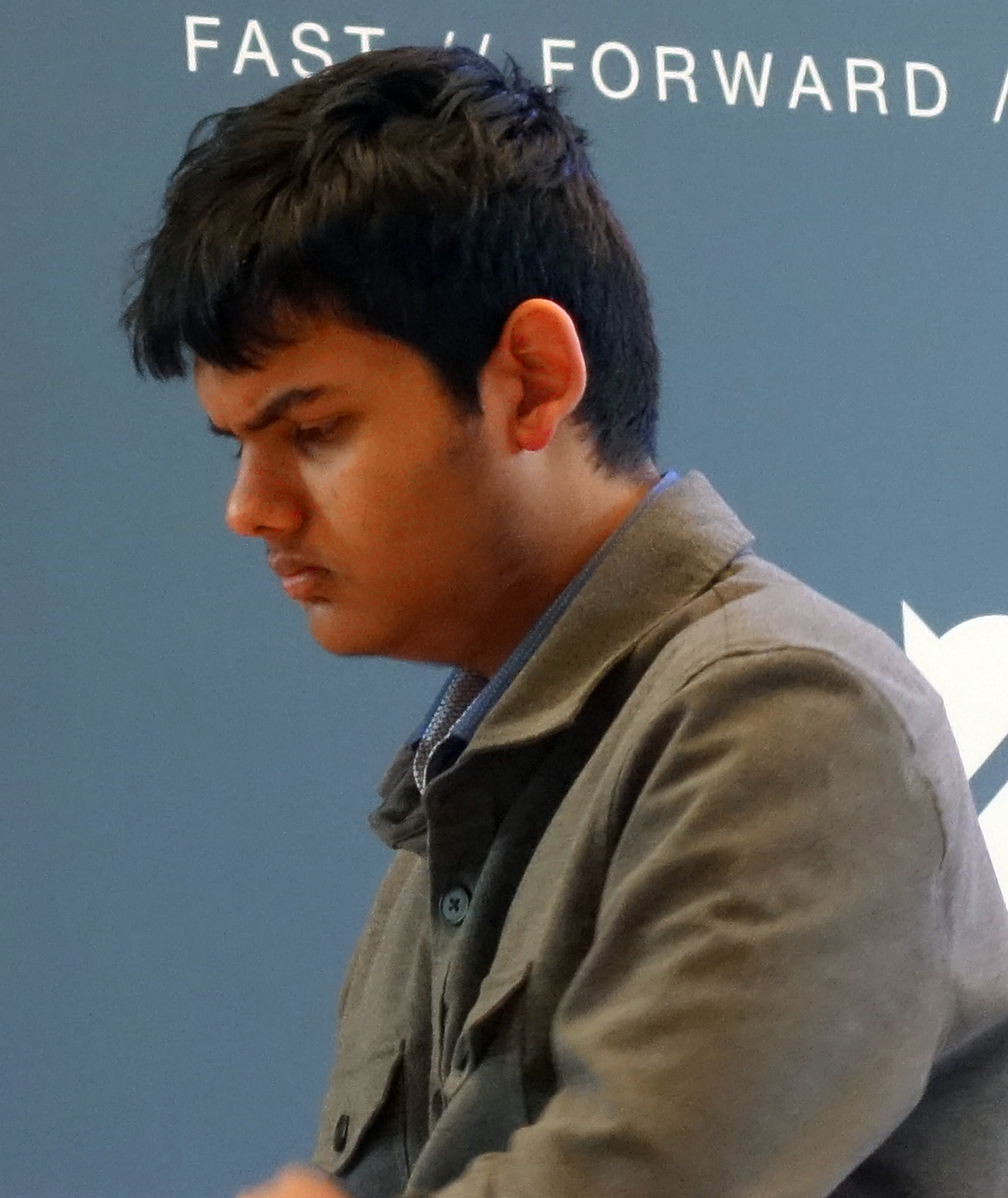
- Mishra in 2024

Personal information
- Born: February 5, 2009 (age 17) Long Branch, New Jersey, U.S.

Chess career
- Country: United States
- Title: Grandmaster (2021)
- FIDE rating: 2644 (November 2026)
- Peak rating: 2652 (October 2025)
- Ranking: No. 76 (November 2026)
- Peak ranking: No. 68 (October 2025)

Abhimanyu Mishra (born February 5, 2009) is an American chess grandmaster. A chess prodigy, he holds the record for the world's youngest ever grandmaster, having qualified for the title at the age of 12 years, 4 months, and 25 days.

In a game against Gukesh Dommaraju at the FIDE Grand Swiss Tournament 2025, Mishra, then 16 years old, became the youngest player to win a classical chess game against an incumbent World Chess Champion.

== Career ==
Abhimanyu Mishra was introduced to chess by his father, Hemant Mishra, when he was two years old. By five years old, Mishra was competing in chess tournaments.

Mishra became the youngest player ever to achieve a USCF rating of 2000 at the age of 7 years, 6 months and 22 days in September 2016, breaking the record previously held by GM Awonder Liang. Until 30 June 2024, he also held the world record for the youngest International Master (IM), a title which he earned in November 2019 at the age of 10 years, 9 months, and 20 days, breaking the record previously held by Rameshbabu Praggnanandhaa. FIDE awarded him the official title of IM in February 2020.

In March 2021, Mishra tied for first place with GM Vladimir Belous in the Charlotte Chess Center's Spring 2021 GM Norm Invitational held in Charlotte, North Carolina, U.S., with a score of 5.5/9, achieving his first FIDE rating over 2400 in the process.

In April 2021, Mishra tied for first place at the Vezérképző GM tournament in Budapest, Hungary, with a score of 7/9 and performance rating of 2603, earning his first GM norm. In May 2021, Mishra won the First Saturday GM tournament in Budapest, Hungary, with a score of 8.0/9 and performance rating of 2739, earning his second GM norm with a round to spare. In June 2021, Mishra won the Vezérképző GM Mix tournament in Budapest, Hungary, with a score of 7.0/9 and a performance rating of 2619; earning his third GM norm and making him the youngest Grandmaster in chess history, breaking the record previously held by GM Sergey Karjakin.

Mishra received congratulations from many players, including former record holder Karjakin and Magnus Carlsen. A New York Times article cited concerns about the methods used to achieve the feat. They alleged that the GM qualification structure encourages "norm" tournaments that narrowly qualify as prestigious enough to count as a GM norm, but no tougher, to make a strong performance from the candidate easier to achieve. They noted that the average rating of Mishra's opponents was noticeably lower in Hungary than in Charlotte. Ian Nepomniachtchi suggested that some changes could be made to the qualification process. In 2022 FIDE updated the rules regarding titled norms, imposing that at least one norm be obtained at a Swiss tournament with at least 40 participants of an average rating of 2000 and above.

Mishra played in the 2021 Chess World Cup, losing 1½-½ to Baadur Jobava in the first round.

Mishra won the St. Louis 2022 Spring Chess Classic B with a score of 7/9 and a tournament performance rating of 2739.

Mishra placed second in the 2023 TePe Sigeman & Co with a score of 4.5/7 and a tournament performance rating of 2742.

Mishra won the 2023 U.S. Junior Championship with a score of 6.0/9, qualifying him to play in the US Championship. In the US Championship he tied for second place with a score of 6.5/11. At the 2023 FIDE Grand Swiss he scored 5.5/11.

In September 2025, sixteen-year-old Mishra beat World Champion Gukesh Dommaraju in round five of the 2025 FIDE Grand Swiss, becoming the youngest player ever to defeat a reigning champion in a game of classical chess. Mishra scored 7/11 in tournament going undefeated and finishing fifth. He played against the highest average rating amongst all players and had a tournament performance rating of 2828, gaining 32 rating points in the process.

Achievements
Preceded by Sergey Karjakin	Youngest chess grandmaster ever 2021–present	Incumbent
