= Andrew Hong =

American chess grandmaster (born 2004)

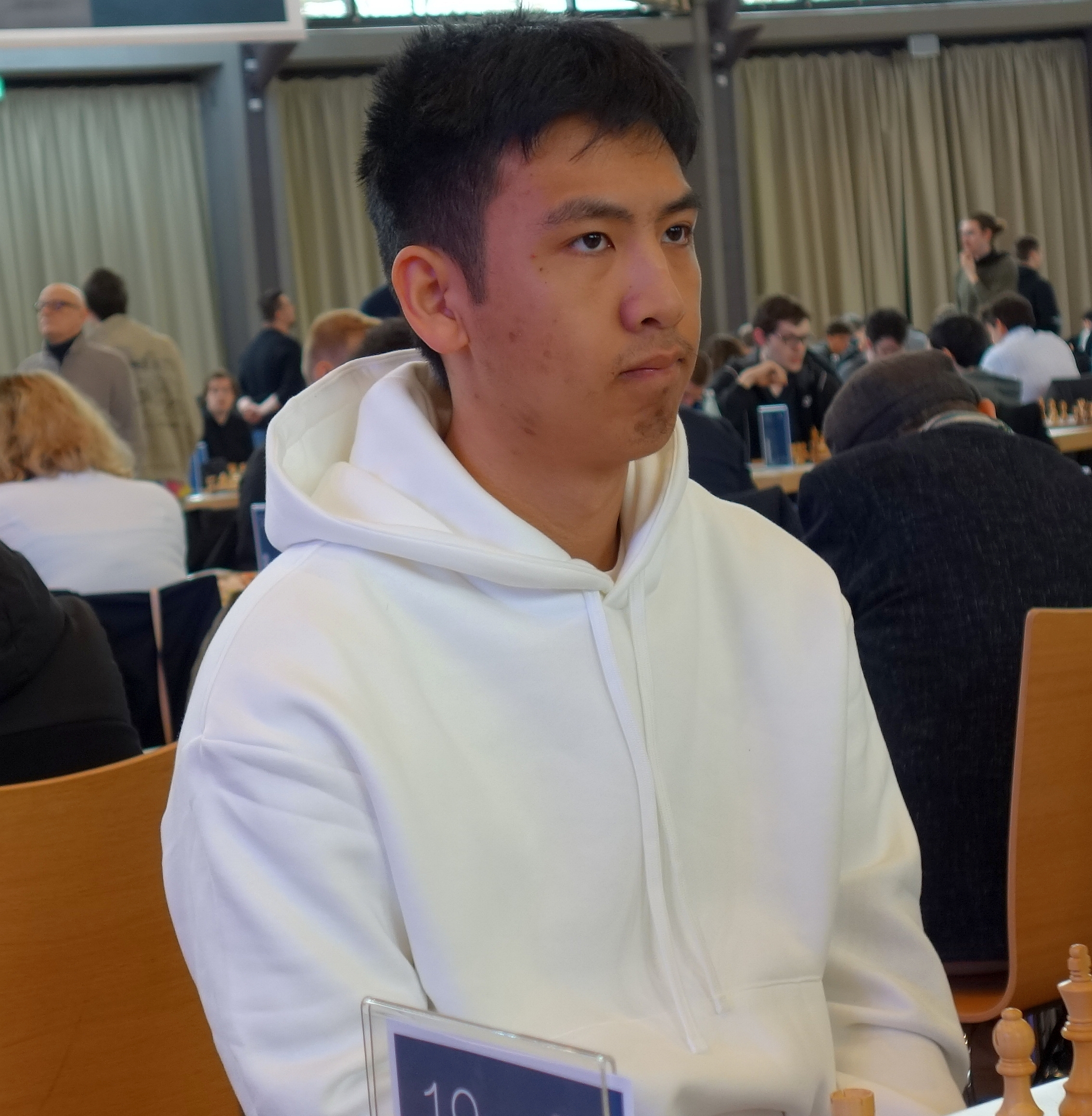
- Hong in 2024

Personal information
- Born: November 23, 2004 (age 21) San Jose, California, U.S.

Chess career
- Country: United States
- Title: Grandmaster (2021)
- FIDE rating: 2609 (October 2026)
- Peak rating: 2609 (October 2026)

Andrew Zhang Hong (born November 23, 2004) is an American chess grandmaster.

== Chess career ==
Hong became interested in chess in 2012, and was introduced to the game by his older brother. He then joined the same chess club and began playing in competitive tournaments. He was nationally ranked #1 for his age group. Hong was part of the KCF Young Stars Program, run by former World Champion Garry Kasparov.

In September 2021, Hong defeated Ian Nepomniachtchi and Wesley So at the PRO Chess League Arena Royale. Hong later earned the title of Grandmaster after achieving his final norm at the Charlotte Chess Center & Scholastic Academy Labor Day Norm Invitational in North Carolina.

In 2022, Hong participated in both the U.S. Junior Chess Championship and the Chess.com-hosted Junior Speed Chess Championship.

In December 2023, Hong played in the World Rapid and Blitz Chess Championships. In the rapid portion, he finished 59th with 7.5 points. In the blitz portion, he finished 136th with 9.5 points. During the seventh round of the Blitz championship, Hong complained that he lost on time despite pressing the clock after making a move in his game against Yu Yangyi. His appeal was rejected by the arbiters and the win was awarded to Yu.

In November 2025, Hong tied for first place at the US Masters, but lost to Awonder Liang in a playoff.

== Personal life ==
He currently attends Brown University.
