= 2026 in chess =

Major chess events in 2026 include the annual Tata Steel Chess Tournament, Prague Chess Festival, Norway Chess and Grand Chess Tour.

The Candidates Tournament and the Women's Candidates Tournament were held at Paphos, Cyprus to determine the challengers for the reigning world champions Gukesh Dommaraju and Ju Wenjun. The winners, Javokhir Sindarov and Vaishali Rameshbabu, advanced to the World Chess Championship 2026 and the Women's World Chess Championship 2027 respectively.

Uzbekistan and China won the Open and Women's sections, respectively, of the 46th Chess Olympiad held at Samarkand, Uzbekistan.

The pilot version of Total Chess World Championship Tour was held in November at Budapest, Hungary. Alireza Firouzja won the tournament defeating Anish Giri in the finals.

== Timeline ==
January 2026 FIDE rankings
Rank	Prev	Player	Rating	Change
1	1	(Norway) Magnus Carlsen	2840	0
2	2	(United States) Hikaru Nakamura	2810	0
3	3	(United States) Fabiano Caruana	2795	0
4	4	(Germany) Vincent Keymer	2776	0
5	5	(India) Arjun Erigaisi	2775	0
6	7	(Netherlands) Anish Giri	2760	9
7	6	(France) Alireza Firouzja	2759	-1
8	8	(India) R Praggnanandhaa	2758	-3
9	9	(India) Gukesh Dommaraju	2754	0
10	10	(China) Wei Yi	2754	0

=== January ===
- Jan 5 – Xu Xiangyu won the 53rd Rilton Cup with 8/9.
- Jan 5 – National Chess Federations of Ukraine, England, Norway, Estonia and Germany filed an appeal to (CAS), challenging the resolutions adopted by the FIDE General Assembly concerning the participation Russian and Belarusian national teams in international chess competitions.
- Jan 7 – FIDE made a cooperation agreement with Freestyle Chess and announced the first official Freestyle Chess World Championship which will be held at Weissenhaus in Germany from 13 to 15 February alongside a Women's exhibition match.
- Jan 9 – Nihal Sarin won the Tata Steel India Rapid tournament with 6½/9. Kateryna Lagno won the women's section with one round to spare.
- Jan 11 – Wesley So won the Tata Steel India Blitz tournament with 12/18. Carissa Yip won the women's section after defeating Vantika Agrawal in a tiebreak match.
- Jan 15 – Nodirbek Abdusattorov won the online Freestyle chess play-in event to qualify for the Freestyle Chess World Championship 2026.

February 2026 FIDE rankings
Rank	Prev	Player	Rating	Change
1	1	(Norway) Magnus Carlsen	2840	0
2	2	(United States) Hikaru Nakamura	2810	0
3	3	(United States) Fabiano Caruana	2795	0
4	4	(Germany) Vincent Keymer	2776	0
5	5	(India) Arjun Erigaisi	2775	0
6	6	(Netherlands) Anish Giri	2760	0
7	7	(France) Alireza Firouzja	2759	0
8	8	(India) R Praggnanandhaa	2758	0
9	9	(India) Gukesh Dommaraju	2754	0
10	10	(China) Wei Yi	2754	0

=== February ===
- Feb 1 – Nodirbek Abdusattorov won the Tata Steel Masters with 9/13. The Challengers section was won by American grandmaster Andy Woodward with 10/13 who qualified for the Masters section in 2027.
- Feb 8 – Magnus Carlsen won the 2025 Speed Chess Championship (Note: The semifinals and finals were held in 2026.) with 15-12 against Alireza Firouzja. Denis Lazavik finished third after defeating Hikaru Nakamura with 13½-12½ in the consolation match and qualified for Esports World Cup.
- Feb 15 – Magnus Carlsen won the FIDE Freestyle Chess World Championship after defeating Fabiano Caruana in the final, securing his maiden Chess960 title and twenty-first world title of his career.

March 2026 FIDE rankings
Rank	Prev	Player	Rating	Change
1	1	(Norway) Magnus Carlsen	2840	0
2	2	(United States) Hikaru Nakamura	2810	0
3	3	(United States) Fabiano Caruana	2795	0
4	4	(Germany) Vincent Keymer	2776	0
5	12	(Uzbekistan) Nodirbek Abdusattorov	2771	+20
6	7	(France) Alireza Firouzja	2759	0
7	10	(China) Wei Yi	2754	0
8	6	(Netherlands) Anish Giri	2753	-7
9	11	(United States) Wesley So	2753	0
10	9	(India) Gukesh Dommaraju	2748	-6

=== March ===
- Mar 1 – Mikhail Antipov won the Saint Louis Masters with 7½/9, ahead of Fabiano Caruana and Lorenzo Lodici.
- Mar 5 – Ian Nepomniachtchi won the Aeroflot Open with 7½/9, ahead of David Paravyan and Rudik Makarian.
- Mar 6 – Nodirbek Abdusattorov won the Prague Masters for the second time. IM Václav Finěk won the Challengers going undefeated and also achieved his final GM Norm.
- Mar 23 – Koneru Humpy withdrew from the Women's Candidates Tournament 2026, citing safety concerns in Cyprus due to the ongoing Iran war. She was replaced by Anna Muzychuk who was the next highest finisher in the Women's Events Leaderboard.
- Mar 26 – Haik Martirosyan won the Tashkent Open on tiebreaks, ahead of Artem Uskov.
- Mar 28 – Candidates Tournament 2026 and Women's Candidates Tournament 2026 kicks off to determine World Championship and Women's World Championship Challengers respectively.
- Mar 31 – Amin Tabatabaei won the Reykjavik Open with 8/9.

April 2026 FIDE rankings
Rank	Prev	Player	Rating	Change
1	1	(Norway) Magnus Carlsen	2840	0
2	2	(United States) Hikaru Nakamura	2810	0
3	3	(United States) Fabiano Caruana	2793	-2
4	5	(Uzbekistan) Nodirbek Abdusattorov	2780	+8
5	4	(Germany) Vincent Keymer	2762	-14
6	7	(France) Alireza Firouzja	2759	0
7	9	(United States) Wesley So	2754	+1
8	7	(China) Wei Yi	2754	0
9	8	(Netherlands) Anish Giri	2753	0
10	11	(India) Arjun Erigaisi	2751	+6

=== April ===
- Apr 6 – Vincent Keymer won the Grenke Freestyle Chess Open on tiebreaks, who had scored 7½/9 and tied for first with Maxime Vachier-Lagrave on 7½/9. He qualified for the FIDE Freestyle Chess Championship 2027. IM Mukhammadzokhid Suyarov won the regular Classical Open on tiebreaks, who had tied for first with Dominik Horvath and Zeng Chongsheng on 8/9.
- Apr 12 – Nihal Sarin won the inaugural Menorca Masters with 6/10. Abhimanyu Mishra won the 5th Menorca Open on tiebreaks, scoring 7½/9 with Leon Luke Mendonca and Li Di who placed second and third respectively.
- Apr 14 – Javokhir Sindarov won the Candidates Tournament 2026 with one round to spare, and earned the right to play in World Chess Championship 2026 against the reigning World Chess Champion Gukesh Dommaraju.
- Apr 15 – Vaishali Rameshbabu won the Women's Candidates Tournament 2026, and earned the right to play in Women's World Chess Championship 2027 against the reigning World Chess Champion Ju Wenjun.
- Apr 19 – IM Roman Dehtiarov won the European Individual Chess Championship 2026, scoring 9/11. He became the youngest player to win the European Individual Championship, as well as the first player without a grandmaster title to win it. The tournament victory made him eligible for the title of Grandmaster.
- Apr 26 – Magnus Carlsen won the Chess.com Open after defeating Jan-Krzysztof Duda in a Grand Final reset, as Duda had advanced from the Losers bracket and won the initial final match.

May 2026 FIDE rankings
Rank	Prev	Player	Rating	Change
1	1	(Norway) Magnus Carlsen	2840	0
2	2	(United States) Hikaru Nakamura	2792	-18
3	3	(United States) Fabiano Caruana	2788	-5
4	4	(Uzbekistan) Nodirbek Abdusattorov	2780	0
5	11	(Uzbekistan) Javokhir Sindarov	2776	+31
6	9	(Netherlands) Anish Giri	2767	+14
7	5	(Germany) Vincent Keymer	2759	-3
8	6	(France) Alireza Firouzja	2759	0
9	7	(United States) Wesley So	2754	0
10	8	(China) Wei Yi	2753	-1

=== May ===
- May 6 – There was a tie for first between Magnus Carlsen and Arjun Erigaisi in the TePe Sigeman & Co chess tournament. Carlsen won the tournament by defeating Erigaisi in a sudden-death game after they had tied the blitz tiebreakers by 1–1.
- May 9 – Hans Niemann won GCT Super Rapid and Blitz Poland with a score of 22½/36. Fabiano Caruana finished second with 22/36, while Wesley So finished third with 21/36.
- May 10 – Frederik Svane won the Sardinia International Chess Festival with 7½/9, ahead of Haik M. Martirosyan and Ian Nepomniachtchi.
- May 10 – Faustino Oro earned his final GM norm at the Sardinia International Chess Festival, and became the second youngest grandmaster in chess history, at the age of 12 years, 6 months and 26 days.
- May 23 – Vincent Keymer won the GCT Super Chess Classic Romania with a score of 6/9. Fabiano Caruana finished second with 5½/9, while Javokhir Sindarov and Wesley So tied for third place with 5/9.

June 2026 FIDE rankings
Rank	Prev	Player	Rating	Change
1	1	(Norway) Magnus Carlsen	2841	+1
2	3	(United States) Fabiano Caruana	2792	+4
3	2	(United States) Hikaru Nakamura	2792	0
4	5	(Uzbekistan) Javokhir Sindarov	2777	+1
5	4	(Uzbekistan) Nodirbek Abdusattorov	2777	-3
6	7	(Germany) Vincent Keymer	2767	+8
7	6	(Netherlands) Anish Giri	2764	-3
8	11	(India) Arjun Erigaisi	2761	+10
9	9	(United States) Wesley So	2753	-1
10	10	(China) Wei Yi	2753	0

=== June ===
- Jun 4 – Bibisara Assaubayeva won the Norway Chess Women 2026 with a round to spare.
- Jun 5 – R Praggnanandhaa won the Norway Chess 2026. Wesley So and Alireza Firouzja finished second and third respectively.
- Jun 14 – Mahammad Muradli won the UzChess Cup Challengers with a round to spare, and qualified for the Masters in 2027.
- Jun 15 – There was a tie for first place between Mukhiddin Madaminov and Shamsiddin Vokhidov at the UzChess Cup Masters. Madaminov won the tournament after blitz playoffs.
- Jun 19 – Dragon Chilling, led by Ding Liren, won the World Rapid Team Chess Championship after edging out defending champions Team MGD1, led by Arjun Erigaisi, and Hexamind Chess Team, led by Alireza Firouzja on tiebreaks.
- Jun 21 – Dragon Chilling, led by Ding Liren, won the World Blitz Team Chess Championship after defeating Endgame.AI, led by Hans Niemann in the finals.
- Jun 27 – Nihal Sarin won the Bullet Chess Championship hosted by Chess.com after defeating Alireza Firouzja in the grand final by winning the bracket-reset match and championship match, as Nihal had advanced from the Losers' bracket.

July 2026 FIDE rankings
Rank	Prev	Player	Rating	Change
1	1	(Norway) Magnus Carlsen	2823	-18
2	2	(United States) Fabiano Caruana	2792	0
3	3	(United States) Hikaru Nakamura	2792	0
4	4	(Uzbekistan) Javokhir Sindarov	2777	0
5	6	(Germany) Vincent Keymer	2767	0
6	5	(Uzbekistan) Nodirbek Abdusattorov	2766	-11
7	9	(United States) Wesley So	2765	+12
8	7	(Netherlands) Anish Giri	2764	0
9	8	(India) Arjun Erigaisi	2757	-4
10	10	(China) Wei Yi	2753	0

=== July ===
- Jul 3 – FIDE imposed a two-year ban on former world champion Vladimir Kramnik from all FIDE-rated competitions over his campaign of cheating allegations against David Navara and late Daniel Naroditsky, following a decision made by the Ethics and Disciplinary Commission. The second year of the ban was suspended for a three-year probationary period.
- Jul 3 – There was a tie for first place between Javokhir Sindarov and Aravindh Chithambaram at the inaugural Naroditsky Memorial Rapid on 6/7. Sindarov won the tournament after blitz playoffs.
- Jul 5 – There was a tie for first between Alireza Firouzja and Nodirbek Abdusattorov in the GCT super Rapid and Blitz Croatia on 23½/36. Firouzja won the Rapid playoff to win the tournament. Maxime Vachier-Lagrave and R Praggnanandhaa tied for third place with 21½/36.
- Jul 5 – Javokhir Sindarov won the Naroditsky Memorial Blitz by scoring 7½/9 in the Blitz Final, going undefeated.
- Jul 22 – Alireza Firouzja won the Chennai Grand Masters with 4½/7. Dmitry Andreikin and Arjun Erigaisi tied on 4/7 but finished second and third respectively on tiebreaks.
- Jul 23 – Levon Aronian won the Biel Masters with 29½/52. IM Václav Finěk won the Biel Generation Challenge with 31/49. The traditional open tournament was won by IM Christian Gloeckler with a round to spare, scoring 8/10.
- Jul 28 – FIDE announced that the World Chess Championship 2026 between the World Champion Gukesh Dommaraju and the Challenger Javokhir Sindarov would take place in Geneva, Switzerland from November 25 to December 15.
- Jul 28 – Team USA defeated Team Uzbekistan 14–10 in the WR Chess Miami Rapid & Blitz match held in Miami, Florida, United States.

August 2026 FIDE rankings
Rank	Prev	Player	Rating	Change
1	1	(Norway) Magnus Carlsen	2823	0
2	2	(United States) Fabiano Caruana	2792	0
3	3	(United States) Hikaru Nakamura	2792	0
4	4	(Uzbekistan) Javokhir Sindarov	2777	0
5	5	(Germany) Vincent Keymer	2767	0
6	7	(United States) Wesley So	2765	0
7	8	(Netherlands) Anish Giri	2764	0
8	6	(Uzbekistan) Nodirbek Abdusattorov	2762	-4
9	9	(India) Arjun Erigaisi	2759	+2
10	12	(France) Alireza Firouzja	2757	+8

=== August ===
- Aug 6 – R Praggnanandhaa won Saint Louis Rapid and Blitz with a round to spare, scoring 23½/36. Javokhir Sindarov finished second with 22/36, while Wesley So finished third with 20½/36.
- Aug 8 – Alice Lee won the Women's Speed Chess Championship 2026 after defeating Hou Yifan 11½-9½ in the final, and became the youngest ever Women's Speed Chess Champion at age 16.
- Aug 15 – Magnus Carlsen of Team Liquid retained his title at the 2026 Esports World Cup by defeating Denis Lazavik of AG.AL in the Grand final with four rounds to spare.
- Aug 19 – Former Women's World Champion, Tan Zhongyi won the Cairns Cup with 6½/9, and became the first player to win it twice. Alice Lee finished second with 6/9, and achieved her maiden GM Norm.
- Aug 19 – There was a tie for first between Wesley So and R Praggnanandhaa in the GCT Sinquefield Cup on 5½/9. So won the Rapid playoff to win the tournament. Vincent Keymer and Javokhir Sindarov tied for third place with 5/9.
- Aug 27 – R Praggnanandhaa won his maiden Grand Chess Tour title by defeating Vincent Keymer in the semifinal and Fabiano Caruana in the final of GCT Finals in Saint Louis. Wesley So won the third-place match against Vincent Keymer to secure automatic qualification for the Grand Chess Tour 2027, along with Praggnanandhaa and Caruana.

September 2026 FIDE rankings
Rank	Prev	Player	Rating	Change
1	1	(Norway) Magnus Carlsen	2823	0
2	3	(United States) Hikaru Nakamura	2792	0
3	2	(United States) Fabiano Caruana	2789	-3
4	4	(Uzbekistan) Javokhir Sindarov	2778	+1
5	6	(United States) Wesley So	2774	+9
6	5	(Germany) Vincent Keymer	2764	-3
7	8	(Uzbekistan) Nodirbek Abdusattorov	2762	0
8	12	(India) R Praggnanandhaa	2761	+11
9	9	(India) Arjun Erigaisi	2759	0
10	7	(Netherlands) Anish Giri	2757	-7

=== September ===
- Sep 13 – Team Ganges Grandmasters, led by Ian Nepomniachtchi won the Global Chess League 2026 after defeating the defending champions Team Alpine APL Pipers, led by Magnus Carlsen in the finals.
- Sep 26 – Timur Turlov was elected as the new FIDE president with Viswanathan Anand as his deputy, succeeding Arkady Dvorkovich, who had stepped down previously after being included on the European Union's sanction list.
- Sep 27 – The host teams Uzbekistan won the Open section of the 46th Chess Olympiad with 20 match points, securing their second Chess Olympiad title. The defending champions India tied for second place with Germany on 18 points but won silver and bronze medals respectively on tiebreaks.
- Sep 27 – China won the Women's Section of the 46th Chess Olympiad with 20 points, securing their seventh Women's Chess Olympiad title. Kazakhstan finished in second place with 18 points while the defending champions India finished third with 17 points after edging out the United States, Poland, Armenia and Mongolia on tiebreaks.

October 2026 FIDE rankings
Rank	Prev	Player	Rating	Change
1	1	(Norway) Magnus Carlsen	2823	0
2	2	(United States) Hikaru Nakamura	2792	0
3	3	(United States) Fabiano Caruana	2784	-5
4	4	(Uzbekistan) Javokhir Sindarov	2782	+4
5	7	(Uzbekistan) Nodirbek Abdusattorov	2780	+18
6	5	(United States) Wesley So	2770	-4
7	8	(India) R Praggnanandhaa	2763	+2
8	6	(Germany) Vincent Keymer	2761	-3
9	12	(China) Wei Yi	2758	+7
10	11	(France) Alireza Firouzja	2757	0

=== October ===
- Oct 5 – Hikaru Nakamura became the first player in history to reach a 3500 blitz rating on Chess.com.
- Oct 21 – WIM Rachael Li won the U.S. Women's Chess Championship with 8½/11, becoming the youngest player to win on her first appearance and second-youngest to win the tournament.
- Oct 22 – There was a tie for first between Wesley So and the defending champion Fabiano Caruana in the U.S. Chess Championship on 7/11. So won the Rapid playoff to win his fourth U.S. Championship title.
- Oct 29 – FIDE announced that the 2026 World Rapid and Blitz Championships would take place in Istanbul, Turkey, from 25 to 31 December 2026.
- Oct 29 – Javokhir Sindarov won the Clutch Chess - Champions Showdown 2026 with 20½/36. R Praggnanandhaa finished second with 19/36, while Fabiano Caruana finished third with 16½/36.

November 2026 FIDE rankings
Rank	Prev	Player	Rating	Change
1	1	(Norway) Magnus Carlsen	2823	0
2	2	(United States) Hikaru Nakamura	2792	0
3	3	(United States) Fabiano Caruana	2783	-1
4	4	(Uzbekistan) Javokhir Sindarov	2782	0
5	5	(Uzbekistan) Nodirbek Abdusattorov	2772	-8
6	6	(United States) Wesley So	2771	+1
7	7	(India) R Praggnanandhaa	2763	0
8	9	(China) Wei Yi	2761	+3
9	8	(Germany) Vincent Keymer	2761	0
10	10	(France) Alireza Firouzja	2757	0

=== November ===
- Nov 3 – Denis Lazavik won the KazChess Masters in Almaty with 6½/9, finishing half a point ahead of Daniil Dubov.
- Nov 4 – Khumoyun Begmuratov won the World Junior Rapid Championship with 7½/9. Pranav V and Read Samadov finished second and third respectively on tiebreaks, scoring 7/9 and ahead of International Masters, Robert Piliposyan and Aleks Sahakyan. Eline Roebers won in the women's section.
- Nov 6 – Pranav V won the World Junior Blitz Championship with 10½/13. International Masters, Eldiar Orozbaev and Robert Piliposyan finished second and third respectively on tiebreaks, scoring 9½/13 and ahead of FM Mazen Fandi. WGM Valeria Kleymenova won in the women's section.
- Nov 20 – Alireza Firouzja won the Total Chess World Championship Tour Pilot in Budapest, defeating Anish Giri in an Armageddon tiebreak after drawing with the black pieces. Fabiano Caruana finished third ahead of Maxime Vachier-Lagrave, with all four semifinalists qualifying for the 2027 tour.

== Events ==
=== World Championship ===
World Chess Championship 2026
	Rating	Match games														Points
	Rating	1	2	3	4	5	6	7	8	9	10	11	12	13	14	Points
Javokhir Sindarov (UZB)	2782															
Gukesh Dommaraju (IND)	2710															

World Champion Gukesh Dommaraju will defend his title against Javokhir Sindarov at the World Chess Championship, which will be held in Geneva from 24 November to 12 December. It will be played to a best of 14 games, with tiebreaks if required.

=== Major tournaments ===
Tournament	City	System	Dates	Players (2700+)	Winner	Runner-up	Third
Tata Steel Masters	(Netherlands) Wijk aan Zee	Round robin	16 Jan – 1 Feb	14 (11)	(Uzbekistan) Nodirbek Abdusattorov	(Uzbekistan) Javokhir Sindarov	(Netherlands) Jorden van Foreest
Prague Masters	(Czech Republic) Prague	Round robin	24 Feb – 6 Mar	10 (7)	(Uzbekistan) Nodirbek Abdusattorov	(Iran) Parham Maghsoodloo	(India) Aravindh Chithambaram
Candidates Tournament	(Cyprus) Paphos	Double round robin	28 Mar – 16 Apr	8 (6)	(Uzbekistan) Javokhir Sindarov	(Netherlands) Anish Giri	(United States) Fabiano Caruana
TePe Sigeman & Co tournament	(Sweden) Malmö	Round robin	1 – 7 May	8 (5)	(Norway) Magnus Carlsen	(India) Arjun Erigaisi	(Uzbekistan) Nodirbek Abdusattorov (Turkey) Yağız Kaan Erdoğmuş
GCT Romania	(Romania) Bucharest	Round robin	12 – 24 May	10 (9)	(Germany) Vincent Keymer	(United States) Fabiano Caruana	(Uzbekistan) Javokhir Sindarov (United States) Wesley So
Norway Chess	(Norway) Oslo	Double round robin	25 May – 5 Jun	6 (6)	(India) R Praggnanandhaa	(United States) Wesley So	(France) Alireza Firouzja
Stepan Avagyan Memorial	(Armenia) Jermuk	Round robin	29 May – 6 Jun	10 (1)	(United States) Samuel Sevian	(FIDE) Vladislav Artemiev	(India) Nihal Sarin
UzChess Cup Masters	(Uzbekistan) Tashkent	Round robin	7 – 15 Jun	10 (6)	(Uzbekistan) Mukhiddin Madaminov	(Uzbekistan) Shamsiddin Vokhidov	(FIDE) Ian Nepomniachtchi
Biel Masters	(Switzerland) Biel/Bienne	Multi-stage	11 – 24 Jul	6 (3)	(United States) Levon Aronian	(Azerbaijan) Aydin Suleymanli	(Turkey) Yağız Kaan Erdoğmuş
Chennai Grand Masters	(India) Chennai	Round robin	16 – 22 Jul	8 (7)	(France) Alireza Firouzja	(FIDE) Dmitry Andreikin	(India) Arjun Erigaisi
Sinquefield Cup	(United States) St. Louis	Round robin	10 – 20 Aug	10 (10)	(United States) Wesley So	(India) R Praggnanandhaa	(Uzbekistan) Javokhir Sindarov (Germany) Vincent Keymer
GCT Finals	(United States) St. Louis	Single elimination	22 – 27 Aug	4 (4)	(India) R Praggnanandhaa	(United States) Fabiano Caruana	(United States) Wesley So
Chess Olympiad	(Uzbekistan) Samarkand	Swiss	16 – 27 Sep	Teams	Uzbekistan	India	Germany
Asian Nations Cup	(United Arab Emirates) Abu Dhabi	Swiss	10 – 17 Nov	Teams	(FIDE) Russia	India	China
Total Chess World Championship Pilot	(Hungary) Budapest	Multi-stage	10 – 21 Nov	24 (17)	(France) Alireza Firouzja	(Netherlands) Anish Giri	(United States) Fabiano Caruana
London Chess Classic	(United Kingdom) London	Round robin	25 Nov – 4 Dec	10 (3)			

=== Opens ===
Tournament	City	TAR	Dates	Players	Winner	Runner-up	Third
Saint Louis Masters	(United States) St. Louis	2628 1/6	24 Feb – 2 Mar	70	(United States) Mikhail Antipov	(United States) Fabiano Caruana	(Italy) Lorenzo Lodici
Aeroflot Open	(Russia) Moscow	2645 1/6	27 Feb – 6 Mar	180	(FIDE) Ian Nepomniachtchi	(FIDE) David Paravyan	(FIDE) Rudik Makarian
Tashkent Open – Agzamov Memorial	(Uzbekistan) Tashkent	2586 1/6	17 – 26 Mar	101	(Armenia) Haik M. Martirosyan	(FIDE) Artem Uskov	(Uzbekistan) Abdimalik Abdisalimov
Reykjavik Open	(Iceland) Reykjavík	2609	25 – 31 Mar	422	(Iran) Amin Tabatabaei	(United States) Zhou Jianchao	(Ukraine) Vasyl Ivanchuk
Open Internacional Alicante	(Spain) Alicante	2574 3/4	1 – 6 Apr	520	(Ukraine) Igor Kovalenko	(United States) Abhimanyu Mishra	(Ukraine) Vasyl Ivanchuk
Grenke Chess Open	(Germany) Karlsruhe	2590 3/4	2 – 6 Apr	1098	(Uzbekistan) Mukhammadzokhid Suyarov	(Austria) Dominik Horvath	(China) Zeng Chongsheng
Menorca Open	(Spain) Menorca	2606 1/4	7 – 12 Apr	394	(United States) Abhimanyu Mishra	(India) Leon Luke Mendonca	(China) Li Di
European Individual Championship	(Poland) Katowice	2644 1/12	7 – 19 Apr	501	(Ukraine) Roman Dehtiarov	(Azerbaijan) Nijat Abasov	(Azerbaijan) Aydin Suleymanli
Sardinia World Chess Festival	(Italy) Orosei	2637 5/6	3 – 10 May	160	(Germany) Frederik Svane	(Armenia) Haik M. Martirosyan	(FIDE) Ian Nepomniachtchi
Asian Individual Championship	(Mongolia) Ulaanbaatar	2609 1/12	28 May – 7 Jun	143	(China) Kong Xiangrui	(China) Xiao Tong	(FIDE) Zhamsaran Tsydypov
Aktobe Open – Vladimir Dvorkovich Memorial	(Kazakhstan) Aktobe	2614 1/6	3 – 11 Jun	81	(United States) Andrew Hong	(Kazakhstan) Daniyal Sapenov	(FIDE) Daniil Dubov
Dole Open	(France) Aix-en-provence	2647 5/12	18 – 26 Jul	297	(Armenia) Robert Hovhannisyan	(Armenia) Haik M. Martirosyan	(India) Leon Luke Mendonca
Oskemen Open	(Kazakhstan) Oskemen	2596 5/6	20 – 30 Jul	77	(FIDE) Andrey Esipenko	(FIDE) Polina Shuvalova	(FIDE) David Paravyan
Sparkassen Chess Trophy	(Germany) Dortmund	2567 2/3	1 – 9 Aug	208	(Norway) Elham Amar	(Mongolia) Amilal Munkhdalai	(Poland) Kacper Piorun
Torneo Internazionale di scacchi di Spilimbergo	(Italy) Spilimbergo	2570	8 – 15 Aug	241	(Belgium) Daniel Dardha	(Israel) Ido Gorshtein	(United States) Nico Chasin
Kanizsa Open	(Hungary) Nagykanizsa	2605 1/12	15 – 23 Aug	226	(India) Pranesh M	(Israel) Or Bronstein	(Ukraine) Andrei Volokitin
Abu Dhabi Masters	(United Arab Emirates) Abu Dhabi	2576 2/3	15 – 24 Aug	109	(Uzbekistan) Jakhongir Vakhidov	(FIDE) Daniil Dubov	(FIDE) Aleksandr Rakhmanov
Atyrau Masters	(Kazakhstan) Atyrau	2591	12 – 20 Oct	109	(Armenia) Emin Ohanyan	(China) Jiang Haochen	(Georgia (country)) Baadur Jobava
U.S. Masters	(United States) Charlotte		25 – 29 Nov				
London Chess Classic – Open	(United Kingdom) London		27 Nov – 4 Dec				

=== Rapid and Blitz events ===
Tournament	City	System	Dates	Players	Winner	Runner-up	Third
Tata Steel India Rapid	(India) Kolkata	Round robin	7 – 9 Jan	10	(India) Nihal Sarin	(India) Viswanathan Anand	(India) Arjun Erigaisi
Tata Steel India Blitz	(India) Kolkata	Double round robin	10 – 11 Jan	10	(United States) Wesley So	(India) Nihal Sarin	(India) Arjun Erigaisi
2025 Speed Chess Championship finals (Note: This tournament is part of the Champions Chess Tour 2025–2026, which uses Chess.com and not a standard board.)	(United Kingdom) London	Single elimination	7 – 8 Feb	4	(Norway) Magnus Carlsen	(France) Alireza Firouzja	(FIDE) Denis Lazavik
Menorca Master Tournament	(Spain) Menorca	Double round robin	7 – 12 Apr	6	(India) Nihal Sarin	(Ukraine) Ruslan Ponomariov	(Hungary) Richárd Rapport
Chess.com Open playoffs	Online	Double elimination	23 – 26 Apr	16	(Norway) Magnus Carlsen	(Poland) Jan-Krzysztof Duda	(FIDE) Denis Lazavik
GCT Poland	(Poland) Warsaw	Round robin (Note: The rapid portion of the tournament is a single round robin, while the blitz portion is a double round robin.)	3 – 10 May	10	(United States) Hans Niemann	(United States) Fabiano Caruana	(United States) Wesley So
Grand Prix PlusCity – Rapid	(Austria) Pasching	Swiss	14 May	432	(India) Pranav V	(Spain) Eduardo Iturrizaga	(Iran) Parham Maghsoodloo
Grand Prix PlusCity – Blitz	(Austria) Pasching	Swiss	15 May	416	(Poland) Szymon Gumularz	(Ukraine) Anton Korobov	(Iran) Parham Maghsoodloo
Road to EWC – DreamHack Atlanta (Note: This tournament uses Chess.com and not a standard board.)	(United States) Atlanta	Double elimination	15 – 17 May	36	(India) Aravindh Chithambaram	(Serbia) Alexey Sarana	(Vietnam) Lê Quang Liêm
ASEAN Esports Chess Cup	(Thailand) Bangkok	Multi-stage	13 Jun	22	(Norway) Magnus Carlsen	(FIDE) Andrey Esipenko	(Vietnam) Lê Quang Liêm
GCT Croatia	(Croatia) Zagreb	Round robin	29 Jun – 6 Jul	10	(France) Alireza Firouzja	(Uzbekistan) Nodirbek Abdusattorov	(France) Maxime Vachier-Lagrave (India) R Praggnanandhaa
Naroditsky Memorial – Rapid	(United States) Charlotte	Swiss	3 Jul	93	(Uzbekistan) Javokhir Sindarov	(India) Aravindh Chithambaram	(United States) Andy Woodward (Ukraine) Ruslan Ponomariov (United States) Ray Robson (United States) Andrew Hong
Naroditsky Memorial – Blitz	(United States) Charlotte	Multi-stage	4 – 5 Jul	93	(Uzbekistan) Javokhir Sindarov	(United States) Wesley So	(United States) Ethan Sheehan
GCT St. Louis	(United States) St. Louis	Round robin	31 Jul – 7 Aug	10	(India) R Praggnanandhaa	(Uzbekistan) Javokhir Sindarov	(United States) Wesley So
Esports World Cup (Note: Part of the 2026 Esports World Cup tournament series held in Paris. This tournament is part of the Champions Chess Tour 2025–2026, which uses Chess.com and not a standard board.)	(France) Paris	Multi-stage	11 – 15 Aug	22	(Norway) Magnus Carlsen	(FIDE) Denis Lazavik	(United States) Hikaru Nakamura
Sofia Cup – Rapid	(Bulgaria) Sofia	Swiss	29 Aug	185	(Azerbaijan) Rauf Mamedov	(France) Alireza Firouzja	(Greece) Dimitris Alexakis
Sofia Cup – Blitz	(Bulgaria) Sofia	Swiss	30 Aug	191	(France) Alireza Firouzja	(Turkey) Ediz Gürel	(Azerbaijan) Rauf Mamedov
Green Hills Resort Masters	(Uzbekistan) Tashkent	Round Robin	30 – 31 Aug	8	(Uzbekistan) Nodirbek Yakubboev	(Uzbekistan) Nodirbek Abdusattorov	(FIDE) Vladislav Artemiev
Shenzhen Masters	(China) Shenzhen	Single elimination	8 – 13 Oct	12	(China) Yu Yangyi	(China) Ding Liren	(China) Wang Hao
Clutch Chess – Champions Showdown	(United States) St. Louis	Double round robin	27 – 29 Oct	4	(Uzbekistan) Javokhir Sindarov	(India) R Praggnanandhaa	(United States) Fabiano Caruana
Jerusalem Masters	(Israel) Jerusalem	Round robin	23 – 26 Nov	12			
London Chess Classic – Super Rapid	(United Kingdom) London	Swiss	5 – 7 Dec	TBD			
World Rapid Championship	(Turkey) Istanbul	Swiss	25 – 31 December	TBD			
World Blitz Championship	(Turkey) Istanbul	Multi-stage	25 – 31 December	TBD			

=== Women's events ===
Tournament	City	System	Dates	Players (2500+)	Winner	Runner-up	Third
Tata Steel India Rapid	(India) Kolkata	Round robin	7 – 9 Jan	10 (2)	(FIDE) Kateryna Lagno	(FIDE) Aleksandra Goryachkina	(India) Divya Deshmukh
Tata Steel India Blitz	(India) Kolkata	Double round robin	10 – 11 Jan	10 (2)	(United States) Carissa Yip	(India) Vantika Agrawal	(Greece) Stavroula Tsolakidou
Candidates Tournament	(Cyprus) Paphos	Double round robin	28 Mar – 16 Apr	8 (6)	(India) Vaishali Rameshbabu	(Kazakhstan) Bibisara Assaubayeva	(China) Zhu Jiner
Norway Chess	(Norway) Oslo	Double round robin	25 May – 5 Jun	6 (6)	(Kazakhstan) Bibisara Assaubayeva	(China) Zhu Jiner	(Ukraine) Anna Muzychuk
WR Chess Tour – Asia Leg	(Japan) Tokyo	Single elimination	6 – 7 Jun	8 (1)	(India) Vaishali Rameshbabu	(FIDE) Kateryna Lagno	(Switzerland) Alexandra Kosteniuk
Cairns Cup	(United States) St. Louis	Round robin	8 – 21 Aug	10 (5)	(China) Tan Zhongyi	(United States) Alice Lee	(Kazakhstan) Bibisara Assaubayeva (United States) Carissa Yip
WR Chess Tour – Africa Leg	(Mozambique) Maputo	Single elimination	21 – 23 Aug	8 (1)	(Estonia) Mai Narva	(China) Zhu Jiner	(Egypt) Shrook Wafa
WR Chess Tour – Europe Leg	(France) Saint-Tropez	Single elimination	25 – 27 Aug	8 (3)	(Kazakhstan) Bibisara Assaubayeva	(Ukraine) Anna Muzychuk	(Ukraine) Mariya Muzychuk
Chess Olympiad	(Uzbekistan) Samarkand	Swiss	16 – 27 Sep	Teams	China	Kazakhstan	India
Asian Nations Cup	(United Arab Emirates) Abu Dhabi	Swiss	10 – 17 Nov	Teams	(FIDE) Russia	China	Kazakhstan
WR Chess Tour – Grand Final	(Germany) Stuttgart	Single elimination	22 – 23 Nov	8 (3)			
World Rapid Championship	(Turkey) Istanbul	Swiss	25 – 31 December	TBD			
World Blitz Championship	(Turkey) Istanbul	Multi-stage	25 – 31 December	TBD			

=== National events ===
Tournament	City	System	Dates	Players	Winner	Runner-up	Third
Armenian Championship	(Armenia) Yerevan	Round robin	13 – 22 Jan	10	Manuel Petrosyan	Artur Davtyan	Zaven Andriasian
Israeli Championship	(Israel) Akko	Swiss	19 – 27 Jan	109	Yahli Sokolovsky	Yeshaayahu Tzidkiya	Evgeny Alekseev
Georgian Championship	(Georgia (country)) Tbilisi	Round robin	27 Jan – 5 Feb	10	Baadur Jobava	Tornike Sanikidze	Luka Kiladze
Singaporean Championship	Singapore	Swiss	2 – 15 Feb	31	Tin Jingyao	Liu Xiangyi	Sreekarthika Velmurugan
Azerbaijani Championship	(Azerbaijan) Baku	Single elimination	7 – 22 Feb	26	Mahammad Muradli	Shakhriyar Mamedyarov	Aydin Suleymanli
Montenegrin Championship	(Montenegro) Podgorica	Swiss	10 – 20 Feb	62	Denis Kadrić	Nikola Djukić	Jovan Milović
Romanian Championship	(Romania) Timișoara	Swiss	13 – 22 Feb	73	Bogdan-Daniel Deac	Filip Magold	Constantin Lupulescu
American Cup	(United States) St. Louis	Double elimination	2 – 13 Mar	8	Wesley So	Levon Aronian	Fabiano Caruana
Polish Championship	(Poland) Warsaw	Round robin	22 – 30 Mar	10	Szymon Gumularz	Jakub Kosakowski	Łucasz Licznerski
Lithuanian Championship	(Lithuania) Klaipėda	Swiss	28 Mar – 2 Apr	53	Titas Stremavičius	Pijus Stremavičius	Gleb Pidluznij
Mexican Championship	(Mexico) Querétaro	Swiss	31 Mar – 5 Apr	112	José Martínez Alcántara	Sion Radamantys Galaviz	Juan Carlos González Zamora
Canadian Championship	(Canada) Montreal	Swiss	2 – 7 Apr	85	Shawn Rodrigue-Lemieux	Anthony Atanasov	Sai Krishna G V
Latvian Championship	(Latvia) Riga	Round robin	1 – 8 May	10	Toms Kantāns	Nikita Meshkovs	Arturs Neikšāns
Icelandic Championship	(Iceland) Garðabær	Round robin	1 – 9 May	10	Hilmir Freyr Heimisson	Vignir Vatnar Stefansson	Hannes Stefánsson
Kazakhstani Championship	(Kazakhstan) Astana	Round robin	2 – 12 May	14	Sauat Nurgaliyev	Zhandos Agmanov	Ramazan Zhalmakhanov
Czech Championship	(Czech Republic) Brno	Round robin	7 – 16 May	10	David Navara	Václav Finěk	Štěpán Žilka
Chinese Championship	(China) Xinghua	Swiss	9 – 18 May	67	Xu Xiangyu	Kong Xiangrui	Xu Yinglun
Serbian Championship	(Serbia) Senta	Round robin	13 – 21 Jun	10	Bojan Maksimović	Stefan Tadić	Mikhail Bryakin
Slovak Championship	(Slovakia) Bratislava	Round robin	13 – 21 Jun	10	Viktor Gažík	Peter Michalik	Juraj Druska
Peruvian Championship	(Peru) Lima	Round robin	15 – 22 Jun	12	Jorge Cori	Fernando Fernández Sánchez	German Quirhuayo
Philippine Championship	(Philippines) Quezon City	Round robin	24 Jun – 2 Jul	14	Jan Emmanuel Garcia	Darwin Laylo	Michael Concio
Swedish Championship	(Sweden) Jönköping	Round robin	26 Jun – 4 Jul	10	Edvin Trost	Seo Jung-min	Erik Blomqvist
Norwegian Championship	(Norway) Kristiansund	Swiss	3 – 11 Jul	22	Elham Amar	Tor Fredrik Kaasen	Frode Urkedal
Dutch Championship	(Netherlands) Aalsmeer	Single elimination	4 – 11 Jul	16	Sergei Tiviakov	Liam Vrolijk	Max Warmerdam; Erik van den Doel
Belgian Championship	(Belgium) Antwerp	Round robin	4 – 12 Jul	10	Daniel Dardha	Elias Ruzhansky	Mher Hovhannisyan
Swiss Championship	(Switzerland) Grächen	Round robin	11 – 19 Jul	10	Teimur Toktomushev	Li Min Peng	Nico Georgiadis
German Championship	(Germany) Dresden	Round robin	17 – 25 Jul	10	Leonardo Costa	Bennet Hagner	Luis Engel
British Championship	(United Kingdom) Coventry	Swiss	1 – 9 Aug	108	Shreyas Royal	Luke McShane	Michael Adams
French Championship	(France) Vichy	Single elimination	7 – 16 Aug	16	Étienne Bacrot	Maxime Lagarde	Marc'Andria Maurizzi
Austrian Championship	(Austria) Linz	Round robin	15 – 23 Aug	10	Dominik Horvath	Laurenz Borrmann	Valentin Baidetskyi
Hungarian Championship	(Hungary) Nagykanizsa	Swiss	15 – 23 Aug	226	Bence Korpa	Ádám Kozák	Sanan Sjugirov
Spanish Championship	(Spain) Linares	Swiss	17 – 25 Aug	136	Alan Pichot	Daniil Yuffa	Eduardo Iturrizaga
Russian Championship	(Russia) Rostov-on-Don	Round robin	1 – 12 Oct	12	Andrey Esipenko	Evgeniy Najer	David Paravyan
Greek Championship	(Greece) Psara	Round robin	3 – 11 Oct	10	Evgenios Ioannidis	Ioannis Nikolaidis	Michael Vassis
U.S. Championship	(United States) St. Louis	Round robin	9 – 23 Oct	12	Wesley So	Fabiano Caruana	Jeffery Xiong; Grigoriy Oparin
Indian Championship	(India) Varanasi	Swiss	29 Nov – 10 Dec	150			
Italian Championship	(Italy) Spilimbergo	Single elimination	1 – 12 Dec	16			
Argentine Championship	(Argentina) La Plata	Round robin	2 – 11 Dec	12			
Turkish Championship	(Turkey) Gaziantep	Single elimination	3 – 14 Dec	26			
Brazilian Championship	(Brazil) Teresina	Swiss	5 – 12 Dec	100			
Ukrainian Championship	(Ukraine) Lviv	Swiss	9 – 17 Dec	150			
Colombian Championship	(Colombia) Pereira	Round robin	12 – 23 Dec	12			

== Deaths ==
- 6 February – Bruno Parma, Slovene-Yugoslav grandmaster
- 18 February – Jan Timman, Dutch grandmaster and author
- 8 March – Slavoljub Marjanović, Serbian grandmaster
- 21 May – Jan Adamski, Polish chess player
- 24 May – Ján Plachetka, Slovak grandmaster
- 28 June – Tamás Horváth, Hungarian International Master
- 6 July – Iivo Nei, Estonian grandmaster
- 18 August – Vereslav Eingorn, Ukrainian grandmaster, coach and author
- 15 September – Georgios Makropoulos, Greek International Master, former FIDE Vice President
