= Shenzhen Masters =

Chinese chess tournament (2017-pres.)

The Shenzhen Masters is an annual chess tournament held in the Longgang District of Shenzhen, Guangdong province, China. In 2021, an online edition was held on Chess.com due to the COVID-19 pandemic.

== Winners ==
#	Year	Winner
1	2017	Ding Liren (China)
2	2018	Maxime Vachier-Lagrave (France)
3	2019	Anish Giri (Netherlands)
4	2021	Yu Yangyi (China)
5	2024	Bu Xiangzhi (China)
6	2025	Ding Liren (China)
7	2026	Yu Yangyi (China)

== Event crosstables ==
=== 2017 ===
1st Du Te Cup, 23 March – 1 April 2017, Shenzhen, China, Category XXI (2756)
	Player	Rating	1	2	3	4	5	6	Points	H2H	SB	TPR
1	Ding Liren (China)	2759		½ ½	1 ½	½ 1	½ 1	½ ½	6½			2865
2	Anish Giri (Netherlands)	2769	½ ½		½ ½	½ ½	1 ½	½ ½	5½	1	26.75	2789
3	Peter Svidler (Russia)	2741	0 ½	½ ½		½ ½	½ 1	½ 1	5½	1	25.25	2795
4	Yu Yangyi (China)	2750	½ 0	½ ½	½ ½		½ ½	½ ½	4½	1	22.25	2721
5	Pentala Harikrishna (India)	2758	½ 0	0 ½	½ 0	½ ½		1 1	4½	1	20.25	2720
6	Michael Adams (England)	2761	½ ½	½ ½	½ 0	½ ½	0 0		3½			2645

=== 2018 ===
2nd Du Te Cup, 4–13 November 2018, Shenzhen, China, Category XXI (2766)
	Player	Rating	1	2	3	4	5	6	Points	TPR
1	Maxime Vachier-Lagrave (France)	2778		½ ½	½ 1	½ ½	½ ½	½ ½	5½	2799
2	Anish Giri (Netherlands)	2780	½ ½		½ ½	½ ½	½ ½	½ 1	5½	2799
3	Ding Liren (China)	2816	½ 0	½ ½		½ 1	½ ½	1 ½	5½	2792
4	Yu Yangyi (China)	2764	½ ½	½ ½	½ 0		1 ½	½ ½	5	2766
5	Nikita Vitiugov (Russia)	2709	½ ½	½ ½	½ ½	0 ½		½ 1	5	2777
6	Radosław Wojtaszek (Poland)	2749	½ ½	½ 0	0 ½	½ ½	½ 0		3½	2659

=== 2019 ===
3rd Du Te Cup, 17–26 April 2019, Shenzhen, China, Category XXI (2754)
	Player	Rating	1	2	3	4	5	6	Points	H2H	SB	TPR
1	Anish Giri (Netherlands)	2797		1 ½	½ ½	½ ½	½ 1	½ 1	6½			2856
2	Pentala Harikrishna (India)	2723	0 ½		1 0	1 0	½ 1	1 1	6			2832
3	Ding Liren (China)	2809	½ ½	0 1		½ ½	1 ½	½ ½	5½			2779
4	Richárd Rapport (Hungary)	2726	½ ½	0 1	½ ½		½ ½	½ ½	5			2760
5	Dmitry Jakovenko (Russia)	2719	½ 0	½ 0	0 ½	½ ½		½ ½	3½	1	17.50	2651
6	Yu Yangyi (China)	2751	½ 0	0 0	½ ½	½ ½	½ ½		3½	1	17.25	2645

=== 2021 ===
4th Du Te Cup, 20 April–1 May 2021, Online on chess.com
	Player	Rapid score	Blitz score	Total
1	Yu Yangyi (China)	9	3	12
2	Jan-Krzysztof Duda (Poland)	6	5	11
3	Richárd Rapport (Hungary)	6	2½	8½
4	Wei Yi (China)	3	1½	4½

=== 2024 ===
The 2024 event took place at the Longgang Training Center in Longgang, Shenzhen, China. The prize fund was $90,000. The time control was 90 minutes for the first 40 moves followed by 30 minutes for the rest of the game, with a 30-second increment from move one.

Shenzhen Longgang Chess Masters, 29 February–7 March 2024, Shenzhen, China
	Player	Rating	1	2	3	4	5	6	7	8	Points
1	Bu Xiangzhi (China)	2671		½	1	½	½	½	1	½	4½
2	Yu Yangyi (China)	2720	½		½	1	½	1	½	½	4½
3	Arjun Erigaisi (India)	2738	0	½		1	½	½	1	1	4½
4	Xu Xiangyu (China)	2623	½	0	0		1	½	½	1	3½
5	Daniil Dubov (FIDE)	2708	½	½	½	0		½	1	½	3½
6	Vladislav Artemiev (FIDE)	2711	½	0	½	½	½		0	1	3
7	Anish Giri (Netherlands)	2762	0	½	0	½	0	1		½	2½
8	Ma Qun (China)	2651	½	½	0	0	½	0	½		2

=== 2025 ===
In 2025, the tournament was held in Nanshan district, Shenzhen, China, and used knockout format with rapid time control. Ding Liren won the tournament by defeating Wang Hao in the finals.

Round 1
1	(China) Ding Liren
(Bye)
5	(China) Bu Xiangzhi	2½
4	(China) Ma Qun	1½
11	(China) Zhao Xue
(Bye)
12	(China) Jiang Haochen	3½
6	(China) Bai Jinshi	2½
2	(China) Wang Hao
(Bye)
8	(China) Zhang Pengxiang	3½
7	(China) Ju Wenjun	2½
3	(China) Lu Shanglei
(Bye)
10	(China) Xiao Tong	3½
9	(China) Zeng Chongsheng	2½

Quarterfinals
1	(China) Ding Liren	2½
5	(China) Bu Xiangzhi	1½
11	(China) Zhao Xue	0
12	(China) Jiang Haochen	3
2	(China) Wang Hao	3
8	(China) Zhang Pengxiang	1
3	(China) Lu Shanglei	3
10	(China) Xiao Tong	0

Semifinals
1	(China) Ding Liren	3
12	(China) Jiang Haochen	1
2	(China) Wang Hao	2½
3	(China) Lu Shanglei	1½

Final
1	(China) Ding Liren	2½
2	(China) Wang Hao	1½
Third place
12	(China) Jiang Haochen	2½
3	(China) Lu Shanglei	1½

=== 2026 ===
The 2026 Shenzhen Nanshan Masters will be held from 7th to 13th October 2026.The knockout bracket is as follows:

Preliminaries
1	(China) Ding Liren
16	(Bye)
8	(China) Meng Yihan	3
9	(China) Yan Tianqi	0
5	(China) Peng Xiongjian	1½
12	(China) Kong Xiangrui	2½
4	(China) Xu Xiangyu
13	(Bye)
6	(China) Yu Yangyi
11	(Bye)
3	(China) Huang Renjie	3
14	(China) Zhu Jiner	0
7	(China) Jiang Haochen	½
10	(China) Xiao Tong	2½
2	(China) Wang Hao
15	(Bye)

Quarterfinals
(China) Ding Liren	3
(China) Meng Yihan	1
(China) Kong Xiangrui	3½
(China) Xu Xiangyu	2½
(China) Yu Yangyi	2½
(China) Huang Renjie	½
(China) Xiao Tong	1½
(China) Wang Hao	2½

Semifinals
(China) Ding Liren	2½
(China) Kong Xiangrui	½
(China) Yu Yangyi	3
(China) Wang Hao	1

Final
(China) Ding Liren	3
(China) Yu Yangyi	4
Third place
(China) Kong Xiangrui	1.5
(China) Wang Hao	2.5

== See also ==
- List of strong chess tournaments
