= Grenke Chess Festival =

Annual chess tournament in Germany

Grenke Chess Classic
- Logo in 2024

Tournament information
- Sport: Chess
- Location: Baden-Baden, Germany
- Established: 2013
- Defunct: 2024
- Format: Round-robin tournament
- Most championships: (Norway) Magnus Carlsen (3)

Final champion
- (Norway) Magnus Carlsen

The Grenke Chess Festival is an annual chess event held in the German cities of Karlsruhe and Baden-Baden and sponsored by Grenke AG. The Grenke Chess Classic was a strong closed tournament first held in 2013, which featured many of the world's top players. Since 2016, an Open tournament has been held concurrently, with the winner qualifying for the subsequent Classic tournament. In 2020, the Festival was cancelled due to the COVID-19 pandemic. It returned in 2024 after a five-year hiatus, with the Classic tournament featuring a new rapid time control (45+10). In 2025, the Classic tournament was discontinued, and a new Grenke Freestyle Chess Open was announced in partnership with the Freestyle Chess Grand Slam Tour. In 2026, the Freestyle Open became a qualification path for the FIDE Freestyle Chess World Championship, following the discontinuation of the Grand Slam Tour.

== Winners ==
| # | Year | Classic | Open | Freestyle Open |
|---|---|---|---|---|
| 1 | 2013 | Viswanathan Anand (India) | — | — |
| 2 | 2014 | Arkadij Naiditsch (Germany) | — | — |
| 3 | 2015 | Magnus Carlsen (Norway) | — | — |
| 4 | 2016 | Not held. | Matthias Blübaum (Germany) | — |
| 5 | 2017 | Levon Aronian (Armenia) | Nikita Vitiugov (Russia) | — |
| 6 | 2018 | Fabiano Caruana (United States) | Vincent Keymer (Germany) | — |
| 7 | 2019 | Magnus Carlsen (Norway) | Daniel Fridman (Germany) | — |
| – | 2020–2023 | Cancelled due to the COVID-19 pandemic. | | — |
| 8 | 2024 | Magnus Carlsen (Norway) | Hans Niemann (United States) | — |
| 9 | 2025 | — | Aswath S (India) | Magnus Carlsen (Norway) |
| 10 | 2026 | — | Mukhammadzokhid Suyarov (Uzbekistan) | Vincent Keymer (Germany) |

== Editions ==
=== 2013 ===
==== Classic ====
Six players participated in the first edition of Grenke Chess. The winner was Viswanathan Anand ahead of Fabiano Caruana; they scored 6.5 and 6 out of 10, respectively.

1st Grenke Chess Classic, 7–17 February 2013, Baden-Baden, Germany, Category XIX (2714)
| | Player | Rating | 1 | 2 | 3 | 4 | 5 | 6 | Total | Wins | TPR |
|---|---|---|---|---|---|---|---|---|---|---|---|
| 1 | Viswanathan Anand (India) | 2780 | | ½ ½ | ½ ½ | ½ ½ | 1 1 | ½ 1 | 6½ | | 2811 |
| 2 | Fabiano Caruana (Italy) | 2757 | ½ ½ | | 1 ½ | ½ 0 | 1 1 | ½ ½ | 6 | | 2778 |
| 3 | Georg Meier (Germany) | 2640 | ½ ½ | 0 ½ | | ½ ½ | 0 1 | ½ 1 | 5 | 2 | 2729 |
| 4 | Michael Adams (England) | 2725 | ½ ½ | ½ 1 | ½ ½ | | 0 ½ | ½ ½ | 5 | 1 | 2712 |
| 5 | Arkadij Naiditsch (Germany) | 2716 | 0 0 | 0 0 | 1 0 | 1 ½ | | ½ 1 | 4 | | 2642 |
| 6 | Daniel Fridman (Germany) | 2667 | ½ 0 | ½ ½ | ½ 0 | ½ ½ | ½ 0 | | 3½ | | 2614 |

=== 2014 ===
==== Classic ====
Arkadij Naiditsch, the highest-rated German chess player, won the 2014 edition of Grenke Chess Classic ahead of David Baramidze. This edition was not a supertournament, but rather a national competition; all eight participants were German. It was a single Round-robin tournament, and two spots were provided for the players to win entry into the next edition of 2015.

2nd Grenke Chess Classic, 6–12 September 2014, Baden-Baden, Baden-Württemberg, Germany, Category XV (2609)
| | Player | Title | Club | Rating | 1 | 2 | 3 | 4 | 5 | 6 | 7 | 8 | Total | Wins | Black | H2H | TPR |
|---|---|---|---|---|---|---|---|---|---|---|---|---|---|---|---|---|---|
| 1 | Arkadij Naiditsch (Germany) | GM | OSG Baden-Baden | 2715 | | ½ | ½ | 1 | 0 | 1 | 1 | 1 | 5 | | | | 2752 |
| 2 | David Baramidze (Germany) | GM | SV Hockenheim | 2599 | ½ | | 0 | 1 | ½ | ½ | 1 | ½ | 4 | 2 | | | 2661 |
| 3 | Daniel Fridman (Germany) | GM | Mülheim-Nord 1931 | 2633 | ½ | 1 | | ½ | ½ | ½ | ½ | ½ | 4 | 1 | | | 2656 |
| 4 | Liviu-Dieter Nisipeanu (Germany) | GM | OSG Baden-Baden | 2672 | 0 | 0 | ½ | | 1 | ½ | 1 | ½ | 3½ | 2 | 0 | 1 | 2600 |
| 5 | Matthias Blübaum (Germany) | IM | SV Werder Bremen | 2521 | 1 | ½ | ½ | 0 | | 0 | ½ | 1 | 3½ | 2 | 0 | 0 | 2622 |
| 6 | Georg Meier (Germany) | GM | OSG Baden-Baden | 2652 | 0 | ½ | ½ | ½ | 1 | | ½ | ½ | 3½ | 1 | | | 2603 |
| 7 | Dennis Wagner (Germany) | IM | SV Hockenheim | 2499 | 0 | 0 | ½ | 0 | ½ | ½ | | 1 | 2½ | | | | 2523 |
| 8 | Philipp Schlosser (Germany) | GM | OSG Baden-Baden | 2582 | 0 | ½ | ½ | ½ | 0 | ½ | 0 | | 2 | | | | 2455 |

=== 2015 ===
==== Classic ====
The tournament was played between 2–9 February 2015. With an average rating of 2752, it was the strongest edition of Grenke Chess in its history. Among the participants were Magnus Carlsen, Fabiano Caruana, Viswanathan Anand and Levon Aronian. The winner was Magnus Carlsen, who eventually won a five-game tiebreak with Arkadij Naiditsch with a score of 3–2 (two rapid, two blitz and one armageddon game).

3rd Grenke Chess Classic, 2–9 February 2015, Baden-Baden, Germany, Category XX (2750)
| | Player | Rating | 1 | 2 | 3 | 4 | 5 | 6 | 7 | 8 | Total | TB | Wins | TPR |
|---|---|---|---|---|---|---|---|---|---|---|---|---|---|---|
| 1 | Magnus Carlsen (Norway) | 2865 | | 0 | 1 | ½ | ½ | ½ | 1 | 1 | 4½ | 3 | | 2835 |
| 2 | Arkadij Naiditsch (Germany) | 2706 | 1 | | ½ | ½ | ½ | ½ | ½ | 1 | 4½ | 2 | | 2858 |
| 3 | Michael Adams (England) | 2738 | 0 | ½ | | ½ | ½ | ½ | 1 | 1 | 4 | | 2 | 2802 |
| 4 | Fabiano Caruana (Italy) | 2811 | ½ | ½ | ½ | | 1 | ½ | ½ | ½ | 4 | | 1 | 2791 |
| 5 | Levon Aronian (Armenia) | 2777 | ½ | ½ | ½ | 0 | | ½ | 1 | ½ | 3½ | | 1 | 2746 |
| 6 | Étienne Bacrot (France) | 2711 | ½ | ½ | ½ | ½ | ½ | | ½ | ½ | 3½ | | 0 | 2755 |
| 7 | Viswanathan Anand (India) | 2797 | 0 | ½ | 0 | ½ | 0 | ½ | | 1 | 2½ | | | 2641 |
| 8 | David Baramidze (Germany) | 2594 | 0 | 0 | 0 | ½ | ½ | ½ | 0 | | 1½ | | | 2544 |

Notes

- Final rapid/blitz/armageddon tie-break: Magnus Carlsen def. Arkadij Naiditsch, 3–2.
- FIDE Ratings as of February 2015.

=== 2016 ===
==== Open ====
The 2016 open tournament (section A) was won by Matthias Blübaum with a score of 7½/9. Blübaum thus qualified for the Grenke Chess Classic 2017.

=== 2017 ===
==== Classic ====
The 2017 tournament took place from 15 to 22 April in Karlsruhe and Baden-Baden.

4th Grenke Chess Classic, 15–22 April 2017, Karlsruhe — Baden-Baden, Germany, Category XX (2730)
| | Player | Rating | 1 | 2 | 3 | 4 | 5 | 6 | 7 | 8 | Total | Wins | Black | H2H | TPR |
|---|---|---|---|---|---|---|---|---|---|---|---|---|---|---|---|
| 1 | Levon Aronian (Armenia) | 2774 | | ½ | ½ | 1 | 1 | 1 | 1 | ½ | 5½ | 4 | | | 2953 |
| 2 | Fabiano Caruana (United States) | 2817 | ½ | | ½ | 1 | 0 | ½ | ½ | 1 | 4 | 2 | | | 2767 |
| 3 | Magnus Carlsen (Norway) | 2838 | ½ | ½ | | ½ | ½ | ½ | ½ | 1 | 4 | 1 | | | 2764 |
| 4 | Arkadij Naiditsch (Azerbaijan) | 2702 | 0 | 0 | ½ | | ½ | 1 | 1 | ½ | 3½ | 2 | 2 | | 2733 |
| 5 | Hou Yifan (China) | 2649 | 0 | 1 | ½ | ½ | | 0 | ½ | 1 | 3½ | 2 | 1 | | 2741 |
| 6 | Maxime Vachier-Lagrave (France) | 2803 | 0 | ½ | ½ | 0 | 1 | | 1 | ½ | 3½ | 2 | 0 | | 2719 |
| 7 | Matthias Blübaum (Germany) | 2634 | 0 | ½ | ½ | 0 | ½ | 0 | | ½ | 2 | 0 | 0 | ½ | 2585 |
| 8 | Georg Meier (Germany) | 2621 | ½ | 0 | 0 | ½ | 0 | ½ | ½ | | 2 | 0 | 0 | ½ | 2587 |

==== Open ====
The 2017 open tournament (section A) was won by Nikita Vitiugov with a score of 7½/9. He thus qualified for the Grenke Chess Classic 2018.

=== 2018 ===
==== Classic ====
5th Grenke Chess Classic, 31 March – 9 April 2018, Karlsruhe — Baden-Baden, Germany, Category XX (2736)
| | Player | Rating | 1 | 2 | 3 | 4 | 5 | 6 | 7 | 8 | 9 | 10 | Total | Wins | Black | H2H | TPR |
|---|---|---|---|---|---|---|---|---|---|---|---|---|---|---|---|---|---|
| 1 | Fabiano Caruana (United States) | 2784 | | ½ | 1 | 1 | ½ | ½ | 1 | ½ | ½ | 1 | 6½ | 4 | 3 | | 2896 |
| 2 | Magnus Carlsen (Norway) | 2843 | ½ | | ½ | ½ | ½ | ½ | 1 | ½ | 1 | ½ | 5½ | 2 | 1 | | 2803 |
| 3 | Maxime Vachier-Lagrave (France) | 2789 | 0 | ½ | | ½ | ½ | ½ | ½ | 1 | 1 | ½ | 5 | 2 | 1 | ½ | 2772 |
| 4 | Nikita Vitiugov (Russia) | 2735 | 0 | ½ | ½ | | ½ | 1 | ½ | ½ | ½ | 1 | 5 | 2 | 1 | ½ | 2778 |
| 5 | Levon Aronian (Armenia) | 2794 | ½ | ½ | ½ | ½ | | ½ | 1 | ½ | ½ | ½ | 5 | 1 | 0 | | 2772 |
| 6 | Matthias Blübaum (Germany) | 2631 | ½ | ½ | ½ | 0 | ½ | | ½ | 1 | ½ | ½ | 4½ | 1 | 0 | | 2747 |
| 7 | Arkadij Naiditsch (Azerbaijan) | 2701 | 0 | 0 | ½ | ½ | 0 | ½ | | ½ | ½ | 1 | 3½ | 1 | 1 | | 2659 |
| 8 | Viswanathan Anand (India) | 2776 | ½ | ½ | 0 | ½ | ½ | 0 | ½ | | ½ | ½ | 3½ | 0 | 0 | ½ | 2651 |
| 9 | Hou Yifan (China) | 2654 | ½ | 0 | 0 | ½ | ½ | ½ | ½ | ½ | | ½ | 3½ | 0 | 0 | ½ | 2664 |
| 10 | Georg Meier (Germany) | 2648 | 0 | ½ | ½ | 0 | ½ | ½ | 0 | ½ | ½ | | 3 | 0 | 0 | | 2620 |

The tiebreaks were as follows: 1) number of wins; 2) number of black wins; 3) head-to-head.

==== Open ====
The 2018 open tournament (section A) was won by 13-year-old IM Vincent Keymer with a score of 8/9, who also achieved a grandmaster norm in the process. He thus qualified for the Grenke Chess Classic 2019.

=== 2019 ===
==== Classic ====
6th Grenke Chess Classic, 20–29 April 2019, Karlsruhe — Baden-Baden, Germany, Category XIX (2724)
| | Player | Rating | 1 | 2 | 3 | 4 | 5 | 6 | 7 | 8 | 9 | 10 | Total | Wins | Black | H2H | TPR |
|---|---|---|---|---|---|---|---|---|---|---|---|---|---|---|---|---|---|
| 1 | Magnus Carlsen (Norway) | 2845 | | ½ | ½ | 1 | 1 | ½ | 1 | 1 | 1 | 1 | 7½ | | | | 2983 |
| 2 | Fabiano Caruana (United States) | 2819 | ½ | | 1 | ½ | ½ | ½ | ½ | ½ | 1 | 1 | 6 | | | | 2838 |
| 3 | Arkadij Naiditsch (Azerbaijan) | 2695 | ½ | 0 | | ½ | 0 | 1 | ½ | ½ | 1 | 1 | 5 | 3 | | | 2770 |
| 4 | Maxime Vachier-Lagrave (France) | 2773 | 0 | ½ | ½ | | ½ | ½ | ½ | ½ | 1 | 1 | 5 | 2 | | | 2761 |
| 5 | Peter Svidler (Russia) | 2735 | 0 | ½ | 1 | ½ | | ½ | 0 | ½ | 1 | ½ | 4½ | 2 | 1 | ½ | 2722 |
| 6 | Viswanathan Anand (India) | 2774 | ½ | ½ | 0 | ½ | ½ | | ½ | 1 | 0 | 1 | 4½ | 2 | 1 | ½ | 2718 |
| 7 | Levon Aronian (Armenia) | 2763 | 0 | ½ | ½ | ½ | 1 | ½ | | ½ | ½ | ½ | 4½ | 1 | | | 2719 |
| 8 | Francisco Vallejo Pons (Spain) | 2693 | 0 | ½ | ½ | ½ | ½ | 0 | ½ | | ½ | 1 | 4 | | | | 2693 |
| 9 | Georg Meier (Germany) | 2628 | 0 | 0 | 0 | 0 | 0 | 1 | ½ | ½ | | 0 | 2 | 1 | 1 | | 2514 |
| 10 | Vincent Keymer (Germany) | 2516 | 0 | 0 | 0 | 0 | ½ | 0 | ½ | 0 | 1 | | 2 | 1 | 0 | | 2527 |

==== Open ====
The 2019 open tournament (section A) was won by Daniel Fridman with a score of 7½/9. Fridman thus qualified for the next edition of the Grenke Chess Classic, which wasn't held until 2024.

=== 2020–2023 ===
The 2020 edition was cancelled on short notice due to COVID-19 pandemic, which continued to prevent the event from being held in subsequent years until 2024.

=== 2024 ===
==== Classic ====
The tournament returned in 2024 after a five-year hiatus. For the first time, the tournament was played in a rapid time control (45+10) instead of the former classical time control. The format was also changed into a double round-robin tournament (2 games with reversed colors against each player), followed by playoffs to decide places 1, 3 and 5. Magnus Carlsen won the tournament.

7th Grenke Chess Classic, 26–31 March 2024, Karlsruhe — Baden-Baden, Cat. XIX (2724)
| | Player | Rating | 1 | 2 | 3 | 4 | 5 | 6 | Total |
|---|---|---|---|---|---|---|---|---|---|
| 1 | Magnus Carlsen (Norway) | 2823 | | 0 1 | ½ ½ | 1 1 | ½ ½ | 1 1 | 7 |
| 2 | Richárd Rapport (Hungary) | 2708 | 1 0 | | 0 ½ | ½ 1 | ½ 1 | 1 ½ | 6 |
| 3 | Maxime Vachier-Lagrave (France) | 2755 | ½ ½ | 1 ½ | | ½ ½ | ½ ½ | 0 ½ | 5 |
| 4 | Vincent Keymer (Germany) | 2627 | 0 0 | ½ 0 | ½ ½ | | ½ 1 | ½ ½ | 4 |
| 5 | Ding Liren (China) | 2818 | ½ ½ | ½ 0 | ½ ½ | ½ 0 | | ½ ½ | 4 |
| 6 | Daniel Fridman (Germany) | 2575 | 0 0 | 0 ½ | 1 ½ | ½ ½ | ½ ½ | | 4 |

4th-place tiebreaker
| | Player | Rating | 1 | 2 | 3 | Total |
|---|---|---|---|---|---|---|
| 4 | Vincent Keymer (Germany) | 2627 | | ½ 1 | 1 - | 2.5 |
| 5 | Ding Liren (China) | 2818 | ½ 0 | | 0 1 | 1.5 |
| 6 | Daniel Fridman (Germany) | 2575 | 0 - | 1 0 | | 1 |

Match for 5th place
| | Player | Rating | 1 | 2 | Total |
|---|---|---|---|---|---|
| 5 | Ding Liren (China) | 2818 | 1 | ½ | 1.5 |
| 6 | Daniel Fridman (Germany) | 2575 | 0 | ½ | 0.5 |

Match for 3rd place
| | Player | Rating | 1 | 2 | B1 | B2 | Total |
|---|---|---|---|---|---|---|---|
| 3 | Maxime Vachier-Lagrave (France) | 2755 | ½ | ½ | ½ | 1 | 2.5 |
| 4 | Vincent Keymer (Germany) | 2627 | ½ | ½ | ½ | 0 | 1.5 |

Match for 1st place
| | Player | Rating | 1 | 2 | Total |
|---|---|---|---|---|---|
| 1 | Magnus Carlsen (Norway) | 2823 | 1 | ½ | 1.5 |
| 2 | Richárd Rapport (Hungary) | 2708 | 0 | ½ | 0.5 |

==== Open ====
The 2024 open tournament (section A) was won by Hans Niemann with a score of 8/9. Niemann thus qualified for the Grenke Chess Classic 2025. Since that edition was cancelled following the announcement of a new Freestyle open, he was invited to the Paris Freestyle Chess Grand Slam to compensate for the lost invite. However, he later withdrew from that event due to personal reasons.

=== 2025 ===
==== Freestyle Open ====
The 2025 Freestyle (Chess960) open tournament (section A) was won by Magnus Carlsen with a perfect score of 9/9. Parham Maghsoodloo finished second on tiebreaks and qualified for the Las Vegas Freestyle Chess Grand Slam, since Carlsen had already qualified.

==== Open ====
The 2025 regular open tournament (section A) was won by 17-year-old IM Aswath S with a score of 8/9, who earned his maiden grandmaster norm in the process.

=== 2026 ===
==== Freestyle Open ====
The 2026 Freestyle (Chess960) open tournament (section A) was won by Vincent Keymer on tiebreaks who had scored 7½/9 and tied for first place with Maxime Vachier-Lagrave. He qualified for the FIDE Freestyle Chess Championship 2027.

==== Open ====
The 2026 regular open tournament (section A) was won by IM Mukhammadzokhid Suyarov on tiebreaks, who had tied for first with Dominik Horvath and Zeng Chongsheng on 8/9.
