= Kong Xiangrui (chess player) =

Chinese chess grandmaster (born 2009)

- Kong at the 2026 Chess Olympiad

Personal information
- Born: October 2009 (age 17) Qingdao, Shandong, China

Chess career
- Country: China
- Title: Grandmaster (2026)
- FIDE rating: 2553 (November 2026)
- Peak rating: 2553 (October 2026)

Kong Xiangrui (Chinese: 孔祥睿) is a Chinese chess grandmaster.

== Chess career ==
In May 2026, he finished in second place in the Chinese Chess Championship. He had entered the final round tied for first place with Xu Xiangyu, but he drew his game against Lou Yiping while Xu won against Li Di. With a 2604 performance rating, he earned his first Grandmaster norm.

In June 2026, he tied for first place with Xiao Tong, Zhamsaran Tsydypov, and Savva Vetokhin in the Asian Individual Chess Championship, but had the best tiebreak score and won the championship. He was awarded the Grandmaster title for this achievement and was selected for the Chinese national team for the 46th Chess Olympiad.
