= Phạm Trần Gia Phúc =

Vietnamese chess player (born 2009)

Personal information
- Born: August 21, 2009 (age 17) Ho Chi Minh City, Vietnam

Chess career
- Country: Vietnam
- Title: International Master (2024)
- FIDE rating: 2424 (September 2026)
- Peak rating: 2465 (October 2025)

Phạm Trần Gia Phúc is a Vietnamese chess player.

== Chess career ==
Phúc was diagnosed with autism at a young age, and became interested in chess after watching his sister play. Due to his condition, he was rejected by chess clubs, causing his mother to invite a coach to train him at home. Within six months, he competed in a Ho Chi Minh City open tournament and won with a perfect score in the U6 category.

In June 2017, he won the U8 World Youth Rapid Championship, beating Savva Vetokhin on tiebreak scores.

In May 2024, he won the Quảng Ninh Masters Tournament, scoring his second GM norm.

In January 2026, he won the Grandmaster section of the Hanoi Masters Tournament.
