= Savva Vetokhin =

Russian chess grandmaster (born 2009)

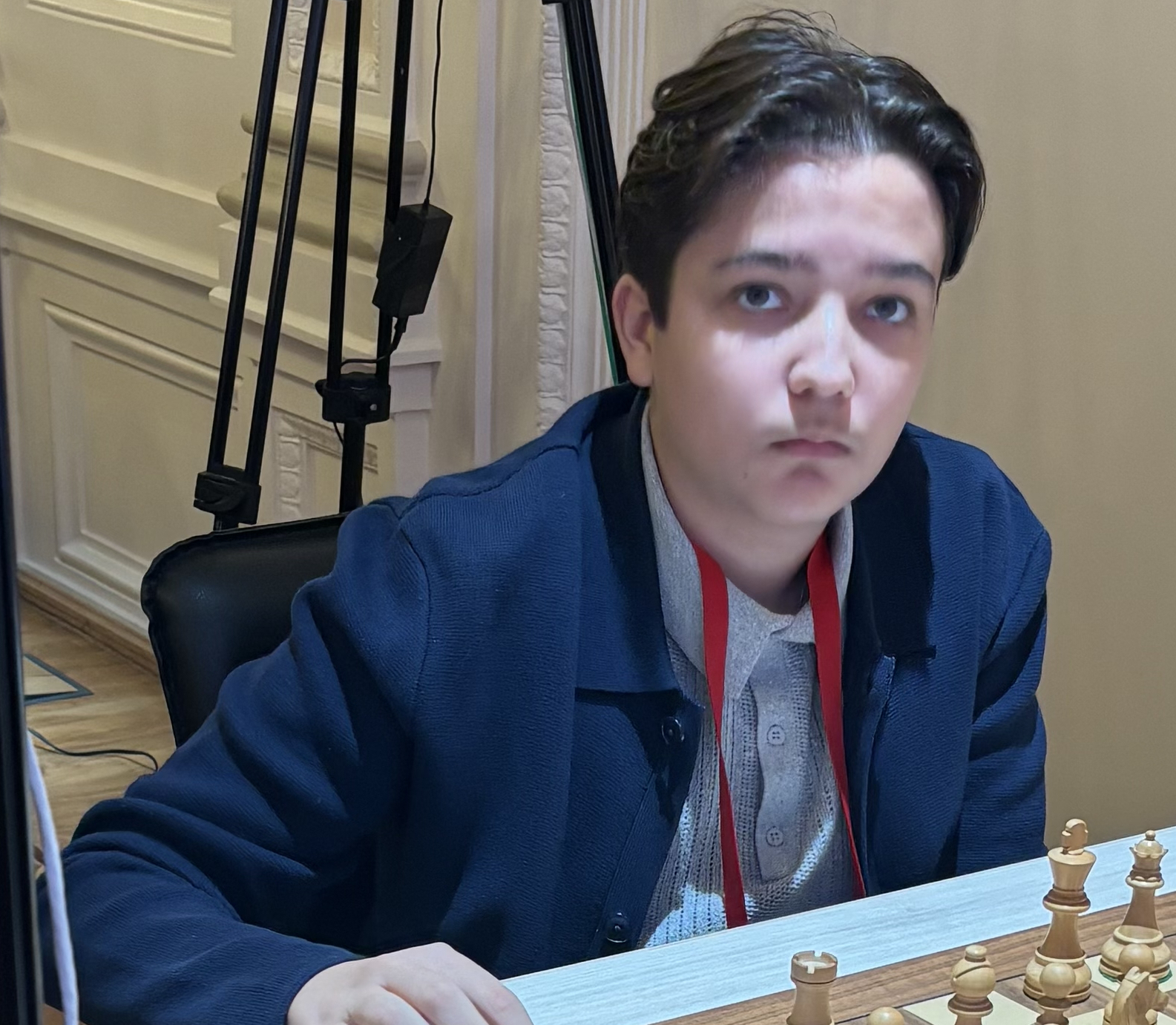
- Vetokhin in 2025

Personal information
- Born: February 9, 2009 (age 17) Moscow, Russia

Chess career
- Country: Russia (until 2023); FIDE (since 2023)
- Title: Grandmaster (2024)
- FIDE rating: 2561 (July 2026)
- Peak rating: 2572 (November 2025)

Savva Dmitrievich Vetokhin (born February 9, 2009) is a Russian chess grandmaster.

== Chess career ==
In May 2017, he played in the Russian U9 Championship, where he co-led the tournament alongside Egor Koshulyan with a perfect score after 6 rounds.

In June 2017, he won the silver medal in the U8 World Youth Rapid Championship, losing on tiebreaks to Phạm Trần Gia Phúc.

In September 2019, he became the U10 World Youth Champion, finishing half a point ahead of runners-up Meng Yihan and Wei Jianzhou.

In June 2023, he won the U14 World Youth Blitz Championship ahead of runner-up Artem Uskov.

In December 2024, he won the Sunway Sitges Chess Festival by defeating grandmaster Ido Gorshtein in the blitz playoff. He also went undefeated throughout the tournament, winning against grandmasters Kirill Alekseenko and Marc'Andria Maurizzi along the way.
