= Vincent Keymer =

German chess grandmaster (born 2004)

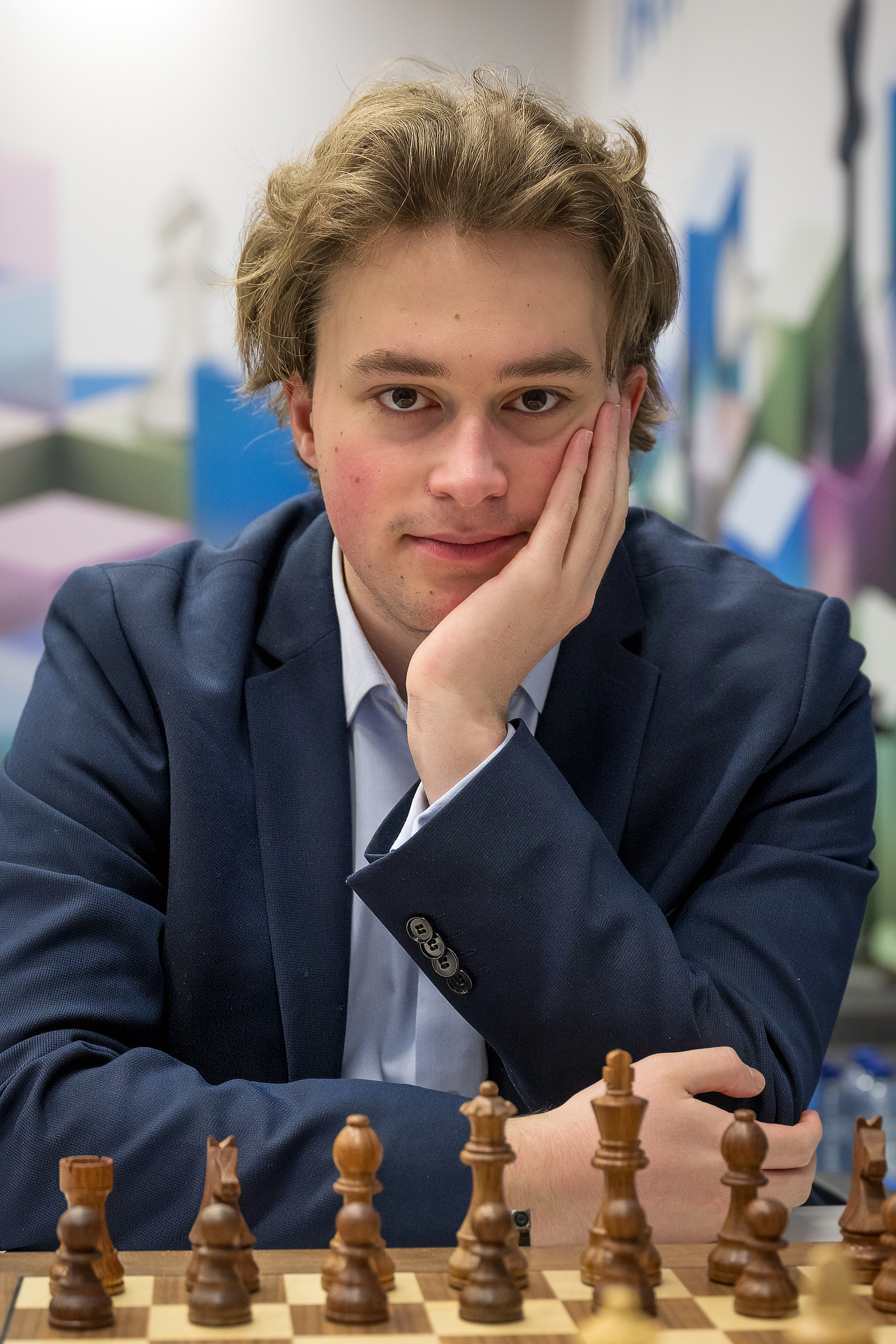
- Keymer in 2025

Personal information
- Born: 15 November 2004 (age 22) Mainz, Germany

Chess career
- Country: Germany
- Title: Grandmaster (2020)
- FIDE rating: 2761 (November 2026)
- Peak rating: 2776 (December 2025)
- Ranking: No. 9 (November 2026)
- Peak ranking: No. 4 (November 2025)

Vincent Keymer (born 15 November 2004) is a German chess grandmaster. He is the highest rated German player and is consistently ranked in World Top 10. He was the No.1 in the FIDE World Chess Ratings for Juniors in January 2024.

== Chess career ==
=== Beginnings ===
Vincent Keymer was born in Mainz, Germany, a city that has hosted rapid tournaments and Chess960 tournaments for many years. He was born into a musical family—his father, Christof Keymer, is a concert pianist and a professor of music at Leibniz University Hannover, while his mother, Heike, is a cellist in an orchestra. Keymer began piano lessons at a young age, and was taught to play chess by his parents at the age of five.

In 2015 and 2017 Keymer became European champion with the German U18 national chess team.

When he was ten, Keymer was on the September 2015 cover of the German chess magazine Schach Magazin, hailed as Germany's greatest talent since Emanuel Lasker. Garry Kasparov in 2016 referred to Keymer as "exceptional", and Keymer at 11 demonstrated his potential with an "impressive second prize" in a strong field in the Vienna Open tournament.

In July 2017, Keymer obtained the third and final norm required for the title of International Master.

He has been coached by Peter Leko of Hungary, who was himself once considered "the world's most promising prodigy".

From 29 March to 2 April 2018, Keymer played in the A group of the Grenke Chess Open as 99th seed. He won the tournament ahead of 49 grandmasters, including four grandmasters with Elo ratings above 2700, scoring 8/9 and achieving his first norm for the title of Grandmaster at age 13. He earned one-and-a-half more points than required for the GM norm. Leonard Barden noted that Keymer's performance rating (2798) was the highest in history by an under-14 player, and The Week in Chess said Keymer's performance was "one of the most sensational results of all time."

From 10 October through 21 October 2019, Keymer played in the 2019 FIDE Grand Swiss Tournament, scoring 4½/11 (+1−3=7). This performance earned him his third and final norm required for the title of Grandmaster, making him the youngest German ever to achieve this feat. This title was approved by FIDE in early 2020. Keymer said in an interview with Fiona Steil-Antoni that his third grandmaster norm "should have come sooner".

Keymer finished in fifth place in the 2021 FIDE Grand Swiss tournament.

=== 2022–2023 ===
Through February and March, Keymer played in the FIDE Grand Prix 2022. In the first leg, he placed fourth in Pool C with a 1.5/6 result. In the third leg, he tied for first with Shakhriyar Mamedyarov in Pool B with a result of 3.5/6, eventually losing 1/4 in rapid and blitz tiebreakers. He tied for 16th in the standings with 4 points.

In June, Keymer won the Challengers section of Prague Chess Festival 2022 by defeating Hans Niemann in first place playoff, as they both scored 6½ in the Classical section. As a result, Keymer qualified for the tournament's Masters section next year.

In December, he finished the World Rapid Chess Championship 2022 as runner-up with the score of 9½/10, defeating challengers Fabiano Caruana and Ian Nepomniachtchi.

=== 2024 ===
In February, Keymer won the Chessable Masters Division II, part of that year's Champions Chess Tour. In August, he won the Akiba Rubinstein Festival.

In September, he played board 1 for Germany at the 45th Chess Olympiad, where they finished seventh.

He worked as part of Gukesh Dommaraju's team of seconds for the World Chess Championship 2024, helping Gukesh win the match against Ding Liren.

=== 2025 ===
In February, Keymer won the Weissenhaus Freestyle Chess Grand Slam, the first leg of the Freestyle Chess Grand Slam Tour, after defeating Magnus Carlsen in the semifinals and Fabiano Caruana in the final match.

In May, he won the German Championship for the first time in his career, scoring (+6-1=2).

In July, Keymer participated in the Freestyle Chess Grand Slam Las Vegas. In his group stage, Keymer came in 7th out of 8th, with a score of 3/7, missing out on the top four requirement to advance to the Winners Bracket of the Knockout stage. In the Losers Bracket Knockout stage, Keymer eliminated Ray Robson in round 1 before being eliminated himself by Praggnanandhaa in the Quarter Finals, leaving Keymer to come in joint 9-12th place overall.

In August, he won Chennai Grand Masters with a round to spare and a 7/9 score (+5-0=4), two points ahead of Anish Giri, Arjun Erigaisi and Karthikeyan Murali. He also climbed into the World's Top Ten for the first time.

In September, he almost qualified for the Candidates Tournament 2026 after achieving a winning endgame against a fellow countryman, Matthias Blübaum, in the second to last round of the FIDE Grand Swiss Tournament 2025. However, after allowing a drawing motif, the game ended in a draw. Keymer finished in 4th place with a score of 7.5/11, missing out on both 2nd place and a candidates spot only after ARO(Average Rating of Opponents) tiebreaks.

In early December, Keymer participated in the Freestyle Chess Grand Slam Final in Cape Town, South Africa. In the group stage, Keymer finished 7th out of 8th, and was chosen by Arjun Erigaisi to be his opponent in the quarterfinals. During their quarter final match Keymer beat Erigaisi 1.5-0.5 and advanced to the semifinals. Keymer lost to Levon Aronian 3-1 in the semifinals, but successfully defeated Javokhir Sindarov 2-0 to claim a 3rd place finish.

In late December, Keymer participated in the 2025 FIDE World Rapid Chess Championship and the 2025 FIDE World Blitz Chess Championship. Keymer finished in 50th place in the World Rapid Championship with a score of 8/13. During the Open Swiss portion of the World Blitz Championship he finished in 39th with a score 12/19, and did not qualify for the finals.

=== 2026 ===
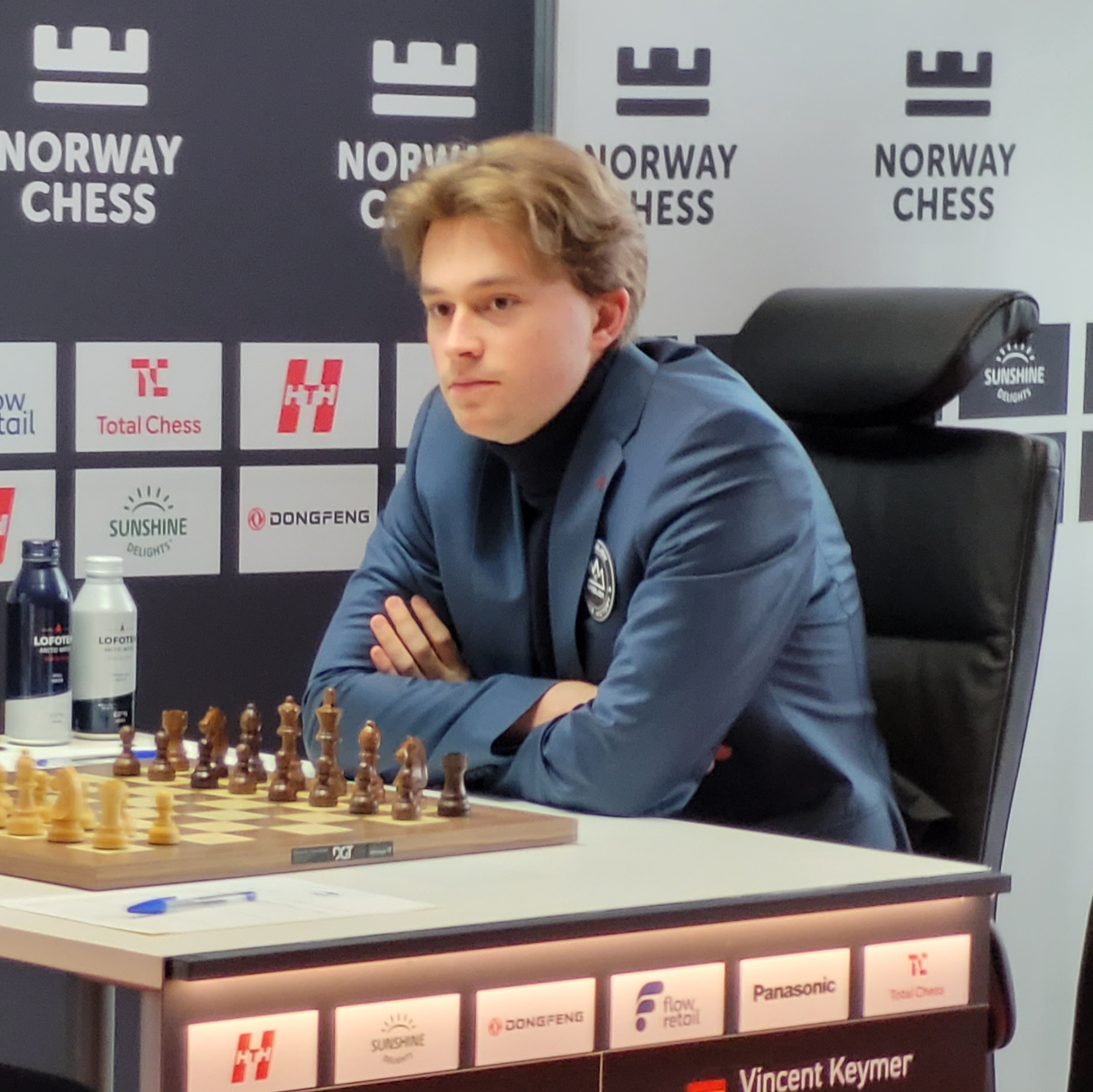
Keymer at Norway Chess 2026

Beginning in January - February, Keymer participated in the 2026 edition of the Tata Steel Chess tournament. Keymer finished in a three way tie for 3rd place, with a score of 7½/13, but officially came in 5th place after Sonneborn-Berger tiebreaks.

In mid-February, Keymer participated in the FIDE Freestyle World Chess Championship. He came 2nd in the round-robin phase with a score of 4/7, thus advancing to the knockout stage. He lost to Fabiano Caruana 2.5-1.5 in the Semifinals. In the match for 3rd place, he lost to Nodirbek Abdusattorov 2.5-1.5, leaving him with a 4th place finish.

In April, he won the Grenke Freestyle Chess Open with a score of 7½/9, edging out Maxime Vachier-Lagrave on tiebreaks, and qualified for the FIDE Freestyle Chess World Championship 2027.

In May, Keymer participated in Norway Chess, where he lost only one Classical game against Praggnanandhaa R in the final round. Keymer's only Classical win came against World Champion Gukesh Dommaraju in round 6. He lost all 8 of his Armageddon games, which meant he could only finish 5th despite having a better Classical score than 4th place Magnus Carlsen.

Keymer participated in Grand Chess Tour 2026. In May, He won Chess Classic Romania scoring 6/9 (+4-1=4) ahead of Fabiano Caruana at 5½ points. In July, He placed 5th in Super Rapid & Blitz Croatia with 10/18 points in both the Rapid and the Blitz sections. In August, He finished 9th in Saint Louis Rapid & Blitz with 9/18 points in Rapid and 5½/18 points in the Blitz Section. He then participated in the Sinquefield Cup, he needed at least an equal finish with Javokhir Sindarov to have chances to finish in top 4 of the Tour rankings and qualify for the finals, It was a tight race with both players eventually finishing on 5 points and tying for 3rd, ½ point behind top 2 Wesley So and Praggnanandhaa R. Keymer finished 4th in the Tour rankings and qualified for the Grand Finals held at the same venue, He lost in the semifinal to Praggnanandhaa with the score (19-9) and in the 4th place match to Wesley with score (18-12) to finish in 4th place.

In September, Keymer played board 1 for the German team that won bronze medal in the Open event of the 46th Chess Olympiad.

== See also ==
- Fisher Random Chess
- 2026 in chess
