= Sion Radamantys Galaviz =

Mexican chess grandmaster (born 2005)

Personal information
- Born: June 27, 2005 (age 21) Sinaloa, Mexico

Chess career
- Country: Mexico
- Title: Grandmaster (2025)
- FIDE rating: 2538 (September 2026)
- Peak rating: 2538 (September 2026)

Sion Radamantys Galaviz Medina (Note: In this Spanish name, the first or paternal surname is Galaviz and the second or maternal family name is Medina.) (born 2005) is a Mexican chess grandmaster. Born in the state of Sinaloa, he currently lives in Mérida, Yucatán.

== Chess career ==
In 2022, he took first place in the Alejandro Preve Castro Memorial tournament, finishing ahead of his brother Atlas Adomaitas.

In 2024, he won the gold medal at the CONADE National Games. He represented Mexico at the 45th Chess Olympiad in 2024 in Budapest on board one, scoring 8.5/11 and earning a Grandmaster (GM) norm.

He qualified to play in the Chess World Cup 2025. At the event, he was defeated by Luis Paulo Supi in the first round.
