= Artem Uskov =

Russian chess grandmaster (born 2010)

Personal information
- Born: 23 March 2010 (age 16) Moscow, Russia

Chess career
- Country: Russia (until 2023); FIDE (since 2023)
- Title: Grandmaster (2025)
- FIDE rating: 2506 (July 2026)
- Peak rating: 2552 (April 2026)

Artem Glebovich Uskov (Russian: Артём Глебович Усков; born 23 March 2010) is a Russian chess grandmaster.

== Chess career ==
Uskov was the youngest International Master from Russia, qualifying for the title on December 23, 2022 at the age of 12 years and 9 months. He was officially awarded the title in 2023.

In September 2022, Uskov won the U12 Open category of the FIDE World Cadet Chess Championship 2022.

In December 2022 at the World Rapid Chess Championship, Uskov was involved in a bizarre incident against Vladislav Kovalev; Uskov captured Kovalev's rook without putting his capturing piece on the correct square (due to Uskov having mere seconds remaining on his clock). Kovalev brought this up to arbiters, and they agreed to replay the move, with Uskov getting only one second to perform it. Uskov attempted to use two hands to replay the move, which is not allowed, so the move was replayed again. Uskov then failed to play the move in one second, knocking over some pieces during his attempt and giving the win to Kovalev.

In June 2023, he was the runner-up in the U14 World Youth Blitz Championship, behind winner Savva Vetokhin.

In August 2025, he was awarded the Grandmaster title, after having achieved his norms at these three events:

- Aeroflot Open in March 2024
- Budapest One Week GM-A in March 2025
- SixDays Budapest GM-A in March 2025
