= Luis Engel =

German chess grandmaster (born 2002)

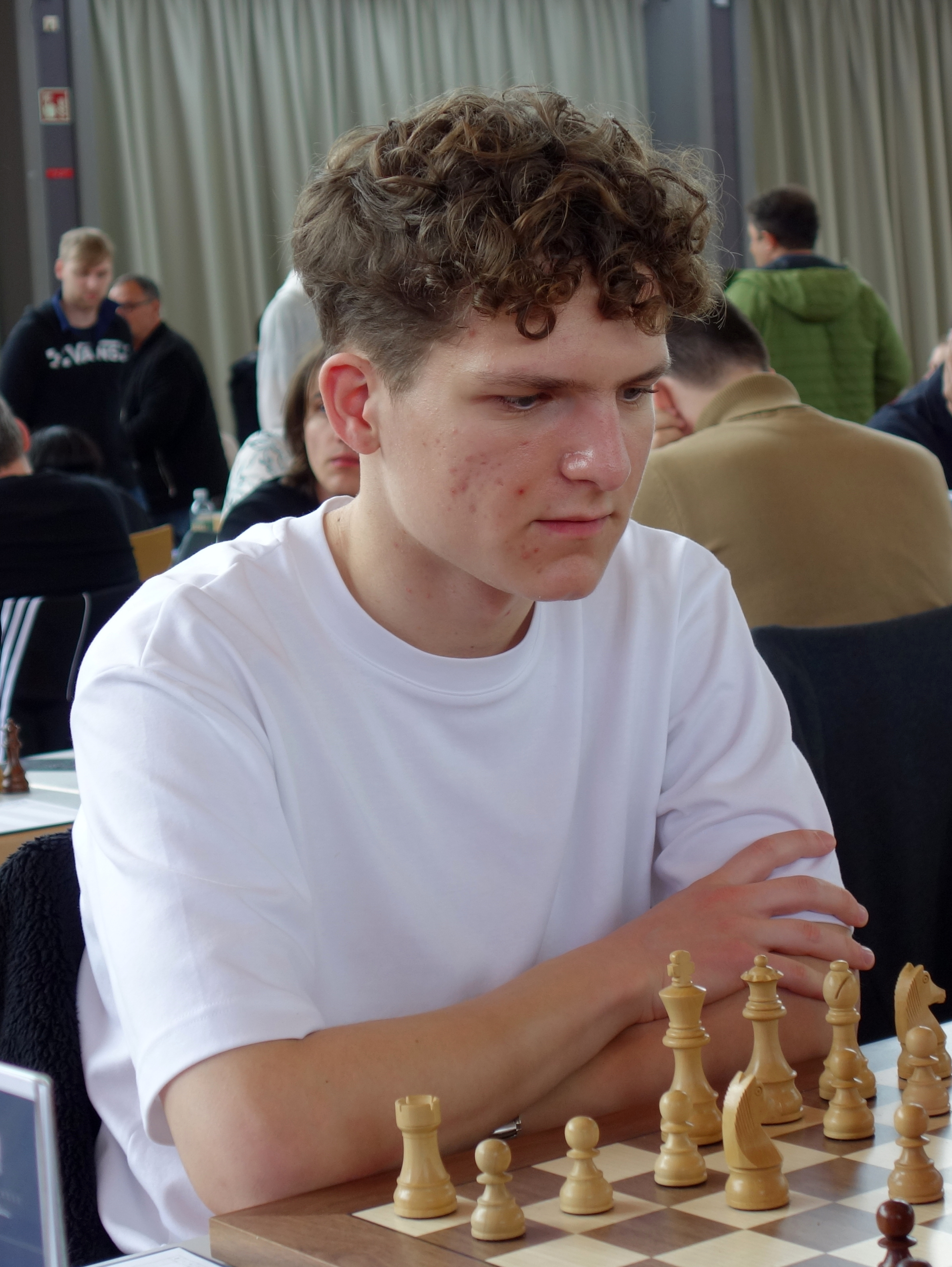
- Engel in 2024

Personal information
- Born: 14 October 2002 (age 23) Hamburg, Germany

Chess career
- Country: Germany
- Title: Grandmaster (2020)
- FIDE rating: 2588 (July 2026)
- Peak rating: 2594 (April 2026)

Luis Engel (born 14 October 2002) is a German chess grandmaster (since 2020).

He scored 8/9 on Germany's second team at the 2016 World Youth Chess Olympiad, claiming the top prize on the 2nd board.

At the German championships:

- 2012: U10 4th place
- 2013: U12 7th place
- 2014: U12 1st place, German champion
- 2015: U14 4th place
- 2016: U14 1st place, German champion
- 2017: U16 4th place
- 2019: U18 1st place, European team champion
- 2020: 1st place, German champion
- 2021: 1st place, German masters

Engel received the International Master title in 2018.
