= Tamás Horváth (chess player) =

Hungarian chess player (1951–2026)

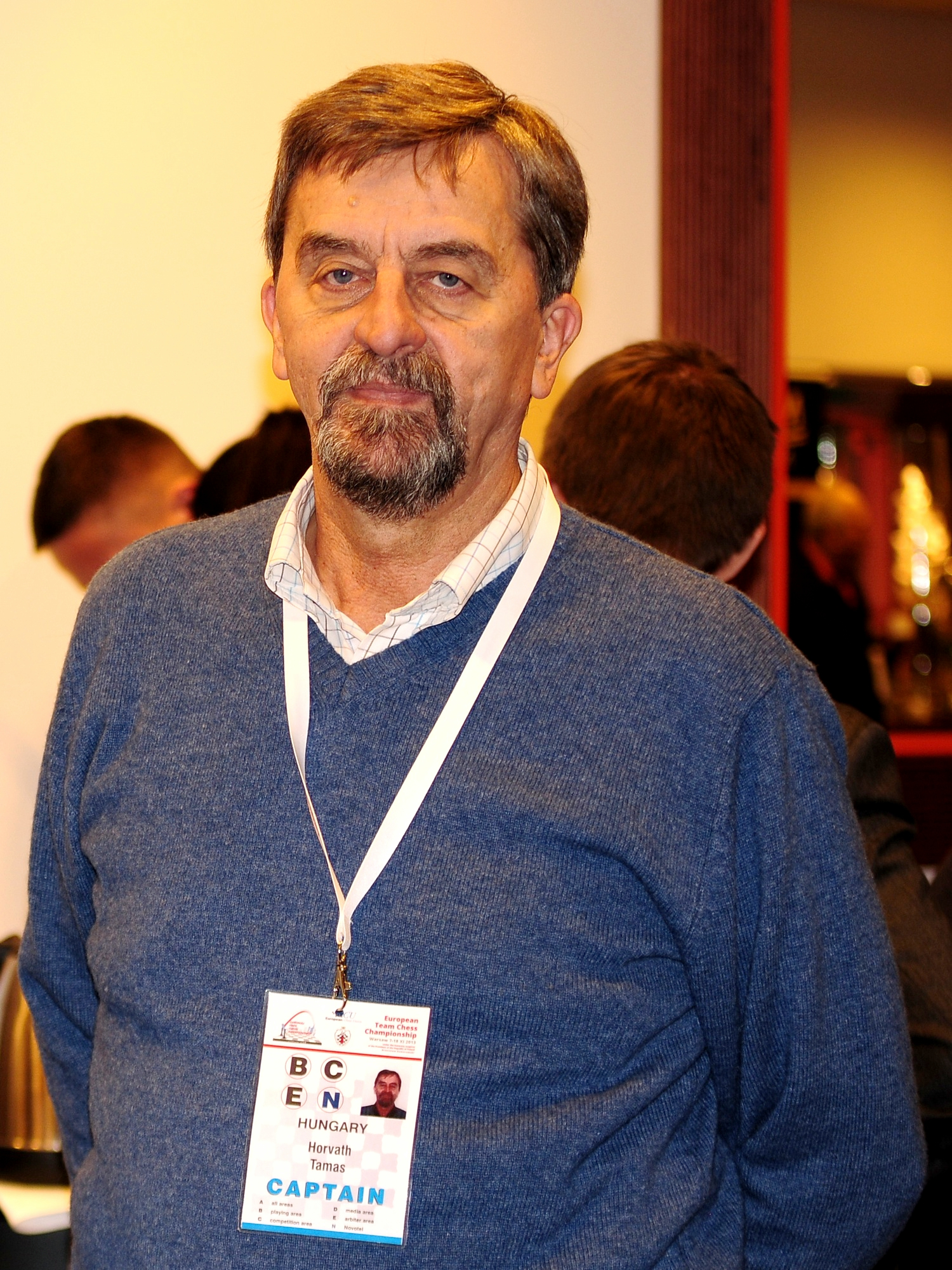
- Horváth in 2013

Personal information
- Born: 23 October 1951 Zalaegerszeg, Zala County, Hungary
- Died: June 2026 (aged 74)

Chess career
- Country: Hungary
- Title: International Master (1982)
- Peak rating: 2475 (January 1994)

Tamás Horváth (23 October 1951 – June 2026) was a Hungarian chess International Master (1982). He was a European Team Chess Championship bronze medalist (1983).

== Biography ==
In the 1980s Horváth was one of the top Hungarian chess players. He competed many times in the finals of the individual Hungarian Chess Championships and twice in 1980 and 1982 won silver medals.

Horváth played for Hungary in the European Team Chess Championship:

- In 1983, at second reserve board in the 8th European Team Chess Championship in Plovdiv (+3, =1, -1), and won team bronze and individual silver medals.

He played for Hungary in the World Student Team Chess Championship:

- In 1974, at second reserve board in the 20th World Student Team Chess Championship in Teesside (+5, =1, -1) and won team bronze medal.

Horváth played for Hungary in the Men's Chess Mitropa Cup:

- In 1991, at reserve board in the 14th Chess Mitropa Cup in Brno (+1, =1, -0).

He played for chess club Zalaegerszegi Csuti Antal SK in the European Chess Club Cup 11 times (1993-1996, 1999, 2001–2002, 2004–2007).

In 1982, Horváth was awarded the FIDE International Master (IM) title.

Horváth died in June 2026, at the age of 75.
