= Dimitris Alexakis =

Greek chess grandmaster (born 2003)

Personal information
- Born: April 25, 2003 (age 23)

Chess career
- Country: Greece
- Title: Grandmaster (2025)
- FIDE rating: 2513 (November 2026)
- Peak rating: 2548 (October 2025)

Dimitris Alexakis is a Greek chess grandmaster.

== Chess career ==
In February 2023, he played for the NTUA Le Roi Chess Team (alongside Yannis Kalogeris, Konstantinos Tsarsitalides, and Anastasis Koukas) in the Kasparov Cup, which won the tournament.

In October 2023, he won the bronze medal in the FIDE World Junior Rapid Chess Championship.

He was awarded the Grandmaster title in 2025, after achieving his norms at the:

- Korentinis Memorial GM Tournament in August 2024
- 5th Wood Green Invitational in March 2025
- 11th Cesme International Open Chess Tournament in June 2025
