= Mikhail Bryakin =

Russian-Serbian chess grandmaster (born 1997)

Personal information
- Born: January 9, 1997 (age 29) Saratov, Russia

Chess career
- Country: Russia (until 2023); Serbia (since 2023)
- Title: Grandmaster (2022)
- FIDE rating: 2483 (July 2026)
- Peak rating: 2502 (December 2021)

Mikhail Valerievich Bryakin (Serbian Cyrillic: Михаил Валеријевич Брјакин; Russian: Михаил Валерьевич Брякин) is a Russian chess grandmaster who plays for Serbia.

== Chess career ==
In June 2017, he played in the Rashid Nezhmetdinov Memorial, where he was the winner of the under-2450 rating category.

He achieved the Grandmaster title in 2022, after earning his norms at the:

- Third Saturday Mix 167 in February 2021
- Third Saturday Mix 216 in August 2021
- GM Third Saturday Mix 220 in November 2021

He has served as the captain and coach of the South African men's olympiad team.
