= Galaviz =

Galaviz is a surname. Notable people with the surname include:

- Justo Galaviz (1954–2013), Venezuelan cyclist
- Soñia Galaviz (fl. 2022), American politician
