= Anthony Atanasov =

Canadian chess grandmaster (born 2008)

Personal information
- Born: January 30, 2008 (age 18) Oakville, Ontario

Chess career
- Country: Canada
- Title: Grandmaster (2026)
- FIDE rating: 2481 (September 2026)
- Peak rating: 2481 (August 2026)

Anthony Atanasov is a Canadian chess grandmaster.

== Chess career ==
In December 2024, he finished 6th overall in the Tournament of the Accused after having placed 3rd in the qualifier event.

In January 2026, he qualified for the eight-player Knockout Finals of the 2026 Chess.com Puzzles Championship.

In April 2026, he tied for first place with Shawn Rodrigue-Lemieux and Sai Krishna G V in the Canadian Chess Championship, but was ranked 2nd after tiebreak scores. He was selected to represent Canada in the 46th Chess Olympiad.

In June 2026, he won the U18 section of the World Youth Chess Championship, defeating compatriot Emanuel Kot on tiebreak scores after they both scored 9/11.
