= Shawn Rodrigue-Lemieux =

Canadian chess grandmaster (born 2004)

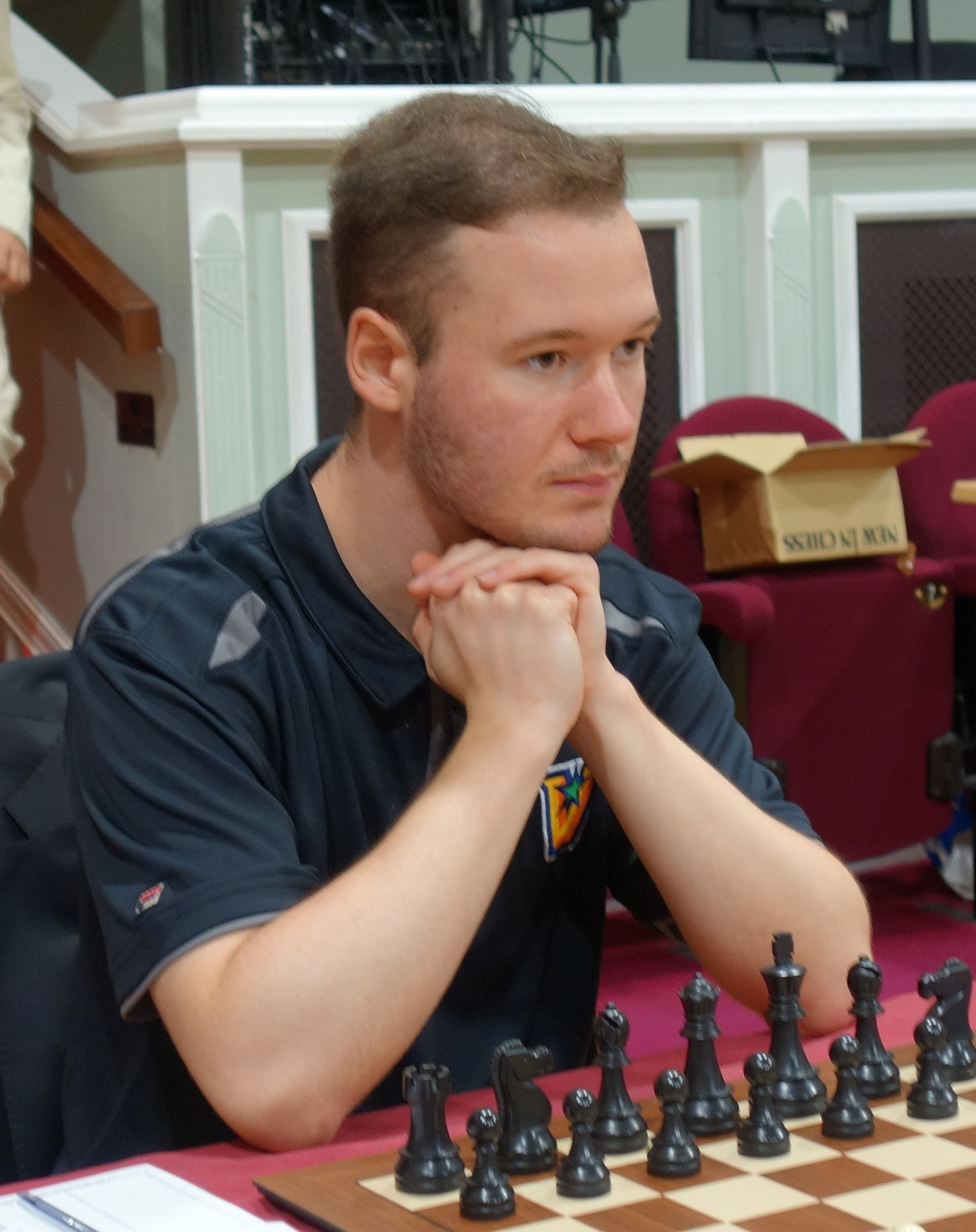
- Rodrigue-Lemieux in 2023

Personal information
- Born: March 22, 2004 (age 22) Montreal, Quebec, Canada

Chess career
- Country: Canada
- Title: Grandmaster (2024)
- FIDE rating: 2536 (September 2026)
- Peak rating: 2536 (September 2026)

Shawn Rodrigue-Lemieux (born 2004) is a Canadian chess grandmaster who won the 2022 World Under 18 Chess Championship. He completed all requirements for a Grandmaster title in 2023 at the age of 19, and was officially awarded the GM title in January 2024. He is the youngest grandmaster in Quebec's history.

== Chess career ==
Son of Isabelle Rodrigue and Alexandre Lemieux, Shawn learned to play chess at age 6 at an after school program and quickly fell in love with the game. In his first event, at 6, he won five straight games, and at 12, he had a FIDE rating of over 2000. He became an International Master at 18 and a Grandmaster at 19.

He achieved a perfect 9/9 score at the 2022 Charlotte Chess Center IM C Norm Invitational with a performance rating of 3037. This result garnered attention on social media, including a video on the popular YouTube channel Gotham Chess.

By becoming the World Youth Chess Champion in the under 18 section, he earned his first grandmaster norm, became only the second Canadian to win a World Youth Chess Championship and the first Canadian over 14 to win the Youth Chess Championship. In November 2023, he earned his final GM norm at the FIDE Grand Swiss Tournament 2023, where he defeated a number of higher-rated grandmasters including Benjamin Gledura, Max Warmerdam, and Vasyl Ivanchuk.

On April 7, 2026, he won the Canadian Chess Championship with a score of 7/9 beating Anthony Atanasov and Sai Krishna G V on tiebreaks.

== Playing style ==
Nakamura vs. Rodrigue-Lemieux, Toronto 2022

Position: g1 white king, c1 white bishop, f2 white pawn, g3 white pawn, h4 white pawn, c4 black bishop, a5 white rook, f6 black pawn, h7 black pawn, g7 black pawn, g8 black king, c8 black rook

Final position after 25.Rxa5. One of the few games where Nakamura was held to a draw in the event.

In 2022, Rodrigue-Lemieux played 2 exhibition games against Hikaru Nakamura and was one of the few people to hold him to a draw in one of his games. An unorthodox player, Rodrigue-Lemieux is known to use uncommon openings with regularity, most notably Anderssen's Opening. He has stated that his use of uncommon openings throws opponents off, and might be useful in getting well prepared players out of book early on. His favourite player is Magnus Carlsen whom he hopes to beat in the future.

== Personal life ==
Rodrigue-Lemieux is a Québecois residing in Montreal. He first discovered his interest in chess in Grade 1 where he saw his classmates playing and signed up for chess classes.

He was enrolled in Collège de Maisonneuve. In April 2023, he was offered a four-year scholarship to the University of Texas Rio Grande Valley, renowned for its recruitment of talented chess players. Currently, Rodrigue-Lemieux attends the university and is studying a biomedical sciences major.
