= 2026 United States Chess Championship =

2026 Chess tournament

US Chess Championships 2026
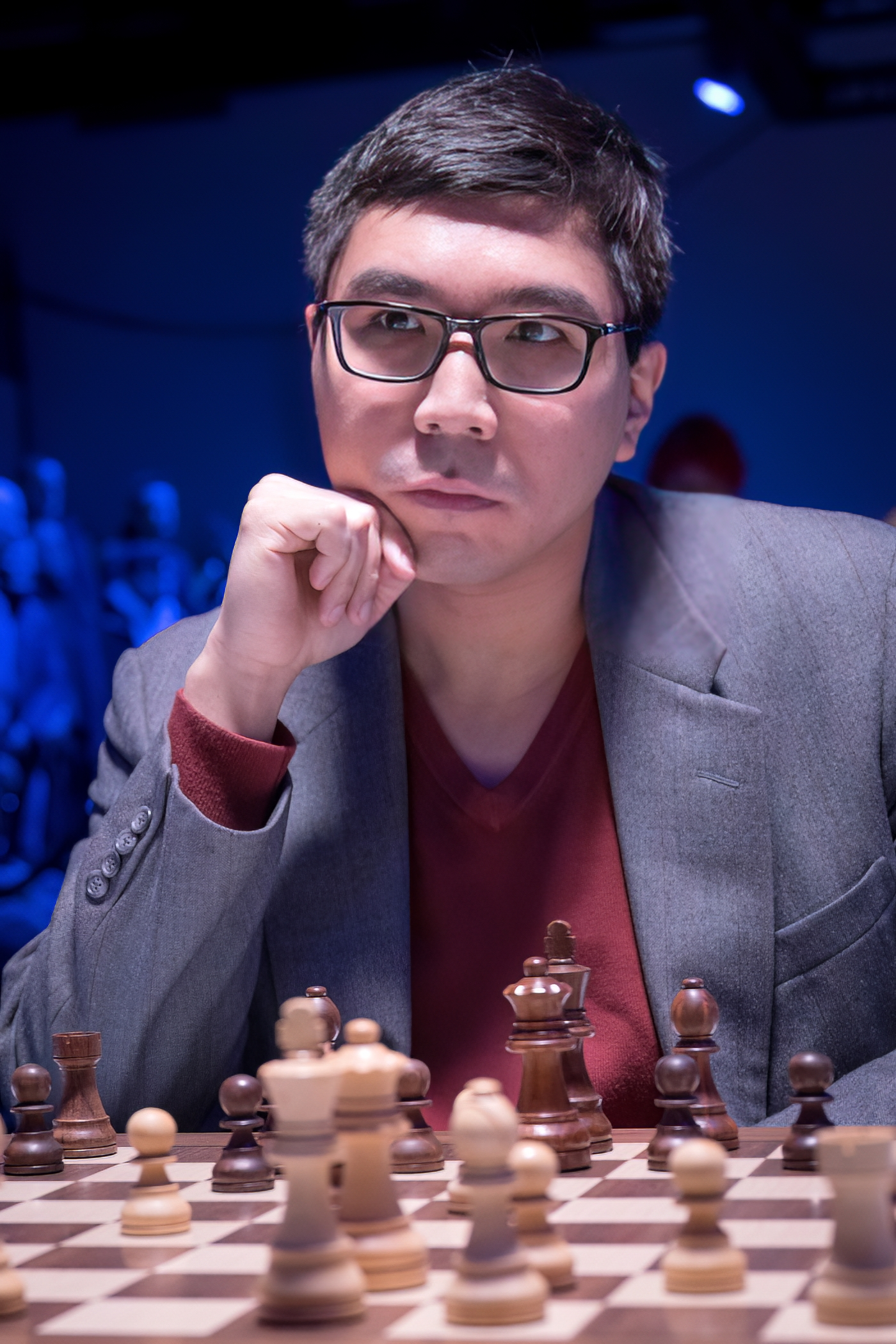
- Wesley So, the winner of the tournament, earned the title as the United States Chess Champion
- Venue: Saint Louis Chess Club
- Location: St. Louis, Missouri
- Dates: 9–23 October 2026
- Competitors: 12
- Winning score: 7 points out of 11
- Total prize money: $250,000

Champion
- (United States) Wesley So

The 2026 edition of the United States Chess Championship took place at the Saint Louis Chess Club in St. Louis, Missouri from 9 October to 23 October 2026. As with every United States Chess Championship tournament since 2014, it was a round-robin tournament. Twelve players were invited to compete. Besides the reigning US champion, these included the winners of the US Open Chess Championship, the US Junior Championship. The remaining players were chosen by highest invitational rating, or were selected by the United States Chess Federation (USCF) as wildcards.

The twelve qualifiers were Fabiano Caruana, Wesley So, Levon Aronian, Hans Niemann, Samuel Sevian, Awonder Liang, Ray Robson, Jeffery Xiong, Sam Shankland, Grigoriy Oparin, Abhimanyu Mishra and Andy Woodward, all of whom were grandmasters. Wesley So won the tournament after Rapid playoffs. This was his fourth title.

== Participants ==
All statistics were as of October 2026 in FIDE ratings.

Participants
Player	Age	Rating	World ranking	Qualification method
(United States) Fabiano Caruana (defending champion)	34	2784	3	2025 Champion
(United States) Wesley So	33	2770	6	Rating
(United States) Levon Aronian	44	2725	19	Rating
(United States) Hans Niemann	23	2717	22	Rating
(United States) Samuel Sevian	24	2708	31	Rating
(United States) Awonder Liang	23	2685	40	Rating
(United States) Ray Robson	31	2659	55	Rating
(United States) Jeffery Xiong	25	2656	58	Rating
(United States) Sam Shankland	35	2646	73	Rating
(United States) Grigoriy Oparin	29	2638	82	2026 US Open Champion
(United States) Abhimanyu Mishra	17	2636	85	Wildcard
(United States) Andy Woodward	16	2619	112	2026 US Junior Champion

== Organization ==
The tournament was a twelve-player, round-robin tournament, meaning there were 11 rounds with each player facing the others once. The tournament winner became the United States Chess Champion.

=== Regulations ===
- The time control was 90 minutes for the first 40 moves, followed by 30 minutes for the rest of the game. There was a 30-second increment starting on move one.
- Players were not allowed to draw by agreement.
- The event was a 12-player round-robin, where every player played once against every other player on the field.
- Players got 1 point for a win, 0.5 points for a draw, and 0 points for a loss.
- The player with the most points at the end of the last round won the event.

=== Tie breaks ===
If there is tie for first place, such a situation will be addressed as follows:

If two players tie for first a two-game 15+10 rapid match will take place. If there remains a tie, a single armageddon game will occur.

If three or four players tie for first a single round-robin in the 15+10 rapid time control will take place

If two players remain tied, they contest a two-game 5+2 blitz match. If the tie persists, an armageddon game decides the winner.

If three or more players remain tied, they contest a 5+2 round-robin.

If more than four players tie for first players will contest a 5+2 round-robin. If the round-robin ends in a tie, a series of armageddon games decide the winner.

=== Prize money ===
The event featured a $250,000 prize fund, distributed as follows:

Place	Cash prize (USD)
1st	$55,000 (+$7,000 winner bonus)
2nd	$43,000
3rd	$35,000
4th	$25,000
5th	$20,000
6th	$14,000
7th	$11,000
8th	$10,000
9th	$9,000
10th	$8,000
11th	$7,000
12th	$6,000

== Results ==
=== Standings ===
Wesley So and Fabiano Caruana tied for first place and moved into tiebreaks under a double round-robin in the 15+10 rapid time control.

#	Player	Rating	1	2	3	4	5	6	7	8	9	10	11	12	Points
1	(United States) Wesley So	2770		½	½	1	1	½	½	½	1	½	1	0	7
2	(United States) Fabiano Caruana (defending champion)	2784	½		1	½	0	½	½	1	1	½	1	½	7
3	(United States) Grigoriy Oparin	2638	½	0		½	½	½	½	1	1	½	½	1	6½
4	(United States) Jeffery Xiong	2656	0	½	½		½	½	1	1	0	1	½	1	6½
5	(United States) Andy Woodward	2619	0	1	½	½		½	½	½	½	½	1	½	6
6	(United States) Abhimanyu Mishra	2636	½	½	½	½	½		½	½	½	0	½	1	5½
7	(United States) Levon Aronian	2725	½	½	½	0	½	½		0	1	½	1	½	5½
8	(United States) Awonder Liang	2685	½	0	0	0	½	½	1		½	1	½	1	5½
9	(United States) Sam Shankland	2646	0	0	0	1	½	½	0	½		1	½	1	5
10	(United States) Hans Niemann	2717	½	½	½	0	½	1	½	0	0		0	½	4
11	(United States) Ray Robson	2659	0	0	½	½	0	½	0	½	½	1		½	4
12	(United States) Samuel Sevian	2708	1	½	0	0	½	0	½	0	0	½	½		3½

=== Tiebreaks ===
Wesley So won the tournament after beating Fabiano Caruana in the tiebreaks.

#	Player	Rating	1	2	Points
1	(United States) Wesley So	2770	½	1	1½
2	(United States) Fabiano Caruana (defending champion)	2784	½	0	½
