= Amilal Munkhdalai =

Mongolian chess player (born 2006)

Personal information
- Born: December 11, 2006 (age 19)

Chess career
- Country: Mongolia
- Title: International Master (2024)
- FIDE rating: 2503 (November 2026)
- Peak rating: 2503 (October 2026)

Amilal Munkhdalai (Mongolian: Амилал Мөнхдалай, romanized: Amilal Mönkhdalai; born December 11, 2006) is a Mongolian chess player. He became FIDE Master in 2019 and International Master in 2024.

== Chess career ==
Amilal won gold in the 2023 Mongolian Chess Championship, at the age of 16. He became the youngest-ever champion in the open section, scoring 8.5/11 with no defeats.

In 2026, he won a silver medal with his team in the 46th Chess Olympiad Category B.
