= Štěpán Žilka =

Czech chess grandmaster (born 1988)

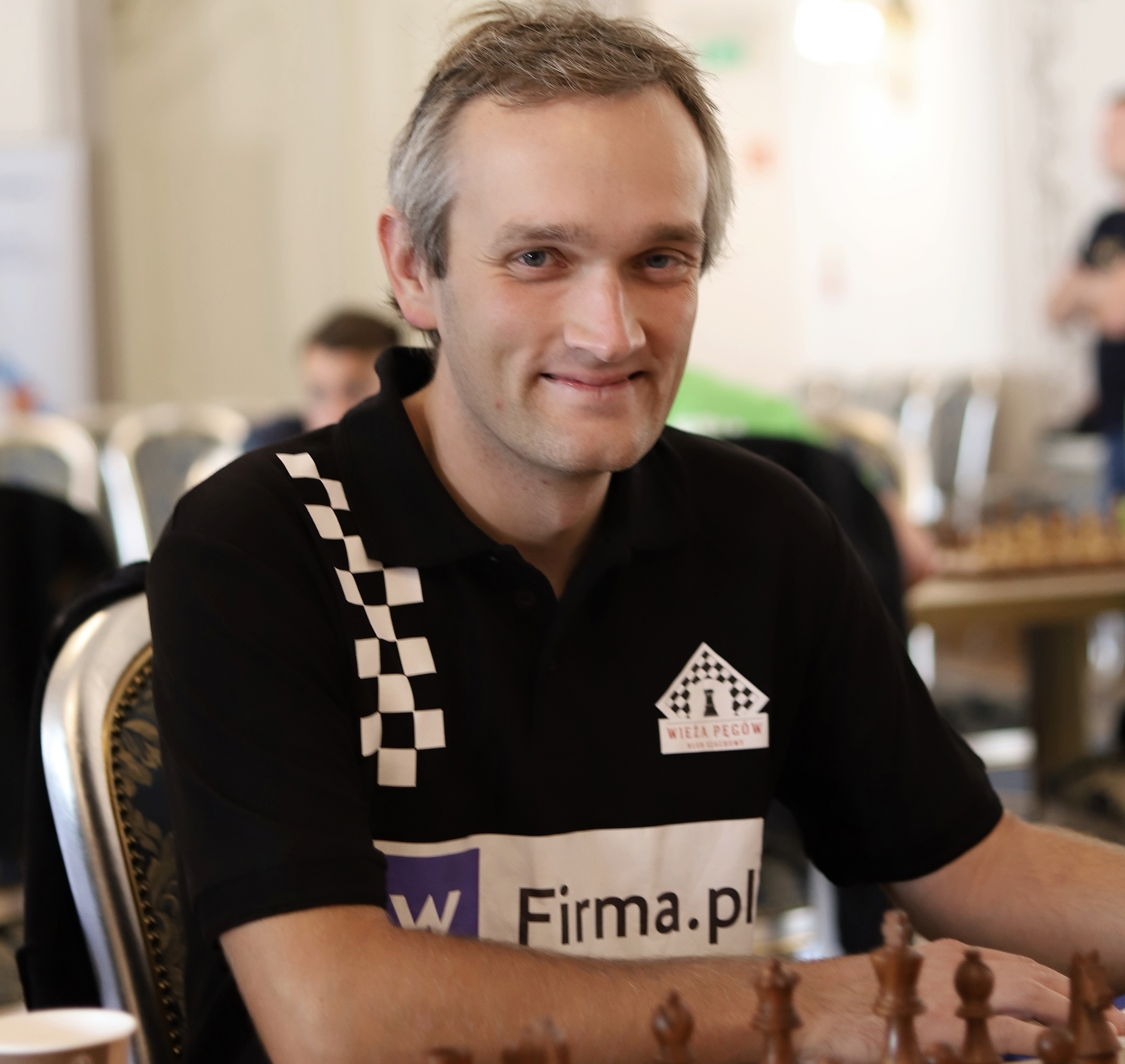
- Štěpán Žilka in 2021

Personal information
- Born: 11 November 1988 (age 37) Litovel, Czech Republic

Chess career
- Country: Czech Republic
- Title: Grandmaster (2014)
- FIDE rating: 2526 (July 2026)
- Peak rating: 2615 (December 2023)

Štěpán Žilka (born 11 November 1988 in Litovel) is a Czech chess grandmaster

== Career ==
He earned his international master title in 2007 and his grandmaster title in 2014.

He started his career with TJ Tatran Litovel, since 2012 he played for 1. Novoborský ŠK but also played in Austria (Blackburne Nickelsdorf) and in Germany (SF Deizsiau). He has won the Olomuc Chess Summer (C-Group) in 2009 ahead of Konstantin Chernyshov and again in 2015 this time in the A1 group .In 2008, 2010–2011, 2013–2014 and 2016–2017 he played with the Czech Team in the Mitropa Cup and won it in 2016.

His peak rating was 2613 in April 2022.
