= Li Di (chess player) =

Chinese chess grandmaster (born 1999)

Personal information
- Born: December 15, 1999 (age 26) Chengdu, Sichuan, China

Chess career
- Country: China
- Title: Grandmaster (2019)
- FIDE rating: 2544 (July 2026)
- Peak rating: 2581 (June 2021)

Li Di (Chinese: 李荻; born December 15, 1999) is a Chinese chess grandmaster.

== Chess career ==
In 2013, Li won the U14 World Youth Chess Championship held in Al Ain, United Arab Emirates.

In May 2021, Li finished 3rd in the Chinese Chess Championship, losing to Yu Yangyi and Wei Yi on tiebreaks based on Sonneborn–Berger score.

In November 2022, Li finished 4th in the Chinese Chess Championship, losing to Xu Xiangyu on tiebreak based on Sonneborn-Berger score. Li, along with Lu Shanglei, Xu Xiangyu, and Bai Jinshi, was part of the Chinese team who won the 2022 World Team Chess Championship.
