= Jiang Haochen =

Chinese chess player (born 2011)

Personal information
- Born: March 2011 (age 15) Jinan, China

Chess career
- Country: China
- Title: International Master (2025)
- FIDE rating: 2501 (November 2026)
- Peak rating: 2501 (November 2026)

Jiang Haochen (Chinese: 姜昊辰) is a Chinese chess player.

== Chess career ==
He began playing chess at the age of 6, and became the youngest International Master from China, earning the title in 2025 at the age of 14. In April 2025, he won the men’s blitz chess competition of the U15 World School Summer Games.

In October 2025, he finished in second place in the U14 Open section of the World Youth Chess Championship.

In December 2025, he finished in third place in the Shenzhen Masters despite being the bottom seed, defeating grandmaster Lu Shanglei in the third place playoff.
