= Sai Krishna G V =

Indian-Canadian chess player (born 1996)

Personal information
- Born: May 19, 1996 (age 30) Vijayawada, India

Chess career
- Country: India (until 2024); Canada (since 2024)
- Title: International Master (2018)
- FIDE rating: 2458 (October 2026)
- Peak rating: 2461 (August 2026)

Sai Krishna Gottipati V is an Indian-Canadian chess player.

== Chess career ==
Sai Krishna G.V. aka Sai Krishna Gottipati (born 19 May 1996) is a Canadian national, prominent researcher in the field of Artificial Intelligence and an International Master in chess. He is currently ranked in top-5 in Canada. His research in the fields of computer vision, robotics, drug discovery, large language models and reinforcement learning has been published in several top international conferences and journals and has received more than 500 citations. == Achievements in Chess

National Championships

- Quebec National Champion, (2026, Montreal)
- Quebec National Champion, (2025, Montreal)
- Indian National Champion, U-9 (2005, Chennai)
- Indian National Champion, U-13 (2008, Vellore)
- Indian National Champion, subjuniors (2011, Chennai)
- Canadian Closed, 3rd place (tied for first) (2026, Montreal)
- Canadian Closed, 6th place (2024, Toronto)

World Championships:

- World Youth Bronze, U-10 (2006, Batumi)
- World Youth Bronze, U-14 (2009, Antalya)

Asian Championships:

- Asian Youth Champion, U-10 (2006, Tehran)
- Asian Youth Bronze, U-8 (2004, Singapore)
- Asian Youth Team Gold, U-8 (2004, Singapore)
- Asian Youth U-10, 4th (2007, Al Ain)
- Asian Youth U-14, 4th (2009, New Delhi)

Commonwealth Championships

- Commonwealth Silver, U-10 (2006, Mumbai)
- Commonwealth Silver, U-12 (2007, New Delhi)
- Commonwealth Silver, U-14 (2010, New Delhi)

In May 2011 he won the National Sub-Juniors.In August 2017, he tied for first place with Geetha Narayanan Gopal, Girish A. Koushik, and Abhijeet Gupta in the ChessMine Rapid, but was defeated by Gopal in the first tiebreak round.

In August 2025, he tied for first place with grandmaster Bator Sambuev in the Quebec Invitational Championship, winning the championship on tiebreak scores.

In April 2026, he tied for first place with Shawn Rodrigue-Lemieux and Anthony Atanasov in the Canadian Chess Championship, but was ranked 3rd after tiebreak scores. He was selected to represent Canada in the 46th Chess Olympiad.

== Personal life ==
He moved to Canada in 2024, settling in Montreal and working as an artificial intelligence researcher.
