= Dominik Horvath =

Austrian chess grandmaster (born 2003)

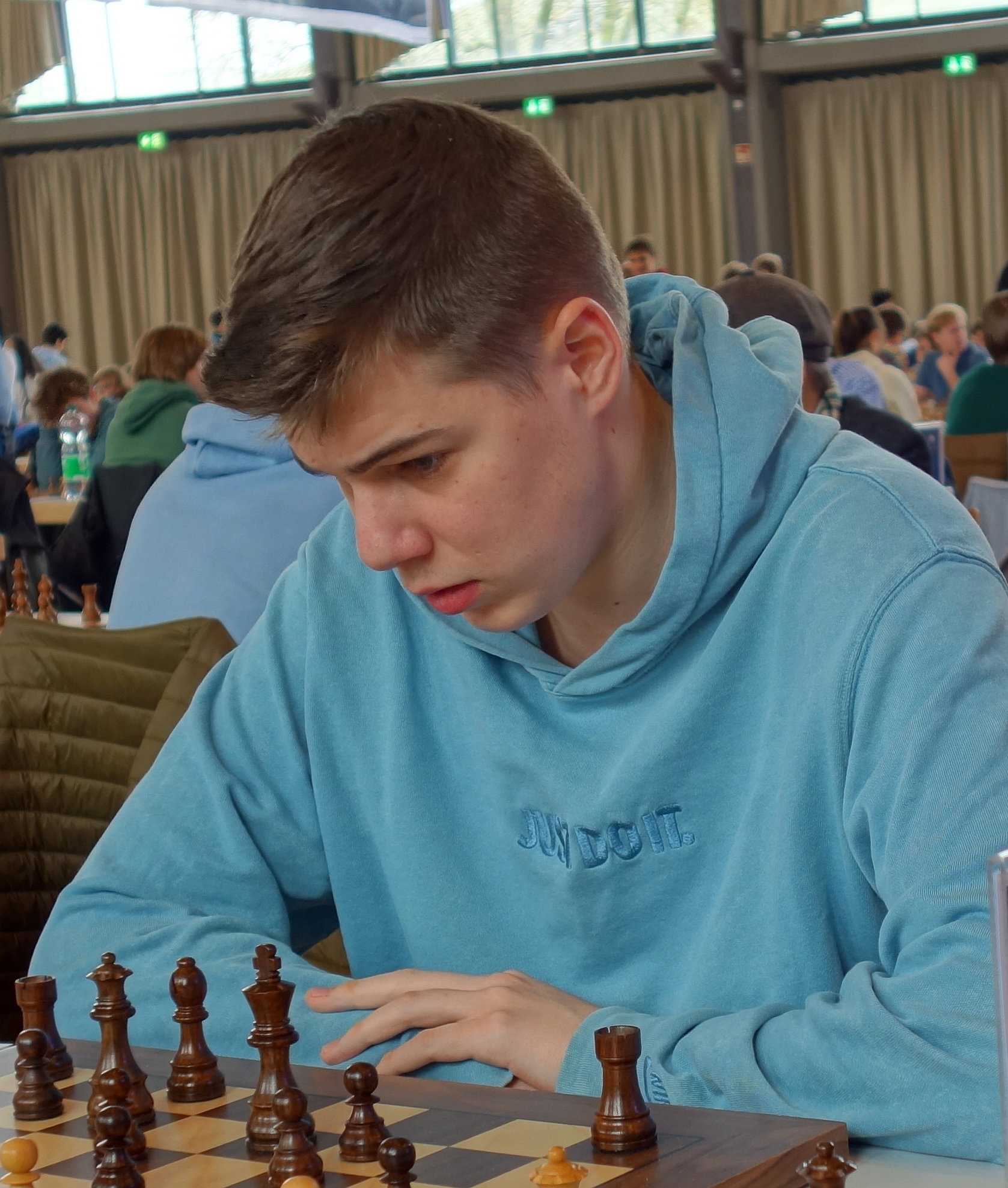
- Horvath in 2024

Personal information
- Born: August 29, 2003 (age 23) Eisenstadt, Austria

Chess career
- Country: Austria
- Title: Grandmaster (2024)
- FIDE rating: 2560 (October 2026)
- Peak rating: 2566 (November 2026)

Dominik Horvath is an Austrian chess grandmaster.

== Chess career ==
In August 2022, he tied for first place in the Austrian Chess Championship, but took the bronze medal after tiebreaks.

In December 2023, he was the tournament leader with a perfect score after the fifth round of the Chessable Sunway Sitges. After the sixth round, he remained as a joint leader alongside Sethuraman S.P., Brandon Jacobson, and Iniyan P. He ultimately finished in 17th place with a score of 7/10.
