= Ido Gorshtein =

Israeli chess grandmaster (born 2002)

Personal information
- Born: July 13, 2002 (age 24) Kfar Saba, Israel

Chess career
- Country: Israel
- Title: Grandmaster (2023)
- FIDE rating: 2555 (November 2026)
- Peak rating: 2571 (August 2025)

Ido Iliyahu Gorshtein is an Israeli chess grandmaster.

== Chess career ==
In March 2021, he tied for second place with Tamir Nabaty in the Israeli Chess Championship and was ultimately ranked in second after tiebreak scores.

In December 2022, he won the Israeli Chess Championship, finishing a full-point ahead of runners-up Ori Kochavi and Avital Boruchovsky.

In September 2024, he played for Israel in the 45th Chess Olympiad, where he scored 4/9 on board 2.
