= Zeng Chongsheng =

Chinese chess grandmaster (born 1993)

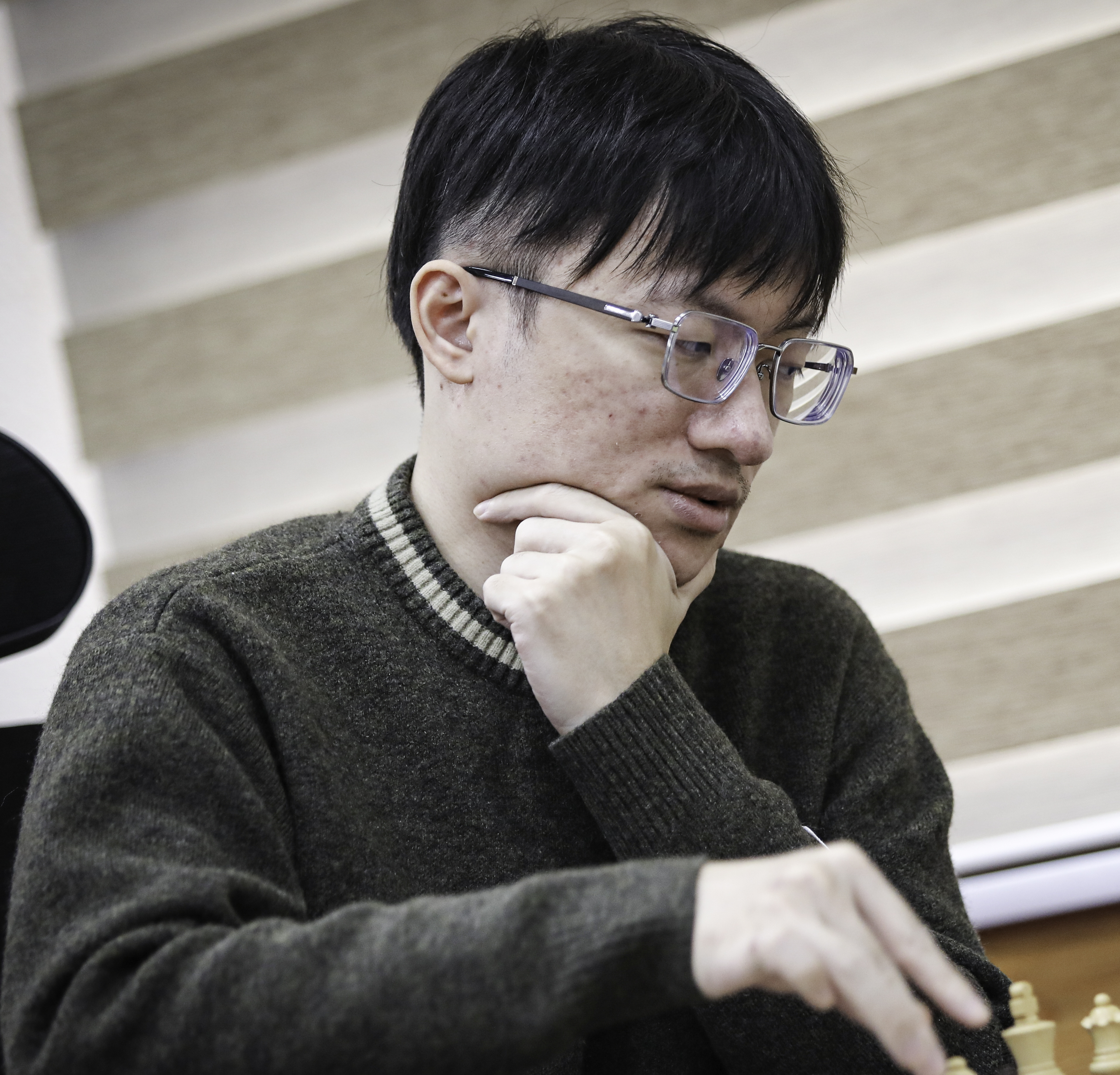

Personal information
- Born: June 10, 1993 (age 33) Guangdong, China

Chess career
- Country: China
- Title: Grandmaster (2013)
- FIDE rating: 2565 (July 2026)
- Peak rating: 2604 (October 2022)

Zeng Chongsheng (Chinese: 曾重生; born June 10, 1993) is a Chinese chess grandmaster. He played for the bronze medal-winning Chinese team at the World Youth Under-16 Chess Olympiad in 2006. In 2016, Zeng shared second place at the Chinese championship with Bai Jinshi, and at the 20th Hogeschool Zeeland Tournament in Vlissingen with Alberto David and Sipke Ernst.
