= Xu Xiangyu =

Chinese chess grandmaster (born 1999)

Personal information
- Born: September 19, 1999 (age 27) Taiyuan, Shanxi, China

Chess career
- Country: China
- Title: Grandmaster (2017)
- FIDE rating: 2628 (November 2026)
- Peak rating: 2636 (May 2024)
- Ranking: No. 94 (November 2026)
- Peak ranking: No. 92 (September 2026)

Xu Xiangyu (Chinese: 许翔宇; pinyin: Xǔ Xiángyǔ, born 1999) is a Chinese chess grandmaster. He is a second of Wei Yi and the Chinese national team captain.

== Career ==
Xu earned his grandmaster title in 2017.

Competing in the Chess World Cup 2019, he upset his higher-rated compatriot Bu Xiangzhi in the first round and Ernesto Inarkiev in the second, before losing to Alexander Grischuk in the third round.

In 2026, he won the Rilton Cup (the first tournament of the 2026-2027 FIDE Circuit) with 8 points in 9 rounds and no loses, a full point ahead of a three-way tie for 2nd place.

In May 2026, he won the Chinese Chess Championship at Xinghua with an undefeated score of 8.5/11.

== See also ==
- Chess in China
