= Naroditsky Memorial 2026 =

Chess tournament in Charlotte, U.S.

Naroditsky Memorial Rapid & Blitz 2026
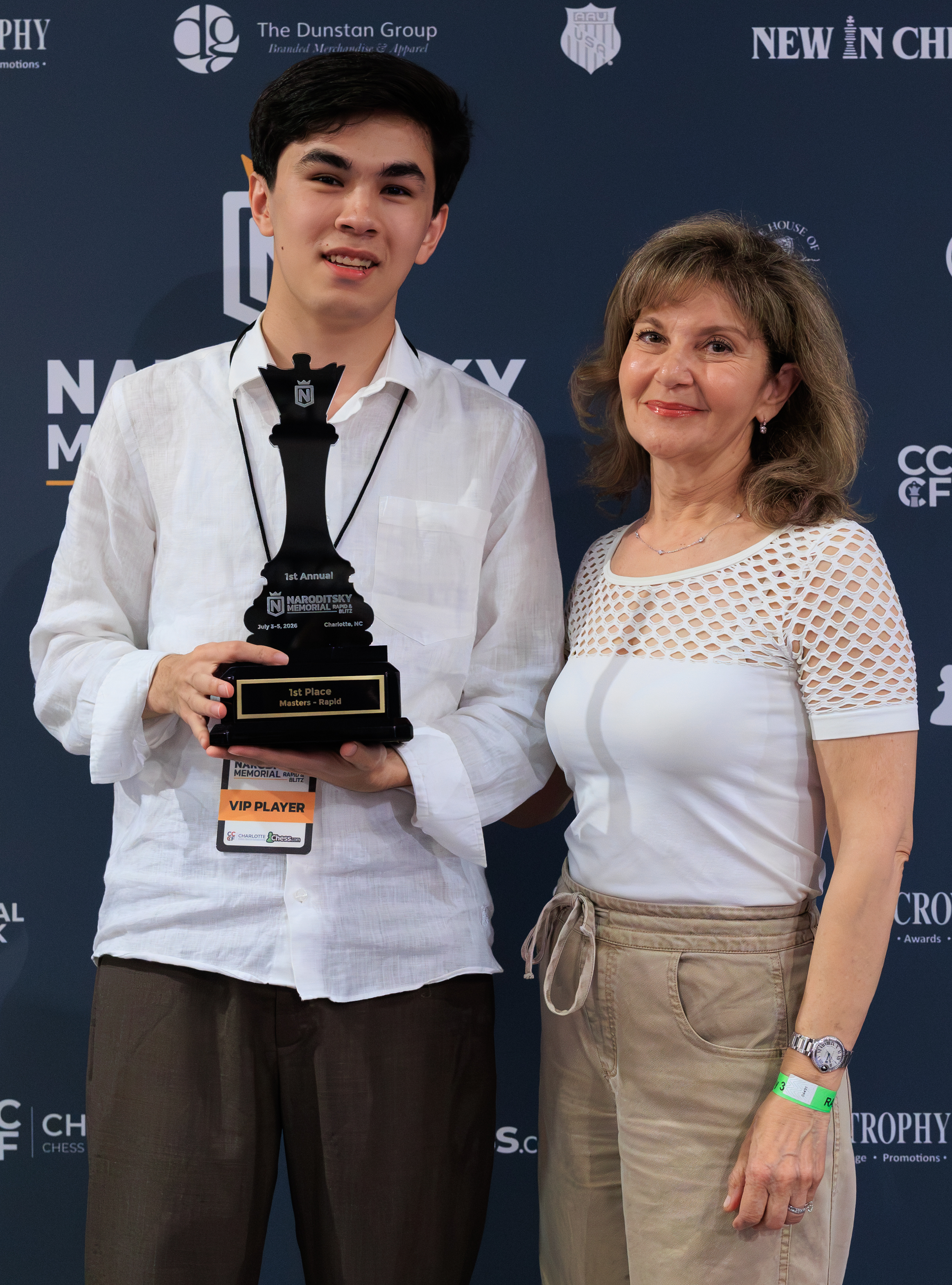
- Javokhir Sindarov (left), winner of both the Rapid and Blitz tournaments, alongside the mother of Daniel Naroditsky (right)

Tournament information
- Location: Charlotte, North Carolina, United States
- Dates: 3 July–5 July
- Format: Rapid and blitz chess
- Venue: Charlotte Marriot City Center
- Purse: $50,000

Final positions
- Champion: (Uzbekistan) Javokhir Sindarov (Rapid) (Uzbekistan) Javokhir Sindarov (Blitz)

The Naroditsky Memorial Rapid & Blitz 2026 was the inaugural edition of Naroditsky Memorial, held in Charlotte, North Carolina, United States in honour of the American grandmaster, author and commentator Daniel Naroditsky (1995–2025).

Javokhir Sindarov won the Rapid tournament by defeating Aravindh Chithambaram 2–0 in blitz playoffs, after they both tied for first on 6/7 in the main tournament. Sindarov also won the Blitz tournament by scoring 7½/9 in the Blitz Final, going undefeated.

== Organization ==
The event featured separate rapid and blitz tournaments, each with Masters and Challengers sections. A Creator Invitational blitz tournament featuring famous chess content creators and personalities around the world was held on 5 July.

=== FIDE Circuit ===
The Masters section of both the Rapid and Blitz were part of the 2026-2027 FIDE Circuit. Sindarov was awarded 11.30 points for first place in the Rapid and 9.28 points for first place in the blitz.

=== Regulations ===
The Rapid tournament had a 7-round Swiss format. Time control was 10 minutes with 5-second increment per move starting from move 1.

The Blitz tournament had an 11-round Swiss format, followed by a single round robin Blitz final including the top 10 finishers of Blitz Masters to determine the Masters champion. Time control was 3 minutes with 2-second increment per move starting from move 1.

Tiebreaks between players finishing on the same score in Challengers (also in Masters when playoffs for first place are not held) would be determined by Average rating of Opponents Cut 1, followed by Cumulative. Tiebreaks for the first place in Masters and top ten places in Blitz Masters would have been addressed as follows:

- Players would play two blitz chess games at 3 minutes plus 2 seconds per move.
- If three or four players had tied, a single round-robin would be played.
- If more than four players had tied, a single elimination tournament of armageddon would be played. Players would be seeded according to their final rankings after tiebreaks, with the higher seeds receiving a bye if the number of players was odd. Players would receive 2-second increment, with white receiving 3 minutes and black the bid time.

=== The Naroditsky Rule ===
Ties for Blitz Final qualification would require a playoff in what the regulations call "The Naroditsky Rule." Per Chief Organizer FM Peter Giannatos, Naroditsky was "distraught" over losing a spot in the 2024 World Blitz Championship knockout due to tiebreak, and therefore they included in the regulations that ties for 10th place had to "play their way in."

=== Prize ===
The total prize pool was $50,000, out of which the prize pool of the Rapid tournament was $20,000, and $30,000 of the Blitz tournament.

=== Schedule ===
The tournament took place from 3–5 July 2026 at the Charlotte Marriott City Center in Charlotte, North Carolina United States.

== Rapid tournament results ==
=== Masters ===
Notation: "1 (W)" indicates a win (1 point) with white pieces (W). "U" indicates that the round was unplayed.

| Rk. | Name | Elo | 1 | 2 | 3 | 4 | 5 | 6 | 7 | Total |
|---|---|---|---|---|---|---|---|---|---|---|
| 1 | (India) Aravindh Chithambaram | 2584 | 1 (W) | 1 (B) | 1 (W) | 0.5 (B) | 0.5 (W) | 1 (B) | 1 (W) | 6 |
| 2 | (Uzbekistan) Javokhir Sindarov | 2718 | 1 (W) | 1 (B) | 0 (W) | 1 (B) | 1 (W) | 1 (B) | 1 (W) | 6 |
| 3 | (United States) Andy Woodward | 2521 | 1 (B) | 1 (W) | 1 (B) | 0.5 (W) | 1 (B) | 0.5 (B) | 0.5 (W) | 5.5 |
| 4 | (Ukraine) Ruslan Ponomariov | 2648 | 1 (B) | 1 (W) | 1 (B) | 0.5 (W) | 0.5 (B) | 0.5 (W) | 1 (B) | 5.5 |
| 5 | (United States) Ray Robson | 2637 | 1 (W) | 0.5 (B) | 0.5 (W) | 1 (B) | 1 (W) | 0.5 (B) | 1 (W) | 5.5 |
| 6 | (United States) Andrew Hong | 2546 | 1 (B) | 1 (W) | 0 (B) | 1 (W) | 0.5 (B) | 1 (W) | 1 (B) | 5.5 |
| 7 | (Azerbaijan) Aydin Suleymanli | 2561 | 1 (B) | 1 (W) | 1 (B) | 1 (W) | 0.5 (B) | 0.5 (W) | 0 (B) | 5 |
| 8 | (United States) Steven Zierk | 2500 | 1 (W) | 0.5 (B) | 0.5 (W) | 1 (B) | 1 (W) | 0 (B) | 1 (W) | 5 |
| 9 | (United States) Grigoriy Oparin | 2606 | 1 (B) | 1 (W) | 0.5 (B) | 0.5 (W) | 1 (B) | 1 (W) | 0 (B) | 5 |
| 10 | (United States) Leinier Domínguez | 2666 | 0.5 (W) | 1 (B) | 1 (W) | 0.5 (B) | 1 (W) | 0.5 (B) | 0.5 (W) | 5 |
| 11 | (Israel) Boris Gelfand | 2623 | 0.5 (W) | 1 (B) | 1 (W) | 0.5 (B) | 1 (W) | 0.5 (W) | 0.5 (B) | 5 |
| 12 | (United States) Wesley So | 2719 | 1 (B) | 0.5 (W) | 0.5 (B) | 1 (W) | 0 (B) | 1 (W) | 1 (B) | 5 |
| 13 | (Ukraine) Olexandr Bortnyk | 2608 | 1 (B) | 0.5 (W) | 0 (B) | 1 (W) | 1 (B) | 1 (W) | 0.5 (B) | 5 |
| 14 | (United States) Robert Hess | 2621 | 1 (B) | 0 (W) | 1 (B) | 1 (W) | 0 (B) | 1 (W) | 1 (W) | 5 |
| 15 | (United States) Andrew Tang | 2440 | 1 (B) | 1 (W) | 0 (B) | 1 (W) | 0 (B) | 1 (W) | 1 (B) | 5 |
| 16 | (United States) Samuel Sevian | 2666 | 1 (W) | 1 (B) | 1 (W) | 0 (B) | 1 (W) | 0.5 (B) | 0 (W) | 4.5 |
| 17 | (FIDE) Semen Khanin | 2501 | 1 (W) | 0.5 (B) | 1 (W) | 0.5 (B) | 1 (W) | 0.5 (W) | 0 (B) | 4.5 |
| 18 | (United States) Dariusz Świercz | 2654 | 1 (W) | 0.5 (B) | 0.5 (W) | 1 (B) | 1 (W) | 0 (W) | 0.5 (B) | 4.5 |
| 19 | (United States) Fabiano Caruana | 2716 | 1 (B) | 1 (W) | 0.5 (B) | 0 (W) | 0 (B) | 1 (W) | 1 (B) | 4.5 |
| 20 | (Peru) Emilio Córdova | 2610 | 1 (W) | 1 (B) | 0.5 (W) | 0.5 (W) | 0 (B) | 1 (B) | 0.5 (W) | 4.5 |
| 21 | (India) Ashwin Jayaram | 2513 | 1 (W) | 0.5 (B) | 1 (W) | 0 (W) | 0 (B) | 1 (B) | 1 (W) | 4.5 |
| 22 | (United States) Nico Chasin | 2448 | 1 (B) | 0 (W) | 1 (B) | 1 (W) | 0 (B) | 1 (B) | 0.5 (W) | 4.5 |
| 23 | (United States) Awonder Liang | 2556 | 0 (B) | 1 (W) | 1 (B) | 1 (B) | 0.5 (W) | 1 (W) | 0 (B) | 4.5 |
| 24 | (Netherlands) Robby Kevlishvili | 2523 | 1 (W) | 0 (B) | 1 (W) | 1 (B) | 0 (W) | 0.5 (B) | 1 (W) | 4.5 |
| 25 | (Latvia) Arturs Neikšāns | 2522 | 1 (W) | 1 (B) | 0 (W) | 0.5 (B) | 1 (W) | 0 (B) | 1 (W) | 4.5 |
| 26 | (United States) Eric Liu | 0 | 0 (B) | 1 (W) | 1 (B) | 0 (B) | 1 (W) | 1 (W) | 0.5 (B) | 4.5 |
| 27 | (Finland) Teemu Virtanen | 0 | 0 (W) | 0.5 (B) | 0 (W) | 1 (B) | 1 (W) | 1 (B) | 1 (W) | 4.5 |
| 28 | (Ukraine) Vasyl Ivanchuk | 2636 | 1 (W) | 1 (B) | 0.5 (W) | 1 (B) | 0.5 (W) | 0 (W) | 0 (B) | 4 |
| 29 | (United States) Zachary Tanenbaum | 2147 | 0 (B) | 1 (W) | 1 (B) | 0.5 (W) | 1 (W) | 0 (B) | 0.5 (W) | 4 |
| 30 | (United States) Kayden Troff | 2480 | 1 (B) | 0.5 (W) | 0.5 (B) | 1 (W) | 0 (B) | 1 (W) | 0 (W) | 4 |
| 31 | (United States) Ethan Sheehan | 0 | 1 (B) | 0 (W) | 1 (B) | 0 (W) | 1 (B) | 0 (B) | 1 (W) | 4 |
| 32 | (United States) Andrew Jiang | 2298 | 0 (B) | 1 (W) | 0 (B) | 1 (W) | 1 (B) | 0 (W) | 1 (B) | 4 |
| 33 | (United States) Eric Rosen | 2348 | 1 (B) | 0 (W) | 1 (B) | 0 (W) | 1 (B) | 1 (B) | 0 (W) | 4 |
| 34 | (India) Naveen Prabhu | 0 | 0 (W) | 1 (B) | 0.5 (W) | 0.5 (B) | 1 (W) | 0 (B) | 1 (W) | 4 |
| 35 | (Uzbekistan) Islombek Sindarov | 1941 | 0 (W) | 1 (B) | 1 (W) | 0 (B) | 1 (W) | 0 (B) | 1 (W) | 4 |
| 36 | (India) Sagar Shah | 2281 | 1 (W) | 0 (B) | 1 (W) | 0 (B) | 0.5 (W) | 0.5 (B) | 1 (W) | 4 |
| 37 | (Peru) Brian Ramírez | 2400 | 1 (W) | 0 (B) | 0 (W) | 1 (B) | 0 (W) | 1 (B) | 1 (W) | 4 |
| 38 | (India) Gauri Shankar | 0 | 1 (W) | 0 (B) | 0 (W) | 1 (B) | 1 (W) | 0 (B) | 1 (W) | 4 |
| 39 | (India) Aarav Dengla | 2223 | 0 (B) | 1 (W) | 0.5 (B) | 0.5 (W) | 0.5 (B) | 1 (W) | 0.5 (B) | 4 |
| 40 | (United States) Kostya Kavutskiy | 2414 | 1 (B) | 0.5 (W) | 0 (B) | 1 (W) | 0 (W) | 1 (B) | 0 (W) | 3.5 |
| 41 | (United States) Kiren Nasta | 1991 | 0 (B) | 1 (W) | 1 (B) | 0 (W) | 1 (B) | 0.5 (W) | 0 (B) | 3.5 |
| 42 | (Azerbaijan) Vasif Durarbayli | 2560 | 0.5 (W) | 1 (B) | 1 (W) | 1 (B) | 0 (W) | 0 (B) | 0 (W) | 3.5 |
| 43 | (United States) Benjamin Moon | 0 | 0.5 (B) | 0 (W) | 1 (B) | 0.5 (B) | 0 (W) | 1 (W) | 0.5 (B) | 3.5 |
| 44 | (United States) Mark Heimann | 2436 | 1 (B) | 0 (W) | 1 (B) | 0 (W) | 0 (B) | 1 (W) | 0.5 (B) | 3.5 |
| 45 | (United States) Alexander Jasinski | 1896 | 0 (W) | 0 (B) | 1 (W) | 1 (B) | 0.5 (W) | 0 (B) | 1 (B) | 3.5 |
| 46 | (Indonesia) Irene Sukandar | 2355 | 0 (W) | 1 (B) | 0 (W) | 1 (B) | 1 (W) | 0 (B) | 0.5 (W) | 3.5 |
| 47 | (France) Julien Song | 2278 | 0 (W) | 1 (B) | 0 (W) | 1 (B) | 0.5 (B) | 1 (W) | 0 (B) | 3.5 |
| 48 | (United States) Zubin Baliga | 1987 | 0 (W) | 0 (B) | 1 (W) | 1 (B) | 0 (B) | 0.5 (W) | 1 (B) | 3.5 |
| 49 | (United States) Levy Rozman | 2327 | 1 (W) | 1 (B) | 0 (W) | 0 (B) | 0 (W) | 0.5 (B) | 1 (W) | 3.5 |
| 50 | (United States) Dalton Perrine | 2217 | 0 (B) | 0.5 (W) | 1 (B) | 0 (B) | 1 (W) | 0 (W) | 1 (B) | 3.5 |
| 51 | (Canada) Raja Panjwani | 2385 | 1 (B) | 0.5 (W) | 0 (B) | 0.5 (W) | 0.5 (B) | 1 (W) | 0 (B) | 3.5 |
| 52 | (France) Dina Belenkaya | 2168 | 0 (W) | 1 (B) | 0 (W) | 1 (B) | 0 (W) | 0.5 (B) | 1 (W) | 3.5 |
| 53 | (United States) Ron Henley | 2385 | 0 (W) | 0 (B) | 0.5 (W) | 1 (B) | 0.5 (W) | 1 (B) | 0.5 (W) | 3.5 |
| 54 | (United States) Matthew O'Brien | 0 | 1 (W) | 0.5 (B) | 0 (W) | 0.5 (B) | 1 (B) | 0 (W) | 0 (B) | 3 |
| 55 | (United States) Isaac Spence | 2118 | 0.5 (B) | 0 (W) | 1 (B) | 0 (B) | 0.5 (W) | 0 (W) | 1 (B) | 3 |
| 56 | (United States) Atulya Vaidya | 0 | 1 (B) | 0 (W) | 0.5 (B) | 1 (W) | 0 (B) | 0.5 (W) | 0 (B) | 3 |
| 57 | (Uzbekistan) Mukhiddin Madaminov | 2501 | 1 (B) | 1 (W) | 0 (B) | 1 (W) | 0 (B) | 0 (W) | 0 (B) | 3 |
| 58 | (United States) Stuart Rachels | 0 | 0.5 (W) | 1 (B) | 0.5 (B) | 0 (W) | 1 (B) | 0 (W) | 0 (B) | 3 |
| 59 | (United States) Graham Horobetz | 0 | 0 (B) | 1 (W) | 1 (B) | 0 (W) | 0.5 (B) | 0 (W) | 0.5 (B) | 3 |
| 60 | (United States) Emmanuel Carter | 2065 | 0.5 (B) | 0 (W) | 1 (B) | 0.5 (W) | 0 (B) | 1 (W) | 0 (B) | 3 |
| 61 | (United States) Alexander Crump | 2090 | 0 (W) | 1 (B) | 0 (W) | 0.5 (B) | 0.5 (B) | 0 (W) | 1 (B) | 3 |
| 62 | (United States) Artemii Khanbutaev | 0 | 0 (B) | 0 (W) | 1 (B) | 1 (W) | 0 (B) | 0 (W) | 1 (B) | 3 |
| 63 | (United States) Nitish Nathan | 0 | 0 (W) | 0 (B) | 0.5 (W) | 0 (W) | 1 (B) | 1 (B) | 0.5 (W) | 3 |
| 64 | (United States) Donald Johnson | 2224 | 0 (B) | 1 (W) | 0 (B) | 1 (W) | 0 (B) | 1 (W) | 0 (B) | 3 |
| 65 | (United States) Samuel Copeland | 0 | 1 (W) | 0 (B) | 0 (W) | 0 (B) | 0 (W) | 1 (B) | 1 (B) | 3 |
| 66 | (United States) Daniel Rensch | 2399 | 1 (W) | 0 (B) | 1 (W) | 0 (B) | 0 (W) | 0 (B) | 1 (W) | 3 |
| 67 | (United States) Shelev Oberoi | 2228 | 0 (B) | 1 (W) | 0 (B) | 0.5 (W) | 1 (B) | 0.5 (W) | 0 (B) | 3 |
| 68 | (United States) Ryan Amburgy | 0 | 0.5 (B) | 0.5 (W) | 0 (B) | 0 (W) | 0.5 (B) | 1 (W) | 0.5 (B) | 3 |
| 69 | (United States) Prateek Mishra | 0 | 0 (B) | 0.5 (W) | 0 (W) | 1 (B) | 0 (W) | 1 (B) | 0.5 (W) | 3 |
| 70 | (Austria) Thomas Bauer | 2066 | 0 (W) | 0 (B) | 0 (W) | 0 (W) | 1 (B) | 1 (B) | 1 (W) | 3 |
| 71 | (United States) John Bartholomew | 2443 | 0.5 (B) | 0 (W) | 0.5 (W) | 0 (B) | 1 (W) | 1 (B) | 0 (W) | 3 |
| 72 | (United States) Varun Krishnan | 0 | 0 (B) | 1 (W) | 0 (B) | 0.5 (W) | 0.5 (B) | 1 (W) | 0 (B) | 3 |
| 73 | (United States) Robby Adamson | 2241 | 1 (W) | 0 (B) | 0 (W) | 1 (B) | 0.5 (W) | 0 (B) | 0 (W) | 2.5 |
| 74 | (United States) Charles Troutman | 1925 | 0 (B) | Bye | 1 (W) | 0 (B) | 0.5 (W) | 0 (B) | 0 (W) | 2.5 |
| 75 | (Canada) Roman Gavrilin | 2136 | 0 (W) | 0 (B) | 1 (W) | 0.5 (B) | 0 (B) | 0 (W) | 1 (B) | 2.5 |
| 76 | (United States) Nick Matta | 2288 | 0 (W) | 0.5 (B) | 1 (W) | 0 (B) | 1 (W) | 0 (B) | 0 (W) | 2.5 |
| 77 | (India) Tushar Anand | 1995 | 0 (W) | 0.5 (B) | 0 (W) | 1 (B) | 0 (B) | 1 (W) | 0 (B) | 2.5 |
| 78 | (United States) Dominique Myers | 1987 | 1 (B) | 0.5 (W) | 0 (B) | 0 (W) | 0 (B) | 0 (W) | 0.5 (B) | 2 |
| 79 | (United States) Paul Iinuma | 2099 | 0.5 (W) | 0.5 (B) | 1 (W) | 0 (B) | 0 (W) | 0 (B) | 0 (W) | 2 |
| 80 | (United States) Mark Hyland | 1904 | Bye | 0 (W) | 0 (B) | 0 (W) | 1 (B) | 0 (B) | 0 (W) | 2 |
| 81 | (United States) Aaron Marian | 1711 | 1 (W) | 0 (B) | 0 (W) | 0 (B) | 1 (W) | 0 (B) | 0 (W) | 2 |
| 82 | (United States) Mark Biernacki | 1999 | 0 (B) | 0.5 (W) | 0.5 (B) | 0 (W) | 0 (B) | 0 (W) | 1 (W) | 2 |
| 83 | (United States) Robert Ramírez | 2087 | 0 (B) | 0 (W) | 0 (B) | 1 (W) | 1 (W) | 0 (B) | 0 (B) | 2 |
| 84 | (United States) Alex Chu | 2003 | 0 (W) | 0 (B) | 0 (W) | 1 (B) | 0.5 (W) | 0 (B) | 0.5 (W) | 2 |
| 85 | (United States) Doug Eckert | 2202 | 0 (B) | 0.5 (W) | 0 (B) | 0 (W) | 0 (W) | 1 (B) | 0.5 (W) | 2 |
| 86 | (United States) Justin Feng | 0 | 0 (B) | 0 (W) | 1 (B) | 0 (W) | 1 (B) | 0 (W) | 0 (B) | 2 |
| 87 | (India) Uthra Pakkirisamy | 1983 | 0 (W) | 0 (B) | Bye | 0 (W) | 0 (B) | 1 (B) | 0 (W) | 2 |
| 88 | (India) Magesh Panchanathan | 2441 | 0 (W) | 0.5 (B) | 0 (W) | 0 (W) | 0 (B) | 1 (W) | 0.5 (B) | 2 |
| 89 | (United States) Carter Peatman | 2079 | 0 (W) | 0 (B) | 0.5 (B) | 0 (W) | 1 (W) | 0 (B) | 0 (W) | 1.5 |
| 90 | (United States) Mike Sailer | 2145 | 0 (B) | 0 (W) | 1 (B) | 0 (W) | 0 (B) | 0 (W) | 0 (B) | 1 |
| 91 | (United States) Jonathan Pagan | 0 | 0 (B) | 0 (W) | 0 (B) | 0 (W) | 0 (W) | 0 (B) | 0.5 (W) | 0.5 |
| 92 | (United States) Jason Cigan | 2081 | 0 (W) | 0 (B) | 0 (W) | 0 (B) | 0 (W) | 0 (W) | 0.5 (B) | 0.5 |
| 93 | (United States) John Langreck | 2001 | 0 (B) | 0 (W) | 0 (B) | U | U | U | U | 0 |

==== First place play-off ====
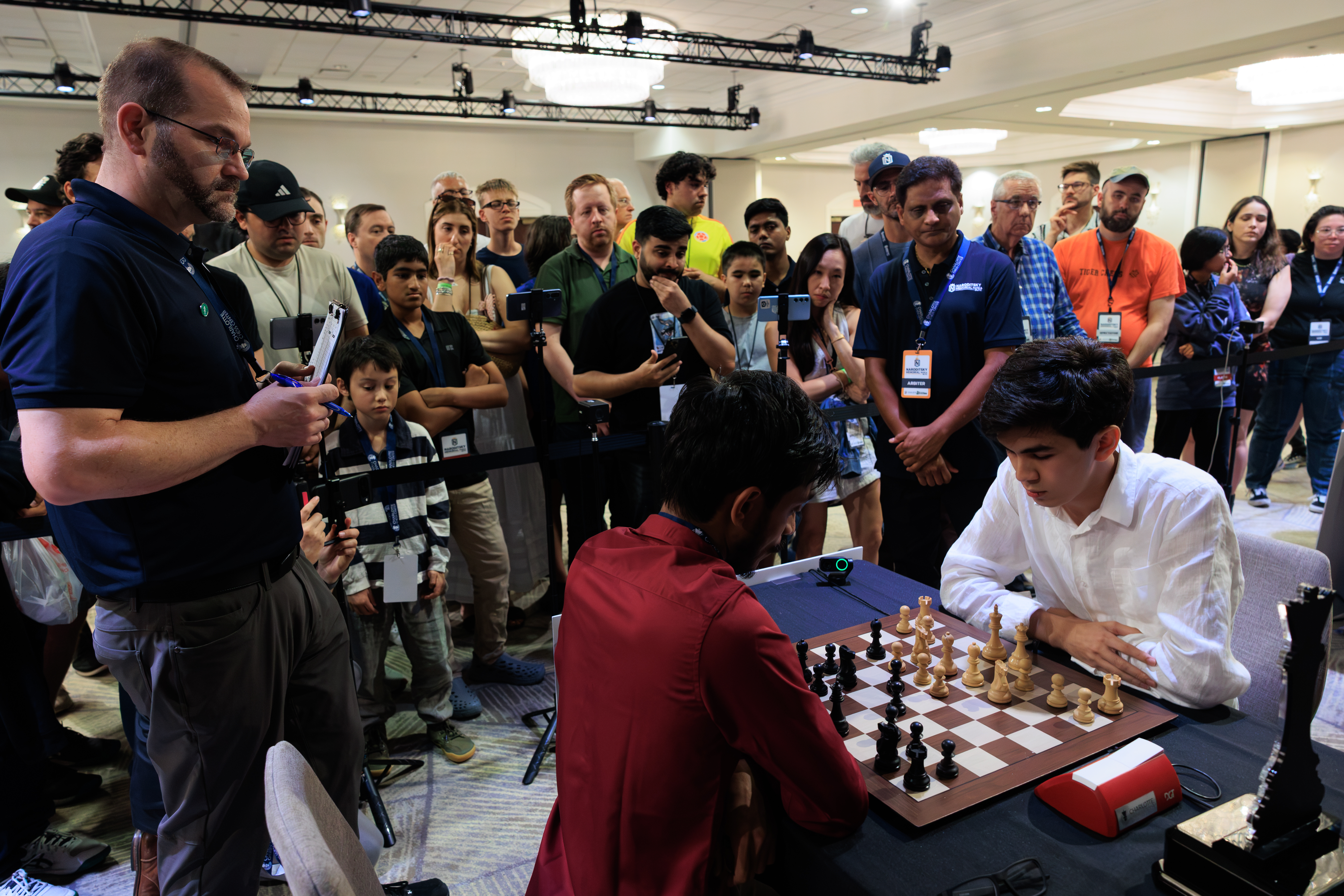
Javokhir Sindarov vs Aravindh Chithambaram play-off at the Rapid tournament.

The top two finishers of the Swiss stage with same points advanced to the blitz play-off for first place.

| Name | Blitz rating | 1 | 2 | Total |
|---|---|---|---|---|
| (Uzbekistan) Javokhir Sindarov | 2680 | 1 | 1 | 2 |
| (India) Aravindh Chithambaram | 2569 | 0 | 0 | 0 |

=== Challengers ===
Notation: "1 (W)" indicates a win (1 point) with white pieces (W). "U" indicates that the round was unplayed. The first tiebreak (labeled AROC-1) is the average rating of opponents "cut 1" (viz. excluding the lowest-rated opponent). The second tiebreak (labeled PS) is the Cummulative or Progressive.

| Rk. | Name | Elo | 1 | 2 | 3 | 4 | 5 | 6 | 7 | Total | AROC-1 | PS |
|---|---|---|---|---|---|---|---|---|---|---|---|---|
| 1 | (United States) Andrew Fletcher | 2106 | 1 (W) | 1 (B) | 1 (W) | 1 (B) | 1 (B) | 1 (W) | 0.5 (W) | 6.5 | 2059 | 27.5 |
| 2 | (United States) Andrew Wu | 2294 | 1 (B) | 0.5 (W) | 1 (B) | 1 (W) | 1 (B) | 1 (W) | 1 (B) | 6.5 | 2044 | 25 |
| 3 | (United States) Lukas Lebakken | 2153 | 1 (B) | 1 (W) | 0.5 (B) | 1 (W) | 1 (B) | 1 (W) | 0.5 (B) | 6 | 2052 | 25 |
| 4 | (United States) Ashwin Kumar | 2175 | 1 (W) | 0 (B) | 1 (W) | 1 (B) | 1 (W) | 1 (B) | 1 (W) | 6 | 1969 | 22 |
| 5 | (United States) Idan Eshkol | 2018 | 0.5 (B) | 1 (W) | 0.5 (B) | 1 (W) | 1 (B) | 1 (W) | 1 (B) | 6 | 1861 | 22 |
| 6 | (United States) Sanjay Kumar | 2091 | 1 (W) | 1 (B) | 1 (W) | 0 (B) | 1 (W) | 1 (B) | 0.5 (B) | 5.5 | 1994 | 23.5 |
| 7 | (United States) Ruben Quintans | 2081 | 1 (W) | 1 (B) | 0.5 (W) | 1 (B) | 1 (W) | 0 (B) | 1 (W) | 5.5 | 1980 | 23.5 |
| 8 | (United States) Alisa Melekhina | 2202 | 1 (W) | 0 (B) | 1 (W) | 1 (B) | 1 (W) | 0.5 (B) | 1 (W) | 5.5 | 1965 | 21 |
| 9 | (United States) Namish Kondabathini | 2113 | 1 (W) | 1 (B) | 0 (W) | 1 (B) | 1 (W) | 1 (B) | 0.5 (W) | 5.5 | 1960 | 22.5 |
| 10 | (United States) Varun Venkat | 2023 | 1 (W) | 1 (B) | 0.5 (W) | 1 (B) | 0 (B) | 1 (W) | 1 (W) | 5.5 | 1948 | 22.5 |
Total entries: 213 players

== Blitz tournament results ==
The blitz tournament was played from 4 to 5 July.

=== Day 1 – Swiss-system tournament ===
==== Masters ====
Notation: "0.5 (W)" indicates a draw (½ point) with white pieces (W). "U" indicates that the round was unplayed.

- : Advanced to Blitz Final
- : Advanced to Top ten places playoffs

| Rk. | Name | Elo | 1 | 2 | 3 | 4 | 5 | 6 | 7 | 8 | 9 | 10 | 11 | Total |
|---|---|---|---|---|---|---|---|---|---|---|---|---|---|---|
| 1 | (United States) Hikaru Nakamura | 2838 | 0.5 (W) | 1 (B) | 1 (W) | 1 (B) | 0.5 (W) | 0.5 (B) | 1 (W) | 1 (B) | 1 (W) | 0.5 (B) | 0.5 (W) | 8.5 |
| 2 | (Uzbekistan) Mukhiddin Madaminov | 2540 | 1 (W) | 1 (B) | 1 (W) | 0.5 (B) | 1 (W) | 0 (B) | 0.5 (W) | 1 (W) | 1 (B) | 0.5 (W) | 0.5 (W) | 8 |
| 3 | (United States) Ethan Sheehan | 2416 | 1 (W) | 1 (B) | 0 (W) | 0.5 (W) | 0.5 (B) | 1 (B) | 1 (W) | 1 (B) | 0 (W) | 1 (B) | 1 (W) | 8 |
| 4 | (Azerbaijan) Vasif Durarbayli | 2590 | 1 (B) | 1 (W) | 1 (B) | 1 (W) | 0.5 (B) | 1 (W) | 1 (B) | 0 (W) | 0.5 (B) | 0.5 (B) | 0.5 (W) | 8 |
| 5 | (United States) Samuel Sevian | 2677 | 1 (W) | 1 (B) | 1 (W) | 0 (B) | 1 (W) | 1 (B) | 0.5 (W) | 0.5 (W) | 0.5 (B) | 1 (W) | 0.5 (B) | 8 |
| 6 | (United States) Wesley So | 2772 | 1 (B) | 1 (W) | 0 (B) | 1 (W) | 1 (B) | 0 (W) | 1 (B) | 1 (W) | 1 (B) | 0.5 (W) | 0.5 (B) | 8 |
| 7 | (United States) Andy Woodward | 2496 | 1 (W) | 0 (B) | 1 (W) | 1 (B) | 1 (W) | 1 (B) | 0 (W) | 1 (B) | 0.5 (W) | 0.5 (B) | 1 (W) | 8 |
| 8 | (FIDE) Semen Khanin | 2456 | 1 (B) | 1 (W) | 0.5 (B) | 0 (W) | 0.5 (B) | 1 (W) | 1 (B) | 0.5 (W) | 1 (W) | 1 (B) | 0.5 (B) | 8 |
| 9 | (United States) Ray Robson | 2620 | 1 (W) | 1 (B) | 0.5 (W) | 0.5 (B) | 1 (W) | 0.5 (W) | 0.5 (B) | 0.5 (B) | 0 (W) | 1 (B) | 1 (W) | 7.5 |
| 10 | (United States) Leinier Domínguez | 2591 | 1 (W) | 0 (B) | 1 (W) | 0.5 (B) | 1 (W) | 1 (B) | 0.5 (W) | 0.5 (B) | 1 (W) | 0.5 (B) | 0.5 (W) | 7.5 |
| 11 | (Uzbekistan) Javokhir Sindarov | 2680 | 1 (W) | 0 (B) | 1 (W) | 0.5 (B) | 0.5 (W) | 1 (B) | 0.5 (B) | 1 (W) | 1 (B) | 0.5 (W) | 0.5 (B) | 7.5 |
| 12 | (Israel) Boris Gelfand | 2592 | 0.5 (B) | 1 (W) | 1 (B) | 1 (W) | 1 (B) | 0.5 (W) | 0.5 (B) | 0.5 (W) | 0 (W) | 0.5 (B) | 1 (W) | 7.5 |
| 13 | (United States) Andrew Tang | 2553 | 1 (W) | 1 (B) | 0 (W) | 0 (B) | 1 (W) | 1 (B) | 0 (W) | 1 (B) | 1 (W) | 0.5 (B) | 1 (W) | 7.5 |
| 14 | (Ukraine) Ruslan Ponomariov | 2609 | 1 (W) | 1 (B) | 1 (W) | 1 (B) | 0.5 (W) | 0.5 (B) | 1 (W) | 0.5 (B) | 0 (B) | 0.5 (W) | 0 (B) | 7 |
| 15 | (United States) Andrew Hong | 2519 | 1 (W) | 1 (B) | 1 (W) | 0 (W) | 1 (B) | 0 (B) | 1 (W) | 0 (B) | 0.5 (W) | 1 (B) | 0.5 (W) | 7 |
| 16 | (India) Aravindh Chithambaram | 2569 | 1 (W) | 1 (B) | 0.5 (W) | 1 (B) | 0 (W) | 0.5 (B) | 1 (W) | 0 (B) | 0.5 (W) | 1 (B) | 0.5 (B) | 7 |
| 17 | (Ukraine) Vasyl Ivanchuk | 2593 | 0.5 (B) | 0.5 (W) | 1 (B) | 1 (W) | 1 (B) | 0 (W) | 1 (B) | 0 (W) | 1 (B) | 0 (W) | 1 (B) | 7 |
| 18 | (United States) Eric Rosen | 2327 | 1 (W) | 0 (W) | 1 (B) | 0 (B) | 1 (W) | 0.5 (B) | 0 (W) | 1 (B) | 1 (W) | 1 (B) | 0.5 (W) | 7 |
| 19 | (Peru) Emilio Córdova | 2591 | 1 (B) | 1 (W) | 0 (B) | 0.5 (W) | 0 (B) | 0 (W) | 0.5 (B) | 1 (W) | 1 (B) | 1 (W) | 1 (W) | 7 |
| 20 | (Canada) Aman Hambleton | 2511 | | 1 (W) | 0.5 (B) | 0 (B) | 1 (W) | 0.5 (W) | 1 (B) | 0 (W) | 0 (B) | 1 (B) | 0.5 (W) | 6.5 |
| 21 | (United States) Nico Chasin | 2513 | 1 (W) | 1 (B) | 0 (W) | 1 (B) | 0 (W) | 1 (B) | 0 (W) | 1 (B) | 1 (W) | 0.5 (W) | 0 (B) | 6.5 |
| 22 | (United States) Grigoriy Oparin | 2670 | 1 (B) | 1 (W) | 1 (B) | 0.5 (W) | 0.5 (B) | 1 (W) | 0 (B) | 0 (W) | 0 (B) | 1 (W) | 0.5 (B) | 6.5 |
| 23 | (Azerbaijan) Aydin Suleymanli | 2559 | 0.5 (B) | 1 (W) | 1 (B) | 1 (W) | 0 (B) | 1 (W) | 0 (B) | 1 (W) | 0 (B) | 0 (W) | 1 (B) | 6.5 |
| 24 | (United States) Fabiano Caruana | 2773 | 1 (B) | 0 (W) | 1 (B) | 1 (W) | 0 (W) | 1 (B) | 1 (W) | 1 (B) | 0.5 (W) | 0 (B) | 0 (B) | 6.5 |
| 25 | (Ukraine) Olexandr Bortnyk | 2708 | 1 (B) | 1 (W) | 0 (B) | 0.5 (W) | 0 (B) | 1 (W) | 1 (B) | 1 (W) | 0 (B) | 0 (W) | 1 (B) | 6.5 |
| 26 | (United States) Mark Heimann | 2411 | 1 (B) | 0 (W) | 1 (B) | 0.5 (W) | 0 (B) | 0.5 (W) | 1 (B) | 1 (W) | 1 (B) | 0.5 (W) | 0 (B) | 6.5 |
| 27 | (Indonesia) Irene Sukandar | 2270 | 0.5 (B) | 0.5 (W) | 1 (B) | 1 (W) | 0 (B) | 0 (W) | 0 (B) | 1 (W) | 1 (B) | 1 (W) | 0.5 (B) | 6.5 |
| 28 | (Netherlands) Robby Kevlishvili | 2549 | 1 (B) | 0.5 (W) | 1 (B) | 0 (W) | 1 (B) | 0.5 (W) | 0 (B) | 1 (W) | 0.5 (B) | 0 (W) | 1 (B) | 6.5 |
| 29 | (United States) Donald Johnson | 2123 | 0 (W) | 1 (B) | 1 (W) | 0 (W) | 0 (B) | 1 (B) | 0.5 (W) | 1 (B) | 0 (W) | 1 (B) | 1 (W) | 6.5 |
| 30 | (United States) Awonder Liang | 2588 | 1 (B) | 0 (W) | 0 (B) | 1 (W) | 1 (B) | 0.5 (W) | 1 (B) | 0 (B) | 1 (W) | 1 (W) | 0 (B) | 6.5 |
| 31 | (Latvia) Arturs Neikšāns | 2553 | 0.5 (B) | 0 (W) | 0.5 (B) | 1 (W) | 1 (B) | 1 (W) | 0 (B) | 1 (W) | 0.5 (B) | 0 (W) | 1 (B) | 6.5 |
| 32 | (United States) Andrew Jiang | 2183 | 0 (W) | 1 (B) | 0 (B) | 0 (W) | 1 (B) | 1 (W) | 1 (B) | 0.5 (W) | 0 (B) | 1 (W) | 1 (B) | 6.5 |
| 33 | (India) Ashwin Jayaram | 2461 | 0.5 (B) | 1 (W) | 0 (B) | 1 (W) | 0 (W) | 0 (B) | 1 (B) | 1 (W) | 1 (B) | 0 (W) | 1 (W) | 6.5 |
| 34 | (India) Gauri Shankar | 2188 | 1 (B) | 1 (W) | 0.5 (B) | 0.5 (W) | 0 (B) | 0 (W) | 1 (B) | 0 (B) | 1 (W) | 1 (W) | 0 (B) | 6 |
| 35 | (United States) Benjamin Moon | 2187 | 0.5 (W) | 0 (B) | 0.5 (W) | 1 (B) | 1 (W) | 0 (B) | 1 (W) | 0 (B) | 0 (W) | | 1 (B) | 6 |
| 36 | (India) Aarav Dengla | 2303 | 1 (B) | 1 (W) | 0 (B) | 1 (W) | 0 (B) | 1 (W) | 0 (B) | 0 (W) | 1 (B) | 1 (W) | 0 (W) | 6 |
| 37 | (Canada) Raja Panjwani | 2395 | 1 (W) | 0 (W) | 1 (B) | 0.5 (B) | 1 (W) | 0 (B) | 1 (W) | 0 (B) | 0.5 (W) | 0 (B) | 1 (B) | 6 |
| 38 | (Peru) Brian Ramírez | 2341 | 1 (W) | 0 (B) | 1 (W) | 0 (B) | 0 (W) | 1 (B) | 1 (W) | 1 (B) | 0 (W) | 0 (B) | 1 (W) | 6 |
| 39 | (United States) Ryan Amburgy | 2092 | 0 (W) | 1 (B) | 0 (W) | 1 (B) | 0 (W) | 1 (B) | 1 (B) | 0 (W) | 0 (B) | 1 (W) | 1 (B) | 6 |
| 40 | (United States) Atulya Vaidya | 0 | 0 (B) | 1 (W) | 0 (B) | 0 (W) | 1 (B) | 0 (W) | 0 (B) | 1 (B) | 1 (W) | 1 (W) | 1 (B) | 6 |
| 41 | (United States) Zachary Tanenbaum | 2266 | 0 (W) | 0 (B) | 1 (W) | 0 (B) | 1 (W) | 1 (B) | 0 (W) | 1 (B) | 0 (W) | 1 (B) | 1 (B) | 6 |
| 42 | (India) Naveen Prabhu | 2138 | 0 (B) | 1 (W) | 0 (B) | 1 (W) | 1 (B) | 0 (W) | 1 (B) | 0 (W) | 0.5 (B) | 0 (B) | 1 (W) | 5.5 |
| 43 | (United States) Dalton Perrine | 2239 | 0.5 (W) | 0 (B) | 1 (W) | 0 (B) | 1 (W) | 1 (B) | 0.5 (W) | 0 (B) | 0.5 (W) | 0 (B) | 1 (W) | 5.5 |
| 44 | (United States) Emmanuel Carter | 2042 | 0.5 (B) | 0 (W) | 0 (B) | 1 (W) | 1 (B) | 0 (W) | 1 (B) | 1 (W) | 0.5 (B) | 0.5 (W) | 0 (B) | 5.5 |
| 45 | (United States) Eric Liu | 2428 | 0.5 (W) | 0.5 (B) | 1 (W) | 0 (B) | 1 (W) | 1 (B) | 0 (W) | 0.5 (B) | 0 (B) | 1 (W) | 0 (W) | 5.5 |
| 46 | (United States) Varun Krishnan | 2301 | 1 (W) | 0 (B) | 0 (W) | 1 (B) | 1 (W) | 0 (W) | 0.5 (B) | 1 (B) | 1 (W) | 0 (B) | 0 (W) | 5.5 |
| 47 | (Uzbekistan) Islombek Sindarov | 2322 | 0 (B) | 0 (W) | 1 (B) | 1 (W) | 1 (B) | 1 (W) | 0 (B) | 0 (W) | 0 (B) | 0.5 (W) | 1 (B) | 5.5 |
| 48 | (United States) Alex Chu | 2071 | 1 (W) | 0 (B) | 0 (W) | 0 (B) | 0 (W) | 1 (B) | 1 (W) | 0 (B) | 0.5 (W) | 1 (B) | 1 (W) | 5.5 |
| 49 | (United States) Shelev Oberoi | 2331 | 0 (W) | 1 (B) | 1 (W) | 0.5 (B) | 0.5 (W) | 0 (B) | 0.5 (W) | 0 (B) | 0.5 (W) | 0.5 (B) | 1 (W) | 5.5 |
| 50 | (United States) Artemii Khanbutaev | 2063 | 1 (B) | 0 (W) | 0 (B) | 0 (W) | 0 (B) | 1 (W) | 0.5 (W) | 1 (B) | 1 (W) | 1 (B) | 0 (W) | 5.5 |
| 51 | (United States) Steven Zierk | 2488 | 1 (W) | 0 (B) | 1 (W) | 1 (B) | 0 (W) | 0 (B) | 0 (W) | 1 (W) | 1 (B) | 0.5 (B) | 0 (W) | 5.5 |
| 52 | (United States) Daniel Rensch | 2401 | 1 (B) | 0 (W) | 1 (B) | 0 (W) | 0 (B) | 1 (W) | 0 (B) | 1 (W) | 0.5 (B) | 1 (W) | 0 (W) | 5.5 |
| 53 | (Finland) Teemu Virtanen | 2184 | 0 (B) | 1 (W) | 0 (B) | 1 (W) | 0 (B) | 1 (W) | 0 (B) | 0 (W) | 0.5 (B) | 1 (W) | 1 (B) | 5.5 |
| 54 | (United States) Prateek Mishra | 0 | | 1 (B) | 0 (W) | 0.5 (B) | 1 (W) | 0.5 (B) | 1 (W) | 1 (B) | 0 (W) | 0 (B) | 0 (W) | 5 |
| 55 | (United States) Robert Hess | 2557 | 1 (W) | 1 (B) | 0.5 (W) | 0 (B) | 1 (W) | 0.5 (B) | 0 (W) | 1 (B) | 0 (W) | 0 (B) | 0 (W) | 5 |
| 56 | (United States) Graham Horobetz | 2205 | 0.5 (W) | 0 (B) | 1 (W) | 1 (B) | 0 (W) | 0.5 (B) | 0 (W) | 0 (B) | 0 (W) | 1 (B) | 1 (W) | 5 |
| 57 | (United States) Kayden Troff | 2576 | 0 (W) | 1 (B) | 1 (W) | 0.5 (B) | 1 (W) | 0 (W) | 0.5 (B) | 0 (B) | 1 (W) | 0 (B) | 0 (W) | 5 |
| 58 | (India) Tushar Anand | 1953 | 0 (W) | 0 (B) | 0 (W) | 0 (B) | 1 (W) | 1 (B) | 1 (W) | 1 (B) | 0 (W) | 1 (B) | 0 (W) | 5 |
| 59 | (United States) Nick Matta | 2281 | 0 (B) | 0.5 (W) | 1 (B) | 1 (W) | 0 (B) | 1 (W) | 0 (W) | 0 (B) | 0.5 (W) | 0 (B) | 1 (W) | 5 |
| 60 | (United States) Levy Rozman | 2366 | 0 (B) | 1 (W) | 1 (B) | 0.5 (W) | 0 (B) | 0.5 (W) | 1 (B) | 0 (W) | 1 (B) | 0 (W) | 0 (B) | 5 |
| 61 | (United States) Kostya Kavutskiy | 2278 | 1 (W) | 0 (W) | 0 (B) | 1 (B) | 0 (W) | 1 (B) | 0 (W) | 0 (W) | 1 (B) | 1 (B) | 0 (W) | 5 |
| 62 | (India) Magesh Panchanathan | 2438 | 0 (B) | 1 (W) | 0 (B) | 1 (W) | 0 (B) | 0.5 (W) | 0 (B) | 0.5 (W) | 0 (B) | 1 (W) | 1 (B) | 5 |
| 63 | (United States) Alexander Jasinski | 2127 | 0.5 (W) | 0.5 (B) | 1 (W) | 0 (B) | 1 (W) | 0 (B) | 0 (W) | 1 (B) | 0 (W) | 0.5 (B) | 0 (B) | 4.5 |
| 64 | (United States) Paul Iinuma | 2087 | 0 (W) | 0.5 (B) | 1 (W) | 1 (W) | 1 (B) | 0 (W) | 0 (B) | 0 (W) | 1 (B) | 0 (B) | 0 (W) | 4.5 |
| 65 | (United States) Robert Ramírez | 2057 | 0 (B) | 0 (W) | 0 (B) | 1 (B) | 0.5 (W) | 1 (W) | 1 (B) | 1 (W) | 0 (B) | 0 (W) | 0 (B) | 4.5 |
| 66 | (Canada) Roman Gavrilin | 2165 | 0 (W) | 0.5 (B) | 0.5 (W) | 0 (B) | 1 (B) | 0 (W) | 0 (B) | 1 (W) | 1 (W) | 0 (B) | 0.5 (W) | 4.5 |
| 67 | (United States) Alexander Crump | 2216 | 0 (B) | 1 (W) | 0 (B) | 1 (W) | 1 (B) | 0 (W) | 0.5 (B) | 0 (W) | 1 (B) | 0 (W) | 0 (B) | 4.5 |
| 68 | (United States) Mark Biernacki | 1997 | 0 (B) | 0 (B) | 1 (W) | 1 (W) | 0 (B) | 0 (W) | 0.5 (B) | 0 (W) | 0 (B) | 1 (W) | 1 (B) | 4.5 |
| 69 | (United States) Nitish Nathan | 0 | 0 (W) | 1 (B) | 0 (W) | 0 (B) | 0.5 (B) | 1 (W) | 1 (B) | 0 (W) | 0.5 (B) | 0.5 (W) | 0 (B) | 4.5 |
| 70 | (United States) Jason Cigan | 2013 | 0 (W) | 1 (B) | 1 (W) | 0 (W) | 0 (B) | 0.5 (B) | 0 (W) | 0 (B) | 1 (W) | 0 (W) | 1 (B) | 4.5 |
| 71 | (United States) Carter Peatman | 2003 | 0 (W) | 0.5 (B) | 0 (W) | 0 (B) | 0 (B) | 1 (W) | 1 (W) | 0 (B) | 1 (W) | 1 (B) | 0 (W) | 4.5 |
| 72 | (United States) Isaac Spence | 2214 | 0 (W) | 0 (B) | 1 (W) | 0 (B) | 0.5 (W) | 1 (B) | 0 (W) | 1 (B) | 0 (W) | 0 (W) | 1 (B) | 4.5 |
| 73 | (United States) Robby Adamson | 2302 | 0 (B) | 0.5 (W) | 0.5 (B) | 0.5 (W) | 1 (B) | 0 (B) | 0 (W) | 1 (W) | 1 (B) | 0 (W) | 0 (B) | 4.5 |
| 74 | (United States) Charles Troutman | 1924 | 1 (W) | 0.5 (B) | 0 (W) | 0 (W) | 0 (B) | 0 (B) | 0 (W) | 1 (B) | 0.5 (B) | 1 (W) | 0 (B) | 4 |
| 75 | (United States) Zubin Baliga | 1926 | 1 (W) | 0 (W) | 1 (B) | 0 (B) | 0 (W) | 0 (B) | 0 (W) | 0 (B) | 1 (W) | 1 (B) | 0 (W) | 4 |
| 76 | (United States) Matthew O'Brien | 0 | 1 (W) | 0 (B) | 0 (W) | 1 (B) | 0 (W) | 0 (B) | 1 (W) | 0 (B) | 1 (W) | 0 (W) | 0 (B) | 4 |
| 77 | (United States) Jonathan Pagan | 2094 | 0 (B) | 0 (B) | 1 (W) | 0 (W) | 0.5 (B) | 1 (B) | 0 (W) | 0.5 (B) | 0 (W) | 0 (W) | 1 (B) | 4 |
| 78 | (United States) Aaron Marian | 1944 | 1 (W) | 0 (B) | 0 (W) | 1 (B) | 0 (W) | 0 (B) | 1 (W) | 0 (W) | 1 (B) | | U | 4 |
| 79 | (Austria) Thomas Bauer | 2196 | 0 (B) | 0 (W) | 1 (B) | 0 (B) | 0 (W) | 0 (B) | 0 (W) | 1 (W) | 0 (B) | 1 (W) | 1 (B) | 4 |
| 80 | (United States) Kiren Nasta | 2015 | 0 (B) | 1 (B) | 0 (W) | 0 (W) | 0 (B) | 0 (W) | 1 (B) | 1 (W) | 0 (B) | 0 (W) | 1 (B) | 4 |
| 81 | (France) Julien Song | 2227 | 0 (B) | 0 (W) | 0 (B) | 1 (W) | 0.5 (B) | 0 (W) | 1 (B) | 1 (W) | 0 (B) | 0 (W) | 0.5 (B) | 4 |
| 82 | (United States) Samuel Copeland | 2137 | 0.5 (W) | 1 (B) | 0 (W) | 0 (B) | 0 (W) | 1 (B) | 1 (W) | 0 (B) | 0 (W) | 0 (B) | 0 (W) | 3.5 |
| 83 | (United States) Justin Feng | 0 | 0 (W) | 0 (B) | 0 (W) | 1 (B) | 1 (W) | 1 (B) | 0.5 (W) | 0 (B) | 0 (W) | 0 (B) | 0 (W) | 3.5 |
| 84 | (India) Sagar Shah | 2307 | 0 (B) | 0.5 (W) | 0 (B) | 1 (W) | 0 (B) | 0 (W) | 0 (B) | 0 (W) | 1 (B) | 1 (W) | 0 (W) | 3.5 |
| 85 | (United States) Michael Mahoney | 0 | 0 (B) | 0 (B) | 1 (W) | 0 (B) | 0.5 (W) | 0 (W) | 1 (B) | 0 (W) | 0 (B) | 0.5 (B) | 0 (W) | 3 |
| 86 | (United States) Dominique Myers | 2050 | 0 (B) | 0 (W) | 0 (B) | 1 (B) | 0 (W) | 0 (B) | 0 (W) | 0.5 (W) | 0.5 (B) | 0 (B) | 1 (W) | 3 |
| 87 | (France) Dina Belenkaya | 2120 | 0 (B) | 1 (W) | 0 (B) | 0 (W) | 1 (B) | 0 (W) | 0 (B) | 1 (W) | 0 (B) | 0 (B) | 0 (W) | 3 |
| 88 | (United States) Ron Henley | 2392 | 0 (B) | 0 (W) | 0 (B) | 0 (W) | 0 (B) | 1 (W) | 1 (B) | 0 (W) | 0.5 (B) | 0.5 (W) | U | 3 |
| 89 | (India) Uthra Pakkirisamy | 1862 | 0 (B) | Bye | 0 (W) | 0 (B) | 0 (W) | 0 (B) | 0 (W) | 0.5 (B) | 0 (W) | 0 (W) | 1 (B) | 2.5 |
| 90 | (United States) Mark Hyland | 0 | Bye | 0 (W) | 0 (B) | 0 (B) | 1 (W) | 0 (W) | 0 (B) | 0 (B) | 0.5 (W) | 0 (B) | 0 (B) | 2.5 |
| 91 | (United States) Stuart Rachels | 2440 | 0 (B) | 0 (W) | 0 (B) | 0 (W) | 1 (B) | 0 (W) | 1 (B) | 0 (B) | 0.5 (W) | 0 (B) | 0 (W) | 2.5 |
| 92 | (United States) Mike Sailer | 2109 | 0 (B) | 0 (W) | 0 (B) | 0 (W) | 0 (W) | 0 (B) | 0 (W) | 0 (B) | 0.5 (W) | 1 (B) | 0 (W) | 1.5 |
| 93 | (United States) John Langreck | 1829 | 0 (B) | 0 (W) | Bye | U | U | U | U | U | U | U | U | 1 |

===== Top ten places play-off =====
The five players tied for tenth place advanced to an Armageddon play-off of single elimination format, to determine the two remaining qualifiers for the Blitz Final. Players were seeded according to the standings after applying the mathematical tiebreaks.

Quarterfinals
(United States) Ray Robson | Bye
Bye 1
(Israel) Boris Gelfand | Win
(United States) Andrew Tang | Loss
(Uzbekistan) Javokhir Sindarov | Bye
Bye 3
(United States) Leinier Domínguez | Bye
Bye 2

Semifinals
(United States) Ray Robson | Loss
(Israel) Boris Gelfand | Win
(Uzbekistan) Javokhir Sindarov (Note: A draw is a win for black in Armageddon.) | Draw
(United States) Leinier Domínguez | Draw

Finals
(Israel) Boris Gelfand
(Uzbekistan) Javokhir Sindarov

==== Challengers ====
Notation: "1 (W)" indicates a win (1 point) with white pieces (W). "U" indicates that the round was unplayed. The first tiebreak (labeled AROC-1) is the average rating of opponents "cut 1" (viz. excluding the lowest-rated opponent). The second tiebreak (labeled PS) is the Cummulative or Progressive.

| Rk. | Name | Elo | 1 | 2 | 3 | 4 | 5 | 6 | 7 | 8 | 9 | 10 | 11 | Total | AROC-1 | PS |
|---|---|---|---|---|---|---|---|---|---|---|---|---|---|---|---|---|
| 1 | (United States) Andrew Wu | 2294 | 1 (W) | 1 (B) | 1 (W) | 1 (B) | 1 (W) | 1 (B) | 0 (W) | 1 (B) | 1 (W) | 0.5 (B) | 1 (W) | 9.5 | 2071 | 60 |
| 2 | (United States) Ashwin Kumar | 2175 | 1 (B) | 1 (W) | 1 (B) | 1 (W) | 0 (B) | 1 (W) | 1 (B) | 1 (W) | 1 (W) | 0.5 (B) | 0.5 (W) | 9 | 2059 | 57.5 |
| 3 | (United States) Varun Venkat | 2023 | 0 (B) | 1 (W) | 1 (B) | 1 (W) | 1 (B) | 1 (W) | 1 (B) | 0 (W) | 1 (W) | 1 (B) | 1 (W) | 9 | 1930 | 51 |
| 4 | (United States) David Siamon | 2105 | 1 (B) | 1 (W) | 1 (B) | 1 (W) | 0 (B) | 1 (W) | 1 (B) | 1 (W) | 1 (B) | 0.5 (W) | 0 (B) | 8.5 | 2039 | 57 |
| 5 | (United States) Josh Smith | 2084 | 1 (W) | 1 (B) | 1 (W) | 0 (B) | 1 (W) | 0.5 (B) | 1 (W) | 1 (W) | 1 (B) | 0.5 (W) | 0.5 (B) | 8.5 | 2009 | 53.5 |
| 6 | (United States) Walker Gilbert | 2000 | 1 (W) | 1 (B) | 1 (W) | 1 (B) | 0 (W) | 1 (B) | 1 (W) | 0 (B) | 1 (W) | 1 (W) | 0.5 (B) | 8.5 | 1998 | 54.5 |
| 7 | (United States) Musa Naushad | 1969 | 1 (W) | 1 (B) | 1 (W) | 0 (B) | 1 (W) | 0 (B) | 1 (W) | 1 (B) | 1 (W) | 1 (B) | 0.5 (W) | 8.5 | 1943 | 51.5 |
| 8 | (United States) Ruben Quintans | 2081 | 1 (B) | 1 (W) | 0 (B) | 1 (W) | 1 (B) | 1 (W) | 0 (B) | 1 (W) | 1 (B) | 0.5 (W) | 1 (B) | 8.5 | 1942 | 51 |
| 9 | (United States) Kishan Karthigeyan | 2091 | 1 (W) | 1 (B) | 0 (W) | 1 (B) | 0 (W) | 1 (B) | 0.5 (W) | 1 (B) | 1 (W) | 1 (B) | 1 (W) | 8.5 | 1902 | 47.5 |
| 10 | (United States) Tanay Sanghani | 2129 | 1 (W) | 1 (B) | 0.5 (W) | 1 (B) | 0 (W) | 0.5 (B) | 1 (W) | 0.5 (B) | 1 (W) | 1 (W) | 1 (B) | 8.5 | 1890 | 49.5 |
Total entries: 217 players

=== Day 2 – Blitz Final ===
2026 Narodistky Memorial – Blitz Final, 5 July, Charlotte, North Carolina, United States
| | Player | Rating | 1 | 2 | 3 | 4 | 5 | 6 | 7 | 8 | 9 | 10 | Points |
|---|---|---|---|---|---|---|---|---|---|---|---|---|---|
| 1 | GM Javokhir Sindarov (Uzbekistan) | 2680 | | ½ | 1 | 1 | ½ | ½ | 1 | 1 | 1 | 1 | 7½ |
| 2 | GM Wesley So (United States) | 2772 | ½ | | 1 | 0 | 1 | 1 | 1 | ½ | 1 | 1 | 7 |
| 3 | Ethan Sheehan (United States) | 2416 | 0 | 0 | | ½ | 1 | 1 | 1 | ½ | 1 | 1 | 6 |
| 4 | GM Andy Woodward (United States) | 2496 | 0 | 1 | ½ | | 0 | 1 | 0 | 1 | 1 | 1 | 5½ |
| 5 | GM Hikaru Nakamura (United States) | 2838 | ½ | 0 | 0 | 1 | | 0 | 1 | ½ | 1 | 1 | 5 |
| 6 | GM Mukhiddin Madaminov (Uzbekistan) | 2540 | ½ | 0 | 0 | 0 | 1 | | 1 | 1 | 0 | 1 | 4½ |
| 7 | GM Samuel Sevian (United States) | 2677 | 0 | 0 | 0 | 1 | 0 | 0 | | ½ | 1 | ½ | 3 |
| 8 | GM Boris Gelfand (Israel) | 2592 | 0 | ½ | ½ | 0 | ½ | 0 | ½ | | 0 | 1 | 3 |
| 9 | GM Semen Khanin (FIDE) | 2456 | 0 | 0 | 0 | 0 | 0 | 1 | 0 | 1 | | 0 | 2 |
| 10 | GM Vasif Durarbayli (Azerbaijan) | 2590 | 0 | 0 | 0 | 0 | 0 | 0 | ½ | 0 | 1 | | 1½ |

== Creator Invitational ==
2026 Naroditsky Memorial – Creator Invitational, 5 July, Charlotte, North Carolina, United States
| | Player | Blitz Rating | 1 | 2 | 3 | 4 | 5 | 6 | 7 | 8 | 9 | 10 | Points |
|---|---|---|---|---|---|---|---|---|---|---|---|---|---|
| 1 | IM John Bartholomew (United States) | 2411 | | 1 | 1 | 1 | 1 | 1 | 1 | 1 | 1 | 1 | 9 |
| 2 | IM Levy Rozman (United States) | 2366 | 0 | | 1 | 0 | 1 | 1 | 1 | 1 | 1 | 1 | 7 |
| 3 | IM Daniel Rensch (United States) | 2401 | 0 | 0 | | 1 | 1 | 1 | 0 | 1 | 1 | 1 | 6 |
| 4 | WGM Dina Belenkaya (France) | 2120 | 0 | 1 | 0 | | 0 | ½ | 1 | 1 | 1 | 1 | 5½ |
| 5 | GM Aman Hambleton (Canada) | 2511 | 0 | 0 | 0 | 1 | | 0 | 1 | 1 | 1 | 1 | 5 |
| 6 | IM Julien Song (France) | 2227 | 0 | 0 | 0 | ½ | 1 | | 0 | 1 | 1 | 1 | 4½ |
| 7 | IM Eric Rosen (United States) | 2327 | 0 | 0 | 1 | 0 | 0 | 1 | | 1 | 0 | 1 | 4 |
| 8 | IM Sagar Shah (India) | 2307 | 0 | 0 | 0 | 0 | 0 | 0 | 0 | | 1 | 1 | 2 |
| 9 | WFM Alexandra Botez (Canada) | 2066 | 0 | 0 | 0 | 0 | 0 | 0 | 1 | 0 | | ½ | 1½ |
| 10 | Andrea Botez (Canada) | 1870 | 0 | 0 | 0 | 0 | 0 | 0 | 0 | 0 | ½ | | ½ |
