= Ron Henley =

Ron Henley may refer to:

- Ron Henley (chess player) (born 1956), American chess grandmaster
- Ron Henley (rapper) (born 1986), Filipino hip hop artist
- Ron Henley, keyboard player for the Liverpool Five
