= Levy Rozman =

American chess player and commentator (born 1995)

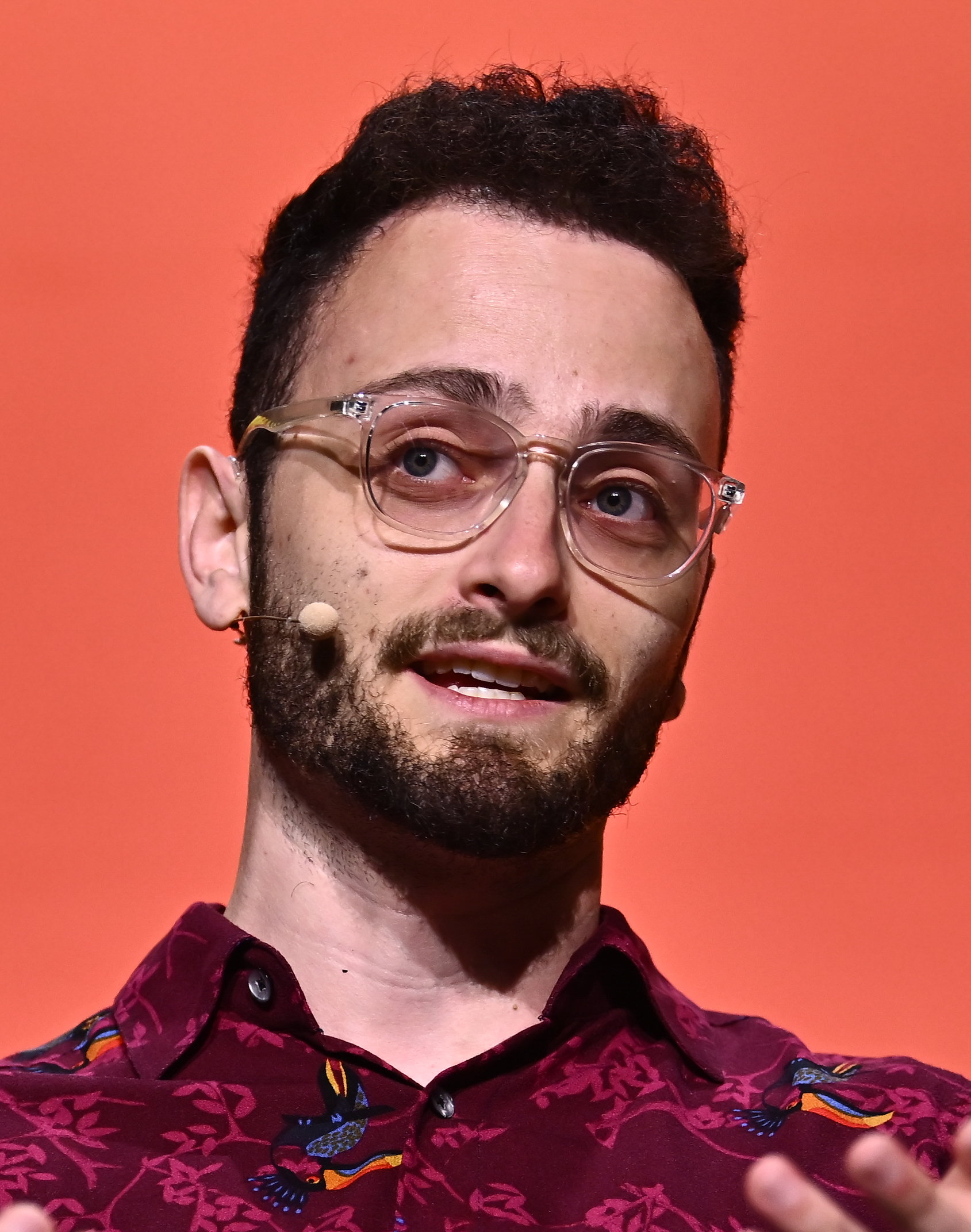
- Rozman in 2024
- Born: December 5, 1995 (age 30); Brooklyn, New York, U.S.
- Other names: GothamChess; Gotham; The Internet's Chess Teacher
- Education: Baruch College (BS)
- Spouse: Lucy Rozman (m. 2021)
- Chess career
- Title: International Master (2018)
- Years active: 2001–2022, 2024–present
- FIDE rating: 2318 (February 2026)
- Peak rating: 2421 (August 2018)

Twitch information
- Years active: 2018–present
- Followers: 1.2 million

YouTube information
- Years active: 2018–present
- Genre: Online chess
- Subscribers: 8.2 million
- Views: 6.3 billion
- Last updated: October 13, 2026
- Website: chessly.com

Levy Rozman (/ˈlɛvi ˈrɒzmən/, LEV-ee ROZ-mən; born December 5, 1995), known online as GothamChess, is an American chess international master, content creator, and author. Often referred to as "The Internet's Chess Teacher", he produces content on the online platforms Twitch, Facebook, TikTok, Instagram, and YouTube.

Rozman began streaming on Twitch in August 2018. His YouTube channel gained rapid popularity during the COVID-19 pandemic and the release of The Queen's Gambit in 2020. His YouTube channel became the first chess channel to surpass one billion views.

In 2018, Rozman earned the title of International Master and achieved his peak Elo rating of 2421. From July 2022 to April 2024, Rozman stepped away from competitive chess, before resuming pursuit of his goal to become a grandmaster.

== Early life ==
Levy Rozman was born on December 5, 1995, in Brooklyn, New York, to Russian émigrée Lina (née Zeldovich) and Ukrainian émigré Eugene Rozman. As a first-generation American, Rozman grew up speaking Russian at home and only started learning English in preschool. He lived back and forth between New Jersey and New York growing up.

Rozman was an energetic child, described by his mother as "a bit of a bruiser on the playground." At the age of five, his parents enrolled him in chess classes and noticed that the game had a calming effect on him. Rozman entered his first chess tournament at the age of seven. In February 2008, at twelve years old, Rozman achieved a FIDE rating of 2000 but progress stalled for three years. After contemplating quitting chess, he returned to the game consistently at the age of 15.

== Chess career ==
At the age of 16 in 2011, Rozman achieved the title of National Master through the US Chess Federation. While attending Baruch College in Manhattan, he pursued a bachelor's degree in statistics and quantitative modeling, with plans to secure a "serious job" after finishing his involvement in playing and teaching chess. In 2014, a year into his degree, he approached local schools to propose running his own chess program that involved coaching kids for tournaments and secured city and state titles with the students.

Between 2016 and 2019, Rozman committed himself to competitive chess. He obtained the title of FIDE Master in 2016 and International Master (IM) in 2018. In 2018, he reached his peak US Chess rating of 2520 and a FIDE rating of 2421. In July 2022, following a disappointing performance at the New York Summer Invitational tournament, Rozman announced his retirement from "competitive chess events" due to physical and mental stress. He announced his return to competitive over-the-board chess in April 2024, with the goal of becoming a Grandmaster (GM).

In July 2026, Rozman participated in the Naroditsky Memorial 2026 where he placed second in the Creator Invitational with a score of 7/9, two points behind the winner John Bartholomew.

== Content creation ==
While working to attain the title of Grandmaster, Rozman began streaming on his own Twitch channel on May 19, 2018. His streams mainly focused on instructional videos and chess commentary. Despite having only 10 followers at the time, he spent extensive hours online, sometimes streaming from 9pm to 4am. His first notable surge in viewership occurred in November 2018 during the World Chess Championship between Fabiano Caruana and Magnus Carlsen. Rozman expanded his online presence further by launching his YouTube channel a few months into the COVID-19 pandemic. Similar to many online chess personalities, he experienced a viewership surge during the pandemic, particularly following the release of the TV miniseries The Queen's Gambit. After leaving his role as a chess teacher, Rozman became a full-time streamer. By October 2020, his Twitch channel amassed over 100,000 followers, a significant increase from the just over 17,800 followers in early 2020. In January 2021, he ranked as the third-largest chess streamer on Twitch with 200,000 followers. Simultaneously, his YouTube channel saw substantial growth, reaching 379,000 subscribers.

In March 2021, Rozman gained international attention when he faced a loss in a Chess.com match against an Indonesian chess player, Dadang Subur (known as Dewa_Kipas online, translated as the "God of Fans"). Suspecting that his opponent was cheating, Rozman reported his account to the Chess.com Fair Play Team. As a result, Subur's account was closed due to cheating. This development, however, led to a backlash from Indonesian netizens, resulting in Rozman facing harassment on social media. To cope with the situation, Rozman opted for privacy by making his social media accounts private and took a brief hiatus from streaming. Subur later played a series of live matches against Indonesian IM Irene Kharisma Sukandar, losing 3–0, with an accuracy of less than 40%. Chess.com estimated his performance in the three games to be at an Elo rating of 1127; his online performance exceeded 3000 by their measurements.

By mid-2021, Rozman's YouTube channel reached one million subscribers, and in September 2021, he became the largest chess creator on YouTube, surpassing Agadmator.

Amidst the increasing popularity of chess on platforms such as TikTok and Instagram, coupled with the Carlsen–Niemann controversy in late 2022, Rozman's YouTube channel continued to grow at a rapid rate, accruing over 300 million views in January 2023, according to Rozman. Shortly after, his YouTube channel became the first chess channel to amass over one billion views. By November 2023, his YouTube channel had garnered 4.3 million subscribers and 1.8 billion views. On November 28, 2023, Rozman was included in the Forbes 30 Under 30 2024 under the "Games" category.

In November 2025, Levy Rozman defeated over 225,000 players in an organised "Levy Rozman vs The World chess match" on Chess.com. In it, he sacrificed a rook, which is associated to him as an internet meme.

== Personal life ==
Rozman has a younger brother named Leo. He met his wife Lucy in November 2015. Rozman is Jewish. His family is originally from Kazan.

Rozman authored the book How to Win at Chess: The Ultimate Guide for Beginners and Beyond, which was released on October 24, 2023. It reached fourth on The New York Times Best Seller list in the category "Advice, How-To & Miscellaneous". Nearly three years later, on October 6, 2026, he released How to Win at Chess, Next Level: The Ultimate Guide for Intermediate Play.

On October 14, 2021, Rozman announced the Levy Rozman Scholarship Fund, through which he is donating $100,000 to elementary-, middle-, and high-school chess programs. ChessKid, a subsidiary of Chess.com, administers the fund, and schools can be awarded between $5,000 and $15,000 to pay for the costs of training, tournament fees, and travel expenses.

== Awards and nominations ==
| Ceremony | Year | Category | Result | Ref. |
|---|---|---|---|---|
| The Streamer Awards | 2021 | Best Chess Streamer | Nominated | |
| The Streamer Awards | 2022 | Best Chess Streamer | Won | |
| The Streamer Awards | 2023 | Best Chess Streamer | Nominated | |

=== Listicles ===
| Publisher | Year | Listicle | Result | Ref. |
|---|---|---|---|---|
| Forbes | 2024 | 30 Under 30: Games | Placed | |
