= Arjun Vishnuvardhan =

Indian chess player

Personal information
- Born: 21 August 1990 (age 36) Kerala, India

Chess career
- Country: India
- Title: International Master (2007)
- Peak rating: 2394 (October 2007)

Chirukandath Manoj Arjun Vishnuvardhan (born 21 August 1990), generally known as Arjun Vishnuvardhan, is an Indian chess player and International Master in the United States of America. At his 15 years of age, in May 2006, he became the National Game-60 Chess Champion of the United States, by beating International Master Edward W. Formanek. This victory over the top International Master made Arjun to become the youngest National Game 60 Champion of the United States.

Arjun was born in Kerala, India and started playing chess when he was 8 years old. In 2001, he won the British Junior Under-11 Championship held at Scarborough, United Kingdom.

== Achievements ==
- British Junior chess champion 2001, Scarborough, United Kingdom
- Triple Crown winner in the Biel International chess festival, Switzerland, 2005
- He won the under-16 title in the 2300 rating section in the International Chess Championship, Spain, 2005
- In June 2018, Arjun tied for second place with IM Leonardo Valdes Romero and his brother, FM Gauri Shankar in the Charlotte Chess Center's Summer 2018 IM Norm Invitational held in Charlotte, North Carolina with a score of 6.0/9.
