= Shiyam Thavandiran =

Canadian chess player (born 1992)

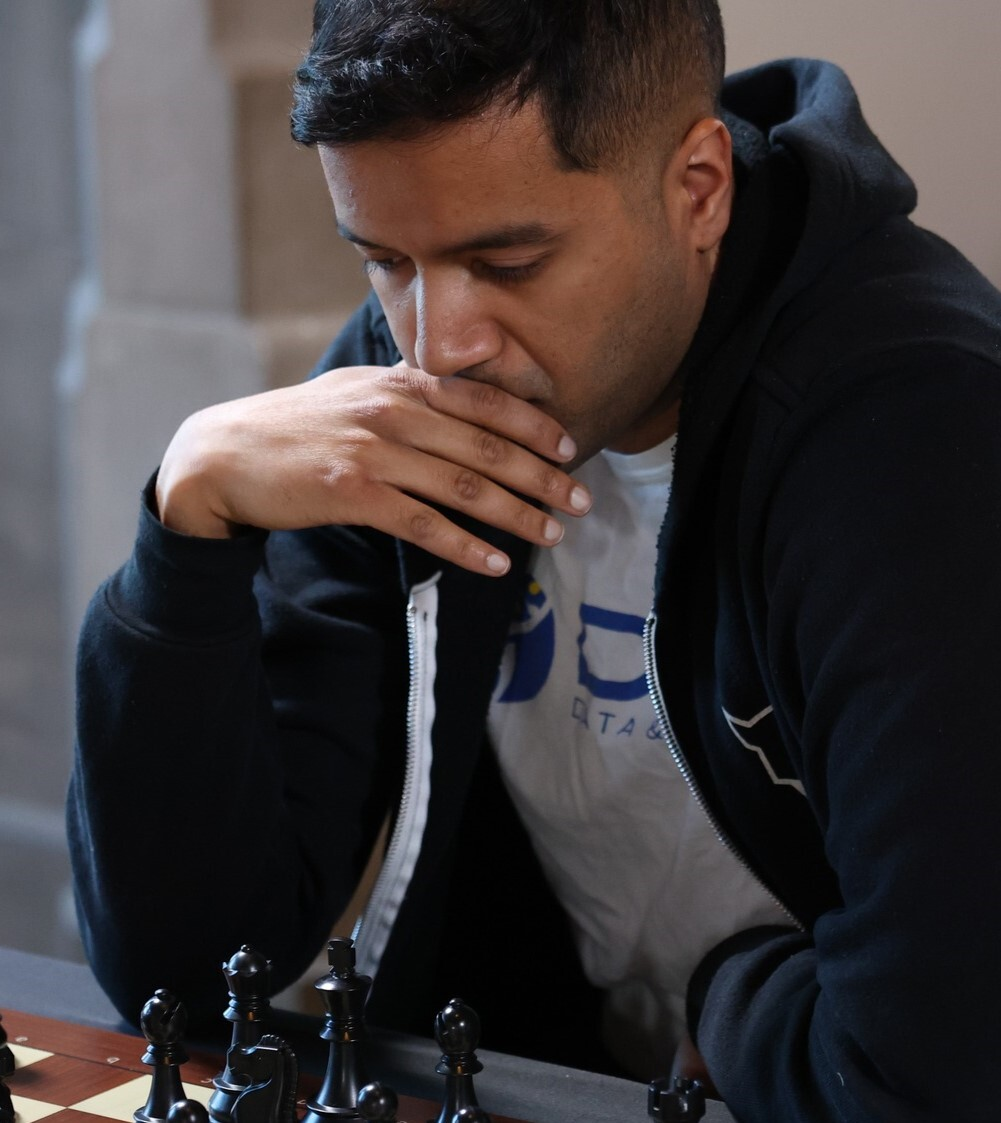
- Thavandiran in 2024

Personal information
- Born: May 25, 1992 (age 34) Toronto, Ontario, Canada

Chess career
- Country: Canada
- Title: International Master (2017)
- FIDE rating: 2405 (November 2026)
- Peak rating: 2420 (December 2019)

Shiyamalen Thavandiran is a Canadian chess player.

== Chess career ==
He started playing chess at the age of 7. He placed 8th in the World U10 Championships and became the youngest Canadian junior champion at the age of 12.

In January 2012, he won

Canadian University Championship, which helped his University of Western Ontario team (Aman Hambleton, Raja Panjwani, and Justin McDonald) to the championship.

He won the Canadian Chess Championship in April 2024, during which he went undefeated and achieved wins against other strong players such as Shawn Rodrigue-Lemieux, Raja Panjwani, Nikolay Noritsyn, and grandmaster Bator Sambuev. In September 2024, he represented the country at the 45th Chess Olympiad, where he defeated the higher-rated grandmasters Štěpán Žilka and Trần Tuấn Minh in the third and last rounds, respectively.

He played in the Chess World Cup 2025, where he was defeated by Daniil Yuffa in the first round.

== Personal life ==
Off the chessboard, he works as a machine learning engineer at Royal Bank of Canada.
