= Raja Panjwani =

Canadian chess player (born 1990)

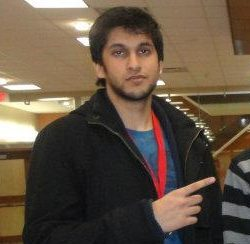
- Panjwani in 2012

Personal information
- Born: April 10, 1990 (age 36) Kitchener, Ontario, Canada

Chess career
- Country: Canada
- Title: International Master (2009)
- Peak rating: 2485 (September 2022)

Raja Panjwani is a Canadian chess player.

== Chess career ==
He began playing chess at the age of 5, and won the Canadian Youth Championship six times.

In August 2009, he won the Canadian Junior Championship, winning ahead of defending champion Artiom Samsonkin.

In January 2012, he played for the University of Western Ontario team in the Canadian University Championship, placing 6th. His team (Aman Hambleton, Shiyam Thavandiran, and Justin McDonald) won the team championship.

He has played for Canada in the Chess Olympiads of 2022 and 2024.

== Personal life ==
He studied at the University of Western Ontario, Yale University, University of Oxford, and New York University.
