= Brian Escalante Ramírez =

Peruvian chess grandmaster (born 1999)

Personal information
- Born: September 20, 1999 (age 26) Tarapoto, Peru

Chess career
- Country: Peru
- Title: Grandmaster (2024)
- FIDE rating: 2454 (August 2026)
- Peak rating: 2500 (December 2023)

Brian Sebastian Escalante Ramírez is a Peruvian chess grandmaster.

== Chess career ==
He began playing chess at the age of 8, and was coached by Jose Luis Chong Sanchez.

In 2017, he won the Pan American Junior Chess Championship.

In November 2023, he achieved the Grandmaster title after defeating Yasser Quesada in the U.S. Masters Open.

== Personal life ==
He is studying for a master's degree in IT and management at the University of Texas at Dallas, and also plays on the university's chess team. In January 2024, he was part of the "A" team, which finished in second place in the Pan-American Intercollegiate Team Chess Championship.
