= Aarav Dengla =

Indian chess grandmaster (born 2009)

Personal information
- Born: July 25, 2009 (age 17) Mumbai, India

Chess career
- Country: India
- Title: Grandmaster (2026)
- FIDE rating: 2506 (September 2026)
- Peak rating: 2506 (February 2026)

Aarav Dengla (born July 25, 2009) is an Indian chess player. He is India's 93rd grandmaster and the third from Mumbai, Maharashtra. His classical live rating stands at 2506. Dengla is the youngest winner of the Grand Paris Masters Championship.

== Career ==
He started playing rated tournaments at the age of 6. His first formal coach was Grandmaster Pravin Thipsay, and he later trained under Indian grandmaster and coach Vishnu Prasanna V.

Dengla received his first GM norm in 2022 at the GM tournament in Bijeljina before winning the Grand Paris Masters Championship in 2024. He won gold at the FIDE Worlds School Rapid and Blitz 2024.

He won his second GM norm during the Zupanja Celebrates the Chess GM-Norm Round Robin in Croatia in 2025.

The third and final GM norm for Dengla came when he won the GM Mix Bijeljina and GM norm Round Robin Tournament consecutively in Bosnia and Herzegovina.

== Writings ==
Aarav Dengla is a regular contributor to leading Indian dailies where he writes on chess history. His writings have been published in The Economic Times, The Indian Express and The Times of India. Some of his articles include:

- Chess, a chequered Islamic past & present (The Economic Times)
- Chess battles: How India-China face-off in 2024 is like the US-USSR Cold War face-off (The Indian Express)
- 'Gens Una Sumus' - What three Latin words beneath a chess emblem taught me about the world (The Times of India)
- Bobby Fischer: The champion America summoned, and Iceland sheltered (The Times of India)
- The Stateless Kings: How Chess preserves an ideal in a fractured world (The Times of India)
- How 3 members of England's 1939 Chess Olympiad team became wartime codebreakers during WWII (The Times of India)
- Before AI, there was the Mechanical Turk: The chess machine that wasn't
- Italian jobs, French connections and Berlin wall: Chess's European tour
- Red Pawns, Red Soldiers: How the Bolskeviks built a chess superpower
