= Julien Song =

French chess player (born 1993)

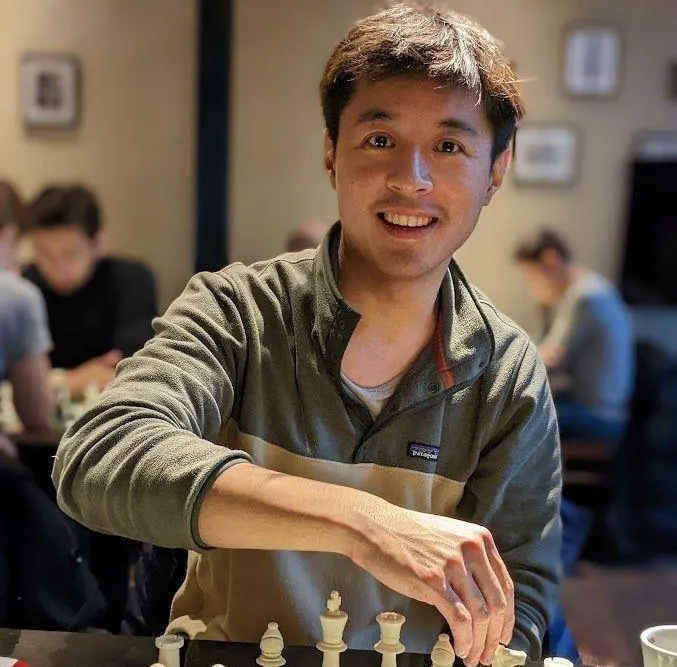

Personal information
- Born: 1 March 1993 (age 33) Paris, France

Chess career
- Country: France
- Title: International Master (2013)
- Peak rating: 2422 (January 2013)

Julien Song (born 1 March 1993 in the 11th arrondissement of Paris) is a French chess player holding the title of International Master. He is also a chess content creator, online club organizer, and former strategy consultant.

== Biography ==
Originally from the Lyon area, Julien Song started playing chess at the age of ten. After studying in preparatory classes, he attended EM Lyon Business School and then worked as a strategy consultant at Boston Consulting Group (BCG). In April 2020, faced with health issues related to stress, he left his job to fully dedicate himself to chess, with the goal of becoming a Grandmaster.

=== Chess career ===
Julien Song currently has an Elo rating of 2320 in Classical Chess, as of February 2026, placing him in the 137th position in the French rankings, amongst active players. He is also rated 2278 in Rapid Chess, and 2227 in Blitz Chess. He notably won the 19th Sèvres Open in February 2025, outperforming several International Masters.

=== Online activities ===
Julien Song runs a YouTube channel dedicated to chess, gathering nearly 891,000 subscribers as of April 2026. He also offers a weekly newsletter titled "Les Conseils du Samedi" and manages an online chess club with more than 5,800 members.

=== Educational engagement ===
In December 2024, Julien Song taught chess at the Lycée français international de Tokyo, introducing students to the game while sharing his journey and the values of chess. A video of this encounter was published on his YouTube channel in February 2025.
