= Gauri Shankar (chess player) =

Indian chess player (born 1992)

Personal information
- Born: October 1, 1992 (age 33)

Chess career
- Country: India
- Title: International Master (2025)
- Peak rating: 2407 (October 2025)

Gauri Shankar (born 1 October 1992) is an Indian chess player who is currently a International Master.

Gauri's older brother Arjun Vishnuvardhan is an International Chess Master and the 2006 National G/60 Chess Champion of the United States.

== Achievements ==
- National Chess Champion of India for Under-7 boys 1999–2000, Aurangabad, India.
- 2006 US Junior Open Chess Champion, Texas, United States.
- 2007 Biel International Youth Chess Champion, Switzerland in August.
