= Kayden Troff =

American chess grandmaster (born 1998)

Personal information
- Born: Kayden William Troff; May 6, 1998 (age 28) Murray, Utah, U.S.

Chess career
- Country: United States
- Title: Grandmaster (2014)
- FIDE rating: 2482 (July 2026)
- Peak rating: 2556 (May 2015)

Kayden William Troff (born May 6, 1998) is an American chess grandmaster. He was World U14 Chess Champion in 2012.

== Personal life ==
Troff grew up in West Jordan, Utah, with his parents Kim and Daniel, sister Brynndi, and brothers Jeremy and Zachary Troff. He is a member of the Church of Jesus Christ of Latter-Day Saints and served a mission in Australia.

== Early years ==
He first demonstrated chess ability at the age of three, having learned to play by watching his father. When Troff turned six, he spent a week training with Grandmaster Igor Ivanov. He has also been trained by Melikset Khachiyan and Alexander Chernin.

Troff first won a Utah State Elementary Championship at the age of six and won first place in his section in the Utah State Elementary Championship each year after.

In December 2007, he was named to the United States Chess Federation's 2008 All-America Chess Team; and at age 10, he was named in the 2010 All-America Chess Team, an honor described as "one of the highest national honors attainable by a young chess player". On December 14, 2008, he won second place at the fifth-grade level at the National K–12 Championships.

In 2009, Troff won the Utah Speed Chess Championship at age ten, becoming the youngest player to win that event. This was followed up by becoming Utah G/60 Champion, the youngest player to do so. After this win, the tournament director dubbed him "Utah's Mozart of Chess." He also won the 2009 North American Youth Championship for under-12s in Mazatlán.

Troff's quick rating was the highest of all US players under the age of 13, according to the Top 100 rating list published by the USCF from June 2009 through October 2010. In May 2010, he defeated Harold Stevens, Utah's then-highest-rated player, in a match, winning all three games. In October 2010, he won the Utah Open tournament.

== Notable accomplishments ==
Troff won the world championship for ages 14 and under in Maribor, Slovenia, in 2012. He also won the silver medal for ages 12 and under at the World Youth Chess Championships in Greece in 2010, behind future grandmaster Wei Yi.

Having already obtained the three GM Norms needed, he reached 2500 Elo rating to earn the Grandmaster title at the Saint Louis Invitational in May 2014, at age 16.

In June 2014, Troff became US Junior Chess Champion, scoring 7/9 points.

== Twitch streaming ==
In June 2023, Troff began streaming chess gameplay on Twitch under the name ChessSharkz.
