= John Bartholomew (chess player) =

American chess player (born 1986)

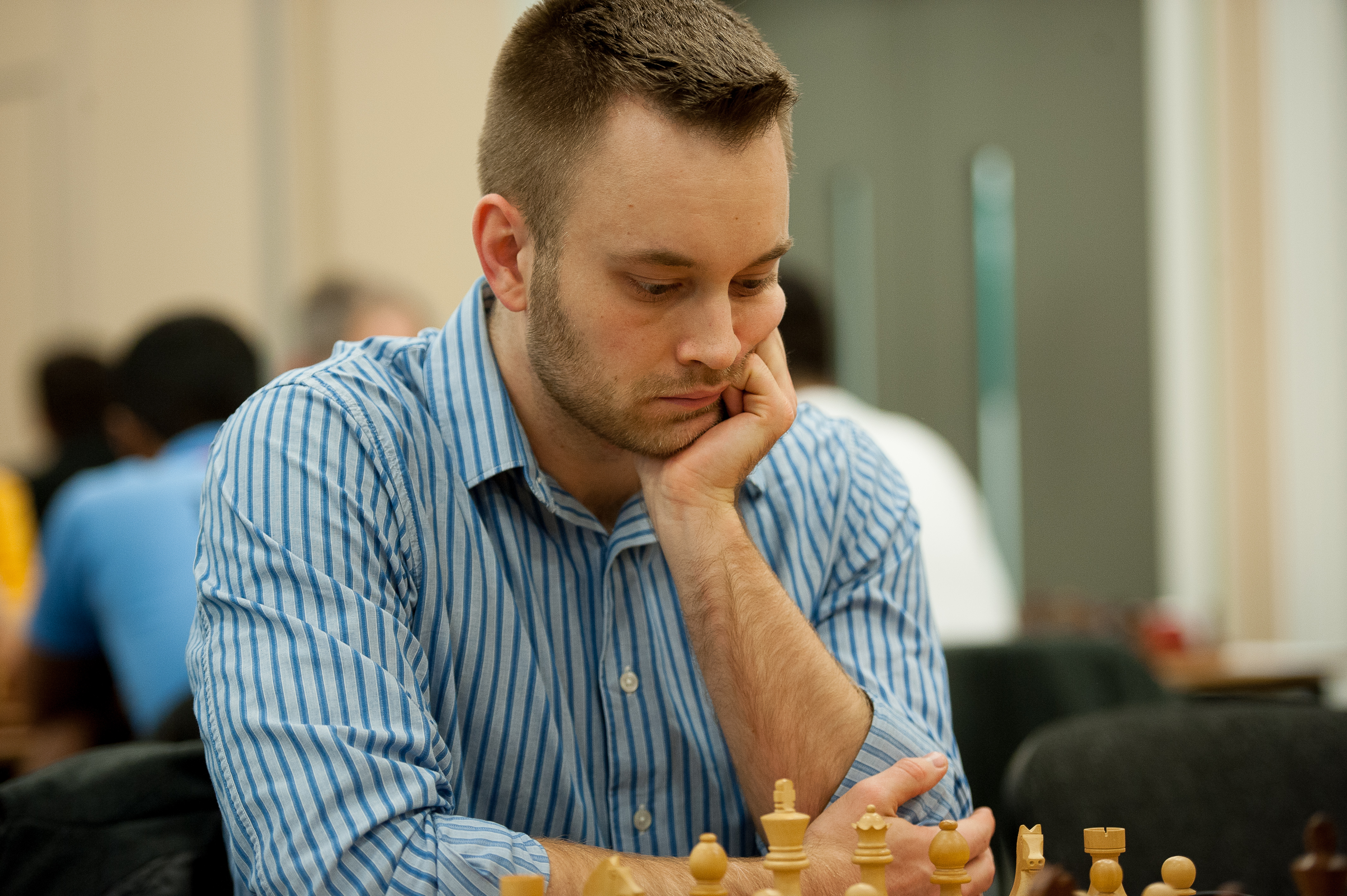
- Bartholomew at the London Chess Classic, 2016

Personal information
- Born: September 5, 1986 (age 39) Eagan, Minnesota

Chess career
- Country: United States
- Title: International Master (2006)
- FIDE rating: 2446 (August 2026)
- Peak rating: 2477 (March 2018)

John David Bartholomew (born September 5, 1986) is an American chess player, International Master, YouTuber, and entrepreneur. He is from Eagan, Minnesota.

== Chess career ==
In 2002, Bartholomew won the National High School Chess Championship, and in 2006 became an International Master (IM). He studied at the University of Texas, Dallas on a chess-based full ride scholarship, which he earned at the age of 14. After leaving law school, he became the coach of David Floeder, a middle school student who won the National K-12 U.S. Chess Federation Championship in 2012. Bartholomew earned his first Grandmaster norm at the Saint Louis Classic in 2013. He is a four-time winner of the Okoboji Open.

He has a dedicated YouTube channel of instructional chess videos and is one of the most popular chess YouTubers. He is the co-founder of Chessable together with David Kramaley ─ a chess education website dedicated to teaching chess in a systematic manner. The project was launched in November 2015 and the website was officially launched on February 22, 2016. In September 2019, the company joined forces with an existing merger of Play Magnus AS and Chess24.com.

In January 2018, Bartholomew earned clear first place in the Charlotte Chess Center's Winter 2018 GM Norm Invitational held in Charlotte, North Carolina with an undefeated score of 6.0/9.

In 2019, Bartholomew was inducted into the Minnesota Chess Hall of Fame.

In July 2026, He won the Creator Invitational section of Naroditsky Memorial 2026 with the score 9/9.
