= Aman Hambleton =

Canadian chess grandmaster (born 1992)

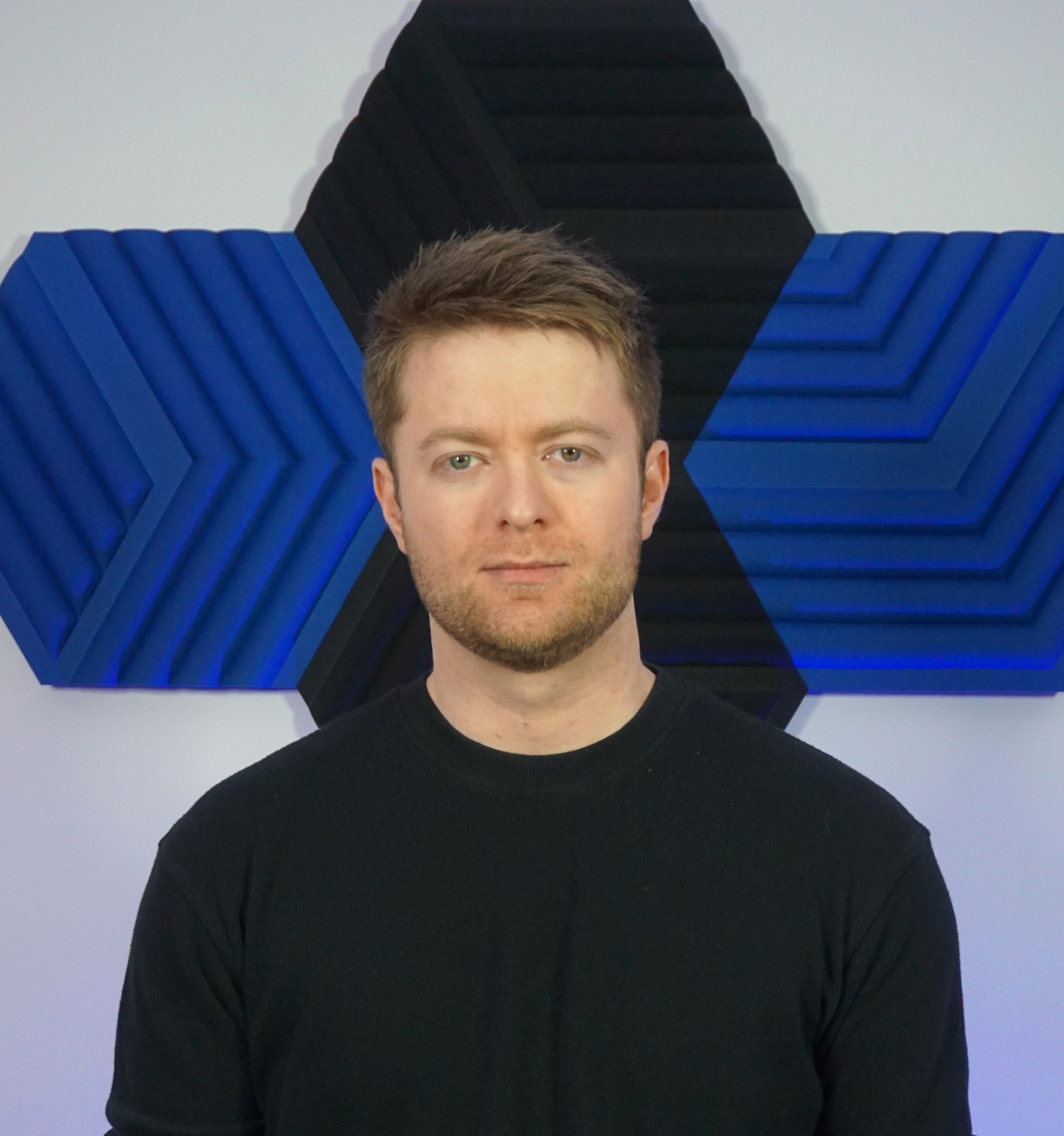
- Hambleton in 2023

Personal information
- Born: 30 December 1992 (age 33) Halifax, Nova Scotia, Canada

Chess career
- Country: Canada
- Title: Grandmaster (2018)
- FIDE rating: 2420 (October 2026)
- Peak rating: 2509 (September 2013)

Aman Hambleton (born 30 December 1992) is a Canadian chess grandmaster, Twitch/Kick streamer, and Youtube content creator. He is a member of the 'Chessbrahs' (a Canadian chess entertainment company), along with other grandmasters such as Eric Hansen (founder), Robin van Kampen, and Yasser Seirawan.

== Chess career ==
Hambleton was born in 1992 in Halifax, Nova Scotia, and learned to play chess at age five. He moved to Toronto at age six, and played in his first tournament in the same year.

He earned his international master (IM) title in 2013, and was awarded his grandmaster (GM) title by FIDE in April 2018, becoming Canada's tenth GM. He earned his first GM norm at the UNAM Chess Festival in 2012, while still a FIDE master, but did not achieve the second norm until the Reykjavik Open in April 2017. He had vowed in March 2017 not to shave his beard until he attained the GM title, resulting in a lengthy beard by the time he earned his third GM norm in December 2017. He also won the Canadian Open Chess Championship in July 2017, sharing first with Razvan Preotu on a score of 6½/9.

Hambleton represented Canada at the 41st Chess Olympiad. On the reserve board, he scored 3½/7 (+2–2=3). He played on the reserve board again at the 43rd Chess Olympiad. He lost to the 1937-rated Rijendra Rajbhandari in the first round, but won his last four games to finish on 4½/7 (+4–2=1). As of January 2022, Hambleton is the No. 8 ranked Canadian player, with a rating of 2454.

== Education ==
Hambleton attended high school in Scarborough, Ontario at Woburn Collegiate Institute where he played on the soccer and chess teams, along with being a member of the spoken word club. He graduated in Spring of 2010 with a CFC rating of 2315 after competing in the 2010 Hart House Toronto Open.

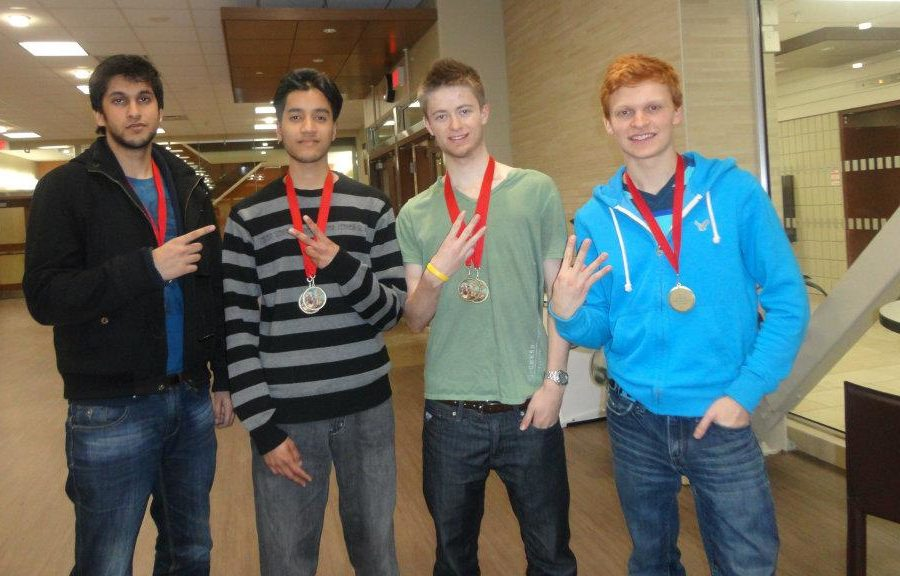
Members of Western's 2012 University Chess Championship team. From left to right: Raja Panjwani, Shiyam Thavandiran, Aman Hambleton, Justin McDonald

Hambleton was accepted into both Queen's University's Commerce program and the University of Western Ontario's Ivey School of Business. Electing to go to Western, he became president of the UWO Chess Club during his second year. During this year, Hambleton organized and competed in the 2012 Canadian University Chess Championship which took place at Western University. He placed second in the tournament, helping Western to the championship along with teammates Shiyam Thavandiran (1st-place), Raja Panjwani (6th-place), and Justin McDonald (13th-place).

== Chess boxing ==
Hambleton had a chess boxing contest with IM Lawrence Trent on 11 December 2022. Chess.com described it as "the highest-rated chessboxing match in history". Hambleton won via technical knockout in the first round of the boxing portion of the match.
