= Ron Henley (chess player) =

American chess grandmaster (born 1956)

Personal information
- Born: Ronald Watson Henley; December 5, 1956 (age 69) Houston, Texas, U.S.

Chess career
- Country: United States
- Title: Grandmaster (1982)
- FIDE rating: 2414 (September 2026)
- Peak rating: 2505 (January 1985)
- Peak ranking: No. 48 (July 1983)

Ronald Watson Henley (born December 5, 1956, in Houston, Texas) is an American chess grandmaster, writer, narrator and producer of chess videos, as well as financial funding trader. For highschool, he went to Lamar High in Arlington Texas. He now works at Miami Country Day School and manages a chess club there.

== Chess career ==
Henley was awarded the International Master title in 1980, and the Grandmaster title in 1982. Henley appeared on the cover of Chess Life in 1982, representing the United States. He earned the GM title while finishing equal first with Walter Browne in a 26-player round-robin tournament in Surakarta/Denpasar, Indonesia, defeating Grandmaster Tony Miles in the last round.

Henley was appointed by Garry Kasparov and Anatoly Karpov as President of the World Chess Champions Council Inc, a New York nonprofit organization that promotes chess in schools.

=== Champion chess trainer ===
Henley has been a second, analyst and trainer for former World Chess Champion Anatoly Karpov in several matches in the 1990s.

Henley has served as a chess trainer and promoter of leading young women chess players, including Three Time US Women's Chess Champion Irina Krush.

Ronald Henley, now inactive in competitive chess, tutors individuals.

== Chess publishing ==
=== Online chess videos ===
In 2012, Henley was invited to join National Master William Stewart for the educational website called 'OnlineChessLessons'. Henley provides skills as a chess analyst to an international audience. During COVID-19, Henley produced many videos and streams under the name 'HenChess'. He collaborated with many chess players such as Karpov to produce chess content.

=== Chess DVDs ===
Henley narrated the double-volume chess video, "American Chess Princesses". In this video, Irina Krush, Elina Groberman, Laura Ross and Shirley Ben-Dak present some of their best games from the 1997 FIDE World Youth Chess Championships held in Cannes, France. In the late 1990s, Henley founded the site www.ChessSuperstore.com, which sponsored Irina Krush and Hikaru Nakamura.

=== Chess books ===
- Elista Diaries: Karpov-Kamsky, Karpov-Anand, Anand Mexico City 2007 World Chess Championship Matches (with Anatoly Karpov) ISBN 0-923891-97-8
- Archangel!: A Defense Against the Ruy Lopez ISBN 1-883358-01-9
- The King's Indian Attack! ISBN 1-883358-02-7
- The Spanish Exchange! ISBN 1-883358-08-6
- The Dragon!: Powerplay ISBN 1-883358-06-X
- The ChessBase University BlueBook Guide to Winning with The King's Indian Attack! ISBN 1-883358-00-0
- Crushing White: The Dzindzi Indian! Volume 1: ISBN 978-1-935979-01-2

== Financial career ==
As President of RWH Advisors, Henley acts as Special Consultant to Ultra High Net Worth Individuals and Family Offices.

From 1985 through 2001, Henley was an American Stock Exchange Member, as a trader, market maker and specialist. Henley traded extensively in Phillip Morris, Wells Fargo and Teva Pharmaceuticals.

From 2001 to 2005, Henley was a founding partner and Head Trader of a statistical arbitrage family of hedge funds, with clients such as Bank of America, Gottex Fund of Funds and Aegon USA Insurance Company.

Henley is an International Registered Financial Consultant, and went into business consulting where he joined the Board of Directors of several private companies including Quantum Genomics. Henley is currently a member of the financial trading industry.

Henley has made presentations at several conferences in the financial industry, including

- LightHouse Hedge Fund Conference 2003
- GAIM 2010
- Raleigh NC 2010
