= Stepan Avagyan Memorial 2026 =

Armenian chess tournament

Tournament information
- Location: Jermuk, Armenia
- Dates: 28 May–6 June
- Format: 9-round round-robin tournament
- Purse: AMD 10,500,000

Final positions
- Champion: Samuel Sevian

The Stepan Avagyan Memorial 2026 was the 7th edition of the Stepan Avagyan Memorial held in Jermuk, Armenia. It was a 10 player round-robin tournament from 28 May to 6 June 2026. The time control was 90 minutes for the first 40 moves, followed by 30 minutes for the rest of the game, with a 30-sec increment from move one.

Aravindh Chithambaram was the defending champion. Both Samuel Sevian and Vladislav Artemiev scored 5.5 points in 9 rounds. Sevian won the tournament by tie-break scores.

== Prize money ==
| Total Fund | Winner | Second place | Third place | Fourth place |
| 10,500,000 AMD | 3,200,000 AMD | 2,200,000 AMD | 1,700,000 AMD | 950,000 AMD |

== Standings ==
7th Stepan Avagyan Memorial, 28 May – 6 June 2026, Jermuk, Armenia, Category XVII (2657.1)
| | Player | Rating | 1 | 2 | 3 | 4 | 5 | 6 | 7 | 8 | 9 | 10 | Pts. | SB |
|---|---|---|---|---|---|---|---|---|---|---|---|---|---|---|
| 1 | Samuel Sevian (United States) | 2696 | | ½ | ½ | 1 | ½ | ½ | ½ | ½ | 1 | ½ | 5½ | 24.00 |
| 2 | Vladislav Artemiev (FIDE) | 2641 | ½ | | ½ | ½ | ½ | ½ | ½ | ½ | 1 | 1 | 5½ | 23.25 |
| 3 | Nihal Sarin (India) | 2723 | ½ | ½ | | ½ | ½ | ½ | ½ | 1 | ½ | ½ | 5 | 22.00 |
| 4 | Ray Robson (United States) | 2653 | 0 | ½ | ½ | | ½ | 1 | ½ | 0 | 1 | 1 | 5 | 21.00 |
| 5 | Shant Sargsyan (Armenia) | 2644 | ½ | ½ | ½ | ½ | | ½ | ½ | ½ | 0 | 1 | 4½ | 20.00 |
| 6 | Aram Hakobyan (Armenia) | 2635 | ½ | ½ | ½ | 0 | ½ | | ½ | ½ | ½ | 1 | 4½ | 19.50 |
| 7 | Robert Hovhannisyan (Armenia) | 2629 | ½ | ½ | ½ | ½ | ½ | ½ | | ½ | ½ | 0 | 4 | 18.75 |
| 8 | Alexander Donchenko (Germany) | 2645 | ½ | ½ | 0 | 1 | ½ | ½ | ½ | | 0 | ½ | 4 | 18.75 |
| 9 | Aravindh Chithambaram (India) | 2692 | 0 | 0 | ½ | 0 | 1 | ½ | ½ | 1 | | 0 | 3½ | 15.25 |
| 10 | Szymon Gumularz (Poland) | 2613 | ½ | 0 | ½ | 0 | 0 | 0 | 1 | ½ | 1 | | 3½ | 14.75 |

== Results by round ==
Round 1 – 29 May 2026
| Ray Robson | ½–½ | Robert Hovhannisyan |
| Alexander Donchenko | ½–½ | Szymon Gumularz |
| Aravindh Chithambaram | 1–0 | Shant Sargsyan |
| Nihal Sarin | ½–½ | Sam Sevian |
| Aram Hakobyan | ½–½ | Vladislav Artemiev |
Round 2 – 30 May 2026
| Robert Hovhannisyan | ½–½ | Vladislav Artemiev |
| Sam Sevian | ½–½ | Aram Hakobyan |
| Shant Sargsyan | ½–½ | Nihal Sarin |
| Szymon Gumularz | 1–0 | Aravindh Chithambaram |
| Ray Robson | 0–1 | Alexander Donchenko |
Round 3 – 31 May 2026
| Alexander Donchenko | ½–½ | Robert Hovhannisyan |
| Aravindh Chithambaram | 0–1 | Ray Robson |
| Nihal Sarin | ½–½ | Szymon Gumularz |
| Aram Hakobyan | ½–½ | Shant Sargsyan |
| Vladislav Artemiev | ½–½ | Sam Sevian |
Round 4 – 1 Jun 2026
| Robert Hovhannisyan | ½–½ | Sam Sevian |
| Shant Sargsyan | ½–½ | Vladislav Artemiev |
| Szymon Gumularz | 0–1 | Aram Hakobyan |
| Ray Robson | ½–½ | Nihal Sarin |
| Alexander Donchenko | 0–1 | Aravindh Chithambaram |
Round 5 – 2 Jun 2026
| Aravindh Chithambaram | ½–½ | Robert Hovhannisyan |
| Nihal Sarin | 1–0 | Alexander Donchenko |
| Aram Hakobyan | 0–1 | Ray Robson |
| Vladislav Artemiev | 1–0 | Szymon Gumularz |
| Sam Sevian | ½–½ | Shant Sargsyan |

Round 6 – 3 Jun 2026
| Robert Hovhannisyan | ½–½ | Shant Sargsyan |
| Szymon Gumularz | ½–½ | Sam Sevian |
| Ray Robson | ½–½ | Vladislav Artemiev |
| Alexander Donchenko | ½–½ | Aram Hakobyan |
| Aravindh Chithambaram | ½–½ | Nihal Sarin |
Round 7 – 4 Jun 2026
| Nihal Sarin | ½–½ | Robert Hovhannisyan |
| Aram Hakobyan | ½–½ | Aravindh Chithambaram |
| Vladislav Artemiev | ½–½ | Alexander Donchenko |
| Sam Sevian | 1–0 | Ray Robson |
| Shant Sargsyan | 1–0 | Szymon Gumularz |
Round 8 – 5 Jun 2026
| Robert Hovhannisyan | 0–1 | Szymon Gumularz |
| Ray Robson | ½–½ | Shant Sargsyan |
| Alexander Donchenko | ½–½ | Sam Sevian |
| Aravindh Chithambaram | 0–1 | Vladislav Artemiev |
| Nihal Sarin | ½–½ | Aram Hakobyan |
Round 9 – 6 Jun 2026
| Aram Hakobyan | ½–½ | Robert Hovhannisyan |
| Vladislav Artemiev | ½–½ | Nihal Sarin |
| Sam Sevian | 1–0 | Aravindh Chithambaram |
| Shant Sargsyan | ½–½ | Alexander Donchenko |
| Szymon Gumularz | 0–1 | Ray Robson |

== See also ==
- Stepan Avagyan Memorial
- Stepan Avagyan Memorial 2024
- Stepan Avagyan Memorial 2025
