= Stepan Avagyan Memorial =

Chess tournament in Armenia

Tournament information
- Location: Jermuk, Armenia
- Format: 9-round round-robin tournament

Current champion
- Samuel Sevian

The Stepan Avagyan Memorial is an annual, closed chess tournament hosted at the Jermuk Ashkarh Health Center in Jermuk, Armenia, in memory of Stepan Avagyan. It is a 10 player round-robin tournament. The time control is 90 minutes for the first 40 moves, followed by 30 minutes for the rest of the game, with a 30 second increment starting from move one.

Samuel Sevian is the current champion.

== Winners ==
#	Year	Winner(s)
1	2020	Manuel Petrosyan (Armenia)
2	2021	Manuel Petrosyan (Armenia)
3	2022	Amin Tabatabaei (Iran)
4	2023	Samuel Sevian (United States)
5	2024	Arjun Erigaisi (India)
6	2025	Aravindh Chithambaram (India)
7	2026	Samuel Sevian (United States)

== See also ==
- Stepan Avagyan Memorial 2024
- Stepan Avagyan Memorial 2025
- Stepan Avagyan Memorial 2026
