= Stepan Avagyan Memorial 2024 =

Armenian chess tournament

Tournament information
- Location: Jermuk, Armenia
- Format: 9-round round-robin tournament

Final positions
- Champion: Arjun Erigaisi

The Stepan Avagyan Memorial 2024 was the 5th edition of the Stepan Avagyan Memorial held in Jermuk, Armenia. It was a 10 player round-robin tournament held from 10 June to 18 June 2024.

Sam Sevian was the defending champion, but he finished 2nd in this edition. Arjun Erigaisi won the tournament with 6.5 points.

== Results by round ==
Round 1 – 10 Jun 2024
Amin Tabatabaei	½–½	Haik Martirosyan
Sam Sevian	½–½	Shant Sargsyan
Arjun Erigaisi	1–0	Robert Hovhannisyan
Matthias Bluebaum	½–½	Manuel Petrosyan
Bogdan-Daniel Deac	1–0	Volodar Murzin
Round 2 – 11 Jun 2024
Haik Martirosyan	1-0	Volodar Murzin
Manuel Petrosyan	½–½	Bogdan-Daniel Deac
Robert Hovhannisyan	½–½	Matthias Bluebaum
Shant Sargsyan	0-1	Arjun Erigaisi
Amin Tabatabaei	½–½	Sam Sevian
Round 3 – 12 Jun 2024
Sam Sevian	1–0	Haik Martirosyan
Arjun Erigaisi	½–½	Amin Tabatabaei
Matthias Bluebaum	½–½	Shant Sargsyan
Bogdan-Daniel Deac	½–½	Robert Hovhannisyan
Volodar Murzin	½–½	Manuel Petrosyan
Round 4 – 13 Jun 2024
Haik Martirosyan	1–0	Manuel Petrosyan
Robert Hovhannisyan	½–½	Volodar Murzin
Shant Sargsyan	½–½	Bogdan-Daniel Deac
Amin Tabatabaei	1-0	Matthias Bluebaum
Sam Sevian	½–½	Arjun Erigaisi
Round 5 – 14 Jun 2024
Arjun Erigaisi	½–½	Haik Martirosyan
Matthias Bluebaum	½–½	Sam Sevian
Bogdan-Daniel Deac	½–½	Amin Tabatabaei
Volodar Murzin	½–½	Shant Sargsyan
Manuel Petrosyan	½–½	Robert Hovhannisyan

Round 6 – 15 Jun 2024
Haik Martirosyan	0-1	Robert Hovhannisyan
Shant Sargsyan	½–½	Manuel Petrosyan
Amin Tabatabaei	½–½	Volodar Murzin
Sam Sevian	½–½	Bogdan-Daniel Deac
Arjun Erigaisi	1-0	Matthias Bluebaum
Round 7 – 16 Jun 2024
Matthias Bluebaum	½–½	Haik Martirosyan
Bogdan-Daniel Deac	½–½	Arjun Erigaisi
Volodar Murzin	½–½	Sam Sevian
Manuel Petrosyan	½–½	Amin Tabatabaei
Robert Hovhannisyan	½–½	Shant Sargsyan
Round 8 – 17 Jun 2024
Haik Martirosyan	½–½	Shant Sargsyan
Amin Tabatabaei	½–½	Robert Hovhannisyan
Sam Sevian	½–½	Manuel Petrosyan
Arjun Erigaisi	1-0	Volodar Murzin
Matthias Bluebaum	½–½	Bogdan-Daniel Deac
Round 9 – 18 Jun 2024
Bogdan-Daniel Deac	½–½	Haik Martirosyan
Volodar Murzin	½–½	Matthias Bluebaum
Manuel Petrosyan	½–½	Arjun Erigaisi
Robert Hovhannisyan	½–½	Sam Sevian
Shant Sargsyan	½–½	Amin Tabatabaei

== Standings ==
	Player	Rating	1	2	3	4	5	6	7	8	9	10	Pts.
1	Arjun Erigaisi (India)	2761		½	½	½	1	½	½	1	1	1	6.5
2	Sam Sevian (USA)	2687	½		½	½	½	1	½	½	½	½	5
3	Amin Tabatabaei (Iran)	2713	½	½		½	½	½	½	½	1	½	5
4	Bogdan-Daniel Deac (Romania)	2680	½	½	½		½	½	½	½	½	1	5
5	Robert Hovhannisyan (Armenia)	2611	0	½	½	½		1	½	½	½	½	4.5
6	Haik Martirosyan (Armenia)	2662	½	0	½	½	0		1	½	½	1	4.5
7	Manuel Petrosyan (Armenia)	2625	½	½	½	½	½	0		½	½	½	4
8	Shant Sargsyan (Armenia)	2639	0	½	½	½	½	½	½		½	½	4
9	Matthias Bluebaum (Germany)	2647	0	½	0	½	½	½	½	½		½	3.5
10	Volodar Murzin (FIDE)	2650	0	½	½	0	½	0	½	½	½		3
