= Stepan Avagyan Memorial 2025 =

Armenian chess tournament

Tournament information
- Location: Jermuk, Armenia
- Dates: 29 May–6 June
- Format: 9-round round-robin tournament
- Purse: AMD 7,450,000

Final positions
- Champion: Aravindh Chithambaram

The Stepan Avagyan Memorial 2025 was the 6th edition of the Stepan Avagyan Memorial happening in Jermuk, Armenia. It was a 10 player round-robin tournament from 29 May to 6 June 2025. The time control is 90 minutes for the first 40 moves, followed by 30 minutes for the rest of the game, with a 30-sec increment from move one.

Arjun Erigaisi was the defending champion, but he did not participate this year. Both Aravindh Chithambaram and Praggnanandhaa R scored 6.5 points in 9 rounds. Aravindh won the tournament by tie-break scores.

== Prize money ==
Total Fund	Winner	Second place	Third place	Fourth place
7,450,000 AMD	3,100,000 AMD	1,850,000 AMD	1,500,000 AMD	1,000,000 AMD

== Results by round ==
Round 1 – 29 May 2025
Robert Hovhannisyan	0–1	Xu Xiangyu
Aravindh Chithambaram	½–½	Praggnanandhaa R
Jonas Buhl Bjerre	½–½	Aram Hakobyan
Sam Sevian	½–½	Benjamin Gledura
Nodirbek Yakubboev	½–½	Dmitrij Kollars
Round 2 – 30 May 2025
Xu Xiangyu	½–½	Dmitrij Kollars
Benjamin Gledura	½–½	Nodirbek Yakubboev
Aram Hakobyan	½–½	Sam Sevian
Praggnanandhaa R	½–½	Jonas Buhl Bjerre
Robert Hovhannisyan	½–½	Aravindh Chithambaram
Round 3 – 31 May 2025
Aravindh Chithambaram	1–0	Xu Xiangyu
Jonas Buhl Bjerre	½–½	Robert Hovhannisyan
Sam Sevian	½–½	Praggnanandhaa R
Nodirbek Yakubboev	0–1	Aram Hakobyan
Dmitrij Kollars	1–0	Benjamin Gledura
Round 4 – 1 Jun 2025
Xu Xiangyu	½–½	Benjamin Gledura
Aram Hakobyan	½–½	Dmitrij Kollars
Praggnanandhaa R	1–0	Nodirbek Yakubboev
Robert Hovhannisyan	½–½	Sam Sevian
Aravindh Chithambaram	1–0	Jonas Buhl Bjerre
Round 5 – 2 Jun 2025
Jonas Buhl Bjerre	1–0	Xu Xiangyu
Sam Sevian	½–½	Aravindh Chithambaram
Nodirbek Yakubboev	1–0	Robert Hovhannisyan
Dmitrij Kollars	½–½	Praggnanandhaa R
Benjamin Gledura	½–½	Aram Hakobyan

Round 6 – 3 Jun 2025
Xu Xiangyu	½–½	Aram Hakobyan
Praggnanandhaa R	1-0	Benjamin Gledura
Robert Hovhannisyan	½–½	Dmitrij Kollars
Aravindh Chithambaram	½–½	Nodirbek Yakubboev
Jonas Buhl Bjerre	½–½	Sam Sevian
Round 7 – 4 Jun 2025
Sam Sevian	½–½	Xu Xiangyu
Nodirbek Yakubboev	½–½	Jonas Buhl Bjerre
Dmitrij Kollars	½–½	Aravindh Chithambaram
Benjamin Gledura	0-1	Robert Hovhannisyan
Aram Hakobyan	0-1	Praggnanandhaa R
Round 8 – 5 Jun 2025
Xu Xiangyu	½–½	Praggnanandhaa R
Robert Hovhannisyan	½–½	Aram Hakobyan
Aravindh Chithambaram	1-0	Benjamin Gledura
Jonas Buhl Bjerre	½–½	Dmitrij Kollars
Sam Sevian	½–½	Nodirbek Yakubboev
Round 9 – 6 Jun 2025
Nodirbek Yakubboev	½-½	Xu Xiangyu
Dmitrij Kollars	½-½	Sam Sevian
Benjamin Gledura	½-½	Jonas Buhl Bjerre
Aram Hakobyan	0-1	Aravindh Chithambaram
Praggnanandhaa R	1-0	Robert Hovhannisyan

== Standings ==
	Player	Rating	1	2	3	4	5	6	7	8	9	10	Pts.
1	Aravindh Chithambaram (India)	2749		½	½	½	1	½	1	1	½	1	6.5
2	R Praggnanandhaa (India)	2758	½		½	½	½	1	½	1	1	1	6.5
3	Dmitrij Kollars (Germany)	2625	½	½		½	½	½	½	½	½	1	5
4	Samuel Sevian (United States)	2694	½	½	½		½	½	½	½	½	½	4.5
5	Jonas Buhl Bjerre (Denmark)	2641	0	½	½	½		½	1	½	½	½	4.5
6	Nodirbek Yakubboev (Uzbekistan)	2665	½	0	½	½	½		½	0	1	½	4
7	Xu Xiangyu (China)	2623	0	½	½	½	0	½		½	1	½	4
8	Aram Hakobyan (Armenia)	2620	0	0	½	½	½	1	½		½	½	4
9	Robert Hovhannisyan (Armenia)	2635	½	0	½	½	½	0	0	½		1	3.5
10	Benjamin Gledura (Hungary)	2663	0	0	0	½	½	½	½	½	0		2.5
