= Stepan Avagyan Memorial 2023 =

Invitational chess tournament

Tournament information
- Location: Jermuk, Armenia
- Format: 9-round round-robin tournament

Final positions
- Champion: Sam Sevian

The Stepan Avagyan Memorial 2023 was the 4th edition of the Stepan Avagyan Memorial held in Jermuk, Armenia. It was a 10 player round-robin tournament held from 3 May to 11 May 2023.

Sam Sevian won the tournament ahead of the field by a full point with a score of 6/9.

== Results by round ==
Round 1 – 3 May 2023
Samuel Sevian	1–0	Thai Dai Van Nguyen
Amin Tabatabaei	0–1	Andrey Esipenko
Haik Martirosyan	½–½	Robert Hovhannisyan
Frederik Svane	½–½	Nodirbek Yakubboev
S. L. Narayanan	1–0	Artur Davtyan
Round 2 – 4 May 2023
Robert Hovhannisyan	1–0	Frederik Svane
Andrey Esipenko	0–1	Samuel Sevian
S. L. Narayanan	½–½	Amin Tabatabaei
Thai Dai Van Nguyen	½–½	Haik Martirosyan
Artur Davtyan	½–½	Nodirbek Yakubboev
Round 3 – 5 May 2023
Samuel Sevian	½–½	S. L. Narayanan
Nodirbek Yakubboev	1–0	Robert Hovhannisyan
Amin Tabatabaei	1–0	Artur Davtyan
Haik Martirosyan	½–½	Andrey Esipenko
Frederik Svane	½–½	Thai Dai Van Nguyen
Round 4 – 6 May 2023
Amin Tabatabaei	½–½	Samuel Sevian
Andrey Esipenko	½–½	Frederik Svane
S. L. Narayanan	½–½	Haik Martirosyan
Thai Dai Van Nguyen	½–½	Nodirbek Yakubboev
Artur Davtyan	0–1	Robert Hovhannisyan
Round 5 – 7 May 2023
Samuel Sevian	1–0	Artur Davtyan
Nodirbek Yakubboev	½–½	Andrey Esipenko
Haik Martirosyan	½–½	Amin Tabatabaei
Robert Hovhannisyan	½–½	Thai Dai Van Nguyen
Frederik Svane	1–0	S. L. Narayanan

Round 6 – 8 May 2023
Samuel Sevian	½–½	Haik Martirosyan
Amin Tabatabaei	½–½	Frederik Svane
Andrey Esipenko	½–½	Robert Hovhannisyan
S. L. Narayanan	0–1	Nodirbek Yakubboev
Artur Davtyan	1–0	Thai Dai Van Nguyen
Round 7 – 9 May 2023
Nodirbek Yakubboev	0–1	Amin Tabatabaei
Haik Martirosyan	1–0	Artur Davtyan
Robert Hovhannisyan	½–½	S. L. Narayanan
Frederik Svane	½–½	Samuel Sevian
Thai Dai Van Nguyen	½–½	Andrey Esipenko
Round 8 – 10 May 2023
Samuel Sevian	½–½	Nodirbek Yakubboev
Amin Tabatabaei	½–½	Robert Hovhannisyan
Haik Martirosyan	½–½	Frederik Svane
S. L. Narayanan	½–½	Thai Dai Van Nguyen
Artur Davtyan	½–½	Andrey Esipenko
Round 9 – 11 May 2023
Nodirbek Yakubboev	½–½	Haik Martirosyan
Robert Hovhannisyan	½–½	Samuel Sevian
Andrey Esipenko	½–½	S. L. Narayanan
Frederik Svane	0–1	Artur Davtyan
Thai Dai Van Nguyen	½–½	Amin Tabatabaei

== Standings ==
	Player	Rating	1	2	3	4	5	6	7	8	9	10	Pts.	TPR
1	Sam Sevian (USA)	2684		½	½	½	½	1	½	½	1	1	6	2755
2	Nodirbek Yakubboev (Uzbekistan)	2630	½		0	½	1	½	½	1	½	½	5	2679
3	Amin Tabatabaei (Iran)	2677	½	1		½	½	0	½	½	½	1	5	2674
4	Haik Martirosyan (Armenia)	2675	½	½	½		½	½	½	½	½	1	5	2674
5	Robert Hovhannisyan (Armenia)	2596	½	0	½	½		½	1	½	½	1	5	2683
6	Andrey Esipenko (FIDE)	2679	0	½	1	½	½		½	½	½	½	4.5	2630
7	Frederik Svane (Germany)	2600	½	½	½	½	0	½		1	½	0	4	2596
8	S. L. Narayanan (India)	2661	½	0	½	½	½	½	0		½	1	4	2589
9	Thai Dai Van Nguyen (Czech Republic)	2649	0	½	½	½	½	½	½	½		0	3.5	2554
10	Artur Davtyan (Armenia)	2506	0	½	0	0	0	½	1	0	1		3	2525
