= Jermuk (brand) =

Armenian mineral water brand

Jermuk Ջերմուկ
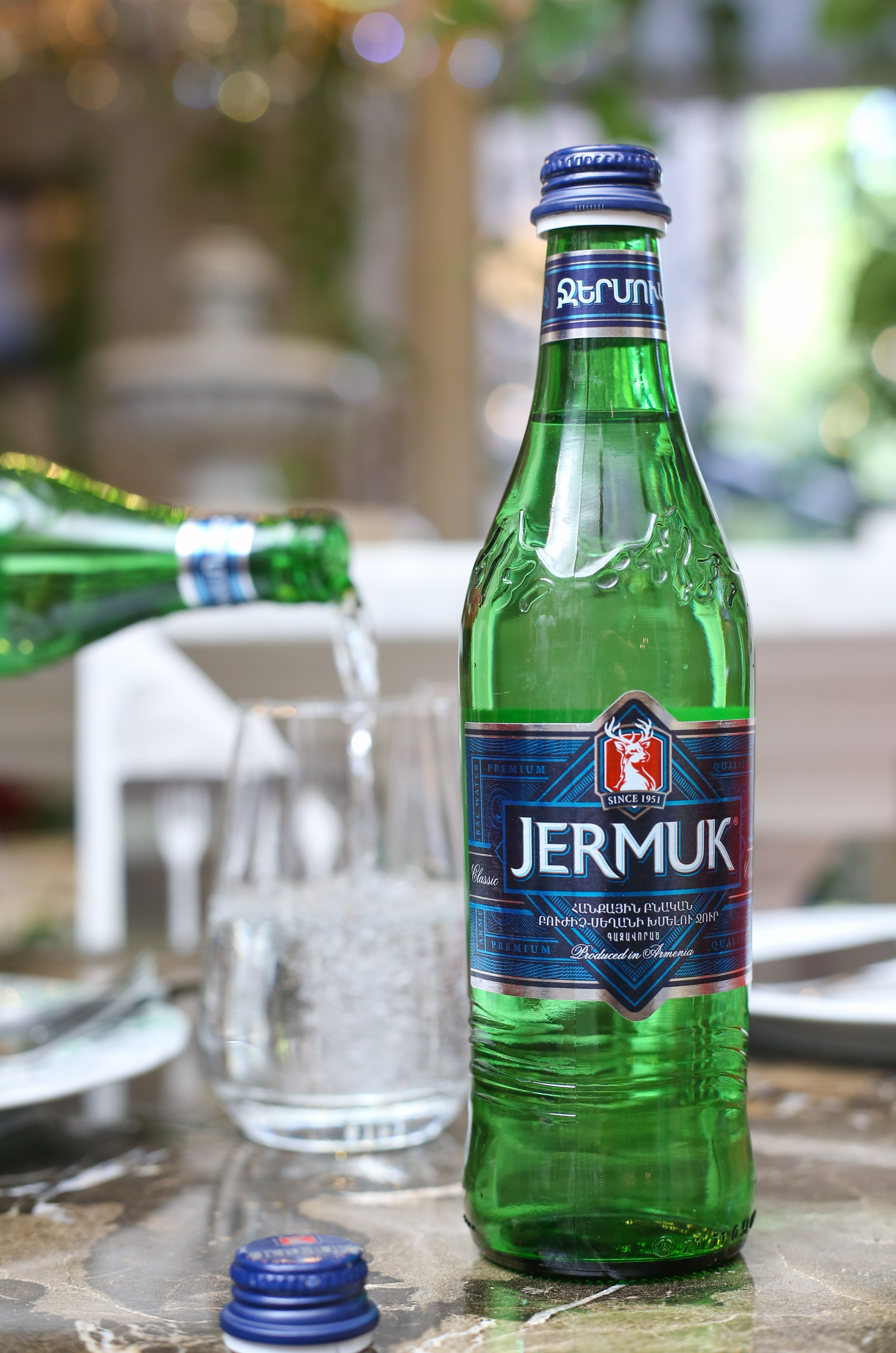
- Type: Mineral water
- Manufacturer: Jermuk Group CJSC
- Origin: Jermuk, Vayots Dzor, Armenia
- Introduced: 1951; 75 years ago
- Variants: Non-carbonated, mildly carbonated, carbonated
- Website: jermukgroup.am

Jermuk (Armenian: Ջերմուկ) is a bottled mineral water originating from the town of Jermuk in the province of Vayots Dzor, Armenia. The water has been bottled since 1951.

Currently, the brand is bottled and produced by the Jermuk Group CJSC, founded in 1999 in Jermuk, and is classified into 2 categories: Jermuk Classic mineral carbonated water, and Jermuk Millennium mineral mildly carbonated water. In 2015–16, the factory of "Jermuk Mayr Gortsaran" founded in 1951 was acquired by the Jermuk Group.

The annual production of bottled natural and mineral water in Armenia is about 12 billion drams, about 30% of which is exported. More than 1200 people work in the sphere. As of December 2017, the company was planning to produce products worth more than 5 billion drams a year, of which about 50% was going to be exported. With the construction of the new factory, the number of jobs in the company was planned to increase by about 15%.

== History ==
The area of Jermuk was first mentioned in writing in 189 AD, when the Jermuk fortress was built, with the eponymous town being founded some time later. According to historical records, Jermuk was the summer residence of the Armenian princes of the neighbouring province of Syunik.

The first surveys of the area around Jermuk (including the composition and properties of its mineral waters) were made in 1830 by the Russian geologist and engineer G. Dzoyokoyev-Boykikov; these did not result in the commercial exploitation of mineral water, however.

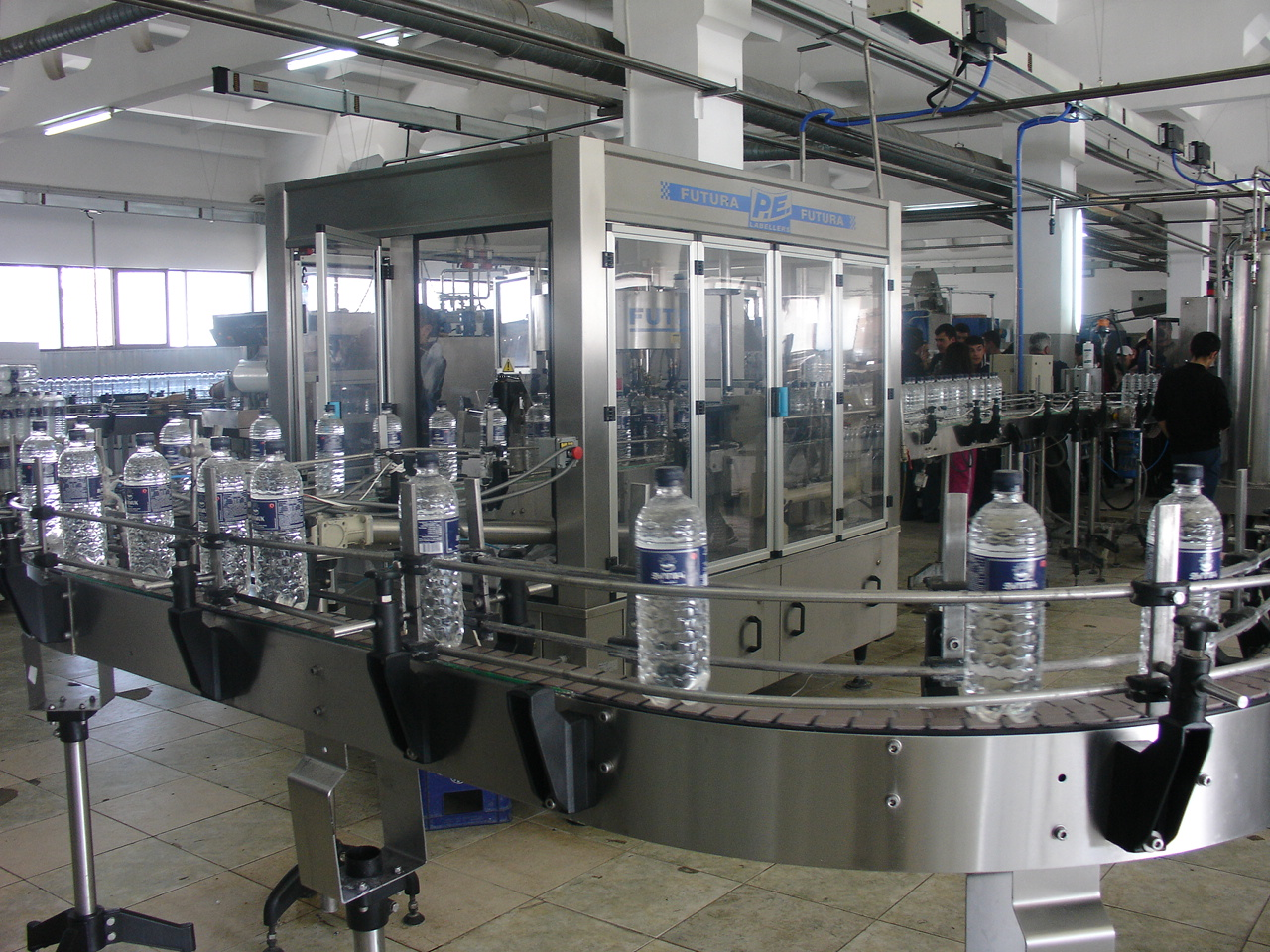
Jermuk Group CJSC

== Study ==
In 1830, the first study was conducted by G. Voskoboynikov, systematic research began in 1925, Since 1938, operation works.

== Occurrence ==
Atmospheric precipitation plays a decisive role in the formation of Mineral Waters, which penetrate deep horizons with tectonic refractions, enrichment with hot coal gas, decide some chemical components of the surrounding rock and in the form of a carbon-gas mixture comes to the surface of the Earth. Heat is transferred to groundwater and the environment, therefore, the geothermal temperature at the mineral waters site is quite high- 4-13°C.

== Chemical composition ==
Chemical composition of Jermuk mineral water:

The chemical composition, mg/l
Cations		Anions	
Sodium + Potassium, (Na + +K + )	700-1000	Sulfates, SO 4 --	400-650
Magnesium, Mg ++	40-70	Hydrocarbonates, HCO 3 -	1500-2000
Calcium, Ca ++	125-180	Chlorides, Cl -	150-280
H 2 SiO 3 : 70-120 mg/l
Total mineralization: 3.0-4.4 g/l

== FDA warning ==
May 31, 2007: the U.S. Food and Drug Administration (FDA) warned consumers in the West Chester, Pennsylvania area not to drink any Jermuk brand mineral water due to the risk of exposure to arsenic, a toxic substance and a known cause of cancer in humans. Jermuk Classic Medicinal Table Natural Sparkling Mineral Water in 0.5 liter green translucent glass bottles under the Jermuk Group brand label was recalled on 5/1/07 by AA Impex Group, Philadelphia, PA. FDA found that the product contained 536-539 micrograms of arsenic per liter of water. FDA's standard of quality for bottled water allowed no more than 10 micrograms per liter. Product could be returned to the Great Pumpkin for a refund. No illnesses were reported.
