= Ashot Arsenyan =

Armenian politician (born 1960)

- Աշոտ Արսենյան
- Born: 14 November 1960 (age 65); Gndevaz, Armenia
- Occupations: Businessman and politician

Ashot Arsenyan: (born 14 November 1960) is an Armenian businessman and politician. He is the founder and director of the company “Jermuk Group” CJSC and served as a deputy of the National Assembly of the Republic of Armenia during the 4th and 6th legislatures. Additionally, he served as mayor of the city of Jermuk from 1996 to 2002.

== Early life and education ==
Ashot Arsenyan was born in Soviet Armenia, in the village of Gndevaz, located in the Vayots Dzor region. He began his education at his village, then continued his studies at the Kapan City Construction Technical School, where he obtained his construction technician diploma in 1980. Between 1980 and 1982, he served in the Soviet Army. After his military service, he continued his studies at the Faculty of Industry and Civil Construction of the Yerevan Technical Construction University, graduating in 1986.

== Career ==
In 1993, he undertook renovation and relaunch of the mineral water factory in the city of Jermuk, bringing the factory up to European standards. In 1999, he acquired the factory and founded CJSC "Jermuk GROUP", which he has headed since then. Since 2004, Arsenyan has held the position of official distributor of PepsiCo in Armenia. In 2008, he acquired an 85% majority stake in a PepsiCo factory in Georgia, and in 2011, he founded the "Pepsi-Cola Bottler Armenia" Factory, owning 100% of the shares.

Arsenyan is founder and co-owner of the “Armenia Wellness and Spa Hotel” located in the city of Jermuk, established in 2004. He is also in the construction sector in Yerevan and Jermuk, where he is overseeing the development of a major residential complex, named "Byuregh", located on Arshakunyats Avenue in Yerevan. Arsenyan is also involved in the construction of a hotel complex in Jermuk, designed to accommodate up to 500 people.

=== Political activities ===
In 1996, Arsenyan was elected mayor of Jermuk. He was re-elected in 1999 and 2002, obtaining an absolute majority of votes in each election. In 2003, Arsenyan was elected as a deputy to the National Assembly of Armenia as a member of the Republican Party of Armenia, initially serving from 2003 to 2007 and then being re-elected from 2007 to 2012.
