= Aravindh Chithambaram =

Indian chess grandmaster (born 1999)

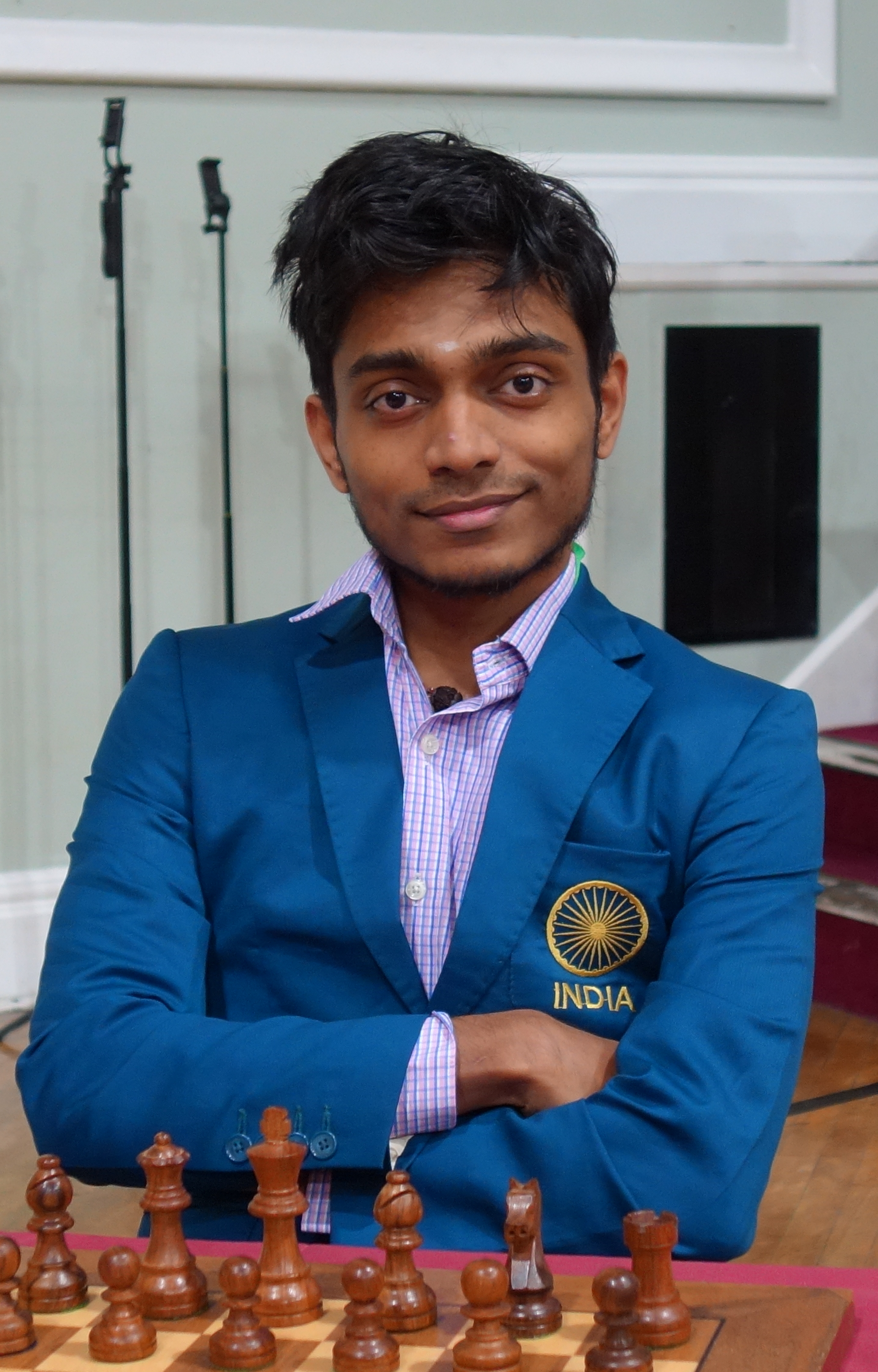
- Aravindh in 2023

Personal information
- Born: Aravindh Chithambaram Veerappan; 11 September 1999 (age 27) Thirunagar, Tamil Nadu, India

Chess career
- Country: India
- Title: Grandmaster (2015)
- FIDE rating: 2673 (November 2026)
- Peak rating: 2749 (April 2025)
- Ranking: No. 45 (November 2026)
- Peak ranking: No. 11 (April 2025)

Aravindh Chithambaram Veerappan (born 11 September 1999) is an Indian chess grandmaster. He won the Indian chess championships twice, in 2018 and 2019.

== Personal life ==
Aravindh Chithambaram Veerappan was born on 11 September 1999 in Thirunagar, Madurai, Tamil Nadu. His father died when he was three and his mother worked as a Life Insurance Corporation agent to support the family. He learned to play chess at the age of seven from his paternal grandfather, who introduced him to the game in an attempt to quell his desires to constantly leave the house and play cricket with other boys.

== Chess career ==
Aravindh won the Indian U19 Chess Championship at the age of 12. He competed in the World U14 Chess Championship in 2012, placing second to Kayden Troff.

He won his first major tournament in 2013 when he scored 9/11 for a performance rating of 2728 at the Chennai Grandmaster International Open, defeating four grandmasters and two international masters in the process. This result earned him his first grandmaster norm; at the time he had not achieved any of his international master norms.

He earned his international master title in 2014 and his grandmaster title in 2015.

In November 2024, Aravindh won the Chennai Grand Masters tournament, scoring 4½/7, before winning the blitz tie-breaks (2–0) against former World Rapid and Blitz Champion Levon Aronian. His overall tournament win was possible after a crucial win in Round 6 of the event against Arjun Erigaisi.

In March 2025, Aravindh won the 2025 Prague Chess Festival Masters by a full point. He went undefeated and scored 6/9 in the event, winning 3 games.

In June 2025, Aravindh won the Stepan Avagyan Memorial in Jermuk on Sonneborn-Berger tiebreak against R Praggnanandhaa. He went undefeated and scored 6.5/9 in the event winning 4 games.

In April 2025, Aravindh and Nihal Sarin were signed by S8UL Esports, an Indian esports organization. They represented S8UL in their bid for the 2025 Esports World Cup, although Aravindh failed to qualify.

In May 2026, Aravindh won the Road to EWC qualifier at DreamHack Atlanta, defeating Alexey Sarana in the grand final to become the first Indian player to qualify for the 2026 Esports World Cup Chess event, representing S8UL Esports.

In August 2026, Aravindh competed in the 2026 Esports World Cup – Chess Play-In in Paris. He lost his Upper Bracket match to Alexander Grischuk 1–2 after winning game two to force an Armageddon decider, then was eliminated from the Lower Bracket by Parham Maghsoodloo, ending his run at the tournament; he received $23,000 in prize money for his performance.
