= Samuel Sevian =

American chess grandmaster (born 2000)

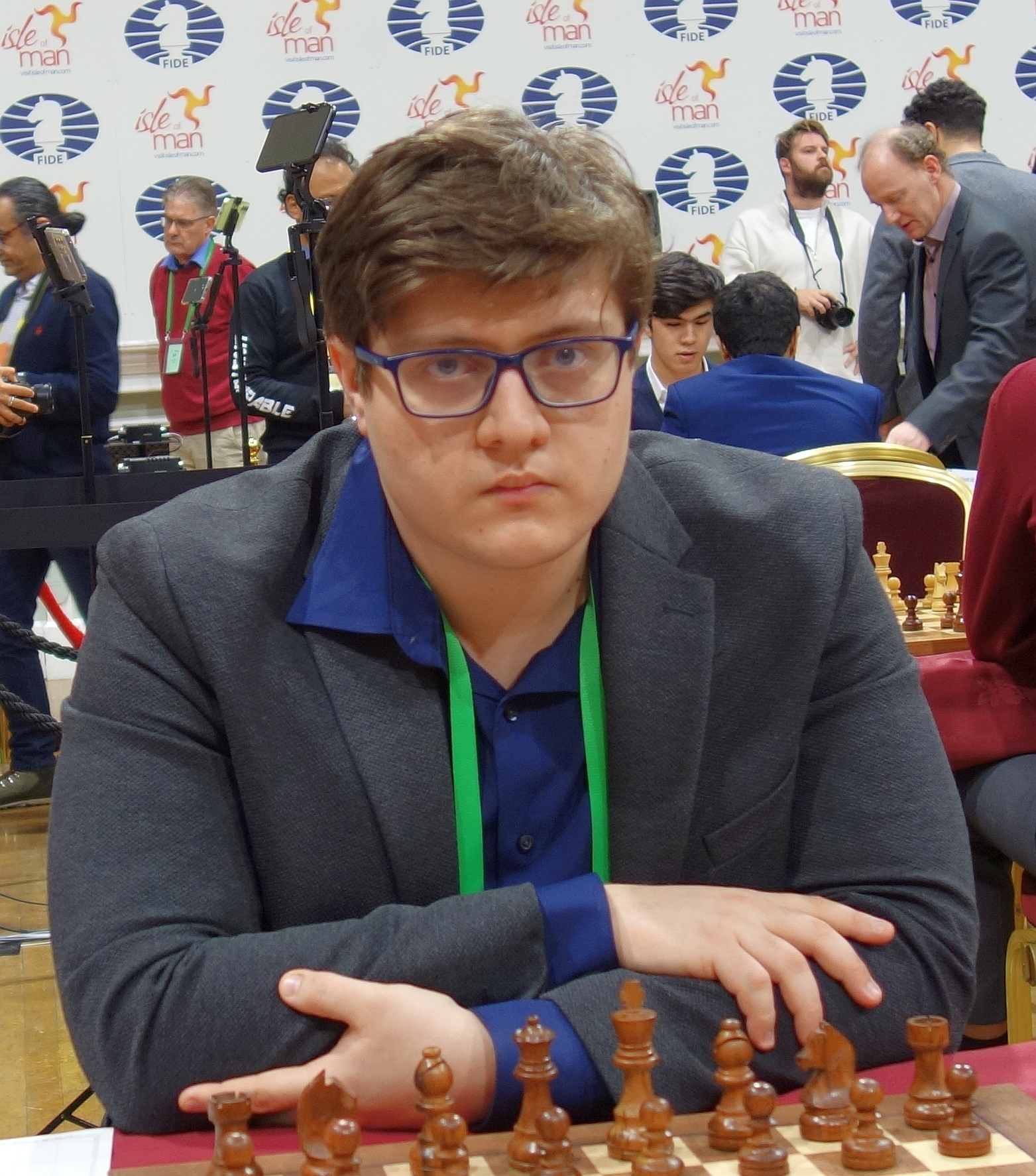
- Sevian in 2023

Personal information
- Born: December 26, 2000 (age 25) Corning, New York, U.S.

Chess career
- Country: United States
- Title: Grandmaster (2014)
- FIDE rating: 2684 (November 2026)
- Peak rating: 2708 (September 2026)
- Ranking: No. 40 (November 2026)
- Peak ranking: No. 29 (September 2026)

Samuel Sevian (born December 26, 2000) is an American chess grandmaster. A former chess prodigy, he earned the grandmaster title at the age of 13 years, 10 months and 27 days, making him the youngest ever American grandmaster at the time. He also broke all US age records in reaching the titles of National and International Master.

== Background ==
Sevian was born in Corning, New York, to Armine and Armen Sevian, both of Armenian heritage. His father, Armen, held the title of candidate master in Soviet Armenia before moving to the United States in 1996 for his PhD studies. As of 2015, Armen was the principal scientist for a laser manufacturing company near Boston.

== Early career ==
Sevian started to play chess at the age of 5 and his first major success came in 2009 when he broke the record for the youngest Expert in USCF history at 8 years, 2 months of age, beating Brian Luo's previous record by over 10 months. On December 9, 2010, Sevian became the youngest National Master in USCF history at 9 years, 11 months, and 23 days, beating Nicholas Nip's record by 3 days. In 2012, he completed all the norms required for the title of International Master (IM) in the space of 6 months. He became an IM after crossing the 2400 FIDE rating mark during Norm tournament in November 2013 in Budapest, thus setting the new US record of 12 years, 10 months.

In November 2012, he became the World Champion in the U12 category at the World Youth Chess Championships in Maribor, Slovenia. In May 2013, Sevian was invited to play in the U.S. Chess Championship in St. Louis as the youngest ever participant. The field consisted of 24 players and Sevian scored 4/9 points, which placed him in shared 14th place ahead of several grandmasters.

In November 2014 Sevian became a Grandmaster at the age of 13 years, 10 months, and 27 days, a new US record. After completing all three norms required for the title at the Foxwoods Open in January 2014, Saint Louis GM Invitational in May and Washington International in August 2014 at age 13 years and 7 months, he then completed the final requirement for the title by reaching over a FIDE rating of 2500 during the Saint Louis GM Norm Invitational tournament, which he won convincingly with the score of 7½/9 points.

=== 2015 ===
He took part in the Tata Steel Challengers event in January 2015, sharing fifth place with a score of 7½/13 points. Sevian shared fifth place in the US Chess Championship 2015, beating Wesley So, a world top ten ranked player, and drawing with Hikaru Nakamura as well as defending champion Gata Kamsky. This performance earned him a spot in the Chess World Cup 2015, where he drew both classical games against Teimour Radjabov in the first round of the tournament but was eliminated in the rapid playoff.

=== 2017 ===
In June 2017, Sevian won the American Continental Chess Championship in Medellín, Colombia, which in that year had assembled the best Grandmasters of the Western Hemisphere, scoring 8½/11 points with superior tiebreak. Winning this coveted Cup at the age of 16, Sevian yet again added a new age record to the long list of his achievements, now as the youngest ever American Continental Champion. In September, he participated in the Chess World Cup 2017. He defeated Liviu Dieter Nisipeanu in the first round, then was defeated by Li Chao in the second round and eliminated from the tournament.

=== 2019 ===
In 2019, he participated in the Chess World Cup 2019. He defeated Aryan Tari in the first round, then was defeated by Sergey Karjakin in the second round and eliminated from the tournament. Also, in 2019 Sevian represented the US National Team at the World Team Championship in Astana, Kazakhstan. He won the Individual Bronze medal for his performance on the second board.

=== 2021 ===
Sevian participated in the Chess World Cup 2021. He defeated Sumant Subramaniam in the first round and Benjamin Bok in the second round, then was defeated by eventual winner Jan-Krzysztof Duda in the third round and eliminated from the tournament.

Sevian finished the United States Championship tied for first with the same score 6.5/11 as Fabiano Caruana and the eventual tie-break winner Wesley So, with a performance rating of 2747, higher than that of all the competitors.

=== 2022 ===
In April 2022 Sevian participated in the first edition of the American Cup, a double elimination tournament where he defeated Wesley So in the classical match, before being knocked out by Fabiano Caruana in rapid tiebreaks, ultimately being eliminated by Ray Robson in the elimination bracket in rapid. This pushed him above 2700 for the first time.

=== 2023 ===
In May, Sevian won the Stepan Avagyan Memorial 2023 with a dominating score of 6/9, a full point ahead of Nodirbek Yakubboev, Robert Hovhannisyan, Haik M. Martirosyan, and Amin Tabatabaei.

In September, Sevian won the annual Chess9LX event hosted by the St. Louis Chess Club.

=== 2025 ===
Sevian participated in the Chess World Cup 2025. He defeated Tin Jingyao in the second round (he received a bye for the first round), Evgeniy Najer in the third round, and Lorenzo Lodici in the fourth round. He was knocked out in the fifth round by Wei Yi, who eventually placed second.

=== 2026 ===
In June, Sevian won the Stepan Avagyan Memorial 2026 with two consecutive wins in the last two rounds, including his dramatic last round victory over Aravindh Chithambaram. He secured the tournament victory over Vladislav Artemiev because Artemiev had inferior tiebreaks. This marked his second victory of the Stepan Avagyan Memorial.

Following the withdrawal of Alireza Firouzja, Sevian was invited to the Sinquefield Cup as a Wildcard participant. He finished in a tied 5th-8th with a score of 4.5/9.

Achievements
Preceded by Nicholas Nip	Youngest ever United States chessmaster 2010–13	Succeeded by Awonder Liang
Preceded by Ray Robson	Youngest ever United States International Master; 2013-2015	Succeeded by Awonder Liang
Preceded by Ray Robson	Youngest ever United States Grandmaster; 2014-2021	Succeeded by Abhimanyu Mishra
