= Thirunagar =

- Neighbourhood
- Thirunagar (Madurai)
- Coordinates: 9°53′19.3″N 78°02′58.2″E
- Country: India
- State: Tamil Nadu
- District: Madurai

Government
  - Type: Municipal Corporation
  - Body: Madurai City Municipal Corporation

Area
  - Total: 6.5 km^{2} (2.5 sq mi)
  - Rank: 22 in Madurai
- Elevation: 177 m (581 ft)

Population (2022)
  - Total: 29,424
  - Rank: 12
  - Density: 4,500/km^{2} (12,000/sq mi)

Languages
  - Official: Tamil Sourashtra Telugu
- Time zone: UTC+5:30 (IST)
- PIN: 625006
- Telephone code: 91-452
- Vehicle registration: TN 58

Thirunagar is a neighborhood within the Madurai district in the Indian state of Tamil Nadu.

Thirunagar (English:Thirunagar) is the 98th Ward of the 4th Mandal of Madurai Corporation in Madurai District in the Indian state of Tamil Nadu. It was earlier part of Thirunagar Municipal Corporation. During the expansion of Madurai Corporation, municipalities like Thirunagar, Thiruparangunram, Harvipatti etc. were merged with Madurai Corporation.

== Demographics ==
As of the 2011 India census, Thirunagar had a population of 16,598, up from 15,549 from 2001. Males constitute 49.7% of the population and females 51.2%. Thirunagar has an average literacy rate of 87.4%, higher than the national average of 59.5%: male literacy is 89.1%, and female literacy is 85.7%. In Thirunagar, 8.4% of the population is under 6 years of age.

== Sports ==
Thirunagar has a 26-year-old cricket club known as Thirunagar Rainbow cricket club, which is the only cricket team from Thirunagar playing in the league of MDCA. The Thirunagar Hockey Club has won the state championships and several other senior tournaments.

== Transport ==
Thirunagar lies on the main road connecting Madurai and Thirumangalam. It is 10.3 km (6.4 mi) away from Periyar Bus Stand and Madurai Junction Railway Station and 13.2 km (8.2 mi) away from M.G.R. Bus Stand.

The nearest railway station is Thiruparankundram Railway Station which is 2.6 km (1.6 mi) away.

The nearest airport is Madurai Airport at Avaniyapuram which is 13.2 km (8.2 mi) away.
