= Vitaly Sivuk =

Ukrainian-Swedish chess grandmaster (born 1992)

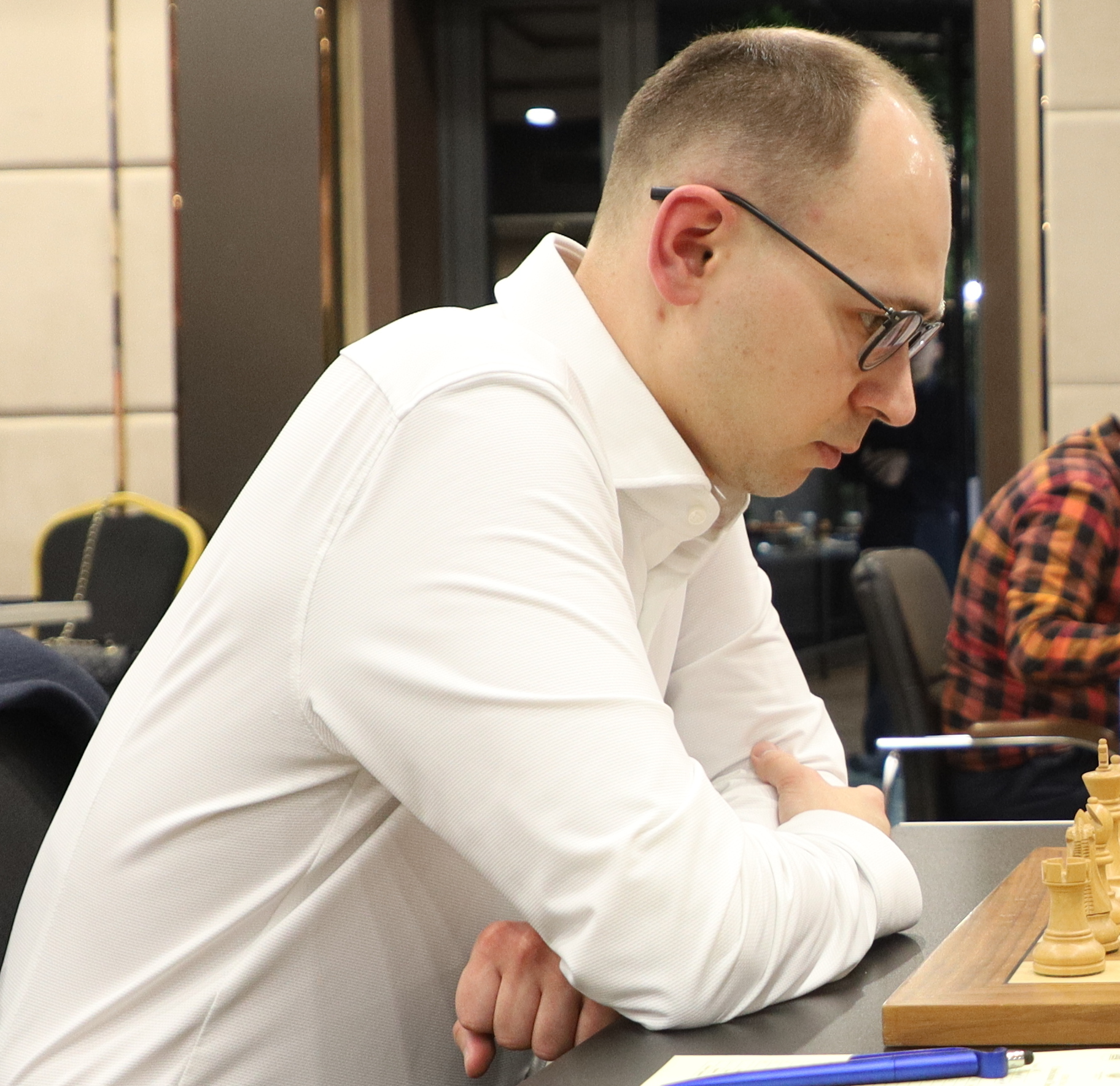
- Sivuk in 2025

Personal information
- Born: January 1, 1992 (age 34) Mykolaiv, Ukraine

Chess career
- Country: Ukraine (until 2022); Sweden (since 2022)
- Title: Grandmaster (2014)
- FIDE rating: 2481 (November 2026)
- Peak rating: 2600 (October 2022)

Vitaly Olegovich Sivuk is a Ukrainian-Swedish chess grandmaster.

== Chess career ==
In September 2023, he tied for first place with Mitrabha Guha, Aditya Bagus Arfan, and J. Deepan Chakkravarthy in the Malaysian Open. He won the tournament based on tiebreak scores.

In January 2024, he won the Rilton Cup with a score of 7.5/9, half a point ahead of runners-up Yahli Sokolovsky and Yair Parkhov.

In June 2024, he won the Futures section of the UzChess Cup.

In July 2024, he won the Swedish Chess Championship, defending his title from the previous year. He had four consecutive wins, and drew all of his remaining games, finishing the tournament with half a point ahead of runner-up Jonny Hector.

In 2025, in Riga he won Riga Christmas Chess Festival Master's tournament.
