= Yahli Sokolovsky =

Israeli chess grandmaster (born 2006)

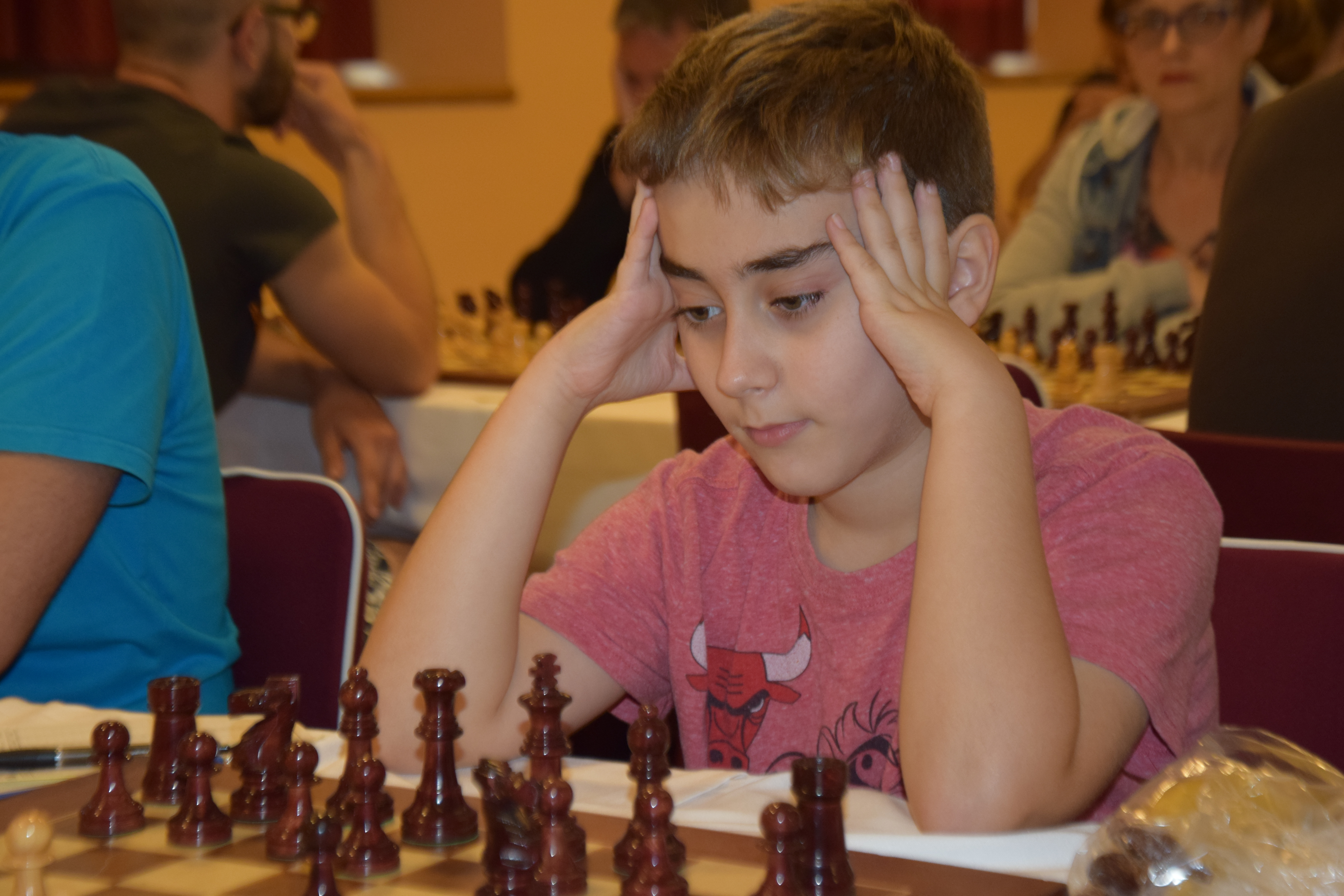
- Sokolovsky in 2017

Personal information
- Native name: יהלי סוקולובסקי
- Born: September 21, 2006 (age 19) Kiryat Ono, Israel

Chess career
- Country: Israel
- Title: Grandmaster (2024)
- FIDE rating: 2558 (July 2026)
- Peak rating: 2567 (February 2026)

Yahli Sokolovsky (Hebrew: יהלי סוקולובסקי) is an Israeli chess grandmaster.

== Chess career ==
In December 2022, he finished in 4th place in the Israeli Chess Championship.

In January 2024, he finished in joint second place with Yair Parkhov at the Rilton Cup with a score of 7/9, half a point behind winner Vitaly Sivuk. This earned him his final GM norm, and he later achieved the title after surpassing 2500 rating points in July 2024.

In August 2024, he finished in joint second place with Anton Korobov, Frederik Svane, David Gavrilescu, Evgeny Romanov, and Andrey Sumets at the Dortmund Sparkassen Chess Meeting with a score of 7/9, half a point behind winner Nico Zwirs.

In November 2024, he was one of 10 players who maintained a perfect score in the first three rounds of the European Individual Chess Championship.
