= Dortmund Sparkassen Chess Meeting =

Annual elite chess tournament in Germany

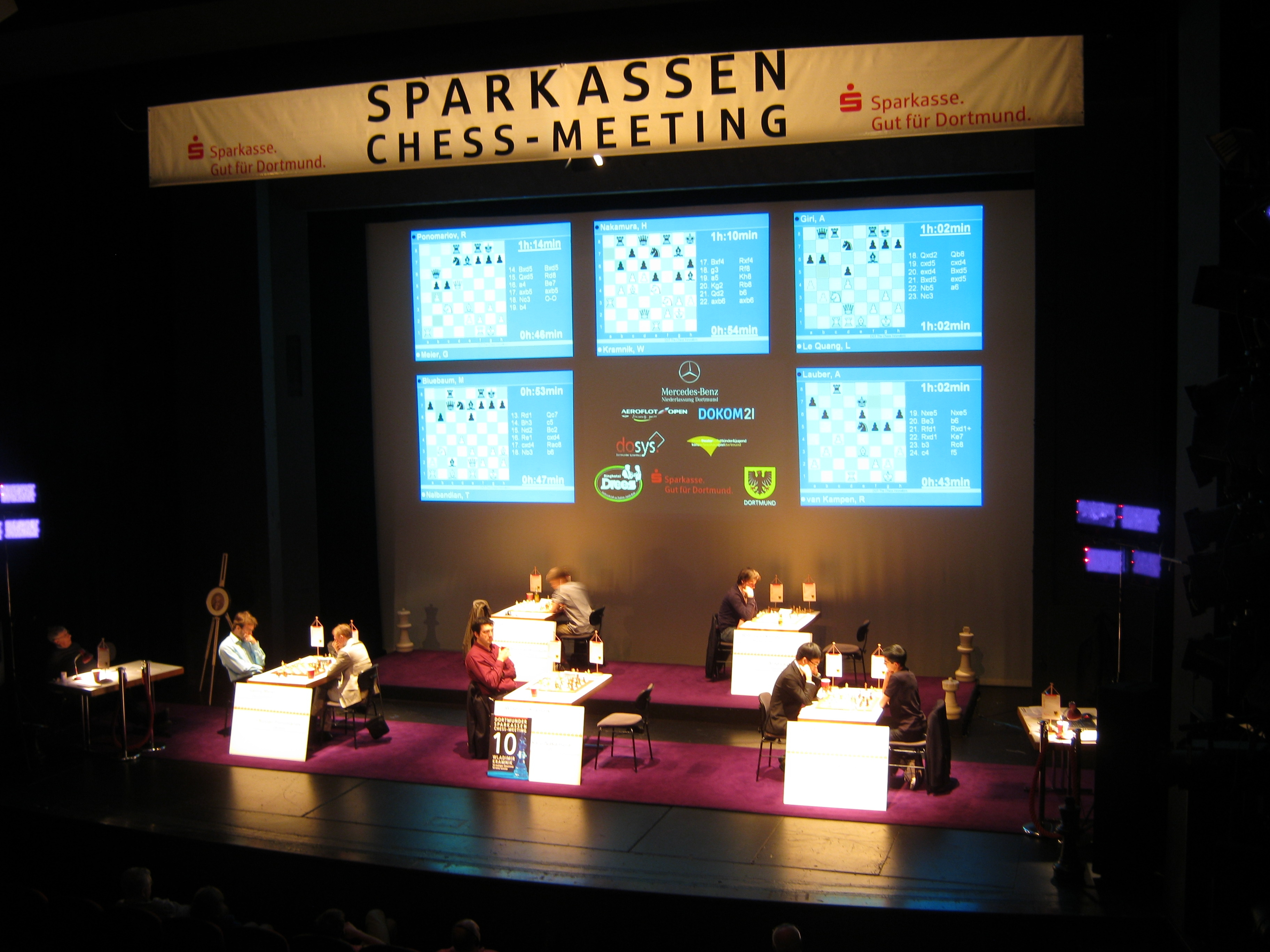
- Chess Meeting 2011

Tournament information
- Sport: Chess
- Location: Dortmund, Germany
- Established: 1973
- Defunct: 2019
- Format: Round-robin tournament
- Most championships: (Russia) Vladimir Kramnik (10)

Final champion
- (United States) Leinier Dominguez

The Dortmund Sparkassen Chess Meeting is an open chess tournament held every summer in Dortmund, Germany. Until 2020, Dortmund was an invite-only event, with the exception that one slot at Dortmund was awarded to the winner of the annual Aeroflot Open in Moscow. After an interruption due to the COVID-19 pandemic, the meeting was relaunched as the Sparkassen Chess Trophy International Dortmund Chess Days.

The elite tournament was usually played in a round-robin or double round-robin format. However, it took the form of a series of heads-up matches in 2002 and 2004. The 2002 Dortmund event was also notable in that it served as the Candidates Tournament for the Classical World Chess Championship 2004. Péter Lékó won, defeating Veselin Topalov in the finals.

A flagship event of the newer incarnation is the "No Castling Masters", played according to No Castling Chess rules. It is accompanied by large open events and invite-only cup competitions.

The title sponsor is Sparkasse Dortmund, the local public savings bank.

== List of winners ==
#	Year	Winner
(1)	1928	(Germany) Fritz Sämisch
(2)	1951	(Belgium) Albéric O'Kelly de Galway
(3)	1961	(Soviet Union) Mark Taimanov
1	1973	(Finland) Heikki Westerinen
2	1974	(Hungary) László Szabó
3	1975	(Finland) Heikki Westerinen
4	1976	(Soviet Union) Oleg Romanishin
5	1977	(Czech Republic) Jan Smejkal
6	1978	(Sweden) Ulf Andersson
7	1979	(Soviet Union) Tamaz Giorgadze
8	1980	(England) Raymond Keene
9	1981	(Soviet Union) Gennady Kuzmin
10	1982	(Czech Republic) Vlastimil Hort
11	1983	(Romania) Mihai Șubă
12	1984	(Israel) Yehuda Gruenfeld
13	1985	(Soviet Union) Yuri Razuvayev
14	1986	(Hungary) Zoltán Ribli
15	1987	(Soviet Union) Yuri Balashov
16	1988	(Soviet Union) Smbat Lputian
17	1989	(Soviet Union) Efim Geller
18	1990	(Soviet Union) Alexander Chernin
19	1991	(Czech Republic) Igor Štohl
20	1992	(Russia) Garry Kasparov
21	1993	(Russia) Anatoly Karpov
22	1994	(Netherlands) Jeroen Piket
23	1995	(Russia) Vladimir Kramnik
24	1996	(Russia) Vladimir Kramnik (Note: With the same score as Viswanathan Anand; won on tiebreak because of higher Sonneborn–Berger score.)
25	1997	(Russia) Vladimir Kramnik
26	1998	(Russia) Vladimir Kramnik (Note: With the same score as Michael Adams and Peter Svidler; won on tiebreak because of higher Sonneborn–Berger score.)
27	1999	(Hungary) Peter Leko
28	2000	(Russia) Vladimir Kramnik (Note: With the same score as Viswanathan Anand; won on tiebreak because of higher Sonneborn–Berger score.)
29	2001	(Russia) Vladimir Kramnik (Note: With the same score as Veselin Topalov; won on tiebreak.)
30	2002	(Hungary) Peter Leko
31	2003	(Moldova) Victor Bologan
32	2004	(India) Viswanathan Anand
33	2005	(Germany) Arkadij Naiditsch
34	2006	(Russia) Vladimir Kramnik (Note: With the same score as Peter Svidler; won on tiebreak because of higher Sonneborn–Berger score.)
35	2007	(Russia) Vladimir Kramnik
36	2008	(Hungary) Peter Leko
37	2009	(Russia) Vladimir Kramnik
38	2010	(Ukraine) Ruslan Ponomariov
39	2011	(Russia) Vladimir Kramnik
40	2012	(Italy) Fabiano Caruana (Note: With the same score as Sergey Karjakin; won on tiebreak because of more wins.)
41	2013	(England) Michael Adams
42	2014	(Italy) Fabiano Caruana
43	2015	(United States) Fabiano Caruana
44	2016	(France) Maxime Vachier-Lagrave
45	2017	(Poland) Radosław Wojtaszek
46	2018	(Russia) Ian Nepomniachtchi
47	2019	(United States) Leinier Domínguez
48	2021	(India) Viswanathan Anand (No Castling match) (Ukraine) Pavel Eljanov (Grand Prix)
49	2022	(Germany) Dmitrij Kollars (No Castling Masters) (Ukraine) Pavel Eljanov (Grand Prix)
50	2023	(United States) Fabiano Caruana (No Castling Masters)
51	2024	(Netherlands) Nico Zwirs (Open A)
52	2025	(Germany) Matthias Blübaum (Open A)
53	2026	(Norway) Elham Amar (Open A)

== Events by year ==
=== 1990s ===
==== 1993 ====
21st Sparkassen Chess-Meeting, SuperGM group, 10–17 April 1993, Dortmund, Cat. XVI (2637)
	Player	Rating	1	2	3	4	5	6	7	8	Points	SB	TPR
1	Anatoly Karpov (Russia)	2725		½	1	1	1	0	1	1	5½		2854
2	Vladimir Kramnik (Russia)	2685	½		½	½	½	½	1	½	4	13.25	2680
3	Christopher Lutz (Germany)	2550	0	½		½	½	½	1	1	4	11.50	2699
4	Gata Kamsky (United States)	2655	0	½	½		1	1	0	½	3½	11.50	2634
5	Sergey Dolmatov (Russia)	2615	0	½	½	0		1	½	1	3½	10.25	2640
6	Joël Lautier (France)	2645	1	½	½	0	0		½	½	3		2586
7	Grigory Serper (Uzbekistan)	2600	0	0	0	1	½	½		½	2½		2540
8	Eric Lobron (Germany)	2620	0	½	0	½	0	½	½		2		2481

==== 1994 ====
22nd Sparkassen Chess-Meeting, SuperGM group, 15–24 July 1994, Dortmund, Cat. XVI (2640)
	Player	Rating	1	2	3	4	5	6	7	8	9	10	Points	SB	TPR
1	Jeroen Piket (Netherlands)	2640		½	1	½	1	1	½	½	1	½	6½		2806
2	Michael Adams (England)	2640	½		½	0	0	1	1	½	1	1	5½		2720
3	Vladimir Epishin (Russia)	2650	0	½		1	½	½	½	1	½	½	5		2682
4	Artur Yusupov (Germany)	2655	½	1	0		½	½	½	0	1	½	4½	20.00	2638
5	Alexey Dreev (Russia)	2650	0	1	½	½		½	½	½	0	1	4½	19.75	2639
6	Viktor Korchnoi (Switzerland)	2615	0	0	½	½	½		1	1	0	1	4½	18.50	2643
7	Anatoly Karpov (Russia)	2780	½	0	½	½	½	0		½	1	1	4½	18.25	2624
8	Jan Timman (Netherlands)	2635	½	½	0	1	½	0	½		½	½	4		2598
9	Christopher Lutz (Germany)	2580	0	0	½	0	1	1	0	½		0	3	13.50	2522
10	Peter Leko (Hungary)	2555	½	0	½	½	0	0	0	½	1		3	13.00	2524

==== 1995 ====
23rd Sparkassen Chess-Meeting, SuperGM group, 14–23 July 1995, Dortmund, Cat. XVII (2666)
	Player	Rating	1	2	3	4	5	6	7	8	9	10	Points	SB	TPR
1	Vladimir Kramnik (Russia)	2730		½	½	1	½	1	1	½	1	1	7		2877
2	Anatoly Karpov (Russia)	2775	½		½	½	1	½	½	1	1	1	6½		2818
3	Peter Leko (Hungary)	2605	½	½		½	½	½	½	1	0	1	5	21.00	2714
4	Vassily Ivanchuk (Ukraine)	2740	0	½	½		½	½	½	1	1	½	5	20.00	2699
5	Joël Lautier (France)	2645	½	0	½	½		½	1	½	1	0	4½		2668
6	Nigel Short (England)	2645	0	½	½	½	½		½	0	1	½	4	17.00	2624
7	Jeroen Piket (Netherlands)	2625	0	½	½	½	0	½		½	½	1	4	15.75	2626
8	Evgeny Bareev (Russia)	2650	½	0	0	0	½	1	½		0	1	3½	13.75	2586
9	Alexander Beliavsky (Ukraine)	2650	0	0	1	0	0	0	½	1		1	3½	12.50	2586
10	Eric Lobron (Germany)	2595	0	0	0	½	1	½	0	0	0		2		2452

==== 1996 ====
24th Sparkassen Chess-Meeting, SuperGM group, 5–14 July 1996, Dortmund, Cat. XVIII (2676)
	Player	Rating	1	2	3	4	5	6	7	8	9	10	Points	SB	TPR
1	Vladimir Kramnik (Russia)	2765		½	½	1	1	1	½	1	1	½	7	28.50	2886
2	Viswanathan Anand (India)	2735	½		½	½	1	½	1	1	1	1	7	27.25	2889
3	Boris Gelfand (Belarus)	2665	½	½		½	½	1	½	½	1	1	6		2802
4	Michael Adams (England)	2685	0	½	½		0	½	1	½	½	1	4½	17.50	2675
5	Judit Polgár (Hungary)	2665	0	0	½	1		½	1	0	1	½	4½	17.00	2677
6	Alexei Shirov (Spain)	2685	0	½	0	½	½		½	1	0	1	4	15.50	2632
7	Veselin Topalov (Bulgaria)	2750	½	0	½	0	0	½		½	1	1	4	14.75	2624
8	Robert Hübner (Germany)	2595	0	0	½	½	1	0	½		½	½	3½		2605
9	Eric Lobron (Germany)	2585	0	0	0	½	0	1	0	½		½	2½		2520
10	Peter Leko (Hungary)	2630	½	0	0	0	½	0	0	½	½		2		2461

==== 1997 ====
25th Sparkassen Chess-Meeting, SuperGM group, 4–13 July 1997, Dortmund, Cat. XVIII (2700)
	Player	Rating	1	2	3	4	5	6	7	8	9	10	Points	TPR	Place
1	Vladimir Kramnik (Russia)	2770		½	½	1	1	½	1	½	½	1	6½	2857	1
2	Viswanathan Anand (India)	2765	½		0	1	½	½	½	1	½	1	5½	2772	2
3	Veselin Topalov (Bulgaria)	2745	½	1		½	0	½	½	½	½	1	5	2737	3–4
4	Vassily Ivanchuk (Ukraine)	2725	0	0	½		½	1	½	1	1	½	5	2739	3–4
5	Judit Polgár (Hungary)	2670	0	½	1	½		½	½	1	½	0	4½	2702	5
6	Boris Gelfand (Belarus)	2695	½	½	½	0	½		½	½	½	½	4	2657	6–8
7	Anatoly Karpov (Russia)	2745	0	½	½	½	½	½		0	½	1	4	2651	6–8
8	Nigel Short (England)	2660	½	0	½	0	0	½	1		1	½	4	2660	6–8
9	Robert Hübner (Germany)	2580	½	½	½	0	½	½	½	0		½	3½	2632	9
10	Artur Yusupov (Germany)	2640	0	0	0	½	1	½	0	½	½		3	2581	10

(Germany) GM Romuald Mainka won Open A tournament with the result 7½ out of 9.

==== 1998 ====
26th Sparkassen Chess-Meeting, SuperGM group, 26 June – 5 July 1998, Dortmund, Cat. XVIII (2699)
	Player	Rating	1	2	3	4	5	6	7	8	9	10	Points	SB	TPR
1	Vladimir Kramnik (Russia)	2790		½	1	½	½	½	1	½	½	1	6	25.75	2813
2	Michael Adams (England)	2670	½		½	½	½	1	½	1	1	½	6	25.00	2827
3	Peter Svidler (Russia)	2690	0	½		1	1	½	½	1	½	1	6	24.50	2825
4	Peter Leko (Hungary)	2670	½	½	0		½	½	1	½	½	1	5		2745
5	Vassily Ivanchuk (Ukraine)	2740	½	½	0	½		½	½	½	½	1	4½		2694
6	Viswanathan Anand (India)	2770	½	0	½	½	½		½	½	½	½	4	17.50	2648
7	Artur Yusupov (Germany)	2630	0	½	½	0	½	½		½	1	½	4	16.50	2663
8	Zoltán Almási (Hungary)	2630	½	0	0	½	½	½	½		1	½	4	16.00	2663
9	Alexander Beliavsky (Slovenia)	2690	½	0	½	½	½	½	0	0		½	3		2575
10	Alexei Shirov (Spain)	2710	0	½	0	0	0	½	½	½	½		2½		2531

==== 1999 ====
27th Sparkassen Chess-Meeting, SuperGM group, 10–17 July 1999, Dortmund, Cat. XIX (2705)
	Player	Rating	1	2	3	4	5	6	7	8	Points	TPR
1	Peter Leko (Hungary)	2701		½	½	½	1	½	1	1	5	2863
2	Vladimir Kramnik (Russia)	2760	½		½	½	½	½	1	1	4½	2798
3	Anatoly Karpov (Russia)	2700	½	½		½	½	1	½	½	4	2755
4	Viswanathan Anand (India)	2771	½	½	½		½	½	½	1	4	2745
5	Michael Adams (England)	2708	0	½	½	½		½	1	1	4	2754
6	Ivan Sokolov (Bosnia and Herzegovina)	2656	½	½	0	½	½		0	½	2½	2609
7	Veselin Topalov (Bulgaria)	2690	0	0	½	½	0	1		0	2	2548
8	Jan Timman (Netherlands)	2650	0	0	½	0	0	½	1		2	2554

27th Sparkassen Chess-Meeting, Masters Event, 9–17 July 1999, Dortmund, Germany, Category X (2482)
	Player	Rating	1	2	3	4	5	6	7	8	9	10	Points	TPR
1	GM Eckhard Schmittdiel (Germany)	2505		½	1	½	½	0	½	1	1	1	6	2604
2	GM Zoltán Varga (Hungary)	2541	½		0	½	½	1	½	1	1	1	6	2600
3	IM Michael Feygin (Ukraine)	2500	0	1		½	½	½	1	0	½	1	5	2523
4	GM Arshak Petrosian (Armenia)	2514	½	½	½		½	½	½	½	½	1	5	2521
5	GM Klaus Bischoff (Germany)	2509	½	½	½	½		½	½	1	½	0	4½	2479
6	GM Adrian Mikhalchishin (Slovenia)	2552	1	0	½	½	½		½	½	½	0	4	2431
7	IM Alisa Marić (Federal Republic of Yugoslavia)	2489	½	½	0	½	½	½		½	½	½	4	2438
8	FM Arkadij Naiditsch (Germany)	2417	0	0	1	½	0	½	½		½	1	4	2446
9	IM Dirk Poldauf (Germany)	2453	0	0	½	½	½	½	½	½		1	4	2442
10	Gregor Mainka (Germany)	2340	0	0	0	0	1	1	½	0	0		2½	2331

17-year-old (Germany) Olaf Wegener won Open A Swiss-system tournament with the score 8/10.

=== 2000s ===
==== 2000 ====
28th Dortmund Sparkassen Chess Meeting (July 7 – 16, 2000)

28th Sparkassen Chess-Meeting, SuperGM group, 7–16 July 2000, Dortmund, Category XIX (2702)
	Player	Rating	1	2	3	4	5	6	7	8	9	10	Points	SB	TPR
1	Vladimir Kramnik (Russia)	2770		1	0	½	1	1	½	½	½	1	6	25.75	2789
2	Viswanathan Anand (India)	2762	0		1	½	½	½	1	½	1	1	6	23.75	2836
3	Michael Adams (England)	2755	1	0		½	½	½	½	½	1	½	5	21.75	2739
4	Peter Leko (Hungary)	2743	½	½	½		½	0	½	1	½	1	5	20.75	2792
5	Vladimir Akopian (Armenia)	2660	0	½	½	½		½	½	1	1	½	5	20.75	2750
6	Deep Junior 6 (Israel)		0	½	½	1	½		½	½	0	1	4½		2702
7	Alexander Khalifman (Russia)	2667	½	0	½	½	½	½		½	½	½	4	17.50	2664
8	Evgeny Bareev (Russia)	2702	½	½	½	0	0	½	½		½	1	4	16.50	2659
9	Jeroen Piket (Netherlands)	2649	½	0	0	½	0	1	½	½		½	3½		2568
10	Robert Hübner (Germany)	2615	0	0	½	0	½	0	½	0	½		2		2520

28th Sparkassen Chess-Meeting, GM group, 7–16 July 2000, Dortmund, Category IX (2456)
	Player	Rating	1	2	3	4	5	6	7	8	9	10	Points	TPR
1	GM Eckhard Schmittdiel (Germany)	2490		0	1	½	½	1	½	½	1	1	6	2577
2	IM Arkadij Naiditsch (Germany)	2442	1		1	½	½	½	½	½	1	0	5½	2538
3	GM Zoltán Varga (Hungary)	2530	0	0		1	1	1	½	½	1	½	5½	2528
4	GM Arshak Petrosian (Armenia)	2476	½	½	0		½	½	1	1	½	1	5½	2534
5	GM Adrian Mikhalchishin (Slovenia)	2552	½	½	0	½		½	½	1	½	1	5	2488
6	FM Fabian Döttling (Germany)	2477	0	½	0	½	½		½	1	1	1	5	2497
7	IM Ketino Kachiani-Gersinska (Germany)	2437	½	½	½	0	½	½		½	0	1	4	2415
8	IM Almira Skripchenko-Lautier (Moldova)	2444	½	½	½	0	0	0	½		½	1	3½	2377
9	FM Olaf Wegener (Germany)	2359	0	0	0	½	½	0	1	½		0	2½	2301
10	Gregor Mainka (Germany)	2357	0	1	½	0	0	0	0	0	1		2½	2301

==== 2001 ====
29th Dortmund Sparkassen Chess Meeting (July 12 – 22, 2001)

29th Sparkassen Chess-Meeting, 12–22 July 2001, Dortmund, Germany, Category XXI (2755)
	Player	Rating	1	2	3	4	5	6	Points	TPR
1	Vladimir Kramnik (Russia)	2802		1 ½	½ ½	1 ½	½ ½	½ 1	6½	2855
2	Veselin Topalov (Bulgaria)	2711	0 ½		½ ½	1 1	½ ½	1 1	6½	2873
3	Peter Leko (Hungary)	2730	½ ½	½ ½		½ ½	1 ½	½ ½	5½	2796
4	Alexander Morozevich (Russia)	2749	0 ½	0 0	½ ½		1 1	½ 1	5	2756
5	Michael Adams (England)	2744	½ ½	½ ½	0 ½	0 0		½ ½	3½	2647
6	Viswanathan Anand (India)	2794	½ 0	0 0	½ ½	½ 0	½ ½		3	2598

(Germany) IM Arkadij Naiditsch (2524) defeated (Moldova) IM Almira Skripchenko-Lautier (2494) in Dortmund Sparkassen Match with the score 7:3.

The Dortmund Sparkassen Man-Machine Match between (Germany) GM Robert Hübner (2612) and Deep Fritz ended in a draw with the score 3:3 (all the games were drawn).

==== 2002 ====
30th Dortmund Sparkassen Chess Meeting (July 6 – 21, 2002)

===== Candidates Tournament =====
The main event was a Candidates Tournament to determine a challenger for Vladimir Kramnik's Einstein Group World Chess title.

30th Sparkassen Chess, Group 1, 6–11 July 2002, Dortmund, Cat. XIX (2701)
	Player	Rating	1	2	3	4	Points	TB	TPR
1	Alexei Shirov (Spain)	2697		½ ½	½ 1	½ 1	4	1½	2826
2	Veselin Topalov (Bulgaria)	2745	½ ½		1 ½	1 ½	4	½	2810
3	Boris Gelfand (Israel)	2710	½ 0	0 ½		1 ½	2½		2640
4	Christopher Lutz (Germany)	2650	½ 0	0 ½	0 ½		1½		2524

Group 1 first place playoff, 12 July 2002, Dortmund, Germany
Player	Rating	1	2	Points	Place	TPR
Alexei Shirov (Spain)	2697	½	1	1½	1	2938
Veselin Topalov (Bulgaria)	2745	½	0	½	2	2504

30th Sparkassen Chess, Group 2, 6–11 July 2002, Dortmund, Cat. XX (2728)
	Player	Rating	1	2	3	4	Points	TPR
1	Evgeny Bareev (Russia)	2726		1 0	½ ½	1 1	4	2853
2	Peter Leko (Hungary)	2717	0 1		½ 1	½ ½	3½	2788
3	Michael Adams (England)	2752	½ ½	½ 0		½ ½	2½	2662
4	Alexander Morozevich (Russia)	2716	0 0	½ ½	½ ½		2	2606

Semifinals
Alexei Shirov (Spain)	½
Peter Leko (Hungary)	2½
Veselin Topalov (Bulgaria)	3½
Evgeny Bareev (Russia)	2½

Final
Peter Leko (Hungary)	2½
Veselin Topalov (Bulgaria)	1½

===== Side events =====
(Armenia) IM Tigran Nalbandian (2458) won Dortmund Open Swiss-system tournament with the score 9/11.

The match between (Germany) GM Arkadij Naiditsch (2581) and (Netherlands) GM Jan Timman (2623) ended in a draw with the score 4:4.

(Germany) David Baramidze (2351) defeated (Federal Republic of Yugoslavia) IM Alisa Marić (2470) in Dortmund Sparkassen Match with the score 4½:3½.

==== 2003 ====
31st Dortmund Sparkassen Chess Meeting (July 31 – August 10, 2003)

(Moldova) GM Victor Bologan qualified as the winner of Aeroflot Open 2003.

31st Sparkassen Chess-Meeting, 31 July – 10 August 2003, Dortmund, Category XVIII (2695)
	Player	Rating	1	2	3	4	5	6	Points	TPR
1	Victor Bologan (Moldova)	2650		½ ½	1 0	½ ½	1 ½	1 1	6½	2814
2	Vladimir Kramnik (Russia)	2785	½ ½		½ ½	1 ½	½ ½	½ ½	5½	2713
3	Viswanathan Anand (India)	2774	0 1	½ ½		0 ½	½ 1	1 ½	5½	2715
4	Teimour Radjabov (Azerbaijan)	2648	½ ½	0 ½	1 ½		½ ½	0 1	5	2704
5	Peter Leko (Hungary)	2739	0 ½	½ ½	½ 0	½ ½		½ ½	4	2614
6	Arkadij Naiditsch (Germany)	2574	0 0	½ ½	0 ½	1 0	½ ½		3½	2609

(Germany) IM Yuri Boidman (2407) won Dortmund Open A Swiss-system tournament with the score 8/9 and performance rating 2616.

(Russia) GM Vladimir Belikov (2499) defeated (Germany) IM David Baramidze (2470) in Dortmund Match with the score 6:4.

==== 2004 ====
32nd Dortmund Sparkassen Chess Meeting (July 22 – August 1, 2004)

(Russia) GM Sergei Rublevsky qualified as the winner of Aeroflot Open 2004.

===== Preliminaries =====
32nd Sparkassen Chess, Group A, 22–27 July 2004, Dortmund, Cat. XVIII (2692)
	Player	Rating	1	2	3	4	Points	TPR
1	Viswanathan Anand (India)	2782		1 ½	½ ½	½ 1	4	2787
2	Peter Svidler (Russia)	2727	0 ½		1 1	½ ½	3½	2737
3	Arkadij Naiditsch (Germany)	2574	½ ½	0 0		½ 1	2½	2674
4	Sergei Rublevsky (Russia)	2686	½ 0	½ ½	½ 0		2	2569

32nd Sparkassen Chess, Group B, 22–27 July 2004, Dortmund, Cat. XVIII (2691)
	Player	Rating	1	2	3	4	Points	TB	TPR
1	Vladimir Kramnik (Russia)	2770		½ ½	½ ½	½ ½	3	4	2665
2	Peter Leko (Hungary)	2741	½ ½		½ ½	½ ½	3	3½	2674
3	Victor Bologan (Moldova)	2663	½ ½	½ ½		½ ½	3	2½	2700
4	Sergey Karjakin (Ukraine)	2591	½ ½	½ ½	½ ½		3	2	2724

Group B Rapid playoff, 27 July 2004, Dortmund, Cat. XVIII (2691)
	Player	Rating	1	2	3	4	Points	TPR
1	Vladimir Kramnik (Russia)	2770		½ ½	1 1	1 0	4	2790
2	Peter Leko (Hungary)	2741	½ ½		½ ½	1 ½	3½	2731
3	Victor Bologan (Moldova)	2663	0 0	½ ½		1 ½	2½	2643
4	Sergey Karjakin (Ukraine)	2591	0 1	0 ½	0 ½		2	2599

===== Knockout =====
Semifinals
1A	Viswanathan Anand (India)	4
2B	Peter Leko (Hungary)	2
2A	Peter Svidler (Russia)	3
1B	Vladimir Kramnik (Russia)	5

Final
1A	Viswanathan Anand (India)	2½
1B	Vladimir Kramnik (Russia)	1½
Third place
2B	Peter Leko (Hungary)	1½
2A	Peter Svidler (Russia)	2½

Playoffs 5th-8th
3A	Arkadij Naiditsch (Germany)	2
4B	Sergey Karjakin (Ukraine)	0
4A	Sergei Rublevsky (Russia)	3
3B	Victor Bologan (Moldova)	1

Playoffs 5th-6th
3A	Arkadij Naiditsch (Germany)	1½
4A	Sergei Rublevsky (Russia)	½
Playoffs 7th-8th
4B	Sergey Karjakin (Ukraine)	½
3B	Victor Bologan (Moldova)	1½

Final standings
Place	Player	Rating
1	Viswanathan Anand (India)	2782
2	Vladimir Kramnik (Russia)	2770
3	Peter Svidler (Russia)	2727
4	Peter Leko (Hungary)	2741
5	Arkadij Naiditsch (Germany)	2574
6	Sergei Rublevsky (Russia)	2686
7	Victor Bologan (Moldova)	2663
8	Sergey Karjakin (Ukraine)	2591

==== 2005 ====
33rd Dortmund Sparkassen Chess Meeting (July 8 – 17, 2005)

(Israel) GM Emil Sutovsky qualified as the winner of Aeroflot Open 2005.

33rd Sparkassen Chess-Meeting, 8–17 July 2005, Dortmund, Germany, Category XIX (2709)
	Player	Rating	1	2	3	4	5	6	7	8	9	10	Points	TPR
1	Arkadij Naiditsch (Germany)	2612		0	½	½	½	½	½	1	1	1	5½	2800
2	Veselin Topalov (Bulgaria)	2788	1		½	½	1	0	0	1	½	½	5	2743
3	Étienne Bacrot (France)	2729	½	½		½	0	1	1	½	1	0	5	2750
4	Peter Svidler (Russia)	2738	½	½	½		½	½	½	1	½	½	5	2749
5	Loek van Wely (Netherlands)	2655	½	0	1	½		½	1	0	1	½	5	2758
6	Vladimir Kramnik (Russia)	2744	½	1	0	½	½		½	½	0	1	4½	2705
7	Michael Adams (England)	2719	½	1	0	½	0	½		½	½	1	4½	2708
8	Peter Leko (Hungary)	2763	0	0	½	0	1	½	½		½	1	4	2660
9	Emil Sutovsky (Israel)	2674	0	½	0	½	0	1	½	½		½	3½	2633
10	Peter Heine Nielsen (Denmark)	2668	0	½	1	½	½	0	0	0	½		3	2589

==== 2006 ====
34th Dortmund Sparkassen Chess Meeting (July 29 – August 6, 2006)

(Georgia (country)) GM Baadur Jobava qualified as the winner of Aeroflot Open 2006.

34th Sparkassen Chess-Meeting, 29 July – 6 August 2006, Dortmund, Category XIX (2720)
	Player	Rating	1	2	3	4	5	6	7	8	Points	SB	TPR
1	Vladimir Kramnik (Russia)	2743		½	½	1	½	½	½	1	4½	14.50	2819
2	Peter Svidler (Russia)	2742	½		½	½	½	½	1	1	4½	13.50	2819
3	Michael Adams (England)	2732	½	½		½	1	½	½	½	4	14.00	2768
4	Peter Leko (Hungary)	2738	0	½	½		½	1	1	½	4	12.50	2768
5	Boris Gelfand (Israel)	2729	½	½	0	½		½	1	1	4	11.75	2769
6	Arkadij Naiditsch (Germany)	2665	½	½	½	0	½		½	1	3½	11.00	2728
7	Levon Aronian (Armenia)	2761	½	0	½	0	0	½		½	2½	6.75	2612
8	Baadur Jobava (Georgia)	2651	0	0	½	½	0	0	½		2	5.00	2572

==== 2007 ====
35th Dortmund Sparkassen Chess Meeting (June 23 – July 1, 2007)

(Russia) GM Evgeny Alekseev qualified as the winner of Aeroflot Open 2007.

35th Sparkassen Chess-Meeting, 23 June – 1 July 2007, Dortmund, Category XX (2727)
	Player	Rating	1	2	3	4	5	6	7	8	Points	TPR
1	Vladimir Kramnik (Russia)	2772		½	½	½	½	1	1	1	5	2878
2	Evgeny Alekseev (Russia)	2679	½		½	½	1	½	½	½	4	2783
3	Peter Leko (Hungary)	2738	½	½		½	½	½	1	½	4	2775
4	Viswanathan Anand (India)	2786	½	½	½		½	½	½	1	4	2768
5	Shakhriyar Mamedyarov (Azerbaijan)	2757	½	0	½	½		½	½	1	3½	2722
6	Magnus Carlsen (Norway)	2693	0	½	½	½	½		½	½	3	2681
7	Boris Gelfand (Israel)	2733	0	½	0	½	½	½		½	2½	2624
8	Arkadij Naiditsch (Germany)	2654	0	½	½	0	0	½	½		2	2579

==== 2008 ====
36th Dortmund Sparkassen Chess Meeting (June 28 – July 6, 2008)

(Russia) GM Ian Nepomniachtchi qualified as the winner of Aeroflot Open 2008.

36th Sparkassen Chess-Meeting, 28 June – 6 July 2008, Dortmund, Category XVIII (2694)
	Player	Rating	1	2	3	4	5	6	7	8	Points	TPR
1	Peter Leko (Hungary)	2741		1	½	½	1	½	½	½	4½	2790
2	Vassily Ivanchuk (Ukraine)	2740	0		½	½	½	1	1	½	4	2738
3	Shakhriyar Mamedyarov (Azerbaijan)	2752	½	½		½	½	½	½	1	4	2736
4	Ian Nepomniachtchi (Russia)	2634	½	½	½		½	½	½	1	4	2753
5	Jan Gustafsson (Germany)	2603	0	½	½	½		1	½	1	4	2758
6	Arkadij Naiditsch (Germany)	2624	½	0	½	½	0		1	1	3½	2705
7	Vladimir Kramnik (Russia)	2788	½	0	½	½	½	0		1	3	2631
8	Loek van Wely (Netherlands)	2677	½	½	0	0	0	0	0		1	2388

==== 2009 ====
37th Dortmund Sparkassen Chess Meeting (July 2 – 12, 2009)

(France) GM Étienne Bacrot qualified as the winner of Aeroflot Open 2009.

37th Sparkassen Chess-Meeting, 2–12 July 2009, Dortmund, Germany, Category XX (2744)
	Player	Rating	1	2	3	4	5	6	Points	TPR
1	Vladimir Kramnik (Russia)	2759		½ ½	½ 1	½ ½	½ ½	1 1	6½	2851
2	Peter Leko (Hungary)	2756	½ ½		½ ½	½ ½	1 ½	½ ½	5½	2778
3	Magnus Carlsen (Norway)	2772	½ 0	½ ½		1 ½	½ ½	1 ½	5½	2775
4	Dmitry Jakovenko (Russia)	2760	½ ½	½ ½	0 ½		½ 1	1 ½	5½	2777
5	Étienne Bacrot (France)	2721	½ ½	0 ½	½ ½	½ 0		½ ½	4	2677
6	Arkadij Naiditsch (Germany)	2697	0 0	½ ½	0 ½	0 ½	½ ½		3	2605

=== 2010s ===
==== 2010 ====
38th Dortmund Sparkassen Chess Meeting (July 15–25, 2010)

(Vietnam) GM Lê Quang Liêm qualified as the winner of Aeroflot Open 2010.

38th Sparkassen Chess-Meeting, 15–25 July 2010, Dortmund, Germany, Category XX (2731)
	Player	Rating	1	2	3	4	5	6	Points	SB	TPR
1	Ruslan Ponomariov (Ukraine)	2734		0 ½	1 ½	1 ½	½ 1	1 ½	6½		2840
2	Lê Quang Liêm (Vietnam)	2681	1 ½		½ ½	0 ½	½ ½	1 ½	5½		2777
3	Vladimir Kramnik (Russia)	2790	0 ½	½ ½		½ 1	1 0	½ ½	5	24.25	2719
4	Shakhriyar Mamedyarov (Azerbaijan)	2761	0 ½	1 ½	½ 0		1 0	½ 1	5	24.00	2725
5	Arkadij Naiditsch (Germany)	2684	½ 0	½ ½	0 1	0 1		½ 0	4	20.75	2668
6	Peter Leko (Hungary)	2734	0 ½	0 ½	½ ½	½ 0	½ 1		4	19.50	2658

==== 2011 ====
39th Dortmund Sparkassen Chess Meeting (July 21 – 31, 2011)

(Vietnam) GM Lê Quang Liêm qualified as the winner of Aeroflot Open 2011.

39th Sparkassen Chess-Meeting, 21–31 July 2011, Dortmund, Germany, Category XX (2731)
	Player	Rating	1	2	3	4	5	6	Points	SB	Wins	TPR
1	Vladimir Kramnik (Russia)	2781		½ ½	1 ½	1 ½	1 0	1 1	7	31.00	5	2870
2	Lê Quang Liêm (Vietnam)	2715	½ ½		1 ½	½ ½	½ ½	½ ½	5½	27.00	1	2770
3	Ruslan Ponomariov (Ukraine)	2764	0 ½	0 ½		1 0	1 1	½ ½	5	23.25	3	2761
4	Anish Giri (Netherlands)	2701	0 ½	½ ½	0 1		½ ½	1 ½	5	23.00	2	2737
5	Hikaru Nakamura (United States)	2770	0 1	½ ½	0 0	½ ½		½ 1	4½	22.00	2	2687
6	Georg Meier (Germany)	2656	0 0	½ ½	½ ½	0 ½	½ 0		3	15.25	0	2597

==== 2012 ====
40th Dortmund Sparkassen Chess Meeting (July 13 – 22, 2012)

(Poland) GM Mateusz Bartel qualified as the winner of Aeroflot Open 2012.

40th Sparkassen Chess-Meeting, 13–22 July 2012, Dortmund, Germany, Category XIX (2711)
	Player	Rating	1	2	3	4	5	6	7	8	9	10	Points	Black	Wins	SB	TPR
1	Fabiano Caruana (Italy)	2775		½	0	1	½	½	½	1	1	1	6	4	4	23.00	2829
2	Sergey Karjakin (Russia)	2779	½		½	½	½	½	½	1	1	1	6	4	3	23.00	2829
3	Ruslan Ponomariov (Ukraine)	2726	1	½		½	½	½	1	½	0	1	5½	5	3	24.50	2789
4	Vladimir Kramnik (Russia)	2799	0	½	½		½	½	1	½	1	1	5	5	3	20.50	2744
5	Arkadij Naiditsch (Germany)	2700	½	½	½	½		½	½	½	1	1	5	5	2	21.50	2755
6	Peter Leko (Hungary)	2730	½	½	½	½	½		½	½	1	1	5	4	2	21.50	2752
7	Georg Meier (Germany)	2644	½	½	0	0	½	½		½	1	½	4	4	1	16.00	2676
8	Daniel Fridman (Germany)	2655	0	0	½	½	½	½	½		½	½	3½	4	0	14.75	2637
9	Mateusz Bartel (Poland)	2674	0	0	1	0	0	0	0	½		½	2	5	1	8.00	2495
10	Jan Gustafsson (Germany)	2629	0	0	0	0	0	0	½	½	½		1½	5	0	4.75	2447

==== 2013 ====
41st Dortmund Sparkassen Chess Meeting (July 26 – August 4, 2013)

41st Sparkassen Chess-Meeting, 26 July – 4 August 2013, Dortmund, Category XIX (2709)
	Player	Rating	1	2	3	4	5	6	7	8	9	10	Points	Wins	TPR
1	Michael Adams (England)	2740		½	½	1	1	½	1	1	1	½	7	5	2925
2	Vladimir Kramnik (Russia)	2784	½		1	½	0	1	1	1	½	1	6½	5	2866
3	Peter Leko (Hungary)	2737	½	0		1	½	½	½	½	½	½	4½	1	2705
4	Arkadij Naiditsch (Germany)	2710	0	½	0		1	0	½	1	1	½	4½	3	2708
5	Dmitry Andreikin (Russia)	2727	0	1	½	0		½	0	½	1	½	4	2	2664
6	Georg Meier (Germany)	2610	½	0	½	1	½		½	0	½	½	4	1	2677
7	Fabiano Caruana (Italy)	2796	0	0	½	½	1	½		0	½	1	4	2	2656
8	Wang Hao (China)	2752	0	0	½	0	½	1	1		0	1	4	3	2661
9	Igor Khenkin (Germany)	2605	0	½	½	0	0	½	½	1		½	3½	1	2640
10	Daniel Fridman (Germany)	2629	½	0	½	½	½	½	0	0	½		3	0	2592

==== 2014 ====
42nd Dortmund Sparkassen Chess Meeting (July 12 – 20, 2014)

The 42nd Dortmund Sparkassen Chess Meeting took place between July 12 and July 20, 2014, in the "Orchesterzentrum NRW" in Dortmund, Germany. The eight-player round-robin tournament consisted of 7 games of Classical Chess. The field was led by Vladimir Kramnik, Fabiano Caruana, and Michael Adams. Players received 100 minutes for 40 moves, then an additional 50 minutes for 20 additional moves, and finally 15 minutes for the rest of the game plus 30 seconds per move starting from move one.

42nd Sparkassen Chess-Meeting, 12–20 July 2014, Dortmund, Germany, Category XIX (2715)
	Player	Rating	1	2	3	4	5	6	7	8	Points	Wins	TPR
1	Fabiano Caruana (Italy)	2789		½	1	½	1	1	½	1	5½	5	2934
2	Peter Leko (Hungary)	2737	½		½	1	½	½	½	½	4	3	2762
3	Georg Meier (Germany)	2632	0	½		1	½	½	1	½	4	2	2777
4	Arkadij Naiditsch (Germany)	2705	½	0	0		½	1	½	1	3½	3	2716
5	Michael Adams (England)	2743	0	½	½	½		½	½	1	3½	1	2711
6	Ruslan Ponomariov (Ukraine)	2723	0	½	½	0	½		1	½	3	1	2664
7	Vladimir Kramnik (Russia)	2777	½	½	0	½	½	0		½	2½	0	2604
8	David Baramidze (Germany)	2616	0	½	½	0	0	½	½		2	0	2571

==== 2015 ====
43rd Dortmund Sparkassen Chess Meeting (June 27 – July 5, 2015)

The 43rd Dortmund Sparkassen Chess Meeting took place between June 27 to July 5 in the "Orchesterzentrum NRW" in Dortmund, Germany. The eight-player round-robin tournament consisted of 7 games of Classical Chess. The field was led by Vladimir Kramnik, Fabiano Caruana, and Wesley So. Players received 100 minutes for 40 moves, then an additional 50 minutes for 20 additional moves, and finally 15 minutes for the rest of the game plus 30 seconds per move starting from move one.

The tournament was also the final Dortmund appearance for Arkadij Naiditsch before his transfer to the Azerbaijan Chess Federation.

(Russia) GM Ian Nepomniachtchi qualified as the winner of Aeroflot Open 2015.

43rd Sparkassen Chess-Meeting, 27 June – 5 July 2015, Dortmund, Category XIX (2724)
	Player	Rating	1	2	3	4	5	6	7	8	Points	Black	TPR
1	Fabiano Caruana (United States)	2805		0	1	1	1	½	1	1	5½		2942
2	Wesley So (United States)	2778	1		0	1	0	1	½	½	4	4	2766
3	Liviu-Dieter Nisipeanu (Germany)	2654	0	1		½	1	½	½	½	4	3	2784
4	Vladimir Kramnik (Russia)	2783	0	0	½		0	1	1	1	3½		2715
5	Arkadij Naiditsch (Germany)	2722	0	1	0	1		0	½	½	3	4	2674
6	Ian Nepomniachtchi (Russia)	2720	½	0	½	0	1		½	½	3	3	2674
7	Hou Yifan (China)	2676	0	½	½	0	½	½		½	2½	4	2628
8	Georg Meier (Germany)	2654	0	½	½	0	½	½	½		2½	3	2632

==== 2016 ====
44th Dortmund Sparkassen Chess Meeting (July 9 – 17, 2016)

The 44th Dortmund Sparkassen Chess Meeting took place between July 9 to 17 in the "Orchesterzentrum NRW" in Dortmund, Germany. The eight-player round-robin tournament consisted of 7 games of Classical Chess. The field was led by Vladimir Kramnik, Fabiano Caruana, and Maxime Vachier-Lagrave. Players received 100 minutes for 40 moves, then 50 minutes for 20 additional moves, then 15 minutes for the rest of the game plus 30 seconds per move starting from move one.

(Russia) GM Evgeniy Najer qualified as the winner of Aeroflot Open 2016.

Maxime Vachier-Lagrave won the tournament on July 16 with 1 game to spare. This was his first Dortmund tournament victory.

44th Sparkassen Chess-Meeting, 9–17 July 2016, Dortmund, Germany, Category XX (2732)
	Player	Rating	1	2	3	4	5	6	7	8	Points	Black	Wins	TPR
1	Maxime Vachier-Lagrave (France)	2798		½	1	½	1	½	1	1	5½			2954
2	Vladimir Kramnik (Russia)	2812	½		½	½	½	½	1	½	4	4		2771
3	Fabiano Caruana (United States)	2810	0	½		½	½	½	1	1	4	3	2	2771
4	Leinier Domínguez (Cuba)	2713	½	½	½		1	½	½	½	4	3	1	2786
5	Ruslan Ponomariov (Ukraine)	2706	0	½	½	0		½	1	1	3½	4		2735
6	Liviu-Dieter Nisipeanu (Germany)	2674	½	½	½	½	½		½	½	3½	3		2740
7	Evgeniy Najer (Russia)	2687	0	0	0	½	0	½		1	2			2574
8	Rainer Buhmann (Germany)	2653	0	½	0	½	0	½	0		1½			2512

==== 2017 ====
45th Dortmund Sparkassen Chess Meeting (July 15 – 23, 2017)

(Russia) GM Vladimir Fedoseev qualified as the winner of Aeroflot Open 2017.

45th Sparkassen Chess-Meeting, 15–23 July 2017, Dortmund, Germany, Category XIX (2725)
	Player	Rating	1	2	3	4	5	6	7	8	Points	Black	Wins	SB	TPR
1	Radosław Wojtaszek (Poland)	2736		½	½	½	½	½	1	1	4½	4	2	14.75	2826
2	Vladimir Fedoseev (Russia)	2726	½		½	1	0	½	1	½	4	4	2	13.75	2775
3	Maxime Vachier-Lagrave (France)	2791	½	½		½	½	1	½	½	4	3	1	13.50	2766
4	Vladimir Kramnik (Russia)	2812	½	0	½		1	½	½	½	3½	3	1	11.75	2713
5	Matthias Blübaum (Germany)	2642	½	1	½	0		½	0	½	3	4	1	11.25	2687
6	Dmitry Andreikin (Russia)	2712	½	½	0	½	½		½	½	3	4	0	10.50	2677
7	Wang Yue (China)	2699	0	0	½	½	1	½		½	3	3	1	9.75	2679
8	Liviu-Dieter Nisipeanu (Germany)	2683	0	½	½	½	½	½	½		3	3	0	10.25	2681

==== 2018 ====
46th Dortmund Sparkassen Chess Meeting (July 14 – 22, 2018)

(Belarus) GM Vladislav Kovalev qualified as the winner of Aeroflot Open 2018.

46th Sparkassen Chess-Meeting, 14–22 July 2018, Dortmund, Germany, Category XIX (2720)
	Player	Rating	1	2	3	4	5	6	7	8	Points	Black	Wins	SB	TPR
1	Ian Nepomniachtchi (Russia)	2757		½	½	½	1	1	½	1	5	3	3	15.50	2873
2	Anish Giri (Netherlands)	2782	½		0	½	½	1	½	1	4	4	2	12.25	2761
3	Vladislav Kovalev (Belarus)	2655	½	1		½	½	½	½	½	4	4	1	14.00	2778
4	Jan-Krzysztof Duda (Poland)	2737	½	½	½		½	0	1	1	4	3	2	12.75	2776
5	Georg Meier (Germany)	2638	0	½	½	½		½	½	1	3½	4	1	10.50	2732
6	Vladimir Kramnik (Russia)	2792	0	0	½	1	½		½	½	3	3	1	10.00	2668
7	Radosław Wojtaszek (Poland)	2733	½	½	½	0	½	½		½	3	3	0	10.50	2660
8	Liviu-Dieter Nisipeanu (Germany)	2672	0	0	½	0	0	½	½		1½	4	0	5.00	2501

==== 2019 ====
47th Dortmund Sparkassen Chess Meeting (July 13 – 21, 2019)

(Estonia) GM Kaido Külaots qualified as the winner of Aeroflot Open 2019.

47th Sparkassen Chess-Meeting, 13–21 July 2019, Dortmund, Germany, Category XIX (2705)
	Player	Rating	1	2	3	4	5	6	7	8	Points	Black	Wins	SB	TPR
1	Leinier Domínguez (United States)	2760		1	½	½	½	1	½	½	4½				2798
2	Ian Nepomniachtchi (Russia)	2775	0		½	0	½	1	1	1	4	4	3		2744
3	Radosław Wojtaszek (Poland)	2737	½	½		½	½	½	½	1	4	4	1		2749
4	Richárd Rapport (Hungary)	2735	½	1	½		½	½	½	½	4	3	1	14.00	2750
5	Teimour Radjabov (Azerbaijan)	2759	½	½	½	½		1	½	½	4	3	1	13.25	2746
6	Liviu-Dieter Nisipeanu (Germany)	2667	0	0	½	½	0		½	1	2½	4	1		2607
7	Kaido Külaots (Estonia)	2574	½	0	½	½	½	½		0	2½	4	0		2623
8	Daniel Fridman (Germany)	2644	½	0	0	½	½	0	1		2½	3			2612

(Germany) FM Thomas Michalczak (2239) won Sparkassen Chess Meeting Open A swiss-system tournament with the score 7½/9 and performance rating 2533.

=== 2020s ===
==== 2024 ====
The 2024 edition featured a 6-games standard rules match between the top 2 German women, GM Elisabeth Pähtz versus IM Dinara Wagner, alongside open tournaments. The Open A tournament was included in the 2024 FIDE Circuit.

2024 Sparkassen Chess Meeting, Pähtz vs Wagner, 11–18 August
Player	Rating	1	2	3	4	5	6	Total
(Germany) Elisabeth Pähtz	2465	½	½	½	½	½	½	3
(Germany) Dinara Wagner	2455	½	½	½	½	½	½	3

2024 Sparkassen Chess Meeting Open A, 10–18 August
	Player	Rating	Points	TB	Circuit
1	Nico Zwirs (Netherlands)	2467	7½/9	48	9.12
2	Anton Korobov (Ukraine)	2648	7/9	51	5.59
3	Frederik Svane (Germany)	2636	7/9	49½	5.18
4	David Gavrilescu (Romania)	2534	7/9	49	4.77
5	Yahli Sokolovsky (Israel)	2522	7/9	46½	4.35
6	Evgeny Romanov (North Macedonia)	2567	7/9	43	3.94
7	Andrey Sumets (Ukraine)	2507	7/9	41½	3.52
8	Luis Ernesto Quesada Perez (Cuba)	2576	6½/9	48½	0.97
9	Enis Zuferi (Germany)	2394	6½/9	45½	0.14
10	Gerlef Meins (Germany)	2384	6½/9	44	0.14
11	Frederick Waldhausen Gordon (Scotland)	2342	6½/9	43½	0.14
12	Jonas Gallasch (Germany)	2260	6½/9	42	0.14
13	Romuald Mainka (Germany)	2370	6½/9	38	0.14
Total entries: 193 players

==== 2025 ====
The 2025 edition featured a standard double round-robin tournament between 4 female players, GM Elisabeth Pähtz, IM Dinara Wagner, IM Deimantė Cornette & IM Lu Miaoyi alongside open tournaments. The Open A tournament was included in the 2025 FIDE Circuit.

2025 Sparkassen Chess Meeting, 3–10 August
	Player	Rating	1	2	3	4	Total
1	(China) IM Lu Miaoyi	2439		1 ½	0 1	1 1	4½
2	(Germany) GM Elisabeth Pähtz	2406	0 ½		½ 1	½ ½	3
3	(Germany) IM Dinara Wagner	2404	1 0	½ 0		1 0	2½
4	(France) IM Deimantė Cornette	2401	0 0	½ ½	0 1		2

2025 Sparkassen Chess Meeting Open A, 2–10 August
	Player	Rating	Points	TB	Circuit
1	Matthias Blübaum (Germany)	2660	7/9	50	6.89
2	Surya Shekhar Ganguly (India)	2566	7/9	49	6.06
3	Dau Khuong Duy (Vietnam)	2462	7/9	46½	5.65
4	Dmitrij Kollars (Germany)	2644	7/9	46½	5.23
5	Liu Yan (China)	2531	7/9	44	4.82
6	Jan Malek (Poland)	2526	7/9	44	4.41
7	Luis Engel (Germany)	2548	6½/9	51	1.47
8	Rinat Jumabayev (Kazakhstan)	2556	6½/9	48½	1.06
9	Xiao Tong (China)	2539	6½/9	47	0.23
10	Jan Klimkowski (Poland)	2517	6½/9	46½	0.23
11	David Gavrilescu (Romania)	2531	6½/9	45½	0.23
12	Ebrahim Ahmadinia (Iran)	2388	6½/9	45	0.23
13	Christian Gloeckler (Germany)	2446	6½/9	42½	0.23
14	Konstantin Peyrer (Austria)	2490	6½/9	42	0.23
15	Marco Materia (France)	2500	6½/9	40	0.23
Total entries: 196 players

==== 2026 ====
The 2026 edition featured a standard double round-robin tournament between 4 female players, IM Song Yuxin, IM Dinara Wagner, IM Klaudia Kulon & IM Nataliya Buksa alongside open tournaments. The Open A tournament was included in the 2026–2027 FIDE Circuit.

2026 Sparkassen Chess Meeting, 2–9 August
	Player	Rating	1	2	3	4	Total
1	(China) IM Song Yuxin	2452		1 1	½ ½	0 1	4
2	(Poland) IM Klaudia Kulon	2395	0 0		½ 1	½ 1	3
3	(Germany) IM Dinara Wagner	2403	½ ½	½ 0		1 0	2½
3	(Ukraine) IM Nataliya Buksa	2393	1 0	½ 0	0 1		2½

2026 Sparkassen Chess Meeting Open A, 1–9 August
	Player	Rating	Points	TB	Circuit
1	Elham Amar (Norway)	2587	7½/9	48½	7.44
2	Amilal Munkhdalai (Mongolia)	2481	7/9	48	4.74
3	Kacper Piorun (Poland)	2519	7/9	47	4.40
4	Surya Shekhar Ganguly (India)	2556	7/9	46½	4.06
5	Dmitrij Kollars (Germany)	2627	7/9	44	3.72
6	Péter Ács (Hungary)	2558	7/9	43	3.38
7	Matthias Blübaum (Germany)	2689	6½/9	49½	1.23
8	Poh Yu Tian (Malaysia)	2473	6½/9	48½	0.89
9	Felix Xie (New Zealand)	2384	6½/9	47½	0.21
10	Aksel Bu Kvaløy (Norway)	2498	6½/9	44½	0.21
11	Sumiya Chinguun (Mongolia)	2389	6½/9	43	0.21
12	Chen Qi B (China)	2430	6½/9	42½	0.21
13	Rasmus Svane (Germany)	2618	6½/9	42	0.21
14	Edward Song (United States)	2379	6½/9	41½	0.21
Total entries: 208 players

== Source ==
- Winners list and Reports since 1973 by Gerhard Hund (German)
