= Elham Amar =

Norwegian chess grandmaster (born 2005)

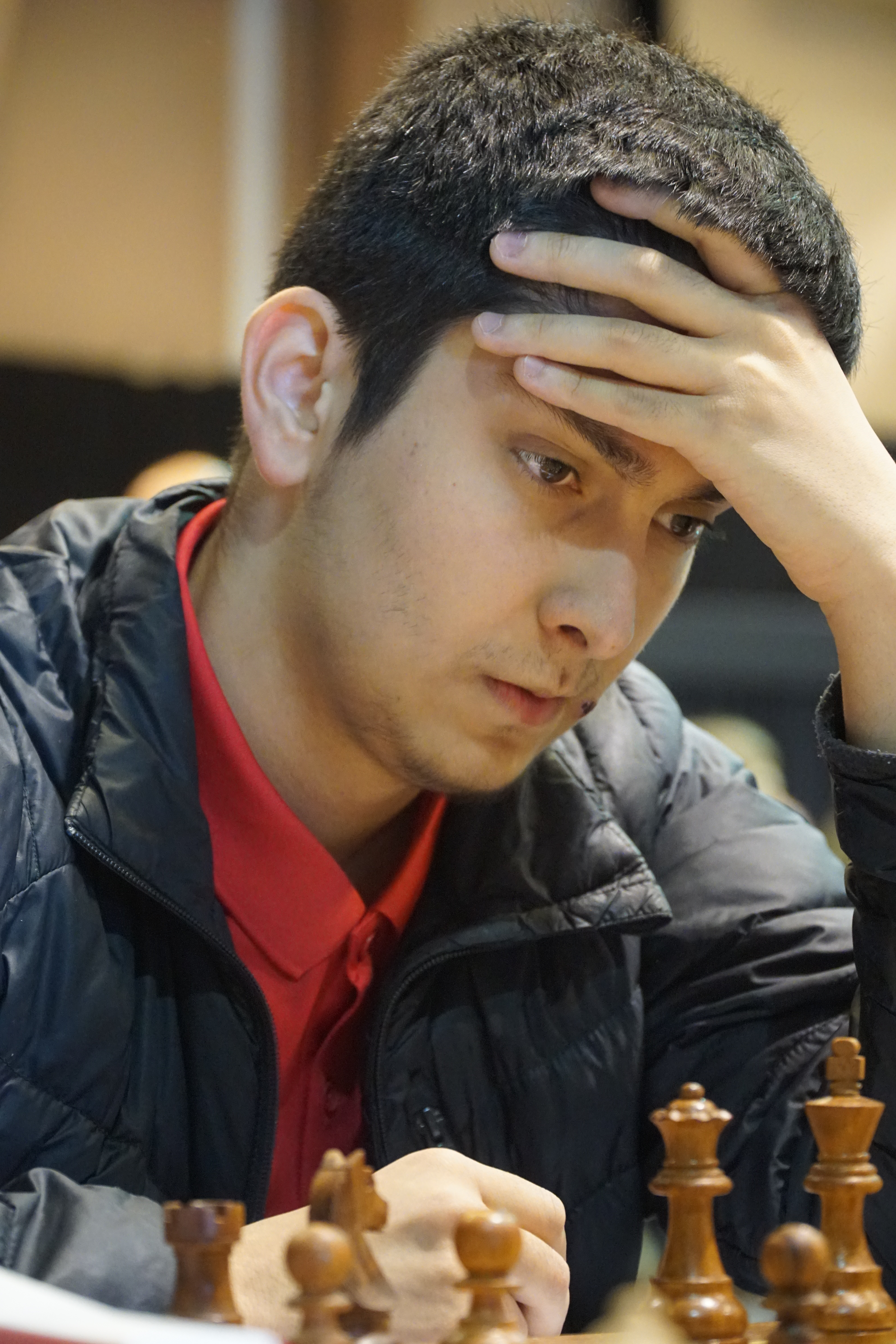
- Amar during the 2024 Norwegian Chess Championship

Personal information
- Born: 2 January 2005 (age 21)

Chess career
- Country: Norway
- Title: Grandmaster (2024)
- FIDE rating: 2587 (August 2026)
- Peak rating: 2600 (July 2025)

Elham Amar (also Elham Abdrlauf; born 2 January 2005) is a Norwegian chess grandmaster.

== Chess career ==
In January 2020, Elham ranked 2nd in international chess round-robin tournament in Stockholm.

In February 2020, he won the silver medal at the Nordic Youth Chess Championship in Class C.

In 2022, he was awarded the FIDE International Master (IM) title.

In July 2023, Elham won the bronze medal at the Norwegian Chess Championship (tournament won grandmaster Simen Agdestein).

In August 2023, he won the Riga Technical University Open "A" tournament.

In August 2026, he won Dortmund Sparkassen Chess Trophy (Open A category).
