= Yair Parkhov =

Israeli chess grandmaster (born 2002)

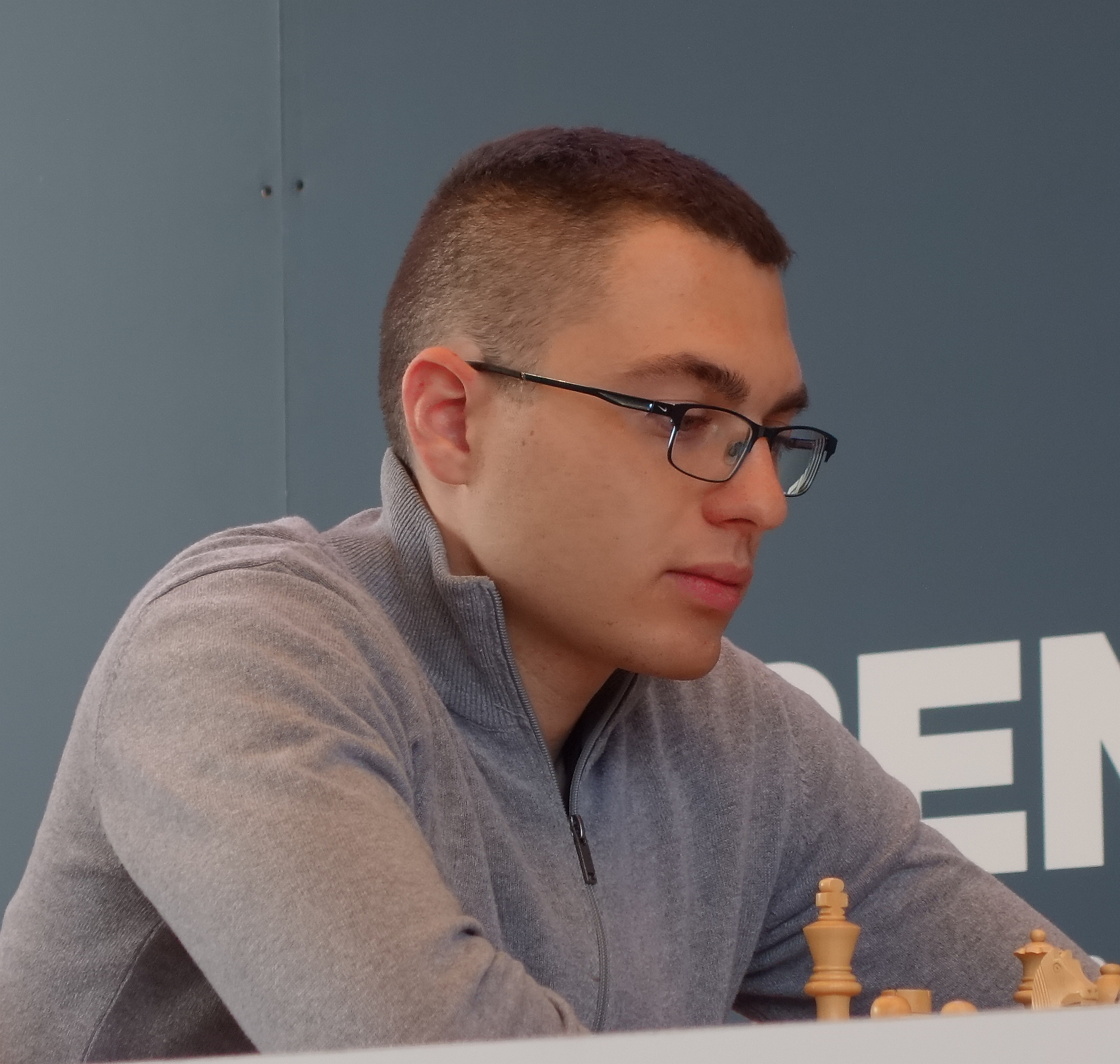
- Parkhov in 2024

Personal information
- Native name: יאיר פרחוב
- Born: November 24, 2002 (age 23)

Chess career
- Country: Israel
- Title: Grandmaster (2024)
- FIDE rating: 2439 (July 2026)
- Peak rating: 2531 (June 2024)

Yair Parkhov (Hebrew: יאיר פרחוב) is an Israeli chess grandmaster.

== Chess career ==
In June 2019, he won the Israel Junior Chess Championship.

In December 2021, he tied for second place with Evgeny Postny and Marsel Efroimski in the Israeli Chess Championship, but was ultimately ranked in 4th place after tiebreaks.

In April 2024, he was officially awarded the GM title after becoming the tournament leader in round 5 of the Sardinia World Chess Festival. He kept his lead after the next round, but ultimately finished in 7th place after losing his game in the final round.

In January 2025, he won the Israeli Chess Championship, finishing a half-point ahead of runner-up Yahli Sokolovsky.

== Personal life ==
He is studying data science at the University of Texas at Dallas.
