= Nico Zwirs =

Dutch chess player (born 1994)

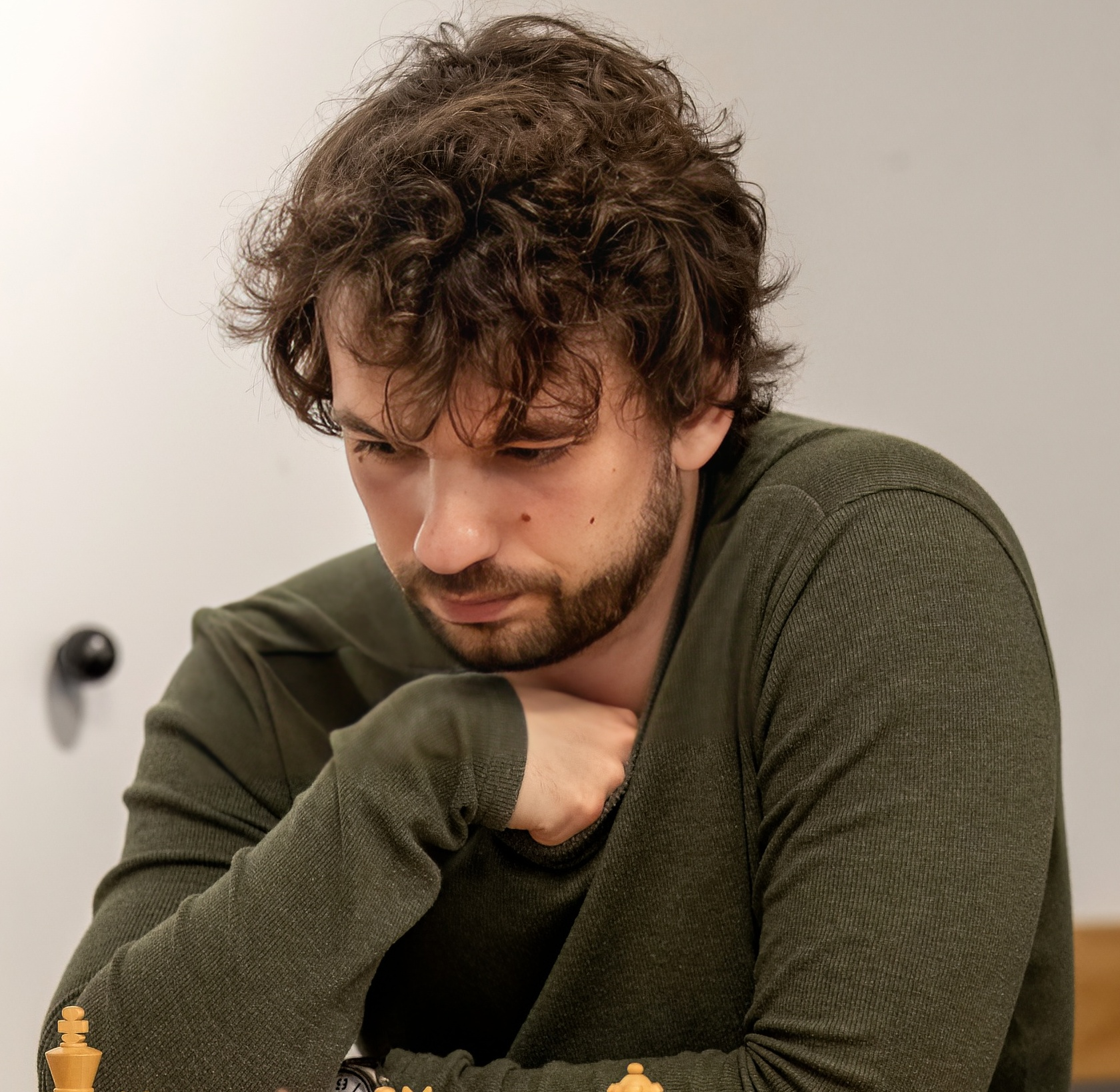
- Zwirs in 2023

Personal information
- Born: December 12, 1994 (age 31) Apeldoorn, Netherlands

Chess career
- Country: Netherlands
- Title: International Master (2019)
- FIDE rating: 2435 (July 2026)
- Peak rating: 2494 (May 2024)

Nico Zwirs is a Dutch chess player.

== Chess career ==
In March 2017, he played for the Apeldoorn Apes in the 2017 PRO Chess League season, where he won the award for best U2400 player.

In February 2022, he was a joint winner of the Cappelle-la-Grande Open.

In August 2024, he won the Dortmund Sparkassen Chess Meeting after defeating grandmaster Christopher Yoo in the final round, ending with a score of 7.5/9.
