= FIDE World Chess Championship 2004 =

Chess championship in Tripoli, Libya

World Chess Championship 2004
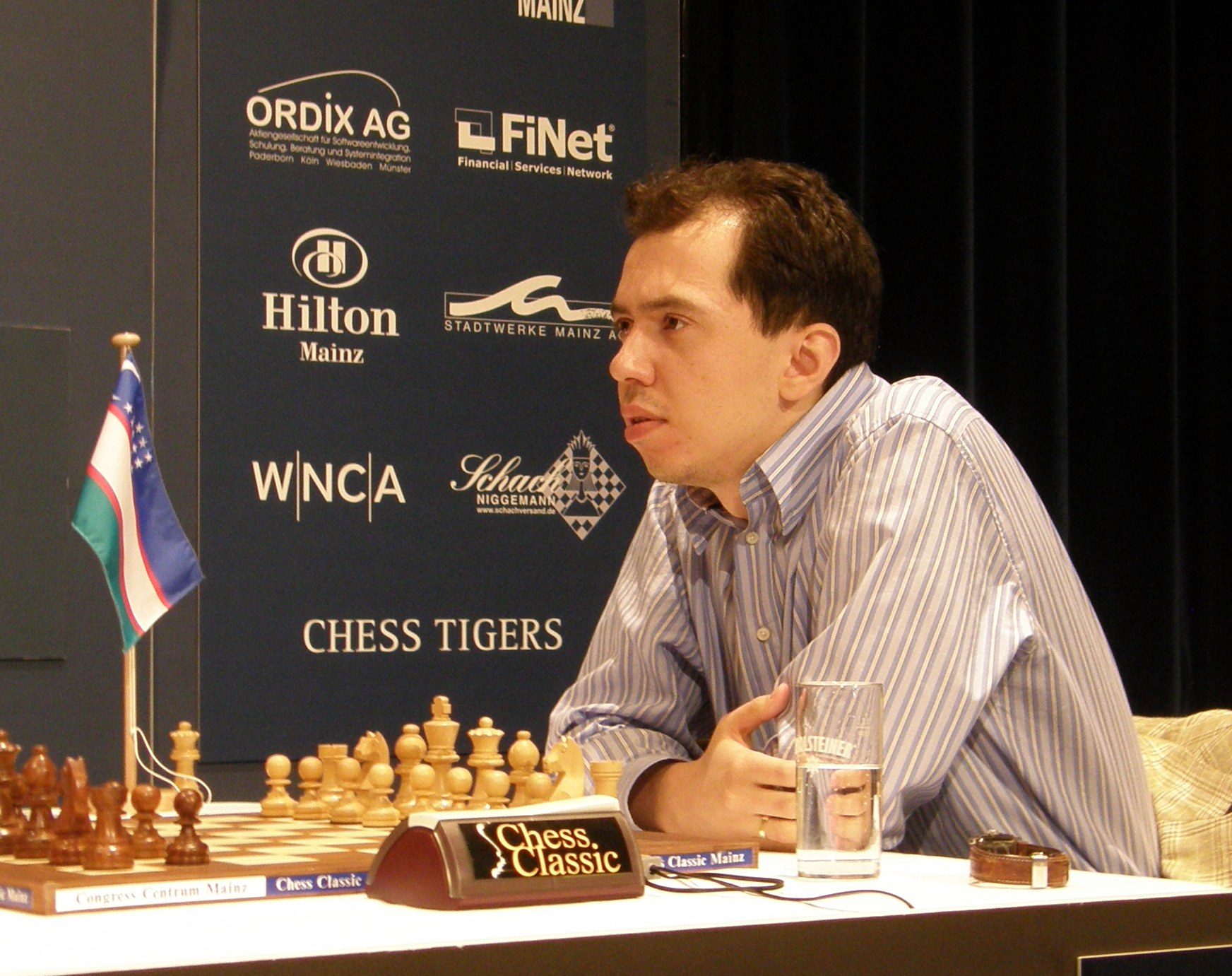
- Rustam Kasimdzhanov

Tournament details
- Host country: Libya
- City: Tripoli
- Venue: Almahary Hotel
- Dates: 18 June – 13 July 2004
- Format: Single-elimination tournament
- Participants: 128

Final positions
- Champions: (Uzbekistan) Rustam Kasimdzhanov
- Runners-up: (England) Michael Adams

Tournament statistics
- Matches played: 127

The FIDE World Chess Championship 2004 was held at the Almahary Hotel in Tripoli, Libya, from June 18 to July 13, 2004.

It was won by Rustam Kasimdzhanov, who beat Michael Adams in the final by a score of 4½–3½. He won about US$100,000 and the title of FIDE World Chess Champion.

The intention was that the tournament winner would play the world's top-ranked player at the time, Garry Kasparov, in a step towards the reunification of the World Chess Championship (which had been split into two separate titles since the World Chess Championship 1993); that match, however, never took place.

== Reunification of the title ==
=== Pre-tournament ===
Since 1993, when Garry Kasparov and Nigel Short broke away from chess governing body FIDE to play their world championship match under the auspices of the newly formed Professional Chess Association, there had been two chess world championships: one organised by FIDE (which used the knock-out format from 1998 to 2004) and one by a variety of other bodies (in the form of a long match between champion and challenger). The 2004 FIDE Championship was a part of what was, at the time, the most serious attempt yet to reunify the title, the Prague Agreement.

The plan under this 2002 agreement was that reigning FIDE World Champion Ruslan Ponomariov and FIDE World #1 Garry Kasparov would play a match, and that the Classical World Champion Vladimir Kramnik and winner of Dortmund 2002 (which turned out to be Péter Lékó) would play a match. The winners of these two matches would then play one another to produce a unified champion.

The match between Ponomariov and Kasparov fell through after FIDE refused to alter various things in the contract on Ponomariov's request, and he refused to sign. FIDE announced that instead the winner of the next FIDE Knockout Championship played against Kasparov in a match to be held not later than July 2005 (Kramnik and Lékó played their match in September–October 2004). Therefore, as well as the championship determining who was to be the next FIDE world champion, it would also determine who played Kasparov in what was effectively a semifinal match for the unified championship.

=== Post-tournament ===
After Kasimdzhanov's victory, FIDE opened the bidding for the Kasimdzhanov-Kasparov match in August 2004, with bids to be received by September 15. This deadline was later extended to September 25. The organizer was to be chosen at the FIDE Presidential Board meeting in October 2004, but in fact, FIDE President Kirsan Ilyumzhinov announced ahead of this time that the match had been awarded to the United Arab Emirates.

The plan did not come to fruition: the promised funding for the match never arrived, and plans to hold the match instead in Turkey also came to nothing. The whole question of how and when the Kasparov-Kasimdzhanov match would take place, or what would occur in its stead, was made irrelevant by Kasparov's announcement in March 2005 that he was retiring from serious chess.

Kasimdzhanov's victory earned him (and runner-up Michael Adams) an invitation to the FIDE World Chess Championship 2005. Kasimdzhanov also gained automatic entry to the Candidates Tournament for the FIDE World Chess Championship 2007.

The World Championship was eventually reunified in 2006, when classical champion Kramnik defeated the winner of the FIDE World Chess Championship 2005, Veselin Topalov.

== Controversies ==
The event attracted many controversies.

=== Format ===
The time controls were increased by 15 minutes compared to 2002 (90 minutes instead of 75 minutes for the first 40 moves, followed by 15 minutes until the end of the game and an incremental time of 30 seconds per move from move one.) But Zhang Zhong still said "the time limit is too fast for such a World Championship. We should call it a World Cup … a World Championship needs more classic time controls" and Nigel Short claimed that "If you took the top 100 players and survey their opinion you would probably find around 75% are against this time control".

Another criticism centered on the knockout format of the tournament. Although knockout matches had been used prior to the introduction of this tournament format, the brevity of these matches (Best of 2 elimination matches with a Best of 6 Championship Match, as opposed to the Best of 10 elimination matches and Best of 24 Championship Match seen in earlier cycles) led many to consider them to be of little value in determining the better player.

=== Location ===
Perhaps the greatest criticism concerned the choice of Libya as venue. Claims of human rights abuses, and state-sponsored terrorism caused some consternation, but on a more practical level the country's history of not allowing entry to citizens of Israel has been of some concern, as three Israeli players (Boris Gelfand, Emil Sutovsky and Ilya Smirin) had either qualified for the championships or were high on the list of reserves (in the event of qualifiers choosing not to play). Additionally, a number of players had joint Israeli and American citizenship, and so were also expected to be disallowed entry.

With this in mind, FIDE originally announced that a parallel event in Malta would be held alongside the one in Tripoli to ensure that Israeli players could take part—Sutovsky sent his entry form back on the condition he played in Malta. This parallel event was cancelled, however, following a press release from the Libyan authorities that "The Great Socialist People's Libyan Arab Jamahiriya will pleasantly provide entry visas to all the qualified participants of this great Championship", which was taken by most (including FIDE) to mean that all players, including Israelis, would be welcome to take part. This appeared to be contradicted by a statement from Mohammed Qadhafi, chairman of the Libyan Olympic Committee (FIDE is affiliated with the IOC) and son of Libyan leader Muammar al-Gaddafi, that "We [the Libyans] did not and will not invite the Zionist enemy to this championship."

Several prominent figures criticized FIDE over this matter, with both Grandmaster Boris Gulko, a Jew with joint American and Israeli citizenship, and Beatriz Marinello, president of the United States Chess Federation writing open letters to FIDE criticizing their handling of the issue.

On May 13, the Anti-Defamation League wrote to FIDE, saying it was "troubling" that Libya should be hosting the championships, and urging FIDE to ensure that Israeli players were treated equally. The letter raised concerns over the Libyans not allowing the coaches and families of Israeli players into the country. Similar concerns were expressed in an Association of Chess Professionals (ACP) open letter of May 26 (the ACP also criticized several other aspects of the tournament's organization).

FIDE maintained throughout that Israeli players would have been issued with visas upon their arrival in Libya. This assurance was never put to the test, however: none of the qualified players took part in the championship and Boris Gulko, who has joint American and Israeli citizenship, withdrew from the event after initially indicating he would play (fellow Americans Alexander Shabalov and Alexander Onischuk also withdrew in sympathy with the concerns of Gulko and others). The only player in the final list of participants with an Israeli passport—Vadim Milov, representing Switzerland—never travelled to Libya: he complained that his official invitation to the event had arrived so late (on the day of the opening ceremony, one day before the first game) that it was physically impossible for him to get to Libya with it in time. Milov claims that this constituted a deliberate attempt by FIDE to exclude him. In response, FIDE said that the delay in sending Milov's invitation was due to Milov not sending them his passport details until a deadline had passed, and that even with this delay, Milov could still have arrived in Tripoli in time for his first game, which they had offered to postpone if necessary. Milov took his case to the Court of Arbitration for Sport (Tribunal Arbitral de Sport) in Lausanne which found that FIDE "undertook extraordinary efforts to make sure that Claimant [Milov] could participate in the WCC 2004 although such efforts could and should have been made earlier" and ultimately cleared FIDE of any ill-intentioned effort to exclude Milov, concluding "there is no ground for Claimant to claim damages from Respondent." Milov later responded to this decision in an open letter.

It was also reported that the Israeli chess federation was considering suing FIDE "for compensation for the damages incurred by our exclusion from this tournament".

=== Strength ===
As a result of these and other factors, many of the players who were invited to take part in the tournament – including world number two Viswanathan Anand, and number six Peter Svidler – declined. In addition, Kasparov, Kramnik and Lékó did not take part owing to them being involved at a later stage of the reunification process. This led to a somewhat weaker lineup than previous championships, with only three of the world's top ten accepting the invitation to play, and only two of those actually turning up to the event. This weakness has itself been a cause of controversy, with claims that any tournament with so many top players missing should not be considered a World Championship at all.

== List of participants ==
On May 28, FIDE published a list of participants in the championship which was billed as "final". However, changes were made following the withdrawal of Gulko, Shabalov and Onischuk. A later "final" list included players of a range of skills from Veselin Topalov (rated 2737 and number five in the world on the FIDE Elo rating list) down to Tarik Abulhul (rated just 2076). It included only three of the world's top ten.

The following are the 128 players included in this list in order of seeding (from highest ranked to lowest), with the country they represent and their FIDE Elo rating on the April 2004 list:

1. Veselin Topalov (Bulgaria) 2737
2. Alexander Morozevich (Russia) 2732
3. Michael Adams (England) 2731
4. Alexander Grischuk (Russia) 2719
5. Vasyl Ivanchuk (Ukraine) 2716
6. Nigel Short (England) 2712
7. Vladimir Malakhov (Russia) 2695
8. Liviu-Dieter Nisipeanu (Romania) 2692
9. Ivan Sokolov (Netherlands) 2690
10. Alexey Dreev (Russia) 2689
11. Vladimir Akopian (Armenia) 2689
12. Ye Jiangchuan (China) 2681
13. Vadim Milov (Switzerland) 2680
14. Zurab Azmaiparashvili (Georgia) 2679
15. Étienne Bacrot (France) 2675
16. Mikhail Gurevich (Belgium) 2672
17. Sergei Rublevsky (Russia) 2671
18. Teimour Radjabov (Azerbaijan) 2670
19. Aleksej Aleksandrov (Belarus) 2668
20. Alexander Beliavsky (Slovenia) 2667
21. Francisco Vallejo Pons (Spain) 2666
22. Viktor Bologan (Moldova) 2665
23. Konstantin Sakaev (Russia) 2665
24. Krishnan Sasikiran (India) 2659
25. Shakhriyar Mamedyarov (Azerbaijan) 2657
26. Alexander Graf (Germany) 2656
27. Vadim Zvjaginsev (Russia) 2654
28. Rustam Kasimdzhanov (Uzbekistan) 2652
29. Loek van Wely (Netherlands) 2651
30. Alexander Motylev (Russia) 2649
31. Giovanni Vescovi (Brazil) 2648
32. Predrag Nikolić (Bosnia and Herzegovina) 2648
33. Sergei Movsesian (Slovakia) 2647
34. Levon Aronian (Armenia) 2645
35. Jóhann Hjartarson (Iceland) 2640
36. Valerij Filippov (Russia) 2639
37. Rafael Vaganian (Armenia) 2639
38. Kiril Georgiev (Macedonia) 2637
39. Vladislav Tkachiev (France) 2635
40. Smbat Lputian (Armenia) 2634
41. Zhang Zhong (China) 2633
42. Bartłomiej Macieja (Poland) 2633
43. Alexander Moiseenko (Ukraine) 2631
44. Zoltán Almási (Hungary) 2631
45. Mikhail Kobalia (Russia) 2630
46. Sergei Volkov (Russia) 2629
47. Peter Heine Nielsen (Denmark) 2628
48. Viorel Iordăchescu (Moldova) 2627
49. Zdenko Kožul (Croatia) 2627
50. Darmen Sadvakasov (Kazakhstan) 2626
51. Alexander Lastin (Russia) 2622
52. Bu Xiangzhi (China) 2621
53. Evgeny Vladimirov (Kazakhstan) 2621
54. Evgeny Alekseev (Russia) 2616
55. Baadur Jobava (Georgia) 2616
56. Rustem Dautov (Germany) 2616
57. Gabriel Sargissian (Armenia) 2614
58. Leinier Domínguez (Cuba) 2612
59. Michał Krasenkow (Poland) 2609
60. Xu Jun (China) 2608
61. Vasilios Kotronias (Cyprus) 2607
62. Karen Asrian (Armenia) 2605
63. Lázaro Bruzón (Cuba) 2602
64. Aleksander Delchev (Bulgaria) 2602
65. Aleksandr Galkin (Russia) 2602
66. Pavel Smirnov (Russia) 2601
67. Evgenij Agrest (Sweden) 2601
68. Giorgi Kacheishvili (Georgia) 2600
69. Pentala Harikrishna (India) 2599
70. Gilberto Milos (Brazil) 2599
71. Ernesto Inarkiev (Russia) 2595
72. Sergei Tiviakov (Netherlands) 2593
73. Andrei Kharlov (Russia) 2593
74. Rubén Felgaer (Argentina) 2592
75. Utut Adianto (Indonesia) 2591
76. Ni Hua (China) 2587
77. Ashot Anastasian (Armenia) 2587
78. Robert Kempiński (Poland) 2586
79. Pavel Kotsur (Kazakhstan) 2586
80. Đào Thiên Hải (Vietnam) 2583
81. Ivan Morovic Fernandez (Chile) 2583
82. Surya Ganguly (India) 2582
83. Hikaru Nakamura (USA) 2580
84. Sergey Karjakin (Ukraine) 2580
85. Mohammed Al-Modiahki (Qatar) 2579
86. Sergey Dolmatov (Russia) 2573
87. Šarūnas Šulskis (Lithuania) 2570
88. Rafael Leitão (Brazil) 2564
89. Merab Gagunashvili (Georgia) 2562
90. Yury Shulman (USA) 2559
91. Aleksander Wojtkiewicz (USA) 2559
92. Ehsan Ghaem Maghami (Iran) 2558
93. Daniel Cámpora (Argentina) 2557
94. Sergey Kudrin (USA) 2557
95. Magnus Carlsen (Norway) 2552
96. Konstantin Landa (Russia) 2550
97. Péter Ács (Hungary) 2548
98. Gadir Guseinov (Azerbaijan) 2548
99. Hichem Hamdouchi (Morocco) 2544
100. Alexander Ivanov (USA) 2544
101. Alejandro Ramírez (Costa Rica) 2542
102. Darcy Lima (Brazil) 2542
103. Dibyendu Barua (India) 2539
104. Valeriy Neverov (Ukraine) 2537
105. Leonid Kritz (Germany) 2534
106. Dimitrios Mastrovasilis (Greece) 2533
107. Mark Paragua (Philippines) 2529
108. Rodrigo Vasquez (Chile) 2523
109. Alexei Barsov (Uzbekistan) 2507
110. Essam El Gindy (Egypt) 2507
111. Mateusz Bartel (Poland) 2501
112. Ahmed Adly (Egypt) 2490
113. Darryl Johansen (Australia) 2489
114. Pascal Charbonneau (Canada) 2484
115. Morteza Mahjoob (Iran) 2478
116. Das Neelotpal (India) 2457
117. Carlos Garcia Palermo (Argentina) 2444
118. José González García (Mexico) 2443
119. Mohamed Tissir (Morocco) 2442
120. Amon Simutowe (Zambia) 2442
121. Ronald Dableo (Philippines) 2426
122. Kivanc Haznedaroglu (Turkey) 2395
123. Hameed Mansour Ali Kadhi (Yemen) 2379
124. Adlane Arab (Algeria) 2374
125. Kenny Solomon (South Africa) 2352
126. Hussein Asabri (Libya) 2277
127. Abobker Elarbi (Libya) 2257
128. Tarik Abulhul (Libya) 2076

Four players — Morozevich, Milov, Shulman and Hjartarson — did not appear for their first round matches and were defaulted.

== Rounds 1–4 ==
The tournament was played in the knock-out format which had become standard for FIDE championships in recent years. Rounds 1–5 consisted of two-game mini-matches; round six (the semi-finals) of four-game matches, and the final of a six-game match. These games were all played with a time control of 1 hour 30 minutes, plus an extra 15 minutes at move 40, and an increment of 30 seconds per move, starting with move one.

If the score at the end of a match was tied, tie-break games would be played. First, two games at a time control of 25 minutes for the whole game plus ten seconds increment per move. If the score was still tied, another two games would be played at a time control of five minutes with a ten-second increment per move. If the score was still tied after these four extra games, a single game of Armageddon Chess would be played where White had six minutes and Black had five, with no increment; White must win the game whereas Black only needed to draw.

All standard time control games began at 2:30 pm local time. Tie breaks began at 8:30 pm on the day of the last standard game, apart from tie-breaks for the semifinals which were played on 2:30 pm the day after the last standard game, and for the final which would be at 12:30 pm the day after the last standard game.

The Chief Arbiter for was Panagiotis Nikolopoulos.

=== Section 1 ===
First round
1	Veselin Topalov	2
128	Tarik Abulhul	0
64	Aleksander Delchev	1½
65	Aleksandr Galkin	½
32	Predrag Nikolić	1½
97	Péter Ács	2½
33	Sergei Movsesian	2½
96	Konstantin Landa	1½
16	Mikhail Gurevich	1½
113	Darryl Johansen	½
49	Zdenko Kožul	2
80	Đào Thiên Hải	0
17	Sergei Rublevsky	3
112	Ahmed Adly	1
48	Viorel Iordăchescu	1½
81	Ivan Morovic Fernandez	½

Quarter-finals
1	Veselin Topalov	2
64	Aleksander Delchev	0
97	Péter Ács	2
33	Sergei Movsesian	4
16	Mikhail Gurevich	½
49	Zdenko Kožul	1½
17	Sergei Rublevsky	3½
48	Viorel Iordăchescu	2½

Third round
1	Veselin Topalov	1½
33	Sergei Movsesian	½
49	Zdenko Kožul	2
17	Sergei Rublevsky	0

Fourth round
1	Veselin Topalov	2
49	Zdenko Kožul	0

=== Section 2 ===
First round
8	Liviu-Dieter Nisipeanu	1½
121	Ronald Dableo	½
57	Gabriel Sargissian	3
72	Sergei Tiviakov	4
25	Shakhriyar Mamedyarov	3
104	Valeriy Neverov	1
40	Smbat Lputian	2
89	Merab Gagunashvili	0
9	Ivan Sokolov	2
120	Amon Simutowe	0
56	Rustem Dautov	1½
73	Andrei Kharlov	2½
24	Krishnan Sasikiran	0
105	Leonid Kritz	2
41	Zhang Zhong	½
88	Rafael Leitão	1½

Quarter-finals
8	Liviu-Dieter Nisipeanu	1½
72	Sergei Tiviakov	½
25	Shakhriyar Mamedyarov	4
40	Smbat Lputian	3
9	Ivan Sokolov	½
73	Andrei Kharlov	1½
105	Leonid Kritz	½
88	Rafael Leitão	1½

Third round
8	Liviu-Dieter Nisipeanu	2½
25	Shakhriyar Mamedyarov	1½
73	Andrei Kharlov	1½
88	Rafael Leitão	½

Fourth round
8	Liviu-Dieter Nisipeanu	3
73	Andrei Kharlov	4

=== Section 3 ===
First round
4	Alexander Grischuk	1½
125	Kenny Solomon	½
61	Vasilios Kotronias	2½
68	Giorgi Kacheishvili	1½
29	Loek van Wely	3
100	Alexander Ivanov	1
36	Valerij Filippov	1½
93	Daniel Cámpora	½
13	Vadim Milov
116	Das Neelotpal	w/o
52	Bu Xiangzhi	½
77	Ashot Anastasian	1½
20	Alexander Beliavsky	2½
109	Alexei Barsov	1½
45	Mikhail Kobalia	1½
84	Sergey Karjakin	½

Quarter-finals
4	Alexander Grischuk	2
61	Vasilios Kotronias	0
29	Loek van Wely	2
36	Valerij Filippov	4
116	Das Neelotpal	1½
77	Ashot Anastasian	2½
20	Alexander Beliavsky	2½
45	Mikhail Kobalia	1½

Third round
4	Alexander Grischuk	4
36	Valerij Filippov	2
77	Ashot Anastasian	½
20	Alexander Beliavsky	1½

Fourth round
4	Alexander Grischuk	3½
20	Alexander Beliavsky	2½

=== Section 4 ===
First round
5	Vasyl Ivanchuk	2
124	Adlane Arab	0
60	Jun Xu	1½
69	Pentala Harikrishna	2½
28	Rustam Kasimdzhanov	2½
101	Alejandro Ramírez	1½
37	Rafael Vaganian	0
92	Ehsan Ghaem Maghami	2
12	Ye Jiangchuan	2½
117	Carlos Garcia Palermo	1½
53	Evgeny Vladimirov	3
76	Ni Hua	4
21	Francisco Vallejo Pons	3½
108	Rodrigo Vasquez	2½
44	Zoltán Almási	2
85	Mohammed Al-Modiahki	0

Quarter-finals
5	Vasyl Ivanchuk	3
69	Pentala Harikrishna	1
28	Rustam Kasimdzhanov	1½
92	Ehsan Ghaem Maghami	½
12	Ye Jiangchuan	4
76	Ni Hua	3
21	Francisco Vallejo Pons	1½
44	Zoltán Almási	2½

Third round
5	Vasyl Ivanchuk	1½
28	Rustam Kasimdzhanov	2½
12	Ye Jiangchuan	½
44	Zoltán Almási	1½

Fourth round
28	Rustam Kasimdzhanov	2
44	Zoltán Almási	0

=== Section 5 ===
First round
2	Alexander Morozevich
127	Abobker Elarbi	w/o
63	Lázaro Bruzón	1½
66	Pavel Smirnov	2½
31	Giovanni Vescovi	1½
98	Gadir Guseinov	2½
34	Levon Aronian	2½
95	Magnus Carlsen	1½
15	Étienne Bacrot	2
114	Pascal Charbonneau	0
50	Darmen Sadvakasov	2
79	Pavel Kotsur	0
18	Teimour Radjabov	2
111	Mateusz Bartel	0
47	Peter Heine Nielsen	2
82	Surya Ganguly	0

Quarter-finals
127	Abobker Elarbi	0
66	Pavel Smirnov	2
98	Gadir Guseinov	0
34	Levon Aronian	2
15	Étienne Bacrot	1½
50	Darmen Sadvakasov	½
18	Teimour Radjabov	4
47	Peter Heine Nielsen	3

Third round
66	Pavel Smirnov	4
34	Levon Aronian	3
15	Étienne Bacrot	1½
18	Teimour Radjabov	2½

Fourth round
66	Pavel Smirnov	2½
18	Teimour Radjabov	3½

=== Section 6 ===
First round
7	Vladimir Malakhov	1½
122	Kivanc Haznedaroglu	½
58	Leinier Domínguez	2½
71	Ernesto Inarkiev	1½
26	Alexander Graf	2
103	Dibyendu Barua	0
39	Vladislav Tkachiev	w/o
90	Yury Shulman
10	Alexey Dreev	2
119	Mohamed Tissir	0
55	Baadur Jobava	3
74	Rubén Felgaer	4
23	Konstantin Sakaev	1½
106	Dimitrios Mastrovasilis	½
42	Bartłomiej Macieja	½
87	Šarūnas Šulskis	1½

Quarter-finals
7	Vladimir Malakhov	3
58	Leinier Domínguez	4
26	Alexander Graf	½
39	Vladislav Tkachiev	1½
10	Alexey Dreev	2
74	Rubén Felgaer	0
23	Konstantin Sakaev	2
87	Šarūnas Šulskis	0

Third round
58	Leinier Domínguez	2
39	Vladislav Tkachiev	0
10	Alexey Dreev	4
23	Konstantin Sakaev	3

Fourth round
58	Leinier Domínguez	2½
10	Alexey Dreev	1½

=== Section 7 ===
First round
3	Michael Adams	2
126	Hussein Asabri	0
62	Karen Asrian	2½
67	Evgenij Agrest	1½
30	Alexander Motylev	½
99	Hichem Hamdouchi	1½
35	Jóhann Hjartarson
94	Sergey Kudrin	w/o
14	Zurab Azmaiparashvili	3
115	Morteza Mahjoob	1
51	Alexander Lastin	1½
78	Robert Kempiński	½
19	Aleksej Aleksandrov	1½
110	Essam El Gindy	½
46	Sergei Volkov	1
83	Hikaru Nakamura	3

Quarter-finals
3	Michael Adams	1½
62	Karen Asrian	½
99	Hichem Hamdouchi	4
94	Sergey Kudrin	3
14	Zurab Azmaiparashvili	1½
51	Alexander Lastin	2½
19	Aleksej Aleksandrov	½
83	Hikaru Nakamura	1½

Third round
3	Michael Adams	1½
99	Hichem Hamdouchi	½
51	Alexander Lastin	½
83	Hikaru Nakamura	1½

Fourth round
3	Michael Adams	1½
83	Hikaru Nakamura	½

=== Section 8 ===
First round
6	Nigel Short	2
123	Hameed Mansour Ali Kadhi	0
59	Michał Krasenkow	1½
70	Gilberto Milos	½
27	Vadim Zvjaginsev	2
102	Darcy Lima	0
38	Kiril Georgiev	½
91	Aleksander Wojtkiewicz	1½
11	Vladimir Akopian	1½
118	José González García	½
54	Evgeny Alekseev	½
75	Utut Adianto	1½
22	Viktor Bologan	3
107	Mark Paragua	1
43	Alexander Moiseenko	1½
86	Sergey Dolmatov	½

Quarter-finals
6	Nigel Short	½
59	Michał Krasenkow	1½
27	Vadim Zvjaginsev	2½
91	Aleksander Wojtkiewicz	1½
11	Vladimir Akopian	1½
75	Utut Adianto	½
22	Viktor Bologan	1½
43	Alexander Moiseenko	2½

Third round
59	Michał Krasenkow	1½
27	Vadim Zvjaginsev	½
11	Vladimir Akopian	1½
43	Alexander Moiseenko	½

Fourth round
59	Michał Krasenkow	½
11	Vladimir Akopian	1½

Nigel Short vs. Michał Krasenkow

Position: g7 black king, c6 white rook, f6 black pawn, g6 white bishop, h6 black pawn, e5 black bishop, g5 black knight, h5 white pawn, e3 white king

Position after move 120

Round 1 games were played on June 19 and June 20, with tie-breaks on the evening of June 20. Four of the sixty-four scheduled round one matches games did not take place at all: Morozevich, Milov, Shulman and Hjartarson all failed to appear for their first game; their opponents (Elarbi, Neelotpal, Tkachiev and Kudrin) progressed into round two by default. Top seed Topalov had problems with his flight into Libya, and the start of his first game had to be postponed until 5 pm. The seeding system in operation, whereby the top seed plays the bottom seed, the number 2 plays number 127, number 3 plays number 126 and so on, meant that serious round one upsets were unlikely, and indeed there were few surprises. Several of the top players, among them Ye (seeded 12), Azmaiparashvili (14) and Rublevsky (17) required the first pair of tie-break games to advance, and Vallejo Pons (21) only went through after the two five-minute games, but in the end, all progressed as expected. The biggest first-round upset in terms of rating difference was Kritz (rated 2534 and seeded 105) knocking out Sasikiran (2659 / 24) by winning both standard games. Apart from the defaults, he and Hamdouchi (who beat Motylev) were the only players to overcome a rating difference of more than 100 points to advance to round two.

Ivanchuk vs. Kasimdzhanov

Position: c8 black rook, g8 black king, b7 black bishop, e7 black queen, f7 black pawn, g7 black pawn, h7 black pawn, a6 black pawn, b6 black pawn, e6 black pawn, f6 black knight, d4 white knight, a3 white pawn, b3 white pawn, g3 white pawn, e2 white pawn, f2 white pawn, g2 white bishop, h2 white pawn, d1 white rook, e1 white queen, g1 white king

Position before 21.Rc1

Round 2 games were played on June 21 and June 22, with tie-breaks on the evening of June 22. Round two saw one major upset and a number of smaller ones. The big surprise was Nigel Short (6) being knocked out by Michał Krasenkow (59). In game one, Short (with white) had the advantage of rook for knight and pawn and was trying to squeeze a win out of it when, after around five hours of play, the position in the diagram arose. Short played the blunder 121.Re6??, and resigned a move later. He obtained a slight advantage in game two, but it wasn't enough to win, and the draw knocked him out of the competition. Other upsets included Sokolov (9) losing out to Kharlov (73), Malakhov (7) being knocked out by Domínguez (58) in the last tie-breaker and Azmaiparashvili (14) losing to Lastin (51). Most of the top players had little difficulty, however: Topalov (1), Adams (3), Grischuk (4), Nisipeanu (8), and Dreev (10) all progressed after the first two games. Ivanchuk (5) required tie-breakers, but still advanced to round three as expected.

Round 3 games were played on June 23 and June 24, with tie-breaks on the evening of June 24. The surprise of round three was Ivanchuk (5) being knocked out by Kasimdzhanov (28). The two standard time control games had been fairly quiet affairs and were both drawn (the second, with Kasimdzhanov white, after just 16 moves) and the first rapid game was also drawn. In the second, Ivanchuk, despite having white, did little to press for a win, and the fairly level position shown arose. 21. Bxb7 Qxb7 appears to be equal, but Ivanchuk instead played 21.Rc1?, which simply lost a pawn to 21...Qxa3. Ivanchuk resigned six moves later, in a position which was certainly worse but from which many players would have at least tried to play on. Ivanchuk has something of a reputation for being let down by his nerves, and this may have been another instance of that. Elsewhere, there were minor surprises when Krasenkow (59) followed up on his victory over Short to eliminate Zvjaginsev (27), 16-year-old Nakamura (83) – the youngest player remaining in the tournament – dispatched Lastin (51), and Grischuk (4) required the blitz tie-breakers to see off Filippov (36). Kozul's (49) win over Rublevsky (17) took his score for the event to 5½/6, with a Performance rating of over 3000. Top seeds Topalov (1) and Adams (3) advanced with little difficulty, winning their games with white and drawing with black.

After a rest day on June 25, the Round 4 games were played on June 26 and June 27, with tie-breaks on the evening of June 27. Two surprise results occurred when Kharlov (73) and Domínguez continued their impressive runs by knocking out Nisipeanu (8) and Dreev (10), respectively, both recording their second win against a top 10 player in the tournament.

== Rounds 5–6 ==
Round 5: Quarterfinals (best of 2)
1	(Bulgaria) Veselin Topalov	2
73	(Russia) Andrei Kharlov	0
4	(Russia) Alexander Grischuk	1
28	(Uzbekistan) Rustam Kasimdzhanov	3
18	(Azerbaijan) Teimour Radjabov	3½
58	(Cuba) Leinier Domínguez	3½
3	(England) Michael Adams	1½
11	(Armenia) Vladimir Akopian	½

Round 6: Semifinals (best of 4)
1	(Bulgaria) Veselin Topalov	2
28	(Uzbekistan) Rustam Kasimdzhanov	4
18	(Azerbaijan) Teimour Radjabov	1½
3	(England) Michael Adams	2½

Round 7: Final (best of 6)
28	(Uzbekistan) Rustam Kasimdzhanov	4½
3	(England) Michael Adams	3½

Kasimdzhanov vs. Grischuk

Position: d8 white rook, c7 black king, e7 black rook, c6 black pawn, g6 black pawn, a5 black pawn, c5 black bishop, g5 white knight, a4 white pawn, e4 white pawn, f4 white pawn, b3 black bishop, d3 white rook, f3 white king, g3 white knight, b2 black rook

Position before 46...Bc2

The quarterfinals were played on June 28 and June 29, with tie-breaks on the evening of June 29.

In game one of round five, every game ended in a win for white. Top seeds Topalov (who had won every game apart from one draw going into this round) and Adams won as expected, but the other two wins were slight upsets. Radjabov lost to Dominguez after a complicated opening after which white emerged with three connected passed pawns for a bishop, and Grischuk lost to Kasimdzhanov in an exchange Ruy Lopez. In the position shown in the diagram, which appears to be better for Black, Grischuk slipped up with 46...Bc2? allowing 47.Ne6+. This forks the king and bishop on c5, so 47...Rxe6 is forced, but this deflects the rook from defence of d7, allowing 48.R3d7+ Kb6 49.Rb8+, a skewer which picks up the rook on b2. Grischuk fought on before resigning on move 73. The match Radjabov-Dominguez ended 3½–3½ with Radjabov only advancing by virtue of drawing with black in the final Armageddon tie-breaker.

Radjabov vs. Adams

Position: a8 black rook, d8 black queen, e8 black king, f8 black bishop, h8 black rook, b7 black pawn, c7 black pawn, d7 black bishop, f7 black pawn, g7 black pawn, h7 black pawn, a6 black pawn, c6 black knight, e6 black pawn, d5 black knight, c4 black pawn, d4 white pawn, c3 white knight, e3 white pawn, g3 white pawn, a2 white pawn, b2 white pawn, d2 white knight, f2 white pawn, g2 white bishop, h2 white pawn, a1 white rook, c1 white bishop, d1 white queen, f1 white rook, g1 white king

Position before 9...Nb6

After a rest day on June 30, the semifinals were played on July 1, 2, 3 and 4, with tie-breaks on July 5.

The first game of Kasimdzhanov-Topalov was a Queen's Gambit which was drawn after just fifteen moves in a position that has occurred in Grandmaster play several times before. Kasimdzhanov did not press for a win, despite having the advantage of the white pieces. He followed a similar strategy in his match against Ivanchuk, possibly in the belief that if he could draw the standard time control games, he would have better chances in rapid and blitz.

Radjabov-Adams game one was more eventful. Radjabov went for the Catalan Opening and Adams introduced a new idea in the position shown with 9...Nb6 10.Qe2 Na5 to hold on to his extra c-pawn (in the past, 9...Nxc3 10.bxc3 b5 had been played). Radjabov was unable to do much with any compensation he may have had, and eventually Adams was left a clean pawn up. He successfully converted this into a win to go 1–0 up. In game two, Adams played the Rossolimo to Radjabov's Sicilian Defence (1.e4 c5 2.Nf3 Nc6 3.Bb5). Neither player obtained a significant advantage and a draw was agreed after White's 17th move.

Topalov-Kasimdzhanov game two looked for a while like it would become more interesting. Kasimdzhanov played the Kan Sicilian Defence (1.e4 c5 2.Nf3 e6 3.d4 cxd4 4.Nxd4 a6) and Topalov opted for a Maróczy Bind-type structure with 5.c4. In response, Kasimdzhanov set up a hedgehog (with pawns on a6, b6, d6 and e6) and pushed his h-pawn to h3 to soften up Topalov's king side. In an unclear position, moves were repeated, and a draw was agreed after move 25. Game three was harder-fought. From a Sicilian Defence, Topalov gained control of the open c-file and invaded the White position, while Kasimdzhanov obtained some king-side pressure. Topalov's position appeared preferable, but he was unable to turn his advantage into anything solid and, with both players becoming short of time, Kasimdzhanov won a pawn. Topalov appeared to have everything under control, however, and, by using his king actively, ensured that White could make no progress. A draw was agreed on move 63.

Radjabov-Adams game three was a Scotch Opening in which Radjabov appeared to build up a powerful attack. He may have missed a good chance to win with 26.Rf7. Instead a draw was agreed on move 27. This left Radjabov needing a win in game four to take the match to tie-breaks, a difficult feat when playing black against a 2700+ rated player. From the beginning of 2002 to this game, Adams had lost only one game with white in a normal time control game (against Alexei Shirov in Reykjavík 2003). Faced with such a tough task, Radjabov played an extremely unusual opening: the Gunderam Defence, 1.e4 e5 2.Nf3 Qe7?! Adams played solidly, however, and never had a worse position. The game was drawn in 44 moves, putting Adams into the final.

Topalov-Kasimdzhanov game four was a Bogo-Indian. Neither side seemed to have much of an advantage for most of the game, and when things simplified to a queen and knight endgame, it seemed a draw would result. Topalov played on, however, and managed to win a couple of pawns. In the end, though, Kasimdzhanov did manage to hold the draw with a perpetual check. This meant that rapid tie-breaks were required to decide the match. To the surprise of most, Kasimdzhanov won both games fairly quickly and went through to the final.

== The final ==
The final was to be contested between Michael Adams of England and Rustam Kasimdzhanov of Uzbekistan. Adams' presence in the final was no surprise to most: he had been a member of the chess elite for some years, and chess statistician Jeff Sonas, for example, reckoned him to have a 10 to 1 chance of winning before the tournament. Kasimdzhanov, on the other hand, was never expected to get this far (Sonas giving him just a 150–1 chance of winning), and although he had achieved some decent results in the past, he remained a largely unknown player. The two had met just three times previously: in a rapid game in Cannes in 2001, in the Bundesliga in 2002, and in Wijk aan Zee in 2002. All three games had been drawn.

The final was played on July 6, 7, 8, 10, 11 and 12, with a rest day on July 9 and tie-breaks on July 13. In the end, Kasimdzhanov beat Adams 4½–3½ after the rapid tie-breaks, the match having been tied 3-3 after the six standard games. At number 28 seed, his victory came as somewhat of a surprise to most of the chess world.

FIDE World Chess Championship Final 2004
	Rating	1	2	3	4	5	6	R1	R2	Points
Michael Adams (ENG)	2731	½	0	1	0	1	½	0	½	3½
Rustam Kasimdzhanov (UZB)	2652	½	1	0	1	0	½	1	½	4½

=== Regular games ===
==== Game 1: Adams–Kasimdzhanov, ½–½ ====
Game one, in which Adams had white, saw the Kan Variation of the Sicilian Defence (1.e4 c5 2.Nf3 e6 3.d4 cxd4 4.Nxd4 a6). Kasimdzhanov equalised quite early, and a quick draw was agreed.

Sicilian Defence, Kan Variation (B42)
1. e4 c5 2. Nf3 e6 3. d4 cxd4 4. Nxd4 a6 5. Bd3 Bc5 6. Nb3 Ba7 7. c4 Nc6 8. Nc3 Nge7 9. 0-0 d6 10. Kh1 e5 11. f4 exf4 12. Bxf4 Ng6 13. Bg3 Nge5 14. Be2 0-0 15. Qe1 Be6 16. Nd5 a5 17. a4 Bxd5 18. cxd5 ½–½

==== Game 2: Kasimdzhanov–Adams, 1–0 ====
Kasimdzhanov–Adams, game 2

Position: d8 black rook, a7 black pawn, e7 black rook, g7 black king, h7 black pawn, e6 black bishop, g6 black pawn, a5 white pawn, b5 white pawn, c5 black pawn, e5 white knight, d4 black knight, f4 white pawn, c3 white rook, g3 white pawn, d1 white rook, f1 white bishop, g1 white king

Position before 40.Kf2

In game two, Adams played the Petrov Defence. His knight ended up somewhat out of the game on a5, and his e5 square was weak, allowing Kasimdzhanov to plant a knight there and obtain a significant positional advantage. Both players blundered on the last move of the time control (after which they each got an extra 15 minutes): in the position shown, Kasimdzhanov played 40.Kf2? which Adams should have answered with 40...Nxb5! which is at least equal; instead, he returned the favour with 40...Rc8?, and White was still significantly better. Following 41.Rb1 g5 42.b6 axb6 43.axb6 gxf4 44.gxf4 Bd5 45.Bd3, a similar thing happened when Adams blundered with 45...Rf8? This pins the f4 pawn to the king and so seems to leave the e5 knight undefended, and it was probably for this reason that Kasimdzhanov played 46.Ke3? However, he could have won immediately with 46.Rxc5! when 46...Rxe5 does not work because of 47.Rc7+ when Black must either break the pin with 47...Kf6 or 47...Rf7 48.Rxf7 Kxf7 thus allowing fxe5; or else be mated with 47...Kg8 48.Rg1+ Kh8 49.Rxh7# or 47...Kh8 48.Rxh7+ Kg8 49.Rg1+ Rg5 50.Rxg5#. 46...Ne6 is also no good after 47.Rxd5 Nxf4 48.Rd7 Rxd7 49.Nxd7 Nxd3+ 50.Ke3. In the event, Adams did not take advantage of White's mistake, and continued with 46...Nc6? (46...Ne6 was a much better try). The game ended 47.Rxc5 Nxe5 48.fxe5 Bb7 49.Be4 Rff7 50.Bxb7 Rxb7 51.Ke4 Rfd7 52.Rc6 Kf8 53.e6 Rd2 54.Rf1+ Ke8 55.Rc8+ and Adams resigned.

Petrov Defence (C42)
1. e4 e5 2. Nf3 Nf6 3. Nxe5 d6 4. Nf3 Nxe4 5. d4 d5 6. Bd3 Nc6 7. 0-0 Be7 8. c4 Nb4 9. Be2 0-0 10. Nc3 Be6 11. Ne5 f6 12. Nf3 Kh8 13. a3 Nxc3 14. bxc3 Nc6 15. Nd2 Na5 16. cxd5 Bxd5 17. c4 Bf7 18. Bb2 f5 19. Bc3 c5 20. d5 Bf6 21. Qc2 b6 22. Bd3 Bxc3 23. Qxc3 Nb7 24. Nf3 Nd6 25. Ne5 f4 26. Rfe1 Bg8 27. Nc6 Qg5 28. Qe5 Qxe5 29. Nxe5 Rfe8 30. a4 g6 31. g3 fxg3 32. hxg3 Kg7 33. f4 Re7 34. a5 b5 35. cxb5 Bxd5 36. Bf1 Nf5 37. Ra3 Nd4 38. Rd1 Rd8 39. Rc3 Be6 (diagram) 40. Kf2 Rc8 41. Rb1 g5 42. b6 axb6 43. axb6 gxf4 44. gxf4 Bd5 45. Bd3 Rf8 46. Ke3 Nc6 47. Rxc5 Nxe5 48. fxe5 Bb7 49. Be4 Rff7 50. Bxb7 Rxb7 51. Ke4 Rfd7 52. Rc6 Kf8 53. e6 Rd2 54. Rf1+ Ke8 55. Rc8+ 1–0

==== Game 3: Adams–Kasimdzhanov, 1–0 ====
Adams–Kasimdzhanov, game 3

Position: d8 black rook, f8 black rook, g8 black king, b7 white rook, f7 black pawn, g7 black pawn, h7 black pawn, e6 black queen, a5 black pawn, d5 white knight, a4 white pawn, b4 black bishop, d4 white queen, b3 white pawn, g3 white pawn, f2 white pawn, h2 white pawn, d1 white rook, g1 white king

Position before 30...Rd6

Game three was another Kan Sicilian, but Adams varied from game one early with 5.Nc3 instead of 5.Bd3. His 10.Qd2 in reply to 9...Bc5 was a new move (previously, 10.e5, which Adams had himself played in his win against Topalov at Tilburg in 1998, was normal): this may be planning 11.Qg5 which would prompt a weakening ...g6; if black defends with 10...f6, for example, then White can play 11.b4!? when 11...Bxb4 (11...Bd6 may be better) 12.Nxb5 leaves White with a strong position. Kasimdzhanov instead retreated with 10...Be7, losing a tempo, and he never managed to equalise. Adams' pieces ended up being much more active than their black counterparts, and he eventually planted a strong knight on b5 and a rook on the seventh rank. Adams won a pawn, but turning that into a win did not seem straightforward until Kasimdzhanov played 30...Rd6?! in the position shown. This allowed Adams to make simplifying exchanges with 31.Rxb4 axb4 32.Ne7+ Qxe7 33.Qxd6. Now exchanging queens leaves a fairly trivially won rook endgame, so Kasimdzhanov instead played 33...Qe2, but this lost another pawn after 34.Rd4 h5 35.Qxb4, and White had a won position. Kasimdzhanov resigned on move 47, making the match level at 1½–1½.

Sicilian Defence, Kan Variation (B43)
1. e4 c5 2. Nf3 e6 3. d4 cxd4 4. Nxd4 a6 5. Nc3 b5 6. Bd3 Qb6 7. Nf3 Qc7 8. 0-0 Bb7 9. Re1 Bc5 10. Qd2 Be7 11. b3 Nf6 12. Bb2 d6 13. a4 b4 14. Na2 Nc6 15. Nd4 Nxd4 16. Bxd4 a5 17. Rac1 0-0 18. c3 bxc3 19. Nxc3 Qd8 20. Nb5 e5 21. Rc7 exd4 22. Rxb7 d5 23. Qf4 Bb4 24. Rd1 dxe4 25. Bxe4 Nxe4 26. Qxe4 Qf6 27. Nc7 Rad8 28. Nd5 Qd6 29. Qxd4 Qe6 30. g3 (diagram) 30... Rd6 31. Rxb4 axb4 32. Ne7+ Qxe7 33. Qxd6 Qe2 34. Rd4 h5 35. Qxb4 Qf3 36. h4 Rc8 37. Qd2 Rc3 38. Rf4 Qc6 39. Kh2 Rxb3 40. Qd8+ Kh7 41. Qd1 Rb7 42. Qxh5+ Kg8 43. Rd4 Qf6 44. Rd2 Ra7 45. a5 g6 46. Qb5 Kh7 47. Qb6 1–0

==== Game 4: Kasimdzhanov–Adams, 1–0 ====
Kasimdzhanov–Adams, game 4

Position: a8 black rook, e8 black king, c7 black pawn, g7 black pawn, a6 black rook, c6 black pawn, e6 black knight, a5 white knight, b5 black pawn, c5 white pawn, e5 black bishop, h5 black pawn, b4 white pawn, e4 white pawn, d3 white rook, e3 white bishop, h3 white pawn, e2 white king, f2 white pawn, g1 white rook

Position before 30...Rxa5

After losing with the Petrov in game two, Adams instead played his usual 2...Nc6. Kasimdzhanov played the exchange variation of the Ruy Lopez, as he had against Grischuk in round five, and they followed theory until Adams' novelty 12...f5. White exchanged pieces and played against Black's weakened queenside, a typical plan in this variation. Adams came under considerable pressure, but it seemed he may be able to hold White off until, in the diagrammed position, he apparently tired of passive defence, and lashed out with 30...Rxa5? (30...Ke7 is probably better), which after 31.bxa5 Rxa5 32.f4! Bxf4 33.Rg6 Kf7 34.Rxe6 Kxe6 35.Bxf4 left him with just two weak pawns for a bishop. Adams resigned on move 40.

Ruy Lopez, Exchange Variation, Gligoric Variation (C69)
1. e4 e5 2. Nf3 Nc6 3. Bb5 a6 4. Bxc6 dxc6 5. 0-0 Bg4 6. h3 h5 7. d3 Qf6 8. Be3 Bxf3 9. Qxf3 Qxf3 10. gxf3 Bd6 11. Nd2 Ne7 12. Rfb1 f5 13. b4 a5 14. a3 0-0 15. Nc4 axb4 16. axb4 b5 17. Na5 Ra6 18. c4 Ng6 19. Kf1 Rfa8 20. Bd2 fxe4 21. fxe4 Be7 22. c5 Bf6 23. Rd1 Kf7 24. Ke2 Ke8 25. Ra3 Nf8 26. d4 Ne6 27. dxe5 Bxe5 28. Be3 Bb2 29. Rad3 Be5 30. Rg1 (diagram) 30... Rxa5 31. bxa5 Rxa5 32. f4 Bxf4 33. Rg6 Kf7 34. Rxe6 Kxe6 35. Bxf4 Ra4 36. Kf3 Rc4 37. Be3 b4 38. Rd4 Rxd4 39. Bxd4 g5 40. Ke3 1–0

==== Game 5: Adams–Kasimdzhanov, 1–0 ====
Ruy Lopez, Closed Chigorin Variation (C97)
1. e4 e5 2. Nf3 Nc6 3. Bb5 a6 4. Ba4 Nf6 5. 0-0 Be7 6. Re1 b5 7. Bb3 d6 8. c3 0-0 9. h3 Na5 10. Bc2 c5 11. d4 Qc7 12. d5 Nc4 13. a4 Bd7 14. b3 Nb6 15. a5 Nc8 16. c4 b4 17. Nbd2 g6 18. Nf1 Nh5 19. Bh6 Re8 20. Qd2 Bf8 21. g4 Ng7 22. N3h2 Qd8 23. f4 exf4 24. Qxf4 Qe7 25. Nf3 f6 26. Ng3 Rd8 27. Rf1 Ne8 28. Bxf8 Qxf8 29. e5 dxe5 30. Nxe5 Ncd6 31. Rae1 Qg7 32. Nd3 Rac8 33. Qf2 f5 34. Ne5 Nf6 35. Nxd7 Rxd7 36. gxf5 g5 37. Re6 Kh8 38. Bd1 g4 39. hxg4 Rg8 40. Qf4 Nxg4 41. Bxg4 Qxg4 42. Qxg4 Rxg4 43. Kh2 h5 44. Kh3 Rd4 45. f6 Nf7 46. Rf5 1–0

==== Game 6: Kasimdzhanov–Adams, ½–½ ====
Kasimdzhanov–Adams, game 6

Position: g8 white queen, e7 black king, h7 black pawn, c6 black queen, e6 black pawn, g6 black pawn, b5 black pawn, g5 white pawn, b4 white pawn, d4 black bishop, a3 white pawn, g3 white king, h3 white pawn, a2 white bishop, f2 white pawn

Position before 42...Bxf2+

A pawn down, Adams was happy to take the draw with 42...Bxf2+ 43.Kxf2 Qc2+, when White has no way to escape the perpetual check. In fact, though, Adams could have won with 42...Qe4! when there is no satisfactory way to escape the mate threat 43...Be5+ 44.f4 Qxf4+ 45.Kg2 Qg3+ 46.Kf1 Qf3+ 47.Kg1 Bd4+ 48.Kh2 Qf2+ 49.Kh1 Qg1#. If White gives his king a flight square on f2 with 43.f3, then he gets mated by 43...Qe1+ 44.Kg4 Qg1+ 45.Kf4 e5+ 46.Ke4 Qe3+ 47.Kd5 Qxf3#; 43.Qxh7+ also leaves White doomed after 43...Kf8: for example, 44.Qh6+ Bg7 45.Qh4 Be5+ 46.f4 Qe1+ 47.Kg4 Qe2+ 48.Kg3 Bc3, and white has no defence to ...Be1; or 44.Qd7 Be5+ 45.f4 Bxf4+ (more simply, something like 45...Qxf4+ 46.Kg2 Qxg5+ 47.Kf2 Qg3+ 48.Ke2 Qg2+ 49.Kd1 Qxa2 also wins) 46.Kf2 Be3+ 47.Kf1 Qf3+ 48.Ke1 Qf2+ 49.Kd1 Qf1+ 50.Kc2 Qc1+ 51.Kb3 Qc4+ 52.Kb2 Bd4+ 53.Kb1 Qd3+ 54.Kc1 Be3+, and White loses his queen (with mate soon to follow).

Ruy Lopez, Closed (C91)
1. e4 e5 2. Nf3 Nc6 3. Bb5 a6 4. Ba4 Nf6 5. 0-0 Be7 6. Re1 b5 7. Bb3 0-0 8. d4 d6 9. c3 Bg4 10. Be3 exd4 11. cxd4 Na5 12. Bc2 c5 13. h3 cxd4 14. Bxd4 Bh5 15. g4 Bg6 16. Nc3 Rc8 17. Rc1 Nc6 18. Be3 Nb4 19. Bb1 d5 20. e5 Ne4 21. Ne2 Nc5 22. Bxc5 Rxc5 23. Rxc5 Bxc5 24. Nf4 Qb6 25. Rf1 Be4 26. a3 Nc6 27. Nxd5 Bxd5 28. Qxd5 Nd4 29. Kg2 Nxf3 30. Qxf3 g6 31. b4 Bd4 32. Qe4 Bb2 33. Rd1 Rd8 34. Rxd8+ Qxd8 35. Ba2 Qe7 36. e6 fxe6 37. Qa8+ Kf7 38. Qxa6 Qd7 39. g5 Ke7 40. Qa8 Bd4 41. Qg8 Qc6+ 42. Kg3 (diagram) Bxf2+ 43. Kxf2 Qc2+ 44. Ke3 ½–½

=== Tie-break games ===
The player named first played the white pieces.

==== Game 7: Adams–Kasimdzhanov, 0–1 ====
Sicilian Defence (B30)
1. e4 c5 2. Nf3 Nc6 3. Bb5 d6 4. 0-0 Bd7 5. Re1 Nf6 6. c3 a6 7. Ba4 b5 8. Bc2 Rc8 9. a4 g6 10. axb5 axb5 11. d4 cxd4 12. cxd4 Bg4 13. Nc3 b4 14. Ne2 Bg7 15. d5 Bxf3 16. gxf3 Ne5 17. Ba4+ Nfd7 18. Nd4 0-0 19. f4 Nc4 20. Nc6 Rxc6 21. dxc6 Nc5 22. Qe2 Nb6 23. Bb5 Nb3 24. Ra6 Nd4 25. Qd3 Na8 26. Ra4 Nc7 27. Rxb4 Qb8 28. Rxd4 Bxd4 29. Qxd4 Qxb5 30. f5 Rc8 31. Bh6 Ne8 32. e5 Rxc6 33. exd6 Rxd6 34. Qe5 Qxe5 35. Rxe5 Rd7 36. Rc5 f6 37. fxg6 hxg6 38. Be3 Rb7 39. Bd4 Kf7 40. Kg2 Nd6 41. Bc3 e5 42. Ra5 Nc4 43. Ra1 Rb6 44. b4 Nd6 45. Rb1 Ke6 46. Bd2 f5 47. Be3 Rb7 48. Bc5 Ne4 49. Rd1 Rc7 50. Bb6 Rc6 51. Ba7 Ra6 52. Be3 f4 53. Bc1 Ra4 54. Re1 Kf5 55. Bb2 Rxb4 56. Bxe5 f3+ 57. Kxf3 Kxe5 58. Kg4 Kf6 59. f4 Nf2+ 60. Kg3 Nd3 0–1

==== Game 8: Kasimdzhanov–Adams, ½–½ ====
Ruy Lopez, Exchange Variation (C68)
1. e4 e5 2. Nf3 Nc6 3. Bb5 a6 4. Bxc6 dxc6 5. 0-0 Qd6 6. d3 Ne7 7. Be3 Ng6 8. Nbd2 c5 9. a4 b6 10. Nc4 Qe6 11. Ng5 Qf6 12. Qh5 h6 13. Nh3 Bxh3 14. Qxh3 Bd6 15. Qg4 Rd8 16. g3 h5 17. Qe2 Qe6 18. f4 exf4 19. gxf4 Qg4+ 20. Qxg4 hxg4 21. Rae1 Kd7 22. e5 Be7 23. f5 Nh4 24. e6+ fxe6 25. Ne5+ Kc8 26. fxe6 Rdf8 27. Rf7 Bd6 28. Bg5 Nf3+ 29. Nxf3 gxf3 30. h4 Rxf7 31. exf7 Kd7 32. Re8 Rxe8 33. fxe8Q+ Kxe8 34. Kf2 Kf7 35. Kxf3 g6 36. Kg4 Ke6 37. Bd2 Be7 38. Bf4 c6 39. c4 b5 40. b3 Bf6 41. Be3 Be7 42. Bf4 Bf8 43. Kg5 Kf7 44. Kg4 Kf6 45. Bg3 Bh6 46. Bd6 Be3 47. Bg3 Ke6 48. Bc7 ½–½
