= Vladimir Malaniuk =

Ukrainian chess grandmaster (1957–2017)

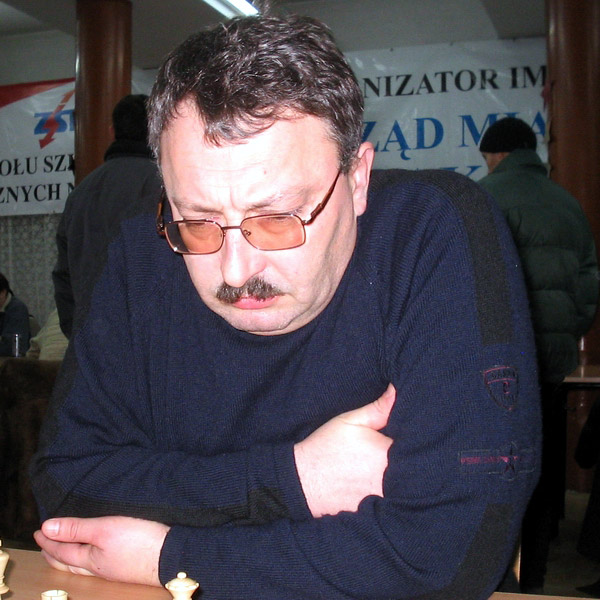
- Malaniuk in Kraków, 2006

Personal information
- Born: Volodymyr Pavlovych Malanyuk; 21 July 1957 Arkhangelsk, Russian SFSR, Soviet Union
- Died: 2 July 2017 (aged 59) Kyiv, Ukraine

Chess career
- Country: Soviet Union; Ukraine
- Title: Grandmaster (1987)
- Peak rating: 2635 (July 1993)
- Peak ranking: No. 22 (July 1983)

Vladimir Pavlovich Malaniuk (Ukrainian: Володимир Павлович Маланюк, romanized: Volodymyr Pavlovych Malanyuk; 21 July 1957 – 2 July 2017) was a Ukrainian chess grandmaster and three-time Ukrainian champion. He competed in the FIDE World Chess Championship 1998. In team events, Malaniuk played for Ukraine in three Chess Olympiads (1994, 1996, 1998), two World Team Chess Championships (1993, 1997) and 1997 European Team Chess Championship. He won team silver and bronze medals in 1996 and 1998 Chess Olympiads respectively, team silver and an individual gold medals in the 1993 World Team Championship.

== Career ==
Malaniuk was a regular participant of the Soviet Chess Championship between 1983 and 1991, his best finish occurring in 1986, when he shared second place, behind Vitaly Tseshkovsky. In Ukraine, he won the national championship on three occasions, in 1980, 1981 and 1986.

In 2005, he finished second at the Paul Keres Memorial rapid event in Tallinn, behind Alexey Shirov and ahead of Anatoly Karpov and Boris Gelfand. The same year, he took the silver medal at the 5th Amplico AIG Life International Chess Tournament - European Rapid Championship, behind Zoltan Gyimesi. In 2006, Malaniuk finished clear winner at the Ajaccio Open Rapid event, ahead of a large group of strong grandmasters, including Rustam Kasimdzhanov, Vadim Milov, Evgeny Bareev, Alexander Motylev, Victor Bologan, Zoltán Almási, Ilya Smirin, Ivan Sokolov, Arkadij Naiditsch, Krishnan Sasikiran and Loek van Wely.

Malaniuk had also been a strong player at standard time limits, winning many national and international tournaments, including Minsk 1985, Kostroma 1985 (USSR Championship semi-final), Lvov 1986 and Frunze 1987 on the road to securing his Grandmaster title (awarded in 1987). There were further victories recorded at Forlì in 1990 and 1992, Porto San Giorgio 1994, Minsk 1997 Krasnodar 2001, Arkhangelsk 2002, Krasnodar 2002, Koszalin 2002, Kolobrzeg 2003, Kraków 2003 and Mielno 2006. Notable runner-up performances include Baku 1983, Tallinn 1987, Lvov 1988, Świdnica 2001 and Kraków 2004.

== Chess opening theory ==
Malaniuk has been credited with an important contribution to chess opening theory. Along with Sergey Dolmatov, Mikhail Gurevich and Evgeny Bareev, his faithful adherence to the Leningrad Dutch Defence (described as a hybrid of the Dutch and the King's Indian) helped shape a dynamic new approach to the system in the 1980s and this led to a dramatic resurgence of interest. That it affords black the opportunity to unbalance the position and fight for the full point is probably its main attraction. The system has since become a popular choice for players at all levels, following the publication of a number of books and theoretical guides. His own book on the opening (co-authored with Petr Marusenko) was published by Chess Stars in 2014.

In a more minor capacity, he and Vladimir Akopian are noted for their attempts at reviving the Spielmann Variation (4.Qb3) of the Nimzo-Indian Defence, but have not met with any real success.

== Personal life ==
In 2001, Russian player and chess journalist Evgeny Atarov reported that Malaniuk was severely ill and was undergoing a number of surgical operations, the funding of which had become a cause for concern. Malaniuk got better and was able to resume his chess activities, even though his ailing health was making it difficult for him to play consistently.

== Sample game ==
Polugaevsky-Malaniuk, USSR Ch. 1983, Leningrad Dutch, 0-1 Black ventures forward on the kingside while carefully neutralising white's central threat.
