= Emil Sutovsky =

Israeli chess grandmaster (born 1977)

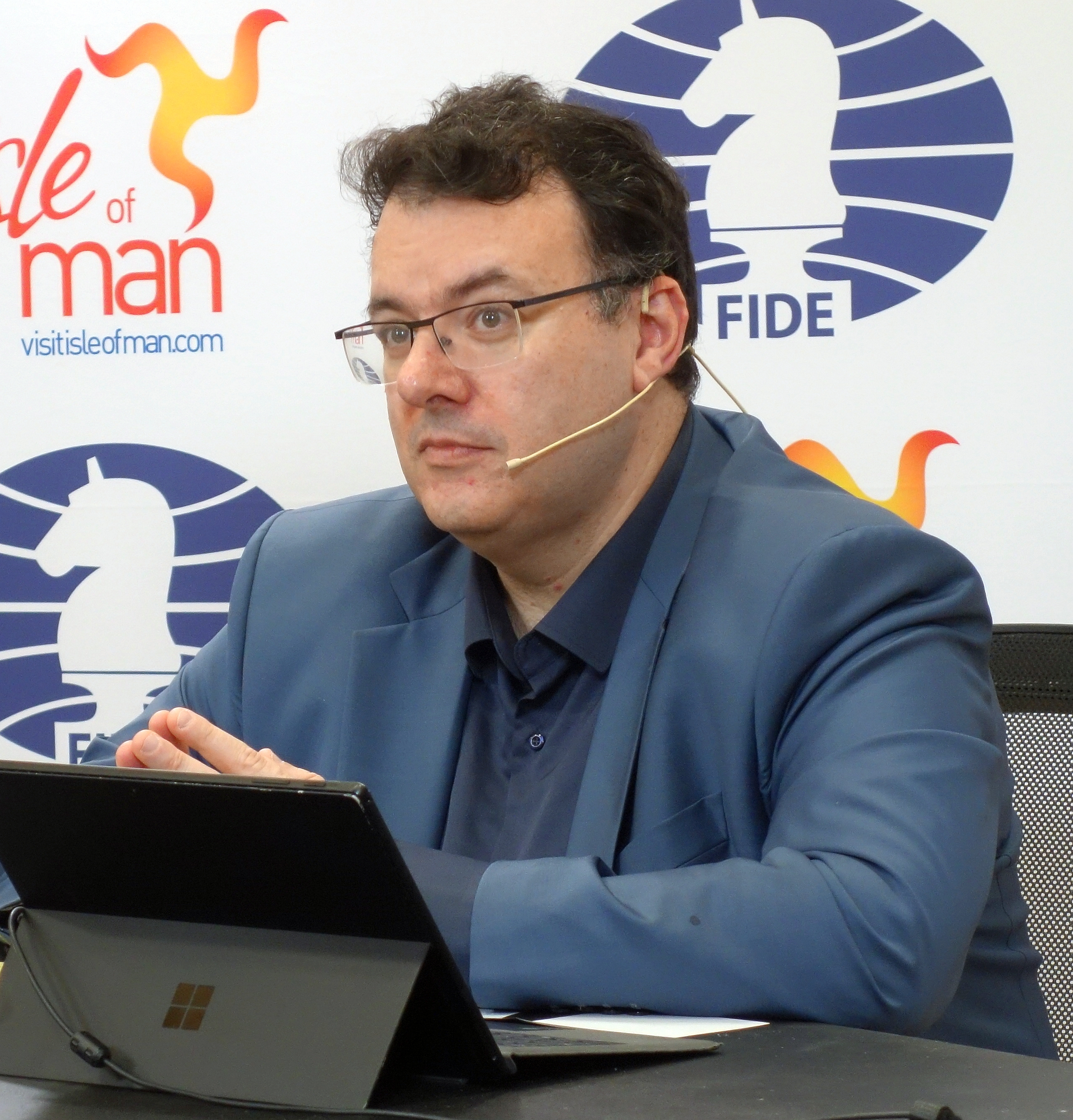
- Emil Sutovsky in 2023

Personal information
- Native name: אמיל סוטובסקי
- Born: September 19, 1977 (age 48) Baku, Azerbaijan SSR, Soviet Union

Chess career
- Country: Soviet Union (until 1991); Israel (since 1991)
- Title: Grandmaster (1996)
- FIDE rating: 2592 (July 2026)
- Peak rating: 2703 (January 2012)
- Peak ranking: No. 17 (October 2004)

Emil Davidovich Sutovsky (Hebrew: אמיל סוטובסקי; Russian: Эмиль Давидович Сутовский; Romanized: Emil’ Davidovich Sutovskiy; born 19 September 1977) is an Israeli chess player. He was awarded the title Grandmaster by FIDE in 1996. Sutovsky has been the FIDE CEO since 2022. Previously, he served as FIDE Director-General (2018-22). He was the president of the Association of Chess Professionals from 2012 to 2019.

== Successes ==
Sutovsky learned to play chess at the age of four. He achieved notable successes by winning the World Junior Chess Championship in Medellín in 1996, finishing first at the double round-robin VAM Hoogeveen Tournament in 1997 (ahead of Judit Polgár, Loek van Wely, and Vasily Smyslov) and winning Hastings 2000 (ahead of Alexey Dreev, Ivan Sokolov and Jonathan Speelman).

In 2001, Sutovsky won the European Individual Chess Championship after rapid tiebreaks with Ruslan Ponomariov.

In 2003, he tied for first with Alexander Beliavsky in the Vidmar Memorial. In 2007, he placed second at the 8th European Chess Championship, held in Dresden, following a play-off with the eventual winner GM Vladislav Tkachiev and GMs Dmitry Jakovenko and Ivan Cheparinov.

He finished tied for first in two major open tournaments in 2005: in the Gibraltar Chess Festival he scored 7.5−2.5 (the same score as Levon Aronian, Zahar Efimenko, Kiril Georgiev, and Alexei Shirov), and at the Aeroflot Open in Moscow he scored 6.5−2.5 (the same as Vasily Ivanchuk, Alexander Motylev, Andrei Kharlov, and Vladimir Akopian). His superior tie-break in the latter gave him first place (ahead of top players such as Aronian, Teimour Radjabov, Shakhriyar Mamedyarov, Ponomariov, Sergey Karjakin, et al.) and with it an invitation to the prestigious Dortmund tournament later in the year, in which he beat classical world champion Vladimir Kramnik , scoring 3.5−5.5.

Sutovsky played in three FIDE Knock-out World Championships: in 1997 he was eliminated in the first round by Gildardo García; in 2000 he was eliminated in the first round by Igor Nataf; in 2001 he was eliminated in round three by the eventual runner-up Vasyl Ivanchuk.

He did not participate in the controversial FIDE World Chess Championship 2004 because of concerns about how its host, Libya, would treat Israeli players.

He took part in Chess World Cup 2005, Chess World Cup 2007, Chess World Cup 2009 and Chess World Cup 2011 with a moderate success. In 2007, Sutovsky became a second of US Grandmaster Gata Kamsky, helping him to win the Chess World Cup 2007.

In September 2009, Sutovsky won Inventi Chess Tournament in Antwerp. In 2011, he tied for 2nd-3rd with Dmitry Andreikin in the Baku Open. After becoming the ACP President, Sutovsky started playing less often. In 2015, he won the prestigious Biel Masters Open Tournament. In 2016 he won the strong Nona 75 – ACP Open in Tbilisi. In April 2017, Sutovsky won the traditional Karpov Tournament in Poikovsky showing the performance of 2902 – statistically the best result in his entire career.

== Olympiad career ==
Sutovsky represented Israel in nine Chess Olympiads from 1996 to 2014. In the 2010 Chess Olympiad he took the gold medal for the best individual performance on board two and showed the highest TPR (Tournament Performance Rating) of 2895, among all the participants of the Olympiad.

== Playing style ==
Sutovsky's uncompromising style has attracted a lot of attention: his sacrificial victory over Ilya Smirin in the 2002 Israeli Chess Championship was voted the best game of issue 86 of Chess Informant, and his victory over Daniel Gormally at Gibraltar 2005 earned him the prize for best game. This game was highly praised by FIDE World Champion Viswanathan Anand, who picked this game as the best chess game he had ever seen. Since 2006, he has his own column − "Jeu créateur" ("Creative chess") in major French chess magazine Europe Échecs.

Sutovsky virtually always plays 1.e4 with White, occasionally testing unfashionable or old-fashioned openings such as the Two Knights Defence, the King's Gambit, and the Scotch Game. With Black, he usually plays the Grünfeld Defence or King's Indian Defence against 1.d4, and Sicilian Defence or Ruy Lopez against 1.e4.

Sutovsky speaks five languages and occasionally participates in trivia contests.

== See also ==
- List of Jewish chess players
