= Baadur Jobava =

Georgian chess grandmaster (born 1983)

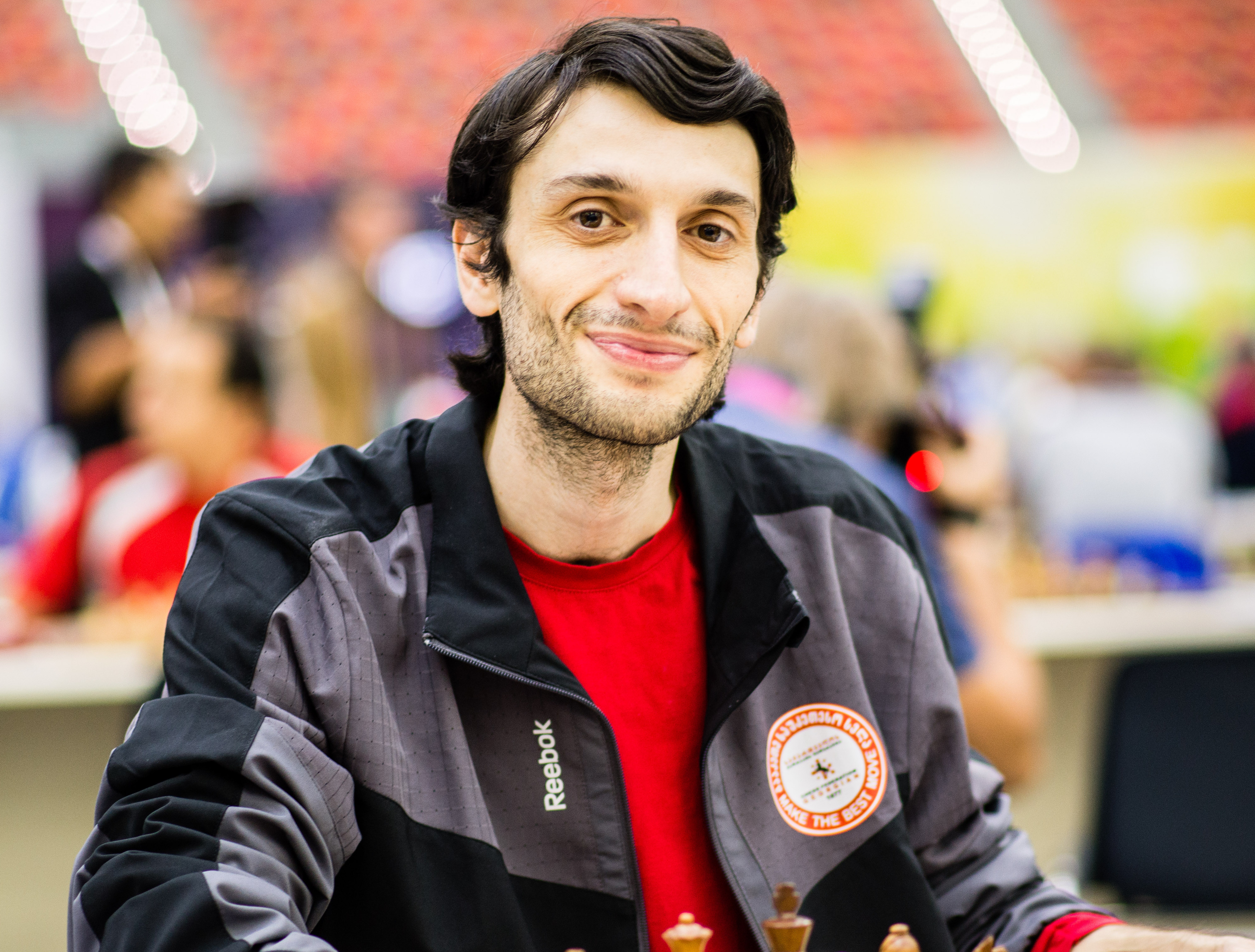
- Jobava at the 2016 Chess Olympiad

Personal information
- Born: 26 November 1983 (age 42) Gali, Georgian SSR, Soviet Union

Chess career
- Country: Georgia
- Title: Grandmaster (2001)
- FIDE rating: 2572 (July 2026)
- Peak rating: 2734 (September 2012)
- Peak ranking: No. 19 (September 2012)

Baadur Jobava (Georgian: ბაადურ ჯობავა; born 26 November 1983) is a Georgian chess grandmaster and five-time Georgian champion (2003, 2007, 2012, 2024, 2026). He competed in the FIDE World Chess Championship in 2004 and in the FIDE World Cup in 2005, 2009, 2011, 2013, 2017, where he reached round of 16 after defeating Ian Nepomniachtchi, and in 2021, 2025. He also participated in the FIDE Grand Prix 2014–15, where he finished joint 4th out of 12 participants in the Tashkent Leg after beating Sergey Karjakin. He won the individual board performance gold medals in the Chess Olympiads of 2004 and 2016.

== Career ==
Jobava won the Dubai Open in 2003 with a score of 7 points out of 9. He took part in the FIDE World Chess Championship 2004, where he was knocked out in the first round by Ruben Felgaer. He won the 2nd Samba Cup in Skanderborg, Denmark in 2005. In 2006 Jobava won the Railyaway Hotel Cup and the prestigious Aeroflot Open.

In 2008 he tied for 1st–8th with Nigel Short, Vadim Milov, Aleksej Aleksandrov, Tamaz Gelashvili, Alexander Lastin, Gadir Guseinov and Farid Abbasov in the President's Cup in Baku. Jobava won the silver medal in the European Individual Championship 2010, held in Rijeka. In August 2011 he tied for 1st–2nd with Hrant Melkumyan in the Lake Sevan tournament in Martuni and won the event on tie-break. In December 2011, he won the 32nd Edoardo Crespi Trophy in Milan with 8½/9, finishing two points ahead of second placed Vladimir Malaniuk. In the same month Jobava won the European Rapid Chess Championship in Warsaw ahead of 746 players.

In January 2014, Jobava finished equal second and third on tiebreak in the Tata Steel Challengers tournament in Wijk aan Zee scoring 8½/13. In the following month, he won the David Bronstein Memorial in Minsk on tiebreak over Sergey Fedorchuk and Mikhailo Oleksienko. In July he finished second behind Wesley So at the ACP Golden Classic in Bergamo, Italy. In August, 2015, he took clear first place in the 19th HZ Chess Tournament in Vlissingen, the Netherlands, scoring 8/9 points (+7−0=2). In 2017 Jobava tied for first with Maxim Matlakov and Vladimir Fedoseev in the European Individual Championship in Minsk, taking the silver medal on tiebreak. In 2019, Jobava took clear first place in Abu Dhabi Masters scoring 8/9 points and 2904 performance rating.

Jobava has a (+2−2=3) record against Magnus Carlsen, a (+2−1=3) record against Sergey Karjakin, a (+1−1=3) record against Ian Nepomniachtchi, a (+4−0=1) record against Leinier Domínguez and a (+2−0=2) record against Teimour Radjabov. Jobava won the match against Radoslaw Wojtaszek in 2012 with a 5-3 score and has an overall (+5−1=5) record.

Jobava won 4 out of the first 6 Titled Tuesday blitz events held on Chess.com and streams similar tournaments alongside casual games on Twitch to his 20,000 followers under the username "JamesBlunder".

Jobava is considered one of the most prolific users of Larsen's Opening in the modern era, having beaten Yu Yangyi in the Tata Steel Challengers 2014, Daniil Dubov in the Bronstein Memorial 2014, Shakhriyar Mamedyarov in the FIDE Grand Prix 2015 and David Howell in the FIDE Grand Swiss 2019 with it.

=== Team competitions ===
Jobava has played for the Georgian national team in the Chess Olympiad since 2000. He won the individual gold medal in 2004, scoring 8½/10 points. In 2010, he defeated the world's number one player Magnus Carlsen in the Georgia–Norway match. In 2016, he won the individual gold medal for the best first board performance, which included wins over Richárd Rapport, Francisco Vallejo Pons and the former FIDE world champions Ruslan Ponomariov and Veselin Topalov with a performance rating of 2926 which is the highest performance rating for board 1 since Garry Kasparov's 2933 performance rating in 2002.

== Jobava London ==
Although the line had first been played by James Mason in 1882, Jobava is credited with popularizing an opening now known as the Jobava London System (also known as the Rapport–Jobava System). Characterized by the moves 1.d4, 2.Nc3, and 3.Bf4, Jobava successfully employed the opening to score wins against Veselin Topalov and Ruslan Ponomariov.

== Xu Xiangyu controversy ==
On February 3, 2023, Jobava accused GM Xu Xiangyu of cheating after losing to him during the Airthings Masters Play-In and publicly berated Chess.com team members after the game saying "Ban all these Chinese motherf***ers [sic]." This resulted in him being banned from all Chess.com prize events for the remainder of 2023 for the alleged racism.

== Personal life ==
Jobava's younger brother Beglar is a chess International Master.

== Notable games ==
Jobava vs. Bareev, Rethymnon 2003

Position: b8 black rook, e8 black rook, f8 black king, a7 black pawn, c7 black bishop, f7 black pawn, h6 white pawn, b5 black knight, c5 black pawn, d5 white rook, f5 white knight, g5 white knight, d3 white king, a2 white pawn, c2 white pawn, f2 white pawn, g2 white pawn, h1 white rook

Final position
- Baadur Jobava vs.Evgeny Bareev, European Club Cup 2003
  1.e4 c6 2.d4 d5 3.Nd2 dxe4 4.Nxe4 Bf5 5.Ng3 Bg6 6.h4 h6 7.Nf3 Nd7 8.h5 Bh7 9.Bd3 Bxd3 10.Qxd3 Ngf6 11.Bd2 e6 12.0-0-0 Be7 13.Qe2 0-0 14.Kb1 c5 15.d5 exd5 16.Bxh6 gxh6 17.Nf5 Re8 18.Nxh6+ Kf8 19.Ng5 Qb6 20.Qf3 Ne5 21.Qg3 Bd6 22.Nf5 Qxb2+ 23.Kxb2 Nc4+ 24.Kb3 Bxg3 25.h6 Na5+ 26.Ka4 b5+ 27.Kxa5 Bc7+ 28.Kxb5 Rab8+ 29.Ka4 Ne4 30.Rxd5 Nc3+ 31.Ka3 Nb5+ 32.Kb2 Nd4+ 33.Kc3 Nb5+ 34.Kd3 1–0
- Baadur Jobava vs.Magnus Carlsen, Chess Olympiad 2010
  1.d4 Nf6 2.c4 e6 3.Nc3 Bb4 4.a3 Bxc3+ 5.bxc3 Nc6 6.e4 Nxe4 7.Qg4 f5 8.Qxg7 Qf6 9.Qxf6 Nxf6 10.Nf3 b6 11.d5 Na5 12.Nd4 Kf7 13.dxe6+ dxe6 14.Bf4 Ba6 15.Nf3 Ne4 16.Ne5+ Kf6 17.f3 Nd6 18.0-0-0 Rhd8 19.h4 Nf7 20.Nd7+ Kg7 21.Rh3 Kh8 22.Bg5 Nxg5 23.hxg5 Kg7 24.Rh6 Bxc4 25.Bxc4 Nxc4 26.Rdh1 Rh8 27.f4 c5 28.Rxe6 Rae8 29.Rxh7+ Rxh7 30.Rxe8 Kf7 31.Ra8 Rh1+ 32.Kc2 a5 33.Ra7 Nxa3+ 34.Kd2 Rh2 35.Nxb6+ Kg6 36.Rxa5 Rxg2+ 37.Kd1 Nb1 38.Rxc5 Nd2 39.Nd5 Ne4 40.Rc6+ Kf7 41.Ne3 Rg3 42.Ke2 Ke8 43.Re6+ Kf7 44.Re5 Nxc3+ 45.Kf2 Rh3 46.Rxf5+ Kg6 47.Rf6+ Kg7 48.Nf5+ Kg8 49.Kg2 Rd3 50.Rd6 Ne2 51.Rg6+ Kh8 52.Rh6+ Kg8 53.Ne7+ Kf7 54.Ng6 Kg7 55.Kf2 Nc3 56.Ne7 Ne4+ 57.Ke2 Ra3 58.Nf5+ Kg8 59.Re6 Nc3+ 60.Kf3 Nd5+ 61.Kg4 Ra1 62.Re5 Rg1+ 63.Kf3 Rf1+ 64.Kg2 1–0
- Sergey Karjakin vs.Baadur Jobava, FIDE Grand Prix Tashkent 2014
  1.e4 c6 2.Nf3 d5 3.Nc3 dxe4 4.Nxe4 Nf6 5.Nxf6+ exf6 6.Bc4 Qe7+ 7.Be2 Qc7 8.d4 Bd6 9.0-0 0-0 10.h3 Rd8 11.Be3 Nd7 12.c4 Nf8 13.Bd3 Ng6 14.Qc2 Be6 15.Rfe1 Qd7 16.Bd2 Bxh3 17.gxh3 Qxh3 18.Bxg6 hxg6 19.Re3 g5 20.c5 Bf4 21.Rb3 Bc7 22.Qc4 Qh5 23.Kg2 Qg4+ 24.Kf1 Re8 25.Re1 Qh3+ 26.Kg1 Rxe1+ 27.Bxe1 Qg4+ 28.Kf1 Re8 29.Ng1 Bh2 30.Ne2 Rxe2 31.Rxb7 Re6 0–1
