= Alexander Lastin =

Russian chess grandmaster (1976-2015)

Personal information
- Born: 30 November 1976 Arkhangelsk, Russian SFSR, Soviet Union
- Died: 23 January 2015 (aged 38) Zheleznovodsk, Russia

Chess career
- Country: Russia
- Title: Grandmaster (1997)
- Peak rating: 2659 (January 2010)
- Peak ranking: No. 47 (October 2000)

Alexander Nikolaevich Lastin (Russian: Александр Ластин; 30 November 1976 – 23 January 2015) was a Russian chess player. He was awarded the title of Grandmaster by FIDE in 1997.

Lastin was born in Arkhangelsk and at three years old he moved to Zheleznovodsk. In 2001 he tied for first with Alexander Motylev in the Russian Chess Championship and finished second on tiebreak. Lastin won it in 2002.

Lastin competed in the FIDE World Chess Championship 2002, where he was eliminated by Zhang Zhong in round two, after knocking out Ognjen Cvitan in the first. At the FIDE World Chess Championship 2004 he reached the third round, where he lost to Hikaru Nakamura and therefore was eliminated from the tournament. In March 2005 Lastin finished second at the Moscow Open. Later that year, he placed equal second (third on tiebreak) in the 9th Voronezh Open. and won the 7th Kuban Championship - Stepanov Memorial in Sochi.

Lastin took clear first place in the Moscow Open 2006 scoring 7½ points out of 9. In June 2007 he won the V.K.Doroshkevich Memorial tournament in Belorechensk. He tied for first in 2008 and in 2009. In the 2007 Voronezh Open he tied for first, placing second on tiebreak.

In 2008 he tied for 1st–8th places with Nigel Short, Vadim Milov, Aleksej Aleksandrov, Tamaz Gelashvili, Baadur Jobava, Gadir Guseinov and Farid Abbasov in the President's Cup in Baku. At the Moscow Open 2008 he tied for second, finishing fifth on countback. In September 2008 Lastin placed fourth in the Russian Championship Higher League and qualified for the Superfinal of the Russian Championship, where he scored 5/11. In 2013 Lastin won the Dombay Open edging out Artur Gabrielian on tiebreak.

He died on 23 January 2015 in Zheleznovodsk.

== Notable games ==
Nepomniachtchi vs. Lastin, Ulan-Ude 2009

Position: h1 white king, f1 white bishop, g2 white pawn, f2 black queen, h3 white pawn, f3 white knight, a3 white pawn, b4 white queen, h6 black pawn, f6 black pawn, e6 black pawn, d6 black bishop, c6 black bishop, g7 black pawn, e7 black king, a7 black pawn

Final position

Russian Championship Higher League 2009, Round 4

Ian Nepomniachtchi (2632) vs. Alexander Lastin (2648)

1. e4 c6 2. d4 d5 3. exd5 cxd5 4. c4 Nf6 5. Nc3 e6 6. Nf3 Bb4 7. cxd5 Nxd5 8. Qc2 Nc6 9. a3 Be7 10. Bd3 Bf6 11. Be3 h6 12. Ne4 Qa5+ 13. Ke2 O-O 14. Rac1 Bd7 15. Nc5 Qc7 16. Qd2 Rfd8 17. Bb1 Be8 18. Qd3 Nf4+ 19. Bxf4 Qxf4 20. Qh7+ Kf8 21. Nd3 Nxd4+ 22. Nxd4 Qxd4 23. Rc7 Rd7 24. Rhc1 Rad8 25. Kf1 Qd6 26. Rxd7 Bxd7 27. Kg1 Bb5 28. Rd1 Bxb2 29. h3 Bf6 30. Nb2 Qc7 31. Rxd8+ Qxd8 32. Bd3 Bc6 33. Nc4 Qd4 34. Bf1 Qc5 35. Qh8+ Ke7 36. Qc8 Bd4 37. Qc7+ Bd7 38. Qxb7 Bxf2+ 39. Kh1 Bg3 40. Qb2 f6 41. Nd2 Bc6 42. Nf3 Qf2 43. Qb4+ Bd6 0-1

Preceded by Alexander Motylev	Russian Chess Champion; 2002	Succeeded by Peter Svidler
