= Tamaz Gelashvili =

Georgian chess grandmaster (born 1978)

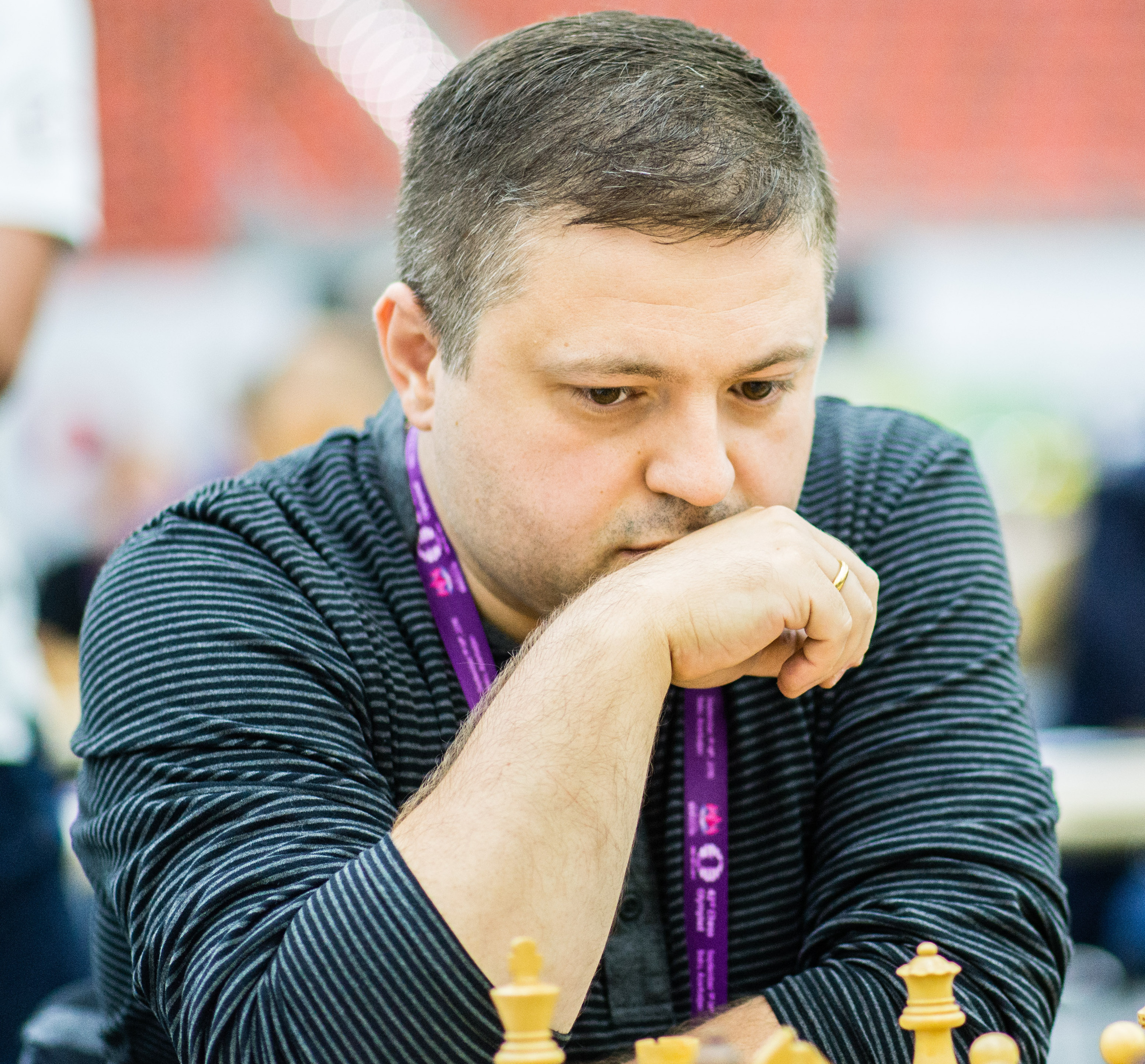

Personal information
- Born: April 8, 1978 (age 48) Georgian Soviet Socialist Republic, USSR

Chess career
- Country: Georgia
- Title: Grandmaster (1999)
- FIDE rating: 2541 (July 2026)
- Peak rating: 2623 (October 2007)

Tamaz Gelashvili (Georgian: თამაზ გელაშვილი; born 8 April 1978) is a Georgian chess grandmaster.

== Career ==
He was awarded the Grandmaster title in 1999. His highest FIDE rating has been 2623, achieved in October 2007. His national ranking is fourth and he has played for his country at several Olympiads. In 2001 he tied for 1st with Yannick Pelletier, Mark Hebden and Vladimir Tukmakov in the 9th Neuchâtel Open and in 2006 won the Acropolis International tournament in Athens. In 2008 he tied for 2nd with Giorgi Bagaturov in the Gyumri International tournament and tied for 1st with Nigel Short, Vadim Milov, Aleksej Aleksandrov, Baadur Jobava, Alexander Lastin, Gadir Guseinov and Farid Abbasov in the President's Cup in Baku. In 2011 he won the 5th Annual Philadelphia Open.

He is noted for playing some unusual opening variations, such as 2.b3 in response to the Sicilian, French and Caro–Kann Defences.
