= Abobker Mohamed Elarabi =

Libyan chess player (born 1973)

Personal information
- Born: 6 February 1973 (age 53)

Chess career
- Country: Libya
- Title: FIDE Master (2013)
- Peak rating: 2372 (April 2003)
- Sports career
- Height: 193 cm (6 ft 4 in)
- Weight: 110 kg (243 lb)

Abobker Mohamed Elarabi (born 6 February 1973) is a Libyan chess FIDE Master (2013), Chess Olympiad individual medalist (2002), three-time Libyan Chess Championship winner (2012, 2016, 2018).

== Chess career ==
Abobker Mohamed Elarabi is a three-time Libyan Chess Championship winner: 2012, 2016, and 2018.

Abobker Mohamed Elarabi participated many times in African Chess Championships and Arab Chess Championships. His best result in these tournaments was 7th place in African Chess Championship in 2019, in Hammamet. He won individual silver medal in 2007 Arab Games.

In 2004, in Tripoli Abobker Mohamed Elarabi participated in single-elimination FIDE World Chess Championship. In 1st round Russian Grandmaster Alexander Morozevich withdraw for tournament, but in 2nd round he lost to another Russian Grandmaster Pavel Smirnov.

In 2021, in Sochi Abobker Mohamed Elarabi participated in single-elimination Chess World Cup and in 1st round lost to Russian Grandmaster Alexander Motylev.

Abobker Mohamed Elarabi played for Libya in the Chess Olympiads:

- In 2002, at first reserve board in the 35th Chess Olympiad in Bled (+7, =0, -1) and won individual bronze medal,
- In 2004, at third board in the 36th Chess Olympiad in Calvià (+5, =3, -3),
- In 2006, at third board in the 37th Chess Olympiad in Turin (+6, =0, -6),
- In 2012, at first board in the 40th Chess Olympiad in Istanbul (+5, =0, -5),
- In 2014, at first board in the 41st Chess Olympiad in Tromsø (+6, =2, -3),
- In 2016, at first board in the 42nd Chess Olympiad in Baku (+5, =4, -1).

In 2013, he was awarded the FIDE Master (FM) title.
