= Valery Filippov =

Russian chess grandmaster (born 1975)

Personal information
- Born: 28 November 1975 (age 50)

Chess career
- Country: Russia
- Title: Grandmaster (1996)
- FIDE rating: 2553 (July 2026)
- Peak rating: 2639 (April 2004)
- Peak ranking: No. 53 (April 2001)

Valery Filippov (Russian: Валерий Владимирович Филиппов; born 28 November 1975) is a Russian Grandmaster (GM) (1996).

== Biography ==
Valery Filippov began to achieve significant successes in chess tournaments in the mid-1990s. In 1997, he shared the 2nd place in the Russian Chess Cup final, and in 1998 he took in this tournament 3rd place. In 2000, in Varna Valery Filippov won Academic World Chess Championship, won in Carlos Torre Repetto Memorial in Mérida and in Chigorin Memorial in Saint Petersburg. In 2001, in Kazan he shared 1st place in the Russian Chess Cup final. In 2002, Valery Filippov won Carlos Torre Repetto Memorial for the second time in his career. In 2004, he achieved one of the greatest successes in his career, winning (together with Sergei Rublevsky and Rafael Vaganian) in Aeroflot Open in Moscow. In this same year in Tripoli Valery Filippov also appeared in the FIDE World Chess Championship single-elimination tournament, reaching the third round (in the first two he beat Daniel Cámpora and Loek van Wely, and in the third he lost to Alexander Grischuk).

Valery Filippov played for Russia "B" team in the Chess Olympiad:

- In 1998, at second board in the 33rd Chess Olympiad in Elista (+5, =5, -2).

Valery Filippov played for Russia in the European Team Chess Championship:

- In 1999, at first board in the 12th European Team Chess Championship in Batumi (+1, =3, -3).

In 1996, Valery Filippov was awarded the FIDE Grandmaster (GM) title.
