= Leonid Kritz =

Russian-German chess grandmaster (born 1984)

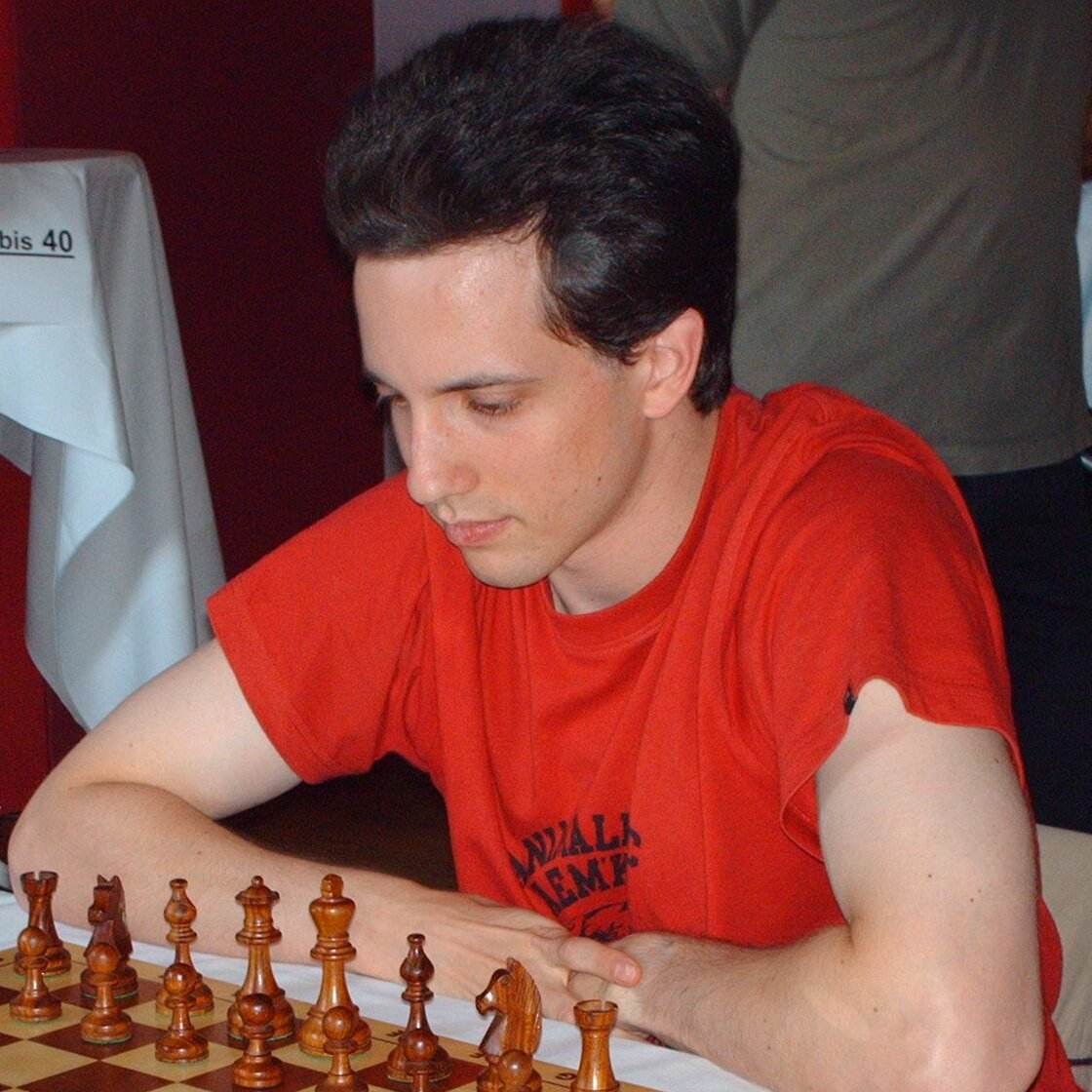
- Kritz in 2007

Personal information
- Born: February 26, 1984 (age 42) Moscow, Russian SFSR, Soviet Union
- Spouse: Nadezhda Kosintseva (m. 2012; div. 2018)

Chess career
- Country: Russia (until 1999); Germany (since 1999)
- Title: Grandmaster (2003)
- FIDE rating: 2568 (November 2026)
- Peak rating: 2624 (September 2010)

Leonid Kritz is a Russian-German chess grandmaster.

== Chess career ==
Leonid Kritz was born in Moscow, Russia, where he began learning chess from his father at the age of 4. After showing significant improvement, he was admitted to the Chess School of Olympic Reserve named after the 9th world champion Tigran Petrosian. He received education from the top Russian coaches and capitalized on it in full - winning Y10 and Y12 Moscow championships and scoring second at the Y10 Russian championship in 1994.

Leonid's success story continued after his family immigrated to Germany in the fall 1996. Three years in a row he was winning German youth championships and in 1999 became the first Y16 World Champion in German history. Afterwards, he began training under Josif Dorfman., former assistant to the 13th world champion Garry Kasparov. Under Dorfman's supervision, Leonid achieved the title of International Master, and two years later, at the age of 19, became then second-youngest German grandmaster.

In the same year he qualified for the FIDE World Chess Championship 2004 held in Tripoli, Lybia where he knocked out in the first round Krishnan Sasikiran - one of the tournament's favorites. These achievements earned him a long-awaited nomination into the German national team. Between 2004 and 2007 Leonid represented Germany at multiple international competitions including 36th Chess Olympiad.

During his visit to the USA in 2007, Kritz won the New England Masters tournament. At the same time he was offered a Coca-Cola Chess Scholarship at University of Maryland, Baltimore County. One year later he joined UMBC team and led it as the captain to multiple victories in Pan-American Championships and Final Four events.

In September 2008, Kritz tied for first in the 2nd SPICE (Susan Polgar Institute for Chess Excellence) Cup with Pentala Harikrishna, Alexander Onischuk, and Varuzhan Akobian.

== Personal life ==
In 2012 Leonid completed his dual bachelor's degree in mathematics and financial economics. After that he joined the University of Texas at Dallas for Master's degree in finance, where he again received chess scholarship and captained the UTD team for the next two years. After finishing his degree, Leonid worked for Milliman in Chicago, IL, Acadian Asset Management in Boston, MA, and Quantix Commodities in Greenwich, CT. Leonid transferred successfully his skills acquired through a professional chess career to the field of quantitative finance where he works as a quantitative developer and analyst.

== Entrepreneurship ==
In 2022, Leonid Kritz and grandmaster Eugene Perelshteyn founded an after-school chess program, Four Knights Chess Academy, that operates in Massachusetts and serves many local schools. The program was designed with a strong emphasis on developing kids' analytical and problem-solving skills and received multiple accolades from public and private schools in the area.

Kritz is an experienced coach who helped multiple of his students in recent years to achieve National Master titles and win national championships.
