= Péter Ács =

Hungarian chess grandmaster (born 1981)

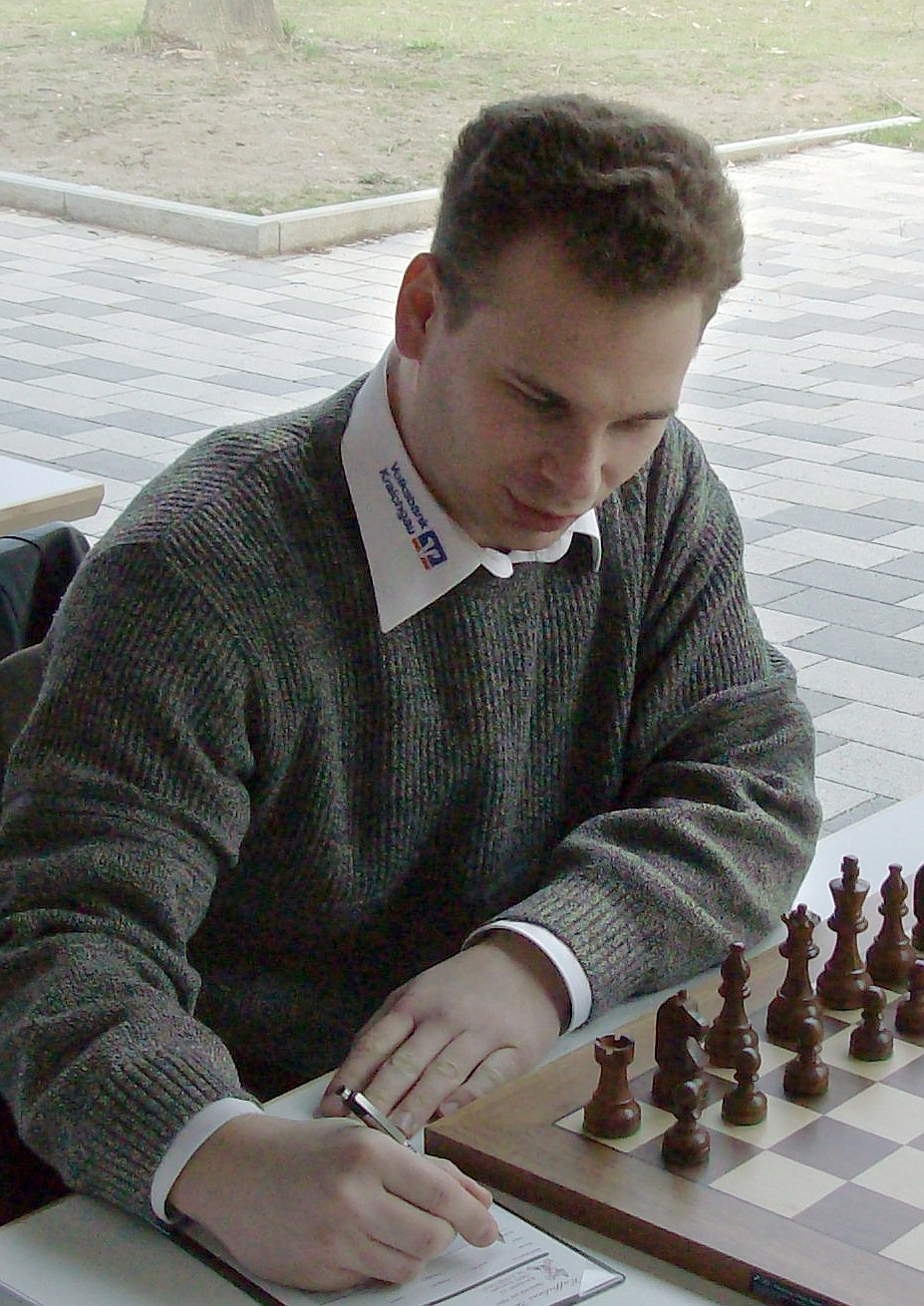

Personal information
- Born: 10 May 1981 (age 45) Eger, Hungary

Chess career
- Country: Hungary
- Title: Grandmaster (1998)
- FIDE rating: 2561 (July 2026)
- Peak rating: 2623 (January 2003)
- Peak ranking: No. 72 (January 2003)

Péter Ács (born 10 May 1981 in Eger, Hungary) is a Hungarian chess grandmaster (GM). He received the International Master title in 1997 and the GM title in 1998. In 2001, he won the World Junior Chess Championship. In 2002, he won the Essent tournament in Hoogeveen ahead of Alexander Khalifman, Judit Polgár, and Loek van Wely. He has represented Hungary at the 2000, 2002, and 2004 Chess Olympiads.

His best results include: 3rd at the World U16 Championship; 1st at the First Saturday in Budapest 1997; 1st at the First Saturday in Budapest 1998; 1st at Budapest 1999; 1st at Essent 2002; 2nd at Pardubice 2002; 1st at the György Marx Memorial in Paks 2007.

Ács reached his peak Elo rating of 2623 on the January 2003 FIDE World Rankings.
