= Vladimir Akopian =

Armenian chess grandmaster (born 1971)

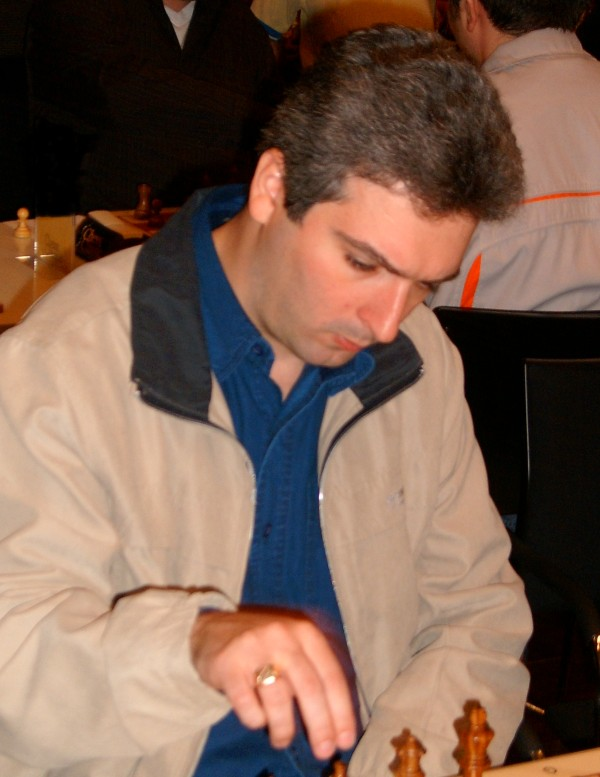

Personal information
- Born: Վլադիմիր Հակոբյան; December 7, 1971 (age 54) Baku, Azerbaijan Soviet Socialist Republic, Soviet Union

Chess career
- Country: Soviet Union (until 1991); Armenia (1991–2021); United States (since 2021)
- Title: Grandmaster (1991)
- FIDE rating: 2562 (October 2026)
- Peak rating: 2713 (July 2006)
- Peak ranking: No. 11 (January 2003)

Vladimir Eduardovich Akopian (Russian: Владимир Акопян, Armenian: Վլադիմիր Հակոբյան; born December 7, 1971) is an Armenian-American chess Grandmaster.

== Career ==
Akopian was born in Baku, Azerbaijan Soviet Socialist Republic, Soviet Union.

He achieved early international success, winning world youth titles across three different age groups. At age 14, he won the 1986 World Under-16 Championship in Rio Gallegos, Argentina. He followed this victory by winning the World Under-18 Championship in 1989, and concluded his junior career by winning the World Junior Chess Championship (Under-20) in Mamaia, Romania, in 1991.

Akopian won two consecutive Armenian Chess Championships in 1996 and 1997.

In 1999, he made his way through to the finals of the FIDE knockout World Chess Championship, having defeated Maia Chiburdanidze, Rogelio Antonio Jr., Evgeny Bareev, Kiril Georgiev, Sergei Movsesian, and Michael Adams along the way, but eventually losing to Alexander Khalifman by a score of 2½–3½.

During the Russia vs the Rest of the World match in 2002, Akopian defeated world No. 1 Garry Kasparov in 25 moves in the eighth round of the tournament.

In the opening round of the 2004 Corus chess tournament in Wijk aan Zee, Akopian defeated World Champion Vladimir Kramnik, taking an early lead in the event.

He made it to the quarterfinals of the FIDE World Chess Championship 2004, where he lost to eventual tournament runner-up Michael Adams.

In 2005, he tied for 1st–5th with Emil Sutovsky, Andrei Kharlov, Vassily Ivanchuk, and Alexander Motylev at the Aeroflot Open in Moscow with a score of 6.5/9.

Akopian had to withdraw from the 2005 Dubai Open when he was detained at the Dubai International Airport, having been mistaken for his namesake wanted by Interpol for attempted murder.

Early in 2007, Akopian won the Gibtelecom Masters in Gibraltar with a score of 7.5/9 ahead of a group of players tied at 7/9 including Michael Adams and Hikaru Nakamura.

Akopian came in third place at the Fourth FIDE Grand Prix in April 2009 with a score of 7.5/13, one point behind compatriot Levon Aronian. He lost to Peter Leko, who had the same score, in a tiebreaker.

In December 2009, he was awarded the title of "Honored Master of Sport of the Republic of Armenia".

On the May 2013 FIDE list, Akopian achieved an Elo rating of 2705, making him number 39 in the world and Armenia's number two player, behind Levon Aronian.

In 2021, he switched federations to represent the United States of America.

In 2024, Akopian won the U.S. Senior Chess Championship with a round to spare, scoring 7 points out of 9. He was the only undefeated player in the tournament. Akopian won his second U.S. Senior Championship title in 2026. After tying for first place with Alexander Onischuk at 6.5/9 in the main event, the two went to playoffs. They tied 1–1 in the rapid portion of the match before Akopian went on to win two additional blitz games to claim a 3–1 match victory.

== Team competitions ==
The Armenia national chess team made its debut at the 30th Chess Olympiad in 1992 in Manila and won bronze. Akopian played on second board at the Olympiad, behind Rafael Vaganian.

Akopian was one of the contributing players on the Armenian chess team which won gold at the 2006 Turin Chess Olympiad ahead of second-placed China and third-placed United States. Akopian played on board two at the Olympiad.

Armenia won the 38th Chess Olympiad in Dresden (2008), winning gold for the second time in a row. Akopian played on board two. Armenian President Serzh Sargsyan attended the Olympiad to support the team. After the Olympiad, they flew back to Armenia on the presidential plane, Air Force Armenia One.

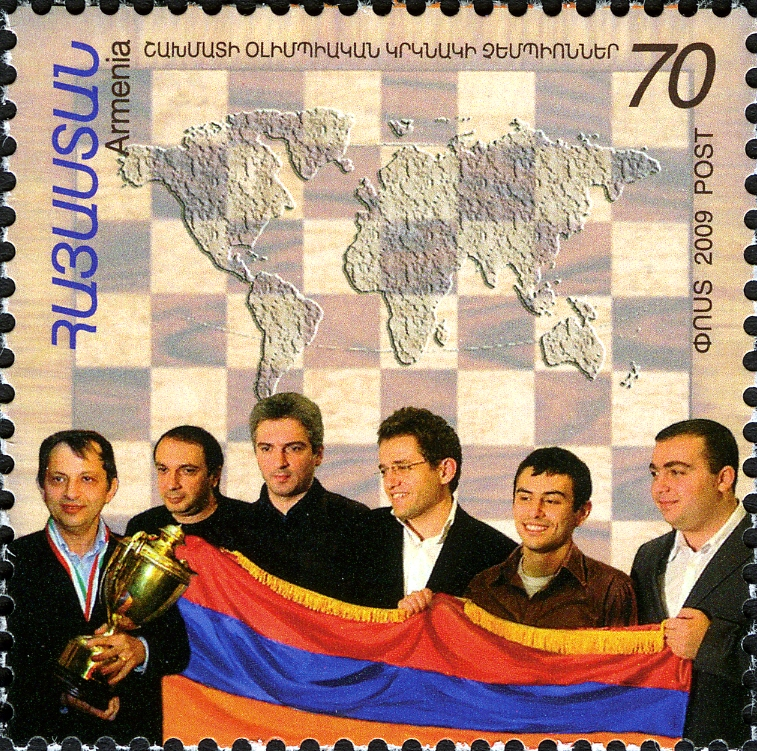
Vladimir Akopian (third from left) with his 2008 Dresden Olympiad teammates on a 2009 stamp of Armenia

Armenia regained their title at the 40th Chess Olympiad in Istanbul (2012). This was the third time Armenia won gold at the Olympiad. Akopian played on the third board. As the players were awarded their gold medals, the Armenian national anthem Mer Hayrenik was played, and the Armenian flag was raised in Istanbul. Levon Aronian held up an Armenian flag as he and his team stood on the first place podium. Upon returning to Yerevan, the players were greeted with a ceremony attended by many people in the city the moment their airplane touched down in Zvartnots Airport.

After the 40th Olympiad, Akopian revealed that he is unsure if he will ever compete at Chess Olympiads again.

He was a member of the gold medal-winning Armenian team at the World Team Chess Championship held in Ningbo (2011). It was the first time that the Armenian team won this event. Akopian played on board three.

== Notable games ==
- Mikhail Tal vs Vladimir Akopian, Barcelona 1992, Sicilian Defense: Nezhmetdinov-Rossolimo Attack (B30), 1-0
- Vladimir Akopian vs Garry Kasparov, 11th European Club Cup Final 1995, Neo-Grünfeld Defense: Classical Variation. Modern Defense (D78), 1/2-1/2
- Vladimir Akopian vs Garry Kasparov, Russia vs The Rest of the World 2002, Sicilian Defense: Nyezhmetdinov-Rossolimo Attack (B30), 1-0
- Vladimir Akopian vs Vladimir Kramnik, Corus Group A 2004, Sicilian Defense: Najdorf Variation. English Attack Anti-English (B90), 1-0
- Anatoly Karpov vs Vladimir Akopian, Russian Club Cup 2006, Slav Defense: Quiet Variation. Schallopp Defense (D12), 0-1
- Vladimir Akopian vs Maxime Vachier-Lagrave, 38th Chess Olympiad 2008, Sicilian Defense: Najdorf Variation. English Attack (B90), 1-0
- Vladimir Akopian vs Sergey Karjakin, FIDE Grand Prix 2009, Sicilian Defense: Najdorf Variation. English Attack Anti-English (B90), 1-0
- Ivan Sokolov vs Vladimir Akopian, 40th Chess Olympiad 2012, Slav Defense: General (D10), 0-1
