= Neelotpal Das =

Indian chess grandmaster (born 1982)

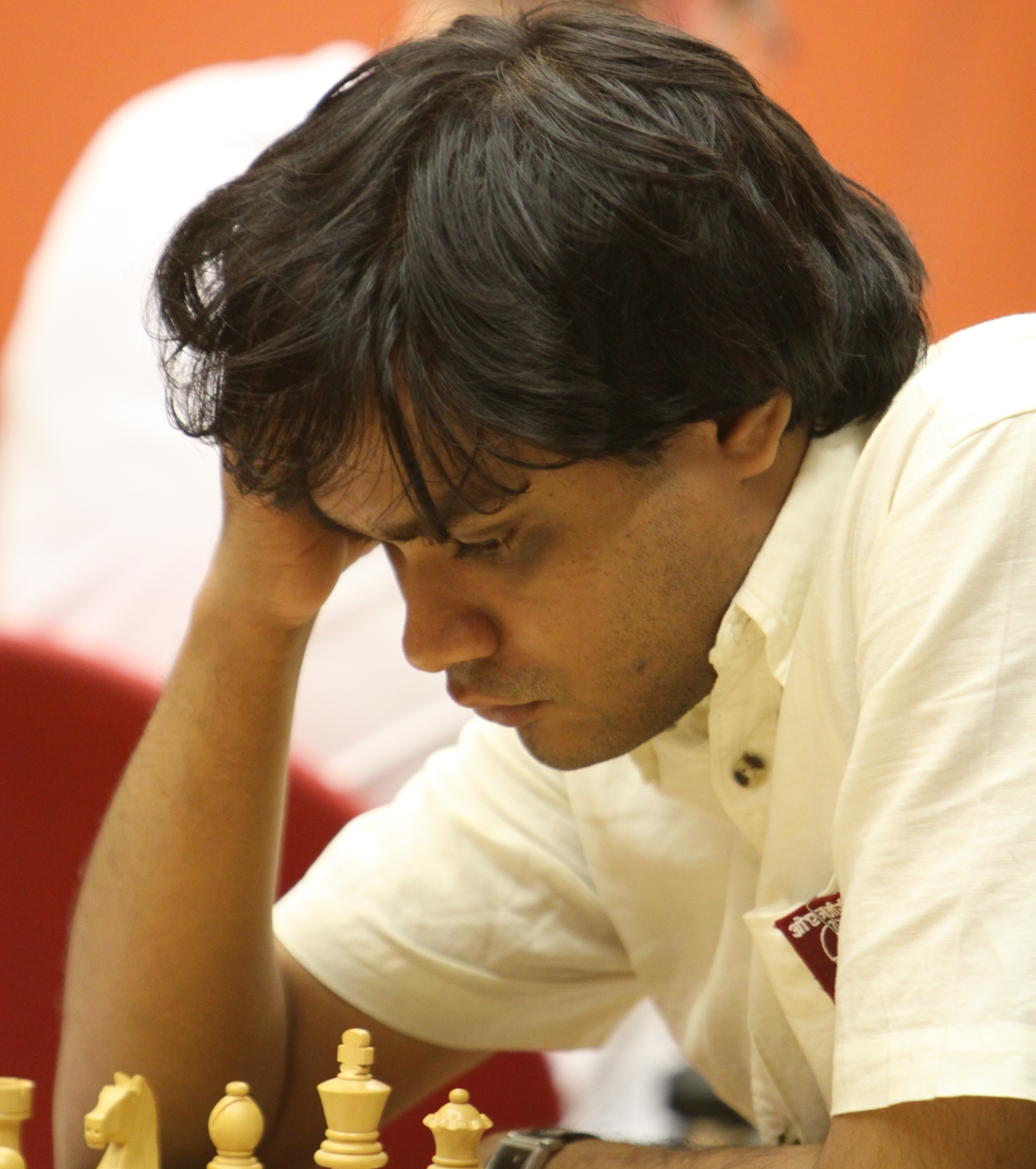
- Neelotpal in 2011

Personal information
- Born: 20 April 1982 (age 44) Kolkata, India

Chess career
- Country: India
- Title: Grandmaster (2006)
- Peak rating: 2514 (April 2006)

Neelotpal Das (born 20 April 1982) is an Indian chess grandmaster.

== Career ==
In April 2016, he finished in joint second at the Karpos Open. At the event, he defeated higher-rated players Nikola Djukić and Zdenko Kožul.

In April 2022, he was the sole leader of the Gujarat International GM Open after defeating the tournament's highest-rated player Neuris Delgado Ramírez in the eighth round. He ultimately finished second at the event, losing to Ortik Nigmatov after drawing against him in the final round.
