= Alexey Dreev =

Russian chess grandmaster (born 1969)

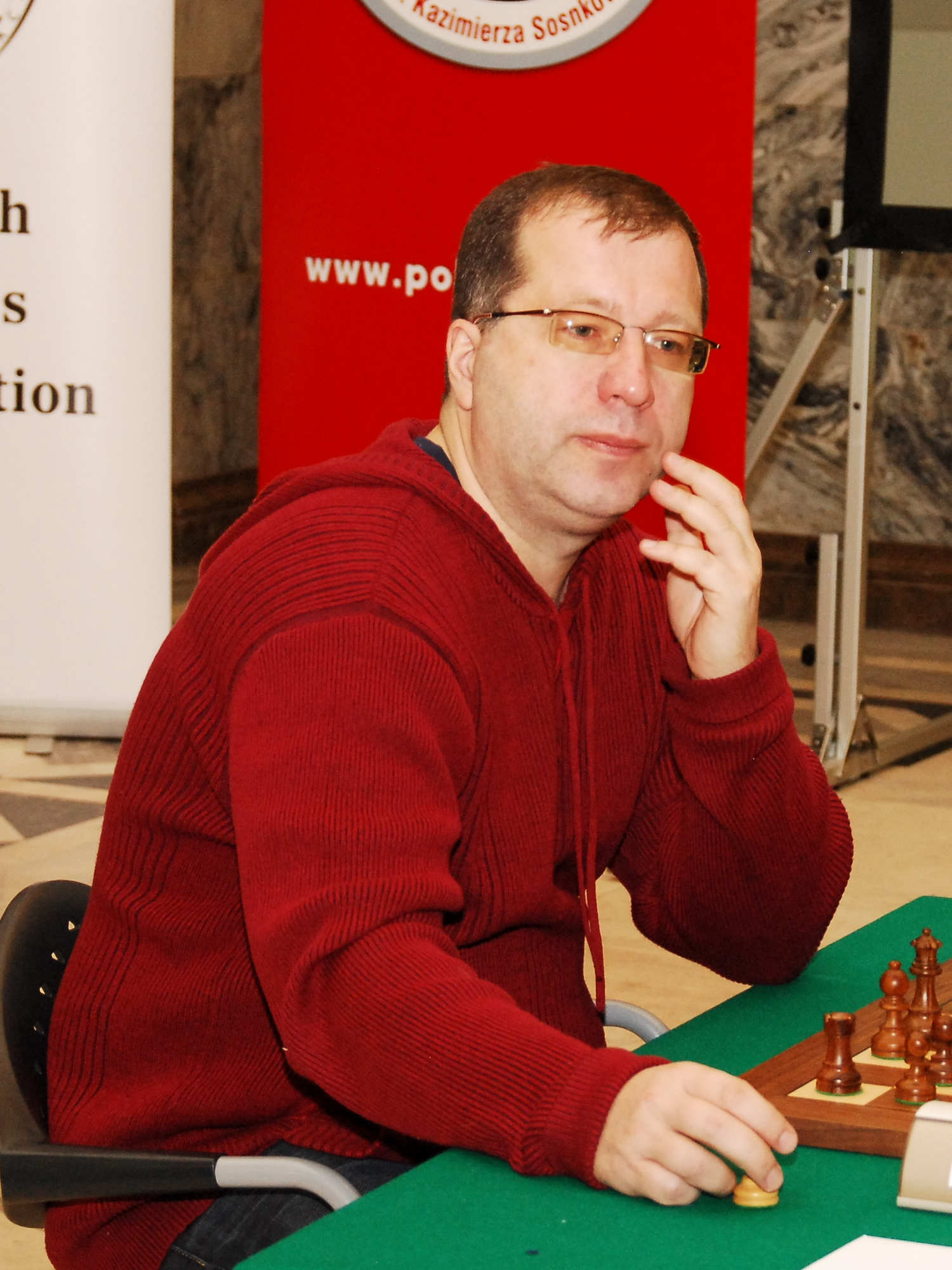

Personal information
- Born: Alexey Sergeyevich Dreev; 30 January 1969 (age 57) Stavropol, Russian SFSR, Soviet Union

Chess career
- Country: Soviet Union → Russia
- Title: Grandmaster (1989)
- FIDE rating: 2577 (July 2026)
- Peak rating: 2711 (July 2011)
- Peak ranking: No. 11 (January 1996)

Alexey Sergeyevich Dreev (Алексей Сергеевич Дреев, also transliterated as Aleksey or Alexei; born 30 January 1969) is a Russian chess player. He was awarded the title Grandmaster by FIDE in 1989.

== Career ==
Dreev was coached for a period by chess trainer Mark Dvoretsky.

Dreev was world under 16 champion in 1983 and 1984, and the European junior champion in 1988. In 1989 he became a grandmaster, won a strong tournament at Moscow (+5 =5 −1) and made his first appearance in the Russian Chess Championship.

In the 1990–1993 world championship cycle he qualified for the Candidates Tournament at Manila 1990 Interzonal, but lost his 1991 round of sixteen match to Viswanathan Anand in Madras (+1 =5 −4). Then in the FIDE World Championship Tournaments, firstly at Groningen 1997, he reached the quarter-finals where he lost to Boris Gelfand. In the next four FIDE World Championship tournaments he was knocked out at the last sixteen stage: at Las Vegas 1999 by Michael Adams, at New Delhi 2000 to Veselin Topalov, at Moscow 2001 to Viswanathan Anand, and finally at Tripoli 2004 to Leinier Domínguez.

During the 1990s, his best international tournament victories included the Biel Grandmaster Tournament (+5 =8 −0) and the Hoogovens tournament (+9 =4 −1), both in 1995; in the latter, Dreev beat Evgeny Bareev by 2.5-1.5 in the final. He also won at Reggio Emilia in 1995/96.

In 2000 Dreev won the 1st European Blitz Chess Championship in Neum on tiebreak over Ivan Sokolov.

He played in the prestigious 2002 match Russia versus Rest of the World and contributed a plus score, although the Russian team went on to lose the match. He was the winner at Dos Hermanas 2001 and at Esbjerg 2003.

Dreev's best performance in the Russian Championship was in 2004 at Moscow when he finished third (+4 =5 −2). This tournament was won by Garry Kasparov.

In 2007 he won the 5th Parsvnath Open in New Delhi. Dreev won the Magistral Casino de Barcelona round-robin tournament in 2008. In 2011 he won the Cento Open on tiebreak score.

Dreev won the European Rapid Chess Championship of 2012 in Warsaw.

In May 2013 he tied for 1st–8th with Alexander Moiseenko, Evgeny Romanov, Alexander G Beliavsky, Constantin Lupulescu, Francisco Vallejo Pons, Sergei Movsesian, Ian Nepomniachtchi, Hrant Melkumyan and Evgeny Alekseev in the European Individual Chess Championship. He competed in the Chess World Cup 2013 in Tromsø, where he reached the third round and was eliminated by the eventual runner-up, Dmitry Andreikin. Dreev knocked out Sergei Azarov and Wang Hao in rounds one and two respectively.

In October of the same year, Dreev won the 3rd Indonesia Open Chess Championship in Jakarta.

In January 2016, Dreev tied with Baskaran Adhiban and Eltaj Safarli for first place in the Tata Steel Challengers Tournament in Wijk aan Zee. However, because of his better tiebreak, Adhiban qualified for the following Tata Steel Masters Tournament. In 2018 Dreev won the Fall Chess Classic A tournament in St. Louis, US with a score of 6½/9, one point ahead of the nearest follower, Lázaro Bruzón.

He has represented Russia in five Chess Olympiads between 1992 and 2004, with the Russian team winning gold medals in 1992, 1994, and 1996, and silver in 2004. His combined score from those events is +15 =23 −6 (60.2%).

== Books ==
- Dreev, Alexey (2007). My One Hundred Best Games. Chess Stars. ISBN 978-9548782555.
- Dreev, Alexey (2010). The Moscow & Anti-Moscow Variations. An Insider's View. Chess Stars. ISBN 978-9548782746.
- Dreev, Alexey (2011). The Meran & Anti-Meran Variations. An Insider's View. Chess Stars. ISBN 978-9548782807.
- Dreev, Alexey (2013). Dreev vs. the Benoni. Chess Stars. ISBN 978-9548782920.
- Dreev, Alexey (2014). Anti-Spanish. The Cozio Defence. Chess Stars. ISBN 978-6197188011.
- Dreev, Alexey (2015). Attacking the Caro-Kann. Chess Stars. ISBN 978-6197188042.
- Dreev, Alexey (2016). Bf4 in the Queen's Gambit and the Exchange Slav. Chess Stars. ISBN 978-6197188080.
- Dreev, Alexey (2018). Improve Your Practical Play in the Middlegame. Thinkers Publishing. ISBN 978-9492510310.
- Dreev, Alexey (2019). Improve Your Practical Play in the Endgame. Thinkers Publishing. ISBN 978-9492510594.

== Notable games ==
- Alexey Dreev-Gata Kamsky Kazakhstan 1987 Ponziani opening 1-0 56 moves.
- Alexey Dreev-Viswanathan Anand Candidates match game 3 1991 Queen's Indian defence 1-0 46 moves.
- Loek van Wely-Alexey Dreev World cup 2005 Semi-Slav defence 0-1 91 moves.
- Alexander Morozevich-Alexey Dreev Russian Superfinals 2007 Sicilian defence 0-1 49 moves.
- Sam A Schmakel-Alexey Dreev Millionaire Chess 2014 Slav defence modern line 0-1 39 moves.
