= Zoltán Almási =

Hungarian chess grandmaster (born 1976)

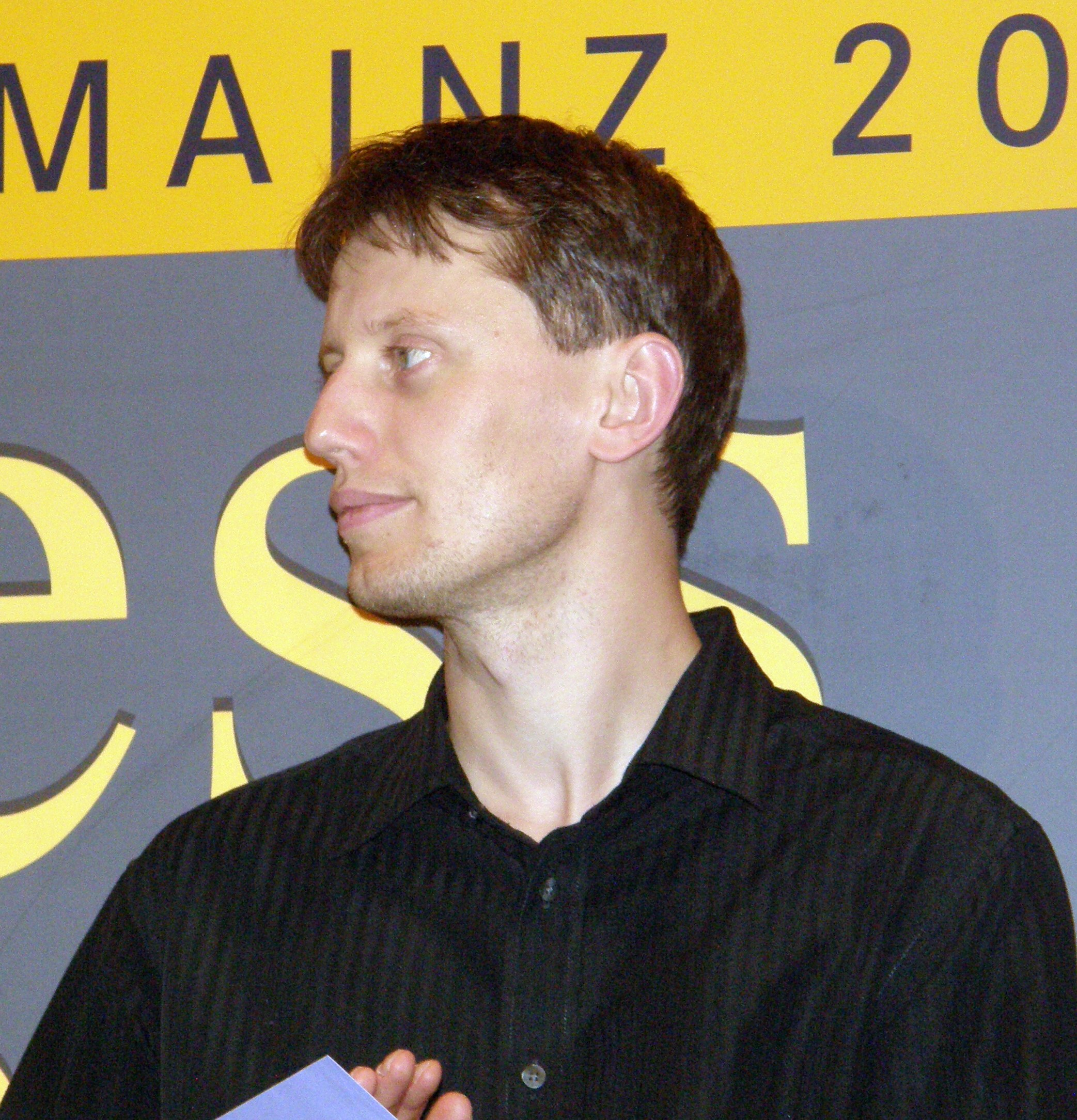
- Almási in 2007

Personal information
- Born: August 29, 1976 (age 49)

Chess career
- Country: Hungary
- Title: Grandmaster (1993)
- FIDE rating: 2677 (July 2026)
- Peak rating: 2726 (July 2011)
- Peak ranking: No. 18 (July 1995)

Zoltán Almási (born August 29, 1976) is a Hungarian chess player. Awarded the title Grandmaster by FIDE in 1993, he is a nine-time Hungarian champion, winning in 1995, 1997, 1999, 2000, 2003, 2006, 2008, 2009, and 2019.

Almási has competed in 13 consecutive Chess Olympiads from 1994 to 2018 earning team silver in 2002 and 2014 as well as individual silver in 2010 (on board two) and 2016 (on board three).

In the FIDE World Chess Championship 2004, he made it to the fourth round where he lost 2–0 to Rustam Kasimdzhanov, the eventual winner of the event.

In 2008 he won the Reggio Emilia tournament in Italy scoring 5½/8 points.

He crossed the 2700 FIDE rating line in November 2009 (2704).

In 2010, he won the European Rapid Chess Championship. He tied with five other players after 13 rounds and won tiebreak matches against Shirov and Gashimov. The next year he won the Sport Accord Mindgames Blindfold section.

In 2013, Almási won the Capablanca Memorial scoring 6½/10 points.

In the 1990s Almási was one of the very few grandmasters to play the Berlin defense which was then considered as dubious. His games inspired Vladimir Kramnik to adopt the system for his world championship match against Garry Kasparov in 2000 which then caused a resurgence of interest in the opening.
