= Alexander Motylev =

Russian chess grandmaster (born 1979)

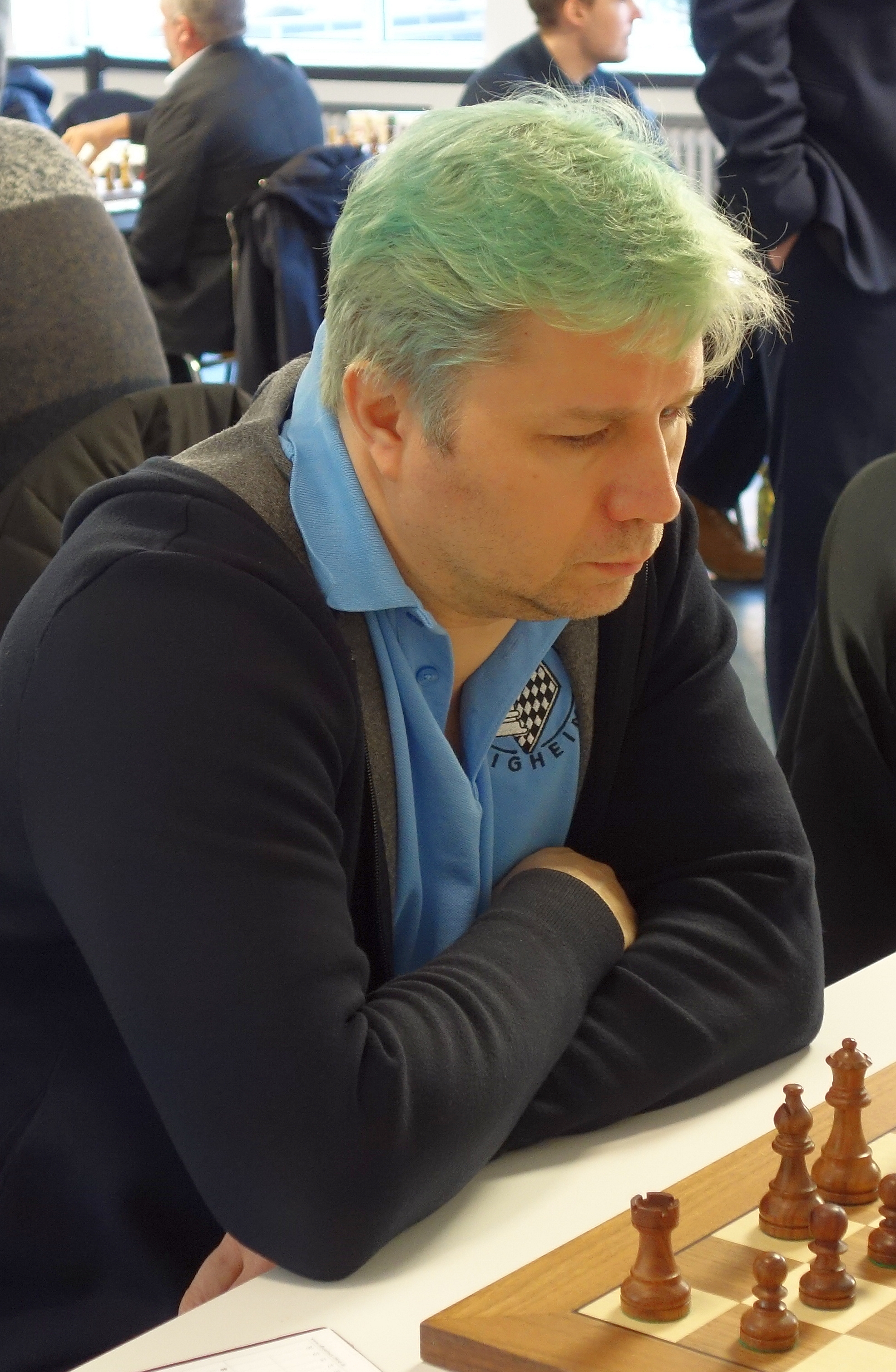
- Motylev in 2023

Personal information
- Born: Alexander Anatolyevich Motylev; 17 June 1979 (age 47) Sverdlosk, Russian SFSR, Soviet Union

Chess career
- Country: Russia (until June 2023); Romania (since June 2023)
- Title: Grandmaster (2000)
- FIDE rating: 2547 (October 2026)
- Peak rating: 2710 (July 2009)
- Peak ranking: No. 23 (April 2005)

Alexander Anatolyevich Motylev (Russian: Александр Анатольевич Мотылёв; born 17 June 1979) is a Russian chess grandmaster. He was Russian champion in 2001 and European champion in 2014.

== Career ==
He learnt how to play at the age of four and a half years and at age six took part in group instruction sessions. Motylev became a Candidate Master at eleven years old. Around this time, he was also gifted at football, a sport for which he had major aspirations. Made aware of his split loyalties by his chess coach, Motylev's physical education teacher advised him to concentrate on chess and this proved to be good advice, as he went on to become national junior champion at both under 16 and under 18 level.

Motylev was the runner-up in the 1998 European Junior Chess Championship, won by Levon Aronian.

In 2001, he won the Russian Chess Championship and played for the national team in the World Team Chess Championship, where he contributed to the team silver medal scoring 2/3. In 2002, he was invited to take part in the Russia vs Rest of the World match in Moscow and, in the company of the world's elite players, scored 1/6. In 2003, he won the Corsican Open at Bastia, ahead of a strong field including Loek van Wely, Krishnan Sasikiran and Sergei Tiviakov.

In 2004, Motylev won the Tomsk qualifier and in the Superfinal of the 57th Russian Championship he finished fourth, behind Garry Kasparov, with whom Motylev drew, Alexander Grischuk and Alexey Dreev. In 2005, he tied for first in the Aeroflot Open. Later that year, Motylev finished second at the 2nd Sanjin Hotel Cup, behind Pentala Harikrishna, whom he defeated, and qualified again for the Russian Superfinal, this time by finishing equal third in Kazan.

In 2006, he was the joint winner of the Corus B Tournament in Wijk aan Zee with Magnus Carlsen. Motylev finished second, behind Ian Nepomniachtchi, in the Aeroflot Open 2008. In June 2009, he won the 10th Anatoly Karpov International Tournament (pl) (category 18, 2694) in Poikovsky, Russia.

Motylev won the 2014 European Individual Chess Championship in Yerevan with 9/11 and a rating performance of 2872, the best performance in the event's history. In April 2014, he took clear second place, behind Pavel Eljanov, in the B tournament of the Vugar Gashimov Memorial in Şəmkir, Azerbaijan. In July of the same year, he participated in the Biel Grandmaster Tournament and scored 3.5/10 (+1 =5 –4), finishing last.

He placed equal first (second on tiebreak) in the 2015 Russian Championship Higher League with 6.5/9 and qualified for the Superfinal. In the latter he scored 4/11, tying for 11th-12th place with Ildar Khairullin and placing last on tiebreak. In 2017 Motylev won the Russian Rapid Chess Championship in Sochi. In August 2022 in Barcelona he reached second place at the 23rd Sants Open, scoring 7.5/10. Motylev switched to the Romanian Chess Federation in June 2023 and is currently working as Technical Director of Romanian National Teams.

== Personal life ==
His father Anatoly is a FIDE Master.

Together with 43 other Russian elite chess players, Motylev signed an open letter to Russian president Vladimir Putin, protesting against the 2022 Russian invasion of Ukraine and expressing solidarity with the Ukrainian people.

Preceded by Sergey Volkov	Russian Chess Champion; 2001	Succeeded by Alexander Lastin
