= Farid Abbasov =

Azerbaijani chess grandmaster (born 1979)

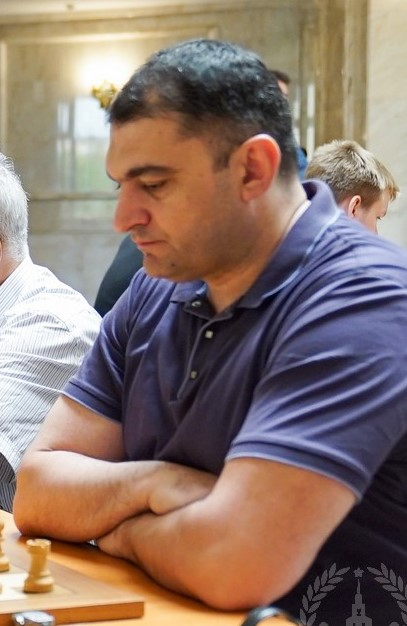
- Abbasov in 2022

Personal information
- Born: January 31, 1979 (age 47) Baku, Azerbaijan SSR, Soviet Union

Chess career
- Country: Azerbaijan
- Title: Grandmaster (2007)
- FIDE rating: 2493 (August 2026)
- Peak rating: 2578 (October 2008)

Farid Abbasov (Azerbaijani: Fərid Abbasov; born January 31, 1979) is an Azerbaijani chess Grandmaster (2007). He is ranked 16th in Azerbaijan as of August 2025.

== Biography ==
In 1997, he took second place in the European Youth Chess Championship.

In 2001, he was awarded the International Master title.

Best results: 1st at Alushta 2004; 1st at Kireyevsk 2004; 2nd at Tula 2006; 1st at Konya 2006; 1st the Rohde Open in Sautron, France 2007; 1st at Çanakkale 2007; 1st at La Fère Open (France) 2008; 1st at Nîmes Open (France) 2008; 2nd at the President's Cup in Baku 2008; 1st at the Caspian Cup in Rasht 2010.

In 2007, he won the gold medal at an international tournament in Laholm, Sweden. Thieves broke into his hotel room and stole his laptop computer, flight ticket, and documents.

He has coached the Azerbaijan Youth chess team for the past 9 years.
