= Vadim Milov =

Swiss chess grandmaster (born 1972)

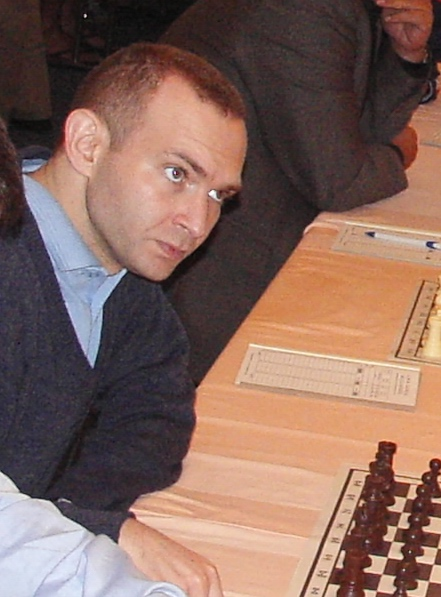

Personal information
- Born: 1 August 1972 (age 54) Ufa, Russian SFSR, Soviet Union

Chess career
- Country: Soviet Union (until 1991); Israel (1992–1996); Switzerland (since 1996)
- Title: Grandmaster (1993)
- FIDE rating: 2581 (September 2026)
- Peak rating: 2705 (July 2008)
- Peak ranking: No. 22 (July 2004)

Vadim Markovich Milov (Russian: Вадим Маркович Милов; Hebrew: ואדים מרקוביץ' מילוב; born 1 August 1972) is a Swiss chess player who received the FIDE title of Grandmaster (GM) in 1993.

== Early life ==
Born in Ufa, following the collapse of the USSR, he moved to Israel in 1992, before finally settling in Switzerland in 1996.

== Career ==
He played at the traditional GM Invitation tournament of Biel in 1996, co-winning with then reigning FIDE World Chess Champion Anatoly Karpov, ahead of prominent players such as Jaan Ehlvest, who was sole third, Ulf Andersson, Zoltán Almási, Joël Lautier, Lajos Portisch or Tony Miles who was placed last in a field of twelve players.

He won the Australian Open Chess Championship in 1999, held in Sunshine Coast.

Some tournament successes include joint first places at Aeroflot Open 2002, Santo Domingo 2003, Geneva 2004, the 2005 U.S. Open and Gibraltar 2009 (but lost the play-off against Peter Svidler). He also won the Corsica Masters International Rapid 2005 by defeating Viswanathan Anand in the finals.

In 2015 Milov won the Swiss Chess Championship by defeating Alexandra Kosteniuk 1½-½ in a rapid playoff.

He has so far played twice in Chess Olympiads.

- In 1994, at second reserve board in 31st Chess Olympiad in Moscow (+4 –1 =4) for Israel;
- In 2000, at second board in 34th Chess Olympiad in Istanbul (+3 –2 =7) for Switzerland.

In recent years, he has been relatively inactive and playing very few tournaments.
