= Loek van Wely =

Dutch chess grandmaster and politician (born 1972)

- Loek van Wely at the 2026 Chess Olympiad

Personal information
- Born: 7 October 1972 (age 54) Heesch, Netherlands

Chess career
- Country: Netherlands
- Title: Grandmaster (1993)
- FIDE rating: 2626 (November 2026)
- Peak rating: 2714 (October 2001)
- Ranking: No. 97 (November 2026)
- Peak ranking: No. 10 (October 2001)

Loek van Wely (born 7 October 1972) is a Dutch chess player and politician. He was awarded the title Grandmaster by FIDE in 1993, and was rated among the world's top ten in 2001 with a rating of 2714. In March 2019, he was elected to the Dutch Senate for the right-wing Forum for Democracy; however, on 8 December 2020 he switched his party allegiance to the van Pareren group, which is now affiliated with the right-wing JA21 party.

== Chess career ==
He has won the Dutch Chess Championship on eight occasions: six consecutive times from 2000 through 2005, in 2014 and in 2017.

In 2002, in Maastricht, Netherlands, van Wely took on the computer program Rebel in a four-game match, scoring 2/4 (+2–2=0). In 2001, he led the Dutch team to victory at the European Team Championship in León, Spain and in 2005 in Gothenburg, Sweden.

Van Wely participated in the elite tournament held in Wijk aan Zee (originally named Hoogovens, then Corus, now Tata Steel) 25 times, consecutively from 1992 to 2010 and again from 2012 to 2017. His best result occurred in 2003, when he shared fourth place with Alexei Shirov, Alexander Grischuk, Vassily Ivanchuk and Vladimir Kramnik scoring 7 out of 13 points.

In May 2010, van Wely won the 14th Chicago Open. In 2011, he came in first at Berkeley International tournament in Berkeley. In 2016, he won the Hogeschool Zeeland tournament scoring 8 points from 9 games.
