= FIDE World Chess Championship 1998 =

Chess match between Anatoly Karpov and Viswanathan Anand

	Defending champion	Challenger
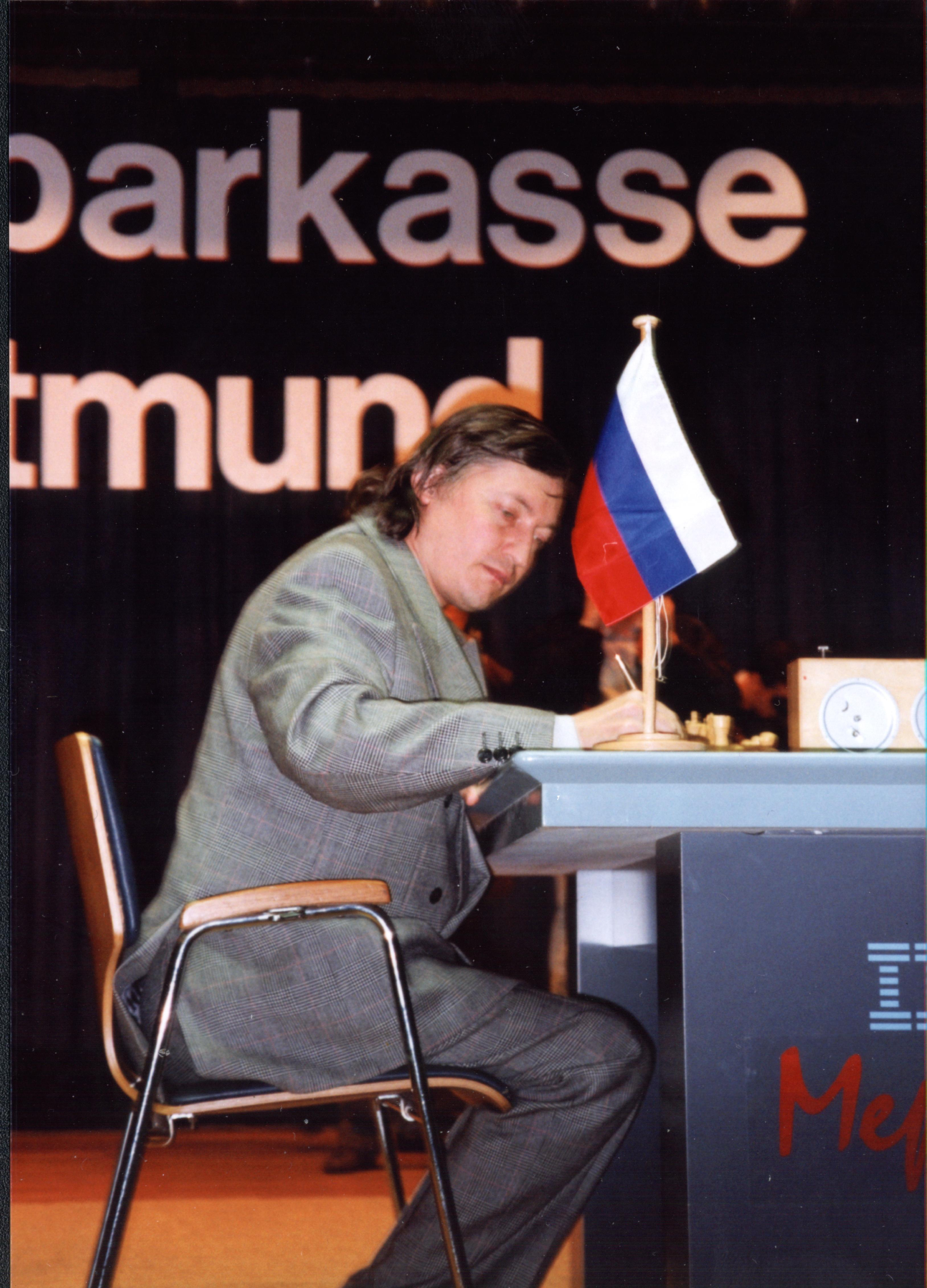
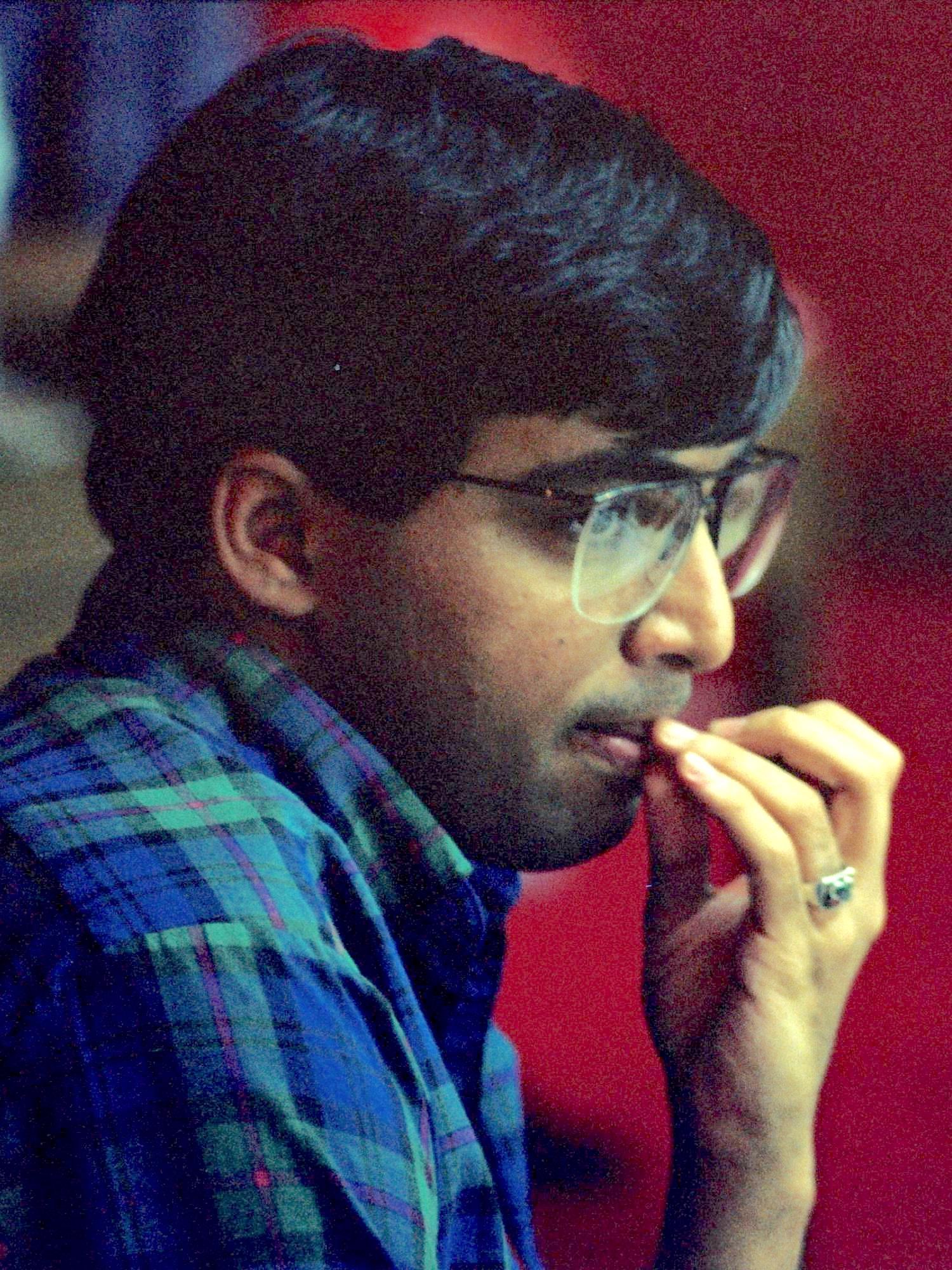
	Anatoly Karpov	Viswanathan Anand
	(Russia) Anatoly Karpov	(India) Viswanathan Anand
3 (2)	Scores	3 (0)
	Born 23 May 1951; 46 years old	Born 11 December 1969; 28 years old
	Winner of the FIDE World Chess Championship 1996	Winner of the Candidates Tournament 1997
	Rating: 2735 (World No. 6)	Rating: 2770 (World No. 3)

The FIDE World Chess Championship 1998 was contested in a match between the FIDE World Champion Anatoly Karpov and the challenger Viswanathan Anand. The match took place between 2 January and 9 January 1998 in Lausanne, Switzerland.

The challenger was determined in a tournament held in Groningen, Netherlands, between 9 December and 30 December 1997.

After the championship match ended in a draw, Karpov won the rapid playoff, becoming the 1998 FIDE World Chess Champion.

== New World Championship format ==
=== Background ===
From 1948 to 1993, the world chess championship had been administered by FIDE, the international chess federation. In 1993, World Chess Champion Garry Kasparov split from FIDE and formed a rival organisation, the Professional Chess Association. FIDE stripped Kasparov of his title, meaning there were now two rival championships: the FIDE title, held by Anatoly Karpov, and the PCA title, held by Kasparov.

Karpov and Kasparov had successfully defended their titles at the FIDE World Chess Championship 1996 and PCA World Chess Championship 1995 respectively.

From 1948 until 1996, World Chess Championships had followed a similar pattern: a series of qualifying tournaments and matches were held over more than a year, culminating in the Candidates Tournament. The winner of the Candidates tournament was the official challenger for the world title and would play the incumbent champion in a match for world championship. (The 1996 cycle was an exception. The incumbent world champion participated in the Candidates tournament as a seeded in the Candidates final.)

In 1997, FIDE president Kirsan Ilyumzhinov proposed a completely new structure: a knockout tournament, consisting of two-game matches (slightly longer in the final rounds), with match tie-breakers using rapid chess and blitz chess if necessary. This format had been done before in tournaments such as Tilburg 1992–94, but never at the world championship level.

In addition to the new format, it was proposed by Ilyumzhinov as a way to unify the two rival world titles. To do this, FIDE champion Anatoly Karpov and PCA champion Garry Kasparov were each to be seeded into the semi-finals.

Kasparov did not want to defend his title under these circumstances and declined his invitation. The format was then modified to have FIDE champion Karpov seeded directly into the final.

=== Controversies ===
The advantages of the new format were:

- It avoided a long cycle, and was all over in a month or so. This is could all be done in the one venue, it would not have the scheduling problems which had beset some previous world championship cycles. Each round could be played in 3 days (one day for each normal time control game, and one for the tie breaks).
- More players (up to 128) could be included.
- There were no special privileges for the incumbent champion or seeded players (although some were preserved in the earlier championships, these were eliminated later on).

Opponents pointed out disadvantages of the format:

- Short matches (only two games in the earlier rounds) left too much to chance – the stronger player could blunder a game, and it would be difficult to recover from a bad start. (Many world championship and Candidates matches had been won by the player who recovered from an early loss.)
- The rapid playoffs were also seen to be left too much to chance: strength in rapid chess is not the same as strength in chess with normal time controls.
- These first two considerations, taken together, meant there was a very high chance that the best player would not win, or even that a complete outsider might win, opponents argued.
- Some people felt that the tradition of the champion being seeded into the final should be preserved, so that a new champion can only be champion by defeating the old champion.
- However, the scheduling of the match caused great controversy regarding the fairness of the contest: Anand was forced to play a fresh and prepared Karpov a mere three days after his exhausting performance at Groningen.

=== Prominent non-participants ===
- Kasparov did not want to defend his title under these circumstances, and declined his invitation.
- Vladimir Kramnik declined to play, in protest against having the final with Karpov shortly after the end of the tournament.

== Participants ==
All players are grandmasters unless indicated otherwise.

1. Vladimir Kramnik^{1} (RUS), 2770
2. Viswanathan Anand (IND), 2765
3. Anatoly Karpov (RUS), 2745
4. Veselin Topalov (BUL), 2745
5. Vassily Ivanchuk (UKR), 2725
6. Alexander Beliavsky (SLO), 2710
7. Alexei Shirov (ESP), 2700
8. Boris Gelfand (BLR), 2695
9. Michael Adams (ENG), 2680
10. Valery Salov (RUS), 2680
11. Yevgeny Bareev (RUS), 2670
12. Kiril Georgiev (BUL), 2670
13. Judit Polgár (HUN), 2670
14. Matthew Sadler (ENG), 2665
15. Vladimir Akopian (ARM), 2660
16. Aleksej Alexandrov (BLR), 2660
17. Joël Lautier (FRA), 2660
18. Nigel Short (ENG), 2660
19. Peter Svidler (RUS), 2660
20. Alexander Khalifman (RUS), 2655
21. Loek van Wely (NED), 2655
22. Zurab Azmaiparashvili (GEO), 2650
23. Sergei Rublevsky (RUS), 2650
24. Alex Yermolinsky (USA), 2650
25. Michal Krasenkov (POL), 2645
26. Lembit Oll (EST), 2645
27. Eduardas Rozentalis (LTU), 2645
28. Ulf Andersson (SWE), 2640
29. Alexander Chernin (HUN), 2640
30. Alexey Dreev (RUS), 2640
31. Rafael Vaganian (ARM), 2640
32. Arthur Yussupov (GER), 2640
33. Peter Leko (HUN), 2635
34. Vadim Milov (SUI), 2635
35. Ivan Sokolov (BIH), 2635
36. Vadim Zvjaginsev (RUS), 2635
37. Predrag Nikolić (BIH), 2630
38. Jeroen Piket (NED), 2630
39. Yasser Seirawan (USA), 2630
40. Giorgy Giorgadze (GEO), 2625
41. Julio Granda (PER), 2625
42. Jan Timman (NED), 2625
43. Zoltán Almási (HUN), 2615
44. Boris Alterman (ISR), 2615
45. Vladimir Malaniuk (UKR), 2615
46. Vladislav Tkachiev (KAZ), 2615
47. Utut Adianto (INA), 2610
48. Jaan Ehlvest (EST), 2610
49. Viktor Korchnoi (SUI), 2610
50. Lajos Portisch (HUN), 2610
51. Jóhann Hjartarson (ISL), 2605
52. Zbyněk Hráček (CZE), 2605
53. Friso Nijboer (NED), 2605
54. Curt Hansen (DEN), 2600
55. Grigory Kaidanov (USA), 2600
56. Ivan Morovic (CHI), 2600
57. Gilberto Milos (BRA), 2590
58. Alexander Morozevich (RUS), 2590
59. Emil Sutovsky (ISR), 2590
60. Sergei Tiviakov (RUS), 2590
61. Viktor Bologan (MDA), 2585
62. Miguel Illescas (ESP), 2585
63. Vasilios Kotronias (GRE), 2585
64. Alexander Nenashev (UZB), 2585
65. Andrei Sokolov (RUS), 2585
66. Joel Benjamin (USA), 2580
67. Boris Gulko (USA), 2580
68. Kevin Spraggett (CAN), 2575
69. Vladimir Epishin (RUS), 2570
70. Stefan Kindermann (GER), 2570
71. Konstantin Lerner (UKR), 2560
72. Margeir Petursson (ISL), 2555
73. Paul van der Sterren (NED), 2555
74. Larry Christiansen (USA), 2550
75. Andrei Istrățescu (ROM), 2550
76. Roman Slobodjan (GER), 2550
77. Ashot Anastasian (ARM), 2545
78. Étienne Bacrot (FRA), 2545
79. Bojan Kurajica (BIH), 2545
80. Alexander Fominyh (RUS), 2535
81. Hichem Hamdouchi (MAR), 2535
82. Peng Xiaomin (CHN), 2530
83. Peter Wells (ENG), 2530
84. Gilberto Hernandez (MEX), 2525
85. Thomas Luther (GER), 2525
86. John van der Wiel (NED), 2525
87. Wang Zili (CHN), 2520
88. Dibyendu Barua (IND), 2515
89. Šarūnas Šulskis (LTU), 2510
90. Igor Glek (RUS), 2505
91. Igor Miladinović (GRE), 2500
92. Tal Shaked (USA), 2500, IM
93. Niaz Murshed (BAN), 2490
94. Gildardo Garcia (COL), 2480
95. Vasily Smyslov (RUS), 2480
96. Helgi Grétarsson (ISL), 2475
97. Essam Mohammed^{2} (EGY), 2460, IM
98. Hendrik Hoeksema (NED), 2400, IM
99. Watu Kobese (RSA), 2315, IM
100. Alexander Umgaev (RUS), unrated, no title

^{1} Kramnik (ranked 2nd in the world) declined participation on the grounds that Karpov's direct entry into the final was unacceptable.

^{2} Mohammed did not appear.

Garry Kasparov (ranked 1st in the world), Gata Kamsky (ranked 7th), and Zsuzsa Polgar (Women's world champion) declined participation in advance.

Karpov as defending FIDE champion was seeded directly into the championship match. Of the 97 remaining participants, 68 entered the tournament in the first round, 28 in the second round and 1 (Gelfand, loser from Round 3 of the previous Candidates match) in the third round.

== Results, rounds 1-4 ==
=== Section 1 ===
First round
40	(Georgia (country)) Giorgy Giorgadze	4
78	(France) Étienne Bacrot	3
27	(Lithuania) Eduardas Rozentalis	1½
71	(Ukraine) Konstantin Lerner	½
47	(Indonesia) Utut Adianto	2
87	(China) Wang Zili	0

Second round
9	(England) Michael Adams	2
40	(Georgia (country)) Giorgy Giorgadze	0
27	(Lithuania) Eduardas Rozentalis	½
60	(Russia) Sergei Tiviakov	1½
19	(Russia) Peter Svidler	1½
47	(Indonesia) Utut Adianto	½
35	(Bosnia and Herzegovina) Ivan Sokolov	1½
69	(Russia) Vladimir Epishin	2½

Third round
9	(England) Michael Adams	1½
60	(Russia) Sergei Tiviakov	½
19	(Russia) Peter Svidler	1½
69	(Russia) Vladimir Epishin	½

Fourth round
9	(England) Michael Adams	4
19	(Russia) Peter Svidler	2

=== Section 2 ===
First round
54	(Denmark) Curt Hansen	1½
91	(Greece) Igor Miladinović	2½
44	(Israel) Boris Alterman	1½
83	(England) Peter Wells	½
74	(United States) Larry Christiansen	4
28	(Sweden) Ulf Andersson	5
63	(Greece) Vasilios Kotronias	1½
34	(Switzerland) Vadim Milov	2½

Second round
4	(Bulgaria) Veselin Topalov	½
38	(Netherlands) Jeroen Piket	1½
21	(Netherlands) Loek van Wely	1½
91	(Greece) Igor Miladinović	½
12	(Bulgaria) Kiril Georgiev	2½
44	(Israel) Boris Alterman	1½
28	(Sweden) Ulf Andersson	3
34	(Switzerland) Vadim Milov	4

Third round
38	(Netherlands) Jeroen Piket	2½
21	(Netherlands) Loek van Wely	3½
12	(Bulgaria) Kiril Georgiev	1½
34	(Switzerland) Vadim Milov	½

Fourth round
21	(Netherlands) Loek van Wely	1½
12	(Bulgaria) Kiril Georgiev	½

=== Section 3 ===
First round
23	(Russia) Sergei Rublevsky	2
68	(Canada) Kevin Spraggett	0
92	(Israel) Tal Shaked	3
56	(Chile) Ivan Morovic	2
49	(Switzerland) Viktor Korchnoi	1½
84	(Mexico) Gilberto Hernandez	½
29	(Hungary) Alexander Chernin	2
75	(France) Andrei Istrățescu	3
65	(Russia) Andrei Sokolov	1½
99	(South Africa) Watu Kobese	½

Second round
6	(Slovenia) Alexander Beliavsky	1½
42	(Netherlands) Jan Timman	½
23	(Russia) Sergei Rublevsky	1½
92	(Israel) Tal Shaked	½
18	(England) Nigel Short	3½
49	(Switzerland) Viktor Korchnoi	2½
75	(France) Andrei Istrățescu	0
65	(Russia) Andrei Sokolov	2

Third round
6	(Slovenia) Alexander Beliavsky	2½
23	(Russia) Sergei Rublevsky	1½
18	(England) Nigel Short	2
65	(Russia) Andrei Sokolov	0

Fourth round
6	(Slovenia) Alexander Beliavsky	1
18	(England) Nigel Short	3

=== Section 4 ===
First round
76	(Germany) Roman Slobodjan	1½
33	(Hungary) Peter Leko	½
16	(Belarus) Aleksej Alexandrov	3
67	(United States) Boris Gulko	2
51	(Iceland) Jóhann Hjartarson	2½
89	(Lithuania) Šarūnas Šulskis	1½
45	(Ukraine) Vladimir Malaniuk	2
81	(Morocco) Hichem Hamdouchi	0
25	(Poland) Michal Krasenkov	1½
73	(Netherlands) Paul van der Sterren	½
59	(Israel) Emil Sutovsky	½
94	(Colombia) Gildardo Garcia	1½

Second round
22	(Georgia (country)) Zurab Azmaiparashvili	2½
76	(Germany) Roman Slobodjan	1½
16	(Belarus) Aleksej Alexandrov	2½
51	(Iceland) Jóhann Hjartarson	1½
11	(Russia) Yevgeny Bareev	2
45	(Ukraine) Vladimir Malaniuk	0
25	(Poland) Michal Krasenkov	1½
94	(Colombia) Gildardo Garcia	½

Third round
22	(Georgia (country)) Zurab Azmaiparashvili	1½
16	(Belarus) Aleksej Alexandrov	½
11	(Russia) Yevgeny Bareev	½
25	(Poland) Michal Krasenkov	1½

Fourth round
22	(Georgia (country)) Zurab Azmaiparashvili	3
25	(Poland) Michal Krasenkov	4

=== Section 5 ===
First round
95	(Russia) Vasily Smyslov	0
58	(Russia) Alexander Morozevich	2
72	(Iceland) Margeir Petursson	½
26	(Estonia) Lembit Oll	1½
80	(Russia) Alexander Fominyh	½
46	(Kazakhstan) Vladislav Tkachiev	1½
88	(India) Dibyendu Barua	2
52	(Czech Republic) Zbyněk Hráček	3

Second round
58	(Russia) Alexander Morozevich	½
26	(Estonia) Lembit Oll	1½
46	(Kazakhstan) Vladislav Tkachiev	3
10	(Russia) Valery Salov	1
52	(Czech Republic) Zbyněk Hráček	½
17	(France) Joël Lautier	1½

Third round
26	(Estonia) Lembit Oll	1½
46	(Kazakhstan) Vladislav Tkachiev	2½
17	(France) Joël Lautier	2
8	(Belarus) Boris Gelfand	4

Fourth round
46	(Kazakhstan) Vladislav Tkachiev	2½
8	(Belarus) Boris Gelfand	3½

=== Section 6 ===
First round
98	(Netherlands) Hendrik Hoeksema	½
64	(Uzbekistan) Alexander Nenashev	1½
86	(Netherlands) John van der Wiel	½
48	(Estonia) Jaan Ehlvest	1½
66	(United States) Joel Benjamin	2
36	(Russia) Vadim Zvjaginsev	3
39	(United States) Yasser Seirawan	3
77	(Armenia) Ashot Anastasian	1

Second round
64	(Uzbekistan) Alexander Nenashev	½
30	(Russia) Alexey Dreev	1½
48	(Estonia) Jaan Ehlvest	2
14	(England) Matthew Sadler	4
55	(United States) Grigory Kaidanov	2
36	(Russia) Vadim Zvjaginsev	4
39	(United States) Yasser Seirawan	1½
5	(Ukraine) Vassily Ivanchuk	½

Third round
30	(Russia) Alexey Dreev	1½
14	(England) Matthew Sadler	½
36	(Russia) Vadim Zvjaginsev	2½
39	(United States) Yasser Seirawan	1½

Fourth round
30	(Russia) Alexey Dreev	3
36	(Russia) Vadim Zvjaginsev	1

=== Section 7 ===
First round
96	(Iceland) Helgi Grétarsson	1½
62	(Spain) Miguel Illescas	½
82	(China) Peng Xiaomin	½
43	(Hungary) Zoltán Almási	1½
90	(Russia) Igor Glek	1½
53	(Netherlands) Friso Nijboer	2½

Second round
96	(Iceland) Helgi Grétarsson	½
32	(Germany) Artur Yusupov	1½
43	(Hungary) Zoltán Almási	1½
13	(Hungary) Judit Polgár	½
53	(Netherlands) Friso Nijboer	0
20	(Russia) Alexander Khalifman	2
37	(Bosnia and Herzegovina) Predrag Nikolić	0
2	(India) Viswanathan Anand	2

Third round
32	(Germany) Artur Yusupov	½
43	(Hungary) Zoltán Almási	1½
20	(Russia) Alexander Khalifman	2½
2	(India) Viswanathan Anand	3½

Fourth round
43	(Hungary) Zoltán Almási	0
2	(India) Viswanathan Anand	2

=== Section 8 ===
First round
100	(Russia) Alexander Umgaev	0
61	(Moldova) Viktor Bologan	2
85	(Germany) Thomas Luther	3½
50	(Hungary) Lajos Portisch	2½
57	(Brazil) Gilberto Milos	2
93	(Bangladesh) Niaz Murshed	0
70	(Germany) Stefan Kindermann	3
24	(United States) Alex Yermolinsky	2
79	(Bosnia and Herzegovina) Bojan Kurajica	1½
41	(Peru) Julio Granda	2½

Second round
61	(Moldova) Viktor Bologan	0
31	(Armenia) Rafael Vaganian	2
85	(Germany) Thomas Luther	½
15	(Armenia) Vladimir Akopian	1½
57	(Brazil) Gilberto Milos	2
70	(Germany) Stefan Kindermann	0
41	(Peru) Julio Granda	½
7	(Spain) Alexei Shirov	1½

Third round
31	(Armenia) Rafael Vaganian	3
15	(Armenia) Vladimir Akopian	4
57	(Brazil) Gilberto Milos	1½
7	(Spain) Alexei Shirov	2½

Fourth round
15	(Armenia) Vladimir Akopian	½
7	(Spain) Alexei Shirov	1½

== Results, rounds 5–7 ==
Quarterfinals
9	(England) Michael Adams	2½
21	(Netherlands) Loek van Wely	1½
18	(England) Nigel Short	2
25	(Poland) Michal Krasenkov	0
8	(Belarus) Boris Gelfand	2½
30	(Russia) Alexey Dreev	1½
2	(India) Viswanathan Anand	1½
7	(Spain) Alexei Shirov	½

Semifinals
9	(England) Michael Adams	4
18	(England) Nigel Short	3
8	(Belarus) Boris Gelfand	½
2	(India) Viswanathan Anand	1½

Final
9	(England) Michael Adams	4
2	(India) Viswanathan Anand	5

== Championship match ==
The match was played over 6 games in Lausanne, Switzerland (on January 2-3-4 and 6-7-8) and ended in a 3–3 tie. Two rapid games were then played on January 9. Karpov won both, retaining his FIDE title.

World Chess Championship Match 1998
	Rating	1	2	3	4	5	6	R1	R2	Points
Anatoly Karpov (Russia)	2735	1	0	½	1	½	0	1	1	5
Viswanathan Anand (India)	2770	0	1	½	0	½	1	0	0	3
