= Unuk =

Unuk may refer to:

- Unuk River, a river in Alaska and Canada
- Laura Unuk (born 1999), Slovenian chess player
