= Slovenian Chess Championship =

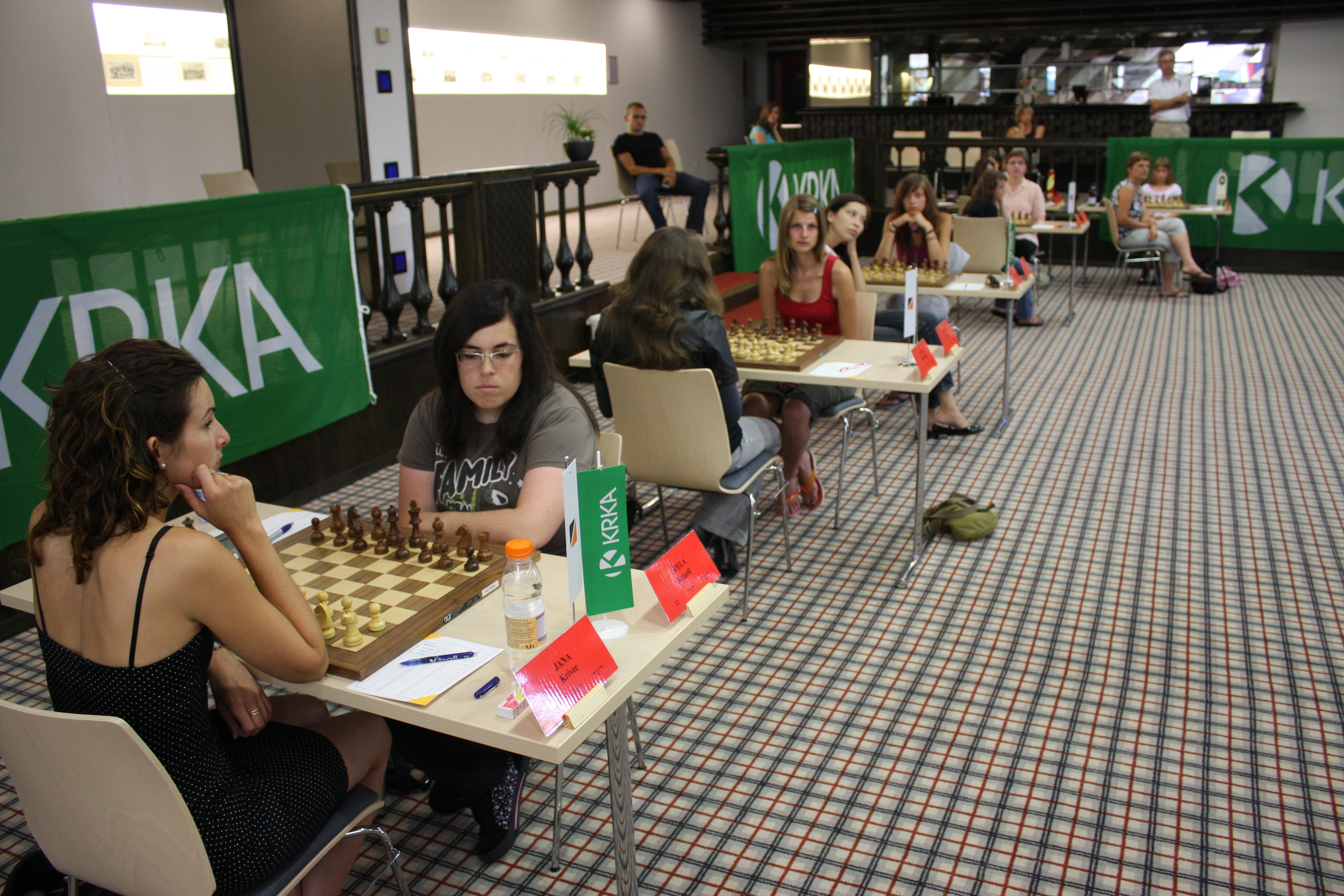
Slovenian Chess Championship 2009 on Otočec

The Slovenian Chess Championship is the national chess championship held in Slovenia. The championship has been played since the 1950s, first as a regional championship in the Socialist Federal Republic of Yugoslavia, and after the independence of Slovenia as a national championship. Before 1991, the championship was usually played as a qualifier for the Yugoslav Chess Championship in which not always the best players participated. This is because the best Slovenian players were often automatically qualified for the championship based on rating or performance in other tournaments.

== Winners ==
=== As a regional championship ===
Year	City (men)	Men	City (women)	Women
1936	Ljubljana	Jože Sorli	-	-
1946	Ljubljana	Milan Germek	-	-
1947	Kranj	Milan Longer	-	-
1948	Celje	Mlinar	Ljubljana	Slava Cvenkl
1949	-	-	Ljubljana	Slava Cvenkl
1950	-	-	Ljubljana	Majda Kokalj
1951	Ljubljana	Vasja Pirc	Ljubljana	Alojzija Pongrac
1952	Ljubljana	Milan Vidmar, Jr.	-	-
1953	Ljubljana	Milan Germek; Vasja Pirc	Ljubljana	Slava Cvenkl
1954	Ljubljana	Stojan Puc; Cveto Trampuž	Ljubljana	Božena Osterc
1955	Ljubljana	Zdravko Gabrovšek	Ljubljana	Lojzka Dvoršak
1956	Ljubljana	Branko Grosek	Dobrna	Osterc Božena
1957	Laško	Slavko Krivec	Idrija	Herma Svarcer
1958	Ljubljana	Stojan Puc	Ljubljana	Majda Struc
1959	Ljubljana	Bruno Parma	Ljubljana	Milka Ljiljak
1960	Izola	Janez Stupica	Murska Sobota	Mira Piberl
1961	Ljubljana	Bruno Parma	Ljubljana	Mira Piberl
1962	Ljubljana	Marjan Ankerst	Dobrna	Mira Piberl
1963	Ljubljana	Zvone Krzisnik	Ljubljana	Mira Piberl
1964	Ljubljana	Marjan Ankerst	Ljubljana	Milka Ljiljak
1965	Ljubljana	Stojan Puc; Janez Podkrajšek	Ljubljana	Milka Ljiljak
1966	Ljubljana	Janez Stupica	Maribor	Milka Ljiljak
1967	Ljubljana	Stojan Puc	Ljubljana	Mira Vospernik
1968	Ljubljana	Albin Planinc	Maribor	Herma Svarcer
1969	Ljubljana	Rudolf Osterman	Ljubljana	Ana Praznik
1970	Ljubljana	Vladimir Ivačič	Maribor	Brigita Serianz
1971	Ljubljana	Albin Planinc	Otočec	Pavla Košir
1972	Ljubljana	Janez Barle	Dravograd	Ana Praznik
1973	Maribor	Jože Papler	Ljubljana	Francka Petek
1974	Šmarješke Toplice	Janez Barle	Radovljica	Pavla Kosir
1975	Ptuj	Ivo Mihevc	Murska Sobota	Herma Svarcer
1976	Ljubljana	Vladimir Ivačič	Jesenice	Herma Svarcer
1977	Laško	Marjan Slak	Maribor	Francka Petek
1978	Radovljica	Rok Krzisnik	Maribor	Brigita Rakic-Serianc
1979	Maribor	Oskar Orel; Darko Steiner	Ljubljana	Nevenka Golc
1980	Trbovlje	Janez Barle	Maribor	Nevenka Golc
1981	Ljubljana	Janez Barle	Kranj	Francka Petek
1982	Kranj	Iztok Jelen	Celje	Mira Vospernik
1983	Maribor	Iztok Jelen	Kranj	Tatjana Vavpotic-Kosanski
1984	Radovljica	Janez Barle	Kranj	Tatjana Vavpotic-Kosanski
1985	Ptuj	Leon Gostiša	Kranj	Francka Petek
1986	Kranj	Leon Gostiša	Ptuj	Simona Orel
1987	Zalec	Leon Gostiša	Maribor	Tatjana Vavpotic-Kosanski
1988	Vrhnika	Aljoša Grosar	Postojna	Simona Orel
1989	Portorož	Damjan Plesec	Ljubljana	Anita Licina
1990	Ptuj	Igor Jelen	Ljubljana	Andreja Erjavec

=== As a national championship ===
Year	City (men)	Men	City (women)	Women
1991	Ljubljana	Aljoša Grosar	Ptuj	Anita Ličina
1992	Postojna	Leon Gostiša	Bled	Kiti Grosar
1993	Radovljica	Dražen Sermek	Murska Sobota	Nataša Krmelj
1994	Nova Gorica	Leon Gostiša	Podlehnik	Kiti Grosar
1995	Vrhnika	Bogdan Podlesnik	Ljubljana	Narcisa Mihevc
1996	Griže	Alexander Beliavsky	Griže	Anita Ličina
1997	Krško	Marko Tratar	Ljubljana	Jana Krivec
1998	Maribor	Dražen Sermek	Maribor	Kiti Grosar
1999	Kranj	Duško Pavasovič	Kranj	Narcisa Mihevc-Mohr
2000	Škofja Loka	Primož Šoln	Škofja Loka	Jana Krivec
2001	Griže	Aljoša Grosar	Griže	Darja Kapš
2002	Dobrna	Adrian Mihalcisin	Dobrna	Jana Krivec
2003	Bled	Jure Borišek	Bled	Jana Krivec
2004	Maribor	Tadej Sakelšek	Maribor	Darja Kapš
2005	Ptuj	Jure Borišek	Ptuj	Jana Krivec
2006	Ljubljana	Duško Pavasovič	Ljubljana	Jana Krivec
2007	Ljubljana	Duško Pavasovič	Ljubljana	Vesna Rožič
2008	Ljubljana	Luka Lenič	Ljubljana	Ana Srebrnič
2009	Otočec	Luka Lenič	Otočec	Jana Krivec
2010	Ljubljana	Luka Lenič	Ljubljana	Vesna Rožič
2011	Ljubljana	Alexander Beliavsky	Ljubljana	Špela Kolarič
2012	Ljubljana	Žan Tomazini	Ljubljana	Ana Srebrnič
2013	Ljubljana	Luka Lenič	Ljubljana	Laura Unuk
2014		Matej Šebenik	Moravske Toplice	Špela Kolarič
2015	Ptuj	Marko Tratar	Ljubljana	Ivana Hreščak
2016	Otočec	Žan Tomazini	Otočec	Špela Kolarič
2017	Maribor	Jure Škoberne	Maribor	Teja Vidic
2018	Ljubljana	Boris Markoja	Ljubljana	Lara Janželj
2019	Radenci	Boris Markoja	Radenci	Monika Rozman
2020	Portorož	Vid Dobrovoljc	Portorož	Ivana Hreščak
2021	Otočec	Maj Zirkelbach	Otočec	Zala Urh
2022	Radenci	Matej Šebenik	Radenci	Petra Kejžar
2023	Radenci	Jure Škoberne	Radenci	Barbara Skuhala
2024	Ljubljana	Jan Šubelj	Ljubljana	Teja Vidic
2025	Maribor	Aljoša Tomazini	Maribor	Teja Vidic

== See also ==
- Yugoslav Chess Championship
