= Vidmar Memorial =

The Milan Vidmar Memorial is a strong closed chess tournament commemorating Milan Vidmar (1885–1962), a leading Slovenian grandmaster.

== History ==
The tournament has been held mostly in a biannual rhythm in several Slovenian cities, i.e.: Ljubljana, Portorož, Rogaška Slatina, Bled, and Ptuj.

The first Vidmar Memorial was held in 2–20 June 1969 in Ljubljana as an international invitation tournament: Albin Planinc emerged as sensational winner.

The event in 1995 at Ptuj was a Zonal Tournament, with Stefan Kindermann who did win, Viktor Korchnoi, and Thomas Luther earning a spot in a round robin of players from Germany, Austria, Switzerland, and Slovenia to advance (due to the split of FIDE in 1993, the World Chess Championship cycles collapsed and it turned out that there were no longer Interzonals to be held).

From 2007 (17th edition, ten players from Slovenia) to 2011 (19th edition), the Vidmar Memorial claim was occasionally, but not regularly used for the National Chess Championship of Slovenia.

In 2016, the jubilee Vidmar Memorial XX is organised again as an international invitation tournament.

== Winners ==
#	Year	City	Winner
1	1969	Ljubljana	Albin Planinc (Yugoslavia)
2	1973	Ljubljana, Portorož	Lajos Portisch (Hungary)
3	1975	Portorož, Ljubljana	Anatoly Karpov (Soviet Union)
4	1977	Ljubljana, Portorož	Bent Larsen (Denmark)
5	1979	Bled, Portorož	Jan Timman (Netherlands)
6	1985	Portorož, Ljubljana	Lajos Portisch (Hungary), Zoltán Ribli (Hungary), Anthony Miles (England)
7	1987	Portorož, Ljubljana	Ivan Sokolov (Yugoslavia), Uwe Bönsch (East Germany)
8	1989	Ljubljana, Rogaška Slatina	Predrag Nikolić (Yugoslavia)
9	1991	Bled, Rogaška Slatina	Predrag Nikolić (Yugoslavia)
10	1993	Portorož, Rogaška Slatina	Ivan Sokolov (Bosnia and Herzegovina)
11	1995	Ptuj (Zonal)	Stefan Kindermann (Germany)
12	1997	Portorož	Vadim Zviagintsev (Russia)
13	1999	Portorož	Alexander Beliavsky (Slovenia)
14	2001	Portorož	Alexander Beliavsky (Slovenia)
15	2003	Portorož	Alexander Beliavsky (Slovenia), Emil Sutovsky (Israel)
16	2005	Portorož	Alexander Beliavsky (Slovenia)
17	2007	Ljubljana (National Championship)	Duško Pavasovič (Slovenia)
18	2009	Otočec (National Championship)	Luka Lenič (Slovenia)
19	2011	Ljubljana (National Championship)	Alexander Beliavsky (Slovenia)
20	2016	Bled	Andrei Volokitin (Ukraine)
