= Albin Planinc =

Slovenian chess grandmaster (1944–2008)

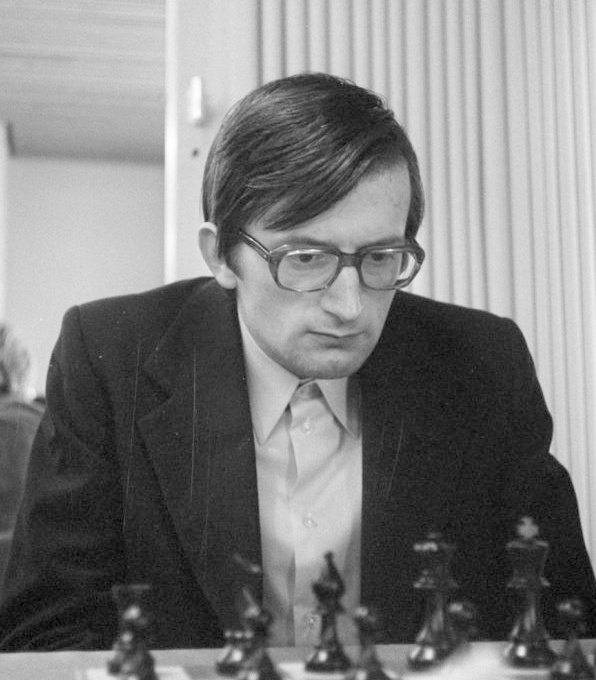
- Planinc in 1974

Personal information
- Born: 18 April 1944 Briše, Slovenia
- Died: 20 December 2008 (aged 64) Ljubljana, Slovenia

Chess career
- Title: Grandmaster (1972)
- Peak rating: 2545 (May 1974)
- Peak ranking: No. 36 (May 1974)

Albin Planinc (also spelled Planinec) (18 April 1944 – 20 December 2008) was a Slovenian-Yugoslavian chess Grandmaster.

He was born in a working-class family in Briše near Zagorje in the Central Sava Valley, in German-occupied Slovenia.

Planinc won the Slovenian youth championship in 1962. He also won the full Slovenian Chess Championship in 1968 and 1971.

His earliest international success occurred at the first Vidmar Memorial at Ljubljana 1969. However, his best result was achieved at the Amsterdam (IBM tournament) 1973, where he shared first place with Tigran Petrosian, ahead of Lubomir Kavalek, Boris Spassky and László Szabó. He also tied for 2nd–4th at Čačak 1969, won at Varna 1970, shared 1st at Čačak 1970, took 9th at Vršac (Kostić Memorial, Henrique Mecking won), tied for 2nd–3rd at Skopje 1971, tied for 3rd–5th at Wijk aan Zee 1974 (Corus chess tournament, Walter Browne won), took 6th at Hastings 1974/75 (Hastings International Chess Congress, Vlastimil Hort won), tied for 2nd–3rd at Štip 1978, and took 12th at Polanica Zdrój 1979 (17th Rubinstein Memorial).

Planinc played on fourth board (+9 –1 =5) for Yugoslavia in the 21st Chess Olympiad in Nice in 1974, where he won a team silver medal.

He was awarded the GM title in 1972. However, he subsequently became a chess coach when the strain of tournament play began contributing to his poor mental health, which proved resistant to the medications available at the time. Planinc continued to suffer from severe depression for decades, spending the last years of his life at a mental institution in Ljubljana. In 1993, his last name was changed to Planinec by mistake.

In The Penguin Encyclopedia of Chess, Grandmaster Raymond Keene said of Planinc, "he specializes in apparently outdated openings into which his imaginative play infuses new life".

Mentally ill in his later years, he died in a nursing home in Ljubljana, Slovenia.
