= Jure Škoberne =

Slovenian chess grandmaster (born 1987)

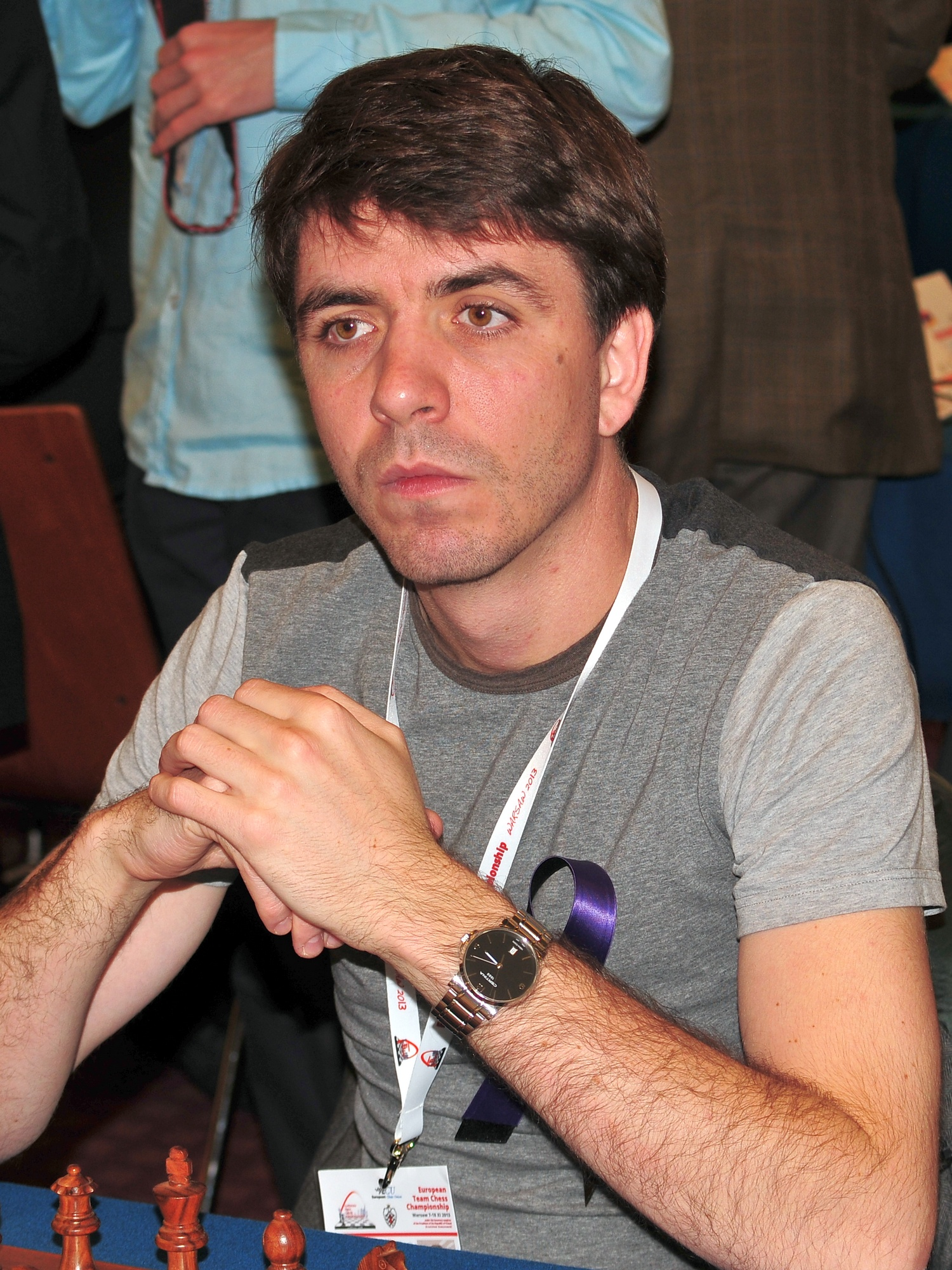

Personal information
- Born: March 20, 1987 (age 39) Šempeter pri Gorici, Slovenia

Chess career
- Country: Slovenia
- Title: Grandmaster (2010)
- FIDE rating: 2555 (July 2026)
- Peak rating: 2582 (December 2018)

Jure Škoberne is a Slovenian chess grandmaster.

== Chess career ==
He won the Slovenian Chess Championship in 2017 and 2023.

In February 2011, he won the Hit International Chess Tournament in Nova Gorica.

In December 2015, he tied for 1st–5th with Alexander Zubarev, Olexandr Bortnyk, Lei Tingjie, and Maximilian Neef in the 32nd Böblingen International Open scoring 7/9 points.

In May 2023, he tied for first place with Domen Tisaj in the Slovenian Chess Championship, but became the champion after having a better tiebreak score.

In May 2024, he finished second in the 8th Zlatka Bašagića Memorial Blitz Rating Open with a score of 7/9.
