= Ana Srebrnič =

Slovenian chess player (born 1984)

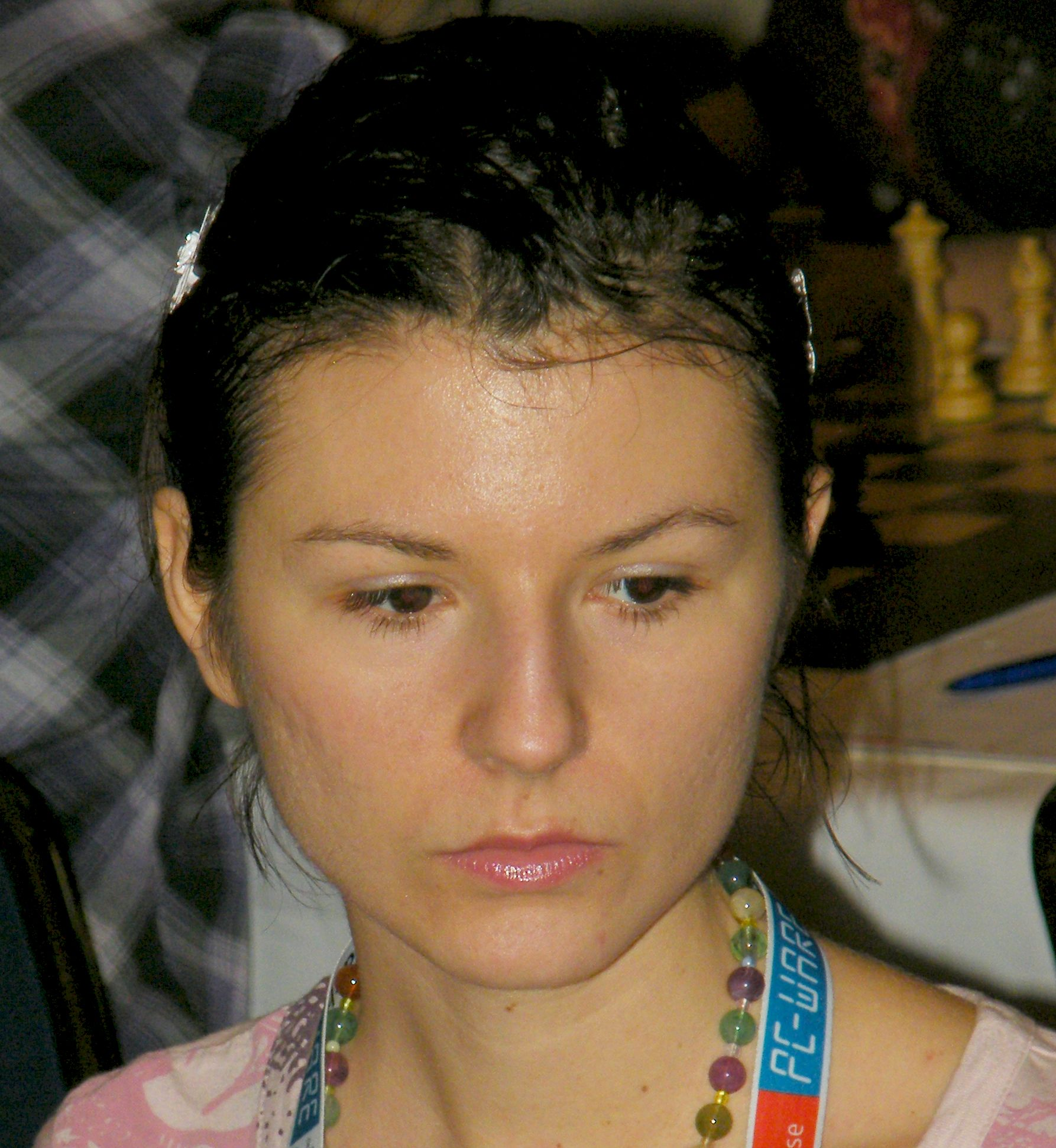
- Srebrnič in 2008

Personal information
- Born: 20 February 1984 (age 42) Ljubljana, SR Slovenia, SFR Yugoslavia
- Spouse: Robert Markuš

Chess career
- Country: Slovenia
- Title: Woman Grandmaster (2006)
- Peak rating: 2318 (July 2006)

Ana Srebrnič (born 20 February 1984) is a Slovenian chess player. She was awarded the title of Woman Grandmaster (WGM) by FIDE in 2006.

She was Slovenian women's champion in 2008 and 2012, runner-up in 2004, bronze medalist in 2005. In 2003, she won the 1st Mediterranean Girls Junior Championship in Ajelat, and took the bronze medal in the Mediterranean women's championship held in Beirut.

Srebrnič played for the Slovenian team in the Women's Chess Olympiad (in 2002, 2004, 2006, 2008, 2012 and 2014) the Women's European Team Chess Championship, the Women's Mitropa Cup and the European U18 Girls Team Chess Championship. She was on the team Slovenia 1 which gold medal at the Women's Mitropa Cup in 2009.

Srebrnič also holds the titles of FIDE Trainer and International Arbiter, which FIDE awarded her in 2014 and 2015 respectively.
