= Duško Pavasovič =

Slovenian chess grandmaster (born 1976)

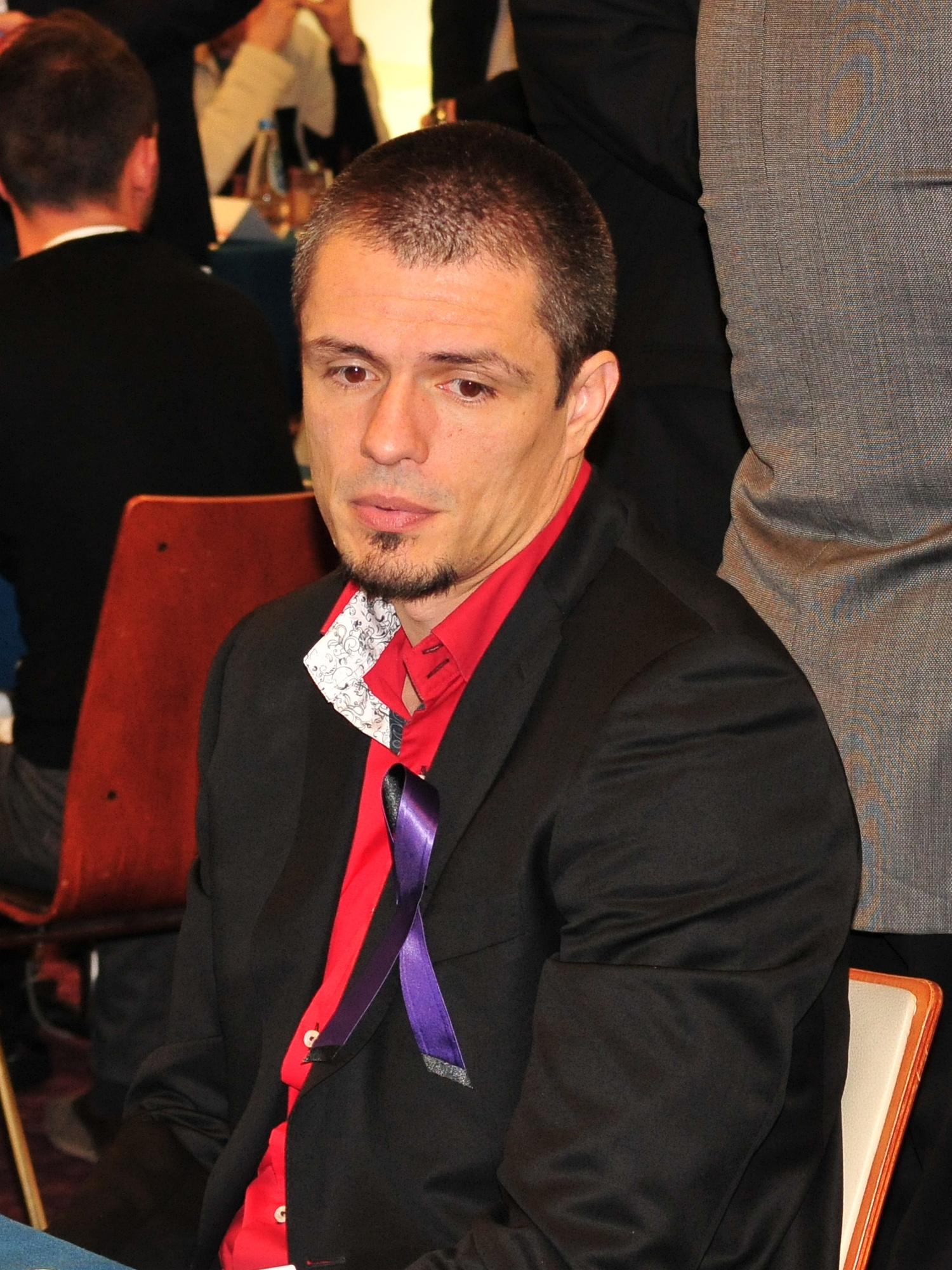
- Duško Pavasovič, Warsaw 2013

Personal information
- Born: 15 October 1976 (age 49) Split, SR Croatia, SFR Yugoslavia

Chess career
- Country: Slovenia
- Title: Grandmaster (1999)
- FIDE rating: 2517 (July 2026)
- Peak rating: 2615 (January 2004)
- Peak ranking: No. 86 (January 2004)

Duško Pavasovič (born 15 October 1976) is a Slovenian chess player. He holds the title of Grandmaster, which FIDE awarded him in 1999.

Pavasovič was born in Split, Croatia (then Yugoslavia), and later took Slovenian citizenship. He won the Slovenian Championships of 1999 and 2006. Pavasovič took the national champion title again in 2007, when he won the Vidmar Memorial in Ljubljana. In the same year he finished fourth in the European Individual Chess Championship with a performance rating of 2765. Pavasovič played for the Slovenian national team in the Chess Olympiad, European Team Chess Championship and Mitropa Cup.

Pavosavič, alongside fellow Slovenian grandmaster Luka Lenič, also co-founded the company Kings of Games and created the mobile chess game Chess Universe.
