= Vesna Rožič =

Slovenian chess player (1987–2013)

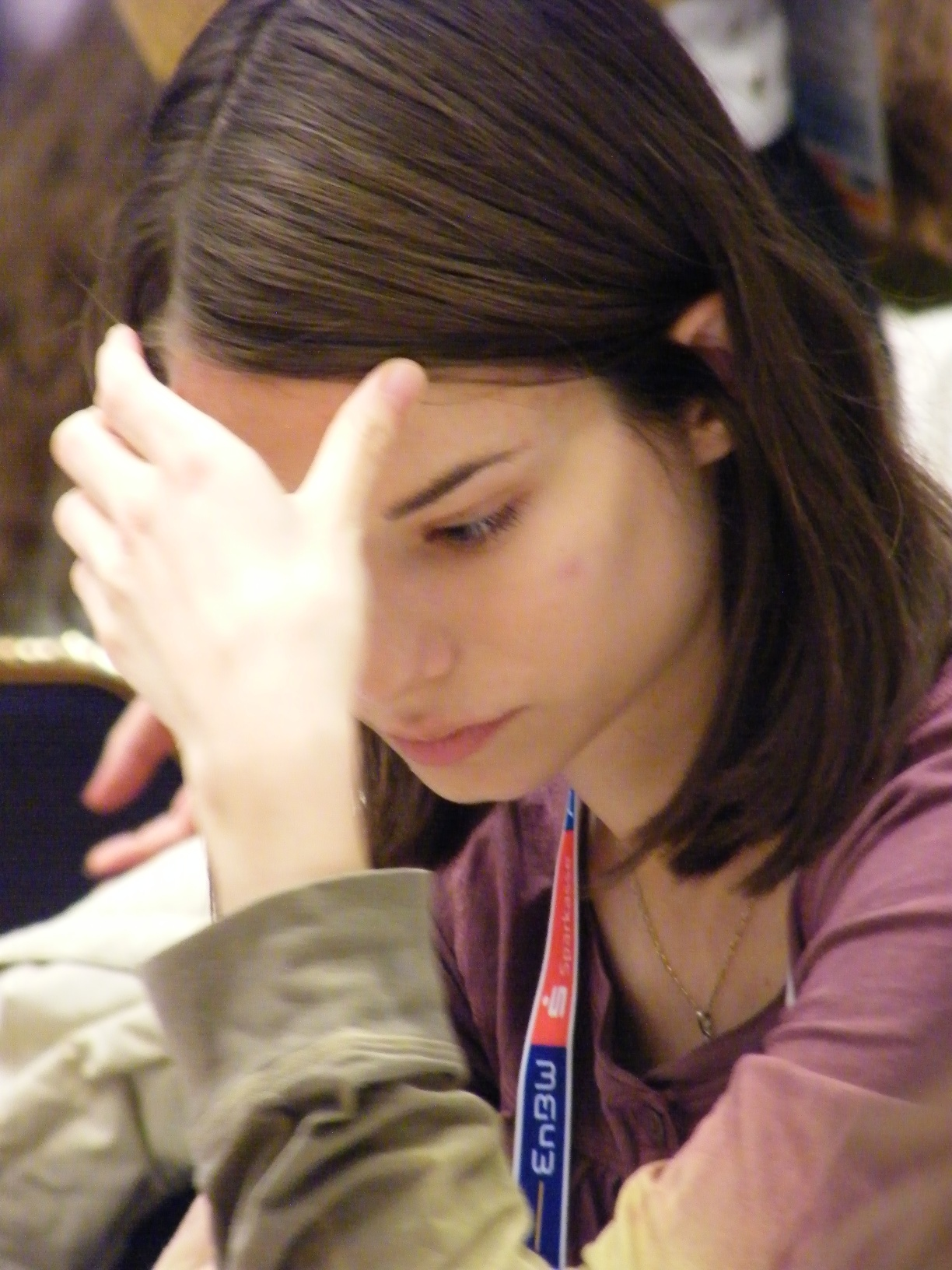
- Rožič in 2008

Personal information
- Born: 23 March 1987 Ljubljana, SR Slovenia, SFR Yugoslavia
- Died: 23 August 2013 (aged 26) Burghausen, Germany

Chess career
- Country: Slovenia
- Title: Woman International Master (2006)
- Peak rating: 2310 (July 2011)

Vesna Rožič (23 March 1987 – 23 August 2013) was a Slovenian chess player. She received the FIDE title of Woman International Master (WIM) in April 2006. Rožič was ranked the second best Slovenian female chess player, after Anna Muzychuk. She won the Slovenian women's championship in 2007 and 2010. In 2007, Rožič also became the Mediterranean women's champion in Antalya. In team events, she represented Slovenia in four Women's Chess Olympiads (2002, 2008, 2010 and 2012), four Women's European Team Chess Championships (2005, 2007, 2009 and 2011), six Women's Mitropa Cups (2005, 2006, 2007, 2009, 2010 and 2012) and four European Girls U18 Team Championships (2001, 2002, 2003 and 2004). In the Women's Mitropa Cup, Rožič won two team golds (in 2005 and 2006), four team silvers (in 2007, 2009, 2010 and 2012) and two individual gold medals (in 2006 and 2012).

Rožič frequently played the Queen's Pawn Game with white pieces, and the French Defence with black pieces.

Rožič died from peritoneal cancer on 23 August 2013.
