= Darja Kapš =

Slovenian chess player (born 1981)

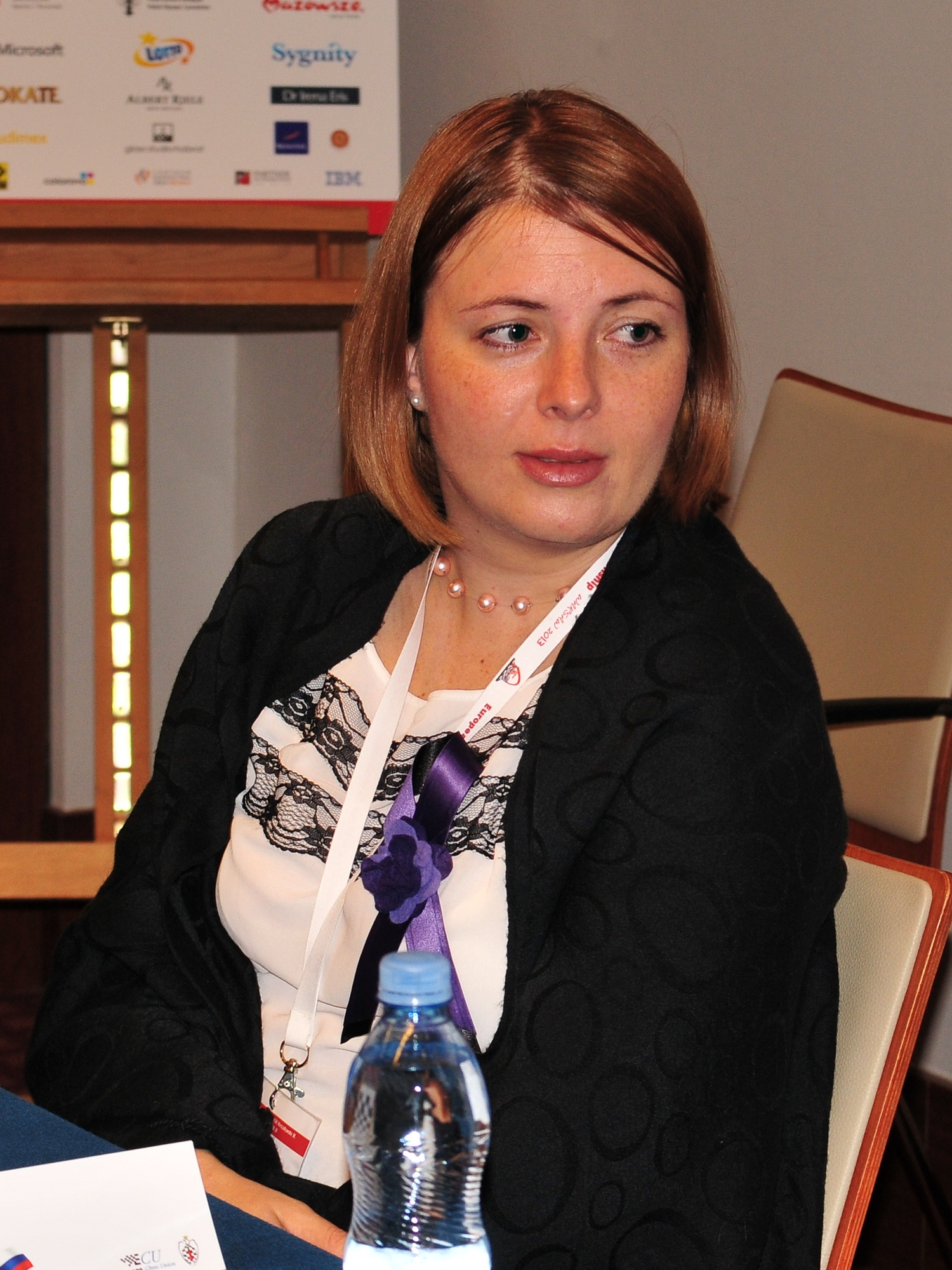
- Darja Kapš, Warsaw 2013

Personal information
- Born: November 26, 1981 (age 44) Novo Mesto, SR Slovenia, SFR Yugoslavia

Chess career
- Country: Slovenia
- Title: Woman Grandmaster (2005)
- Peak rating: 2319 (July 2005)

Darja Kapš (born November 26, 1981) is a Slovene chess player with the title of Woman Grandmaster.

Kapš played for the Slovenian Olympic team in 35th Chess Olympiad, 36th Chess Olympiad and 39th Chess Olympiad. She won the Woman Slovenian Chess Championship in 2001 and 2004.
