= Alexander Zubarev =

Ukrainian chess grandmaster (born 1979)

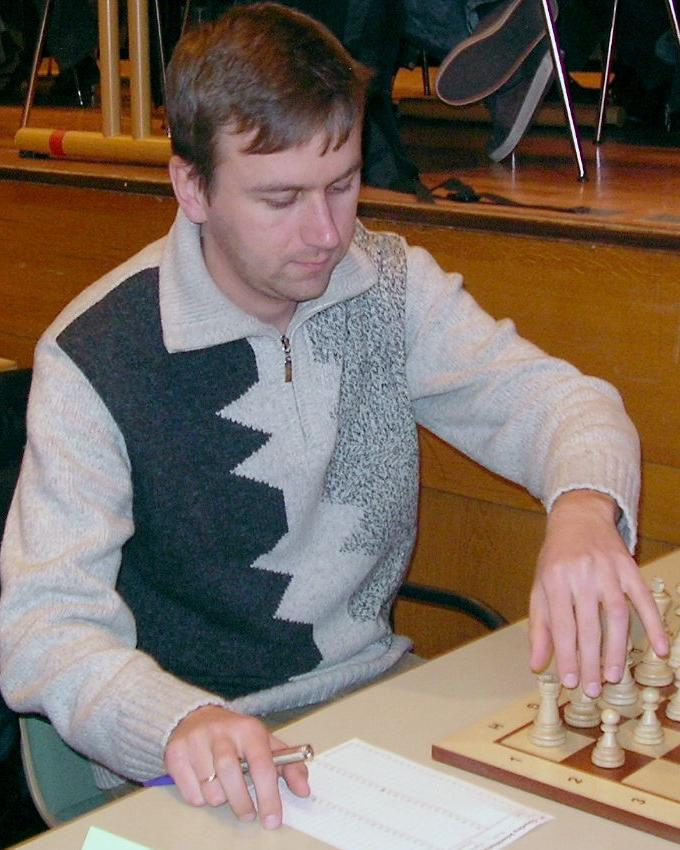

Personal information
- Born: Olexander Volodymyrovych Zubarev; 17 December 1979 (age 46)

Chess career
- Country: Ukraine
- Title: Grandmaster (2002)
- Peak rating: 2608 (September 2011)

Alexander Volodymyrovych Zubarev (Ukrainian: Олександр Володимирович Зубарєв, Oleksandr Volodimirovich Zubarev; born 17 December 1979) is a Ukrainian chess grandmaster (2002).

In 2008 he tied for 4–8th with Tamaz Gelashvili, Anton Filippov, Constantin Lupulescu and Nidjat Mamedov in the Open Romgaz Tournament in Bucharest. In 2010 he came first at Ambès and won the 6th Anatoly Ermak Cup in Zaporizhia. In the same year he tied for 1st–3rd with Dmitry Svetushkin and Yuriy Kryvoruchko at Palaiochora. In 2011 he tied for 1st–2nd with Sergey Kasparov at Bad Woerishofen. In 2015 Zubarev won the 32nd Böblingen Open edging out on tiebreak Olexandr Bortnyk, Jure Škoberne, Maximilian Neef and Lei Tingjie, after all five players finished on 7/9 points.
