= Dražen Sermek =

Slovenian chess grandmaster (born 1969)

Personal information
- Born: 30 January 1969 (age 57) Osijek, Socialist Republic of Croatia, Yugoslavia

Chess career
- Country: Yugoslavia → Slovenia; Croatia
- Title: Grandmaster (1994)
- FIDE rating: 2471 (July 2026)
- Peak rating: 2603 (July 2002)
- Peak ranking: No. 92 (July 2002)

Dražen Sermek (born 30 January 1969) is a Croatian chess player. He holds the title of Grandmaster, which FIDE awarded him in 1994. He previously competed for Slovenia.

Sermek won the Slovenian Chess Championship in 1993 and 1998 and was a member of the Slovenian team in the Chess Olympiads of 1994, 2000, 2002, 2004 and 2006.

He tied for 1st–4th with Michele Godena, Andrei Sokolov and Xie Jun at Cannes 1997. In 2001 Sermek came first in the Pula Open. In 2002, he won the New White Plus GM tournament in Dhaka. In 2008, he tied for 3rd–7th places with Marat Dzhumaev, Darwin Laylo, Susanto Megaranto and Ashot Nadanian in the 5th Dato' Arthur Tan Malaysia Open Championship in Kuala Lumpur and came first in the MCF GM Tournament, which was also held in Kuala Lumpur.
