= Emir Dizdarević =

Bosnian chess grandmaster (born 1958)

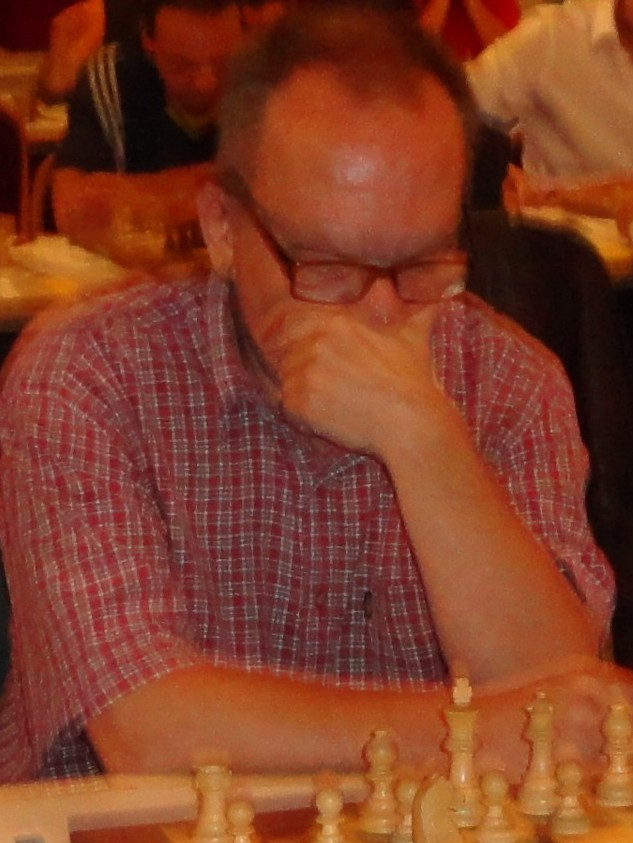
- Emir Dizdarević in 2015

Personal information
- Born: 2 April 1958 (age 68) Zenica, Bosnia and Herzegovina

Chess career
- Country: Yugoslavia; Bosnia and Herzegovina; Croatia
- Title: Grandmaster (1988)
- Peak rating: 2555 (July 1997)

Emir Dizdarević (born 2 April 1958), is a Bosnian Grandmaster (GM) (1988), two-times Bosnia and Herzegovina Chess Championship winner (2011, 2012) and a Chess Olympiad team silver medalist (1994).

== Biography ==
Emir Dizdarević made his first major success in chess tournaments in the 1980s. In 1987, he shared the 1st place in the International Chess Tournament in Pleven. In 1988, in Sarajevo Emir Dizdarević shared 1st - 3nd place in the International Chess Tournament Bosna. In 1989, he shared 2nd place in International Chess Tournament in Zenica. In 1992, Dizdarević won the International Chess Tournament in Ljubljana. In 2000, in New Delhi Emir Dizdarević participated in the FIDE World Chess Championship in which he won the 1st round to Lev Psakhis but lost to Boris Gelfand in the 2nd round. Emir Dizdarević won the Bosnia and Herzegovina Chess Championship two times in a row (2011, 2012). In 2014, he won the Bosnian International Chess Tournament Bošnjaci. In 2022, he won the 8th Ekrem Galijatovic Memorial championship of Sarajevo.

Emir Dizdarević played for Bosnia and Herzegovina in the Chess Olympiads:

- In 1992, at fourth board in the 30th Chess Olympiad in Manila (+6, =6, -2),
- In 1994, at fourth board in the 31st Chess Olympiad in Moscow (+4, =7, -1) and won team silver medal,
- In 1996, at fourth board in the 32nd Chess Olympiad in Yerevan (+6, =8, -0),
- In 1998, at fourth board in the 33rd Chess Olympiad in Elista (+4, =4, -4),
- In 2000, at fourth board in the 34th Chess Olympiad in Istanbul (+2, =8, -1),
- In 2002, at fourth board in the 35th Chess Olympiad in Bled (+1, =4, -3),
- In 2004, at first board in the 36th Chess Olympiad in Calvià (+2, =7, -2),
- In 2010, at fourth board in the 39th Chess Olympiad in Khanty-Mansiysk (+0, =7, -0),
- In 2012, at second board in the 40th Chess Olympiad in Istanbul (+3, =2, -4),
- In 2014, at second board in the 41st Chess Olympiad in Tromsø (+2, =4, -2),
- In 2016, at fourth board in the 42nd Chess Olympiad in Baku (+3, =1, -2),
- In 2018, at third board in the 43rd Chess Olympiad in Batumi (+0, =4, -0).

Emir Dizdarević played for Bosnia and Herzegovina in the European Team Chess Championships:

- In 1992, at first reserve board in the 10th European Team Chess Championship in Debrecen (+0, =3, -1),
- In 1997, at fourth board in the 11th European Team Chess Championship in Pula (+4, =3, -2),
- In 1999, at fourth board in the 12th European Team Chess Championship in Batumi (+3, =4, -1),
- In 2003, at third board in the 14th European Team Chess Championship in Plovdiv (+4, =4, -1),
- In 2009, at first board in the 17th European Team Chess Championship in Novi Sad (+3, =3, -3).

In 1982, he was awarded the FIDE International Master (IM) title and received the FIDE Grandmaster (GM) title six years later.
