= Željko Bogut =

Bosnia and Herzegovina chess player

Personal information
- Born: October 8, 1969 (age 57) Mostar, SR Bosnia and Herzegovina, then Yugoslavia

Chess career
- Country: Bosnia and Herzegovina
- Title: International Master (2007)
- FIDE rating: 2380 (October 2021)
- Peak rating: 2468 (March 2010)

Željko Bogut (born October 8, 1969, in Mostar, SR Bosnia and Herzegovina, Yugoslavia) is a Bosnian-Herzegovinian chess player and two time national champion, only player in Bosnia and Herzegovina who won title twice, in 2006 and in 2010. This second time earned him GM norm.

== Biography ==
Željko Bogut was born in Mostar. He learned to play chess as a five-year-old and became an active chess player in 1994, when he started playing for Hšk Zrinjski Mostar. His first major win was achieved in Herzegovina in 1987. He played for Hšk Zrinjski Mostar until 1997. During that time, he was the champion of Herzeg-Bosnia in 1995 and tied for first place in the same contest in 1996. The same year he won an international tournament in Biel and in 1997, won the Open Tournament H-B in Mostar. In 1997 he changed his club to ŠK Široki Brijeg. From 1997 on, he won the Open Tournament of Dubrovnik in 2003 and became the champion of Bosnia and Herzegovina. He won a lot of rapid tournaments while representing each of his clubs.

In team chess, he took part in three Chess Olympiads, in Calviá, Turin and Dresden, playing for Bosnia and Herzegovina. He alao took part in two European Team Chess Championships, in Crete and Novi Sad. Other than playing club chess, he has also opened a chess school. He currently has 2468 points on the ELO list which is his highest rating ever.

== Private life ==
Bogut is married and has four children. His occupation is a lawyer and he works in the Ministry of Justice, Sarajevo.

== Notable tournament and match records ==
- 1996 Biel I
- 2003 Dubrovnik I
- 2004 Calviá (Chess Olympiad)
- 2005 Bosnia and Herzegovina Championship, Brčko IV
- 2006 Turin (Chess Olympiad)
- 2006 Bosnia and Herzegovina Championship, Vitez I
- 2007 Bosnia and Herzegovina Championship, Sarajevo V-VI
- 2008 Dresden (Chess Olympiad)
- 2010 Bošnjaci I-II
- 2010 Bosnia and Herzegovina Championship, Široki Brijeg I

== Sample game ==
Position: f8 black rook, d7 white queen, e7 black bishop, h7 black king, d6 black pawn, g6 black pawn, h6 white pawn, d5 white pawn, f5 black pawn, d4 white bishop, h4 black queen, c3 white pawn, f3 black pawn, a2 white pawn, a1 white king, c1 white rook

In this position after move 35 in the 2008 17th Croatian team Championship - 1B League game between Željko Bogut and Murtas Kazhgaleyev, Kazhgaleyev (Black) makes crucial mistake and Bogut manages to capture his rook.

In round 3 of 17th Croatian team Championship - 1B League in 2008, Bogut defeated 84th player on the July 2008 FIDE list Murtas Kazhgaleyev with the white pieces in a Sicilian defense.

1. e4 c5 2. Nf3 d6 3. Bb5+ Nc6 4. d4 cxd4 5. Qxd4 Bd7 6. Bxc6 Bxc6 7. Nc3 h6 8. Be3 e5 9. Qd3 Nf6 10. O-O-O Be7 11. h3 Rc8 12. Kb1 b5 13. Nd2 b4 14. Nd5 Nxd5 15. exd5 Ba4 16. Rc1 O-O 17. g4 Qd7 18. Ne4 a5 19. Rhg1 Bb5 20. Qd2 a4 21. g5 Kh7 22. h4 b3 23. gxh6 g6 24. Bg5 bxc2+ 25. Rxc2 Qf5 26. Nc3 Rxc3 27. bxc3 f6 28. Be3 Bd3 29. Rgc1 Qe4 30. Ka1 Bxc2 31. Qxc2 Qxh4 32. f4 exf4 33. Qxa4 f5 34. Bd4 f3 35. Qd7 Kxh6 36. Bf2 Rd8 37. Qe6 Qxf2 38. Qxe7 Kh5 39. Qxd8 g5 40. Qxd6 Qd2 41. Rh1+ Kg4 42. Rg1+ Kh5 43. Qe5 f2 44. Qe8+ Kh6 45. Rh1+ Kg7 46. Qh8+ 1-0
