= Jana Krivec =

Slovenian chess player (born 1980)

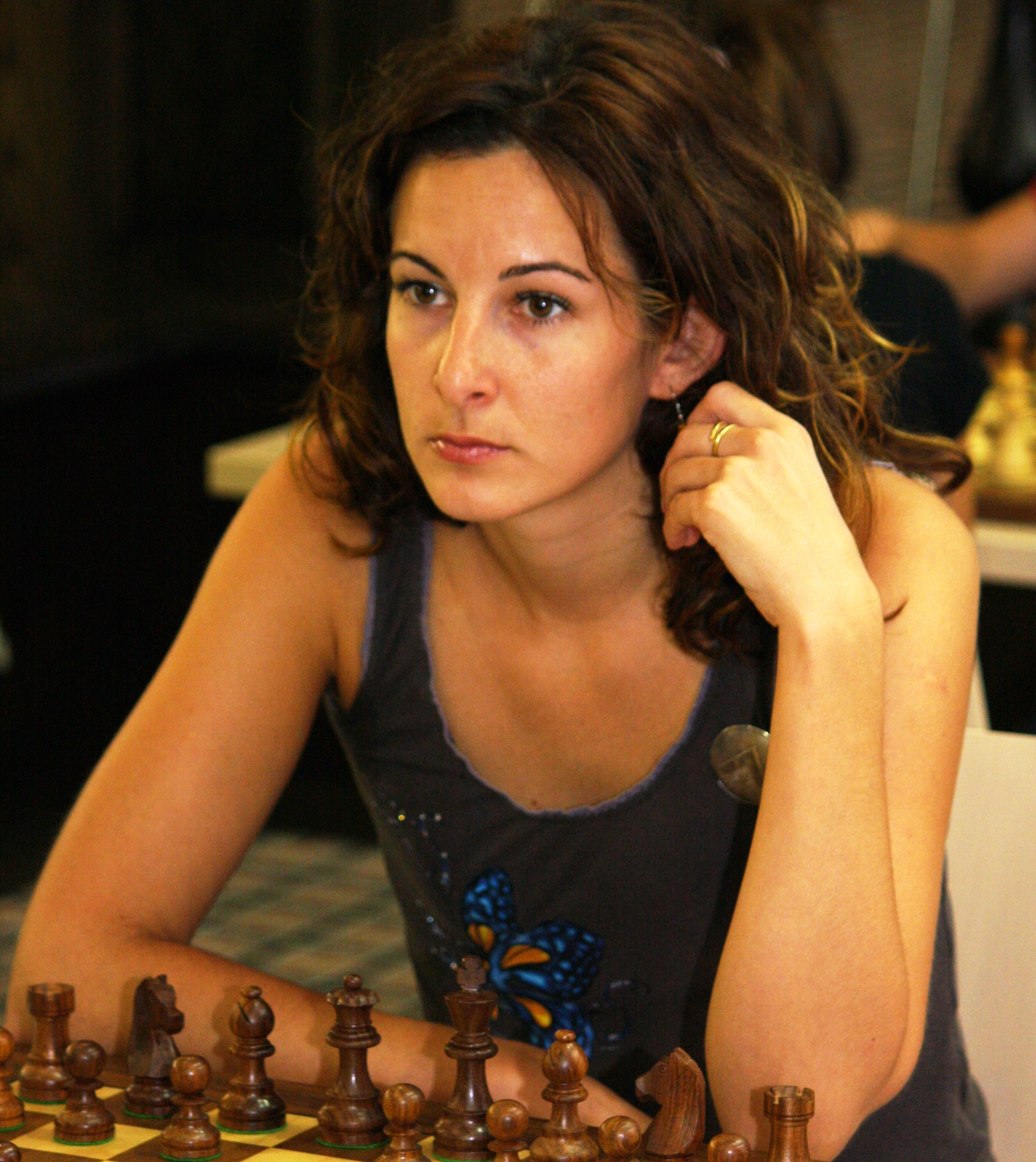
- Jana Krivec (Otočec 2009)

Personal information
- Born: May 30, 1980 (age 46) Šempeter pri Gorici, SR Slovenia, SFR Yugoslavia

Chess career
- Country: Slovenia
- Title: Woman Grandmaster (2007)
- FIDE rating: 2213 (December 2021)
- Peak rating: 2362 (April 2008)

Jana Krivec (born May 30, 1980) is a Slovene chess player and a Woman Grandmaster.

She was Slovenian woman champion in 1997, 2000, 2002, 2003, 2005, 2006, and in 2009.

Krivec played for the Slovenian Olympic team in 35th Chess Olympiad, 36th Chess Olympiad, 38th Chess Olympiad and 39th Chess Olympiad.
