= Bosnia and Herzegovina Chess Championship =

Bosnia and Herzegovina

The Bosnia and Herzegovina Chess Championship is the national chess championship of Bosnia and Herzegovina. It was first organised in 2005 by the BIH Chess Union; more than ten years after its independence from Yugoslavia. In the first edition there were six players from Bosnia and Herzegovina and six players from Serbia and Montenegro. The first edition was marked by the absence of leading players such as Borki Predojević, Bojan Kurajica and Emir Dizdarević. The second edition was played with 10 players from Bosnia and Herzegovina and two players from Serbia and Montenegro. The field in the third edition consisted entirely of Bosnia and Herzegovina chess players. With Borki Predojević and Predrag Nikolić participating, it was the strongest edition so far.

== Winners ==
#	Year	City	Champion
1	2005	Brčko	Milan Vukic
2	2006	Vitez	Željko Bogut
3	2007	Sarajevo	Predrag Nikolić
4	2010	Široki Brijeg	Željko Bogut
5	2011	Cazin	Emir Dizdarević
6	2012	Neum	Emir Dizdarević
7	2013	Cazin	Denis Kadrić
8	2014	Zenica	Dalibor Stojanović
9	2016	Lukavac	Goran Trkulja

== Women ==
Year	City	Champion
2008	Ilidža	Elena Borić

== See also ==
- Yugoslav Chess Championship
