= Stefan Kindermann =

Austrian chess grandmaster (born 1959)

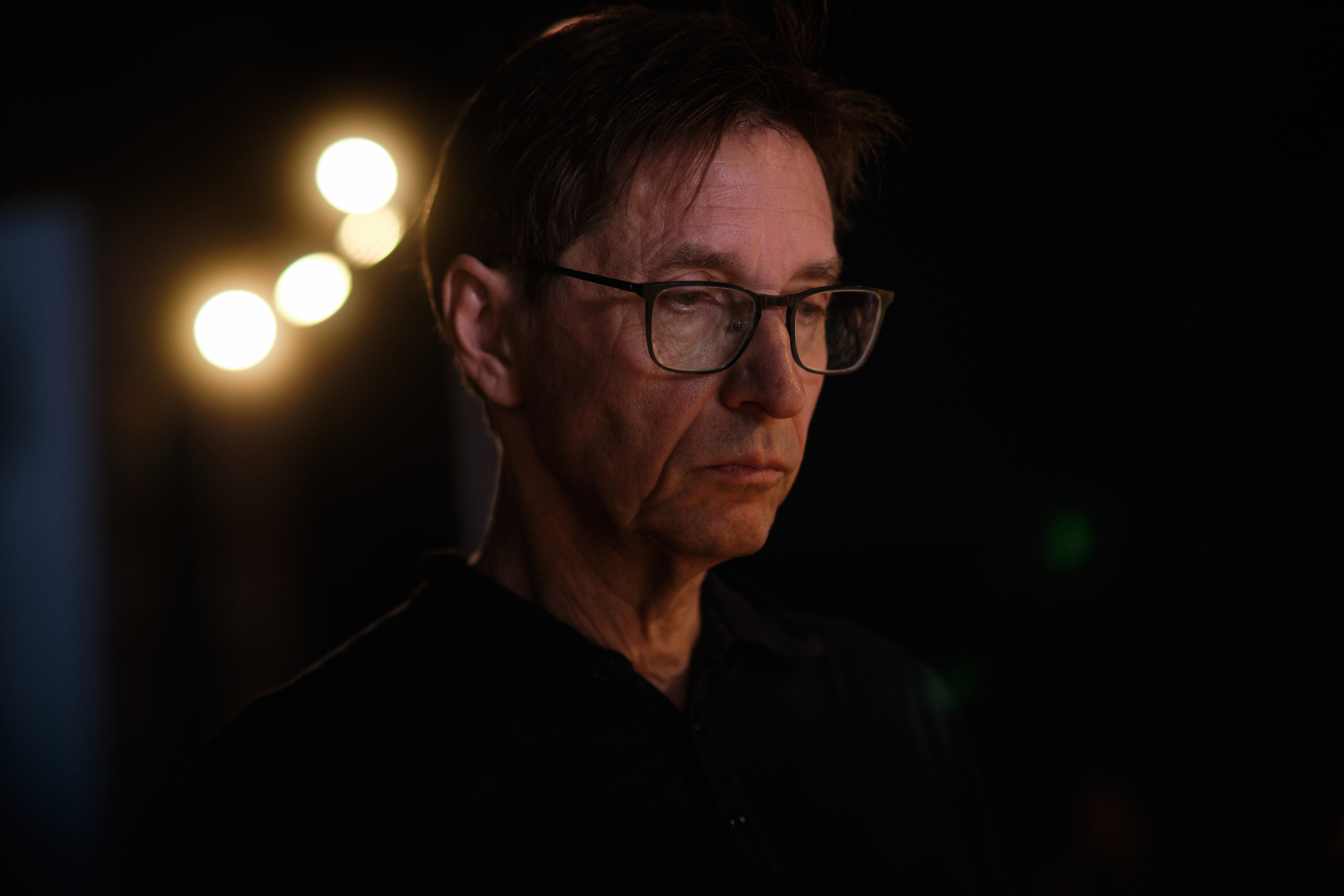
- Stefan Kindermann 2024

Personal information
- Born: Stefan Emanuel Sylvester Kindermann; December 28, 1959 (age 66) Vienna, Austria

Chess career
- Country: Austria
- Title: Grandmaster (1988)
- FIDE rating: 2446 (August 2026)
- Peak rating: 2585 (January 1995)
- Peak ranking: No. 55 (January 1990)

Stefan Emanuel Sylvester Kindermann (born 28 December 1959 in Vienna, Austria) is an Austrian chess Grandmaster. He played in the 1998 FIDE World Chess Championship knockout matches, has represented Germany and Austria in eight Chess Olympiads, and is the author of several chess books.

== Early life ==
Stefan Kindermann's father Gottfried-Karl Kindermann received a professorship in 1967 and moved with his family to Munich. It was there, at the age of twelve, that Stefan Kindermann joined the "Post SV Munich" chess club. In 1978 he won the Dähne Cup and made the decision to become a professional chess player.

== Chess career ==
Among other things, Kindermann finished equal first in Dortmund 1985 and won tournaments in Biel 1986 and Starý Smokovec 1987. In 1988 he was awarded the Grandmaster title. In 1989 he won the chess festival in Bad Wörishofen ahead of Tony Miles and Lucas Brunner. A major success was his first place at the Vidmar Memorial Zonal tournament in Ptuj 1995. He thus qualified for the FIDE World Chess Championship 1998 knock-out tournament, where he was eliminated in the second round by GM Gilberto Milos from Brazil.

Kindermann represented Germany in six Chess Olympiads from 1982 to 1994 and scored 33 points in 56 games. In 2005 he transferred to the Austrian Chess Federation and represented Austria at the Chess Olympiads in Dresden 2008, and Istanbul 2012. His best results were at the 26th Chess Olympiad 1984 and the 28th Chess Olympiad 1988 both held in Thessaloniki, Greece where he scored 7.5/11 both times, and finished 4th and 6th respectively on board 3 for Germany.

He also represented Germany in the European Team Chess Championship twice in 1983 and 1989, and represented Austria two times in 2009 and 2011. He won a team bronze medal and finished fourth on board 4 at the event in Haifa 1989.

Stefan Kindermann appeared on Norddeutscher Rundfunk (NDR) television, playing in series eight of the BBC's The Master Game Tournament in 1983.

Kindermann has played in the German Chess Bundesliga for many years and his team FC Bayern Munich has won the German Team championship nine times. Since 2009 he has been playing for the Munich club MSA Zugzwang. In the Austrian Bundesliga he plays for Merkur Graz and Sparkasse Jenbach.

He is the author of several chess books, including a book on the French Winawer Variation (together with Ulrich Dirr, 2001, ISBN 3-935748-00-0), the Leningrad Dutch (2002, ISBN 3-935748-03-5) and the Spanish Exchange Variation (2005, ISBN 3-283-00469-2). Between 2000 and 2003 he worked for the chess publisher Chessgate. He also writes a weekly chess column for the Süddeutsche Zeitung. In 2010, together with Robert K. von Weizsäcker, he published the book The King plan. Strategies for your Success (ISBN 978-3-498-07370-1). This explains strategic models, developed from chess strategies, in the form of keynote speeches and seminars for executives.

An endgame study, composed by him in the Timman 50 Tourney in 2002, for the 50th birthday of Jan Timman, won first prize. The competition included 95 study composers from 23 countries.

== Personal life ==
Kindermann, graduated in 1996 with a Master of Neuro-linguistic programming, and also works as a personal coach and trainer. Together with Gerald Hertneck, Roman Krulich and Dijana Dengler, he founded the Munich Chess Academy in 2005, and the Munich Chess Foundation, which assists disadvantaged children, in 2007.

He is married and has one daughter.
