= Predrag Nikolić =

Bosnian chess grandmaster (born 1960)

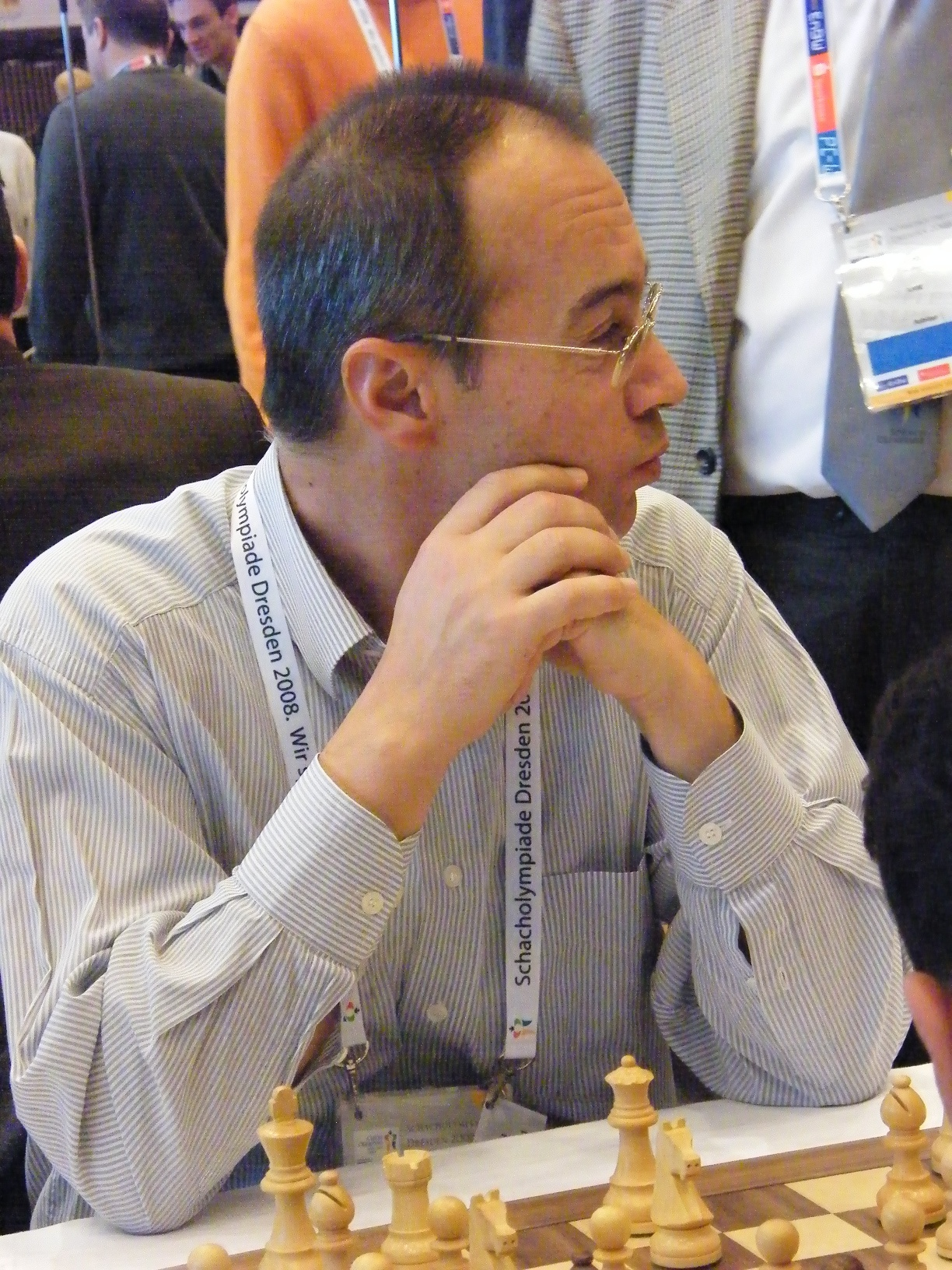
- Nikolić at the Dresden Olympiad in 2008

Personal information
- Born: 11 September 1960 (age 66) Bosanski Šamac, SR Bosnia and Herzegovina, SFR Yugoslavia

Chess career
- Country: Bosnia and Herzegovina
- Title: Grandmaster (1983)
- FIDE rating: 2551 (September 2026)
- Peak rating: 2676 (October 2004)
- Peak ranking: No. 6 (January 1988)

Predrag Nikolić (Serbian Cyrillic: Предраг Николић; born 11 September 1960 in Bosanski Šamac) is a Bosnian Serb chess grandmaster.

== Biography ==
Predrag Nikolić
Medal record

Representing Yugoslavia

Men's chess

Olympiad
| Bronze medal – third place | 1980 Valletta | Open team |
| Gold medal – first place | 1980 Valletta | Individual 2nd reserve |

World Championship
| Silver medal – second place | 1989 Lucerne | Open team |
| Silver medal – second place | 1989 Lucerne | Individual board 2 |

European Championship
| Silver medal – second place | 1983 Plovdiv | Open team |
| Gold medal – first place | 1983 Plovdiv | Individual board 3 |

Representing Bosnia and Herzegovina

Men's chess

Olympiad
| Silver medal – second place | 1994 Moscow | Open team |

He first competed for the Yugoslav Championship in 1979, taking a share of second place. The following year and again in 1984, he went one step further and became the Yugoslav national champion. He was awarded the International Master and Grandmaster titles in 1980 and 1983 respectively. The GM title was earned from his 1982 performances in Sarajevo (third) and Sochi (second after Mikhail Tal).

He was a winner at Sarajevo in 1983, at Novi Sad in 1984 and at Reykjavík two years later. 1986 was also the year that he shared second place behind Nigel Short at Wijk aan Zee. He returned to winning ways at Sarajevo in 1987 and at the Zagreb Interzonal, narrowly failed to qualify for the Candidates Tournament (sharing fourth place behind Korchnoi, Ehlvest and Seirawan).

In 1989, he won at Wijk aan Zee (jointly with Anand, Ribli and Sax) and took first place at Portorož/Ljubljana (the Vidmar Memorial tournament). There followed the 1990 Interzonal in Manila, where once more he shared fourth place, but qualified this time for the 1991 Candidates tournament. During his 'final 16' encounter with Boris Gelfand, he was just edged out in a rapid play-off, having drawn the match 4-4. Later, he journeyed to São Paulo for a match with Henrique Mecking and secured victory by a score of 3.5-2.5. A tournament win in Bled saw him complete an eventful year.

While playing the Buenos Aires tournament of 1992 (where he finished second), war broke out in his home country and for a while he was domiciled in the Netherlands, along with the Bosnian Ivan Sokolov. They also spendt some time in the Faroe Islands. There were more tournament victories to come; first at Wijk aan Zee in 1994 and as winner of the national Dutch Chess Championships of 1997 (equal with Jan Timman but winning the play-off) and 1999. In 2004, he shared a major success with Vassily Ivanchuk when they tied for first place at the European Individual Chess Championship, held in Antalya, although he lost the play-off for the title.

Between 1980 and 2002, he was, with the exception of 1982, an ever-present member of the Yugoslav and then Bosnian Chess Olympiad teams, winning one medal of each colour - team silver, team bronze and individual gold. He also participated regularly at the European Team Chess Championship and in 1983, took team silver and individual gold medals.

He has played for many years in the Bundesliga for club side SG Aljechin Solingen. At the start of the 2006/7 season, he was their highest rated player and listed as number 2 behind Artur Yusupov. In 2007 he won the Bosnia and Herzegovina Chess Championship ahead of Borki Predojević.

In 2015 he won the World Senior Championship's over-50 (+50) section in Acqui Terme.

Predrag Nikolić is now living in the Netherlands near Leiden, and in Bosnia and Herzegovina.

== Notable games ==
- Predrag Nikolic vs Georgy Timoshenko, GMA-qual f 1990, King's Indian Defense: Fianchetto Variation, Immediate Fianchetto (E60), 1-0
- Predrag Nikolic vs Jeroen Piket, Corus 2000, Queen's Gambit Declined: Orthodox Defense, Rubinstein Variation Flohr Line (D62), 1-0
- Mikhail Krasenkow vs Predrag Nikolic, Bled Olympiad 2002, Slav Defense: Winawer Countergambit (D10), 0-1
- Predrag Nikolic vs David Navara, FIDE World Cup 2005, Benoni Defense: Fianchetto Variation, Hastings Defense (A63), 1-0
