= Zbyněk Hráček =

Czech chess grandmaster (born 1970)

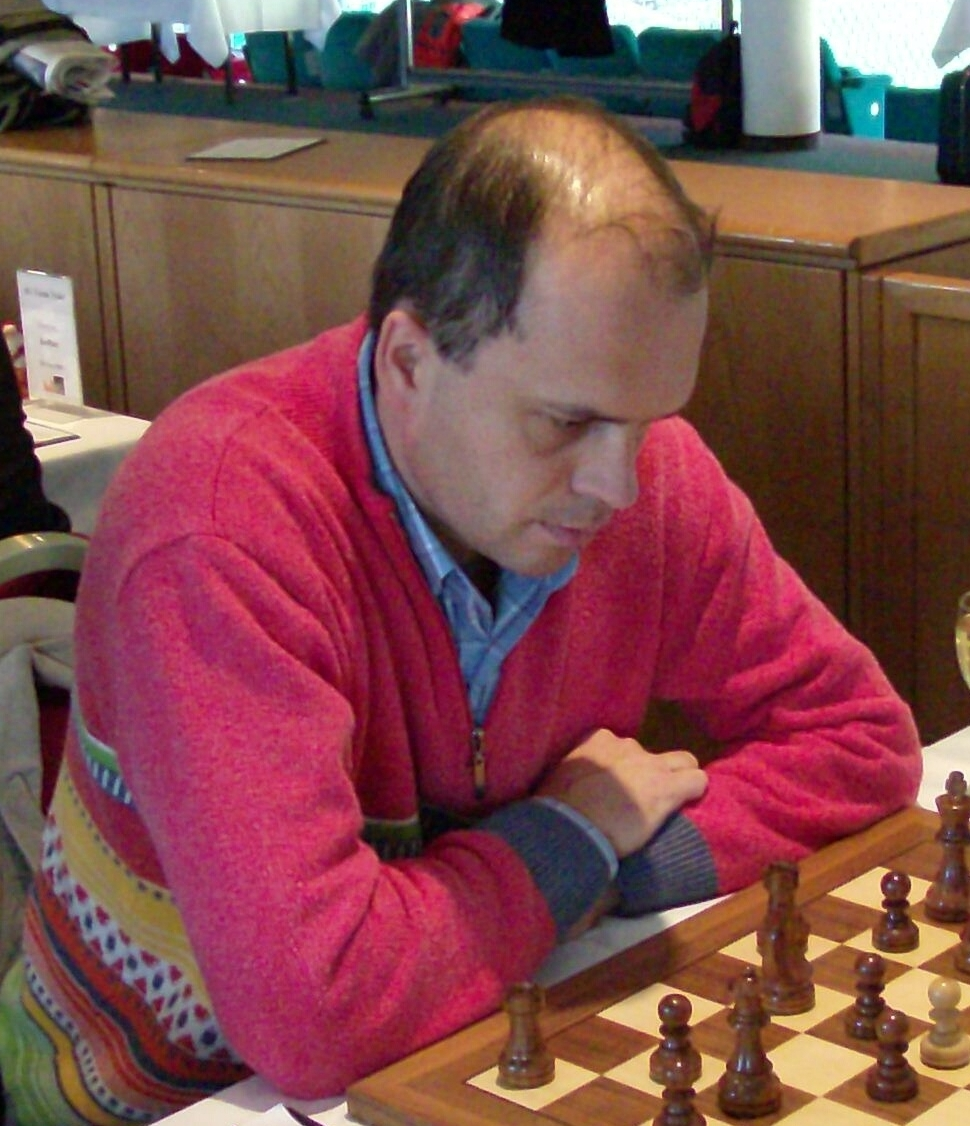

Personal information
- Born: 9 September 1970 (age 55) Uherské Hradiště, Czechoslovakia

Chess career
- Country: Czech Republic
- Title: Grandmaster (1993)
- FIDE rating: 2525 (August 2026)
- Peak rating: 2646 (October 2014)
- Peak ranking: No. 20 (January 1996)

Zbyněk Hráček (born 9 September 1970) is a Czech chess grandmaster. He was Czech Chess Champion in 1994, won the Zonal tournament Odorhea 1995 and the tournaments Pardubice (Open) 1993, Altensteig 1995 and Lippstadt 2000.

== Career ==
Hráček played for Czechoslovakia at the Chess Olympiads of 1990 and 1992, and for the Czech Republic at the Olympiads of 1994, 1996, 2000, 2002, 2004, 2006, 2008, 2010, 2012, and 2014 and in the European Team Chess Championships of 1997, 1999, 2003, 2005 and 2007.

In 1996 (January - June list), Hracek was in the Elo Top Twenty of the world and the leading Czech player. In the November 2009 FIDE list, he has an Elo rating of 2624, making him the Czech Republic's number three.
