= Briše, Zagorje ob Savi =

Briše
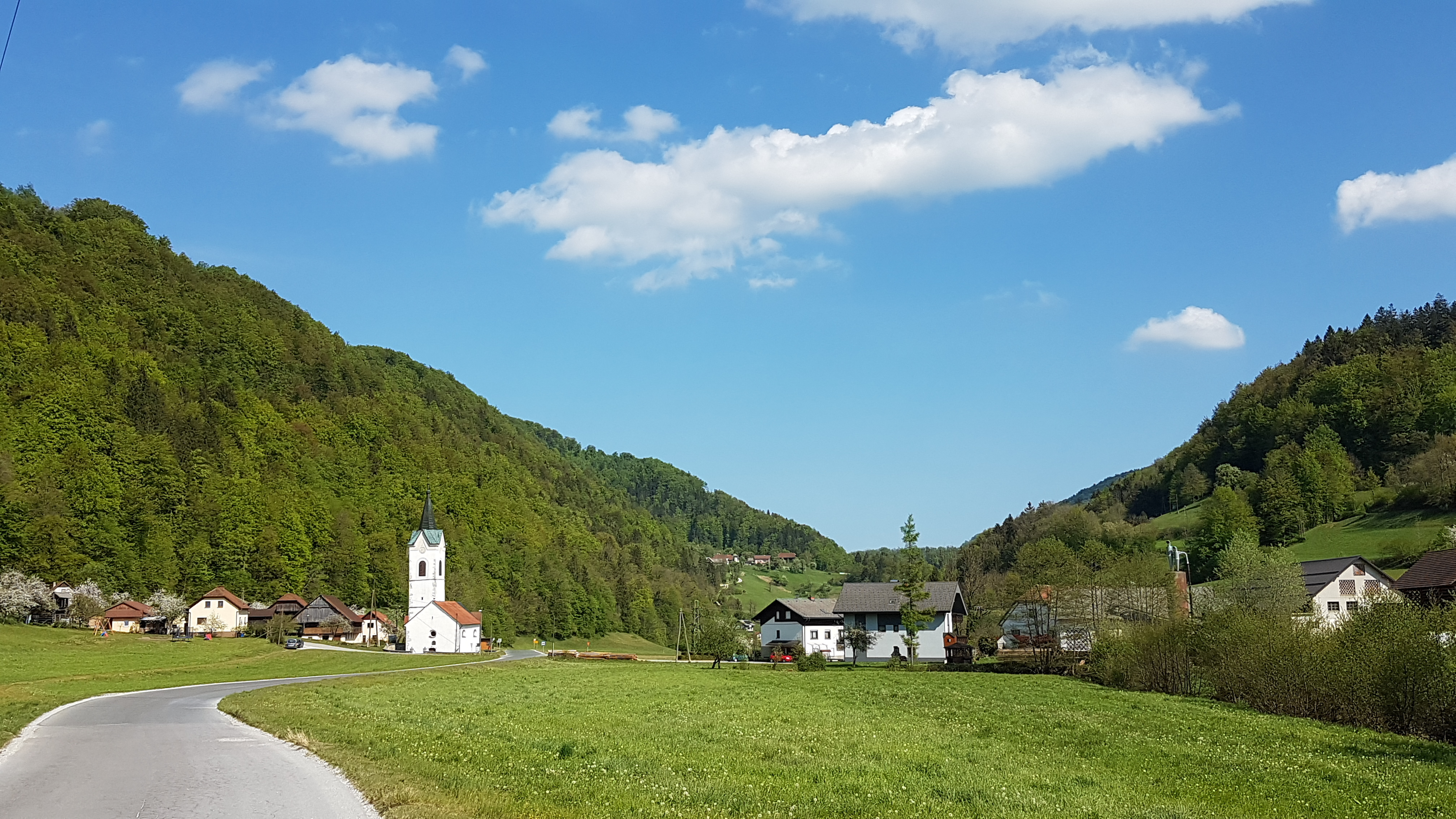

- Location in Slovenia
- Coordinates: 46°9′9.17″N 14°53′38.29″E
- Country: Slovenia
- Traditional region: Upper Carniola
- Statistical region: Central Sava
- Municipality: Zagorje ob Savi

Area
  - Total: 3.44 km^{2} (1.33 sq mi)
- Elevation: 351.4 m (1,153 ft)

Population (2002)
  - Total: 126
- Postal code: 1411

Briše (pronounced [ˈbɾiːʃɛ]; German: Wrische) is a settlement west of Izlake in the Municipality of Zagorje ob Savi in central Slovenia. The area is part of the traditional region of Upper Carniola. It is now included with the rest of the municipality in the Central Sava Statistical Region.

== Church ==
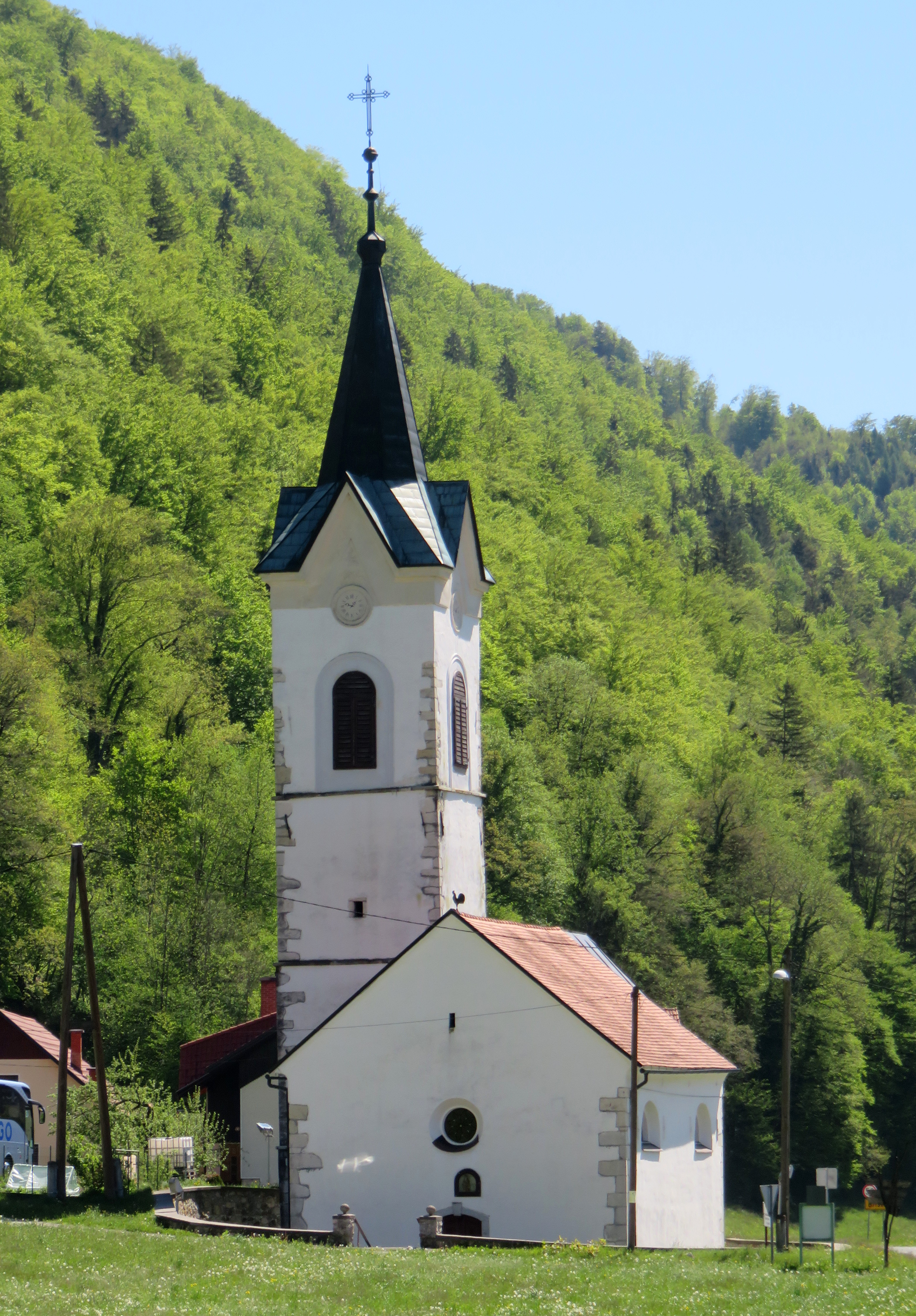
Holy Name of Mary Church

The local church is dedicated to the Holy Name of Mary (Slovene: Sveto Ime Marijino) and belongs to the Parish of Kolovrat. It dates to the 16th century.
