= Luka Lenič =

Slovenian chess grandmaster (born 1988)

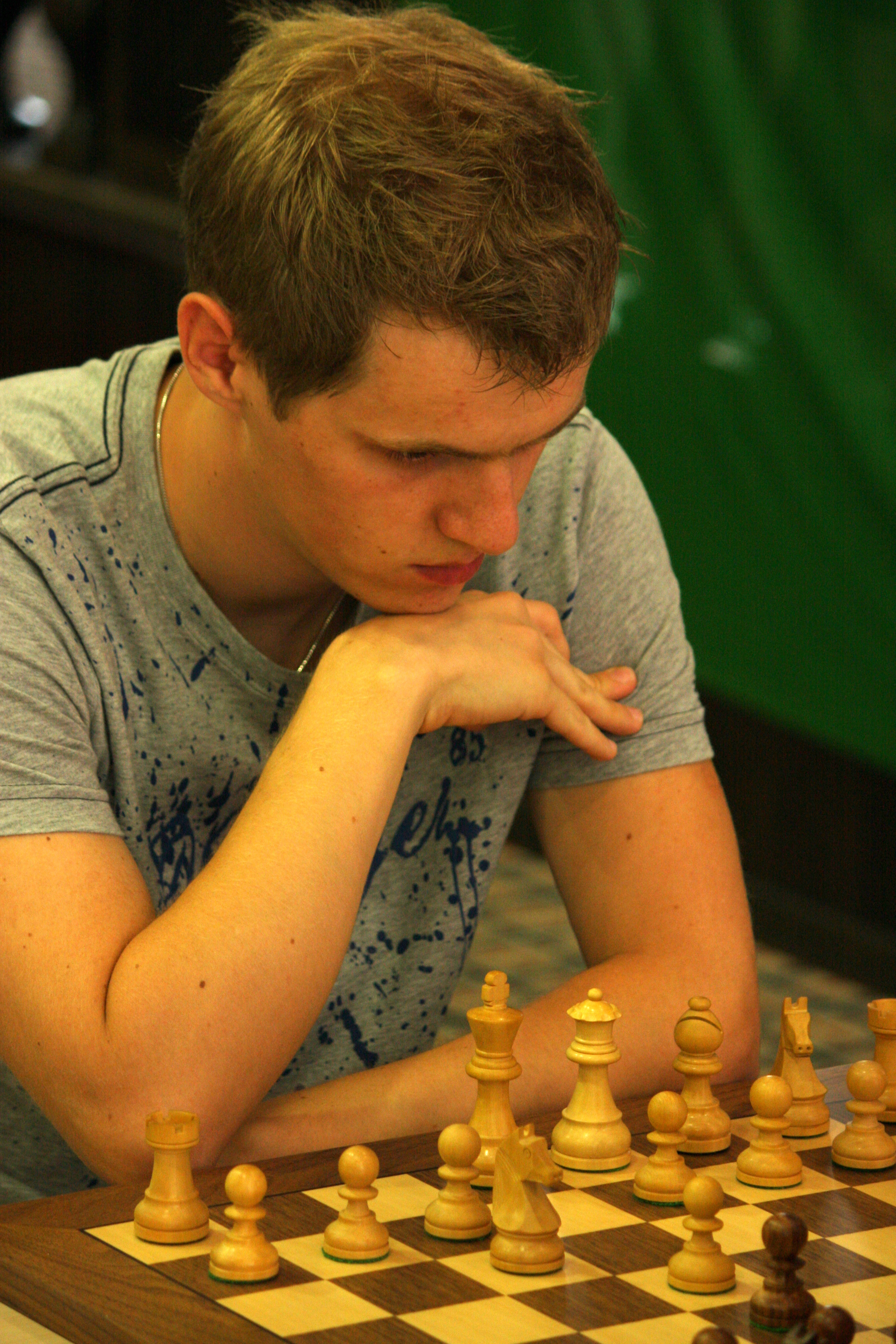
- Lenič in 2009

Personal information
- Born: 13 May 1988 (age 38) Ljubljana, Slovenia

Chess career
- Country: Slovenia
- Title: Grandmaster (2007)
- FIDE rating: 2626 (July 2026)
- Peak rating: 2662 (January 2018)
- Peak ranking: No. 83 (January 2018)

Luka Lenič (born 13 May 1988) is a Slovenian chess player who holds the FIDE title of Grandmaster. He is the top ranked chess player of his country. Lenič won the under-14 division of the World Youth Chess Championships in Heraklion in 2002. He won the Slovenian Chess Championship in 2008, 2009, 2010 and 2013. Lenič has played for the Slovenian national team in the Chess Olympiad, European Team Chess Championship, Mitropa Cup and European Youth Team Championship. He competed in the FIDE World Cup in 2017.

Lenič, alongside fellow Slovenian grandmaster Duško Pavasović, also co-founded the company Kings of Games and created the mobile chess game Chess Universe.
