= Roman Slobodjan =

German chess grandmaster (born 1975)

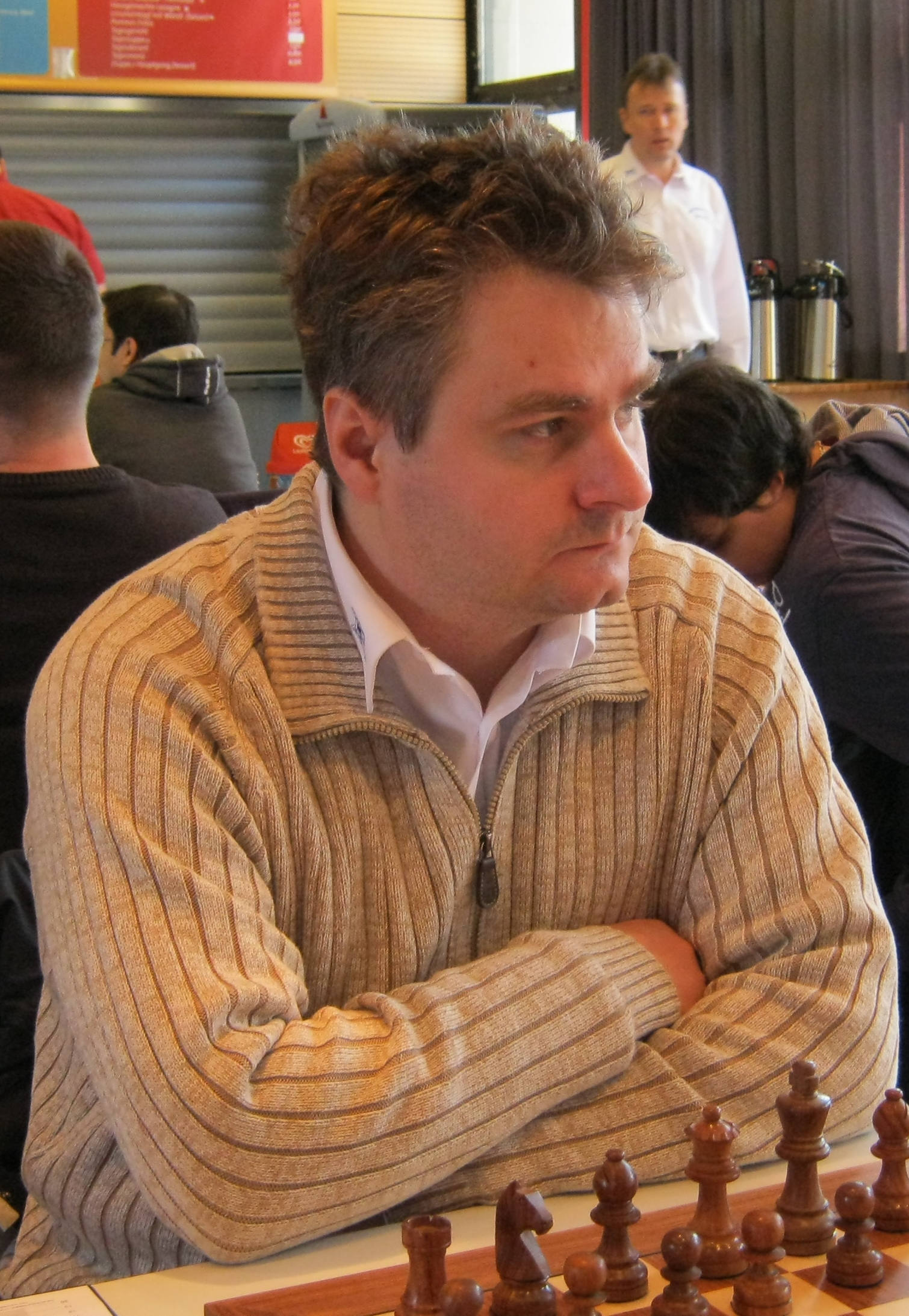

Personal information
- Born: January 1, 1975 (age 51) Potsdam, Germany

Chess career
- Country: Germany
- Title: Grandmaster (1996)
- FIDE rating: 2433 (July 2026)
- Peak rating: 2575 (July 1998)

Roman Slobodjan (born January 1, 1975) is a German chess grandmaster since 1996, and an International master since 1993. Slobodjan won the 1995 World Junior Chess Championship (under 20).

He was twice the Under-20 German Champion- in 1992 in Augsburg, and in 1994 in Herborn.

In the August 2023 FIDE list, he has an Elo rating of 2445. His highest rating was 2575 (in July 1998).
