= Laura Unuk =

Slovenian chess player (born 1999)

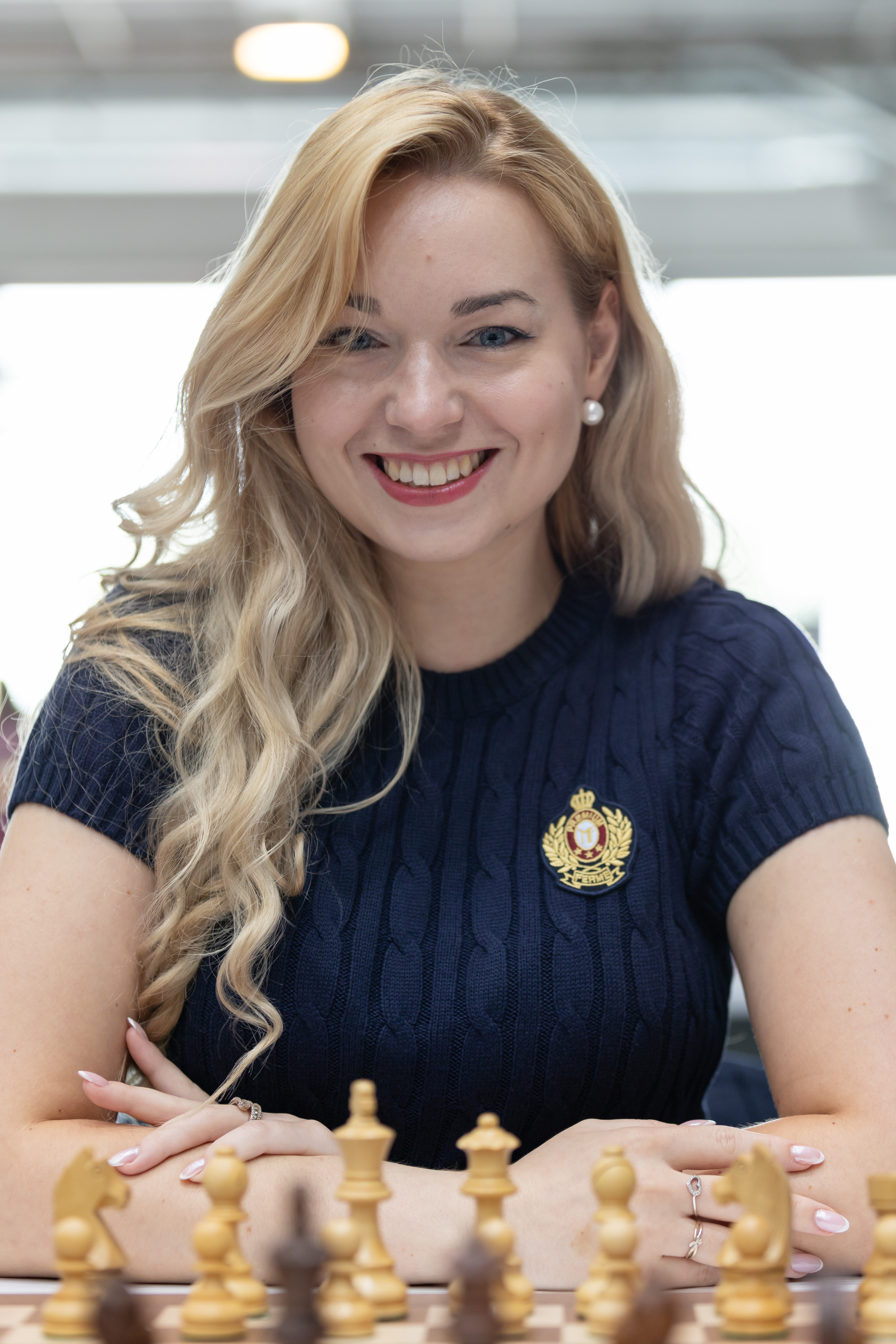
- Unuk in 2024

Personal information
- Born: 9 November 1999 (age 26) Ljubljana, Slovenia

Chess career
- Country: Slovenia
- Title: International Master (2021); Woman Grandmaster (2019)
- Peak rating: 2407 (July 2021)

Laura Unuk (born 9 November 1999) is a Slovenian chess player who holds the title of Woman Grandmaster and International Master. She has been twice world girls' champion in her age category, and was the Slovenian women's champion in 2013. Unuk is the top female player of Slovenia.

== Chess career ==
Unuk has won the Slovenian girls' chess championships multiple times in various age categories: U10 (2009), U12 (2011), U14 (2013), U16 (2014), U16 (2015), U18 (2016), U18 (2017). She played for Slovenia at the World Youth U16 Chess Olympiads in 2013 and 2014. In the European Girls' U18 Team Chess Championships, she has played for Slovenia six times (2012–2017), winning a team gold medal and an individual gold medal in 2014, and an individual silver medal in 2013. In 2014, she won the Girls U16 division of the World Youth Chess Championships in Durban, South Africa. For this victory she was awarded the Woman International Master (WIM) title by FIDE. In the 2017 edition, held in Montevideo, Uruguay, she won the Girls U18 section with a score of 9½/11 (+9–1=1), 1½ points ahead of her nearest competitor.

In August 2013 in Ljubljana, Unuk won the Slovenian Women's Chess Championship.

Unuk played for Slovenia in the Women's Chess Olympiad:

- In 2014, on board four at the 41st Chess Olympiad in Tromsø (+6, =3, -1),
- In 2016, on board one at the 42nd Chess Olympiad in Baku (+5, =4, -1),
- In 2018, on board one at the 43rd Chess Olympiad in Batumi (+2, =4, -4).

Unuk played for Slovenia in the Women's European Team Chess Championship:

- In 2013, at fourth board in Warsaw (+4, =3, -1),
- In 2015, at first board in Reykjavík (+4, =2, -3),
- In 2017, at first board in Crete (+4, =1, -4),
- In 2019, at first board in Batumi (+3, =4, -2).

She earned the title of International Master in 2021.

Together with her Slovenian national chess team fellows Teja Vidic and Lara Janželj, she is hosting the channel Checkitas on Twitch.

== Personal life ==
Unuk was a student from 2014 to 2018 at the sports department of the Bežigrad Grammar School in Ljubljana. As of October 2018, she has been studying Biochemistry in the University of Ljubljana.
