= Ivan Sokolov (chess player) =

Bosnian-Dutch chess grandmaster and writer (born 1968)

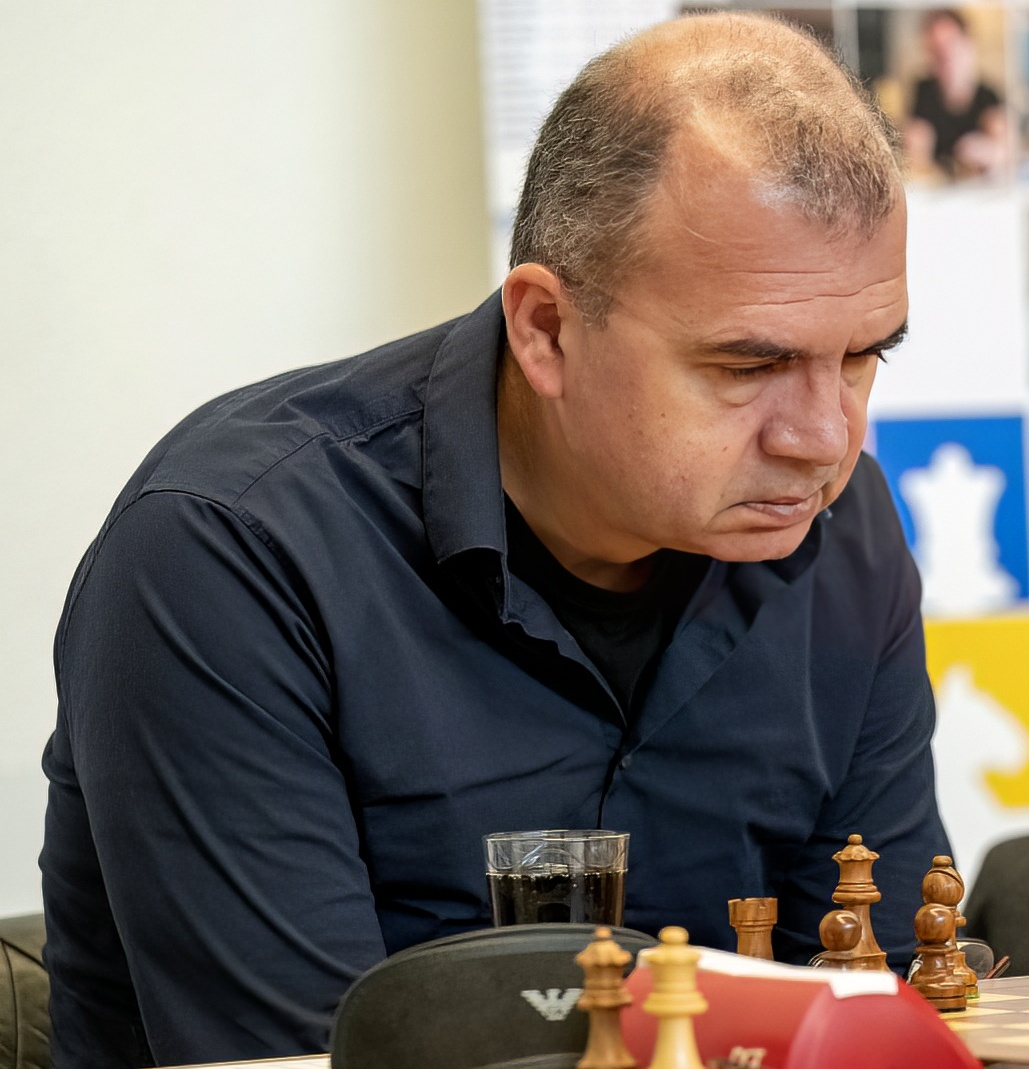
- Sokolov in 2023

Personal information
- Born: June 13, 1968 (age 58) Jajce, SR Bosnia and Herzegovina, Yugoslavia

Chess career
- Country: Yugoslavia (until 1992); Bosnia and Herzegovina (1992–2002; 2009–2010); Netherlands (2002–2009; since 2010)
- Title: Grandmaster (1987)
- FIDE rating: 2559 (October 2026)
- Peak rating: 2706 (January 2004)
- Peak ranking: No. 13 (July 1996)

Ivan Sokolov (Cyrillic: Иван Соколов; born 13 June 1968) is a Bosnian-Dutch chess player and writer. He was awarded the title of Grandmaster (GM) by FIDE in 1987. Sokolov won the 1988 Yugoslav Championship and in 1995 and 1998 the Dutch Championship.

Before earning the GM title, he became a FIDE Master in 1985 and an International Master in 1986. In 1987 and 1993, he won the Vidmar Memorial.

In 2000, he won the 1st European Rapid Chess Championship in Neum edging out on tiebreak Alexey Dreev and Zurab Azmaiparashvili.

Following his playing career, Sokolov has become a successful chess trainer. From 2013 - 2016, he worked as a coach and second for Salem Saleh and served as the trainer of the United Arab Emirates national team. In 2016, he left his job in the UAE to coach Iran's national team, a position that included extensive work with Alireza Firouzja. Sokolov became the coach of the Uzbek national team in May 2022, leading them to victory in the Chennai Olympiad later that year.

== Bibliography ==
- Sokolov, Ivan (1995). Nimzo-Indian Defence: Classical Variation. Cadogan Books. ISBN 978-18-5744-120-8.
- Sokolov, Ivan (1997). Sokolov's Best Games. Everyman Publishers. ISBN 978-18-5744-128-4.
- Sokolov, Ivan (2008). Winning Chess Middlegames: An Essential Guide to Pawn Structures. New In Chess. ISBN 978-90-5691-264-2.
- Sokolov, Ivan (2009). The Ruy Lopez Revisited: Offbeat Weapons & Unexplored Resources. New In Chess. ISBN 978-90-5691-297-0.
- Sokolov, Ivan (2012). The Strategic Nimzo-Indian: A Complete Guide to the Rubinstein Variation. New In Chess. ISBN 978-90-5691-378-6.
- Sokolov, Ivan (2013). Die hohe Schule des Mittelspiels im Schach: Gewinnen in d4 - Bauernstrukturen (in German). New In Chess (translated by Hansen, Hans). ISBN 978-90-5691-432-5.
- Sokolov, Ivan (2013). Sacrifice and Initiative in Chess: Seize the Moment to Get the Advantage. New In Chess. ISBN 978-90-5691-431-8.
