= Alexander Beliavsky =

Ukrainian-Slovenian chess grandmaster (born 1953)

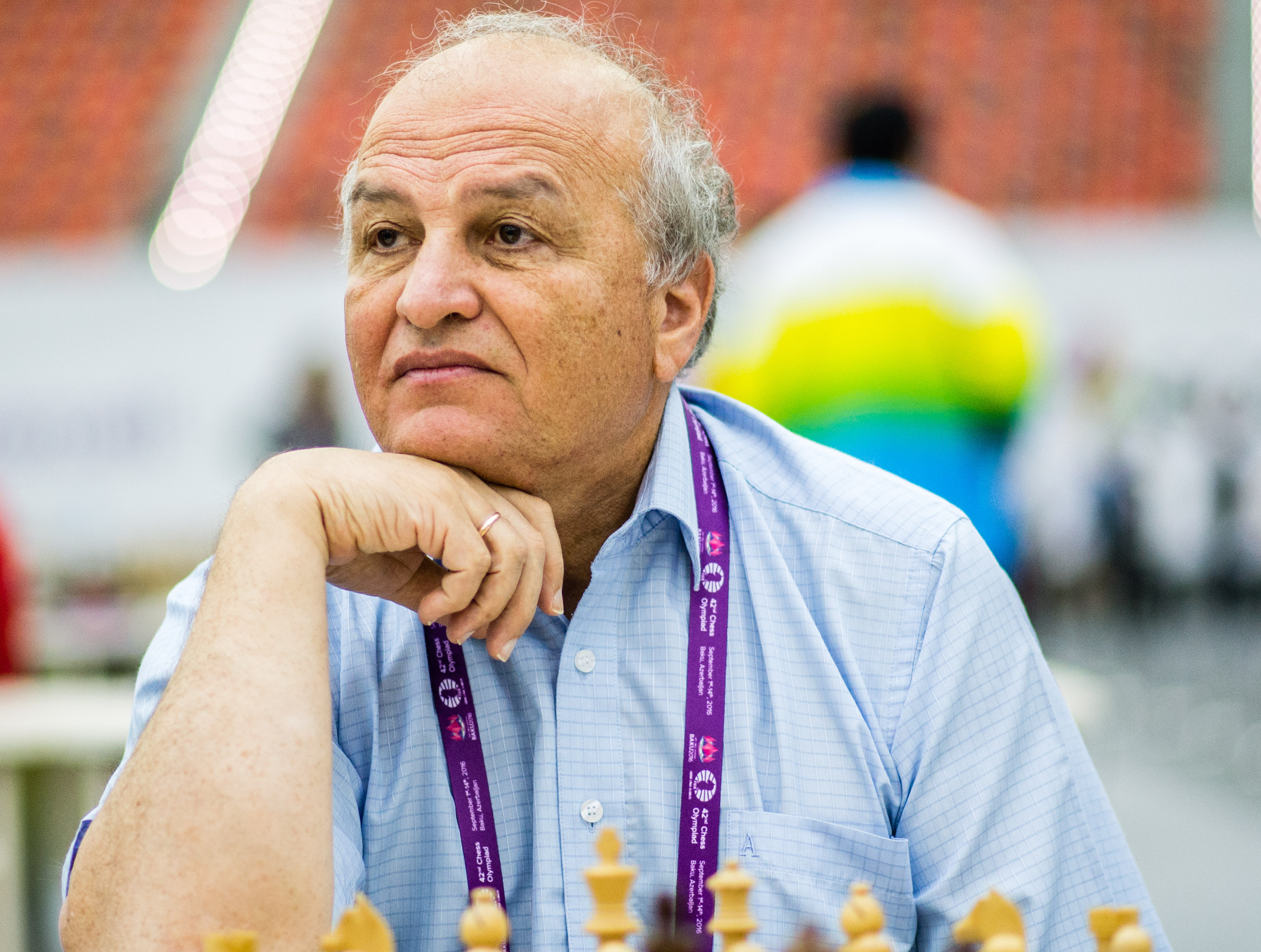
- Beliavsky in 2016

Personal information
- Born: Alexander Genrikhovich Beliavsky; December 17, 1953 (age 72) Lviv, Ukrainian SSR, Soviet Union

Chess career
- Country: Soviet Union (until 1991); Ukraine (1992–1995); Slovenia (since 1996)
- Title: Grandmaster (1975)
- FIDE rating: 2432 (November 2026)
- Peak rating: 2710 (July 1997)
- Peak ranking: No. 4 (July 1985)

Alexander Genrikhovich Beliavsky (Ukrainian: Олександр Генріхович Бєлявський, Slovene: Aleksander Henrikovič Beljavski; also romanized Belyavsky; born December 17, 1953) is a Soviet, Ukrainian and Slovenian chess player. He was awarded the title of Grandmaster by FIDE in 1975. He is also a chess coach and in 2004 was awarded the title of FIDE Senior Trainer.

Beliavsky was born in Lviv, USSR, now Ukraine. He now lives in Slovenia and has been playing for its national team since 1996.

== Career ==
Beliavsky won the World Junior Chess Championship in 1973 and the USSR Chess Championship four times (in 1974, 1980, 1987 and 1990).

In the 1982–84 World Chess Championship cycle, he qualified for the Candidates Tournament, losing to eventual winner Garry Kasparov in the quarterfinals of the 1983 Candidates matches. Beliavsky played on the top board for the USSR team that won the gold medal in the 1984 Chess Olympiad. Beliavsky was a mainstay at international tournaments throughout the eighties and early nineties, however, he did not perform to the highest levels. In the 1985-87 Candidates he finished 7/16, and neither did he qualify for the 1988-90 Candidates tournament nor the 1994-95 PCA Candidates tournament.

In tournaments, he was first equal at Baden bei Wien 1980, first at Tilburg 1981, second equal at Tilburg 1984, joint winner at Wijk aan Zee 1984 and joint second at the same event a year later. At the second Russia (USSR) vs Rest of the World match in 1984, he was the top scorer for the victorious Soviet team, defeating Yasser Seirawan 2–0 and Bent Larsen 1½–½. Beliavsky won the Vidmar Memorial tournament four times: in 1999, 2001, 2003 (with Emil Sutovsky) and 2005. He finished third in the Linares tournament of 1991, behind Vasyl Ivanchuk and Garry Kasparov.

From September 2009 to May 2010, he was the oldest person among the world's top 100 active players, and he made a brief reappearance in June 2013 at age 59. He competed at the 2009 Maccabiah Games. In 2013 he tied for 1st–8th places with Alexander Moiseenko, Evgeny Romanov, Hrant Melkumyan, Constantin Lupulescu, Francisco Vallejo Pons, Sergei Movsesian, Ian Nepomniachtchi, Alexey Dreev and Evgeny Alekseev in the European Individual Chess Championship, thus qualifying for the FIDE World Cup.

Beliavsky shares the record for having defeated the most undisputed world champions. He has defeated nine – every undisputed world champion from Vassily Smyslov to Magnus Carlsen except Bobby Fischer – a record he shares with Paul Keres and Victor Korchnoi.

== Books ==
- Beliavsky, Alexander; Mikhalchishin, Adrian (1995), Winning Endgame Technique, Batsford, ISBN 0-7134-7512-9
- Beliavsky, Alexander; Mikhalchishin, Adrian (1998). Fianchetto Grunfeld. Everyman Chess. ISBN 978-1-85744-204-5.
- Beliavsky, Alexander (1998), Uncompromising Chess, Cadogan, ISBN 1-85744-205-9
- Beliavsky, Alexander; Mikhalchishin, Adrian (1999), The Two Knights Defence, Batsford, ISBN 0-7134-8441-1
- Beliavsky, Alexander; Mikhalchishin, Adrian (2000), Winning Endgame Strategy, Batsford, ISBN 0-7134-8446-2
- Beliavsky, Alexander; Mikhalchishin, Adrian (2003), Modern Endgame Practice, Batsford, ISBN 0-7134-8740-2

== See also ==
- List of Jewish chess players
