= FIDE World Chess Championship 2000 =

Chess tournament in New Delhi, India and Tehran, Iran

World Chess Championship 2000
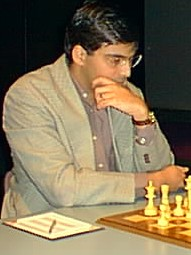
- Viswanathan Anand

Tournament information
- Sport: Chess
- Location: (Iran) Tehran, (India) New Delhi
- Dates: 27 November 2000–26 December 2000
- Administrator: FIDE
- Tournament format: Single-elimination tournament
- Host(s): Chess Federation of Iran, All India Chess Federation
- Participants: 100
- Purse: $3 million

Final positions
- Champion: (India) Viswanathan Anand
- Runner-up: (Spain) Alexei Shirov

Tournament statistics
- Matches played: 99

The FIDE World Chess Championship 2000 was held in New Delhi, India, and Tehran, Iran. The first six rounds were played in New Delhi between 27 November and 15 December 2000, and the final match in Tehran started on 20 December and ended on 24 December 2000. The top seeded Indian Grandmaster Viswanathan Anand won the championship.

== Background ==
At the time of this championship, the World title was split. The newly crowned Classical World Champion, Vladimir Kramnik, did not participate, as well as the previous Classical Champion and world's highest-rated player, Garry Kasparov. Anatoly Karpov, the 1998 FIDE World Champion and No.11-rated player, also did not take part in the tournament as he was in the midst of filing a lawsuit against the organization. However, most other strongest players of the world took part, including the defending FIDE World Champion Alexander Khalifman and the 2000 World Cup winner Viswanathan Anand. The only other absentee from the top 25 was Ye Jiangchuan.

== Participants ==
All players are Grandmasters unless indicated otherwise.

1. Viswanathan Anand (IND), 2762
2. Alexander Morozevich (RUS), 2756
3. Michael Adams (ENG), 2755
4. Alexei Shirov (ESP), 2746
5. Peter Leko (HUN), 2743
6. Vassily Ivanchuk (UKR), 2719
7. Veselin Topalov (BUL), 2707
8. Evgeny Bareev (RUS), 2702
9. Michael Krasenkov (POL), 2702
10. Rustam Kasimdzhanov (UZB), 2690
11. Peter Svidler (RUS), 2689
12. Boris Gelfand (ISR), 2681
13. Nigel Short (ENG), 2677
14. Ilya Smirin (ISR), 2677
15. Alexey Dreev (RUS), 2676
16. Zurab Azmaiparashvili (GEO), 2673
17. Sergei Rublevsky (RUS), 2670
18. Zoltán Almási (HUN), 2668
19. Xu Jun (CHN), 2668
20. Mikhail Gurevich (BEL), 2667
21. Alexander Khalifman (RUS), 2667
22. Sergei Movsesian (CZE), 2666
23. Kiril Georgiev (BUL), 2661
24. Vladimir Akopian (ARM), 2660
25. Alexander Beliavsky (SLO), 2659
26. Vladislav Tkachiev (FRA), 2657
27. Peng Xiaomin (CHN), 2657
28. Jeroen Piket (NED), 2649
29. Joël Lautier (FRA), 2648
30. Alexei Fedorov (BLR), 2646
31. Loek van Wely (NED), 2643
32. Boris Gulko (USA), 2643
33. Viktor Bologan (MDA), 2641
34. Gilberto Milos (BRA), 2633
35. Ruslan Ponomariov (UKR), 2630
36. Alexander Onischuk (UKR), 2627
37. Konstantin Sakaev (RUS), 2627
38. Jaan Ehlvest (EST), 2627
39. Andrei Kharlov (RUS), 2627
40. Rafael Vaganian (ARM), 2623
41. Jonathan Speelman (ENG), 2623
42. Pavel Tregubov (RUS), 2620
43. Étienne Bacrot (FRA), 2613
44. Lev Psakhis (ISR), 2611
45. Emil Sutovsky (ISR), 2609
46. Alexander Grischuk (RUS), 2606
47. Vladimir Malakhov (RUS), 2605
48. Vladimir Baklan (UKR), 2599
49. Smbat Lputian (ARM), 2598
50. Evgeny Vladimirov (KAZ), 2598
51. Alex Yermolinsky (USA), 2596
52. Artashes Minasian (ARM), 2595
53. Christopher Lutz (GER), 2595
54. Viorel Iordăchescu (MDA), 2594
55. Liviu-Dieter Nisipeanu (ROM), 2592
56. Alexej Alexandrov (BLR), 2591
57. Aleksandr Galkin (RUS), 2587
58. Alexandre Lesiège (CAN), 2584
59. Utut Adianto (INA), 2583
60. Vladislav Nevednichy (ROM), 2582
61. Joel Benjamin (USA), 2577
62. Grigory Serper (USA), 2574
63. Krishnan Sasikiran (IND), 2573
64. Alexander Chernin (HUN), 2572
65. Gilberto Hernandez (MEX), 2572
66. Rafael Leitão (BRA), 2567
67. Alexander Ivanov (USA), 2567
68. Karen Asrian (ARM), 2566
69. Alexei Bezgodov (RUS), 2557
70. Hannes Stefánsson (ISL), 2557
71. Abhijit Kunte (IND), 2556
72. Đào Thiên Hải (VIE), 2555
73. Evgenij Agrest (SWE), 2554
74. Sergey Volkov (RUS), 2554
75. Jesús Nogueiras (CUB), 2552
76. Sune Berg Hansen (DEN), 2545
77. Hichem Hamdouchi (MAR), 2541
78. Bartłomiej Macieja (POL), 2536
79. Alexander Rustemov (RUS), 2534
80. Mikhail Rytshagov (EST), 2529
81. Emir Dizdarevic (BIH), 2527
82. Igor Nataf (FRA), 2526
83. Darcy Lima (BRA), 2525
84. Aloyzas Kveinys (LTU), 2522
85. Ivan Zaja (CRO), 2513, IM
86. Paweł Blehm (POL), 2510, IM
87. Dibyendu Barua (IND), 2502
88. Mohammed Al-Modiahki (QAT), 2499
89. Buenaventura Villamayor (PHI), 2495
90. Ehsan Ghaem Maghami (IRI), 2488, no title
91. Michele Godena (ITA), 2485
92. Fouad El Taher (EGY), 2485, IM
93. Aleksandar Wohl (AUS), 2461, IM
94. Rodrigo Vasquez (CHI), 2454, IM
95. Imad Hakki (SYR), 2429, IM
96. Ibrahim Hasan Labib (EGY), 2426, IM
97. Fabian Fiorito (ARG), 2418, IM
98. Amir Bagheri (IRI), 2409, IM
99. Amon Simutowe (ZAM), 2322, IM
100. Alexander Utnasunov (RUS), 2257, no title

== Qualification ==
Players qualified for the championship according to the following criteria:

1. four semi-finalists of the previous championship (Alexander Khalifman, Vladimir Akopian, Michael Adams, Liviu-Dieter Nisipeanu);
2. juniors rated 2600 or higher in the rating lists of January 2000 to July 2000;
3. the World Junior Champions 1999 (Aleksandr Galkin) and 2000 (Lázaro Bruzón);
4. the Women's World Champion 1999 (Xie Jun);
5. three nominees of the FIDE President;
6. one nominee of the organizers;
7. 62 qualifiers from the zonal tournaments;
8. one nominee from each of the Continental Presidents (for a total of four players);
9. a sufficient number of best rated players, to bring the total number of participants to 100 (the average of January and July 2000 rating lists was used);

== Playing conditions ==
The championship was a knockout tournament similar to other FIDE World Chess Championships between 1998 and 2004: the players were paired for short matches, with losers eliminated. 28 players (27 best rated and Liviu-Dieter Nisipeanu, one of the quarterfinalists of the previous championship) were given byes to the second round. The field of 100 participants was reduced to one winner over seven rounds.

Rounds 1–5 consisted of a two-game match, followed by tie breaks at faster time controls if required. The time control for regular games was 100 minutes, with 50 minutes added after move 40, 10 minutes added after move 60, and 30 seconds added after each move starting with move 1. Tie breaks consisted of two rapid chess games (25 minutes each + 10 seconds per move); followed by two games with shorter time controls if required (15 minutes + 10 seconds per move); followed by a series of blitz games (4 minutes + 10 seconds per move for White, 5 minutes + 10 seconds per move for Black, first player to win is the winner of the match). The semifinals (round 6) were best of four games, and the final was best of six games, with the same conditions for the tie-breaks.

== Schedule ==
There was one rest day during round 4 and two rest days during round 6. The tie-breaks of rounds 1–5 were played in the evening following the second game. The final took place one month after rounds 1–6.

- Round 1: 27 November 2000, 28 November 2000 (tiebreaks on 29 November 2000)
- Round 2: 30 November 2000, 1 December 2000 (tiebreaks on 2 December 2000)
- Round 3: 3 December 2000, 4 December 2000 (tiebreaks on 5 December 2000)
- Round 4: 6 December 2000, 7 December 2000 (tiebreaks on 8 December 2000)
- Round 5: 9 December 2000, 10 December 2000 (tiebreaks on 11 December 2000)
- Round 6: 12 December 2000 – 15 December 2000 (tiebreaks on 16 December 2000)
- Round 7: 20 December 2000 – 26 December 2000, with a rest day on 23 December 2000 (tiebreaks on 27 December 2000)

== Results, rounds 1–4 ==
=== Section 1 ===
First round
33	(Moldova) Viktor Bologan	1½
70	(Iceland) Hannes Stefánsson	½
49	(Armenia) Smbat Lputian	1½
86	(Poland) Paweł Blehm	½
41	(England) Jon Speelman	1½
78	(Poland) Bartłomiej Macieja	2½
57	(Russia) Aleksandr Galkin	2
93	(Australia) Aleksandar Wohl	0

Second round
1	(India) Viswanathan Anand	1½
33	(Moldova) Viktor Bologan	½
17	(Russia) Sergei Rublevsky	½
49	(Armenia) Smbat Lputian	1½
9	(Poland) Michael Krasenkov	4½
78	(Poland) Bartłomiej Macieja	5½
25	(Slovenia) Alexander Beliavsky	1½
57	(Russia) Aleksandr Galkin	½

Third round
1	(India) Viswanathan Anand	1½
49	(Armenia) Smbat Lputian	½
78	(Poland) Bartłomiej Macieja	3
25	(Slovenia) Alexander Beliavsky	1

Fourth round
1	(India) Viswanathan Anand	1½
78	(Poland) Bartłomiej Macieja	½

=== Section 2 ===
First round
37	(Russia) Konstantin Sakaev	2½
74	(Russia) Sergey Volkov	3½
53	(Germany) Christopher Lutz	2½
90	(Iran) Ehsan Ghaem Maghami	1½
45	(Israel) Emil Sutovsky	½
82	(France) Igor Nataf	1½
29	(France) Joël Lautier	½
66	(Brazil) Rafael Leitão	1½
61	(United States) Joel Benjamin	2
97	(Argentina) Fabian Fiorito	0

Second round
5	(Hungary) Peter Leko	1½
74	(Russia) Sergey Volkov	½
21	(Russia) Alexander Khalifman	2½
53	(Germany) Christopher Lutz	1½
13	(England) Nigel Short	2½
82	(France) Igor Nataf	3½
66	(Brazil) Rafael Leitão	1½
61	(United States) Joel Benjamin	½

Third round
5	(Hungary) Peter Leko	3½
21	(Russia) Alexander Khalifman	4½
82	(France) Igor Nataf	½
66	(Brazil) Rafael Leitão	1½

Fourth round
21	(Russia) Alexander Khalifman	1½
66	(Brazil) Rafael Leitão	½

=== Section 3 ===
First round
35	(Ukraine) Ruslan Ponomariov	½
72	(Vietnam) Đào Thiên Hải	1½
51	(United States) Alex Yermolinsky	1½
88	(Qatar) Mohammed Al-Modiahki	½
43	(France) Étienne Bacrot	3
80	(Estonia) Mikhail Rytshagov	1
59	(Indonesia) Utut Adianto	1½
95	(Syria) Imad Hakki	½

Second round
3	(England) Michael Adams	3
72	(Vietnam) Đào Thiên Hải	1
19	(China) Xu Jun	½
51	(United States) Alex Yermolinsky	1½
11	(Russia) Peter Svidler	3
43	(France) Étienne Bacrot	1
27	(China) Peng Xiaomin	2½
59	(Indonesia) Utut Adianto	1½

Third round
3	(England) Michael Adams	3
51	(United States) Alex Yermolinsky	1
11	(Russia) Peter Svidler	2½
27	(China) Peng Xiaomin	1½

Fourth round
3	(England) Michael Adams	2½
11	(Russia) Peter Svidler	1½

=== Section 4 ===
First round
39	(Russia) Andrei Kharlov	1½
76	(Denmark) Sune Berg Hansen	½
47	(Russia) Vladimir Malakhov	2
84	(Lithuania) Aloyzas Kveinys	0
31	(Netherlands) Loek van Wely	1½
68	(Armenia) Karen Asrian	½
63	(India) Krishnan Sasikiran	1½
99	(Zambia) Amon Simutowe	½

Second round
7	(Bulgaria) Veselin Topalov	1½
39	(Russia) Andrei Kharlov	½
23	(Bulgaria) Kiril Georgiev	3½
55	(Romania) Liviu-Dieter Nisipeanu	2½
15	(Russia) Alexey Dreev	4
47	(Russia) Vladimir Malakhov	2
31	(Netherlands) Loek van Wely	2
63	(India) Krishnan Sasikiran	0

Third round
7	(Bulgaria) Veselin Topalov	1½
23	(Bulgaria) Kiril Georgiev	½
15	(Russia) Alexey Dreev	1½
31	(Netherlands) Loek van Wely	½

Fourth round
7	(Bulgaria) Veselin Topalov	4
15	(Russia) Alexey Dreev	2

=== Section 5 ===
First round
34	(Brazil) Gilberto Milos	2½
71	(India) Abhijit Kunte	1½
50	(Kazakhstan) Evgeny Vladimirov	2
87	(India) Dibyendu Barua	0
42	(Russia) Pavel Tregubov	3½
79	(Russia) Alexander Rustemov	2½
58	(Canada) Alexandre Lesiège	2
94	(Chile) Rodrigo Vasquez	0

Second round
2	(Russia) Alexander Morozevich	2
34	(Brazil) Gilberto Milos	0
18	(Hungary) Zoltán Almási	1½
50	(Kazakhstan) Evgeny Vladimirov	2½
10	(Uzbekistan) Rustam Kasimdzhanov	2½
42	(Russia) Pavel Tregubov	1½
26	(France) Vladislav Tkachiev	1½
58	(Canada) Alexandre Lesiège	½

Third round
2	(Russia) Alexander Morozevich	1½
50	(Kazakhstan) Evgeny Vladimirov	½
10	(Uzbekistan) Rustam Kasimdzhanov	1½
26	(France) Vladislav Tkachiev	2½

Fourth round
2	(Russia) Alexander Morozevich	½
26	(France) Vladislav Tkachiev	1½

=== Section 6 ===
First round
38	(Estonia) Jaan Ehlvest	4
75	(Cuba) Jesús Nogueiras	2
54	(Moldova) Viorel Iordăchescu	2½
91	(Italy) Michele Godena	1½
46	(Russia) Alexander Grischuk	2½
83	(Brazil) Darcy Lima	1½
30	(Belarus) Alexei Fedorov	½
67	(United States) Alexander Ivanov	1½
62	(United States) Grigory Serper	1½
98	(Iran) Amir Bagheri	½

Second round
6	(Ukraine) Vassily Ivanchuk	1½
38	(Estonia) Jaan Ehlvest	2½
22	(Czech Republic) Sergei Movsesian	4
54	(Moldova) Viorel Iordăchescu	2
14	(Israel) Ilya Smirin	1
46	(Russia) Alexander Grischuk	3
67	(United States) Alexander Ivanov	0
62	(United States) Grigory Serper	2

Third round
38	(Estonia) Jaan Ehlvest	4
22	(Czech Republic) Sergei Movsesian	2
46	(Russia) Alexander Grischuk	1½
62	(United States) Grigory Serper	½

Fourth round
38	(Estonia) Jaan Ehlvest	1½
46	(Russia) Alexander Grischuk	2½

=== Section 7 ===
First round
36	(Ukraine) Alexander Onischuk	1½
73	(Sweden) Evgenij Agrest	½
52	(Armenia) Artashes Minasian	4
89	(Philippines) Buenaventura Villamayor	2
44	(Israel) Lev Psakhis	3
81	(Bosnia and Herzegovina) Emir Dizdarevic	4
28	(Netherlands) Jeroen Piket	2½
65	(Mexico) Gilberto Hernandez	1½
60	(Romania) Vladislav Nevednichy	1½
96	(Egypt) Ibrahim Hasan Labib	½

Second round
4	(Spain) Alexei Shirov	2½
36	(Ukraine) Alexander Onischuk	1½
20	(Belgium) Mikhail Gurevich	2½
52	(Armenia) Artashes Minasian	1½
12	(Israel) Boris Gelfand	2
81	(Bosnia and Herzegovina) Emir Dizdarevic	0
28	(Netherlands) Jeroen Piket	2
60	(Romania) Vladislav Nevednichy	0

Third round
4	(Spain) Alexei Shirov	2½
20	(Belgium) Mikhail Gurevich	1½
12	(Israel) Boris Gelfand	1½
28	(Netherlands) Jeroen Piket	½

Fourth round
4	(Spain) Alexei Shirov	2½
12	(Israel) Boris Gelfand	1½

=== Section 8 ===
First round
40	(Armenia) Rafael Vaganian	2
77	(Morocco) Hichem Hamdouchi	0
56	(Belarus) Alexej Alexandrov	4½
92	(Egypt) Fouad El Taher	3½
48	(Ukraine) Vladimir Baklan	3½
85	(Croatia) Ivan Zaja	2½
32	(United States) Boris Gulko	2½
69	(Russia) Alexei Bezgodov	1½
64	(Hungary) Alexander Chernin	1½
100	(Russia) Alexander Utnasunov	½

Second round
8	(Russia) Evgeny Bareev	4
40	(Armenia) Rafael Vaganian	2
24	(Armenia) Vladimir Akopian	½
56	(Belarus) Alexej Alexandrov	1½
16	(Georgia (country)) Zurab Azmaiparashvili	1½
48	(Ukraine) Vladimir Baklan	½
32	(United States) Boris Gulko	3½
64	(Hungary) Alexander Chernin	2½

Third round
8	(Russia) Evgeny Bareev	2
56	(Belarus) Alexej Alexandrov	0
16	(Georgia (country)) Zurab Azmaiparashvili	½
32	(United States) Boris Gulko	1½

Fourth round
8	(Russia) Evgeny Bareev	2½
32	(United States) Boris Gulko	1½

== Results, rounds 5–7 ==
Quarterfinals
1	(India) V Anand	3½
21	(Russia) A Khalifman	2½
3	(England) M Adams	1½
7	(Bulgaria) V Topalov	½
26	(France) V Tkachiev	1½
46	(Russia) A Grischuk	2½
4	(Spain) A Shirov	2½
8	(Russia) E Bareev	1½

Semifinals (best of 4)
1	(India) V Anand	2½
3	(England) M Adams	1½
46	(Russia) A Grischuk	1½
4	(Spain) A Shirov	2½

Final (best of 6)
1	(India) V Anand	3½
4	(Spain) A Shirov	½

== Championship final ==
Anand–Shirov, 2000 World Ch.

Position: g8 black king, b7 black pawn, h7 black pawn, d5 black pawn, e5 white bishop, b4 white pawn, g4 black pawn, h4 white knight, a3 white pawn, d3 white king, e3 black pawn, d2 black pawn, g2 black rook, a1 white rook, c1 black rook, h1 white rook

Final position of the match.

The final match of the FIDE World Championship featured Viswanathan Anand, the pre-tournament favorite and No. 1 seed, and Alexei Shirov, who had previously been denied a chance to challenge Garry Kasparov for the Classical World Championship despite winning a candidates' match two years earlier. After an uneventful 34-move draw in Game 1, the two players exchanged pieces quickly in Game 2, leading to a relatively even rook-and-pawn endgame after 30 moves. But Shirov gave Anand an opening with 47... Ke5?, allowing the latter to preserve two passed pawns and turn them into a winning advantage. Anand would strike again in the third game – with Shirov on the attack, Anand held a strong defensive position until 27... Qg5! followed by 28. Qf3?! from Shirov gave him a solid advantage.

In the decisive Game 4, Shirov played a sharp attacking game, knowing a victory was required to stay in contention for the championship. But he faltered with 19... Qf6?, missing a sound queen sacrifice that would have led to an equal endgame with winning opportunities (19... Qxe2 20. Bxe2 Bf2 21. Rh1 e5) and followed with 20... Qxc3?, leaving his h-file bishop hanging. Anand was able to translate the resulting advantage into a winning position.

FIDE World Chess Championship Final 2000
	Rating	1	2	3	4	Points
Alexei Shirov (Spain)	2746	½	0	0	0	½
Viswanathan Anand (India)	2774	½	1	1	1	3½
