= Kazakhstani Chess Championship =

Chess championship in Kazakhstan

The Kazakhstani Chess Championship is currently organized by the Kazakhstan Chess Federation. Chess was one of the sports contested at the second Kazakhstan Spartakiad held in Alma-Ata in 1933: Gubaydula Mendeshev was the winner. The first official Kazakhstani championships for men, women and juniors were held in Alma-Ata in 1934. Anatoly Ufimtsev holds the record for the most titles won with eleven.

== List of national championship winners ==
Year	Open	Women	Notes
1934	Isidor Lopatnikov		
1935	Sergey Freiman		
1937	Aleksey Shapovalov		
1938	Shamshidov Murzagaliev		
1939	Shamshidov Murzagaliev		Murzagaliev defeated Konstantin Kokhanov in a match after they tied for first in the round robin.
1940	Shamshidov Murzagaliev		
1947	Anatoly Ufimtsev		
1948	Anatoly Ufimtsev		
1949	Anatoly Ufimtsev		
1950	Anatoly Ufimtsev		Vitaly Tarasov and Ratmir Kholmov participated as non-Kazakhstani invitees. Tarasov won the overall tournament; Ufimtsev tied for second with Kholmov and received the national title as a result.
1951	Anatoly Ufimtsev		
1952	Anatoly Ufimtsev		
1953	Anatoly Ufimtsev		
1954	Anatoly Ufimtsev, K. Kurkleitis		Ufimtsev and Kurkleitis were declared co-champions.
1955	Anatoly Ufimtsev		
1956	Yury Nikolaevich Yakovlev		Yakovlev defeated Anatoly Ufimtsev in a match after they tied for first in the round robin.
1957	Anatoly Ufimtsev		Evgeny Vasiukov participated as a non-Kazakhstani invitee and won the overall tournament; Ufimtsev tied for second with V. Marantsman and defeated him in a playoff match.
1958	Boris Katalimov, Isay Goliak		Katalimov and Goliak were declared co-champions.
1959	Vladimir Muratov		
1960	Boris Katalimov		
1961	Boris Katalimov		
1962	Gennady Movshovich		
1963	Valentin Konstantinov		
1964	Alexander Noskov		Noskov won a playoff over Yuri Nikitin and Nikolai Gusev after all three players tied for first in the round robin.
1965	Valentin Konstantinov		
1966	Vladimir Seredenko		Vladimir Antoshin participated as a non-Kazakhstani invitee and won the overall tournament; Seredenko finished second overall and received the national title.
1967	Alexander Noskov		
1968	Yuri Nikitin		
1969	Yuri Nikitin		
1970	Anatoly Ufimtsev		
1971	Vladimir Muratov		
1972	Mikhail Mukhin		
1973	Vladimir Liavdansky		Liavdansky was from Leningrad, not Kazakhstan, but was nonetheless recognized as the winner; Eduard Bukhman, also from Leningrad, placed second; Oleg Dzuban finished third and was the highest-placed Kazakhstani player.
1974	Boris Katalimov		
1975	?		
1976	Boris Katalimov		
1977	Boris Katalimov, Vladimir Seredenko		Katalimov and Seredenko were declared co-champions.
1978	Oleg Dzuban		
1980	Boris Katalimov		
1981	Oleg Dzuban		
1982	Oleg Dzuban, Bolat Asanov		Dzuban and Asanov were declared co-champions.
1983	Oleg Dzuban		
1984	Nukhim Rashkovsky		
1985	Serikbay Temirbayev		
1986	Serikbay Temirbayev		
1987	Yevgeniy Vladimirov		
1988	Yevgeniy Vladimirov		
1989	Vladimir Seredenko		
1990	Oleg Dzuban		
1991	Vladislav Tkachiev		
1992	Vladislav Tkachiev		The first national championship of independent Kazakhstan.
1993	Serikbay Temirbayev		
1994	Pavel Kotsur		
1995	Serikbay Temirbayev		
1996	Serikbay Temirbayev		
1997	Pavel Kotsur		
1998	Petr Kostenko		
2000	Petr Kostenko		
2001	Darmen Sadvakasov		
2002	Petr Kostenko		Kostenko defeated Pavel Kotsur in a playoff match after they tied for first in the main tournament.
2003	Darmen Sadvakasov		
2004	Darmen Sadvakasov		
2005	Ospan Omarov		
2006	Darmen Sadvakasov		
2007	Darmen Sadvakasov		
2008	Anuar Ismagambetov		
2009	Yevgeniy Pak		
2010	Kirill Kuderinov		
2011	Pavel Kotsur		Kotsur finished ahead of Rinat Jumabayev on tiebreaks.
2012	Anuar Ismagambetov		
2013	Kirill Kuderinov		
2014	Rinat Jumabayev		
2015	Murtas Kazhgaleyev		
2016	Petr Kostenko		Kostenko finished ahead of Rinat Jumabayev and Murtas Kazhgaleyev on tiebreaks.
2017	Rinat Jumabayev		
2018	Murtas Kazhgaleyev		Kazhgaleyev finished ahead of Denis Makhnev on tiebreaks.
2019	Nurlan Ibrayev		
2020	Murtas Kazhgaleyev		
2021	Denis Makhnev		
2022	Ramazan Zhalmakhanov		
2023	Aldiyar Ansat		
2024	Denis Makhnev		
2025	Kazybek Nogerbek	Elnaz Kaliakhmet	Aged 14, Kaliakhmet became the youngest Kazakhstani champion
2026	Sauat Nurgaliyev	Zarina Nurgaliyeva	
