= FIDE World Chess Championship 1999 =

Chess tournament in Las Vegas, Nevada

World Chess Championship 1999
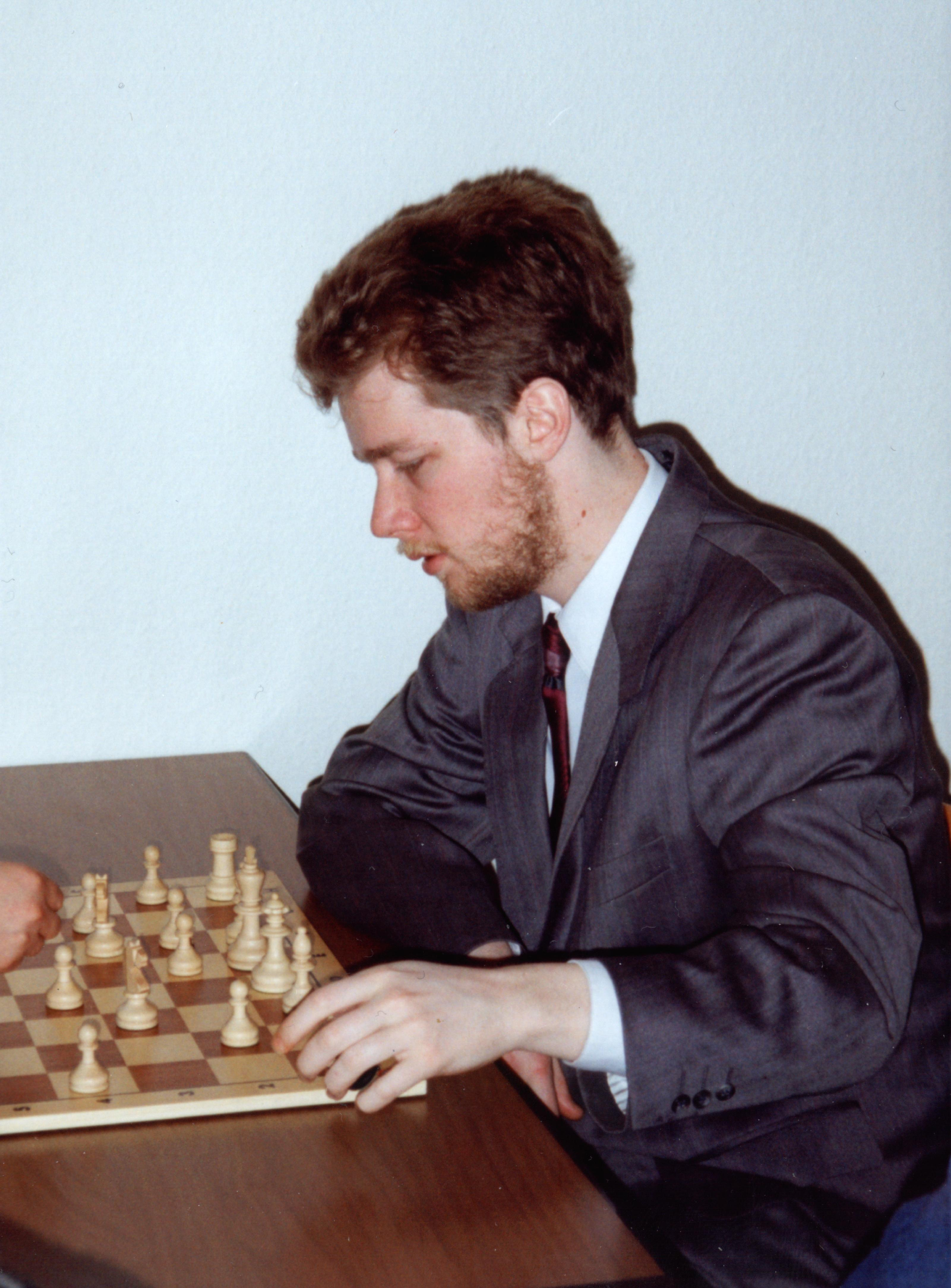
- Alexander Khalifman

Tournament information
- Sport: Chess
- Location: Las Vegas, Nevada, United States
- Dates: 31 July 1999–28 August 1999
- Administrator: FIDE
- Tournament format: Single-elimination tournament
- Host: United States Chess Federation
- Venue: Caesars Palace
- Participants: 100

Final positions
- Champion: (Russia) Alexander Khalifman
- Runner-up: (Armenia) Vladimir Akopian

Tournament statistics
- Matches played: 99

The FIDE World Chess Championship 1999 was held at Caesars Palace on the Las Vegas Strip between 31 July and 28 August 1999. The championship was won by Russian Alexander Khalifman, making him the FIDE World Chess Champion.

== Format ==
The format was a knockout tournament of short matches. This was similar in style to that used at the FIDE World Chess Championship 1998, and had the same advantages and disadvantages.

A change from the 1998 championship was that incumbent champion (Anatoly Karpov) had no special privileges, other than that he (like a number of leading players) was seeded into the second round. In protest at this, Karpov refused to play.

== Controversy and non-participants ==
In addition to Karpov, neither Garry Kasparov nor Viswanathan Anand took part. Kasparov, holder of a rival world championship title, refused to play in any of the FIDE knockout championships, and Anand was negotiating to play a match against Kasparov for his title. (This match never took place – see Classical World Chess Championship 2000.)

Only three players in the top fifteen reached the quarterfinals and by the semifinals most of the favourites had been eliminated. Kasparov called three of the quarterfinalists "tourists", perhaps intending only to reflect the surprising results of the earlier rounds, but the remark raised some controversy.

Winner Khalifman was rated 44th in the world at the time, which some compared unfavourably to PCA champion Kasparov being ranked No. 1. Khalifman said after the tournament, "Rating system works perfectly for players who play only in round robin closed events. I think most of them are overrated. Organizers invite same people over and over because they have the same rating and their rating stays high." Perhaps in response, Khalifman was invited to the next Linares chess tournament, and performed creditably (though placing below joint winner Kasparov).

== Participants ==
1. Vladimir Kramnik (RUS), 2751
2. Alexei Shirov (ESP), 2726
3. Alexander Morozevich^{1} (RUS), 2723
4. Gata Kamsky (USA), 2720
5. Michael Adams (ENG), 2716
6. Vassily Ivanchuk (UKR), 2714
7. Peter Svidler (RUS), 2713
8. Anatoly Karpov^{1} (RUS), 2710
9. Veselin Topalov (BUL), 2700
10. Nigel Short (ENG), 2697
11. Peter Leko (HUN), 2694
12. Boris Gelfand (ISR), 2691
13. Sergei Rublevsky (RUS), 2684
14. Zurab Azmaiparashvili (GEO), 2681
15. Evgeny Bareev (RUS), 2679
16. Judit Polgár (HUN), 2677
17. Viktor Korchnoi (SUI), 2673
18. Valery Salov (RUS), 2670
19. Jan Timman (NED), 2670
20. Matthew Sadler (ENG), 2667
21. Zoltán Almási (HUN), 2665
22. Sergei Shipov (RUS), 2662
23. Kiril Georgiev (BUL), 2659
24. Vadim Zvjaginsev (RUS), 2658
25. Ilya Smirin (ISR), 2652
26. Alexander Beliavsky (SLO), 2650
27. Sergei Movsesian (CZE), 2650
28. Konstantin Sakaev (RUS), 2649
29. Alexei Fedorov (BLR), 2648
30. Michael Krasenkow (POL), 2643
31. Vladimir Akopian (ARM), 2640
32. Vladislav Tkachiev (FRA), 2634
33. Sergei Tiviakov (RUS), 2627
34. Ivan Sokolov (BIH), 2624
35. Boris Gulko (USA), 2620
36. Alexander Khalifman (RUS), 2616
37. Nick DeFirmian (USA), 2610
38. Matthias Wahls (GER), 2609
39. Aleksej Aleksandrov (BLR), 2609
40. Tony Miles (ENG), 2609
41. Ruslan Ponomariov (UKR), 2609
42. Utut Adianto (INA), 2607
43. Rustam Kasimdzhanov (UZB), 2606
44. Jonathan Speelman (ENG), 2601
45. Alex Yermolinsky (USA), 2597
46. Liviu-Dieter Nisipeanu (ROM), 2594
47. Jaan Ehlvest (EST), 2593
48. Joel Benjamin (USA), 2593
49. Sergey Dolmatov (RUS), 2589
50. Gilberto Milos (BRA), 2586
51. Eduardas Rozentalis (LTU), 2577
52. Karen Asrian (ARM), 2576
53. Peng Xiaomin (CHN), 2574
54. Hannes Stefánsson (ISL), 2569
55. Vlastimil Babula (CZE), 2565
56. Zsuzsa Polgar^{1} (HUN), 2565
57. Lev Psakhis (ISR), 2564
58. Hichem Hamdouchi (MAR), 2564
59. Goran Dizdar (CRO), 2563
60. Dragoljub Velimirović^{1} (YUG), 2563
61. Vasilios Kotronias (CYP), 2561
62. Rafael Leitão (BRA), 2559
63. Rogelio Antonio Jr. (PHI), 2558
64. Jordi Magem Badals (ESP), 2557
65. Robert Zelcic (CRO), 2554
66. Bartłomiej Macieja (POL), 2553
67. Maia Chiburdanidze (GEO), 2551
68. Alejandro Sergio Hoffman (ARG), 2547
69. Dmitry Gurevich (USA), 2545
70. Sergey Kudrin (USA), 2543
71. Dimitri Reinderman (NED), 2541
72. Dibyendu Barua (IND), 2538
73. Mikhail Kobalia (RUS), 2537
74. Altin Cela (ALB), 2536
75. Julio Becerra Rivero (CUB), 2535
76. Ralf Åkesson (SWE), 2530
77. Mohammed Al-Modiahki (QAT), 2530
78. Daniel Fridman (LAT), 2529
79. Christian Bauer (FRA), 2528
80. Pablo Ricardi (ARG), 2527
81. Kevin Spraggett (CAN), 2523
82. Stefan Đurić (YUG), 2517
83. Friso Nijboer (NED), 2515
84. Peter Heine Nielsen (DEN), 2515
85. Pavel Kotsur (KAZ), 2511
86. Alexander Ivanov (USA), 2505
87. Levon Aronian (ARM), 2502
88. Andrés Rodríguez (URU), 2500
89. Darmen Sadvakasov (KAZ), 2487
90. Alexander Zubarev (UKR), 2478
91. Tal Shaked (USA), 2477
92. Esam Mohamed Ahmed Nagib (EGY), 2458
93. Alonso Zapata (COL), 2454
94. Imad Hakki^{2} (SYR), 2423
95. Liang Chong (CHN), 2400
96. Watu Kobese (RSA), 2389
97. Slim Bouaziz (TUN), 2387
98. Amir Bagheri^{2} (IRI), 2368
99. Alexander Kozak (RUS), 2330
100. Vladimir Feldman (AUS), 2330

^{1} Morozevich, Karpov, Z. Polgar, and Velimirovic had to be replaced with the following players:

- Alexey Dreev (RUS)
- Vadim Milov (SUI)
- Ulf Andersson (SWE)
- Joël Lautier (FRA)

^{2} Hakki and Bagheri did not appear due to the visa problems.

== Results, rounds 1–4 ==
=== Section 1 ===
First round
33	(Russia) Sergei Tiviakov	4½
69	(United States) Dmitry Gurevich	3½
49	(Russia) Sergey Dolmatov	2½
85	(Kazakhstan) Pavel Kotsur	1½
41	(Ukraine) Ruslan Ponomariov	1½
77	(Qatar) Mohammed Al-Modiahki	½
57	(Israel) Lev Psakhis	2½
93	(Colombia) Alonso Zapata	1½

Second round
1	(Russia) Vladimir Kramnik	1½
33	(Russia) Sergei Tiviakov	½
17	(Switzerland) Viktor Korchnoi	4
49	(Russia) Sergey Dolmatov	2
9	(Bulgaria) Veselin Topalov	4
41	(Ukraine) Ruslan Ponomariov	2
25	(Israel) Ilya Smirin	1½
57	(Israel) Lev Psakhis	2½

Third round
1	(Russia) Vladimir Kramnik	1½
17	(Switzerland) Viktor Korchnoi	½
9	(Bulgaria) Veselin Topalov	1½
57	(Israel) Lev Psakhis	½

Fourth round
1	(Russia) Vladimir Kramnik	3
9	(Bulgaria) Veselin Topalov	1

=== Section 2 ===
First round
37	(United States) Nick DeFirmian	½
73	(Russia) Mikhail Kobalia	1½
53	(China) Peng Xiaomin	1½
89	(Kazakhstan) Darmen Sadvakasov	½
45	(United States) Alex Yermolinsky	2½
81	(Canada) Kevin Spraggett	1½
65	(Croatia) Robert Zelcic	2½
(Russia) Alexey Dreev	3½
61	(Cyprus) Vasilios Kotronias	1½
97	(Tunisia) Slim Bouaziz	½

Second round
5	(England) Michael Adams	2
73	(Russia) Mikhail Kobalia	0
21	(Hungary) Zoltán Almási	3
53	(China) Peng Xiaomin	1
13	(Russia) Sergei Rublevsky	3
45	(United States) Alex Yermolinsky	1
(Russia) Alexey Dreev	1½
61	(Cyprus) Vasilios Kotronias	½

Third round
5	(England) Michael Adams	1½
21	(Hungary) Zoltán Almási	½
13	(Russia) Sergei Rublevsky	½
(Russia) Alexey Dreev	1½

Fourth round
5	(England) Michael Adams	4
(Russia) Alexey Dreev	2

=== Section 3 ===
First round
35	(United States) Boris Gulko	1½
71	(Netherlands) Dimitri Reinderman	½
51	(Lithuania) Eduardas Rozentalis	0
87	(Armenia) Levon Aronian	2
43	(Uzbekistan) Rustam Kasimdzhanov	½
79	(France) Christian Bauer	1½
59	(Croatia) Goran Dizdar	1½
95	(China) Liang Chong	½

Second round
29	(Belarus) Alexei Fedorov	1½
35	(United States) Boris Gulko	½
19	(Netherlands) Jan Timman	1½
87	(Armenia) Levon Aronian	½
11	(Hungary) Peter Leko	1½
79	(France) Christian Bauer	½
27	(Czech Republic) Sergei Movsesian	2
59	(Croatia) Goran Dizdar	0

Third round
29	(Belarus) Alexei Fedorov	1½
19	(Netherlands) Jan Timman	½
11	(Hungary) Peter Leko	1½
27	(Czech Republic) Sergei Movsesian	2½

Fourth round
29	(Belarus) Alexei Fedorov	2½
27	(Czech Republic) Sergei Movsesian	3½

=== Section 4 ===
First round
39	(Belarus) Aleksej Aleksandrov	2
75	(Cuba) Julio Becerra Rivero	0
55	(Czech Republic) Vlastimil Babula	1½
91	(United States) Tal Shaked	2½
47	(Estonia) Jaan Ehlvest	1½
83	(Netherlands) Friso Nijboer	½
31	(Armenia) Vladimir Akopian	1½
67	(Georgia (country)) Maia Chiburdanidze	½
63	(Philippines) Rogelio Antonio Jr.	2
99	(Russia) Alexander Kozak	0

Second round
7	(Russia) Peter Svidler	1½
39	(Belarus) Aleksej Aleksandrov	½
23	(Bulgaria) Kiril Georgiev	2
91	(United States) Tal Shaked	0
15	(Russia) Evgeny Bareev	1½
47	(Estonia) Jaan Ehlvest	½
31	(Armenia) Vladimir Akopian	2½
63	(Philippines) Rogelio Antonio Jr.	1½

Third round
7	(Russia) Peter Svidler	½
23	(Bulgaria) Kiril Georgiev	1½
15	(Russia) Evgeny Bareev	1½
31	(Armenia) Vladimir Akopian	2½

Fourth round
23	(Bulgaria) Kiril Georgiev	½
31	(Armenia) Vladimir Akopian	1½

=== Section 5 ===
First round
34	(Bosnia and Herzegovina) Ivan Sokolov	1½
70	(United States) Sergey Kudrin	½
50	(Brazil) Gilberto Milos	1½
86	(United States) Alexander Ivanov	½
42	(Indonesia) Utut Adianto	0
78	(Latvia) Daniel Fridman	2
58	(Morocco) Hichem Hamdouchi	w/o
94	(Syria) Imad Hakki

Second round
2	(Spain) Alexei Shirov	2½
34	(Bosnia and Herzegovina) Ivan Sokolov	1½
18	(Russia) Valery Salov	0
50	(Brazil) Gilberto Milos	2
10	(England) Nigel Short	1½
78	(Latvia) Daniel Fridman	½
26	(Slovenia) Alexander Beliavsky	1½
58	(Morocco) Hichem Hamdouchi	½

Third round
2	(Spain) Alexei Shirov	3
50	(Brazil) Gilberto Milos	1
10	(England) Nigel Short	1½
26	(Slovenia) Alexander Beliavsky	½

Fourth round
2	(Spain) Alexei Shirov	1½
10	(England) Nigel Short	½

=== Section 6 ===
First round
38	(Germany) Matthias Wahls	1½
74	(Albania) Altin Cela	½
54	(Iceland) Hannes Stefánsson	3½
90	(Ukraine) Alexander Zubarev	2½
46	(Romania) Liviu-Dieter Nisipeanu	2
82	(Federal Republic of Yugoslavia) Stefan Đurić	0
66	(Poland) Bartłomiej Macieja	2½
(Switzerland) Vadim Milov	1½
62	(Brazil) Rafael Leitão	w/o
98	(Iran) Amir Bagheri

Second round
6	(Ukraine) Vassily Ivanchuk	2
38	(Germany) Matthias Wahls	0
22	(Russia) Sergei Shipov	2½
54	(Iceland) Hannes Stefánsson	1½
14	(Georgia (country)) Zurab Azmaiparashvili	1½
46	(Romania) Liviu-Dieter Nisipeanu	2½
66	(Poland) Bartłomiej Macieja	½
62	(Brazil) Rafael Leitão	1½

Third round
6	(Ukraine) Vassily Ivanchuk	2
22	(Russia) Sergei Shipov	0
46	(Romania) Liviu-Dieter Nisipeanu	2½
62	(Brazil) Rafael Leitão	1½

Fourth round
6	(Ukraine) Vassily Ivanchuk	1½
46	(Romania) Liviu-Dieter Nisipeanu	2½

=== Section 7 ===
First round
36	(Russia) Alexander Khalifman	3½
72	(India) Dibyendu Barua	2½
52	(Armenia) Karen Asrian	2½
88	(Uruguay) Andrés Rodríguez	1½
44	(England) Jon Speelman	1½
80	(Argentina) Pablo Ricardi	½
96	(South Africa) Watu Kobese	0
(France) Joël Lautier	2

Second round
4	(United States) Gata Kamsky	1½
36	(Russia) Alexander Khalifman	2½
20	(England) Matthew Sadler	½
52	(Armenia) Karen Asrian	1½
12	(Israel) Boris Gelfand	1½
44	(England) Jon Speelman	½
28	(Russia) Konstantin Sakaev	1½
(France) Joël Lautier	2½

Third round
36	(Russia) Alexander Khalifman	1½
52	(Armenia) Karen Asrian	½
12	(Israel) Boris Gelfand	4
(France) Joël Lautier	2

Fourth round
36	(Russia) Alexander Khalifman	2½
12	(Israel) Boris Gelfand	1½

=== Section 8 ===
First round
40	(England) Tony Miles	2½
76	(Sweden) Ralf Åkesson	1½
92	(Egypt) Esam Mohamed Ahmed Nagib	0
(Sweden) Ulf Andersson	2
48	(United States) Joel Benjamin	3
84	(Denmark) Peter Heine Nielsen	4
32	(France) Vladislav Tkachiev	2
68	(Argentina) Alejandro Sergio Hoffman	0
64	(Spain) Jordi Magem Badals	2
100	(Australia) Vladimir Feldman	0

Second round
30	(Poland) Michael Krasenkow	2½
40	(England) Tony Miles	1½
24	(Russia) Vadim Zvjaginsev	2½
(Sweden) Ulf Andersson	1½
16	(Hungary) Judit Polgár	1½
84	(Denmark) Peter Heine Nielsen	½
32	(France) Vladislav Tkachiev	1
64	(Spain) Jordi Magem Badals	3

Third round
30	(Poland) Michael Krasenkow	½
24	(Russia) Vadim Zvjaginsev	1½
16	(Hungary) Judit Polgár	1½
64	(Spain) Jordi Magem Badals	½

Fourth round
24	(Russia) Vadim Zvjaginsev	1
16	(Hungary) Judit Polgár	3

== Results, rounds 5–7 ==
Quarterfinals
1	(Russia) Vladimir Kramnik	2
5	(England) Michael Adams	4
27	(Czech Republic) Sergei Movsesian	1½
31	(Armenia) Vladimir Akopian	2½
2	(Spain) Alexei Shirov	½
46	(Romania) Liviu-Dieter Nisipeanu	1½
36	(Russia) Alexander Khalifman	1½
16	(Hungary) Judit Polgár	½

Semifinals (best of 4)
5	(England) Michael Adams	½
31	(Armenia) Vladimir Akopian	2½
46	(Romania) Liviu-Dieter Nisipeanu	2½
36	(Russia) Alexander Khalifman	3½

Final (best of 6)
31	(Armenia) Vladimir Akopian	2½
36	(Russia) Alexander Khalifman	3½

== Championship final ==
FIDE World Chess Championship Final 1999
	Rating	1	2	3	4	5	6	Points
Vladimir Akopian (Armenia)	2640	0	½	1	0	½	½	2½
Alexander Khalifman (Russia)	2616	1	½	0	1	½	½	3½
