= Vlastimil Babula =

Czech chess grandmaster (born 1973)

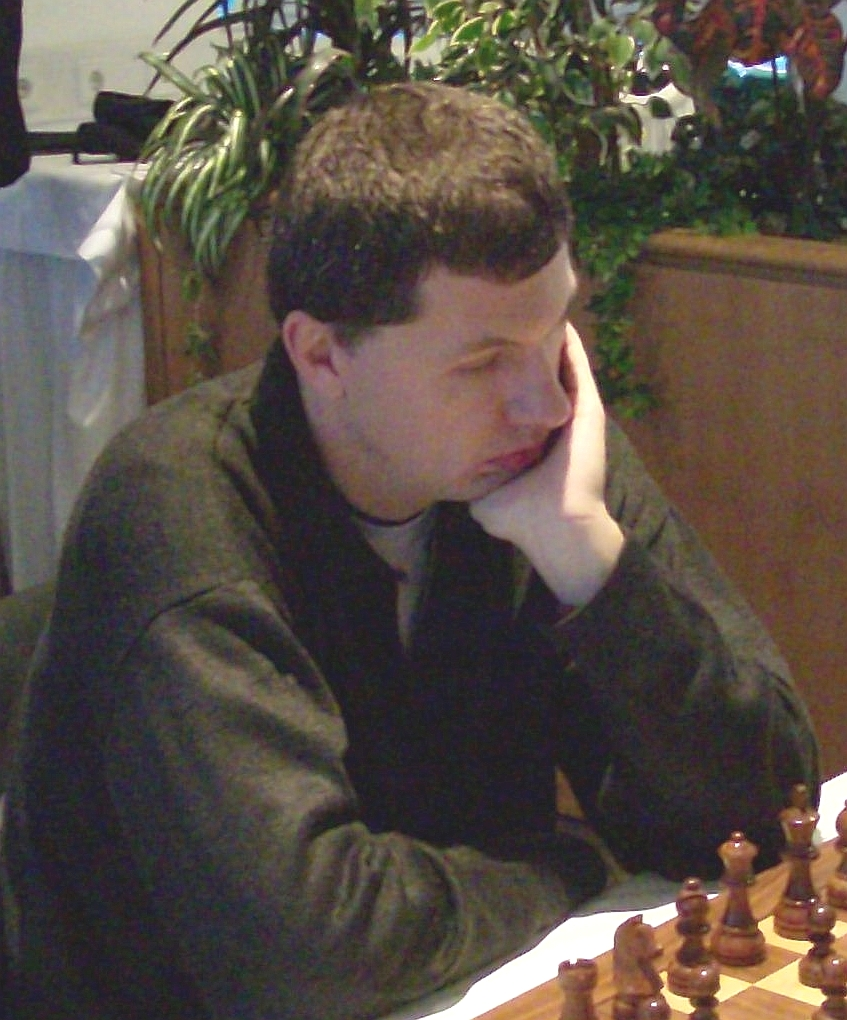
- Vlastimil Babula, 2007

Personal information
- Born: 2 October 1973 (age 52) Uherský Brod, Czechoslovakia

Chess career
- Country: Czech Republic
- Title: Grandmaster (1997)
- FIDE rating: 2489 (July 2026)
- Peak rating: 2608 (October 2008)

Vlastimil Babula (born 2 October 1973) is a chess grandmaster from the Czech Republic who was Czech Champion in 1993 and second at the World Junior Championship of 1993.

== Chess career ==
In 1998 Babula tied for 1st–4th with Liviu-Dieter Nisipeanu, Bartłomiej Macieja and Zoltán Almási in the Zone 1.4 zonal tournament in Krynica and qualified to the FIDE World Chess Championship 1999 where he was knocked out in the first round by Tal Shaked. In 2007, he was joint winner of the Czech Open (with Viktor Láznička). He took part in the Chess World Cup 2011, but was eliminated in the first round by Zahar Efimenko.

Babula played for the Czech Republic in the Chess Olympiads of 1994, 1996, 1998, 2000, 2002, 2004, 2006, 2008, 2010 and 2012.
