= Stefan Đurić (chess player) =

Serbian chess grandmaster (born 1955)

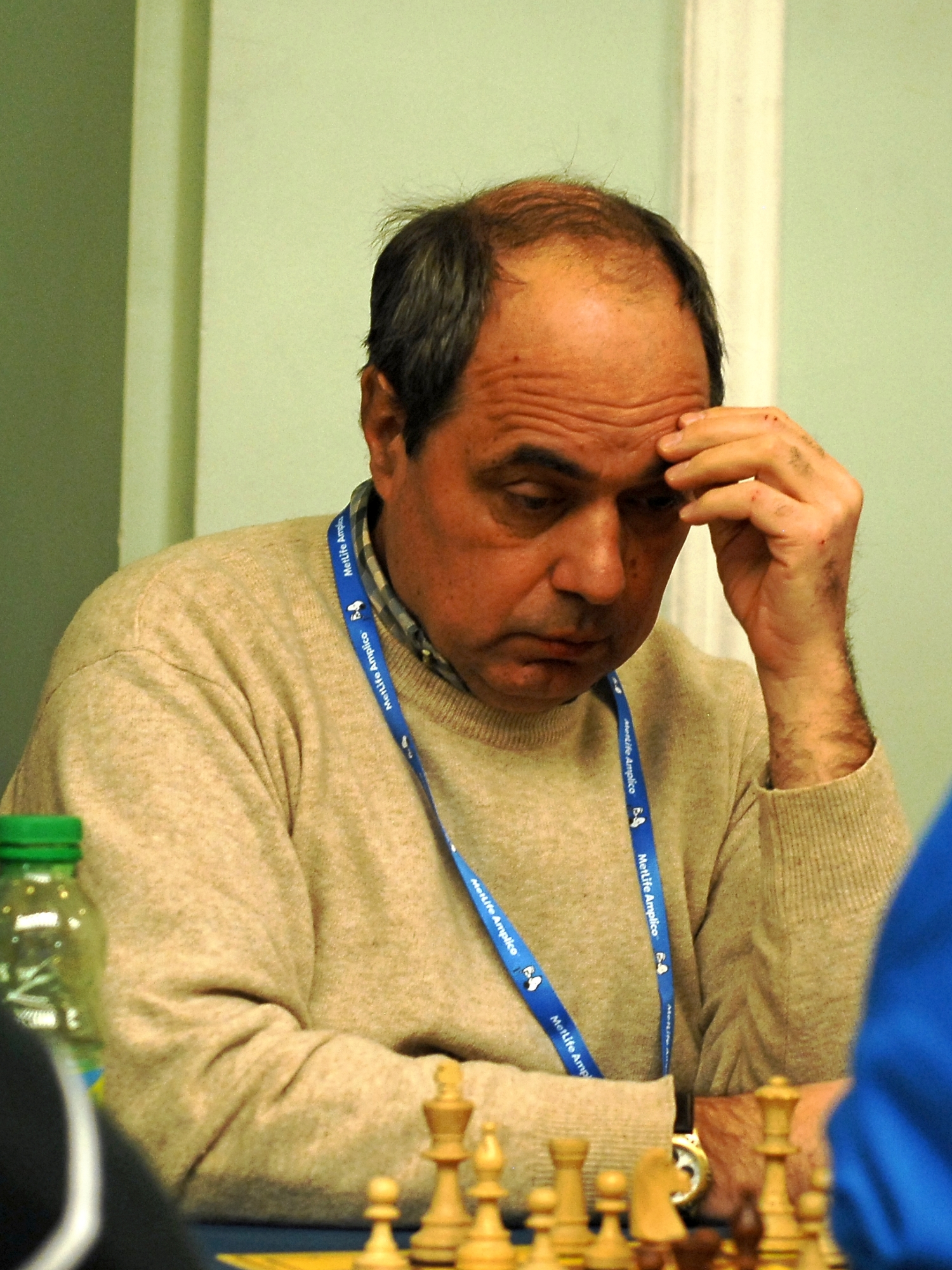
- Stefan Đurić in 2012

Personal information
- Born: 26 July 1955 (age 70) Belgrade, Serbia

Chess career
- Country: Yugoslavia; Serbia
- Title: Grandmaster (1982)
- Peak rating: 2560 (July 1996)
- Peak ranking: No. 53 (January 1983)

Stefan Đurić (Serbian: Стефан Ђурић; born 26 July 1955) is a Serbian chess grandmaster (1982). He is a European Team Chess Championship two time silver medalist (1983, 1989).

== Biography ==
Stefan Đurić notably participated in the finals of the Yugoslav Chess Championships in 1984 (8 points out of 16) and in 1985 (11½ out of 17 points, shared 3rd - 4th place). He shared 1st - 4th place in Australian Open in 1991 and North Sea Cup in 2006. He won Australian Open in 2001. In 1998, in Panormo (Greece) Stefan Đurić won 3rd place in the Zonal Chess Tournament and qualified for the World Chess Championship by knock-out system. In FIDE World Chess Championship in 1991 in Las Vegas he lost in 1st round against Liviu-Dieter Nisipeanu.

Stefan Đurić played for Yugoslavia in the European Team Chess Championships:

- In 1983, at first reserve board in the 8th European Team Chess Championship in Plovdiv (+3, =1, -0) and won team silver and individual gold medals,
- In 1989, at second reserve board in the 9th European Team Chess Championship in Haifa (+1, =1, -0) and won team silver medal.

Stefan Đurić played for Yugoslavia in the Men's Chess Mitropa Cups:

- In 1978, at reserve board in the 3rd Chess Mitropa Cup in Ciocco (+6, =0, -0) and won team gold medal,
- In 1979, at fourth board in the 4th Chess Mitropa Cup in Bern (+4, =1, -1) and won team and individual gold medals,
- In 1981, at second board in the 6th Chess Mitropa Cup in Luxembourg (+4, =1, -0) and won team and individual gold medals,
- In 1983, at first board in the 8th Chess Mitropa Cup in Lienz (+3, =3, -0) and won team gold medal,
- In 1985, at first board in the 10th Chess Mitropa Cup in Aranđelovac (+1, =2, -2) and won team gold medal,
- In 1991, at fourth board in the 14th Chess Mitropa Cup in Brno (+4, =1, -1) and won team gold medal.

Stefan Đurić played for Yugoslavia in the Men's Chess Balkaniad:

- In 1983, at third board in the 15th Chess Balkaniad in Băile Herculane (+0, =2, -0) and won team gold and individual bronze medals,
- In 1985, at fifth board in the 17th Chess Balkaniad in Irakleio (+0, =2, -0) and won team and individual gold medals,
- In 1988, at first board in the 19th Chess Balkaniad in Kaštel Stari (+0, =2, -0) and won team silver medal.

In 1978, Stefan Đurić was awarded the FIDE International Master (IM) title and received the FIDE Grandmaster (GM) title four years later.
