= Vladimir Feldman =

Australian chess player (born 1959)

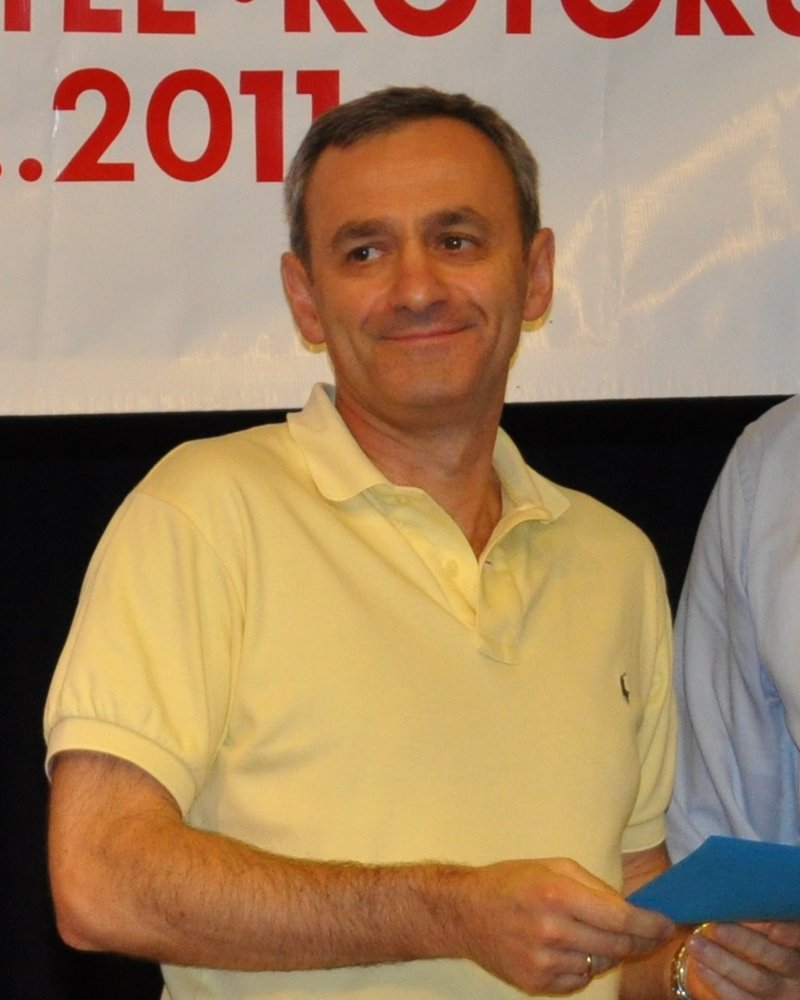
- Vladimir Feldman at the Oceania Zonal Chess Championship, Rotorua 2011.

Personal information
- Born: 13 September 1959 (age 66) Zhytomyr, Ukrainian SSR, Soviet Union
- Spouse: Irina Berezina

Chess career
- Country: Soviet Union; Russia (1992); Australia
- Title: International Master (2000)
- Peak rating: 2399 (January 2000)

Vladimir Feldman (born 13 September 1959 in Zhytomyr) is an Australian chess International Master and trainer.

Upon moving to Australia and gaining Australian Citizenship in the early 1990s, Feldman won the City of Sydney Chess Championship in 1993 and 1994, and the New South Wales Chess Championship in 1995.

In 1999, Feldman won the inaugural Oceania Zonal Chess Championship, held on the Gold Coast, Australia. As a result, he was awarded the title of International Master (IM) and qualified to play in the FIDE World Chess Championship 1999. In this competition he was eliminated in round 1 by Jordi Magem Badals from Spain.

Feldman represented Australia in the 2008 World Mind Sports Games in Beijing, China. He played for team Canberra in the 2012 World Cities Chess Championship in Al Ain, UAE.

Feldman has a master's degree in Chess Coaching from the State Institute of Physical Culture, Moscow, and is the co-owner of "Chess Masters", a chess coaching business in Sydney, with his wife, IM Irina Berezina. In 2005, he was awarded the FIDE Trainer title.
