= Mikhail Rychagov =

Estonian chess grandmaster (born 1967)

Mihhail Rõtšagov
Personal information
- Born: November 12, 1967 (age 58)

Chess career
- Country: Estonia
- Title: Grandmaster (1997)
- FIDE rating: 2457 (July 2026)
- Peak rating: 2565 (July 1998)

Mihhail Rõtšagov (born 12 November 1967) is an Estonian chess Grandmaster.

== Career ==
He played for Estonia in the Chess Olympiads of 1992, 1994, 1996, 1998, 2000, 2002 and in the European Team Chess Championships of 1992 and 1997. In 1999, he won the 21st Festival in Arco, Italy; in 2000, he tied for 2nd–3rd with Eirik Gullaksen in the Norwegian Rapid Chess Championship and tied for 1st–6th with Viktor Gavrikov, Mark Taimanov, Patrik Lyrberg, Alexander Kochyev and Olli Salmensuu in the Hartwall Heart Of Finland open tournament. In the same year, he participated in the FIDE World Chess Championship, where he was knocked out by Étienne Bacrot in the first round.

According to Chessmetrics, at his peak in October 2000 Rõtšagov's play was equivalent to a rating of 2582, and he was ranked number 156 in the world. His best single performance was at the European Team Chess Championship in Pula 1997, where he scored 5.5 of 9 possible points (61%) against 2564-rated opposition, for a performance rating of 2611.

In the November 2009 FIDE list, he has an Elo rating of 2472, making him Estonia's number three.

In 2011, he was awarded the title of FIDE Senior Trainer. As a trainer/second, he worked with Alexey Shirov.
