= Boris Katalymov =

Kazakhstani chess player (1932–2013)

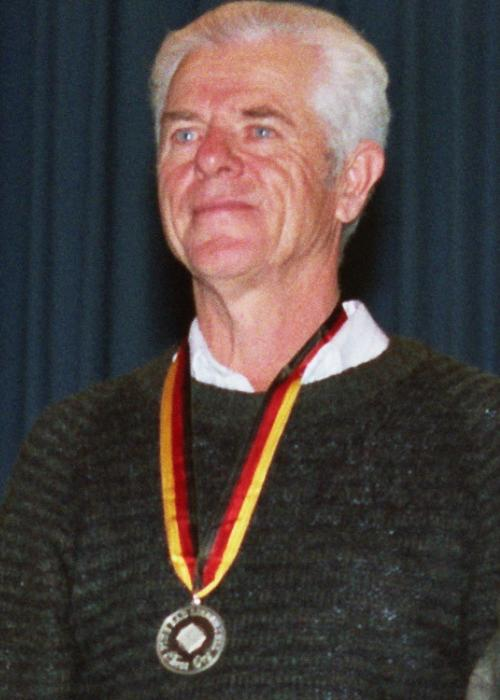
- Katalymov at Bad Liebenzell in 1995

Personal information
- Full name: Boris Nikolaevich Katalymov
- Born: 13 June 1932 Lunga Maidan, Mordovian ASSR, Soviet Union
- Died: 1 February 2013 (aged 80) Almaty, Kazakhstan

Chess career
- Country: Soviet Union → Kazakhstan
- Title: International Master (1996)
- Peak rating: 2460 (July 1995)

Boris Katalymov (Russian: Борис Николаевич Каталымов, romanized: Boris Nikolaevich Katalymov or Katalimov; 13 June 1932 – 1 February 2013) was a Soviet (Russian) and later Kazakhstani chess player. He spent his youth in Lvov playing in the same junior tournaments and for the same junior team as legendary Leonid Stein. He was awarded the title of International Master by FIDE in 1996. Katalymov was a multi-time champion of Kazakhstan. He won silver in the 1995 World Senior Chess Championship, held in Bad Liebenzell, Germany. The Katalymov Variation of the Sicilian Defence is named after him.. Boris Nikolaevich spent his later years teaching chess to young children and teenagers at the 'School Palace' in Almaty, Kazakhstan.
