= Pavel Kotsur =

Kazakhstani chess grandmaster (born 1974)

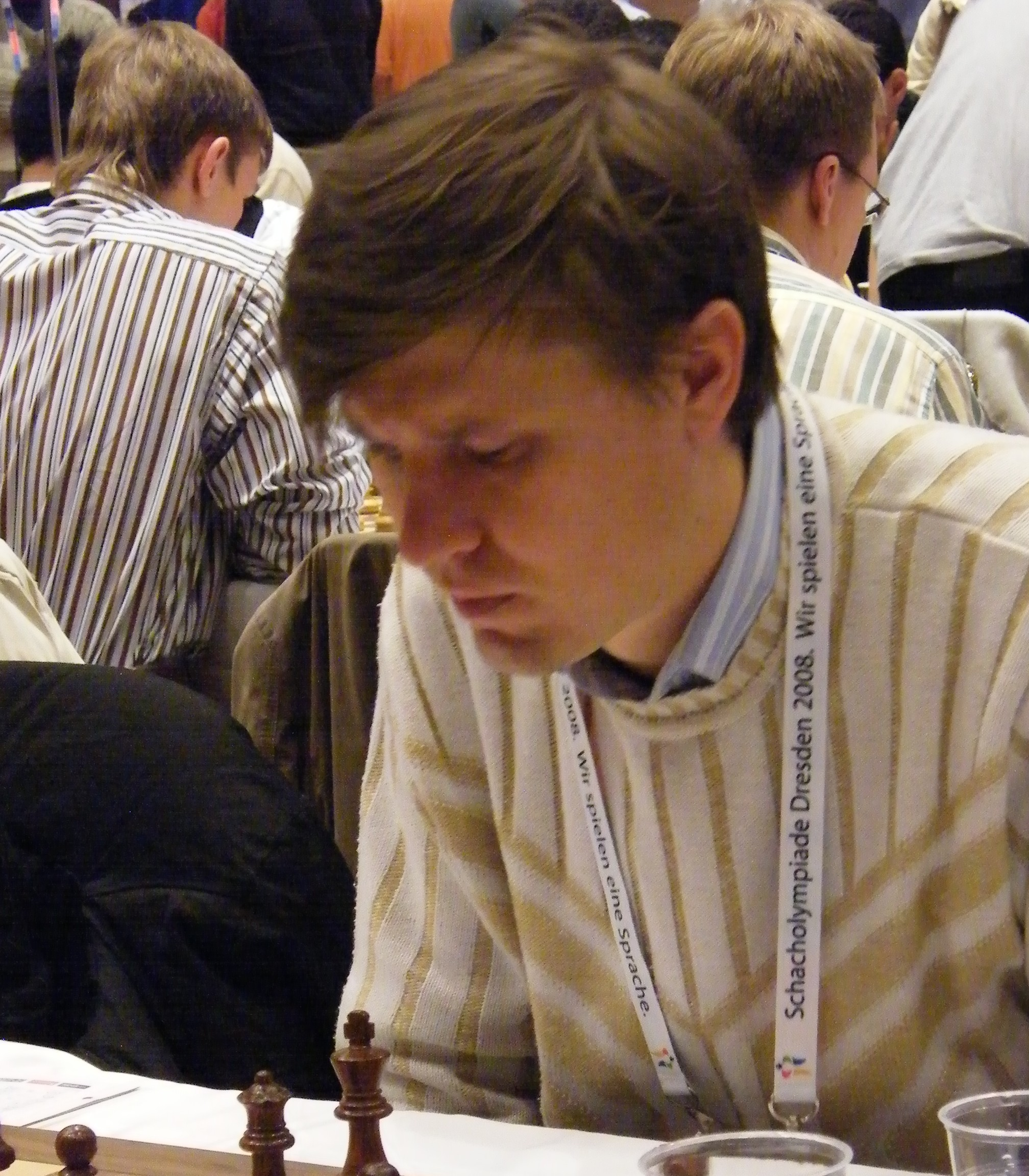
- Kotsur at the Dresden Olympiad, 2008

Personal information
- Born: 3 January 1973 (age 53)

Chess career
- Country: Kazakhstan
- Title: Grandmaster (1996)
- FIDE rating: 2484 (July 2026)
- Peak rating: 2607 (July 2004)
- Peak ranking: No. 91 (July 2001)

Pavel Mikhailovich Kotsur (Russian: Павел Михайлович Коцур; born 3 January 1974) is a chess player from Kazakhstan who holds the titles Grandmaster (1996) and FIDE Arbiter (2009). He is a three-time Kazakhstani Chess Champion.

== Career ==
Kotsur earned his international master title in 1993 and his grandmaster title in 1996. He won the Kazakhstani Chess Championship in 1994, 1997 and 2011. He played for Kazakhstan in the Chess Olympiads of 1994, 1996, 1998, 2000, 2002 and 2008 and in the World Team Chess Championship of 1997. He took part in the FIDE World Chess Championship in 1999 (knocked out in the first round by Sergey Dolmatov), 2002 (knocked out in the first round by Leinier Domínguez) and 2004 (knocked out in the first round by Darmen Sadvakasov).

In 1999, Kotsur won the 4th stage of the Russia Cup in Novgorod. In 2004 he tied for 4th–16th in the 3rd Aeroflot Open in Moscow.

In the March 2011 FIDE list, he has an Elo rating of 2562, making him Kazakhstan's number four.
