= Amir Bagheri =

Iranian chess grandmaster (born 1978)

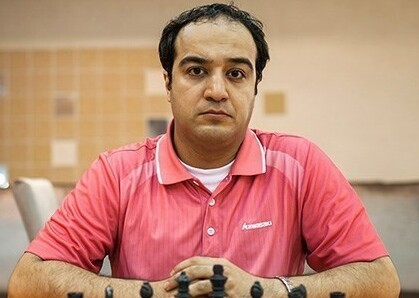

Personal information
- Born: September 20, 1978 (age 47) Tehran, Iran

Chess career
- Country: Iran (until 2005; 2008–2021); France (2005–2007); Monaco (since 2021)
- Title: Grandmaster (2003)
- Peak rating: 2541 (October 2003)

Amir Bagheri (Persian: امیر باقری; born September 20, 1978) is an Iranian-Monegasque chess grandmaster. He is the second Iranian to achieve the grandmaster title.

He qualified for the FIDE World Chess Championship 1999 but did not play due to visa problems. He was knocked out in the first round of the FIDE World Chess Championship 2000.

Bagheri played for Iran in the Chess Olympiads of 1998, 2000 and 2008.
