= Alejandra Guerrero Rodríguez =

Mexican chess player (born 1974)

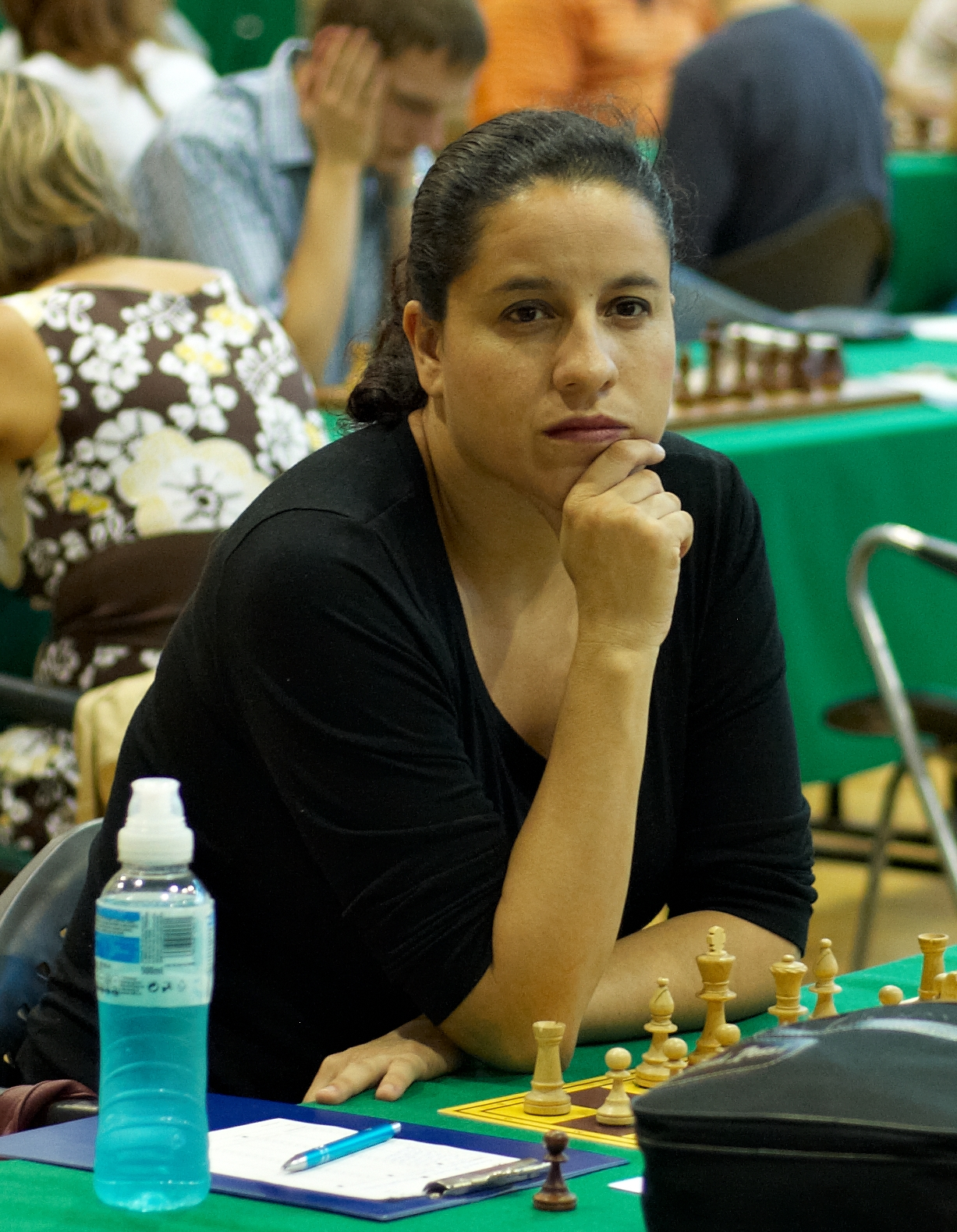
- Guerrero in 2012

Personal information
- Born: 5 November 1974 (age 51) Durango City, Mexico
- Spouse: Bartłomiej Macieja (m. 2012)

Chess career
- Country: Mexico
- Title: Woman International Master (2001)
- Peak rating: 2157 (April 2006)

Alejandra Guerrero Rodríguez (born 5 November 1974 in Durango City) is a Mexican chess player. She has been a FIDE-recognized Woman International Master (WIM) since 2004.

== Career ==
Guerrero won gold in the Mexican Junior Chess Championships in 1993 and 1994, then placed 36th in the World Junior Chess Championship. In 1999, she won the 13th Pan American Chess Championships in San Felipe. Guerrero placed fifth in the 2007 Zonal 2.3 tournament in Santo Domingo. Three years later, she placed ninth in the Pan-American Chess Championships in Campinas.

Guerrero won the 2017 Mexican Chess Championship in Valladolid, Yucatán. She placed ninth at a national game held in her home city on 20 August 2018.

== Personal life ==
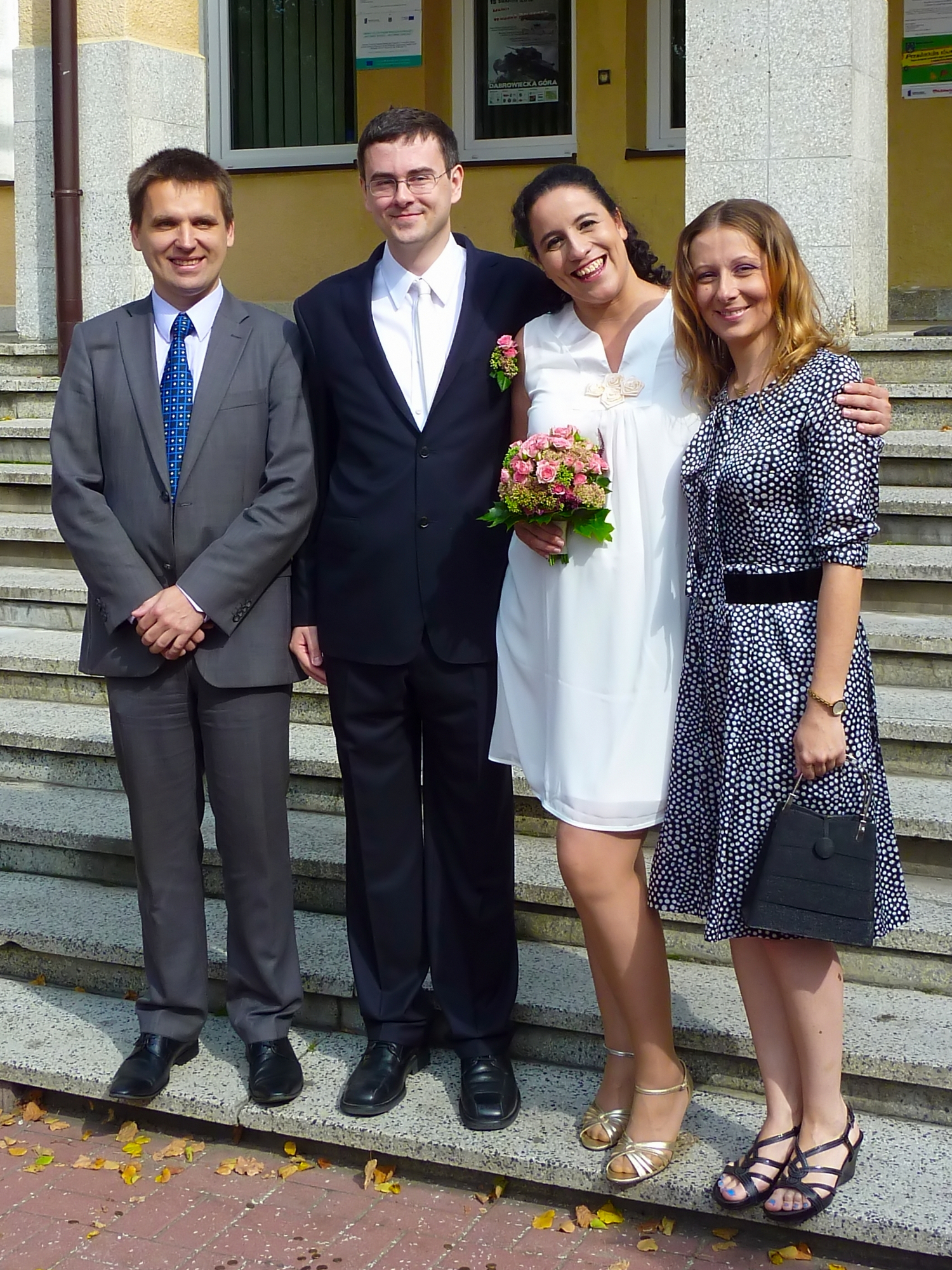
From left to right: Bartosz Soćko, Bartłomiej Macieja, Alejandra Guerrero, and Monika Soćko

Guerrero was born into a household with a lineage of chess; her father, Alfonso Guerrero Iturbe, was the chess master of Durango City in 1993. On 18 August 2012, Guerrero married Polish grandmaster Bartłomiej Macieja in Celestynów. Fellow grandmasters Monika and Bartosz Soćko were in attendance.
