= 1972 USSR Chess Championship =

Soviet chess tournament

40th Soviet Chess Championship
- Location: Baku

Champion
- Mikhail Tal

The 1972 Soviet Chess Championship was the 40th edition of USSR Chess Championship. Held from 16 November to 19 December 1972 in Baku. The tournament was won by Mikhail Tal. The final were preceded by semifinals events at Chelyabinsk, Uzhgorod, Kaliningrad and Odessa.

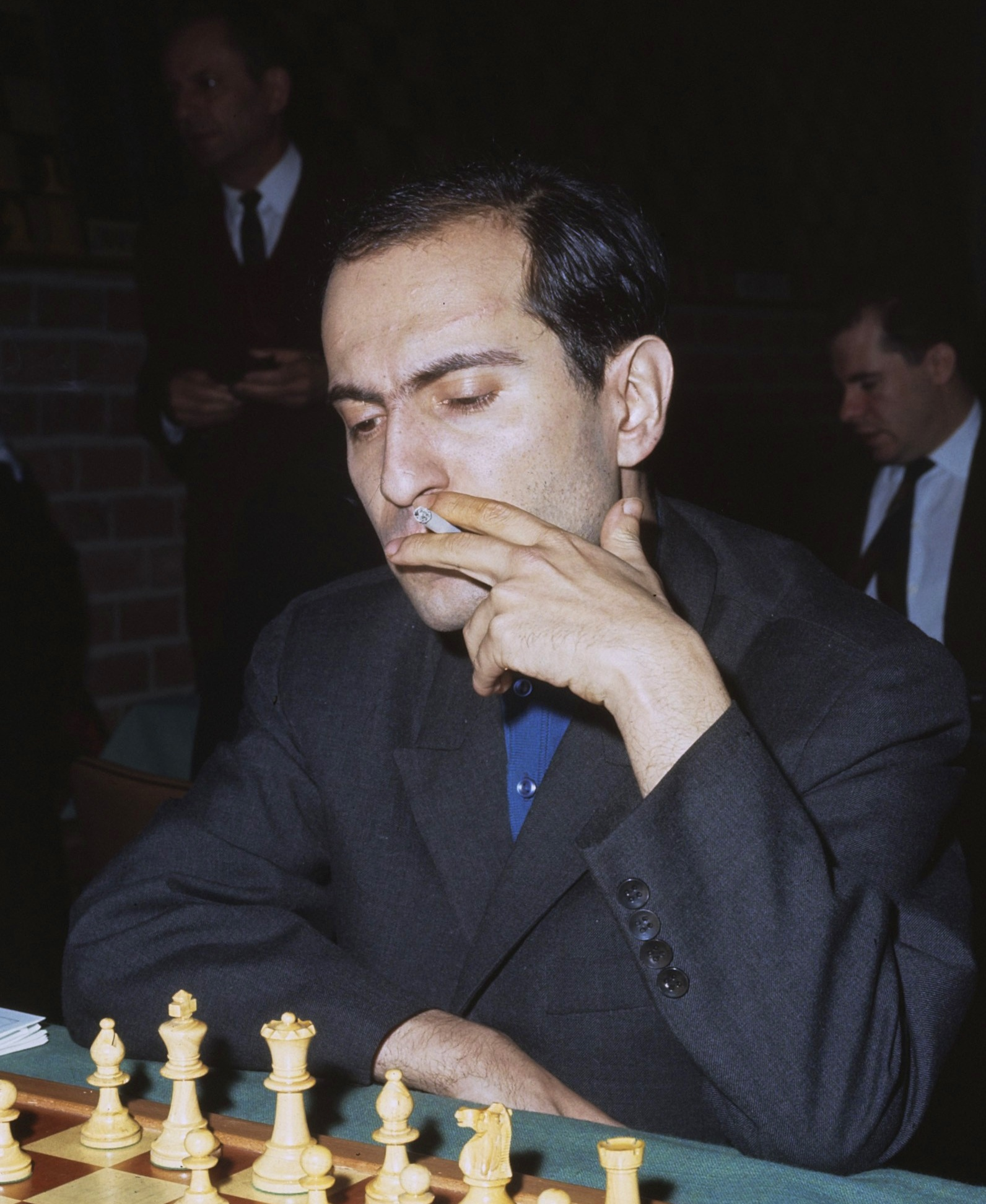
Mikhail Tal

== Table and results ==
40th Soviet Chess Championship
	Player	1	2	3	4	5	6	7	8	9	10	11	12	13	14	15	16	17	18	19	20	21	22	Total
1	(Soviet Union) Mikhail Tal	-	½	½	1	1	½	1	½	1	½	½	½	½	½	1	1	½	½	1	½	1	1	15
2	(Soviet Union) Vladimir Tukmakov	½	-	½	0	½	0	½	½	1	0	1	1	½	½	1	½	½	1	1	1	½	1	13
3	(Soviet Union) Gennadi Kuzmin	½	½	-	½	1	½	½	½	1	½	1	0	1	½	½	0	½	1	1	½	½	½	12½
4	(Soviet Union) Vladimir Savon	0	1	½	-	½	½	1	½	½	1	½	½	½	½	½	½	1	0	½	1	½	1	12½
5	(Soviet Union) Mikhail Mukhin	0	½	0	½	-	1	½	½	½	½	½	1	½	½	1	1	1	½	1	½	½	½	12½
6	(Soviet Union) Evgeni Vasiukov	½	1	½	½	0	-	1	1	½	0	0	1	1	1	0	1	0	0	½	½	½	1	11½
7	(Soviet Union) Yuri Balashov	0	½	½	0	½	0	-	1	½	1	1	½	½	1	½	½	½	1	½	1	0	½	11½
8	(Soviet Union) Vladimir Bagirov	½	½	½	½	½	0	0	-	1	½	½	½	½	½	½	1	½	½	½	1	1	0	11
9	(Soviet Union) Semyon Furman	0	0	0	½	½	½	½	0	-	1	0	½	½	1	1	1	1	½	½	½	1	½	11
10	(Soviet Union) Ratmir Kholmov	½	1	½	0	½	1	0	½	0	-	1	½	0	½	0	1	½	1	½	½	½	½	10½
11	(Soviet Union) Anatoly Lein	½	0	0	½	½	1	0	½	1	0	-	½	½	1	½	1	½	½	½	0	½	1	10½
12	(Soviet Union) Yuri Razuvaev	½	0	1	½	0	0	½	½	½	½	½	-	½	½	½	½	1	½	0	½	½	1	10
13	(Soviet Union) Albert Kapengut	½	½	0	½	½	0	½	½	½	1	½	½	-	½	1	0	½	½	0	½	½	½	9½
14	(Soviet Union) Roman Dzindzichashvili	½	½	½	½	½	0	0	½	0	½	0	½	½	-	1	0	½	0	½	1	1	1	9½
15	(Soviet Union) Leonid Shamkovich	0	0	½	½	0	1	½	½	0	1	½	½	0	0	-	½	½	1	½	1	½	½	9½
16	(Soviet Union) David Bronstein	0	½	1	½	0	0	½	0	0	0	0	½	1	1	½	-	½	½	½	½	1	1	9½
17	(Soviet Union) Eduard Gufeld	½	½	½	0	0	1	½	½	0	½	½	0	½	½	½	½	-	1	½	½	½	0	9
18	(Soviet Union) Karen Grigorian	½	0	0	1	½	1	0	½	½	0	½	½	½	1	0	½	0	-	0	½	½	1	9
19	(Soviet Union) Valery Zilberstein	0	0	0	½	0	½	½	½	½	½	½	1	1	½	½	½	½	1	-	½	0	0	9
20	(Soviet Union) Nukhim Rashkovsky	½	0	½	0	½	½	0	0	½	½	1	½	½	0	0	½	½	½	½	-	1	1	9
21	(Soviet Union) Valery Zhidkov	0	½	½	½	½	½	1	0	0	½	½	½	½	0	½	0	½	½	1	0	-	½	8½
22	(Soviet Union) Lev Alburt	0	0	½	0	½	0	½	1	½	½	0	0	½	0	½	0	1	0	1	0	½	-	7
