= Buenaventura Villamayor =

Filipino chess grandmaster (born 1967)

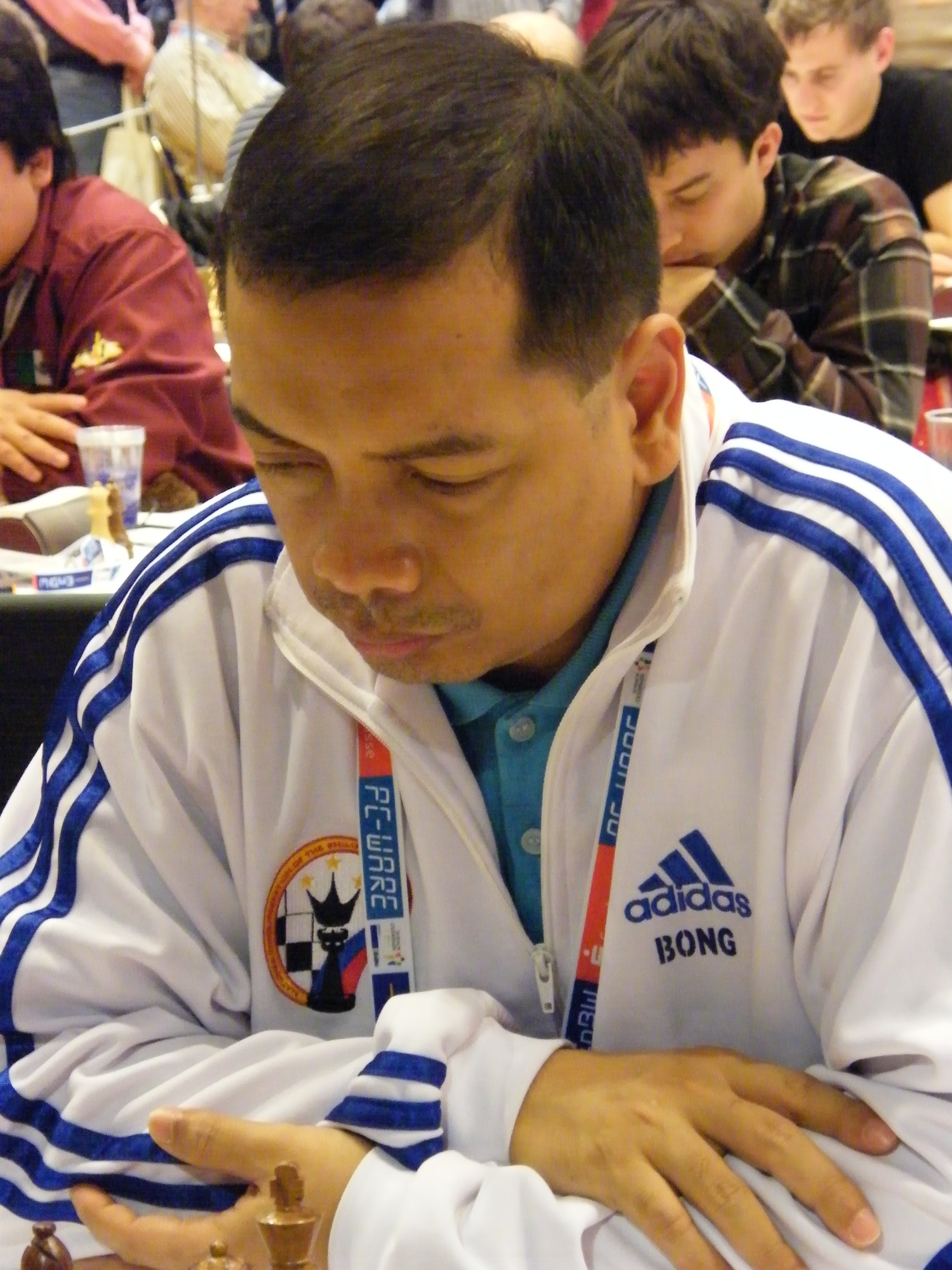
- Villamayor at 2008 Chess Olympiad, Dresden

Personal information
- Born: Buenaventura Mendieta Villamayor; May 4, 1967 (age 59) Mauban, Quezon, Philippines

Chess career
- Country: Philippines (until 2017); Singapore (since 2017)
- Title: Grandmaster (2000)
- Peak rating: 2560 (January 2001)

Buenaventura "Bong" Mendieta Villamayor (born May 4, 1967) is a Filipino chess player. He was awarded the title of Grandmaster by FIDE in 2000, becoming the fourth from the Philippines to achieve this feat.

Villamayor won the national championship of the Philippines in 1998. He competed in the FIDE World Chess Championship 2000 in New Delhi, India. In 2017, Villamayor transferred his national federation to represent Singapore.

== Chess Olympiad and Asian Team Chess Championship ==
Bong Villamayor was a five-time participant in the Chess Olympiad:

- 31st Chess Olympiad (Moscow 1994) where he played the 2nd Reserve Board and contributed 2.0/4.0 posting 1 win, 2 draws and 1 loss with a Performance Rating (PR) of 2428 which was higher than his ELO at that time of 2260. The team registered a 21st place finish;
- 33rd Chess Olympiad (Elista 1998) where he manned Board 4 playing 12 games (3 wins, 7 draws, 2 losses), scoring 6.5/12.0 and posted a PR of 2514 compared to his ELO of 2280, gaining more than a 100 ELO rating points. This team placed 35th in this Olympiad;
- 34th Chess Olympiad (Istanbul 2000) where he manned Board 3 where he posted 7.0/12 games registering 4 wins, 6 draws, 2 losses with a PR of 2550 just a shade higher than his ELO of 2548 in that tournament. Team Philippines performed rather well as they finished in 19th place;
- 35th Chess Olympiad (Bled 2002) manning Board 3 once again but had a rather poor showing of 5.0/11 games where he posted 3 wins, 4 draws and 4 losses with a low PR of 2377 as compared to his ELO of 2503 at that time. The team ended up in 39th place;
- 38th Chess Olympiad (Dresden 2008) where he was assigned to Board 1 despite the fact that he was the lowest-ranked player of Team Philippines based on ELO (2468) as compared to the other team members: GM Wesley So who played Board 2 was the top player with an ELO of 2610; GM John Paul Gomez was the second-highest ranked player with an ELO of 2519 but was assigned to Board 4; GM Darwin Laylo was the third-highest ranked with an ELO of 2507 but was relegated to the 1st Reserve Board; and GM Jayson Gonzales who played Board 3 with a slightly better ELO of 2469 than Villamayor. The move backfired for Team Philippines as GM Villamayor played poorly scoring only 2.0/8 games without winning even a single game only posting 4 draws against the same number of losses for a very poor PR of 2361 and he turned out to be the team's lowest scorer in the said Olympiad. So posted 7.0/10, Gomez 7.5/11, Gonzales 3.5/7 and Laylo 3.5/8. The team ended up in 46th place.

Villamayor also played at the 12th Asian Chess Championship held at Shenyang, China in 1999 where Team Philippines placed 4th but he won the Gold Medal in Board 2 where he posted 6.5/9 on the strength of 5 wins, 3 draws and 1 loss for a very high PR of 2602 as compared to his ELO then of 2447.

== Notable Results in Tournaments and Team Events ==
- 2015 Singapore National Rapid Championship 1st Place
- 2014 Penang International Open Championship 1st Place
- 2010 Singapore Open 2nd Place
- 2008 Subic International Open 1st Place
- 2008 Philippine International Open 2nd Place
- 2004 Asian Cities Team Championships 1st Place and Gold Medal
- 2003 Vietnam SouthEast Asian (SEA) Games Double Gold Medalist
- 2003 Shell National Rapid Champion
- 2000 FIDE World Championship Candidate in New Delhi, India
- 2000 Istanbul, Turkey Chess Olympiad
- 2000 Equitable Card Grandmasters Classic 2nd Place Finish (Third GM norm)
- 2000 Vietnam Grandmaster Circuit II 1st Place Finish (Second GM norm)
- 2000 Vietnam Grandmaster Circuit I 1st Place Finish (First GM norm)
- 2000 Vietnam Asian Zonals Championships 1st Place Finish (Qualified for World Championships)
- 2000 Bali Grandmaster Open, Indonesia 1st Place Finish
- 1996 Abu Dhabi International Open 1st Place
- 1989 Manila Mayor’s Cup National Open 1st Place
- 1986 World Junior Championship, Norway World Blitz Champion
