= Igor-Alexandre Nataf =

French chess grandmaster (born 1978)

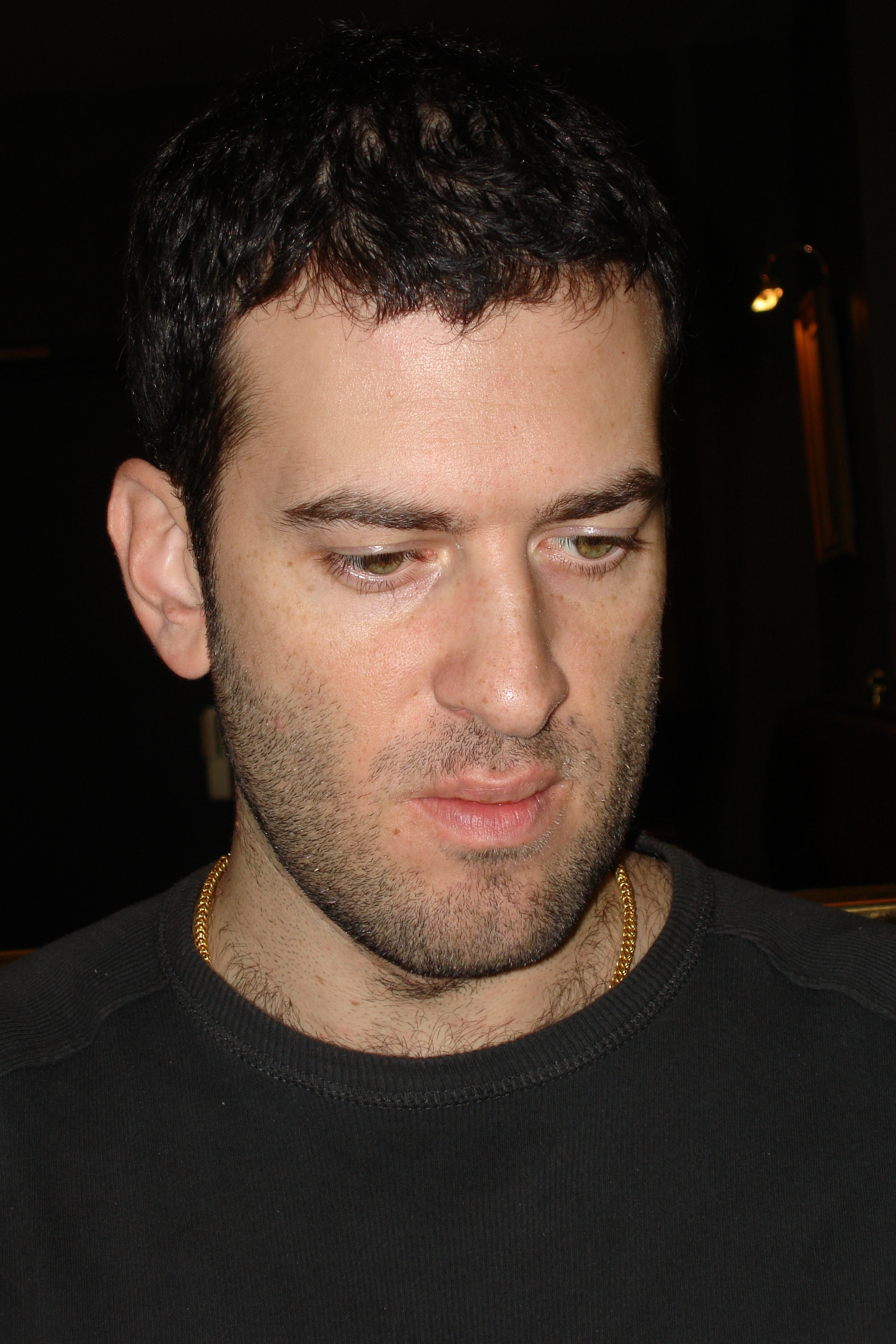
- Nataf in 2008

Personal information
- Born: 2 May 1978 (age 48) Paris, France

Chess career
- Country: France
- Title: Grandmaster (1998), Senior International Correspondence Chess Master (2017)
- FIDE rating: 2506 (October 2026)
- Peak rating: 2596 (April 2007)
- Peak ranking: No. 161 (July 2006)

Igor-Alexandre Nataf (born 2 May 1978) is a French chess grandmaster. He received the FIDE title of Grandmaster in 1998.

== Chess career ==
Nataf represented France at the European Team Chess Championship in 1999 and at Olympiads in 2000 and 2004. In the 2000 FIDE World Championship, he beat Emil Sutovsky and Nigel Short before losing to the Brazilian grandmaster Rafael Leitão in round 3. He was less successful in the 2001–02 World Championship, beating Viktor Bologan in round 1 but losing to Konstantin Sakaev in round 2.

== Notable games ==
Nataf's win against John Nunn at the 1999 French Team championship was voted best game in Chess Informant 76 in 1999.

Nunn vs. Nataf, 1999

Position: h1 white rook, e1 white king, d1 white queen, a1 white rook, h2 white pawn, f2 white pawn, e2 white bishop, b2 white pawn, a2 white pawn, g3 white bishop, c3 white knight, a3 white knight, g4 black knight, e4 white pawn, c4 white pawn, d6 black pawn, c6 black knight, a6 black pawn, h7 black pawn, g7 black pawn, e7 black bishop, b7 black pawn, g8 black king, f8 black rook, d8 black queen, c8 black bishop, a8 black rook

Position after 14.Be2

Sicilian Defence, Kalashnikov Variation (ECO B32)
1.e4 c5 2.Nf3 Nc6 3.d4 cxd4 4.Nxd4 e5 5.Nb5 d6 6.c4 Be7 7.N1c3 a6 8.Na3 f5 9.Bd3 f4 10.g3 Nf6 11.gxf4 exf4 12.Bxf4 0-0 13.Bg3 Ng4 14.Be2 (diagram) Nxf2!! 15.Qd5+ Kh8 16.Bxf2 Nb4 17.Qh5 Rxf2 18.Kxf2 Bh4+ 19.Kg2 g6 20.Qf3 Qg5+ 21.Kf1 Bh3+ 22.Qxh3 Rf8+ 23.Bf3 Qe3 24.Qxh4 Nd3 25.Nd5 Qxf3+ 26.Kg1 Nf2 27.Kf1 Qxh1+ 28.Ke2 Qxa1 0–1
