= Aleksandr Galkin (chess player) =

Russian chess grandmaster (born 1979)

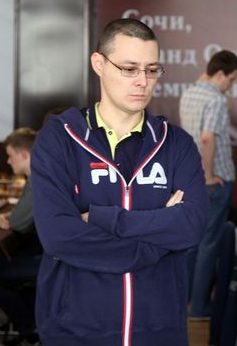

Personal information
- Born: 1 February 1979 (age 47) Rostov-on-Don, Soviet Union

Chess career
- Country: Russia
- Title: Grandmaster (1997)
- FIDE rating: 2611 (July 2026)
- Peak rating: 2626 (August 2012)
- Peak ranking: No. 96 (April 2006)

Aleksandr Aleksandrovich Galkin (Russian: Александр Александрович Галкин; born 1 February 1979) is a Russian chess player. Born in Rostov-on-Don, he was awarded the title Grandmaster by FIDE in 1997.

== Chess career ==
Galkin won the 1999 World Junior Chess Championship. This victory qualified him for the FIDE World Chess Championship 2000. Here he defeated Aleksandar Wohl in the first round and then lost to Alexander Beliavsky in the second, thus exiting the competition. Galkin competed in the FIDE World Championship again in 2004; this time he was eliminated in the first round by Aleksander Delchev. Three year later, Galkin participated in the FIDE World Cup; here he defeated Mateusz Bartel in round one and lost to Vassily Ivanchuk in round two. In 2011, Galkin played in the Russian Championship Superfinal.
