= Paweł Blehm =

Polish chess player

Personal information
- Born: 17 April 1980 (age 46) Olkusz, Poland

Chess career
- Country: Poland
- Title: Grandmaster (2001)
- FIDE rating: 2505 (July 2026)
- Peak rating: 2546 (April 2002)

Paweł Blehm (born 17 April 1980 in Olkusz) is a Polish chess grandmaster (2001).

He took part in the FIDE World Chess Championship 2000, but was knocked out in the first round by Smbat Lputian. He played for Poland in the Chess Olympiad of 2000. In 2002 he won the Bermuda Open tournament.

His handle on the Internet Chess Club is "Pawelek".
