= Anatoly Ufimtsev (chess player) =

Kazakhstani economist and chess player (1914–2000)

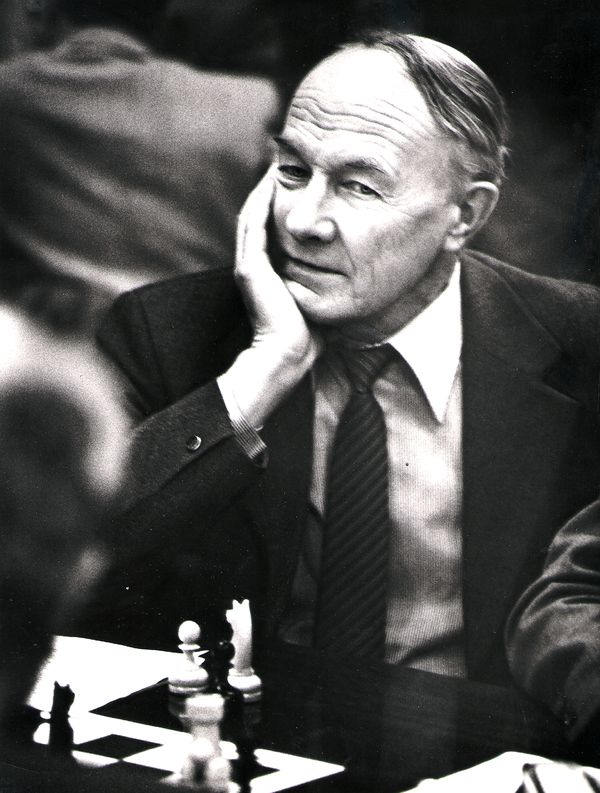

Personal information
- Native name: Анатолій Гаврилович Умфіцев
- Born: May 11, 1914 Omsk, Russian Empire
- Died: July 2, 2000 (aged 86) Kostanay, Kazakhstan

Anatoly Gavrilovich Ufimtsev (Russian: Анатолий Гаврилович Уфимцев; May 11, 1914 – July 2, 2000) was a Soviet and Kazakh chess player and economist. The Ufimtsev Defense is named after him. He holds the record for the most Kazakhstani Chess Championship wins with eleven.

His father was Gavriil Ufimtsev.

He was awarded the title of Master of Sport from the USSR in 1946. He qualified once for the USSR Championship in 1947. He eventually shared 13th to 15th place, but achieved victories over Vasily Smyslov and Salo Flohr.

Ufimtsev won the Kazakhstani Chess Championship in 1947, 1948, 1949, 1950, 1951, 1952, 1953, 1954 (shared with Kurkleitis), 1955, 1957, and 1970.

On November 10, 2000 a chess club in his honor was opened in Kostany, Kazakhstan. At the entrance of the club there is a plaque depicting Ufimtsev at a chessboard.
