= Sergei Shipov =

Russian chess grandmaster (born 1966)

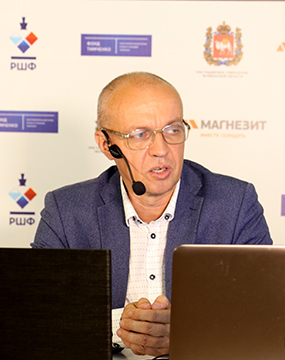

Personal information
- Born: 17 April 1966 (age 60) Murom, Russian SFSR, Soviet Union

Chess career
- Country: Russia
- Title: Grandmaster (1996)
- FIDE rating: 2541 (July 2026)
- Peak rating: 2662 (January 1999)
- Peak ranking: No. 24 (January 1999)

Sergei Shipov (born 17 April 1966) is a Russian chess player, trainer, journalist and writer. He was awarded the title Grandmaster by FIDE in 1996.

== Career ==
Shipov founded the chess website Crestbook where, among other services, he provides online commentary to current chess events in Russian. One of the most popular areas of the site is "Ask Shipov" where Shipov answers questions on chess-related topics.

Shipov is also a chess trainer and a chess writer. Among other players, he worked with Alexandra Kosteniuk, Ian Nepomniachtchi, Daniil Dubov, Grigoriy Oparin, and Andrey Esipenko. Shipov wrote a book about a system for black in Sicilian Defence, "The Complete Hedgehog". He is also a strong blitz chess player with a rating around 2700 on the chess.com website. Shipov has a YouTube channel where he publishes videos with chess analysis.

In 2006, Shipov won the Midnight Sun Chess Challenge in Tromsø, Norway, with a score of 7½/9, a half point ahead of Magnus Carlsen.

== Controversy ==
In February 2022, FIDE referred Shipov to an internal disciplinary commission for supporting the 2022 Russian invasion of Ukraine, but the commission acquitted him in March. In March 2023 Shipov reported that Chess.com has blocked his account.

== Books ==
- Дамский Я., Шипов С. Последняя интрига века. Каспаров-Крамник. Лондон 2000, Москва 2000, ISBN 5-93815-008-6 (in Russian)
- Шипов С., Еж. Хищники на шахматной доске, Москва 2004, ISBN 5-7905-2763-9 (in Russian)
- Shipov, Sergey (2010). The Complete Hedgehog, Vol. 1. Mongoose Press. ISBN 978-0-9791482-1-7.
- Shipov, Sergey (2011). The Complete Hedgehog, Vol. 2. Mongoose Press. ISBN 978-1-9362772-2-3.
