= Mikhail Mukhin =

Russian chess player

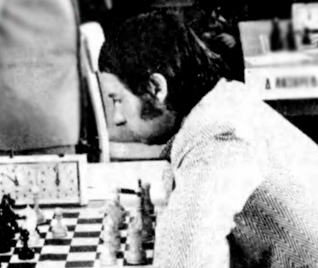
- Mukhin in 1976

Personal information
- Born: Mikhail Alexandrovich Mukhin; 19 February 1948 Almaty, Kazakh SSR, Soviet Union
- Died: 4 May 1977 (aged 29) Almaty, Kazakh SSR, Soviet Union

Chess career
- Country: Soviet Union
- Title: International Master (1975)

Mikhail Alexandrovich Mukhin (Russian: Михаил Александрович Мухин; 19 February 1948 – 4 May 1977) was a Soviet-Kazakh chess master. His best career's result was a shared 3rd place in the 1972 USSR Chess Championship.

== Biography and chess career ==
His father was a mining engineer, for many years he was the chief specialist in non-ferrous metals in Kazakhstan. When Mukhin was six years old, his mother taught the boy how to play chess. As a child, his family moved from city to city several times, and for the first time he entered a chess club in Kemerovo in 1958.

Mukhin played the team championship of Kazakhstan (1963), where he became a candidate for master. The young talent progressed rapidly and in 1965 won the Youth USSR Championship.

He graduated from Institute of Physical Education in Moscow.

Having successfully played in the Moscow championship (1970) and the USSR semifinals, Mukhin fulfilled the USSR master of sports title.

At the 1972 USSR Chess Championship, held at Baku, Mukhin shared the 3-5th place with Vladimir Savon and Gennady Kuzmin (with Mikhail Tal and Vladimir Tukmakov taking first and second place).

At the super-tournament in Sukhumi (1972) Mukhin finished fourth, defeating Alexander Belyavsky, Robert Hubner and other strong chess masters. He received the title of International Master after finishing third in Děčín international tournament (1974). As part of the USSR youth team, he participated in the triple match-tournament of the country's teams - he lost 0.5-1.5 to Efim Geller and tied 1-1 with Ratmir Kholmov.

In 1976, he successfully played in the championships of Kazakhstan and in the semifinals of the USSR Championship, but could no longer play at full strength because he suffered from a incurable illness that soon took his life. In the last years, Mukhin worked as a coach.

He died of a brain aneurysm on May 4, 1977.
