= Bartłomiej Macieja =

Polish chess grandmaster (born 1977)

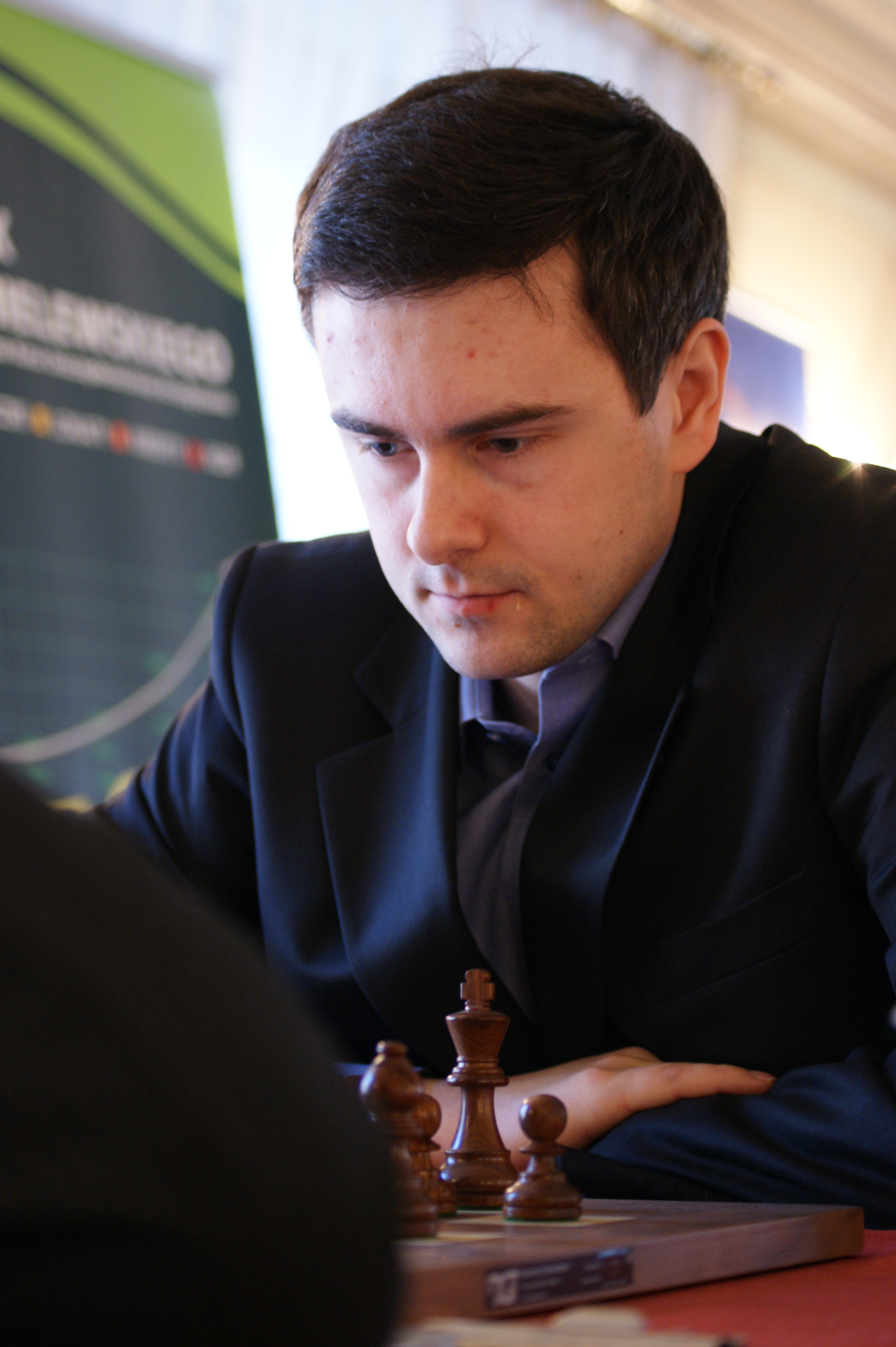
- Bartłomiej Macieja, Lublin 2010

Personal information
- Born: 4 October 1977 (age 48) Warsaw, Poland
- Spouse: Alejandra Guerrero Rodríguez (m. 2012)

Chess career
- Country: Poland
- Title: Grandmaster (1998)
- FIDE rating: 2512 (July 2026)
- Peak rating: 2653 (January 2004)
- Peak ranking: No. 40 (January 2004)

Bartłomiej "Bartek" Macieja (born 4 October 1977) is a Polish chess player who holds the FIDE title of Grandmaster (GM).

He is married to Mexican chess master Alejandra Guerrero Rodríguez.

He currently serves as the head chess coach for the University of Texas Rio Grande Valley.

== Career ==
Born in Warsaw, he was the Polish Under-18 champion in 1994, and the Polish national champion in 2004 and 2009.

Macieja played his first international tournament at Bydgoszcz in 1985. In 1995, he won in Zlín and in 1996, finished first in Budapest. He tied for 1st-4th places with Liviu-Dieter Nisipeanu, Vlastimil Babula and Zoltán Almási at the Krynica 1998 (zonal tournament). A four-time qualifier for the FIDE World Championship finals (Las Vegas 1999, New Delhi 2000, Moscow 2001 and Tripoli 2004), at Delhi he beat Jonathan Speelman, Michał Krasenkow, and Alexander Beliavsky but lost in 4th round to Viswanathan Anand.

Macieja won the European Championship at Batumi 2002 and tied for 2nd-3rd with Viktor Korchnoi, behind Alexei Shirov, at Reykjavík 2003. He was 5-times European Team Vice-Champion (1997, 1999, 2001, 2003, 2005).

In 2003, Macieja played an 8 games match against former world champion Karpov which he lost 6–2.

He played for Poland in six Chess Olympiads.

- In 1998, at third board in 33rd Chess Olympiad in Elista (+3−1=6);
- In 2000, at third board in 34th Chess Olympiad in Istanbul (+3−1=6);
- In 2002, at second board in 35th Chess Olympiad in Bled (+1−0=10);
- In 2004, at first board in 36th Chess Olympiad in Calvià (+4−3=5);
- In 2006, at second board in 37th Chess Olympiad in Turin (+1−2=5);
- In 2012, at fifth board in 40th Chess Olympiad in Istanbul (+5−1=3).

Awarded the International Master title in 1996, and the Grandmaster title in 1999.

He played at Alzicapital's team in Spain, national champion in 2010.

In 2014, Macieja won the U.S. Masters Chess Championship, and tied for first place in 2019.

In opening theory, Macieja has made contributions to the Classical Variation of the Nimzo Indian Defense. After 1.d4 Nf6 2.c4 e6 3.Nc3 Bb4 4.Qc2 c5 5.dxc5 0-0 6.a3 Bxc5 7.Nf3, Macieja popularized 7...b6. David Vigorito has called this line the "Macieja Variation" and considers it Black's best try in the 4...c5 defense against 4.Qc2.
