= Matthias Wahls =

German chess grandmaster (born 1968)

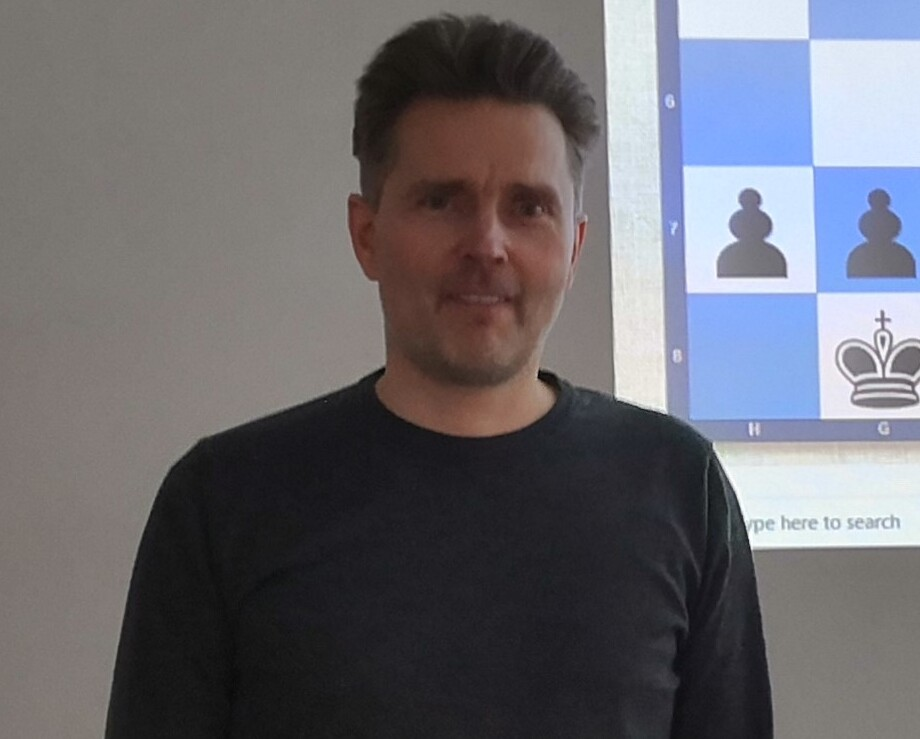
- Matthias Wahls during a workshop in 2020

Personal information
- Born: January 25, 1968 (age 58) Hamburg, Germany

Chess career
- Country: Germany
- Title: Grandmaster (1989)
- FIDE rating: 2516 (July 2026)
- Peak rating: 2609 (January 1999)
- Peak ranking: No. 49 (January 1990)

Matthias Wahls (born January 25, 1968) is a German chess grandmaster and chess instructor.

== Career ==
Wahls began his career through SK Union Eimsbuettel, a chess club in Hamburg. Beginning in 1985, he played for Hamburger SK in the first division, and became the German Youth Chess Champion. Wahls was recognized by FIDE as an International Master in 1988 and achieved the title of Grandmaster in 1989.

Wahls represented Germany in the 1990 and 1992 Chess Olympiads and went on to win the 1996 and 1997 German Chess Championships. In 1998, Wahls qualified for the FIDE World Chess Championship held a year later in Las Vegas. He defeated Altin Cela of Albania by 1½ – ½ but was defeated in the second round by Ukrainian Vassily Ivanchuk scoring 0 – 2.

In the latter 1990s, Wahls began conducting seminars, focusing primarily on openings. He also published a book titled "The Modern Scandinavian: Themes, Structures & Plans in an Increasingly Popular Chess Opening" in 1997 and created a course on the Scandinavian Defense opening.

Wahls' score In the Elo system of rating relative skill remained unchanged from July of 2006 through October, 2022, as he played no Elo-eligible matches. He has since dropped to 2533.
