= Tal Shaked =

American chess grandmaster (born 1978)

Personal information
- Born: February 5, 1978 (age 48) Albuquerque, New Mexico, U.S.

Chess career
- Country: United States
- Title: Grandmaster (1997)
- FIDE rating: 2468 (July 2026)
- Peak rating: 2535 (January 1998)

Tal Shaked (born February 5, 1978) is an American chess grandmaster who is best known for winning the World Junior Championship in 1997.

== Chess career ==
Shaked learned the game at the age of seven, and developed his chess skills in the scholastic chess organizations of Tucson, Arizona. As a junior, Shaked won several national scholastic championships, including the 1987 National Primary Championship, the 1990 National Elementary Championship, the 1991 National K-8 Championship, the 1992 National K-8 Championship, the 1992 U.S. Cadet (under 16) Championship, and the 1995 U.S. Junior (under 20) Championship; he also won the 1995 National Open. Shaked won the Laura Aspis Prize in 1991 as the number-one rated American chess player under the age of 13, and that same year became the youngest ever winner of the Arizona State Championship.

Shaked's victory at the 1995 US Junior Championship granted him a place in the 1996 U.S. Chess Championship. Although he was by far the youngest and lowest-rated player in the field, he surprised many by his performance, leading the tournament after eight rounds. Later in 1996, Shaked received the Frank Samford fellowship, which allowed him the monetary resources to fully devote his time to chess. Making the most of the opportunity, Shaked obtained three grandmaster norms within five months, officially attaining the title of grandmaster; it would be ten years later until another American-born player would achieve the grandmaster title. Two months after his third norm, Shaked won the 1997 World Junior Championship, defeating top-seed and future super-grandmaster Alexander Morozevich and scoring a total of six wins and seven draws to beat out Morozevich, future FIDE world chess champion Ruslan Ponomariov and others.

As winner of the World Junior Championship, Shaked was invited to play in the super-grandmaster event in Tillburg, Holland, a field which included world champion Garry Kasparov, future world champion Vladimir Kramnik, and super-grandmasters Peter Svidler, Peter Leko, Alexei Shirov, Judit Polgár and Michael Adams. In late 1997, Shaked competed in the FIDE World Chess Championship, winning his first round match before losing in the second round. In 1998, Shaked advanced to the semifinals of the United States Championship, defeating grandmaster Boris Gulko before losing to eventual champion Nick de Firmian. Having entered college at the University of Maryland, Baltimore County on a full chess scholarship in 1998, he helped lead UMBC to the 1998 Pan-American Intercollegiate Championship as his team's top-rated player. He eventually transferred to the University of Arizona where he graduated with a degree in computer science in 2002.

== Post-chess career ==
Tal Shaked eventually gave up competitive chess, though he remained active with blitz chess on the internet. His last serious competition was the FIDE World Chess Championship 1999, and he had already decided to leave chess prior to that tournament due to motivation and the economic uncertainty in being a professional chess player.

Shaked received his master's degree in computer science from the University of Washington in 2004 and joined Google as a Software Engineer on 4 October 2004. On 9 March 2019 he left Google in order to lead Machine Learning and AI at Lyft. On 7 October 2019, he went back to work for Google, as Distinguished Engineer (Senior Director).
