= Petr Kostenko =

Kazakhstani chess grandmaster (born 1976)

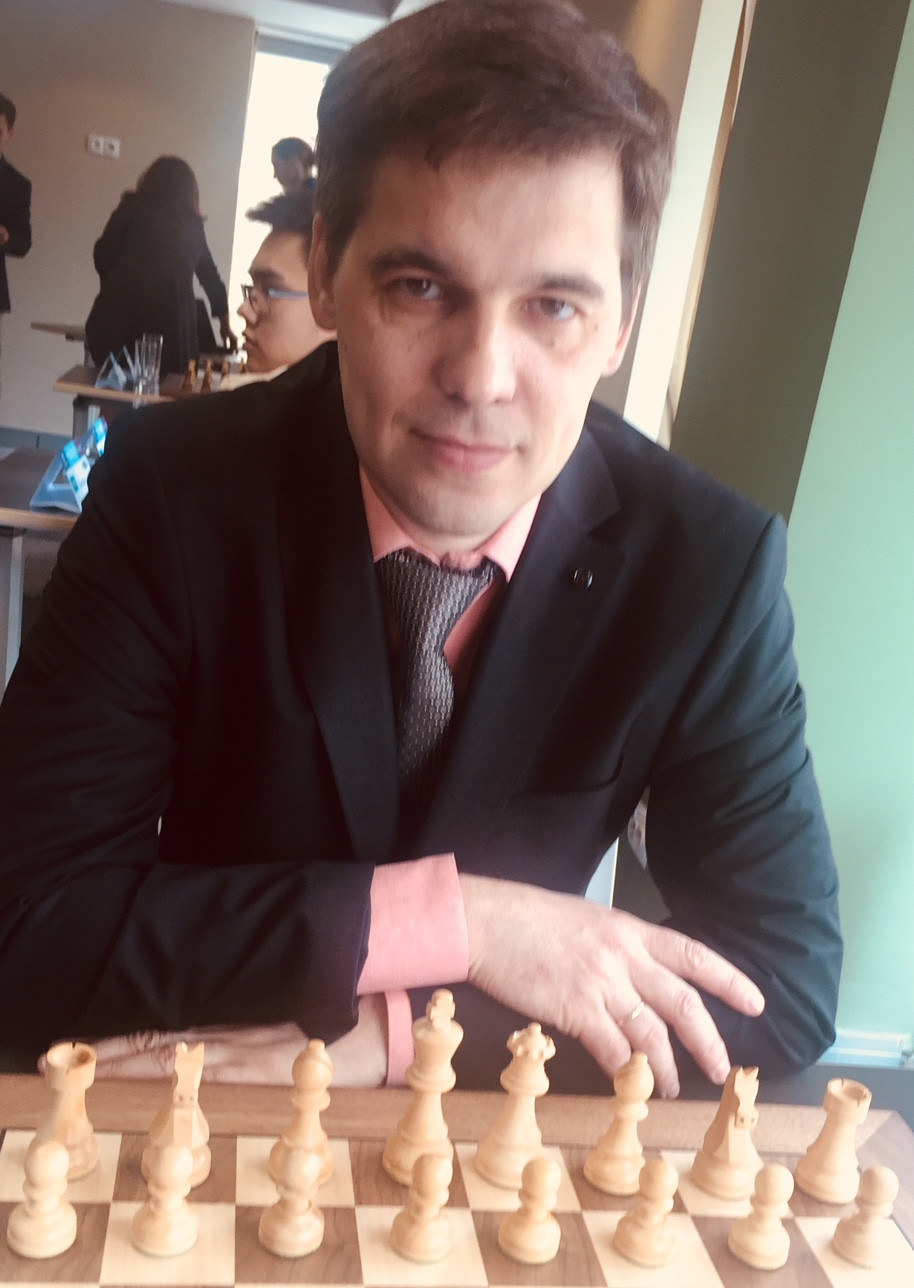

Personal information
- Born: February 16, 1976 (age 50) Kostanay, Kazakh SSR, Soviet Union

Chess career
- Country: Kazakhstan
- Title: Grandmaster (2006)
- Peak rating: 2531 (April 2007)

Petr Yevgenyevich Kostenko (also Pyotr; Russian: Пётр Евгеньевич Костенко; born February 16, 1976) is a Kazakhstani chess Grandmaster from Kostanay.

== Personal life ==
Kostenko has a son who has achieved third category in chess. He also has a daughter who was born in May 2020.

== Chess career ==
Kostenko is a four-time Kazakhstan national champion in classical chess.

In 2004, he left chess. He returned two years later, becoming an active player again and earning the Grandmaster title.

He competed in the 2014 Asian Chess Championship in Al-Ain. One of his games at the tournament was against S. P. Sethuraman, which ended in a loss.

At the Dubai Open Chess Tournament in 2016, Kostenko played a game against Sandipan Chanda that lasted 5 hours and 142 moves--the longest game of the tournament. The two ended their game in a draw.

In January 2020, Kostenko played in a round-robin tournament in Chelyabinsk as "training." However, due to the COVID-19 Lockdown, that would be his only over-the-board chess event that year. He would compete in online chess tournaments, even winning the temporarily-online annual Akim Cup that same year.

In May 2021, he competed in the Zone 3.4 Open Championship. He placed 3rd out of 10 with 6½ points.

In December 2022, Kostenko placed 9th out of 14 in the Kazakhstan Chess Championship with 5½ points.
