= Jordi Magem Badals =

Spanish chess grandmaster (born 1967)

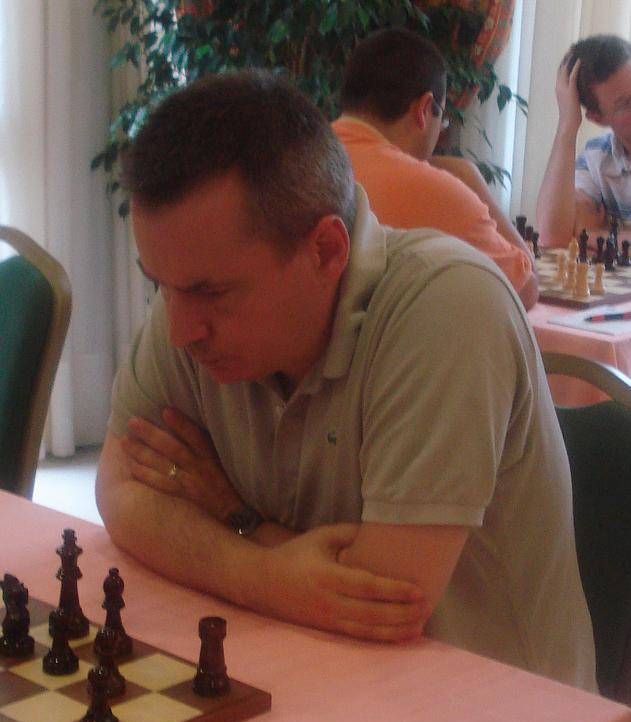
- Jordi Magem Badals at the 2008 Andorra Open.

Personal information
- Born: August 24, 1967 (age 58) Barcelona, Spain

Chess career
- Country: Spain
- Title: Grandmaster (1994)
- FIDE rating: 2474 (July 2026)
- Peak rating: 2593 (November 2010)

Jordi Magem Badals (born August 24, 1967 in Barcelona) is a Spanish chess Grandmaster.

== Chess career ==
In 1981 Magem Badals won the Catalan Junior Chess Championship. In 1983, he won the Catalan and Spanish youth chess championships.

Magem Badals won the Spanish Chess Championship in 1990, ahead of IM Marcelino Sion Castro. He has been runner-up on three other occasions, in 1986 behind Ángel Martín González, in 1993 behind Lluis Comas Fabregó and in 1997 behind Pablo San Segundo Carrillo. He has won the Catalan Chess Championship twice, in 2008 and 2010, and was runner-up in 2009.

Magem Badals played in the FIDE World Chess Championship 1999 knockout matches in Las Vegas, United States, but was eliminated in round 3 by Judit Polgár.

Magem Badals represented Spain in seven Chess Olympiads in Novi Sad 1990, Moscow 1994, Yerevan 1996, Elista 1998, Istanbul 2000, Bled 2002 and Khanty-Mansiysk 2010. His best result was in the 39th Chess Olympiad in Khanty-Mansiysk 2010 where he scored 6/9 and finished 7th on board 4. He also represented Spain in the European Team Chess Championship three times, in Debrecen 1992, Pula 1997 and Batumi 1999.
