= Liviu-Dieter Nisipeanu =

Romanian chess grandmaster (born 1976)

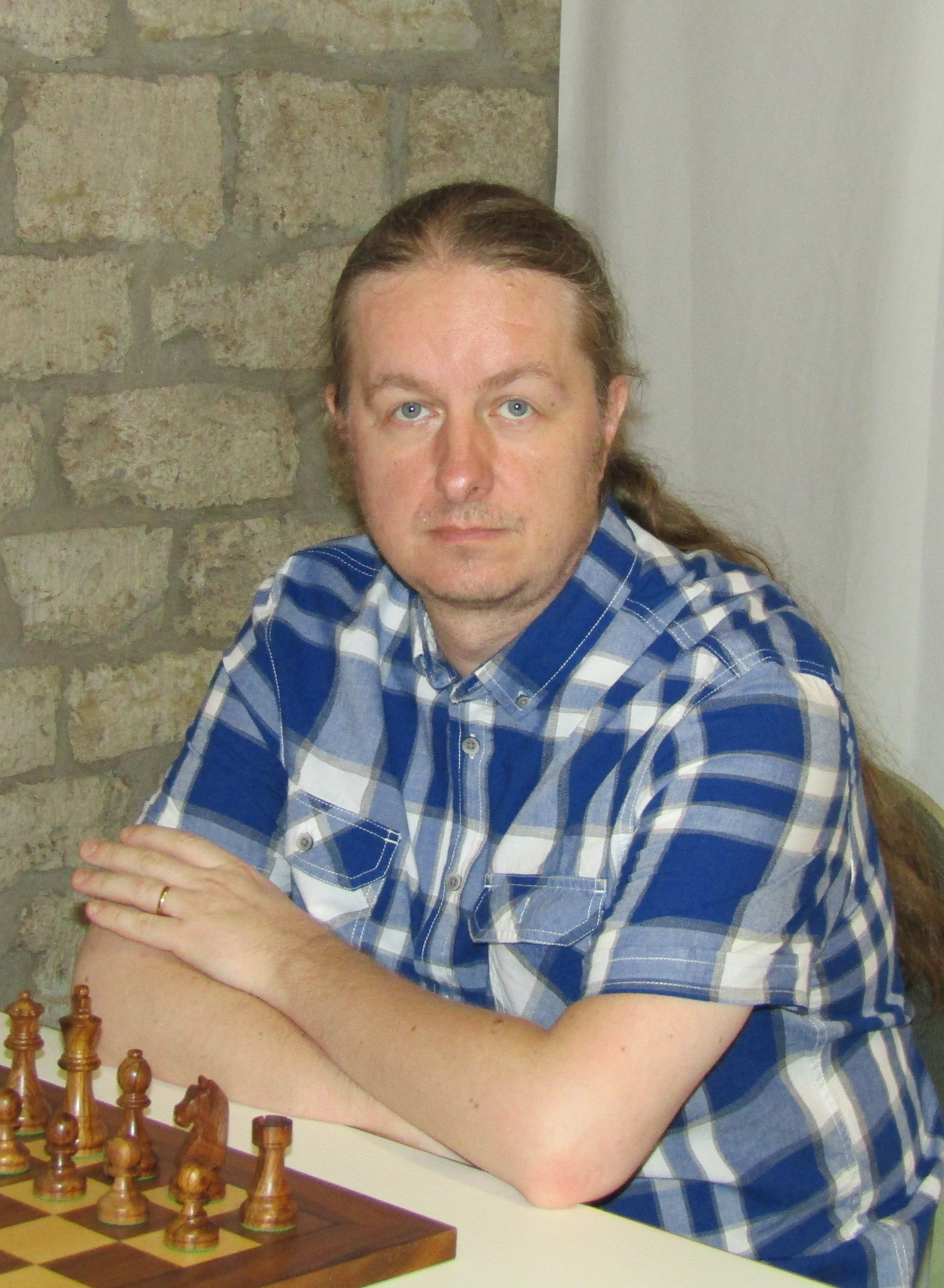
- Nisipeanu in 2017

Personal information
- Born: 1 August 1976 (age 49) Braşov, Romania

Chess career
- Country: Romania (until 2014; since 2023); Germany (2014–2023)
- Title: Grandmaster (1997)
- FIDE rating: 2582 (July 2026)
- Peak rating: 2707 (October 2005)
- Peak ranking: No. 15 (October 2005)

Liviu-Dieter Nisipeanu (born 1 August 1976) is a Romanian chess grandmaster. His peak FIDE rating was 2707 in October 2005, when he was ranked fifteenth in the world, and the highest rated Romanian player ever. It was only in September 2022 that his rating was surpassed by grandmaster Bogdan-Daniel Deac.

== Style ==
His highly aggressive style of play has earned him a reputation of a modern-day Mikhail Tal.

== Career ==
In 1999, Nisipeanu as a clear outsider made it to the semifinals of the FIDE World Chess Championship by beating Vasily Ivanchuk in round 4 and Alexei Shirov in the quarterfinals only to succumb to the eventual champion Alexander Khalifman.

Nisipeanu won the European Individual Chess Championship 2005 in Warsaw with 10 points out of 13 games, half a point ahead of runner-up Teimour Radjabov from Azerbaijan.

In April 2006, Nisipeanu played FIDE World Champion Veselin Topalov in a four-game match. Topalov won by a score of 3:1. The match was not for any official title.

In April 2014, Nisipeanu started playing under the German flag. In 2017 he won the German Chess Championship in Apolda for the first time.

In 2022, Nisipeanu won the Targu Mures Open, with a score of 7/9

In April 2023, Nisipeanu returned to playing under the Romanian flag.

== Notable chess games ==
- Liviu Dieter Nisipeanu vs Vlastimil Babula, 6th EU Ind. Ch. 2005, Sicilian Defense: Scheveningen Variation (B82), 1-0
- Liviu Dieter Nisipeanu vs Viktor Bologan, TCh-FRA Top 16 2006, Sicilian Defense: Najdorf Variation (B90), 1-0
- Veselin Topalov vs Liviu Dieter Nisipeanu, Mtel Masters 2007, Scandinavian Defense: Gubinsky-Melts Defense (B01), 0-1
- Vassily Ivanchuk vs Liviu Dieter Nisipeanu, World Chess Cup 2007, Bogo-Indian Defense: Grunfeld Variation (E11), 0-1
- Liviu Dieter Nisipeanu vs Hikaru Nakamura, World Chess Cup 2019, Queen's Gambit Declined: Three Knights Variation. General (D37) 1-0
