= 1994 in chess =

Below is a list of events in chess in 1994, as well as the top ten FIDE rated chess players of that year.

== Top players ==
FIDE top 10 by Elo rating – January 1994

1. Garry Kasparov Russia 2815
2. Anatoly Karpov Russia 2740
3. Alexei Shirov Latvia 2715
4. Viswanathan Anand India 2715
5. Vassily Ivanchuk Ukraine 2710
6. Vladimir Kramnik Russia 2710
7. Gata Kamsky United States 2695
8. Valery Salov Russia 2685
9. Evgeny Bareev Russia 2685
10. Boris Gelfand Belarus 2685

== Chess news in brief ==
- The PCA and sponsor Intel team up for a series of knockout 'Grand Prix' events. These rapidplay events are considered more media and spectator friendly than chess played at regular time limits. The prizes are generous and the world's elite players turn out in force. Viswanathan Anand wins the Moscow Grand Prix, Vladimir Kramnik the New York City event and Vassily Ivanchuk is a winner in London. Garry Kasparov, after coming close at New York, wins the Paris edition. Intel's new Pentium processor is used to run the Chess Genius program at the London event and the computer defeats Kasparov, but fares less well against Anand.
- The semi-final stage of the PCA World Chess Championship produces two finalists in Anand and Gata Kamsky, when they defeat Michael Adams and Nigel Short respectively.
- In FIDE's equivalent contest, the (Wijk aan Zee) Candidates' quarter-final winners are Anand (over Artur Yusupov), Kamsky (over Paul van der Sterren), Kramnik (over Leonid Yudasin), Jan Timman (over Joël Lautier), Valery Salov (over Alexander Khalifman) and Boris Gelfand (over Adams). Subsequently, in the (Sanghi Nagar) semi-finals, Gelfand eliminates Kramnik, Kamsky eliminates Anand and Salov eliminates Timman. All three join Anatoly Karpov in the final stages.
- The Chess Olympiad is switched to Moscow, after problems are encountered with the planned venue of Thessaloniki. First place goes to Russia (37½/56), ahead of Bosnia & Herzegovina (35), Russia II and England (both 34½). 124 teams take part. Georgia wins the Women's event (32/42), ahead of Hungary (31), China and Romania (both 27). Yuri Averbakh is the Chief Arbiter for both events.
- Karpov wins at Linares. An immensely strong entry results in FIDE's first ever Category 18 classification.
- Kasparov and Ivanchuk share success at the double round Novgorod tournament with 7/10 ahead of Kramnik (5).
- Kasparov wins the Amsterdam double rounder with 4/6.
- Kamsky is the winner at Las Palmas with 6½/9, ahead of Karpov (6).
- The Horgen tournament is a runaway success for Kasparov with 8½/11.
- Jeroen Piket wins at the Dortmund Sparkassen Tournament with 6½/9, ahead of Adams (5½).
- Munich is a triumph for Ivanchuk with 7½/11.
- Gelfand is the victor at Dos Hermanas with 6½/9, ahead of Karpov on 6.
- Judit Polgár wins at Madrid with 7/9.
- Salov is the winner of a knockout event in Tilburg.
- Alexander Morozevich wins the final Lloyds Bank, London event with an almost perfect 9½/10.
- John Nunn wins the 1993/94 Hastings International Chess Congress.
- A double Estonian success occurs at the 12th New York City Open when Lembit Oll and Jaan Ehlvest share victory.
- The Armenian GM Artashes Minasian wins the World Open.
- Icelander Helgi Grétarsson wins the World Junior Chess Championship in Brazil, and becomes a chess grandmaster as a result.
- The World Youth Chess Championships are held in Szeged, Hungary. A stronger than average entry reveals many exceptional talents, including winners Peter Svidler (Under 18), Peter Leko (Under 16), Levon Aronian (Under 12) and Natalia Zhukova (Under 16 girls). Svidler crowns a special year by also winning the Russian Chess Championship.
- Boris Gulko wins the U.S. Chess Championship in Key West, Florida. He takes home an $8,000 prize for first place.
- Mark Taimanov wins the 4th World Senior Championship at Biel.
- Georgi Orlov wins the 95th U.S. Open Chess Championship in Chicago.
- Josh Waitzkin wins the U.S. Junior Championship in Bloomington.
- Joel Benjamin wins the 5th Harvard Cup, but the computer program Wchess outperforms the Grandmasters.
- Peter Leko becomes a Grandmaster at 14 years, 4 months, 22 days.
- Valery Salov wins a 'double round' themed tournament in Buenos Aires. Themed tournaments at the top level are nowadays rare; in this one, every game commences with an Open Sicilian.
- Alexei Shirov is married for the first time (to the Argentinian, Veronica Alvarez) and moves to Tarragona, Spain, where he settles and takes citizenship.

== Births ==
- Hou Yifan, World Girls' Under-10 Champion (2003) and Chinese Women's champion (2007) at 13 years.
- Srinath Narayanan, Indian prodigy, World Under-12 Champion in 2005.
- Ray Robson, USA's youngest ever IM-elect.

== Deaths ==
- Olga Rubtsova, former Women's World Chess Champion – December 13
- Vladimir Zagorovsky, former World Correspondence Champion and Champion of Moscow – November 6
- Igor Platonov, Ukrainian-Soviet Grandmaster – November 13
- Gyula Kluger, Hungarian International Master – September 23
- Theo van Scheltinga, Dutch International Master – July 30
- Triantafyllos Siaperas, Greek International Master, twice the national champion – February 25
