= 1995 in chess =

Below is a list of events in chess in 1995, as well as the top ten FIDE rated chess players of that year.

== Top players ==
FIDE top 10 by Elo rating - January 1995

1. Garry Kasparov Russia 2805
2. Anatoly Karpov Russia 2765
3. Valery Salov Russia 2715
4. Viswanathan Anand India 2715
5. Vladimir Kramnik Russia 2715
6. Alexei Shirov Spain 2710
7. Gata Kamsky United States 2710
8. Boris Gelfand Belarus 2700
9. Vassily Ivanchuk Ukraine 2700
10. Evgeny Bareev Russia 2675

== Chess news in brief ==
- Garry Kasparov defeats Viswanathan Anand 10½-7½ in New York to win the PCA World Chess Championship 1995. The match swings first to Anand, when he takes a 5-4 lead and then to Kasparov, as he then wins four of the next five games and turns the tables in dramatic fashion. The match is preceded by Anand's 6½-4½ victory over Gata Kamsky in the qualifier.
- The FIDE World Championship 1996 progresses to the semi-final stage, where Kamsky convincingly defeats Valery Salov 5½-1½ and Anatoly Karpov overcomes Boris Gelfand's challenge 6-3. The final is postponed due to the lack of any sponsorship or venue.
- Kasparov wins the Tal Memorial in Riga with 7½/10, ahead of Anand (7). A strong field includes Vassily Ivanchuk, Vladimir Kramnik and Nigel Short.
- Joël Lautier wins a double round tournament at Amsterdam, with 4/6, ahead of Kasparov (3½).
- Kamsky, Karpov and Michael Adams share a three-way win at Dos Hermanas (all 5½/9).
- Kramnik is sole winner at the Dortmund Sparkassen Tournament with 7/9. Karpov finishes second on 6½.
- Kasparov wins at Novgorod (6½/9), ahead of Short, who shared second.
- The Horgen tournament is shared between Kramnik and Ivanchuk with 7/10. Kasparov can only manage fifth and Anand does not play at all, after falling out with the organisers.
- Ivanchuk is the winner at the Linares International Chess Tournament with 10/13, ahead of Karpov (9).
- Gelfand and Kramnik share victory at Belgrade with 8/11.
- Viktor Korchnoi wins at Madrid (6½/9), ahead of Salov (6).
- In the Grand Prix series of tournaments, Ivanchuk is successful in Moscow, Adams in London and Kasparov at the New York and Paris events.
- The body of Gilles Andruet, former French Champion, is found near Paris. He was the son of famous French Rally Car Driver, Jean-Claude Andruet. Three men later stand trial for his murder.
- In the world of Computer chess, Kasparov is engaged for two more 'man-machine' contests. He gains revenge for his earlier defeat to Chess Genius, beating the Pentium-run program in a 2-game rapid match, held in Cologne. The later contest against Fritz is branded a farce, when the machine's operator slips up and plays the wrong move. Referee Stewart Reuben will not allow the move to be retracted.
- Mikhail Umansky wins the 13th Correspondence chess World Championship for the period 1989-1995.
- Florencio Campomanes steps down as FIDE President. Kirsan Ilyumzhinov is appointed the new President.
- Spectators at the British Chess Championship in Swansea witness two upcoming stars take their first full titles; Matthew Sadler wins the Men's/Open event and Harriet Hunt the Ladies' Championship.
- In Modesto, California, Patrick Wolff wins the U.S. Chess Championship commemorative ring after a play-off with Nick DeFirmian and Alexander Ivanov. The title is however shared three ways. The Ladies' title is shared between Anjelina Belakovskaia and Sharon Ellen Burtman.

== Births ==
- Sahaj Grover, Indian player who won the 2005 World Youth Chess Championship (Under 10 category) -
- Daniel Naroditsky
- Levy Rozman

== Deaths ==
- Mikhail Botvinnik, leading Soviet Grandmaster and former world chess champion - May 5
- Lev Polugaevsky, leading Soviet Grandmaster and world championship candidate - August 30
- Harry Golombek, English Grandmaster, three-time British Champion, chess journalist, writer and World War II codebreaker - January 7
- Mario Monticelli, Italian chess Grandmaster and three-time national champion - June 30
- Sir Stuart Milner-Barry, English player, theoretician, writer, former President of the British Chess Federation and World War II codebreaker - March 25
- Genrikh Kasparyan, Armenian chess player and leading chess problem composer - December 27
- Gilles Andruet, International Master, former French Champion - August 22
- Nicolaas Cortlever, Dutch International Master - April 5
- Dr. Roza Herman, Polish chess master, twice the national Ladies' champion - March 7
- Mario Napolitano, Italian master and leading correspondence chess player - October 31
- Dr. Miroslav Katetov, Czech mathematician and former Prague chess champion - December 15
- Pablo Moran, noted Spanish chess journalist and writer - November ?
