= Alekhine Memorial =

Chess tournament

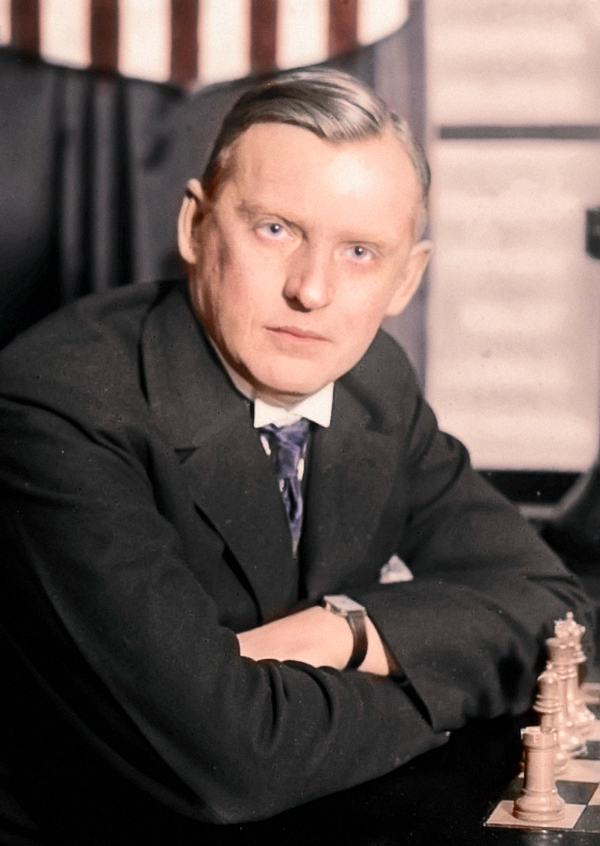
Alexander Alekhine

The Alekhine Memorial was a recurring chess tournament, organized in different cities and irregular intervals, honoring the former world chess champion Alexander Alekhine.

The Alekhine Memorial tournaments have no numbering (technically it is not a series), sometimes it is thus unclear whether or not an event can be regarded as an Alekhine Memorial (as for instance at Moscow in 1959 and the following Moscow Central Chess Club International tournaments).

Immediately after Alekhine's death, Erich Eliskases won at Rio de Janeiro in 1946 the first Alekhine Memorial ever held.

== Winners ==
Year	Host cities	Winners	Points	Players
1956	Moscow, Soviet Union	Mikhail Botvinnik (Soviet Union); Vasily Smyslov (Soviet Union)	11/15	16
1971	Moscow, Soviet Union	Anatoly Karpov (Soviet Union); Leonid Stein (Soviet Union)	11/17	18
1975	Moscow, Soviet Union	Efim Geller (Soviet Union)	10½/15	16
1986	Cascais, Portugal	Vladimir Bagirov (Soviet Union)	7/10	11
1992	Moscow, Russia	Boris Gelfand (Belarus); Viswanathan Anand (India)	4½/7	8
2013	Paris, France; Saint Petersburg, Russia	Levon Aronian (Armenia)	5½/9	10

== Alekhine Memorial 1992 ==
Alekhine Memorial 1992 was held in Moscow, Russia in November. Field included such participants as former world champion Anatoly Karpov, Alexei Shirov, Viswanathan Anand, Boris Gelfand, Jan Timman and Gata Kamsky, who were in top 10 at that time. First place was tied between Gelfand and Anand, while Kamsky finished in clear third.

Alekhine Memorial, 1992, Moscow, Russia, Category XVIII (2676)
	Player	Rating	1	2	3	4	5	6	7	8	Points
1	Boris Gelfand (Belarus)	2685		1	½	½	1	1	0	½	4½
2	Viswanathan Anand (India)	2690	0		1	½	½	1	½	1	4½
3	Gata Kamsky (United States)	2655	½	0		1	½	0	1	1	4
4	Artur Yusupov (Germany)	2640	½	½	0		½	½	1	½	3½
5	Valery Salov (Russia)	2655	0	½	½	½		½	½	1	3½
6	Anatoly Karpov (Russia)	2715	0	0	1	½	½		½	1	3½
7	Alexei Shirov (Latvia)	2710	1	½	0	0	½	½		½	3
8	Jan Timman (Netherlands)	2665	½	0	0	½	0	0	½		1½

== Alekhine Memorial 2013 ==
The first part of the tournament (rounds 1–5) was held at the pavilion built in the Tuileries Garden in Paris, France, on 20–25 April 2013. The second part (rounds 6–9) was held at the Russian Museum in Saint Petersburg, Russia, on 28 April – 1 May 2013. The prize money of the tournament is €100,000.

=== Tiebreaks ===
In the case that two or more players have equal points, the following criteria were utilized to decide the placings:

1. The largest number of games played with the black pieces.
2. The largest number of wins.
3. The result of the personal match.
4. The Koya score.
5. The Sonneborn–Berger score.

=== Standings ===
	Player	Rating	1	2	3	4	5	6	7	8	9	10	Points	Black	Wins	H2H	Koya	SB
1	Levon Aronian (Armenia)	2809	X	½	½	½	½	½	1	1	0	1	5½	5	3			
2	Boris Gelfand (Israel)	2739	½	X	½	1	½	½	½	½	1	½	5½	5	2			
3	Viswanathan Anand (India)	2783	½	½	X	0	½	1	½	½	1	½	5	4	2			
4	Michael Adams (England)	2727	½	0	1	X	½	½	0	½	½	1	4½	5	2			
5	Nikita Vitiugov (Russia)	2712	½	½	½	½	X	½	0	1	½	½	4½	5	1	0.5	3.5	20.25
6	Laurent Fressinet (France)	2706	½	½	0	½	½	X	1	½	½	½	4½	5	1	0.5	3.5	20.00
7	Vladimir Kramnik (Russia)	2801	0	½	½	1	1	0	X	½	½	½	4½	4	2	0.5	3.5	
8	Maxime Vachier-Lagrave (France)	2722	0	½	½	½	0	½	½	X	1	1	4½	4	2	0.5	2.5	
9	Ding Liren (China)	2707	1	0	0	½	½	½	½	0	X	½	3½	4	1			
10	Peter Svidler (Russia)	2747	0	½	½	0	½	½	½	0	½	X	3	4	0			
