= Adjournment (games) =

Mechanism in board games

Some board games, such as chess and Go, use an adjournment mechanism to suspend the game in progress. The rationale is that games often extend in duration beyond what is reasonable for a single session of play. Adjourning the game would allow it to be continued at another time, typically the following day. There may be a sealed move: the next move that would be made is sealed in an envelope, to be played out when the game resumes (normally played by the director or arbiter). This practice ensures that neither player knows what the board position will be when it is their next turn to move. Although the rules of chess still allow for adjournments, they are no longer standard practice.

== Chess ==
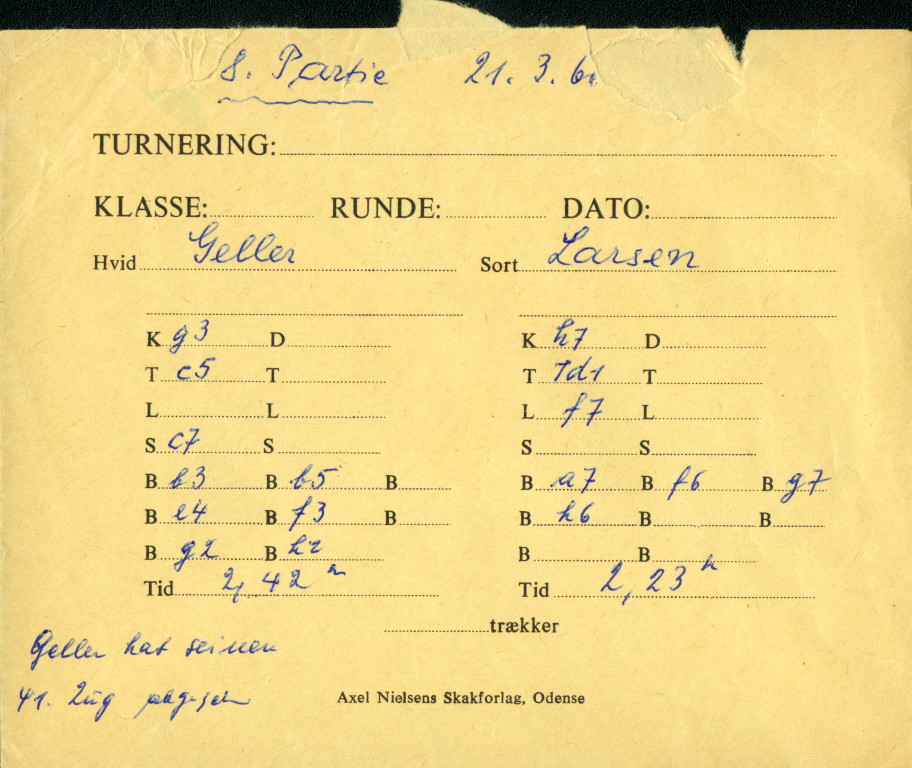
Envelope used for the adjournment of a match game Efim Geller vs. Bent Larsen (3rd place Candidates Playoff, Copenhagen 1966)

Before chess programs achieved master strength, and then became better than the best humans, adjournment was commonly offered in tournaments. When an adjournment is made, the player whose move it is secretly writes their next move on their scoresheet but does not make the move on the chessboard. Both opponents' scoresheets are then placed in the sealed-move envelope and the envelope is sealed. The names of the players, the colors, the position, the time on the clocks and other game data are recorded on the envelope; the envelope may also be signed by both players. The arbiter then keeps possession of the envelope until it is time to restart the game, at which time the arbiter opens the envelope, makes the sealed move on the board, and starts the opponent's clock.

Under USCF rules, if the sealed move is ambiguous and subject to more than one interpretation, the director may allow the opponent of the player making the sealed move to choose among the reasonable interpretations. If the sealed move is illegal and there is no reasonable interpretation, the player making the sealed move loses the game. Under FIDE rules, sealing an ambiguous move will also lose the game.

Excerpts from the USCF rules for adjourning a game of chess:

1. If a game is not finished at the end of the time prescribed for play, the director may indicate that it is time for adjournment or accept the request of either player to adjourn.
2. In tournaments in which the adjournment time is fixed beforehand, normally after the full period of the first time control, a player who has completed the number of moves required may ask the director for permission to seal early.
3. Such a player absorbs the time remaining before the scheduled adjournment by having his or her remaining time decreased by the amount of time remaining in the session. Such requests are ordinarily granted during the last hour of the session.
4. To adjourn the game, the player on move, after deciding which move to make, does not play that move on the board but instead writes it in unambiguous notation on the scoresheet, puts the scoresheet and that of the opponent in the sealed move envelope, seals the envelope, stops both clocks, and then records the remaining time on the outside of the envelope.
5. Upon resumption, the director opens the envelope, makes the sealed move on the chessboard, and starts the player’s clock.

The first three rules are designed to encourage players to continue games until the end of the session, but no longer. The fourth rule ensures that upon adjournment neither player knows what the position will be when it is that player's next turn to move, maintaining fairness of potential interim analysis of the adjourned positions. However, it can be advantageous to be the player who makes the sealed move, especially if the move forces a specific response from the other player.

Considerations on when to adjourn a game can be complex, and involve an extra dimension of psychology that is not part of strictly logical gameplay.

With the advent of strong chess playing computer programs, which can be used to analyze adjourned positions, most tournaments have abandoned adjourning games in favor of shorter time controls. The first World Chess Championship not to use adjournments was the Classical World Chess Championship 1995, while the last one to use adjournments was the FIDE World Chess Championship 1996.

== Go ==
Adjournments are common in long matches of the game of Go. Major Japanese title matches like the Honinbo, Kisei and Meijin commonly have thinking time of over eight hours per player. Such matches are played over two days and use a sealed move during the adjournment. As in chess, a sealed move may have a forced response, giving an advantage to the sealing player. Sealing a move that has no purpose other than to force a particular answer from one's opponent is considered poor etiquette.
