= FIDE World Chess Championship 1996 =

Chess match between Anatoly Karpov and Gata Kamsky

	Defending champion	Challenger
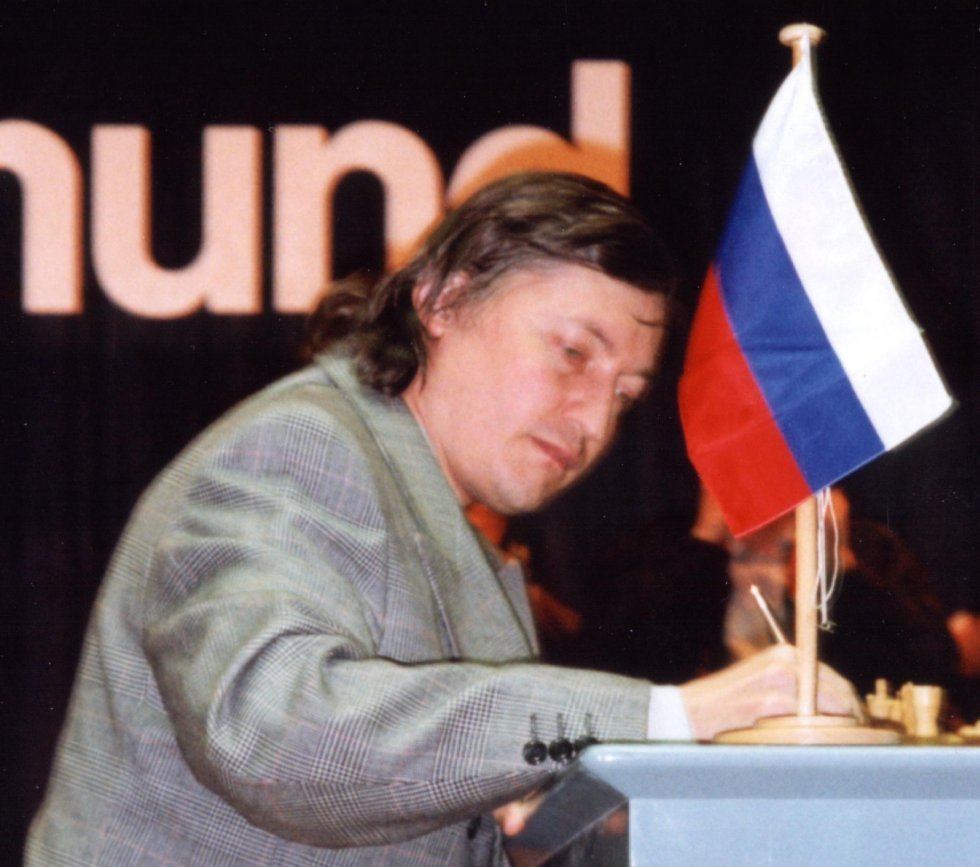
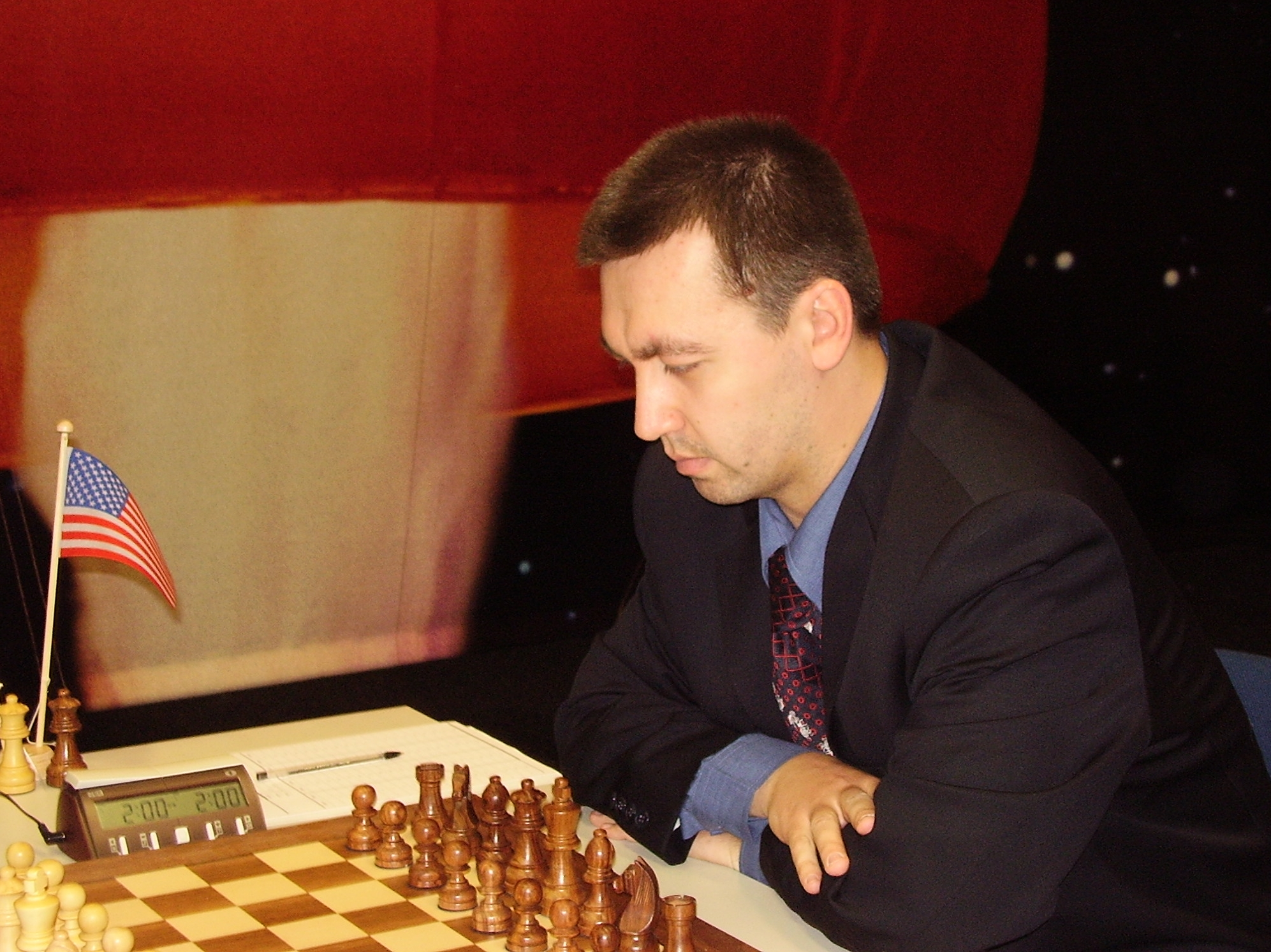
	Anatoly Karpov	Gata Kamsky
	(Russia) Anatoly Karpov	(United States) Gata Kamsky
10½	Scores	7½
	Born 23 May 1951; 45 years old	Born 2 June 1974; 22 years old
	Winner of the Candidates Match against (Belarus) Boris Gelfand	Winner of the Candidates Match against (Russia) Valery Salov
	Rating: 2770 (World No. 3)	Rating: 2735 (World No. 5)

The FIDE World Chess Championship 1996 was a chess tournament held by FIDE to determine the World Chess Champion.

== Background ==
At the time the World Chess Champion title was split.

In 1993, Nigel Short had qualified via FIDE's usual format to meet champion Garry Kasparov in a championship match. However, Kasparov and Short broke with FIDE and played under the auspices of a new organization which they had organized, the Professional Chess Association (PCA). Kasparov won this match to remain champion.

With its two top players withdrawn, FIDE awarded the two slots in its 1993 championship match to Anatoly Karpov and Jan Timman, both of whom had been defeated in earlier qualification rounds by Short. Karpov won the match to become the FIDE World Champion.

The FIDE World Chess Championship 1996 was FIDE's first since the 1993 split. Meanwhile, the PCA held its Classical World Chess Championship 1995, in which Kasparov defeated Viswanathan Anand to retain his title.

Many of the same players competed in both organizations' qualifying events. However, Kasparov and Short did not compete in the FIDE event.

== 1993 Interzonal tournament ==
FIDE held an Interzonal tournament in Biel in July 1993, run as a 73 player, 13 round Swiss system tournament.

The top 10 from the Interzonal qualified for a Championship tournament. In the event of a tie break, players were ranked by the sum of their opponents' Elo ratings, excluding the lowest rating.

1993 FIDE Interzonal Tournament
		Rating	1	2	3	4	5	6	7	8	9	10	11	12	13	Total	Tie break
1	GM Boris Gelfand (Belarus)	2670	=35	+49	=6	+39	=3	+43	=2	+10	+17	=5	=13	=9	=7	9	
2	GM Paul van der Sterren (Netherlands)	2525	=51	=41	+71	+31	+26	=13	=1	=6	=4	=7	+17	=8	=3	8½	31545
3	GM Gata Kamsky (United States)	2645	+12	=25	+47	=28	=1	=16	+32	=4	+6	=17	=5	=7	=2	8½	31470
4	GM Alexander Khalifman (Russia)	2645	+58	=43	+45	+8	-10	=6	+24	=3	=2	=16	+26	=5	=9	8½	31390
5	GM Michael Adams (England)	2630	-44	+60	-22	+68	+62	+65	+28	+9	=7	=1	=3	=4	=6	8½	31345
6	GM Leonid Yudasin (Israel)	2605	+67	=44	=1	=36	+48	=4	+23	=2	-3	=11	+29	+13	=5	8½	31340
7	GM Valery Salov (Russia)	2685	=49	+71	=31	+55	+42	+24	=10	-17	=5	=2	+21	=3	=1	8½	31285
8	GM Joël Lautier (France)	2620	+26	+62	=17	-4	=22	=21	+33	=16	=9	=15	+27	=2	+24	8½	31280
9	GM Vladimir Kramnik (Russia)	2710	-45	+19	=35	+38	+55	+37	=17	-5	=8	+31	+16	=1	=4	8½	31240
10	GM Viswanathan Anand (India)	2725	=16	=22	+44	+25	+4	=17	=7	-1	=21	=27	=18	+28	=11	8	31435
11	GM Vladimir Epishin (Russia)	2655	=18	=35	=38	=45	=41	=36	+42	+39	=13	=6	=24	+15	=10	8	31305
12	GM Smbat Lputian (Armenia)	2555	-3	+70	-39	+71	=31	=56	-14	+55	=20	+52	=51	+40	+32	8	31275
13	GM Alexei Shirov (Latvia)	2685	=65	+53	=32	=22	+47	=2	=16	=29	=11	+23	=1	-6	+21	8	31195
14	GM Vassily Ivanchuk (Ukraine)	2705	=22	=16	=21	=65	=25	=47	+12	=37	=23	=29	+33	=24	+27	8	31125
15	GM Ivan Sokolov (Bosnia and Herzegovina)	2610	+66	=23	+57	-17	=21	=22	=37	=27	+36	=8	+35	-11	+30	8	31030
16	GM Lajos Portisch (Hungary)	2585	=10	=14	=40	+44	+56	=3	=13	=8	+29	=4	-9	=18	=20	7½	31855
17	GM Evgeny Bareev (Russia)	2660	+38	+39	=8	+15	=24	=10	=9	+7	-1	=3	-2	=21	=18	7½	31580
18	GM Evgeny Sveshnikov (Latvia)	2570	=11	=29	+20	-37	=50	-33	+70	+43	=28	+45	=10	=16	=17	7½	31515
19	GM Bosko Abramovic (Federal Republic of Yugoslavia)	2460	=47	-9	+53	+33	=29	-26	=56	+59	-31	+46	=37	+45	=22	7½	31140
20	GM Judit Polgár (Hungary)	2630	=34	=46	-18	=27	+58	=41	-35	+57	=12	+43	=31	+26	=16	7½	30850
21	GM Alexey Dreev (Russia)	2570	+40	-24	=14	+52	=15	=8	+43	=31	=10	+22	-7	=17	-13	7	31795
22	GM Patrick Wolff (United States)	2585	=14	=10	+5	=13	=8	=15	=31	=40	+52	-21	-28	+56	=19	7	31700
23	GM Yasser Seirawan (United States)	2575	+63	=15	=51	=56	+36	=28	-6	+24	=14	-13	=40	=31	=33	7	31625
24	GM Mikhail Gurevich (Belgium)	2605	+69	+21	=28	+43	=17	-7	-4	-23	+44	+39	=11	=14	-8	7	31465
25	GM Lembit Oll (Estonia)	2595	+70	=3	=56	-10	=14	-40	=46	=34	=38	+65	-30	+63	+51	7	31415
26	GM Dibyendu Barua (India)	2510	-8	+63	+41	+51	-2	+19	-29	+32	=35	+40	-4	-20	=28	7	31405
27	GM Jeroen Piket (Netherlands)	2590	-71	+59	-42	=20	+61	+52	=40	=15	+56	=10	-8	+38	-14	7	31360
28	GM Viktor Korchnoi (Switzerland)	2625	+30	+42	=24	=3	=37	=23	-5	-35	=18	+41	+22	-10	=26	7	31225
29	GM Boris Gulko (United States)	2635	=46	=18	=58	+35	=19	=42	+26	=13	-16	=14	-6	+43	=31	7	31120
30	IM Xu Jun (China)	2535	-28	=68	+72	=50	-39	-51	+62	+65	=32	=36	+25	+37	-15	7	30985
31	GM Robert Hübner (Germany)	2605	+60	=57	=7	-2	=12	+55	=22	=21	+19	-9	=20	=23	=29	7	30980
32	GM Jóhann Hjartarson (Iceland)	2605	+59	=55	=13	-42	+45	+39	-3	-26	=30	=51	+49	+35	-12	7	30970
33	GM Julio Granda (Peru)	2605	-55	=61	+49	-19	+34	+18	-8	+51	=45	=35	-14	+47	=23	7	30930
34	GM Ye Jiangchuan (China)	2535	=20	-48	=68	=46	-33	+69	=57	=25	=47	=42	+65	=36	+45	7	30880
35	GM Eric Lobron (Germany)	2575	=1	=11	=9	-29	+46	=48	+20	+28	=26	=33	-15	-32	=38	6½	31480
36	GM Vasily Smyslov (Russia)	2520	=48	=37	+62	=6	-23	=11	=38	+41	-15	=30	=52	=34	=40	6½	31260
37	GM Jon Speelman (England)	2605	=54	=36	+46	+18	=28	-9	=15	=14	-40	+56	=19	-30	=41	6½	31165
38	IM Ilya Gurevich (United States)	2575	-17	+67	=11	-9	+69	=50	=36	-56	=25	+44	+39	-27	=35	6½	31155
39	GM Zdenko Kožul (Bosnia and Herzegovina)	2595	+64	-17	+12	-1	+30	-32	+65	-11	+42	-24	-38	=48	+61	6½	31150
40	GM Kiril Georgiev (Bulgaria)	2660	-21	+66	=16	+57	-43	+25	=27	=22	+37	-26	=23	-12	=36	6½	30835
41	GM Curt Hansen (Denmark)	2590	=72	=2	-26	+73	=11	=20	=48	-36	+66	-28	+61	=51	=37	6½	30735
42	GM Evgeny Pigusov (Russia)	2585	+74*	-28	+27	+32	-7	=29	-11	=48	-39	=34	=46	=52	=49	6	31305
43	GM Ian Rogers (Australia)	2595	+68	=4	+48	-24	+40	-1	-21	-18	+59	-20	+66	-29	=50	6	31195
44	GM Ľubomír Ftáčnik (Slovakia)	2535	+5	=6	-10	-16	=57	+62	+50	-52	-24	-38	=67	=58	+68	6	31130
45	GM Loek van Wely (Netherlands)	2585	+9	=50	-4	=11	-32	=70	+60	+47	=33	-18	+48	-19	-34	6	31090
46	GM Vasil Spasov (Bulgaria)	2540	=29	=20	-37	=34	-35	+73	=25	+50	=48	-19	=42	=62	=47	6	31040
47	GM Vladimir Akopian (Armenia)	2600	=19	+54	-3	+61	-13	=14	=51	-45	=34	=50	+55	-33	=46	6	30995
48	GM Jaan Ehlvest (Estonia)	2620	=36	+34	-43	+58	-6	=35	=41	=42	=46	=49	-45	=39	=52	6	30985
49	GM Jesús Nogueiras (Cuba)	2580	=7	-1	-33	=60	=70	+66	=55	=58	+53	=48	-32	=50	=42	6	30910
50	GM Simen Agdestein (Norway)	2610	+61	=45	-55	=30	=18	=38	-44	-46	+63	=47	=56	=49	=43	6	30910
51	GM Predrag Nikolić (Bosnia and Herzegovina)	2625	=2	+72	=23	-26	-65	+30	=47	-33	+58	=32	=12	=41	-25	6	30840
52	GM Ilya Smirin (Israel)	2640	-57	=69	+73	-21	+63	-27	+53	+44	-22	-12	=36	=42	=48	6	30800
53	IM Artur Frolov (Ukraine)	2535	=56	-13	-19	-69	+72	+71	-52	+64	-49	=59	-63	bye	+66	6	30320
54	IM Darcy Lima (Brazil)	2475	=37	-47	-65	=67	-73	=68	+69	=71	=57	-66	bye	+59	=63	6	30105
55	GM Walter Arencibia (Cuba)	2485	+33	=32	+50	-7	-9	-31	=49	-12	+71	=62	-47	=68	=56	5½	30935
56	GM Miguel Illescas (Spain)	2625	=53	+65	=25	=23	-16	=12	=19	+38	-27	-37	=50	-22	=55	5½	30880
57	GM Vidmantas Mališauskas (Lithuania)	2540	+52	=31	-15	-40	=44	=59	=34	-20	=54	=58	=68	=66	=62	5½	30820
58	GM Ferdinand Hellers (Sweden)	2560	-4	+64	=29	-48	-20	=67	+72	=49	-51	=57	=59	=44	=60	5½	30690
59	FM Tigran Nalbandian (Armenia)	2485	-32	-27	+64	-62	+68	=57	+63	-19	-43	=53	=58	-54	bye	5½	30505
60	IM Lucas Brunner (Switzerland)	2475	-31	-5	=66	=49	=71	+61	-45	=68	-65	bye	=62	=64	=58	5½	30335
61	GM Alex Sherzer (United States)	2500	-50	=33	+69	-47	-27	-60	-68	+73	bye	+64	-41	+67	-39	5½	30325
62	GM Semen Dvoirys (Russia)	2590	+73	-8	-36	+59	-5	-44	-30	=67	+70	=55	=60	=46	=57	5½	30285
63	GM Veselin Topalov (Bulgaria)	2650	-23	-26	+67	=70	-52	=64	-59	+72	-50	+73	+53	-25	=54	5½	30225
64	IM Hichem Hamdouchi (Morocco)	2455	-39	-58	-59	bye	=66	=63	+73	-53	=68	-61	+70	=60	=65	5½	30200
65	GM Dmitry Gurevich (United States)	2575	=13	-56	+54	=14	+51	-5	-39	-30	+60	-25	-34	=69	=64	5	30965
66	IM Giorgi Bagaturov (Georgia)	2495	-15	-40	=60	=72	=64	-49	+67	+70	-41	+54	-43	=57	-53	5	30435
67	IM Amanmurad Kakagaldyev (Turkmenistan)	2465	-6	-38	-63	=54	bye	=58	-66	=62	+69	=68	=44	-61	=72	5	30330
68	IM Werner Hug (Switzerland)	2430	-43	=30	=34	-5	-59	=54	+61	=60	=64	=67	=57	=55	-44	5	30255
69	IM Alexandre Lesiège (Canada)	2485	-24	=52	-61	+53	-38	-34	-54	bye	-67	=72	=73	=65	+71	5	30070
70	IM Pablo Zarnicki (Argentina)	2455	-25	-12	bye	=63	=49	=45	-18	-66	-62	+71	-64	=72	=73	4½	30270
71	David Gluckman (South Africa)	2330	+27	-7	-2	-12	=60	-53	bye	=54	-55	-70	=72	+73	-69	4½	30110
72	IM Nikolaos Kalesis (Greece)	2410	=41	-51	-30	=66	-53	bye	-58	-63	-73	=69	=71	=70	=67	4	30170
73	IM Konstantinos Moutousis (Greece)	2425	-62	bye	-52	-41	+54	-46	-64	-61	+72	-63	=69	-71	=70	4	30140
74	Esam Aly Ahmed (Egypt)	2320	-42*													0	

Esam Aly Ahmed forfeited his first-round game against Pigusov and was dropped from the tournament.

== 1994–96 Championship tournament ==
The top 10 from the Interzonal were joined by 1993 FIDE World Champion Anatoly Karpov, 1993 FIDE runner-up Jan Timman, and 1993 Candidates semi-finalist Artur Yusupov. (The other 1993 semi-finalist was the excluded Nigel Short).

The first round matches were held in Wijk aan Zee in January 1994, and the second round matches and third round matches in Sanghi Nagar in July–August 1994 and February 1995, respectively. If tied after the specified number of games (which happened only in the Kamsky-Anand match), rapid chess games were played as tie breaks.

The format was a departure from all previous world championships, in that the reigning champion (Karpov) was not seeded directly into a championship match. Instead, he joined the competition at the third round (Candidates final).

First round (best of 8)
(United States) Gata Kamsky	4½
(Netherlands) Paul van der Sterren	2½
(India) Viswanathan Anand	4½
(Germany) Artur Yusupov	2½
(Netherlands) Jan Timman	4½
(France) Joël Lautier	3½
(Russia) Alexander Khalifman	1
(Russia) Valery Salov	5
(Belarus) Boris Gelfand	5
(England) Michael Adams	3
(Israel) Leonid Yudasin	2½
(Russia) Vladimir Kramnik	4½

Second round (best of 8)
(United States) Gata Kamsky	6
(India) Viswanathan Anand	4
(Netherlands) Jan Timman	3½
(Russia) Valery Salov	4½
(Belarus) Boris Gelfand	4½
(Russia) Vladimir Kramnik	3½

Third round (best of 10)
(United States) Gata Kamsky	5½
(Russia) Valery Salov	1½
(Belarus) Boris Gelfand	3
(Russia) Anatoly Karpov	6

Championship match (best of 20)
(United States) Gata Kamsky	7½
(Russia) Anatoly Karpov	10½

== 1996 Championship match ==
The final was held in Elista, Russia in June–July 1996 and played as best of 20 games.

FIDE World Chess Championship Match 1996
	Rating	1	2	3	4	5	6	7	8	9	10	11	12	13	14	15	16	17	18	Total
Anatoly Karpov (Russia)	2770	1	0	½	1	½	1	1	½	1	0	½	½	½	1	½	0	½	½	10½
Gata Kamsky (United States)	2735	0	1	½	0	½	0	0	½	0	1	½	½	½	0	½	1	½	½	7½

Karpov won and retained his title.
