= Sanghi Temple =

Temple in Telangana, India

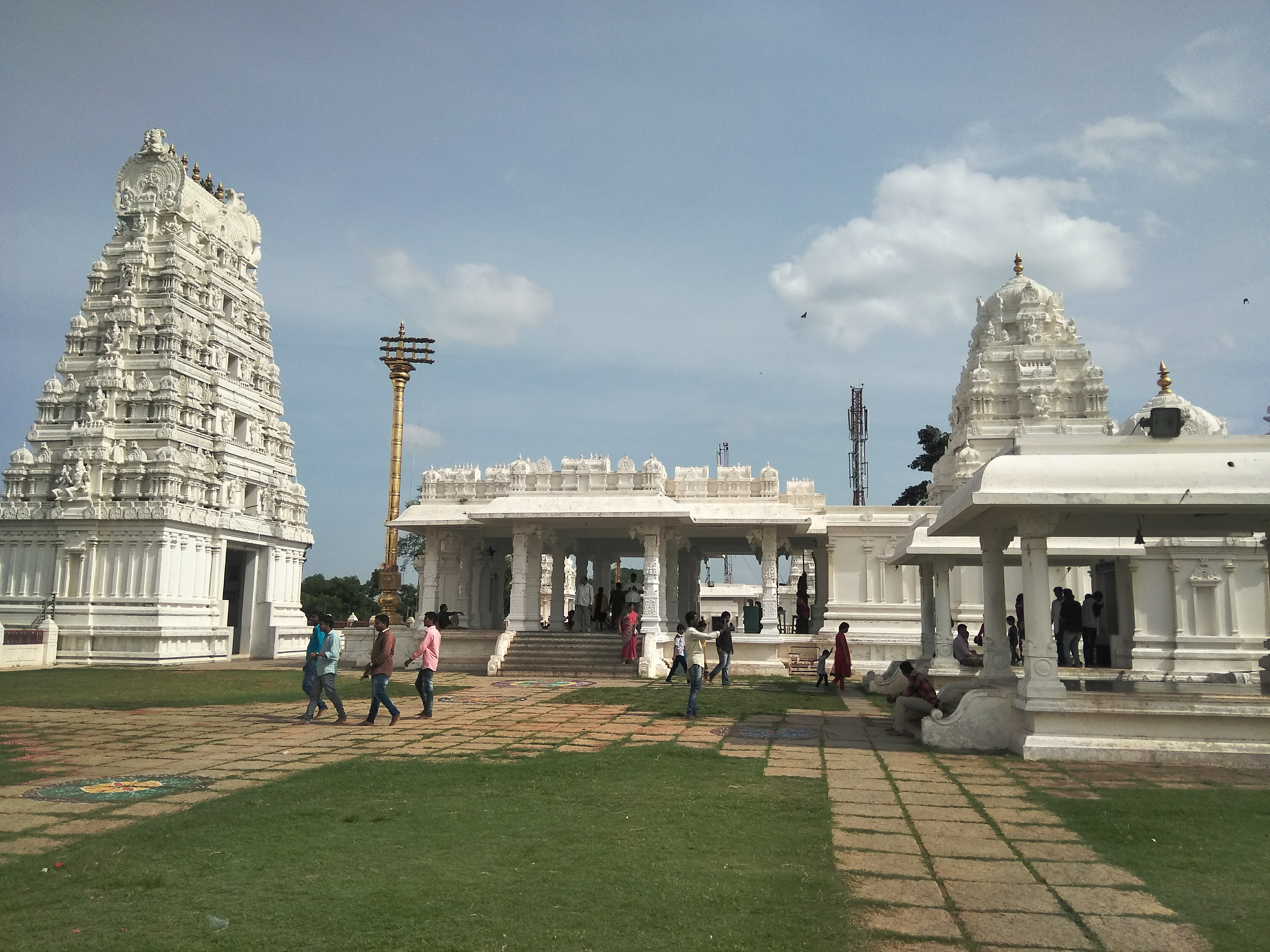

Religion
- Affiliation: Hinduism
- Deity: Lord Venkateswara

Location
- Location: Hayathnagar near Hyderabad
- State: Telangana
- Country: India
- Interactive map of Sanghi Temple
- Coordinates: 17.2668°N 78.6758°E

Architecture
- Completed: 1991

Website
- http://www.sanghitemple.in

Sanghi Temple, which is said to be the replica of Tirumala temple is located at Sanghi Nagar in Telangana in India, is about 35 km from Hyderabad city.

The sacred Raja Gopuram, which is very tall, can be seen from several kilometers away.

The temple is located on the top of Paramanand Giri hill, which attracts a number of devotees.

The temple is managed by Mrs Anita Sanghi of the Sanghi Family.
