= TePe Sigeman & Co chess tournament =

Chess tournament in Malmö, Sweden

TePe Sigeman & Co Chess tournament
Tournament information
- Location: Malmö, Sweden
- Dates: 1–7 May 2026
- Format: 7-round (Note: The tournament currently invites eight players, thus seven rounds. Sigeman & Co started out as a ten player tournament. This lasted until 2008, except 2000 when four players participated. 2009 - 2011 and 2014 - 2018 featured six players.) single round robin tournament

Current champion
- Magnus Carlsen

The TePe Sigeman & Co chess tournament is an annual chess tournament in Malmö, Sweden organised by Limhamns SK, a local Malmö chess club. The tournament was known as the Sigeman & Co chess tournament from its inauguration in 1993 until 2014, being named after local lawyer Johan Sigeman and his law firm, who sponsored the event during these years. After the 2014 tournament, the organizer retired and the law firm lost its financiers. After two years of inactivity the arrival of a new sponsor, dental products manufacturer TePe, restarted the tournament in 2017, now renamed to its current name. The tournament has been held annually since then (with the exception of 2020 due to the COVID-19 pandemic).

In the year 2000, Judit Polgár won ahead of Jan Timman. 2003 was the first edition attracting a 2700+ rated player, Vassily Ivanchuk, who also won. That year, the tournament took place both in Malmö and neighboring Copenhagen, Denmark. In 2004, the Sigeman & Co was the first tournament a 13-year old Magnus Carlsen played as a Grandmaster; finishing third. He returned 22 years later to win the 2026 edition.

The 30th edition of this tournament was held from 20 to 26 May 2025 at Elite Plaza Hotel, Malmö. It was won by Javokhir Sindarov.

== Winners ==
#	Year	Winner
1	1993	Ferdinand Hellers (Sweden)
2	1994	Ferdinand Hellers (Sweden); Curt Hansen (Denmark)
3	1995	Ivan Sokolov (Bosnia and Herzegovina)
4	1996	Viktor Korchnoi (Switzerland)
5	1997	Ferdinand Hellers (Sweden)
6	1998	Joël Lautier (France); Igor Miladinović (Greece)
7	1999	Boris Gelfand (Israel)
8	2000	Judit Polgár (Hungary)
9	2001	Boris Gulko (USA); Jan Timman (Netherlands)
10	2002	Nigel Short (England)
11	2003	Vasyl Ivanchuk (Ukraine)
12	2004	Peter Heine Nielsen (Denmark); Curt Hansen (Denmark)
13	2005	Krishnan Sasikiran (India); Jan Timman (Netherlands)
14	2006	Jan Timman (Netherlands)
15	2007	Ivan Cheparinov (Bulgaria)
16	2008	Tiger Hillarp Persson (Sweden)
17	2009	Nigel Short (England)
18	2010	Anish Giri (Netherlands)
19	2011	Anish Giri (Netherlands); Wesley So (Philippines); Hans Tikkanen (Sweden)
20	2012	Fabiano Caruana (Italy)
21	2013	Nigel Short (England); Richárd Rapport (Hungary); Nils Grandelius (Sweden)
22	2014	Laurent Fressinet (France)
23	2017	Nils Grandelius (Sweden); Baadur Jobava (Georgia)
24	2018	Nils Grandelius (Sweden); Vidit Gujrathi (India)
25	2019	Gawain Jones (England)
26	2021	Jorden van Foreest (Netherlands)
27	2022	Hans Niemann (USA)
28	2023	Peter Svidler (FIDE)
29	2024	Nodirbek Abdusattorov (Uzbekistan)
30	2025	Javokhir Sindarov (Uzbekistan)
31	2026	Magnus Carlsen (Norway)

== 2024 ==
The 2024 event took place at Elite Plaza Hotel in Malmö. The time control was 90 minutes for the first 40 moves followed by 30 minutes for the rest of the game, with a 30-second increment from move one. There was a three way tie at the top which was broken at first by a round robin, in which Svidler was beaten by Nodirbek and Arjun. Later Arjun and Nodirbek would compete in two more matches after which Nodirbek came out as the winner. All of the tiebreaks were in the blitz format.

TePe Sigeman & Co tournament, April 27 – 3 May 2024, Malmö, Sweden
	Player	Rating	1	2	3	4	5	6	7	8	Points
1	Nodirbek Abdusattorov (Uzbekistan)	2766		½	½	0	½	1	1	1	4.5
2	Arjun Erigaisi (India)	2756	½		½	½	1	½	½	1	4.5
3	Peter Svidler (FIDE)	2689	½	½		1	1	½	½	½	4.5
4	Anton Korobov (Ukraine)	2651	1	½	0		0	½	1	1	4
5	Ju Wenjun (China)	2559	½	0	0	1		1	½	½	3.5
6	Vincent Keymer (Germany)	2726	0	½	½	½	0		1	1	3.5
7	Nils Grandelius (Sweden)	2664	0	½	½	0	½	0		½	2
8	Marc'Andria Maurizzi (France)	2605	0	0	½	0	½	0	½		1.5

Tiebreaker 1
	Player	Rating	1	2	3	Points
1	Nodirbek Abdusattorov (Uzbekistan)	2766		½	1	1.5
1	Arjun Erigaisi (India)	2756	½		1	1.5
3	Peter Svidler (FIDE)	2689	0	0		0

Tiebreaker 2
	Player	Rating	1	2	Total
1	Nodirbek Abdusattorov (Uzbekistan)	2766	½	1	1.5
2	Arjun Erigaisi (India)	2756	½	0	0.5

== 2025 ==
The 2025 event took place at Elite Plaza Hotel in Malmö. The time control was 90 minutes for the first 40 moves followed by 30 minutes for the rest of the game, with a 30-second increment from move one. Javokhir Sindarov won the tournament with 4.5/7.

TePe Sigeman & Co tournament, 20–26 May 2025, Malmö, Sweden, Category XVI (2647)
	Player	Rating	1	2	3	4	5	6	7	8	Points
1	Javokhir Sindarov (Uzbekistan)	2706		½	½	½	½	1	1	½	4.5
2	Yağız Kaan Erdoğmuş (Turkey)	2618	½		½	½	1	½	1	0	4
3	Nils Grandelius (Sweden)	2637	½	½		½	½	0	1	1	4
4	Ray Robson (USA)	2692	½	½	½		½	½	½	½	3.5
5	Richard Rapport (Hungary)	2722	½	0	½	½		1	0	1	3.5
6	Erwin l'Ami (Netherlands)	2621	0	½	1	½	0		½	½	3
7	Tan Zhongyi (China)	2536	0	0	0	½	1	½		1	3
8	Vasyl Ivanchuk (Ukraine)	2644	½	1	0	½	0	½	0		2.5

== 2026 ==
The 2026 event took place at Elite Plaza Hotel in Malmö. The time control was 90 minutes for the first 40 moves followed by 30 minutes for the rest of the game, with a 30-second increment from move one. The seven round robin rounds ended in a tie for first between Arjun Erigaisi and Magnus Carlsen. The tiebreaking process began with two games at a time control of 3 minutes with a 2-second increment per move. Carlsen won the first game but lost the next, resulting in a sudden death game to decide the championship, where White starts with 30 seconds less (2 minutes 30 seconds). Carlsen, playing Black, defeated Erigaisi to win the tournament.

TePe Sigeman & Co tournament, 1–7 May 2026, Malmö, Sweden, Category XIX (2707.1)
	Player	Rating	1	2	3	4	5	6	7	8	Points
T–1	Arjun Erigaisi (India)	2751		½	½	½	1	½	1	1	5
T–1	Magnus Carlsen (Norway)	2840	½		1	½	0	1	1	1	5
T–3	Yağız Kaan Erdoğmuş (Turkey)	2708	½	0		½	½	½	1	1	4
T–3	Nodirbek Abdusattorov (Uzbekistan)	2780	½	½	½		½	½	1	½	4
5	Jorden van Foreest (Netherlands)	2735	0	1	½	½		½	½	½	3½
6	Andy Woodward (United States)	2635	½	0	½	½	½		0	1	3
7	Zhu Jiner (China)	2546	0	0	0	0	½	1		½	2
8	Nils Grandelius (Sweden)	2662	0	0	0	½	½	0	½		1½

Tiebreaker
	Name	Rating	1	2	SD	Total
1	(Norway) Magnus Carlsen	2840	1	0	1	2
2	(India) Arjun Erigaisi	2751	0	1	0	1

=== Points by round ===
This table shows the total number of wins minus the total number of losses each player had after each round. The symbol '=' indicates the player had won and lost the same number of games after that round. Green backgrounds indicate the player(s) with the highest score after each round. Red backgrounds indicate players who could no longer win the tournament after each round.

Rank	Player	Rounds						
Rank	Player	1	2	3	4	5	6	7
T–1	Arjun Erigaisi (India)	=	=	+1	+1	+2	+3	+3
T–1	Magnus Carlsen (Norway)	=	+1	+1	=	+1	+2	+3
T–3	Yağız Kaan Erdoğmuş (Turkey)	=	=	+1	+2	+2	+2	+1
T–3	Nodirbek Abdusattorov (Uzbekistan)	+1	+1	+1	+1	+1	+1	+1
5	Jorden van Foreest (Netherlands)	=	=	=	+1	=	=	=
6	Andy Woodward (United States)	+1	+1	+1	=	=	–1	–1
7	Zhu Jiner (China)	–1	–1	–2	–1	–2	–3	–3
8	Nils Grandelius (Sweden)	–1	–2	–3	–4	–4	–4	–4

=== Results by round ===
Round 1 – 1 May 2026
Jorden van Foreest	½–½	Yagiz Kaan Erdogmus
Zhu Jiner	0–1	Nodirbek Abdusattorov
Andy Woodward	1–0	Nils Grandelius
Magnus Carlsen	½–½	Arjun Erigaisi
Round 2 – 2 May 2026
Yagiz Kaan Erdogmus	½–½	Arjun Erigaisi
Nils Grandelius	0–1	Magnus Carlsen
Nodirbek Abdusattorov	½–½	Andy Woodward
Jorden van Foreest	½–½	Zhu Jiner
Round 3 – 3 May 2026
Zhu Jiner	0–1	Yagiz Kaan Erdogmus
Andy Woodward	½–½	Jorden van Foreest
Magnus Carlsen	½–½	Nodirbek Abdusattorov
Arjun Erigaisi	1–0	Nils Grandelius
Round 4 – 4 May 2026
Yagiz Kaan Erdogmus	1–0	Nils Grandelius
Nodirbek Abdusattorov	½–½	Arjun Erigaisi
Jorden van Foreest	1–0	Magnus Carlsen
Zhu Jiner	1–0	Andy Woodward
Round 5 – 5 May 2026
Andy Woodward	½–½	Yagiz Kaan Erdogmus
Magnus Carlsen	1–0	Zhu Jiner
Arjun Erigaisi	1–0	Jorden van Foreest
Nils Grandelius	½–½	Nodirbek Abdusattorov
Round 6 – 6 May 2026
Yagiz Kaan Erdogmus	½–½	Nodirbek Abdusattorov
Jorden van Foreest	½–½	Nils Grandelius
Zhu Jiner	0–1	Arjun Erigaisi
Andy Woodward	0–1	Magnus Carlsen
Round 7 – 7 May 2026
Magnus Carlsen	1–0	Yagiz Kaan Erdogmus
Arjun Erigaisi	½–½	Andy Woodward
Nils Grandelius	½–½	Zhu Jiner
Nodirbek Abdusattorov	½–½	Jorden van Foreest

== See also ==
- List of strong chess tournaments
