= Michael Adams (chess player) =

English chess grandmaster (born 1971)

- Adams at the 2026 Chess Olympiad

Personal information
- Born: 17 November 1971 (age 55) Truro, Cornwall, England

Chess career
- Country: England
- Title: Grandmaster (1989)
- FIDE rating: 2597 (November 2026)
- Peak rating: 2761 (September 2013)
- Peak ranking: No. 4 (October 2000)

Michael Adams (born 17 November 1971) is an English chess grandmaster and nine-time British Chess Champion. His highest ranking is world No. 4, achieved several times from October 2000 to October 2002. His peak Elo rating is 2761, the highest achieved by an English chess player.

Several times a World Championship Candidate, he reached the semifinals in 1997, 1999 and 2000. He reached the final at the 2004 FIDE Championship, narrowly losing out to Rustam Kasimdzhanov in the tie-break games.

Adams won the World Senior Chess Championship (Over-50 category) in 2023.

== Early career ==
Adams was born on 17 November 1971 in Truro, Cornwall, England. By 1980, his chess talent had been recognised by the British Chess Federation, and he received high-level coaching from former European Junior Champion Shaun Taulbut and coaching from local chess champion Michael Prettejohn. In 1981, aged nine, Adams entered the Cornwall (County) Under-9 Championship and won it. He won the Under-13, Under-15 and Under-18 Championships at the same event. The last two contests clashed for one day, and he had to play them simultaneously, commuting cautiously between different rooms, some thirty metres apart.

In 1987, he took the silver medal at the World Under-16 Championship, held in Innsbruck, behind the Icelandic player Hannes Stefánsson. Later that year, at the age of fifteen, he became the world's youngest International Master (IM).

Two books co-written with his father, Bill Adams, Development of a Grandmaster (1991) and Chess in the Fast Lane (1996), discuss his early chess career. In 1988 a television documentary was screened nationwide featuring Adams and Gary Lane. It is now regularly screened at chess film festivals.

== National success ==
Adams' early endeavours were already beginning to pay dividends at the British Championship of 1987, where he gained his final IM norm and took the best junior prize. He proceeded to win the full Championship title in 1989, at just seventeen years old (the youngest British Champion in history, until Shreyas Royal in 2026). He won again in 1997, jointly with Matthew Sadler. Then, after a lengthy break from the event, he returned to claim further titles in 2010, 2011, 2016, 2018, 2019, 2023 and 2025.

His win at the British Chess Championship 2016 with 10/11 tied the record score set by Julian Hodgson in 1992.

Adams also won the British Rapidplay Championship in 1995, 1996 and 1999.

== World Championship candidate ==
Adams has performed strongly in several World Chess Championship tournaments.

In 1993 he finished equal first (with Viswanathan Anand) in the Groningen Interzonal tournament to determine challengers for the PCA World Chess Championship 1995. This took him to the Candidates Tournament matches, where he beat Sergei Tiviakov in the quarter-finals but lost to Anand in the semifinals.

He also qualified for the Candidates Tournament for the FIDE World Chess Championship 1996, losing to Boris Gelfand in the first round of matches.

In 1997, he took part in the 1997–1998 FIDE World Championship, which, for the first time, was a large knockout event, the winner of which would play a match against reigning champion Anatoly Karpov. This tournament included most of the world's top players (Garry Kasparov, Vladimir Kramnik, and Gata Kamsky were the only notable absentees), and Adams won short matches against Tamaz Giorgadze, Sergei Tiviakov, Peter Svidler, Loek van Wely and Nigel Short, before coming up against Anand in the final round. Their four games at normal time controls were all drawn, as were four rapidplay games at quicker time limits before Anand won the sudden-death game, thereby eliminating Adams from the competition.

The 1999 FIDE World Championship resulted in another semifinal finish for Adams before losing to Vladimir Akopian. Nevertheless, he reached the semifinals of the 2000 FIDE World Championship before losing to eventual winner Anand. In the 2002 FIDE World Championship he won his first three rounds before being knocked out in the 'round of 16' by Peter Svidler.

Adams came closest to claiming a world title at the 2004 FIDE Championship when he reached the final, winning matches against Hussein Asabri, Karen Asrian, Hichem Hamdouchi, Hikaru Nakamura, Vladimir Akopian and Teimour Radjabov. However, he lost to Rustam Kasimdzhanov in the final (3½–4½ after rapidplay tie-breaks, the match having been tied 3–3 after the six standard games).

As runner-up in the 2004 event, Adams was one of eight players invited to the FIDE World Chess Championship 2005. He finished in equal sixth–seventh place, with a score of 5½ out of 14.

In May–June 2007, Adams participated in the Candidates Tournament to qualify for the FIDE World Chess Championship 2007. He drew 3–3 with Alexey Shirov in the first round and was beaten 2½–½ in the rapidplay playoff.

== Other results ==
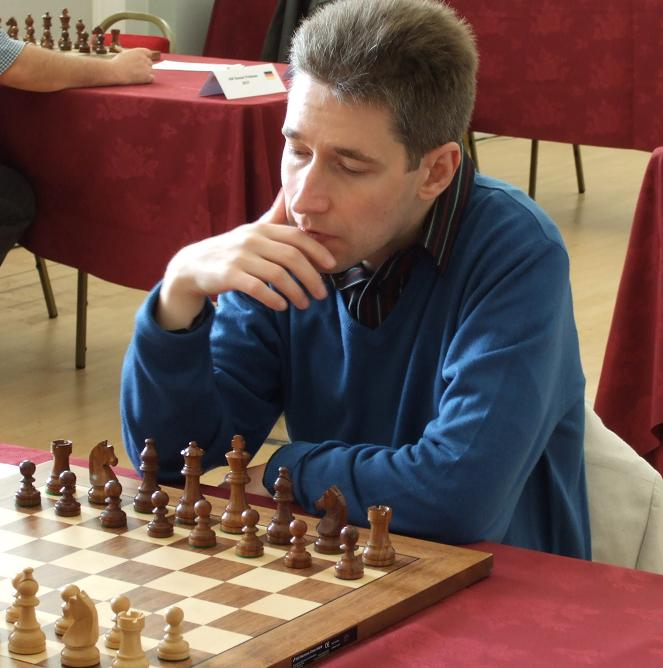
GM Adams at the EU championship, Liverpool 2008

Among his other notable results were first place at Terrassa in 1991, joint first at Dos Hermanas in 1995 (with Kamsky and Karpov), joint first at Dortmund Sparkassen Chess Meeting in 1998 (with Kramnik and Svidler) and clear first at Dos Hermanas in 1999, ahead of Kramnik, Anand, Svidler, Karpov, Veselin Topalov, Judit Polgár and others.

In more recent times, he won the fifth Howard Staunton Memorial Tournament in August 2007, achieving a score of 8½/11 (six wins, five draws), picking up the top purse of £1000. The highest-seeded player in the tournament by 45 Elo points, Adams finished a full point ahead of Dutch Grand Masters Ivan Sokolov and Loek van Wely. The tournament, one of a series held in London, commemorated the life of the nineteenth-century English chess master Howard Staunton. Prior to the start of the tournament, on 4 August, Adams married his longtime girlfriend, the actress Tara MacGowran, at a ceremony in Taunton, close to where they live.

In September 2007, Adams took part in a match between the United Kingdom and China, held in Liverpool, England. Playing alongside Adams was former World Championship challenger GM Nigel Short. This chess event was the first time in almost 15 years that the two GMs had played chess together on British soil. Overall, he scored 3½/6, conceding one loss to GM Zhang Pengxiang (ELO 2649, at the match) in round four. The UK team lost the match to China, who had also defeated a Russian chess team a few weeks before, 20–28.

Adams won the 2nd Ruy Lopez Masters tournament held in Mérida, Spain, 4–13 April 2008, scoring 5½/7 to finish a half-point ahead of Zhang Pengxiang. The tournament was an eight-player round-robin with an average rating of 2616 (FIDE category 15). In August 2008, there was a second successive victory in the Staunton Memorial. Adams finished on 8/11, ahead of Loek van Wely (7½/11) and Jan Smeets (7/11). He followed this with a share of second place at the 4th EU Individual Open Chess Championship in Liverpool, joining Viktor Láznička and Nigel Short on 7½/10 (after winner Jan Werle, 8/10).

After topping a strong open tournament in Gibraltar in 2010, he won the 2010 British Chess Championship, held in Canterbury, with an undefeated score of 9.5/11 and shared second place at the Chicago Open.

Further successes followed in 2011, with a share of first place at the Philadelphia World Open and a clear win at the British Championship in Sheffield. Adams finished outright first at the Los Angeles Metropolitan International and the European Team Championship and was awarded the gold medal for his performance on board one.

In 2012, he shared first place with Nigel Short at the Bunratty International and finished with a share of third place at the London Chess Classic, equal with Hikaru Nakamura and ahead of the world champion Viswanathan Anand and world number two ranked player Levon Aronian.

In the 2013 Alekhine Memorial tournament, held from 20 April to 1 May, Adams finished fourth, with +2−2=5. In March 2013, he came first in the 20th Bunratty Masters tournament.

At the Dortmund Sparkassen Chess Meeting in July–August 2013, Adams scored possibly the best result of his career, with a rating performance of 2925. He won the tournament with five wins and four draws (7/9), ahead of a field of 9 other grandmasters whose ratings averaged over 2705, including Fabiano Caruana (2796) and Vladimir Kramnik (2784).

In October of that year, the sixth Grand Slam Chess Masters final was held in Bilbao as a double round-robin with four players. Adams' opponents were Levon Aronian, Maxime Vachier-Lagrave and Shakhriyar Mamedyarov. Adams finished second behind Aronian, scoring +2−1=3 or 9 points according to the "football scoring system" traditionally used in the Grand Slam.

2014 included two notable results: a silver medal for his performance on board 1 at the Tromsø Olympiad and a share of first place at the London Chess Classic Blitz tournament (with Nakamura and Kramnik).

In 2023, Adams played his first World Senior Chess Championship and was the winner in the Over-50 category at Terrasini in Italy.

Currently in his 50's, Adams remains one of the top English chess-players and was rated among the top 100 chess players of the world.

== Hydra match ==
In June 2005, Adams took on the chess supercomputer Hydra in a six-game match in London, England, with a prize of $10,000 for each draw and $25,000 for each win. Hydra, housed in Abu Dhabi at the time of the match, consisted of 64 PCs, each running 3.06 GHz Intel Xeon processors. Its designers said that it could, under optimal conditions, analyse up to 200 million positions a second and, in the endgame, calculate up to 40 moves ahead. Adams lost the match, drawing only the second game. The final score was Hydra 5½, Adams ½, with Adams only receiving $10,000 of the $145,000 prize fund.

== Personal life ==
Adams lives in Somerset with his wife, actress Tara MacGowran. His nickname is "Mickey".

He was educated at Truro School.
