= Ferdinand Hellers =

Swedish chess grandmaster (born 1969)

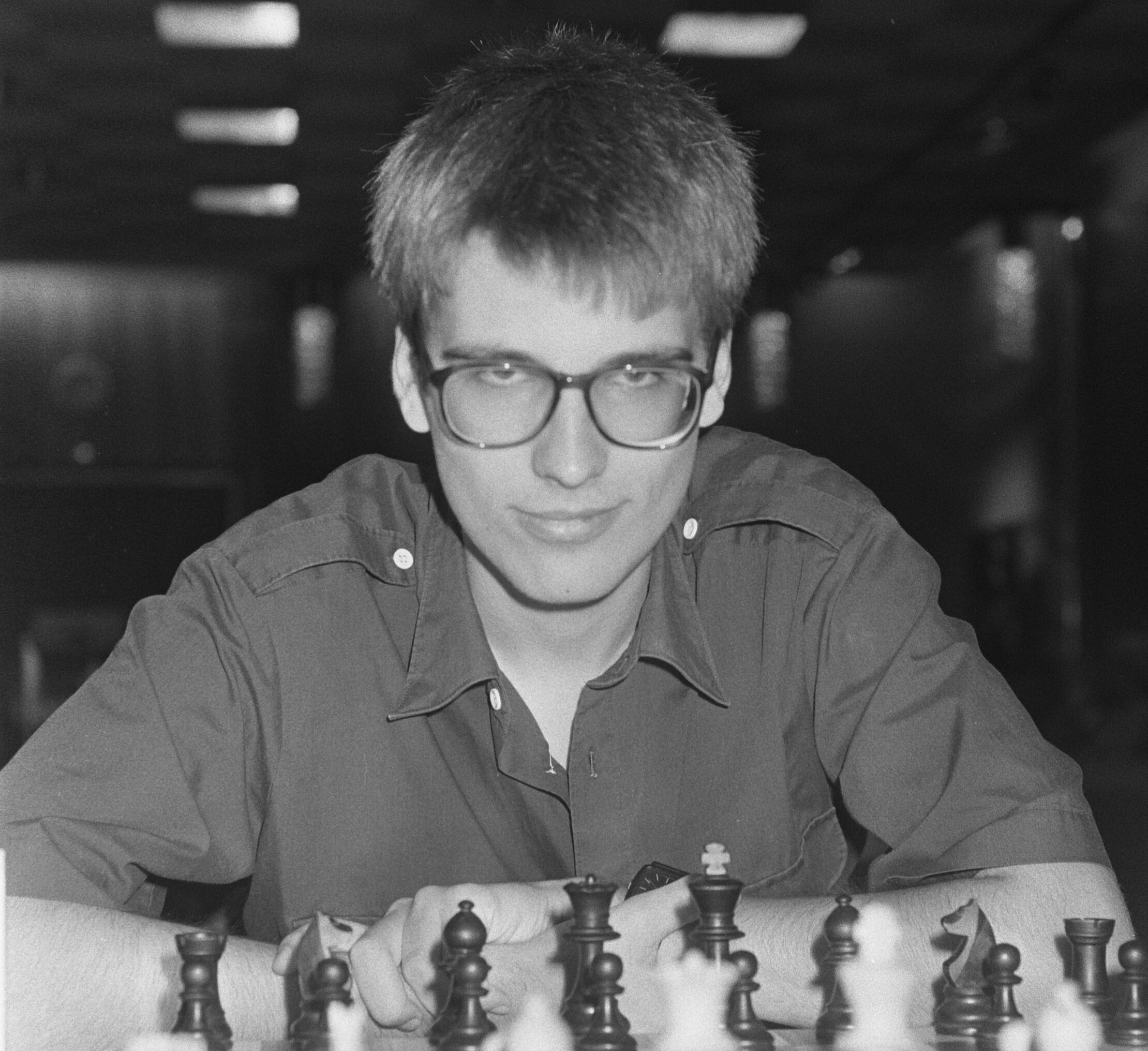

Personal information
- Born: January 28, 1969 (age 57) Stockholm, Sweden

Chess career
- Country: Sweden
- Title: Grandmaster (1988)
- FIDE rating: 2581 (July 2026)
- Peak rating: 2605 (January 1998)
- Peak ranking: No. 47 (January 1989)

Ferdinand Hellers is a Swedish chess grandmaster. He was one of Sweden's leading players in the 1990s.

== Chess career ==
He served as Viswanathan Anand's first second during his match against Alexei Dreev in Chennai 1991. He continued working for Anand during his match against Garry Kasparov.

He won the TePe Sigeman & Co chess tournament in 1993, 1994, and 1997.
