= Jan Timman =

Dutch chess grandmaster (1951–2026)

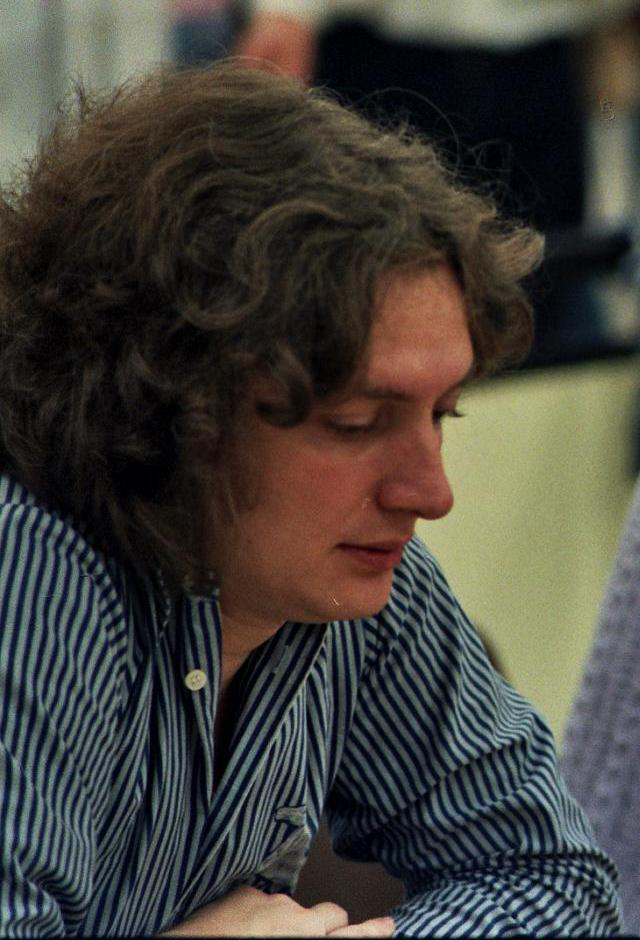
- Timman in 1984

Personal information
- Born: Jan Hendrik Timman; 14 December 1951 Amsterdam, Netherlands
- Died: 18 February 2026 (aged 74) Arnhem, Netherlands

Chess career
- Country: Netherlands
- Title: Grandmaster (1974)
- Peak rating: 2680 (January 1990)
- Peak ranking: No. 2 (January 1982)

Jan Hendrik Timman (14 December 1951 – 18 February 2026) was a Dutch chess grandmaster who was one of the world's leading players from the late 1970s to the early 1990s. At the peak of his career, he was considered to be the best non-Soviet player and was known as "The Best of the West". He won the Dutch Chess Championship nine times and was a Candidate for the World Chess Championship several times. He lost the title match of the 1993 FIDE World Championship against Anatoly Karpov.

== Early career ==
Jan Timman was born on 14 December 1951 in Amsterdam. He was the son of mathematics professor Reinier Timman and his wife Anneke, who as a schoolgirl was a mathematics student of former world champion Max Euwe. His older brother, Ton (1948–2014), held the chess title of FIDE Master. Jan Timman was already an outstanding prospect in his early teens, and at Jerusalem 1967 played in the World Junior Championship, aged fifteen, finishing third.

Timman received the International Master title in 1971, and in 1974 attained Grandmaster status, making him the Netherlands' third after Max Euwe and Jan Hein Donner. In the same year he won the Dutch Championship for the first time. He was to win it again on many more occasions through 1996. His first notable international success was at Hastings 1973–74, where he shared victory with Tal, Kuzmin, and Szabó. A string of victories quickly followed at Sombor 1974 (with Boris Gulko), Netanya 1975, Reykjavík 1976 (with Fridrik Olafsson), Amsterdam IBM 1978, Nikšić 1978, and Bled/Portorož 1979.

== Tournament successes ==
By 1982 Timman was ranked second in the world, behind only Anatoly Karpov. In the 1980s he won a number of very strong tournaments, including Amsterdam IBM in 1981, Wijk aan Zee in 1981 and 1985, Linares in 1988, the 1989 Euwe Memorial, and the 1989 World Cup tournament in Rotterdam. Other major successes included Las Palmas 1981, Mar del Plata 1982, Bugojno 1984, and Sarajevo 1984. One of his notable later successes was the 2nd Immopar Rapid Tournament in 1991, a weekend event which attracted a huge amount of prize money. In this knock-out format tournament he defeated Gata Kamsky 1½–½, Karpov 2–0, Viswanathan Anand 1½–½, and finally the World Champion Garry Kasparov 1½–½ to win the first prize of approximately 75,000 USD.

== World Championship Candidate ==
Timman's world championship career began at the zonal tournaments at Forssa/Helsinki 1972 and Reykjavík 1975. He failed to qualify for the next stage on both occasions. However his win at Amsterdam 1978 took him to his first interzonal tournament at Rio de Janeiro, where he failed to progress further. He finished in the middle of the field at the 1982 Las Palmas Interzonal, but won the Taxco 1985 Interzonal convincingly to qualify for the Candidates Matches for the first time. However, he lost in the first round to Artur Yusupov in 1986. In the next cycle, after winning the 1987 Tilburg Interzonal he defeated Valery Salov, Lajos Portisch, and Jonathan Speelman, but lost in the final to Anatoly Karpov in 1990. He reached the final round once again in 1993, having defeated Robert Hübner, Viktor Korchnoi, and Yusupov, but lost this time to Nigel Short. However, after Short and Garry Kasparov played their World Championship match outside of the auspices of the sport's governing body FIDE, Timman was invited to compete against Karpov for the FIDE version of the world title. He lost the match by 12½ points to 8½.

== Olympiad career ==
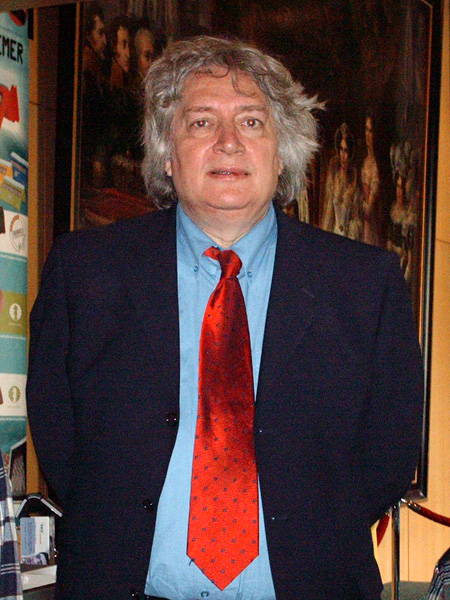
Timman at The Hague in 2007

Timman represented the Netherlands in 13 Chess Olympiads from 1972 to 2004, playing on the top board on 11 occasions. In 1976 he won the gold medal for the best individual performance on that board.

== Later career ==
Timman continued to play actively. In 2004 he participated in a rapid tournament in Reykjavík and was equal second at Amsterdam. He played in the gold medal-winning Dutch team at the European Team Chess Championships in Gothenburg in 2005, alongside Loek van Wely, Ivan Sokolov, Sergei Tiviakov, and Erik van den Doel. In 2006 he won the Sigeman Tournament in Malmö, Sweden and was second in the Howard Staunton Memorial in London.

== Personal life and death ==
Timman married twice, and had a son and a daughter, Arthur and Dehlia, from his first marriage to a Dutch woman of Suriname origin. His daughter Dehlia has been politically active with the Democraten 66 party. Timman himself voted for the Labour Party.

Timman died on 18 February 2026, at the age of 74, after being "seriously ill" for some time.

== Writings ==
Timman was one of the chief editors of the magazine New In Chess. His book The Art of Chess Analysis (1980) is widely considered one of the modern classics of chess literature.

Timman's Titans won the 2017 ECF Book of the Year award.

Other books authored by Timman include Studies and Games (1996); Fischer, World Champion! (2002), an account of the 1972 World Championship; Power Chess with Pieces: The Ultimate Guide to the Bishops Pair & Strong Knights (2004); Botvinnik's Secret Games (2006); On the Attack: The Art of Attacking Chess According to the Modern Masters (2006); Curaçao 1962: The Battle of Minds That Shook the Chess World (2007), which covers the 1962 Candidates Tournament; and The Art of the Endgame (2023).

Edward Winter, commenting on the book Chess the Adventurous Way: Timman's Selected Games (1996), wrote, "[Timman] presents 80 of his games, annotated in characteristic brilliant style."

== Playing style ==
Timman liked to challenge opponents directly in the areas of their strengths. Yasser Seirawan describes a game where Timman had an over-the-board inspiration to opt for a complicated game—the kind that Timman knew Seirawan really enjoyed—in spite of having prepared an equalizing variation beforehand. Timman's fearlessness has caused him to lose a lot of games, but also makes him a feared competitor because nobody likes to lose from their favourite positions. Raymond Keene described Timman's playing style as that of "a fighter, in the mould of Emanuel Lasker".

He always adopted a wide and varied opening repertoire, playing an array of different systems as both White and Black. When he first reached the world class level in the 1970s, this was relatively unusual, with most elite grandmasters deploying a more narrowly focused range of openings, but it is now the norm.

=== Example game ===
Timman vs. Kasparov, Hilversum 1985

Position: c7 black queen, f7 black pawn, c6 black pawn, f6 black king, g6 black pawn, h6 black pawn, d5 white pawn, e5 black pawn, a4 black bishop, b4 white pawn, a3 black rook, b3 white bishop, c3 white queen, h3 white pawn, g2 white pawn, e1 white rook, g1 white king

Position after 36...dxe5

This game, played between Timman and Garry Kasparov in Hilversum on 17 December 1985, is a good example of Timman's style:

Timman vs. Kasparov, Hilversum 1985; Ruy Lopez, Zaitsev Variation
1.e4 e5 2.Nf3 Nc6 3.Bb5 a6 4.Ba4 Nf6 5.0-0 Be7 6.Re1 b5 7.Bb3 d6 8.c3 0-0 9.h3 Bb7 10.d4 Re8 11.Ng5 Rf8 12.Nf3 Re8 13.Nbd2 Bf8 14.a3 h6 15.Bc2 Nb8 16.b4 Nbd7 17.Bb2 g6 18.c4 exd4 19.cxb5 axb5 20.Nxd4 c6 21.a4 bxa4 22.Bxa4 Qb6 23.Nc2 Qc7 24.Bb3 Ba6 25.Rc1 Bg7 26.Ne3 Bb5 27.Nd5 Nxd5 28.Bxg7 Kxg7 29.exd5 Ne5 30.Ne4 Nd3 31.Qd2 Ra3 32.Nf6 Rxe1+ 33.Rxe1 Kxf6 34.Qc3+ Ne5 35.f4 Ba4 36.fxe5 dxe5 (see diagram; at this point, Timman finds a game-ending combination) 37.d6 Qxd6 38.Qf3+ Ke7 39.Qxf7+ Kd8 40.Rd1 Ra1 41.Qf6+ (Kasparov cannot hang on to his queen) 1–0
