= Classical World Chess Championship 1995 =

Chess match between Garry Kasparov and Viswanathan Anand

	Defending champion	Challenger
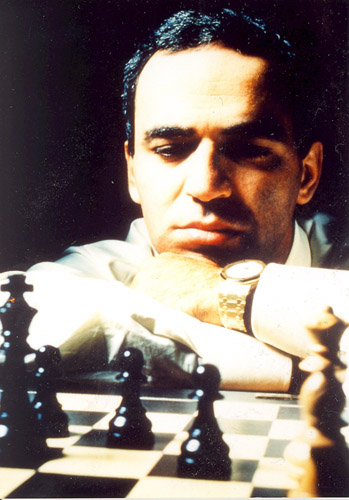
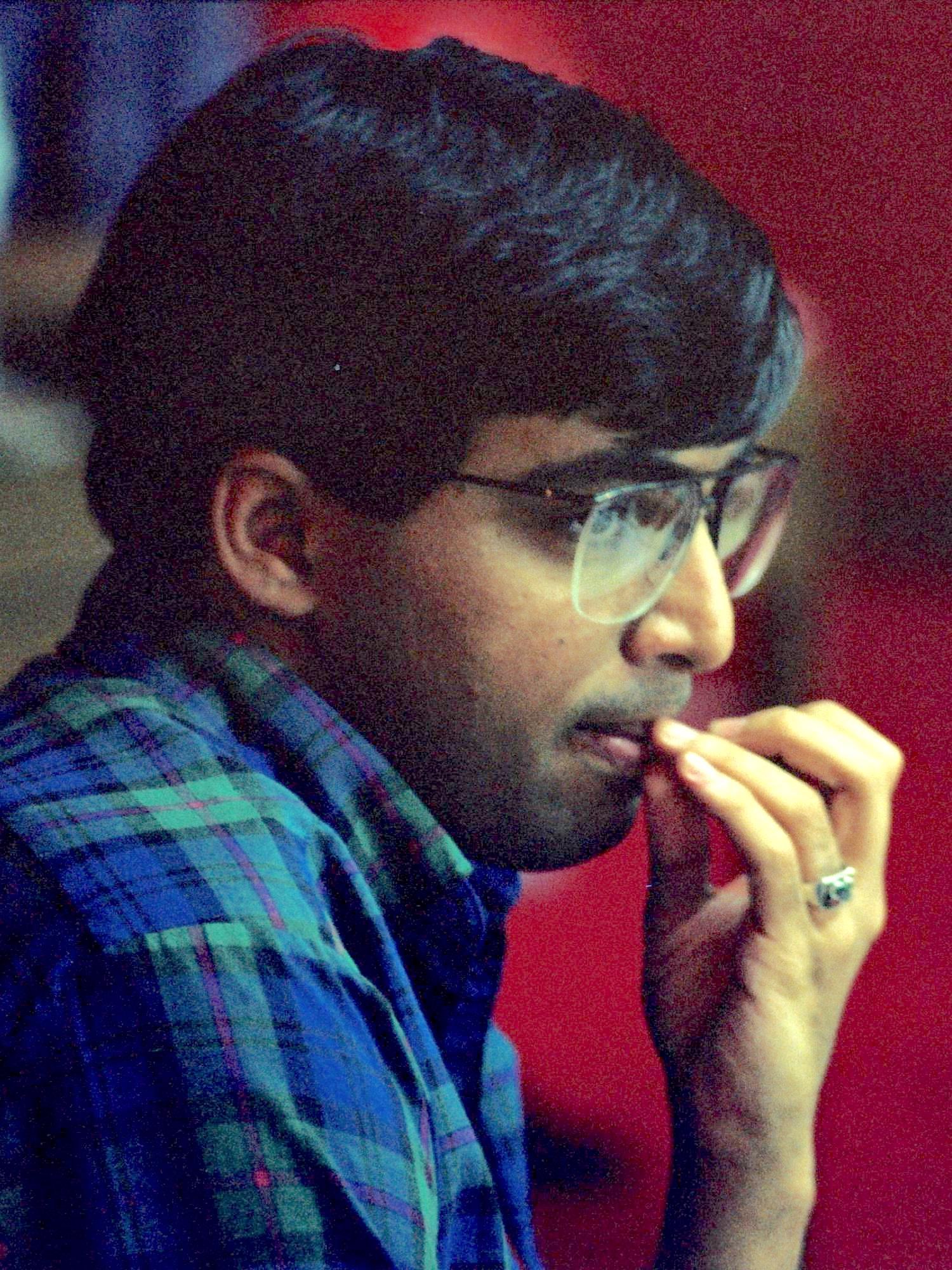
	Garry Kasparov	Viswanathan Anand
	(Russia) Garry Kasparov	(India) Viswanathan Anand
10½	Scores	7½
	Born 13 April 1963; 32 years old	Born 11 December 1969; 25 years old
	Winner of the 1993 PCA World Chess Championship	Winner of the 1994-95 Candidates Tournament
	Rating: 2805 (World No. 1)	Rating: 2715 (World No. 4)

The Classical World Chess Championship 1995, known at the time as the PCA World Chess Championship 1995, was held from September 10, 1995, to October 16, 1995, on the 107th floor of the South Tower of the World Trade Center in New York City. Garry Kasparov, the defending champion, played Viswanathan Anand, the challenger, in a twenty-game match. Kasparov won the match after eighteen games with four wins, one loss, and thirteen draws.

== Background ==
In 1993, the reigning FIDE World Chess Champion, Garry Kasparov decided to split from FIDE because he felt the organisation was corrupt, and formed a rival organisation, the PCA (Professional Chess Association). In response, FIDE stripped Kasparov of his status and organised an event to determine a new champion — this event was won by Anatoly Karpov.

Kasparov claimed that, as he had not been defeated by a challenger to his title in a match, and in fact had defeated the rightful challenger (Nigel Short in 1993), that he was still the reigning world champion. Thus, for the first time since the inaugural World Championship in 1886, there were two rival World Chess Championships.

The PCA ran a world championship cycle similar in format to that in use by FIDE at the time. It was to be the only full championship cycle run under the auspices of the PCA.

== 1993 Qualifying tournament ==
The PCA held a qualifying tournament and Candidates matches in 1993–1995. A number of leading players did not participate, most notably FIDE World Champion Anatoly Karpov. The events were held at a similar time as the FIDE World Chess Championship 1996, with many of the same players playing in both.

The Qualifying tournament in Groningen in December 1993 had 54 players participating in an 11-round Swiss system tournament, with the top seven qualifying for the Candidates Tournament.

1993 PCA Qualifying Tournament
		Rating	1	2	3	4	5	6	7	8	9	10	11	Total
1	Michael Adams (England)	2635	=33	+39	+45	=23	-5	+7	=4	+11	=2	+6	=3	7½
2	Viswanathan Anand (India)	2725	+52	=5	=7	+30	+22	+20	=8	=6	=1	=3	=4	7½
3	Gata Kamsky (United States)	2645	=13	=30	=33	+19	+17	=4	=5	=16	+23	=2	=1	7
4	Vladimir Kramnik (Russia)	2710	+40	=20	-22	+35	+25	=3	=1	=8	+24	=9	=2	7
5	Sergei Tiviakov (Russia)	2635	+41	=2	=34	+29	+1	=22	=3	=20	-6	+25	=8	7
6	Boris Gulko (United States)	2635	=29	=37	+49	=20	+10	=8	+22	=2	+5	-1	=11	7
7	Oleg Romanishin (Ukraine)	2615	+53	=24	=2	=25	=9	-1	+28	=10	=26	+22	+20	7
8	Alexei Shirov (Latvia)	2685	+11	+36	=23	-22	+32	=6	=2	=4	=12	=16	=5	6½
9	Sergey Dolmatov (Russia)	2630	=18	=33	=13	+12	=7	=23	=27	=21	+42	=4	=16	6½
10	Eric Lobron (Germany)	2575	=19	=38	=11	+36	-6	+17	=44	=7	=15	=14	+25	6½
11	Ivan Sokolov (Bosnia and Herzegovina)	2610	-8	=28	=10	+41	+37	=24	=31	-1	+44	+26	=6	6½
12	Jeroen Piket (Netherlands)	2590	+25	-22	=35	-9	+47	+15	=24	+34	=8	=20	=18	6½
13	Robert Hübner (Germany)	2605	=3	=34	=9	=38	=15	=25	=32	+29	=14	=24	+22	6½
14	Julio Granda (Peru)	2605	=21	-45	=39	+18	=30	=44	+36	=27	=13	=10	+23	6½
15	Rafael Vaganian (Armenia)	2615	=54	=26	=21	=44	=13	-12	+17	+30	=10	=23	+42	6½
16	Predrag Nikolić (Bosnia and Herzegovina)	2625	+48	-23	+51	=24	+34	=31	=20	=3	=22	=8	=9	6½
17	Judit Polgár (Hungary)	2630	=37	=29	+41	=32	-3	-10	-15	+51	+46	+31	+27	6½
18	Lembit Oll (Estonia)	2595	=9	=35	-25	-14	=53	=45	+52	+36	+38	+21	=12	6½
19	Jaan Ehlvest (Estonia)	2620	=10	=51	=37	-3	+48	-29	+35	-26	+41	+32	+24	6½
20	Joel Benjamin (United States)	2620	+50	=4	+31	=6	+23	-2	=16	=5	=21	=12	-7	6
21	Veselin Topalov (Bulgaria)	2670	=14	=49	=15	=40	=29	=27	+46	=9	=20	-18	+33	6
22	Alexander Beliavsky (Ukraine)	2635	+42	+12	+4	+8	-2	=5	-6	=23	=16	-7	-13	5½
23	Evgeny Bareev (Russia)	2660	+46	+16	=8	=1	-20	=9	+29	=22	-3	=15	-14	5½
24	Gregory Kaidanov (United States)	2640	+43	=7	=30	=16	=27	=11	=12	+31	-4	=13	-19	5½
25	Julian Hodgson (England)	2625	-12	+54	+18	=7	-4	=13	=30	+39	+27	-5	-10	5½
26	Boris Alterman (Israel)	2585	=35	=15	-32	+47	=40	-28	+37	+19	=7	-11	=31	5½
27	Alexey Vyzmanavin (Russia)	2605	=31	=44	=36	+45	=24	=21	=9	=14	-25	+34	-17	5½
28	Ljubomir Ljubojević (Yugoslavia)	2595	-36	=11	=46	+43	-31	+26	-7	-38	=49	+48	+44	5½
29	Leonid Yudasin (Israel)	2605	=6	=17	+38	-5	=21	+19	-23	-13	=39	=36	=43	5
30	Gregory Serper (Uzbekistan)	2575	+32	=3	=24	-2	=14	=40	=25	-15	-35	+45	=34	5
31	Ilya Smirin (Israel)	2640	=27	+47	-20	=37	+28	=16	=11	-24	=32	-17	=26	5
32	Alexander Chernin (Hungary)	2615	-30	+42	+26	=17	-8	=39	=13	=44	=31	-19	=38	5
33	Vladimir Tukmakov (Ukraine)	2600	=1	=9	=3	-34	=38	=35	=49	=41	=40	+46	-21	5
34	Vladimir Malaniuk (Ukraine)	2635	=39	=13	=5	+33	-16	=46	=42	-12	+48	-27	=30	5
35	Viktor Korchnoi (Switzerland)	2625	=26	=18	=12	-4	=54	=33	-19	=43	+30	=39	=37	5
36	Zurab Azmaiparashvili (Georgia)	2630	+28	-8	=27	-10	+51	=42	-14	-18	+50	=29	=40	5
37	Curt Hansen (Denmark)	2590	=17	=6	=19	=31	-11	=38	-26	=49	=47	+52	=35	5
38	Miguel Illescas (Spain)	2625	=51	=10	-21	=13	=33	=37	=41	+28	-18	=40	=32	5
39	Vladimir Akopian (Armenia)	2600	=34	-1	=14	+52	=44	=32	=40	-25	=29	=35	=41	5
40	Zoltán Ribli (Hungary)	2610	-4	+50	=44	=21	=26	=30	=39	-42	=33	=38	=36	5
41	Eduardas Rozentalis (Lithuania)	2600	-5	+52	-17	-11	=43	+54	=38	=33	-19	+53	=39	5
42	Alex Yermolinsky (United States)	2605	-22	-32	+50	=48	+45	=36	=34	+40	-9	=44	-15	5
43	Lev Polugaevsky (Russia)	2605	-24	=53	=48	-28	=41	=50	=51	=35	=45	+49	=29	5
44	Alexander Khalifman (Russia)	2645	=47	=27	=40	=15	=39	=14	=10	=32	-11	=42	-28	4½
45	Kiril Georgiev (Bulgaria)	2660	=49	+14	-1	-27	-42	=18	=53	=48	=33	-30	+54	4½
46	Mikhail Gurevich (Belgium)	2605	-23	=48	=28	=51	+49	=34	-21	+50	-17	-33	=47	4½
47	Christopher Lutz (Germany)	2605	=44	-31	=54	-26	-12	+53	-48	+52	=37	=50	=46	4½
48	Loek van Wely (Netherlands)	2585	-16	=46	=43	=42	-19	=49	+47	=45	-34	-28	=53	4
49	Jóhann Hjartarson (Iceland)	2605	=45	=21	-6	=54	-46	=48	=33	=37	=28	-43	=52	4
50	Patrick Wolff (United States)	2585	-20	-40	-42	+53	=52	=43	+54	-46	-36	=47	=51	4
51	Vadim Ruban (Russia)	2590	=38	=19	-16	=46	-36	=52	=43	-17	-53	=54	=50	3½
52	Simen Agdestein (Norway)	2610	-2	-41	+53	-39	=50	=51	-18	-47	+54	-37	=49	3½
53	Friso Nijboer (Netherlands)	2555	-7	=43	-52	-50	=18	-47	=45	=54	+51	-41	=48	3½
54	Zsuzsa Polgár (Hungary)	2545	=15	-25	=47	=49	=35	-41	-50	=53	-52	=51	-45	3

== 1994–95 Candidates Tournament ==
The top seven from the Qualifying tournament were joined by Nigel Short, the loser of the 1993 PCA championship match against Kasparov.

The first round of Candidates matches were best of eight games, the semifinals were best of 10, and the final was best of 12. If the scores were tied, sets of two rapid chess games were played as tie breakers, until one player had a lead.

The quarterfinal matches were held at the Trump Tower in New York City in June 1994 and opened by Donald Trump. The semifinals were played in Linares in September 1994, and the final in Las Palmas in March 1995.

Quarterfinals
(United States) Gata Kamsky	4½
(Russia) Vladimir Kramnik	1½
(England) Nigel Short	6½
(United States) Boris Gulko	5½
(England) Michael Adams	7½
(Russia) Sergei Tiviakov	6½
(India) Viswanathan Anand	5
(Ukraine) Oleg Romanishin	2

Semifinals
(United States) Gata Kamsky	5½
(England) Nigel Short	1½
(England) Michael Adams	1½
(India) Viswanathan Anand	5½

Final
(United States) Gata Kamsky	4½
(India) Viswanathan Anand	6½

== 1995 Championship match ==
The final was played at the World Trade Center, on the 107th floor of the South Tower.

The first player to reach 10½ points would be the winner.

PCA World Chess Championship Match 1995
	Rating (change)	1	2	3	4	5	6	7	8	9	10	11	12	13	14	15	16	17	18	Total
Viswanathan Anand (India)	2725 (+13)	½	½	½	½	½	½	½	½	1	0	0	½	0	0	½	½	½	½	7½
Garry Kasparov (Russia)	2795 (-13)	½	½	½	½	½	½	½	½	0	1	1	½	1	1	½	½	½	½	10½

The match began with eight consecutive draws, a record for the World Chess Championship until the 2018 Carlsen–Caruana match. In game 9 Anand, with white, broke through Kasparov's Sicilian Scheveningen defence to win. Kasparov hit back immediately in game 10, with a novelty in the Ruy Lopez Open Defence.

Game 11 was arguably the turning point in the match. Kasparov sprung a major surprise by playing the Sicilian Dragon with black – a once-popular defence which at the time was only played at the top level by a few specialists. Anand missed a comparatively simple combination and lost. After a draw in game 12, Anand again played weakly against the Dragon in game 13, losing again with white to go two points down.

When Anand lost game 14, Kasparov had a commanding 8½-5½ lead and the match was effectively over. The players drew their remaining games.
