= Valery Salov =

Russian chess grandmaster (born 1964)

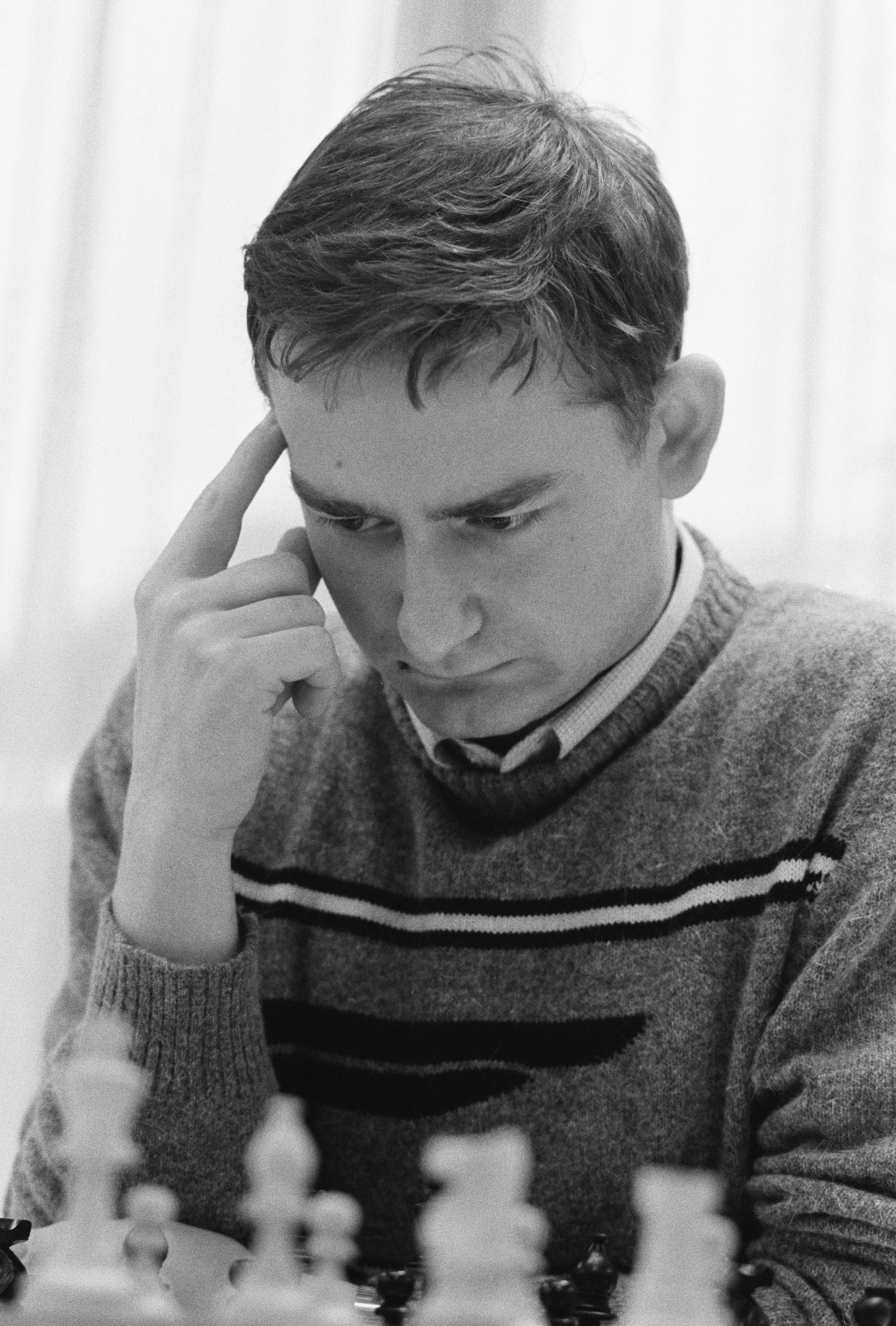
- Salov in 1989

Personal information
- Born: Valery Borisovich Salov; 26 May 1964 (age 62) Wrocław, Poland

Chess career
- Country: Soviet Union (until 1991); Russia (since 1991)
- Title: Grandmaster (1986)
- FIDE rating: 2644 (November 2026)
- Peak rating: 2715 (January 1995)
- Peak ranking: No. 3 (January 1995)

Valery Borisovich Salov (Russian: Валерий Борисович Салов; born 26 May 1964) is a Russian chess grandmaster who was ranked third in the world in 1995.

== Competitive chess career ==
Salov was born on 26 May 1964 in Wrocław, Poland. He was awarded the International Master title in 1984 and the Grandmaster title in 1986. He was the World under-17 Champion in 1980 and the European Junior Champion in 1983–84. He shared first place with Alexander Beliavsky in the 1987 USSR Championship, but he lost the tiebreaker match with Beliavsky (+0−2=2). At the 1988 USSR Championship he finished tied for third with Artur Yusupov, behind Anatoly Karpov and Garry Kasparov.

He qualified twice for the Candidates Tournament for the World Chess Championship. In the 1988 Candidates Tournament for the 1990 Classical Chess World Championship he was defeated in the round of 16 (the first match) by Jan Timman (+0−1=5). In the Candidates Tournament for the 1996 FIDE World Chess Championship he won his first two matches against Alexander Khalifman (+4−0=2) and Jan Timman (+2−1=5) to reach the third round (Candidates final), where he was defeated by Gata Kamsky (+0−4=3).

In 1994, he won both the 16-player Tilburg knockout event and the thematic Polugaevsky 60th Birthday Tournament in Buenos Aires, defeating Karpov with both colors in the latter.

A resident of Spain, he tied for 3rd to 5th place in the Category 19 strength Dos Hermanas International Tournament in 1997.

He has not played any FIDE-rated tournaments since January 2000.

== Activities since retirement ==
In 2009, at the Chigorin Chess Club in St. Petersburg, Salov delivered lectures in which he took up the role of a current "chess outsider" in order to critique the previous decade in chess. In particular, he discussed the problems raised by the increasing role of computers in chess opening preparation and the prospects for dealing with these problems by means of a shift from traditional chess to Fischer Random Chess (also called Chess960). He also discussed his views on several events in Russian politics.

In a long May 2015 interview with Chess-News, he touched on a number of subjects, in particular, how for various reasons he was forced out of competitive chess (due to a lack of invitations), that the Kasparov–Karpov matches were a Kabbalistic "ritual" of Freemasonry, that the Kasparov–Anand match at the World Trade Center was related to the September 11 terrorist attacks in the United States, and other various theories. He is currently involved with political economy at universities near Madrid.
