= Sanghi Nagar =

- neighbourhood
- Location Telangana, India Sanghi Nagar (Telangana) Sanghi Nagar (India)
- Coordinates: 17°16′00″N 78°40′35″E
- Country: India
- State: Telangana
- District: Hyderabad
- Metro: Hyderabad

Government
  - Body: GHMC

Languages
  - Official: Telugu
- Time zone: UTC+5:30 (IST)
- PIN: 501511
- Lok Sabha constituency: Nalgonda Lok Sabha constituency
- Vidhan Sabha constituency: Malakpet Assembly constituency
- Planning agency: GHMC
- Civic agency: GHMC

Sanghi Nagar is suburb of Hyderabad, India.

Sanghi Nagar is an industrial complex set up by the Sanghi Group of Industries. The temple complex has been built around the heavenly temple over a hill. Industries belonging to the sanghi group surround the temple as though it is being blessed by the Almighty. The temple is a treat to watch especially at night. It is very close to the famous Ramoji film city. Sanghi nagar is around 25 km away from Dilsukh Nagar, Hyderabad.

Apart from the group's manufacturing facilities, Sanghi Nagar contains a full-fledged housing complex and health care facilities for its employees. They include Captive Power plants, Communication facilities, Higher Secondary School, Excellent Accommodation facilities for all grades of staff & labour, Hospital, Food Marts, Entertainment facilities, post office, Cable and internet access etc.

Sanghi Nagar STD Code is 08415.

Similar facilities and amenities exist at the other Sanghi township at Sanghipuram, Gujarat, where the group operates a large Lignite based cement plant under Sanghi Industries Ltd.

== Transport ==
TSRTC runs buses from Hyderabad City, they are

- Route No. : 290S & 205K Secunderabad - Sanghi Nagar/Ramoji Film City

Suburbs covered are Lalaguda, Tarnaka, Uppal Ring Road, Kamineni Hospitals, L. B. Nagar, Sanghi Nagar)

- Route No. : 202u, 204u from Women's college - Sanghi Nagar

Suburbs covered are Women's college, Chaderghat, Malakpet, Dilsukhnagar, LB Nagar, Sanghi Nagar)

== See also ==
- Sanghi Temple
