= Gata Kamsky =

American chess grandmaster (born 1974)

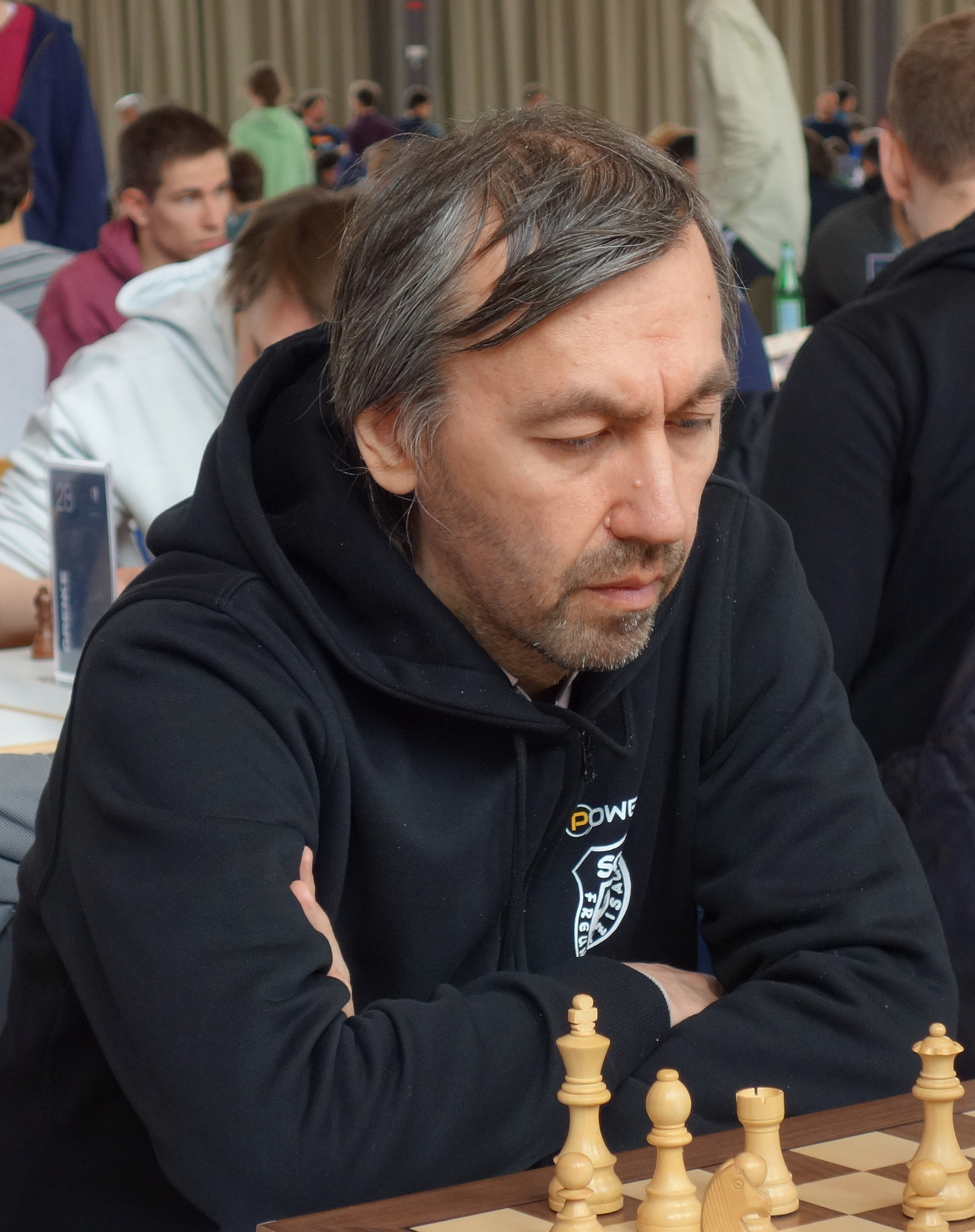
- Kamsky in 2024

Personal information
- Born: Gataulla Rustemovich Sabirov; June 2, 1974 (age 52) Novokuznetsk, Russian SFSR, Soviet Union

Chess career
- Country: Soviet Union (until 1991); United States (1991–2025); France (since 2025)
- Title: Grandmaster (1990)
- FIDE rating: 2592 (October 2026)
- Peak rating: 2763 (July 2013)
- Peak ranking: No. 4 (July 1995)

Gata Rustemovich Kamsky (Tatar: Гата Камский; Russian: Гата Камский; born June 2, 1974) is an American-French chess grandmaster and a five-time U.S. champion.

Kamsky reached the final of the FIDE World Chess Championship 1996 at the age of 22, and reached a ranking of fourth in the world rankings in 1995. He played almost no FIDE-rated games between 1997 and late 2004.

Kamsky won the Chess World Cup 2007. This earned him a Candidates Match against Veselin Topalov, which he lost. Kamsky also competed in the Candidates Tournament in 2011, losing to Boris Gelfand.

== Early career ==
Kamsky was born in Novokuznetsk in Russia, in a Tatar family. Gata's last name, Kamsky, is derived from the stage nickname of his grandfather Gataullah "Kamsky" Sabirov, the founder of the Tatar Drama Theater in Kazan.

At age 12, he defeated veteran Grandmaster Mark Taimanov in a tournament game. He also earned his National Master title in that year. He won the Soviet under-20 championship in 1987 and 1988.

In 1989, he moved to the United States with his father Röstäm (also spelled Rustam), a former boxer who dominated Gata, made him study chess almost exclusively, and acted as his coach and manager. Allen Kaufman, then Executive Director of the American Chess Foundation, helped arrange for their support after their move. Businessman James Cayne provided financial support to the Kamskys.

In 1989, Gata Kamsky won a tournament in New York to earn the right to challenge Garry Kasparov to a two-game match; he lost that match later that year 0–2. In 1990, while aged 16 and still untitled, he played in the 64-player Interzonal tournament in Manila, the first step toward the World Chess Championship. He finished with 5½ / 13.

In 1990, FIDE awarded Kamsky the grandmaster title. In 1991, he won the U.S. Championship. Kamsky also did well at other prestigious chess tournaments, winning the Las Palmas tournament in 1994.

== World Championship Candidate (1993–96) ==
In 1993, the rival organisations FIDE and PCA each held Interzonal tournaments. Kamsky played in both, and in both cases qualified for the respective Candidates Tournaments. The Candidates tournaments were largely dominated by Kamsky and Viswanathan Anand.

In the first round of the 1994–95 FIDE Candidates matches, Kamsky beat Paul van der Sterren (+3=3−1). Kamsky's second round (Candidates semifinal) match against Anand, held in July and August 1994 in Sanghi Nagar, India, was more dramatic. After draws in the first two games, Anand won the next two games to take an imposing 3–1 lead. Game 5 was drawn. Kamsky then scored 2½–½ in the remaining three games to tie the match 4–4 (+2=4−2), then won the two rapid chess playoff games to win the match. In the third round (Candidates final), held in Sanghi Nagar in February 1995, Kamsky routed Valery Salov 5½–1½ (+4=3−0).

In the 1994–95 PCA Candidates matches, Kamsky beat Vladimir Kramnik in the quarter-finals in New York in June, 1994. In September, 1994 Kamsky beat Nigel Short in the semifinals in Linares, Spain. In the March 1995 final against Anand in Las Palmas, the FIDE result was reversed, with Kamsky losing (+1=7−3).

In the September 1994 match against Short, there was a highly publicized confrontation between Kamsky's father, Rustam Kamsky, and Short.

In 1996, Kamsky played a 20-game match against Anatoly Karpov for the FIDE World Chess Championship 1996 title at Elista in Kalmykia, losing 7½–10½ (+3=9−6).

== Inactivity (1996–2004) ==
After losing the match to Karpov, Kamsky gave up professional chess. He graduated from Brooklyn College with a B.A. in 1999. He then attended and graduated from law school at Touro Law Center in New York.

Kamsky's next rated games after his loss to Karpov were in 1999, when he returned to play in the FIDE Knockout World Championship event in Las Vegas, where he played a first-round, two-game match against the eventual tournament winner, Alexander Khalifman. Kamsky won the first game, lost the second game, and then lost the rapid play-off games.

== Comeback (2004 onward) ==
Kamsky then again retired from the world of chess, this time for five years. In March 2004 ChessBase reported that according to Sam Sloan Kamsky was seeking to become President of FIDE.

Kamsky's next game in public was not until June 15, 2004, when he participated in the 106th New York Masters, playing four games in a day with a time control of 30 minutes for all his moves. His two wins and two draws were enough for him to tie for first place with four others. He subsequently played in several other editions of the weekly event with mixed success, before returning to regular chess in the 2005 U.S. Championship held in November–December 2004 where he scored a respectable but unspectacular 5½–3½. He was rated number 19 in the world on the April 2005 FIDE Elo rating list, at 2700. He retained this rating on the July 2005 list, but moved up to number 18, after a good unbeaten result at the 2005 HB Global Challenge tournament, held in Minneapolis in May, 2005.

He has since returned to international chess, most notably finishing second behind Veselin Topalov at the M-Tel Masters event. Soon after, Kamsky led the US team to the bronze medal at the 2006 Chess Olympiad in Turin. On July 4, 2006, he tied for first place with nine others at the Philadelphia World Open, then won the play-off, winning about $7,000. A number of successes in 2007 marked his return to the playing level he had before his retirement, hinting at the possibility of becoming again a challenger for the very top of the world's chess hierarchy.

Kamsky played in the FIDE Chess World Cup 2005, and qualified for the Candidates Tournament for the World Chess Championship 2007, in May–June 2007. He won his first round match against Étienne Bacrot (+3−0=1), but was eliminated when he lost his second round match to Boris Gelfand +0−2=3.

In November–December 2007, Kamsky participated in the Chess World Cup 2007. Seeded 11th, he won his first three rounds and then defeated Peter Svidler, former FIDE world champion Ruslan Ponomariov and future world number-one Magnus Carlsen to reach the finals. In the final he defeated Alexei Shirov (+1−0=3) to win the title, shocking many in the chess world.

Kamsky's victory earned him a match against world number-one Veselin Topalov in 2009 for the right to challenge for the World Chess Championship 2010 against world champion Viswanathan Anand. The match was held in Sofia, Bulgaria, in February 2009. Although Kamsky won game four to level the match 2–2, Topalov scored +2 in the final 3 games (including an exciting last round victory on the White side of the French Defense) to win the match 4½–2½.

Kamsky played board one for the United States in the 2008 Chess Olympiad, held in Dresden, Germany in November. The U.S. team captured the bronze medals.

Kamsky participated in the Chess World Cup 2009 but was upset in the third round by Wesley So.

In January 2010 Kamsky won the 52nd Reggio Emilia chess tournament (he came equal first with Zoltán Almási, defeating him in the last round, but had a better Buchholz tiebreak). In May 2010 he tied for 1st–3rd with Vladimir Kramnik and Shakhriyar Mamedyarov in the President's Cup in Baku.

He became U.S. Champion on May 25, 2010, after winning a rapid playoff game with second-place finisher Yury Shulman. This championship, Kamsky's second, came 19 years after he won his first U.S. championship.

In August 2010, Kamsky won clear first at the Open Grenke Rapid World Championship (Mainz Chess Classic), a Rapid Chess tournament, with 10/11, defeating world No. 5 and defending champion Levon Aronian, 2004 FIDE champion Rustam Kasimdzhanov, and Sergey Karjakin en route to the title ahead of Grischuk, Shirov and several other strong Grandmasters.

From August 23 through August 31, Kamsky participated in the Baku Open in Azerbaijan, where he was the top seed. He won his final three games to clinch clear first with 7½/9.

From April 13 through April 18, 2011, Kamsky participated in the United States Championship, where he was the top seed. He won the tournament for the second consecutive year, becoming the first player since Lev Alburt in 1985 to win consecutive U.S. Championships; the title was his third career United States Championship.

As a finalist of the 2010 world championship cycle, Kamsky was given direct entry to the eight player Candidates Tournament to determine the challenger for the World Chess Championship 2012. The candidates tournament began with best-of-four game match format in May 2011 in Kazan, with Kamsky facing Veselin Topalov in the quarterfinals. With a win on the Black side of the Gruenfeld defense in the second game, Kamsky held on to defeat the top-seeded Topalov 2½–1½ to advance to the semifinals. In the semifinals, he faced the 2009 Chess World Cup champion Boris Gelfand in a rematch of their 2007 Candidates tournament meeting won by Gelfand. After four games, the match was tied at 2–2, with rapid tiebreaks to decide the winner on May 16. In the rapid tiebreaks, Kamsky won game 3 with black to take a 2–1 lead and needed only a draw with white in the final rapid game to advance to the final. However, Gelfand won with black to force a blitz playoff, which he won 2–0 to eliminate Kamsky and reach the Candidates final.

In May 2012, Kamsky participated in the 2012 U.S. Championship, where he was seeded second behind defending champion Hikaru Nakamura. He scored 5/7 to qualify for the round-robin stage against Nakamura, 2006 champion Alexander Onischuk, and 2008 champion Yuri Shulman. In the round-robin stage, he drew Nakamura with black and then defeated Onischuk on the White side of the Ruy Lopez. In 2013 and 2014 he won the tournament, and the last title was his fifth career United States Championship. In 2016 he placed third at the Chigorin Memorial tournament in Saint Petersburg.

In 2025, Kamsky transferred to the French Chess Federation.

== Notable tournament victories ==
- Buffalo Open, 1989
- Tilburg, 1990
- World Open, 1991
- U.S. Championship, 1991
- Buenos Aires, 1993
- Las Palmas, 1994
- Dos Hermanas, 1995
- New York, 2006
- World Open, 2006
- Mashantucket, 2007
- Chess World Cup, Khanty-Mansiysk, 2007
- National Open, Las Vegas, 2008
- Reggio Emilia, 2010
- Philadelphia Open, 2010
- U.S. Championship, 2010
- Rapid World Championship, Mainz 2010
- Baku Open, 2010
- World Open, 2011
- U.S. Championship, 2011
- U.S. Championship, 2013
- Philadelphia Open, 2014
- U.S. Championship, 2014
- The 8th New York International, 2015
- Cappelle la Grande, 2016
- The 54th Biel Chess Festival Chess Triathlon, 2021

== World championship matches and qualifiers ==
- FIDE WCC Candidates Match 1994, Wijk aan Zee, Kamsky–van der Sterren (4½–2½)
- FIDE WCC Candidates Match 1994, Sanghi Nagar, Kamsky–Anand (6–4)
- PCA WCC Candidates Match 1994, New York, Kamsky–Kramnik (4½–1½)
- PCA WCC Candidates Match 1994, Linares, Kamsky–Short (5½–1½)
- FIDE WCC Candidates Match 1995, Sanghi Nagar, Kamsky–Salov (5½–1½)
- PCA WCC Candidates Match 1995, Las Palmas, Kamsky–Anand (4½–6½)
- FIDE World Chess Championship 1996, Elista, Kamsky–Karpov (7½–10½)
- FIDE WCC Knockout 1999 Second Round, Las Vegas, Kamsky–Khalifman (1½–2½)
- WCC Candidates Match 2007 Round 1, Elista, Kamsky–Bacrot (3½–½)
- WCC Candidates Match 2007 Round 2, Elista, Kamsky–Gelfand (1½–3½)
- Chess World Cup 2007 Quarterfinals, Khanty–Mansiysk, Kamsky–Ponomariov (1½–0½)
- Chess World Cup 2007 Semifinals, Khanty–Mansiysk, Kamsky–Carlsen (1½–0½)
- Chess World Cup 2007 Championship Match, Khanty–Mansiysk, Kamsky–Shirov (2½–1½)
- WCC Candidates Match 2009, Sofia, Kamsky–Topalov (2½–4½)
- WCC Candidates Match 2011 Quarterfinals, Kazan, Kamsky–Topalov (2½–1½)
- WCC Candidates Match 2011 Semifinals, Kazan, Kamsky–Gelfand [2–2 (2–4)]

== Notable games ==
Here, Kamsky as Black crushes Kramnik en route to winning the 1994 Candidates match:

Kramnik vs. Kamsky, 1994

Position: g1 black rook, h2 white pawn, d2 white queen, a2 white pawn, h3 white king, f3 white pawn, a3 white bishop, g4 white pawn, g5 black pawn, b5 black bishop, h6 black pawn, f6 white pawn, d6 black pawn, f7 black pawn, b7 black pawn, a7 black pawn, g8 black king, d8 black rook

Final position

Kramnik vs. Kamsky, World Championship Quarter-Finals Match, New York 1994
1. Nf3 Nf6 2. c4 e6 3. Nc3 Bb4 4. g3 0-0 5. Bg2 c5 6. 0-0 Nc6 7. d4 cxd4 8. Nxd4 Qe7 9. Nc2 White allows Black to ruin his pawn structure, and soon sacrifices one of his weak c-pawns. He hopes that his two bishops will give him sufficient compensation, but will find that he is unable to use them effectively. 9... Bxc3 10. bxc3 Rd8 11. Ba3 d6 12. Rb1 Qc7 13. Nd4 Nxd4 14. cxd4 Qxc4 15. Qd2 Qa6 16. Rb3 Rb8 17. e4 Bd7 18. Rf3 Trying to get play on the kingside, but Kamsky's pieces now overrun the queenside. 18... Ba4! Disdaining 18...Nxe4 19.Qf4 f5 20.g4 opening lines for White's pieces. 19. Re1 Rbc8 20. Bf1 Bb5 21. Bh3 Qa4 22. d5 Rc2 23. Qe3? exd5 White is in deep trouble. If now 24.exd5? Re8 wins. 24. e5 d4! 25. Qg5 Re2! Exploiting White's weak back rank. Now White sacrifices material for a fearsome-looking attack against g7, but Kamsky has calculated exactly. 26. exf6 Rxe1+ 27. Bf1 27.Kg2? Bf1+ 28.Kg1 Bxh3# 27... Rxf1+ 28. Kg2 Rg1+! 29. Kh3 If 29.Kxg1? Qd1+ 30.Kg2 Qf1# 29... Bd7+ 30. Kh4 g6 31. Qh6 d3+ 32. Rf4 If 32.Kg5? Qg4# 32... Qxf4+! 33. Qxf4 If 33.gxf4 Rg4+ 34.Kh3 Rg5+! 35.Kh4 Rh5+ wins the queen. 33... Rh1! 34. g4 h6! Now White's attack is over and Black's pawns join in attacking White's king, threatening ...g5+. 35. Kh3 If 35.Qxh6? Rxh2+ 35... g5! 36. Qd4 d2! 37. Qxd2 Rg1 38. f3 Bb5! 0–1 39...Bf1+ will win White's queen.

Achievements
Preceded by Levon Aronian	World Rapid Chess Champion; 2010	Succeeded by Sergey Karjakin
Preceded by Lev Alburt	United States Chess Champion; 1991	Succeeded by Patrick Wolff
Preceded by Hikaru Nakamura	United States Chess Champion; 2010–2011	Succeeded by Hikaru Nakamura
Preceded by Hikaru Nakamura	United States Chess Champion; 2013-2014	Succeeded by Hikaru Nakamura
