= Indian Youth Chess Championship =

Annual national youth chess championship of India

The National Youth Chess Championship (India) are the premier annual youth chess championship tournaments held in both open and girls categories for participants in under-7, under-9, under-11, under-13, under-15 and under-17 age categories in India. The tournament is held annually under the auspices of the All India Chess Federation and FIDE. This event is open to players from all the States and union territories of India. The tournament has 6 age brackets, in two-year increments, from U7 (under-7) to U17 (under-17). For each age bracket, there is an open championship and a separate championship for girls. Winners of each category are awarded the title of Indian Youth Champion, and top finishers earn direct FIDE titles such as Candidate Master (CM), FIDE Master (FM), International Master (IM), Woman Candidate Master (WCM), Woman FIDE Master (WFM), and Woman International Master (WIM), depending on section and performance.

Under FIDE regulations, continental youth champions are entitled to personal rights to participate in the corresponding World Cadet Chess Championship (Under-8 to Under-12) or World Youth Chess Championship (Under-14 to Under-18). Besides Indian Youth Chess Championship, there are National Junior Chess Championship (India) and National Junior Girls Chess Championship (India) for under-19 (Open) and under-19 girls categories. Indian Chess Championship is the National Chess Championship in Open and Women categories where all age categories can participate for the coveted National Chess Championship title.

== Open championship winners (Gold medalists/champions) ==
Year	U7	U9	U11	U13	U15	U17
1987						
1988						
1989						
1990						
1991						
1992						
1993						
1994						
1995						
1996						
1997						
1998						
1999						
2000						
2001						
2002						
2003						
2004						
2005						
2006						
2007						
2008						
2009						
2010						
2011	Panda Sambit	Saurabh Anand	Prathish A	Aravindh Chithambaram	Sai Krishna G V	Navalgund Niranjan
2012						
2013	Dev Shah (Chess)	Nihal Sarin	Ram Aravind L N	Harsha Bharathakoti	Karthikeyan Murali	Sayantan Das
2014	Shahil Dey	Raunak Sadhwani	Ram Aravind L N	Hirthickkesh PR	Aravindh Chithambaram	Aradhya Garg
2015	Midilesh MS	Pranav Venkatesh	Praggnanandhaa Rameshbabu	Neelash Saha	Mitrabha Guha	Rajdeep Sarkar
2016	Priansh Das	Shahil Dey	Manish Anto Cristiano F	Erigaisi Arjun	Mitrabha Guha	Sai Vishwesh.C
2017	Shashank V S	Kadam Om Manish	Gukesh D	Raja Rithvik R	Sankalp Gupta	Raja Rithvik R
2018	Amogh Bisht	Ilamparthi A. R.	Dev Shah (Chess)	Aaryan Varshney	Ajay Karthikeyan	Vedant Panesar
2019	Sri Akhil Prasad	Aakash G	Mayank Chakraborty	Pranesh M	Raja Rithvik R	Neelash Saha
2020	Not held due to COVID-19 pandemic	Not held due to COVID-19 pandemic	Not held due to COVID-19 pandemic	Not held due to COVID-19 pandemic	Not held due to COVID-19 pandemic	Not held due to COVID-19 pandemic
2021	Avirat Chauhan	Vivaan Vishal Shah	Goutham Krishna H	John Veny Akkarakaran	Pranesh M	Soham Kamotra
2022	Nidhish Shyamal	Madhvendra Pratap Sharma	Jval Saurin Patel	Daakshin Arun	Aswath S	Mayank Chakraborty
2023	Mani Sarbartho	Advik Amit Agrawal	Aansh Nandan Nerurkar	Sharnarthi Viresh	Daksh Goyal	Mayank Chakraborty
2024	Devanarayanan Kalliyath	Nidhish Shyamal	Madhvendra Pratap Sharma	Reyan Md.	Ilamparthi A. R.	Sriram Adarsh Uppala
2025	Evan Antonio Telles	Sattwik Swain	Aarit Kapil	Badole Shaunak	Goutham Krishna H	Nandish V S

== Girls championship winners (Gold medalists/champions) ==
Year	U7	U9	U11	U13	U15	U17
1987						
1988						
1989						
1990						
1991						
1992						
1993						
1994						
1995						
1996						
1997						
1998						Aarthie Ramaswamy
1999						Aarthie Ramaswamy
2000						
2001						
2002						
2003						
2004						
2005			Padmini Rout			
2006				Padmini Rout		
2007			P. V. Nandhidhaa			
2008						
2009						
2010					P. V. Nandhidhaa	
2011	Saina Salonika	Nutakki Priyanka	Riya Savant	Monnisha G K	Michelle Catherina P	Monnisha G K
2012	Divya Deshmukh	Savitha Shri Baskar	Vaishali Rameshbabu	Vaishali Rameshbabu	Srija Seshadri	Pratyusha Bodda
2013	Darsana M S	Divya Deshmukh	Nutakki Priyanka	Aakanksha Hagawane	Monnisha G K	P. V. Nandhidhaa
2014	Yashavishree N	Rakshitta Ravi	Lakshmi C	Vaishali Rameshbabu	Vaishali Rameshbabu	Varshini V
2015	Anagha K G R	Darsana M S	Mrudul Dehankar	Nutakki Priyanka	Harshita Guddanti	Varshini V
2016	Shefali A N	Savitha Shri Baskar	Divya Deshmukh	Jishitha D	Harshita Guddanti	Aakanksha Hagawane
2017	Hatvalne Swarali	Anupam M Sreekumar	Savitha Shri Baskar	Jyothsna L	Divya Deshmukh	Priyanka K
2018	Lakshana Subramanian	Sneha Halder	Savitha Shri Baskar	Dhyana Patel	Divya Deshmukh	Priyanka K
2019	Siddhi Rao	Vidula Anbuselvan	Anupam M Sreekumar	Sarayu Velpula	Divya Deshmukh	Ghosh Samriddhaa
2020	Not held due to COVID-19 pandemic	Not held due to COVID-19 pandemic	Not held due to COVID-19 pandemic	Not held due to COVID-19 pandemic	Not held due to COVID-19 pandemic	Not held due to COVID-19 pandemic
2021	Charvi A	Charvi A	Shubhi Gupta	Mrittika Mallick	Boramanikar Tanisha S	Bhagyashree Patil
2022	Sharvaanica A S	Pratitee Bordoloi	Prishita Gupta	Sneha Halder	Tejaswini G	Bhagyashree Patil
2023	Narayani Umesh Marathe	Samhita Pungavanam	Pratitee Bordoloi	Shreya G Hipparagi	Mrittika Mallick	Mrittika Mallick
2024	Aaranya R	Kiyanna Parihaar	Divi Bijesh	Saranya Devi Narahari	Prishita Gupta	Tejaswini G
2025	Shreyanshi Jain	Girisha Prasanna Pai	Krisha Tamhant Jain	Modipalli Deekshitha	Arshiya Das	Pratitee Bordoloi

== See also ==
- North American Youth Chess Championship
- African Junior Chess Championship
- Asian Junior Chess Championship
- European Junior Chess Championship
- European Youth Chess Championship
- Pan American Junior Chess Championship
- World Youth Chess Championship
