= World Blitz Chess Championship 2023 =

Global chess tournament

- Samarkand, Uzbekistan
- 30–31 December 2023
	World Blitz Champion	Women's; World Blitz Champion
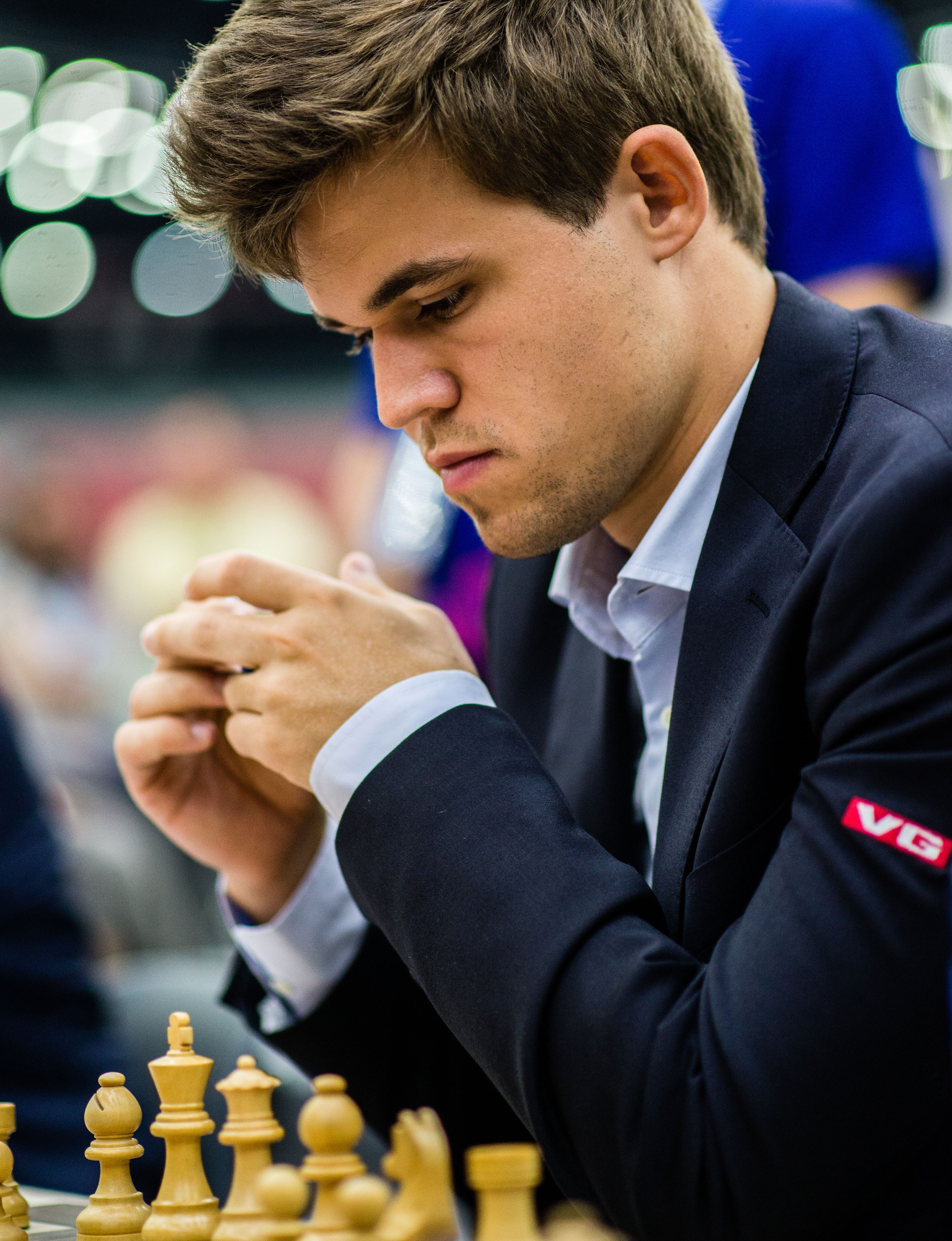
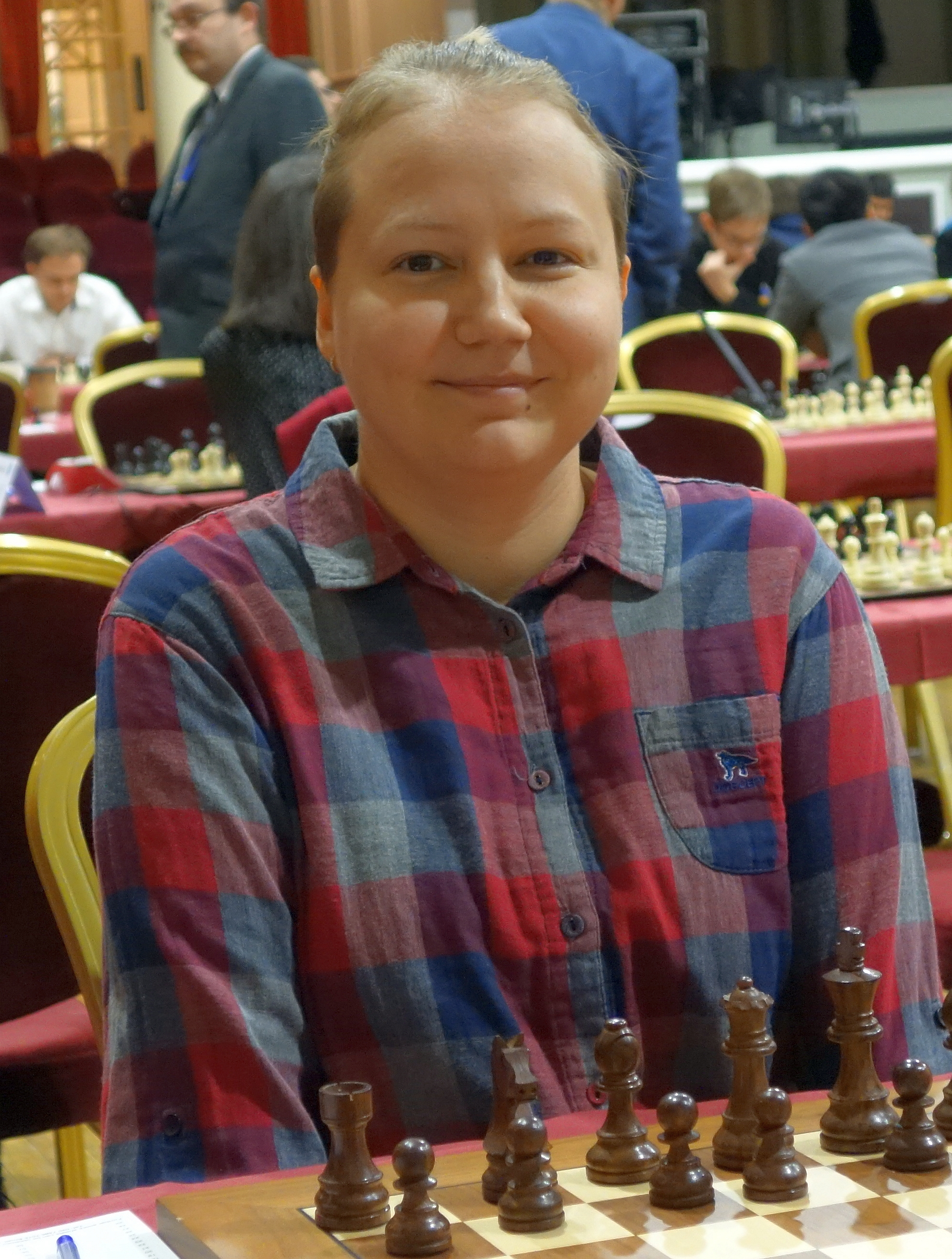
	(Norway) Magnus Carlsen	(FIDE) Valentina Gunina
16/21	Scores	14/17

The 2023 World Blitz Chess Championship was an annual chess tournament held by FIDE to determine the world champion in chess played under blitz time controls. Since 2012, FIDE has held the World Rapid and Blitz Championships at a joint tournament. The tournament was held in Samarkand, Uzbekistan, from 30 to 31 December 2023, using a Swiss-system with 21 rounds for the open tournament and 17 rounds for the women's tournament.

== Participants ==
206 players took part in the open tournament and 118 in the women's tournament.

Code	Federation	Open	Women's	Total
ARG	Argentina	1	0	1
ARM	Armenia	9	3	12
AUS	Australia	1	0	1
AZE	Azerbaijan	8	9	17
BEL	Belgium	1	0	1
BRA	Brazil	1	0	1
BUL	Bulgaria	1	4	5
CHL	Chile	2	0	2
CHN	China	6	9	15
TPE	Chinese Taipei	1	0	1
COL	Colombia	1	1	2
CZE	(Czech Republic) Czechia	1	0	1
EST	Estonia	0	1	1
FRA	France	2	2	4
GEO	(Georgia (country)) Georgia	3	4	7
GER	Germany	1	1	2
GRE	Greece	0	1	1
HUN	Hungary	3	0	3
IND	India	17	11	28
IRI	Iran	4	0	4
IRL	(Republic of Ireland) Ireland	1	0	1
ITA	Italy	1	0	1
KAZ	Kazakhstan	14	11	25
KGZ	Kyrgyzstan	2	2	4
LTU	Lithuania	0	1	1
LUX	Luxembourg	0	1	1
MDA	Moldova	1	0	1
MNE	Montenegro	1	0	1
MGL	Mongolia	3	3	6
MAR	Morocco	2	0	2
NED	Netherlands	4	1	5
NZL	New Zealand	1	0	1
NOR	Norway	5	0	5
PER	Peru	3	1	4
POL	Poland	5	2	7
QAT	Qatar	0	1	1
ROU	Romania	2	0	2
SRB	Serbia	6	1	7
SLO	Slovenia	2	0	2
ESP	Spain	4	2	6
SUI	Switzerland	1	1	2
TJK	Tajikistan	2	0	2
TUR	Turkey	4	1	5
TKM	Turkmenistan	2	3	5
UGA	Uganda	1	1	2
UKR	Ukraine	4	4	8
UAE	United Arab Emirates	1	0	1
USA	United States	6	4	10
UZB	Uzbekistan (host)	21	13	34
FID	(FIDE) none	44	19	63

== Tiebreak regulations ==
For players who finish on the same score, final position was determined by the following tie-breaks, in order:

1. Buchholz Cut 1
2. Buchholz
3. Average Rating of Opponents Cut 1 (average rating of opponents excluding the lowest rated opponent)
4. Results of individual games between tied players
5. Drawing of lots

If two or more players are tied for any position other than first, the above-mentioned tiebreak system shall decide the ranking of the tied players. If there is a tie for the 1st place, a play-off shall be played among all players in the tie to determine the new champion.

== Open tournament results ==
The following table lists all participants, with the results from the 21 rounds. They are ranked according to the results, taking into account the tie-breaks.

Notation: "1 (W 140)" indicates a win (1 point) with white pieces (W) against player who finished in 140th place.

Rank	Name	Rating	1	2	3	4	5	6	7	8	9	10	11	12	13	14	15	16	17	18	19	20	21	Total	BC1	BS	AROC1
1	(Norway) Magnus Carlsen	2887	1 (W 140)																					16	256½	265½	2673
2	(FIDE) Daniil Dubov	2763																						15½	262½	272½	2700
3	(FIDE) Vladislav Artemiev	2799																						15	260½	271½	2702
4	(France) Maxime Vachier-Lagrave	2748																						14½	260½	269	2670
5	(FIDE) Ian Nepomniachtchi	2795																						14	263	271	2670
6	(India) Arjun Erigaisi	2729																						14	256	264	2652
7	(United States) Levon Aronian	2772																						14	239½	247½	2597
8	(FIDE) Denis Lazavik	2556																						14	233	239	2590
9	(Serbia) Aleksandar Inđić	2631																						13½	256½	266	2674
10	(Poland) Jan-Krzysztof Duda	2775																						13½	255	265	2640
11	(Romania) Richárd Rapport	2748																						13½	244½	253½	2620
12	(United States) Fabiano Caruana	2815																						13½	244	252	2606
13	(China) Yu Yangyi	2762																						13½	242½	251	2632
14	(India) Aravindh Chithambaram	2584																						13½	240	247½	2618
15	(FIDE) Alexander Grischuk	2699																						13½	233½	242½	2545
16	(FIDE) Dmitry Andreikin	2741																						13½	232	239	2567
17	(FIDE) Rudik Makarian	2540																						13½	225½	232½	2570
18	(Iran) Bardiya Daneshvar	2483																						13½	225	231	2547
19	(FIDE) Volodar Murzin	2591																						13	257	265½	2700
20	(Serbia) Alexey Sarana	2707																						13	254	263½	2614
21	(FIDE) Zhamsaran Tsydypov	2626																						13	244½	252½	2602
22	(Azerbaijan) Shakhriyar Mamedyarov	2716																						13	243	251	2602
23	(FIDE) Peter Svidler	2689																						13	243	251	2597
24	(Georgia (country)) Baadur Jobava	2599																						13	230	238½	2560
25	(FIDE) Evgeny Tomashevsky	2663																						13	227½	235½	2550
26	(Armenia) Robert Hovhannisyan	2570																						13	224½	232½	2553
27	(Germany) Vincent Keymer	2629																						13	212½	220½	2475
28	(India) R Praggnanandhaa	2665																						12½	257	267½	2639
29	(Uzbekistan) Shamsiddin Vokhidov	2588																						12½	245	254½	2621
30	(Netherlands) Anish Giri	2731																						12½	245	254½	2606
31	(Iran) Parham Maghsoodloo	2660																						12½	244	253	2573
32	(Azerbaijan) Teimour Radjabov	2664																						12½	243½	253½	2614
33	(Kazakhstan) Denis Makhnev	2528																						12½	243	254½	2653
34	(FIDE) Aleksandr Rakhmanov	2521																						12½	241	251½	2648
35	(India) S. L. Narayanan	2564																						12½	240½	250	2663
36	(United Arab Emirates) Salem Saleh	2668																						12½	239	249	2567
37	(Azerbaijan) Mahammad Muradli	2551																						12½	238	244	2580
38	(India) Gukesh Dommaraju	2657																						12½	231½	239½	2569
39	(United States) Hans Niemann	2614																						12½	229½	238	2539
40	(Uzbekistan) Nodirbek Yakubboev	2582																						12½	229	237	2544
41	(Armenia) Tigran L. Petrosian	2610																						12½	228	236	2526
42	(FIDE) Klementy Sychev	2583																						12½	216	224½	2499
43	(India) Nihal Sarin	2689																						12	259½	267	2637
44	(Iran) Amin Tabatabaei	2573																						12	252½	261½	2665
45	(FIDE) Arseniy Nesterov	2488																						12	247½	256½	2661
46	(FIDE) Alexander Riazantsev	2621																						12	243½	252½	2594
47	(India) Bharath Subramaniyam	2435																						12	242	252½	2636
48	(Azerbaijan) Rauf Mamedov	2635																						12	240½	248½	2554
49	(Uzbekistan) Javokhir Sindarov	2607																						12	239	248	2603
50	(Ukraine) Ruslan Ponomariov	2613																						12	231½	240½	2533
51	(Azerbaijan) Gadir Guseinov	2563																						12	228½	237	2592
52	(Georgia (country)) Levan Pantsulaia	2579																						12	226	233½	2568
53	(Spain) David Antón Guijarro	2616																						12	225	232½	2500
54	(Ukraine) Yuriy Kuzubov	2487																						12	220	227½	2571
55	(FIDE) Andrey Esipenko	2615																						12	217½	226½	2454
56	(Armenia) Manuel Petrosyan	2556																						12	214½	221½	2517
57	(FIDE) Aleksandr Shimanov	2611																						11½	247	255½	2601
58	(China) Bai Jinshi	2516																						11½	243	251½	2623
59	(Norway) Johan-Sebastian Christiansen	2541																						11½	243	248	2612
60	(Uzbekistan) Nodirbek Abdusattorov	2694																						11½	234½	242½	2542
61	(India) Vidit Gujrathi	2642																						11½	234	240½	2555
62	(India) Raunak Sadhwani	2668																						11½	232½	242	2567
63	(Serbia) Alexandr Predke	2594																						11½	231	239½	2547
64	(Ukraine) Anton Korobov	2649																						11½	230	237½	2550
65	(India) Adhiban Baskaran	2576																						11½	229½	238	2544
66	(Belgium) Daniel Dardha	2568																						11½	227	234½	2532
67	(FIDE) Maxim Matlakov	2638																						11½	225½	235	2545
68	(FIDE) Alexey Dreev	2599																						11½	225½	233½	2540
69	(Kazakhstan) Kazybek Nogerbek	2488																						11½	225	231	2586
70	(Australia) Anton Smirnov	2647																						11½	222½	231	2540
71	(Iran) Pouya Idani	2574																						11½	219½	226½	2527
72	(India) Aditya Mittal	2425																						11½	216	222½	2523
73	(Armenia) Samvel Ter-Sahakyan	2556																						11½	213½	220½	2461
74	(FIDE) Pavel Ponkratov	2547																						11½	208	216	2436
75	(Spain) Eduardo Iturrizaga	2645																						11½	205½	213½	2441
76	(Uzbekistan) Jakhongir Vakhidov	2574																						11	234½	243½	2555
77	(Azerbaijan) Aydin Suleymanli	2553																						11	234½	241½	2597
78	(FIDE) Vladislav Kovalev	2539																						11	233½	240½	2624
79	(FIDE) Dmitry Bocharov	2482																						11	233	241½	2578
80	(FIDE) Artem Uskov	2328																						11	231½	239	2606
81	(Netherlands) Jorden van Foreest	2664																						11	231	239½	2544
82	(India) Mitrabha Guha	2512																						11	231	238½	2526
83	(Armenia) Shant Sargsyan	2633																						11	226½	234½	2535
84	(Turkey) Vahap Şanal	2637																						11	225	233½	2522
85	(France) Laurent Fressinet	2636																						11	223½	231	2528
86	(FIDE) David Paravyan	2566																						11	218½	224	2494
87	(FIDE) Aleksey Grebnev	2404																						11	215	223	2578
88	(Uzbekistan) Mukhammadali Abdurakhmonov	2214																						11	213½	221	2552
89	(India) Karthik Venkataraman	2440																						11	213	218	2532
90	(Norway) Aryan Tari	2577																						11	212½	222	2470
91	(Uzbekistan) Mukhiddin Madaminov	2460																						11	212	220	2559
92	(Bulgaria) Ivan Cheparinov	2613																						11	210½	222	2499
93	(Serbia) Velimir Ivić	2542																						11	209	212½	2484
94	(Spain) Maksim Chigaev	2561																						11	208½	214½	2468
95	(Poland) Jakub Kosakowski	2485																						11	208	211½	2508
96	(Kyrgyzstan) Eldiar Orozbaev	2236																						11	206½	212½	2524
97	(Kazakhstan) Arystan Isanzhulov	2431																						11	188½	192	2400
98	(Hungary) Sanan Sjugirov	2569																						10½	250	259	2673
99	(Montenegro) Nikita Petrov	2521																						10½	231	239	2576
100	(Peru) Renato Terry	2578																						10½	223	231	2569
101	(Slovenia) Vladimir Fedoseev	2719																						10½	221½	231	2524
102	(Ukraine) Alexander Moiseenko	2556																						10½	215½	223½	2513
103	(Uzbekistan) Asrorjon Omonov	2069																						10½	215	223½	2547
104	(Turkey) Ediz Gurel	2359																						10½	215	223	2561
105	(Uzbekistan) Ortik Nigmatov	2382																						10½	212	219	2571
106	(Kazakhstan) Zhandos Agmanov	2407																						10½	208½	215	2522
107	(Poland) Kacper Piorun	2589																						10½	204½	211½	2437
108	(Chile) Cristobal Henriquez Villagra	2568																						10½	204	213	2447
109	(Hungary) Róbert Ruck	2561																						10½	203½	211½	2418
110	(FIDE) Vadim Zvjaginsev	2570																						10½	202½	211	2443
111	(Uzbekistan) Mukhammadzokhid Suyarov	2449																						10½	202½	210	2528
112	(China) Zeng Chongsheng	2504																						10½	198½	205½	2416
113	(Uzbekistan) Abdimalik Abdisalimov	2417																						10½	197	207	2436
114	(Italy) Sabino Brunello	2573																						10½	191½	199	2395
115	(Slovenia) Anton Demchenko	2545																						10½	190½	197½	2345
116	(China) Xu Xiangyu	2491																						10½	189	194	2353
117	(India) Pranav V	2562																						10½	187½	195	2358
118	(Chile) Rodrigo Vásquez Schroeder	2582																						10	239	248½	2555
119	(FIDE) Ilia Iljiushenok	2479																						10	222	229	2477
120	(United States) Timur Gareyev	2569																						10	218½	227	2476
121	(Norway) Benjamin Haldorsen	2405																						10	217	224½	2568
122	(Turkey) Cem Kaan Gökerkan	2365																						10	215	222	2553
123	(FIDE) Denis Khismatullin	2552																						10	214½	221½	2457
124	(Georgia (country)) Giga Quparadze	2617																						10	209½	217½	2485
125	(FIDE) Evgeniy Najer	2545																						10	208	214½	2458
126	(Kazakhstan) Rinat Jumabayev	2561																						10	207	215	2436
127	(FIDE) Savva Vetokhin	2483																						10	205½	212	2440
128	(Netherlands) Lucas van Foreest	2519																						10	203½	211	2445
129	(FIDE) Roman Kezin	2492																						10	197½	204½	2411
130	(FIDE) Boris Savchenko	2513																						10	196	204	2393
131	(Uzbekistan) Saidakbar Saydaliev	2323																						10	195½	202	2519
132	(Spain) Alan Pichot	2592																						10	173½	179½	2333
133	(India) Pranesh M	2481																						9½	235½	245	2606
134	(FIDE) Maksim Tsaruk	2378																						9½	226	234	2596
135	(Netherlands) Liam Vrolijk	2487																						9½	221	228½	2578
136	(United States) Andrew Hong	2460																						9½	214	221½	2512
137	(Uzbekistan) Almas Rakhmatullaev	2218																						9½	212	220½	2550
138	(Kazakhstan) Arystanbek Urazayev	2408																						9½	211½	214½	2536
139	(Azerbaijan) Kanan Garayev	2260																						9½	207½	216½	2512
140	(Hungary) Sergey Grigoriants	2532	0 (B 1)																					9½	207½	214½	2396
141	(Uzbekistan) Bobir Sattarov	2351																						9½	203	210	2471
142	(Norway) Elham Amar	2470																						9½	201	208	2455
143	(Mongolia) Sumiya Bilguun	2407																						9½	201	204	2471
144	(Moldova) Victor Bologan	2489																						9½	196½	204	2436
145	(Uzbekistan) Akmal Fayzullaev	2342																						9½	194½	199½	2457
146	(FIDE) Andrey Gorovets	2418																						9½	194½	199	2404
147	(China) Xiu Deshun	2493																						9½	191	196½	2331
148	(India) Sandipan Chanda	2490																						9½	183	190½	2349
149	(Peru) Steven Rojas Salas	2210																						9½	182	185½	2348
150	(Azerbaijan) Vugar Asadli	2584																						9½	181½	188½	2376
151	(Kazakhstan) Alisher Suleymenov	2326																						9	206½	213½	2540
152	(Switzerland) Gabriel Gaehwiler	2448																						9	205½	212½	2504
153	(Uzbekistan) Khumoyun Begmuratov	2276																						9	202½	210	2522
154	(Kazakhstan) Aldiyar Ansat	2404																						9	202	209½	2441
155	(FIDE) Matvey Galchenko	2424																						9	200	204½	2482
156	(FIDE) David Akhmedov	2154																						9	196½	202	2440
157	(Mongolia) Munkhdalai Amilal	2293																						9	194½	200½	2413
158	(India) Surya Shekhar Ganguly	2549																						9	193½	201½	2368
159	(Kazakhstan) Murtas Kazhgaleyev	2488																						9	193	199½	2392
160	(Kazakhstan) Daniyal Sapenov	2289																						9	191½	196½	2457
161	(Poland) Grzegorz Nasuta	2467																						9	191½	196	2426
162	(Kazakhstan) Rustam Khusnutdinov	2499																						9	189½	195½	2389
163	(FIDE) Nikolay Averin	2283																						9	181	186½	2450
164	(Brazil) Giovanni Vescovi	2593																						9	169½	174	2278
165	(Tajikistan) Mustafokhuja Khusenkhojaev	2082																						9	154½	155½	2234
166	(Kazakhstan) Ramazan Zhalmakhanov	2427																						8½	222½	229	2558
167	(FIDE) Lev Zverev	2299																						8½	212	220	2530
168	(Serbia) Mikhail Bryakin	2495																						8½	198	202½	2434
169	(FIDE) Artem Pingin	2358																						8½	195	201½	2455
170	(Turkmenistan) Mergen Kakabayev	2255																						8½	194½	200½	2417
171	(Uzbekistan) Bakhrom Bakhrillaev	1994																						8½	193½	200	2466
172	(Serbia) Sinisa Drazic	2276																						8½	180½	185½	2373
173	(Republic of Ireland) Tom O'Gorman	2288																						8½	178	180	2307
174	(Argentina) Faustino Oro	2105																						8½	172½	176½	2312
175	(FIDE) Mikhail Kobalia	2558																						8	213	219½	2440
176	(Poland) Jakub Seemann	2332																						8	208½	217½	2505
177	(China) Xue Haowen	2155																						8	206½	214½	2506
178	(Mongolia) Sumiya Chinguun	2200																						8	206	214½	2514
179	(Armenia) Mamikon Gharibyan	2444																						8	204	211	2466
180	(Kyrgyzstan) Mikhail Markov	2255																						8	193	200	2482
181	(Colombia) Andres Felipe Gallego Alcaraz	2384																						8	182½	187½	2306
182	(Uzbekistan) Jamshid Mustafaev	2323																						8	175	177½	2356
183	(Armenia) Tigran K. Harutyunyan	2407																						8	171½	173½	2288
184	(Chinese Taipei) Raymond Song	2383																						8	169	171½	2273
185	(Uzbekistan) Miraziz Kuziev	2196																						8	166½	168½	2301
186	(Peru) Gianmarco Leiva	2338																						7½	200½	207½	2456
187	(Uzbekistan) Daler Vakhidov	2110																						7½	192½	197	2330
188	(Czech Republic) Štěpán Žilka	2494																						7½	187½	192½	2370
189	(FIDE) Roman Shogdzhiev	2117																						7½	181½	187	2419
190	(Tajikistan) Jaloliddin Ilkhomi	2054																						7½	172	175	2385
191	(Uganda) Harold Wanyama	2228																						7½	170½	171½	2318
192	(Kazakhstan) Danis Kuandykuly	1718																						7½	169½	170½	2241
193	(FIDE) Sergey Sklokin	1995																						7½	167½	171	2282
194	(Armenia) Haik M. Martirosyan	2770																						7	199½	216½	2485
195	(New Zealand) Felix Xie	2107																						7	183	187½	2381
196	(Turkmenistan) Shahruh Turayev	2168																						7	177½	179½	2366
197	(Uzbekistan) Abdumajid Botiraliev	1515																						6½	180	185½	2342
198	(Kazakhstan) Ernur Amangeldy	2144																						6½	173½	175½	2215
199	(Morocco) Mohamed Tissir	2458																						6½	166½	167	2198
200	(FIDE) Nikolay Tregubenko	1955																						6½	159	160½	2211
201	(United States) Conrad Holt	2592																						6	185½	205	2478
202	(Morocco) Khalil Nafri	2151																						5½	161	162½	2281
203	(Turkey) Timur Yonal	1862																						5	166½	168½	2268
204	(Armenia) Emin Ohanyan	2387																						4½	155	186½	2455
205	(FIDE) David Bogdan	1880																						3½	161	166	2235
206	(Romania) Kirill Shevchenko	2603																						2	101	148½	2321

== Women's tournament results ==
The following table lists all participants, with the results from the 17 rounds. They are ranked according to the results, taking into account the tie-breaks.

Notation: "1 (W 66)" indicates a win (1 point) with white pieces (W) against player who finished in 66th place.

Rank	Name	Rating	1	2	3	4	5	6	7	8	9	10	11	12	13	14	15	16	17	Total	BC1	BS	AROC1
1	(FIDE) Valentina Gunina	2348	1 (W 66)																	14	170	177	2380
2	(Switzerland) Alexandra Kosteniuk	2455																		13½	173½	182	2326
3	(China) Zhu Jiner	2384																		12½	170	178½	2338
4	(Mongolia) Turmunkh Munkhzul	2211																		11½	176½	184	2408
5	(FIDE) Kateryna Lagno	2522																		11½	165½	173½	2338
6	(Kazakhstan) Bibisara Assaubayeva	2476																		11	168½	175	2338
7	(India) Harika Dronavalli	2420																		11	168	173	2329
8	(Kazakhstan) Meruert Kamalidenova	2314																		11	161½	167½	2330
9	(Ukraine) Anna Muzychuk	2447																		11	160½	168	2236
10	(Bulgaria) Antoaneta Stefanova	2398																		11	158½	165½	2270
11	(FIDE) Aleksandra Goryachkina	2475																		11	157½	164	2284
12	(FIDE) Polina Shuvalova	2342																		11	157	165	2305
13	(India) Divya Deshmukh	2315																		11	155½	157½	2303
14	(China) Ju Wenjun	2522																		11	153	161	2308
15	(Armenia) Mariam Mkrtchyan	2150																		10½	159½	168½	2332
16	(Estonia) Mai Narva	2292																		10½	158	165½	2314
17	(India) Koneru Humpy	2452																		10½	156	159½	2273
18	(Kazakhstan) Alua Nurmanova	2249																		10½	155	161	2300
19	(Ukraine) Mariya Muzychuk	2443																		10½	153	160	2252
20	(Mongolia) Batkhuyag Munguntuul	2348																		10½	151½	159	2225
21	(FIDE) Alina Bivol	2250																		10½	135	141	2206
22	(FIDE) Leya Garifullina	2216																		10	168	174	2426
23	(China) Lei Tingjie	2530																		10	151½	157½	2270
24	(FIDE) Daria Charochkina	2254																		10	149	155	2226
25	(Kazakhstan) Xeniya Balabayeva	2202																		10	148	154	2280
26	(FIDE) Ekaterina Borisova	2130																		10	146	152	2321
27	(India) Sahithi Varshini Moogi	2189																		10	145½	152½	2310
28	(China) Tan Zhongyi	2519																		10	143½	153½	2215
29	(Georgia (country)) Meri Arabidze	2416																		10	135½	139	2159
30	(China) Zhai Mo	2342																		10	134	140	2157
31	(FIDE) Anastasia Bodnaruk	2260																		9½	167	174	2304
32	(Azerbaijan) Gunay Mammadzada	2408																		9½	162½	168½	2286
33	(Germany) Dinara Wagner	2350																		9½	155½	162½	2270
34	(Uzbekistan) Umida Omonova	2304																		9½	152½	159½	2283
35	(Ukraine) Anna Ushenina	2334																		9½	152	159½	2206
36	(India) Vaishali Rameshbabu	2410																		9½	148	155	2230
37	(Georgia (country)) Bela Khotenashvili	2358																		9½	148	151½	2211
38	(Spain) Sarasadat Khademalsharieh	2395																		9½	146	152	2217
39	(Kazakhstan) Zarina Nurgaliyeva	2001																		9½	136½	141½	2248
40	(FIDE) Anna Shukhman	2093																		9	157½	165½	2359
41	(Bulgaria) Nurgyul Salimova	2343																		9	155	161	2244
42	(United States) Atousa Pourkashiyan	2221																		9	149	149	2319
43	(China) Ni Shiqun	2270																		9	148	154½	2241
44	(Armenia) Elina Danielian	2352																		9	147	153	2262
45	(Georgia (country)) Sofio Gvetadze	2170																		9	146½	152½	2306
46	(India) Nutakki Priyanka	2224																		9	144½	150½	2235
47	(Bulgaria) Nadya Toncheva	2162																		9	142	147	2296
48	(FIDE) Daria Voit	2215																		9	140½	146½	2292
49	(Poland) Oliwia Kiołbasa	2313																		9	139½	145½	2186
50	(Greece) Stavroula Tsolakidou	2345																		9	136½	143	2155
51	(France) Mitra Hejazipour	2228																		9	134½	140½	2203
52	(Bulgaria) Gergana Peycheva	2216																		9	133½	139½	2176
53	(FIDE) Baira Kovanova	2234																		9	132	138	2123
54	(China) Lu Miaoyi	2284																		9	130	132	2183
55	(Turkmenistan) Jemal Ovezdurdiyeva	2086																		9	119½	124½	2105
56	(Armenia) Susanna Gaboyan	2086																		8½	150½	157½	2343
57	(Kyrgyzstan) Assel Lesbekova	1861																		8½	148	156	2313
58	(Luxembourg) Elvira Berend	2202																		8½	148	154	2317
59	(India) Rakshitta Ravi	2225																		8½	145	151½	2324
60	(Mongolia) Davaadembereliin Nomin-Erdene	2299																		8½	143½	150	2240
61	(Serbia) Teodora Injac	2287																		8½	143	149	2219
62	(FIDE) Olga Badelka	2262																		8½	137½	143½	2106
63	(Peru) Deysi Cori	2304																		8½	137	143	2182
64	(FIDE) Evgenija Ovod	2151																		8½	135	141	2183
65	(India) Padmini Rout	2302																		8½	132½	139	2154
66	(Kazakhstan) Assel Serikbay	2126	0 (B 1)																	8½	129½	135½	2130
67	(Spain) Ana Matnadze	2428																		8	153	161	2252
68	(Turkey) Gulenay Aydin	2009																		8	145½	152½	2302
69	(Georgia (country)) Nino Batsiashvili	2233																		8	144	150	2272
70	(Ukraine) Nataliya Buksa	2316																		8	144	150	2189
71	(Kazakhstan) Nazerke Nurgali	2068																		8	143	149½	2281
72	(Uzbekistan) Afruza Khamdamova	2295																		8	142½	147½	2255
73	(Azerbaijan) Govhar Beydullayeva	2132																		8	136½	142½	2218
74	(Azerbaijan) Gulnar Mammadova	2247																		8	134½	141½	2171
75	(Azerbaijan) Khanim Balajayeva	2207																		8	134	140½	2137
76	(Azerbaijan) Ulviyya Fataliyeva	2268																		8	132	138	2114
77	(FIDE) Varvara Poliakova	2049																		8	131½	137½	2211
78	(China) Zhao Shengxin	2079																		8	130	136	2185
79	(FIDE) Tatyana Getman	2014																		8	125	130	2222
80	(Azerbaijan) Turkan Mamedjarova	2175																		8	122½	124½	2087
81	(Azerbaijan) Ayan Allahverdiyeva	1852																		8	121	123	2174
82	(United States) Irina Krush	2359																		7½	138½	145	2165
83	(India) Sarayu Velpula	1747																		7½	138½	144½	2246
84	(Azerbaijan) Khayala Abdulla	2118																		7½	132½	139	2166
85	(Uzbekistan) Maftuna Bobomurodova	1814																		7½	132	135½	2196
86	(Poland) Michalina Rudzińska	2113																		7½	129	129	2217
87	(Azerbaijan) Laman Hajiyeva	2076																		7½	128½	133½	2227
88	(China) Yan Tianqi	2086																		7½	120½	120½	2102
89	(FIDE) Mariya Yakimova	2098																		7½	117	117	2024
90	(Uzbekistan) Nodira Nadirjanova	2164																		7½	98½	98½	1958
91	(United States) Jennifer Yu	2197																		7	147	153½	2248
92	(Netherlands) Anna-Maja Kazarian	2023																		7	142	148	2264
93	(India) Savitha Shri B	2183																		7	138½	144½	2182
94	(Turkmenistan) Leyla Shohradova	1882																		7	132	138½	2209
95	(Kazakhstan) Amina Kairbekova	2131																		7	126	126	2140
96	(India) Soumya Swaminathan	2154																		7	123	123	2018
97	(Qatar) Zhu Chen	2379																		7	120	122	2036
98	(Turkmenistan) Lala Shohradova	1983																		7	111	111	2105
99	(Lithuania) Salomėja Zaksaitė	2065																		7	110½	110½	2093
100	(FIDE) Olga Druzhinina	2055																		6½	132½	138½	2208
101	(United States) Gulrukhbegim Tokhirjonova	2265																		6½	132	138½	2159
102	(Kazakhstan) Liya Kurmangaliyeva	2077																		6½	128½	133½	2174
103	(Uzbekistan) Nilufar Yakubbaeva	2237																		6½	124	126	2019
104	(Colombia) Angela Franco Valencia	2048																		6½	117½	122½	2178
105	(Uzbekistan) Guldona Karimova	1547																		6½	116½	116½	2143
106	(Uzbekistan) Marjona Malikova	1730																		6½	116½	116½	2116
107	(Kazakhstan) Elnaz Kaliakhmet	1839																		6	127	130½	2204
108	(Uzbekistan) Hulkar Tohirjonova	2144																		6	126½	128½	2184
109	(France) Pauline Guichard	2281																		6	124½	130½	2099
110	(Kazakhstan) Aiaru Altynbek	1641																		6	121	121	2126
111	(Kyrgyzstan) Aimonchok Zhunusbekova	1448																		6	118½	120½	2153
112	(Uzbekistan) Sarvinoz Kurbonboeva	2054																		6	117	117	2107
113	(Uzbekistan) Yulduz Hamrakulova	1908																		6	116	116	2085
114	(Uzbekistan) Zilola Aktamova	1671																		6	115	117	2141
115	(FIDE) Galina Strutinskaya	2174																		5	114	114	2016
116	(Uzbekistan) Iroda Khamrakulova	2132																		3½	111½	111½	1965
117	(Uzbekistan) Shakhnoza Khamrakulova	2086																		2	110½	110½	2019
118	(Uganda) Sheba Valentine Naisanga	1358																		0	106½	108½	2046
