= P. V. Nandhidhaa =

Indian chess player (born 1996)

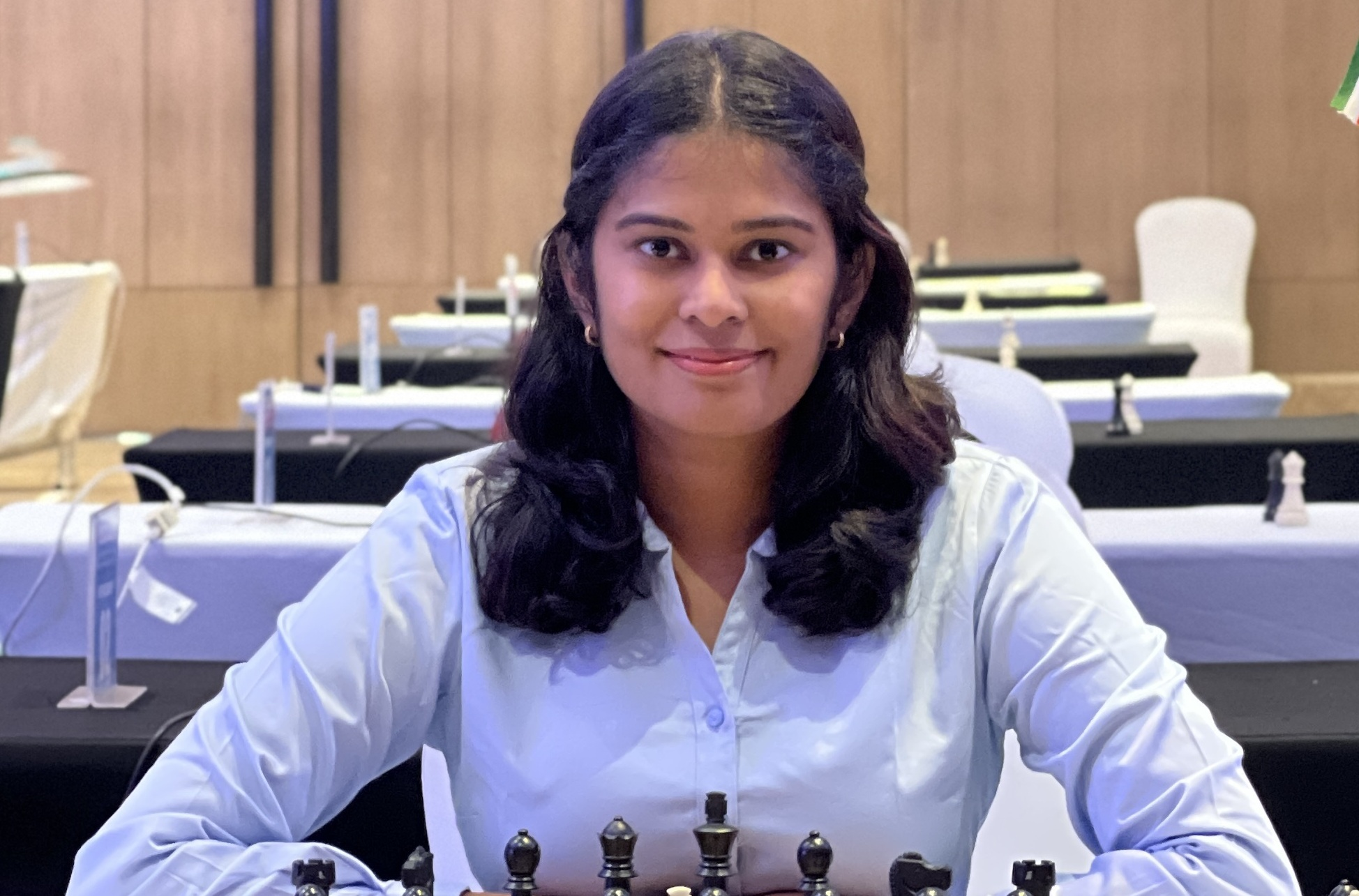
- P. V. Nandhidhaa in 2022

Personal information
- Born: 10 April 1996 (age 30) Sankagiri, Salem district, Tamil Nadu, India

Chess career
- Country: India
- Title: Woman Grandmaster (2019)
- Peak rating: 2380 (February 2022)

Pallathur Venkatachalam Nandhidhaa (Tamil: பள்ளத்தூர் வெங்கடாசலம் நந்திதா) (born 10 April 1996) is an Indian chess player from the state of Tamil Nadu, who holds the FIDE titles of Woman Grandmaster (WGM) and Woman International Master (WIM). She is the 17th Woman Grandmaster of India. Her peak FIDE ELO rating is 2380 and she is holding 9 International Master norms as of December 2025. She is the runner-up in World Junior Chess Championship in 2016. She won the women's edition of National Premier Chess Championship in both 2024 and 2025 consecutively.

Nandhidhaa won an individual Gold in Asian Chess Championship held at New Delhi on 3 November 2022, making her only the 9th Indian Woman to clinch the Asian Gold. She scored an unbeaten and impressive 7.5/9 to clinch the title, thereby also qualifying for the Women's Chess World Cup 2023. She won 7 medals each in Commonwealth Chess Championship and Asian level Chess Championship tournaments in different age categories. She also has 7 National level Chess Championship titles in different age categories. She had participated in Women's Chess World Cup 2023 and 2025. In the latest Women's Chess World Cup 2025 held in Georgia in July 2025, she lost her second round match vs GM Dronavalli Harika and got eliminated. She secured her spot in the upcoming Women's Chess World Cup 2027 by winning the 51st National Women's Chess Championship 2025 held at Durgapur in West Bengal.

== Career ==
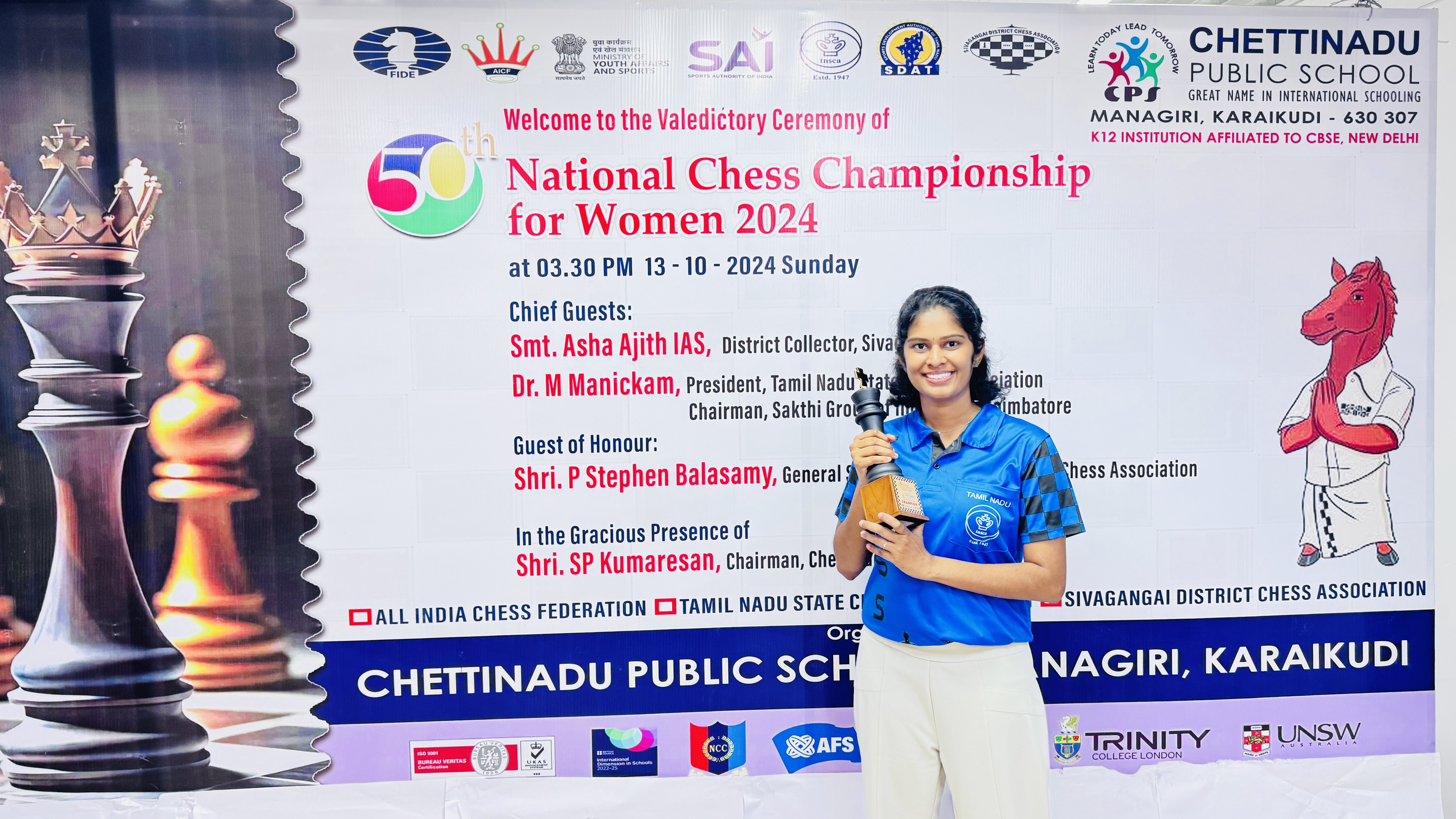
Nandhidhaa after winning the Individual Gold medal in Indian Chess Championship 2024

Nandhidhaa won silver medal in the U-20 World Junior Chess Championship, in 2016 held at Bhubaneswar, Odisha, India. She won bronze medal in U-14 World Youth Chess Championship held at Halkidiki, Greece in 2010. In October 2020, she was part of the Indian women chess team along with Vaishali Rameshbabu, Padmini Rout, Bhakti Kulkarni, Mary Ann Gomes which won the Asian Nations (Regions) Online Chess Championship 2020 organised by FIDE. The team won the gold medal for India out of 31 Asian countries participated. She had participated in both Women's Chess World Cup 2023 and Women's Chess World Cup 2025. She was part of the Indian Women's team along with her compatriots Padmini Rout, Srija Seshadri, Savitha Shri Baskar and Sarayu Velpula in the World Team Chess Championship 2025 held in Linares, Spain from 17 to 24 November 2025.

== Achievements ==
=== 2025 ===
- Gold Medal at 51st National Women Chess Championship 2025 in Durgapur, qualifying for the Women's Chess World Cup 2027

=== 2024 ===
- Second position in women's category of Qatar Masters Open. During the course of the tournament, she received her Ninth International Master norm with a performance rating of 2514.
- Gold Medal at 50th National Women Chess Championship 2024 in Karaikudi, qualifying for the Women's Chess World Cup 2025 in Georgia
- Silver Medal in the Women's category of III Open International Chess Menorca A held in Menorca, Spain from 2 Apr 2024 to 7 Apr 2024. She has secured 6 points in 9 rounds with the performance rating of 2502 and gained 48 ELO ratings. During the course of the tournament, she received her Eighth International Master norm
- Bronze Medal at the Commonwealth Chess Championship held in Malacca, Malaysia in Feb 2024
- Gold Medal at 2nd Indore International Grandmaster Chess Tournament 2024 - GM Open (Women Category) held in Indore

=== 2023 ===
- Gold medal at 4th Tamil Nadu IM Norm Closed Circuit Chess Tournament held in Kodaikanal, Tamilnadu in Nov 2023. During the course of the tournament, she received her Sixth International Master norm

=== 2022 ===
- Gold Medal in the Women category at the 50th edition of the Rilton Cup. Best women Chess player. During the course of the tournament, she received her fifth International Master norm
- Gold medal at Asian Chess Championship held in New Delhi in Nov 2022. She remained undefeated throughout the tournament and got qualified for the Women's Chess World Cup 2023 in Baku, Azerbaijan
- 5th position in Board II at 44th Chess Olympiad in Chennai. She was part of Indian Women Team C and scored 8.5 points out of 11 rounds

=== 2021 ===
- Shared First place finish at 47th La Roda International Open held at La Roda, Spain in Dec 2021. No woman had previously shared first place or finished in top three of the event
- Received "Best Sportsperson of the year" award from CM of Tamilnadu Edappadi K. Palaniswami on 9 Feb 2021

=== 2020 ===
- Gold Medal at Asian Nations (Regions) Online Chess Championship in Oct 2020

=== 2019 ===
- Became India's 17th Woman Grandmaster

=== 2016 ===
- Silver Medal at 34th World Junior Chess Championship held at Bhubaneswar in India on August 21, 2016
- Gold Medal at Commonwealth Chess Championship- 2016 held in Waskaduwa, Sri Lanka from 31 Jun 2016 to 6 Aug 2016
- Silver Medal at Asian Junior Chess Championship- 2016 held in New Delhi from 4 May 2016 to 11 May 2016

=== 2015 ===
- Bronze Medal at Asian Junior Chess Championship- 2015 held at Bishkek in Kyrgyzstan from 3 Oct 2015 to 11 Oct 2015
- Bronze Medal at Commonwealth Chess Championship- 2015 held in New Delhi from 23 June 2015 to 30 June 2015

=== 2014 ===
- Silver Medal at Commonwealth Chess Championship- 2014 held at Glasgow in Scotland from 30 June 2014 to 8 July 2014

=== 2013 ===
- Gold Medal at National Chess Championship- 2013 (Under-17 Girls category) held at Dibrugarh, Assam in India

=== 2012 ===
- Silver Medal at Asian Youth Chess Championship (Under-16 Girls category) held at Hikkaduwa in Sri Lanka in 2012.

=== 2011 ===
- Gold Medal at Asian Youth Chess Championship (Under-16 Girls category) 2011 held at Subic in Philippines from 15 May 2011 to 21 May 2011.

=== 2010 ===
- Bronze medal at World Youth Chess Championship (Under-14 Girls category) held at Halkidiki, Greece in 2010

=== 2007 ===
- Gold medal at 21st Indian Youth Chess Championship (Under-11 Girls) category held at Kozhikode, Kerala in India in October 2007 where she won the Championship undefeated scoring 9 points in 11 rounds.

== Honours received ==
- Nandhidhaa holds a distinction of getting felicitated by three Chief Minister of Tamilnadu namely Late J.Jayalalithaa in 2008, Edappadi K. Palaniswami in both 2017 and 2021, M. K. Stalin in both 2022 and 2023.
- Nandhidhaa was honoured by Hon'ble Chief Minister of Tamil Nadu, M. K. Stalin and Minister for Youth Welfare and Sports Development, Udhayanidhi Stalin for the Individual Gold performance in Asian Chess Championship 2022
- For becoming "India's 17th Woman Grandmaster", Nandhidhaa was felicitated by Hon'ble CM of Tamilnadu M. K. Stalin on 07 Oct 2021 at Tamilnadu Secretariat, Chennai.
- Nandhidhaa received "Best Sportsperson of the year" award from Hon'ble CM of Tamilnadu Edappadi K. Palaniswami on 09 Feb 2021 at Tamilnadu Secretariat, Chennai.
- On 31 July 2017, Chief Minister Edappadi K. Palaniswami felicitated then Woman International Master (WIM) PV Nandhidhaa for her Silver Medal performance in 34th World Junior Chess Championship which was held at Bhubaneswar on August 21, 2016.

Awards and achievements
Preceded by Dinara Saduakassova	Women's Asian Chess Champion; 2022	Succeeded by Divya Deshmukh
Preceded by Padmini Rout	National Women Chess Champion; 2024	Succeeded by Incumbent
