= National Junior Girls Chess Championship (India) =

The National Junior Girls (Under-19) Chess Championship is an annual national-level chess tournament for Indian female players under the age of 19. The championship is held in different cities across India and serves as one of the most important junior chess competitions in the country. As of 2025, a total of 39 editions of the tournament have been conducted.

The competition is open to players who are under 19 years of age and actively competing in professional chess. The championship provides a significant platform for emerging Indian chess players to gain competitive experience and advance toward the international level.

Murali Reddy Saritha won the inaugural edition in 1987. She achieved a rare distinction of becoming a national champion in the Sub-Junior, Junior, and Senior categories in 1987. Soumya Swaminathan (chess player) holds the record for the most titles, having won the championship three times in 2005, 2006, and 2008. Shubhi Gupta is the reigning National Junior Girls Chess Champion, having also won the title in 2023. The winner of the tournament receives a cash prize of ₹1,00,000 from the event organizers.

Several former National Junior Girls Champions, including Nisha Mohota, Harika Dronavalli, Tania Sachdev, Padmini Rout, Bhakti Kulkarni, and Soumya Swaminathan (chess player), later went on to win the Indian Chess Championship, highlighting the tournament’s role in developing top-level players in Indian chess.

== Winners & runner-up list ==
Edition	Year	City	Champion	Runner-up
1	1987		Murali Reddy Saritha	
2	1988			
3	1989			
4	1989			
5	1990			
6	1991			
7	1992			
8	1993			
9	1994			
10	1995			
11	1996			
12	1997			
13	1998			
14	1999		Nisha Mohota	Sangeetha M. R.
15	2000		Nisha Mohota	
16	2001	Chennai, Tamilnadu	Harika Dronavalli	
17	2002	New Delhi	Harika Dronavalli	Saheli Nath
18	2003	Vijayawada, Andhra Pradesh	Prathiba Y Gounder	Raghavi N
19	2004	Kozhikode, Kerala	Tania Sachdev	Kruttika Nadig
20	2005	Sivakasi, Tamilnadu	Soumya Swaminathan (chess player)	Mary Ann Gomes
21	2006	New Delhi	Soumya Swaminathan (chess player)	Kiran Manisha Mohanty
22	2007	Nagpur, Maharashtra	Bhakti Kulkarni	Kruttika Nadig
23	2008	West Godavari district, Andhra Pradesh	Soumya Swaminathan (chess player)	Padmini Rout
24	2009	Chennai, Tamil Nadu	Bhakti Kulkarni	Padmini Rout
25	2010	Puri, Odisha	Padmini Rout	Divyasri Ch
26	2011	Goa	Pon Krithikha	Rucha Pujari
27	2012	Ajmer, Rajasthan	Rucha Pujari	Saranya J
28	2013	Lucknow, Uttar Pradesh	Ivana Maria Furtado	Rucha Pujari
29	2014	Pune, Maharashtra	Saranya J	Michelle Catherina P
30	2015	Dindigul, Tamil Nadu	Vaishali Rameshbabu	G. K. Monnisha
31	2016	Rajahmundry, Andhra Pradesh	Vaishali Rameshbabu	Bidhar Rutumbara
32	2017	Patna, Bihar	Mahalakshmi M	Chitlange Sakshi
33	2018	New Delhi	Chitlange Sakshi	Aakanksha Hagawane
34	2019	Gurgaon, Haryana	Srishti Pandey	Arpita Mukherjee
—	2021	Online format	Savitha Shri Baskar	Vantika Agrawal
35	2022	Gurgaon, Haryana	Nutakki Priyanka	Bhagyashree Patil
36	2022	Pune, Maharashtra	Rakshitta Ravi	Mounika Akshaya Bommini
37	2023	Ahmedabad, Gujarat	Shubhi Gupta	Dhanashree Khairmode
38	2024	Karnal, Haryana	Mrittika Mallick	Sarayu Velpula
39	2025	Jamshedpur, Jharkhand	Shubhi Gupta	Nivedita V C
