= Bodnaruk =

Bodnaruk (Ukrainian: Боднарук) is a Ukrainian gender-neutral patronymic surname literally meaning "son of barrel maker". Notable people with the surname include:

- Anastasia Bodnaruk
- Vira Bodnaruk (born 1939), Ukrainian diaspora art critic, public figure, and writer
