= Anna-Maja Kazarian =

Dutch chess player and Twitch streamer (born 2000)

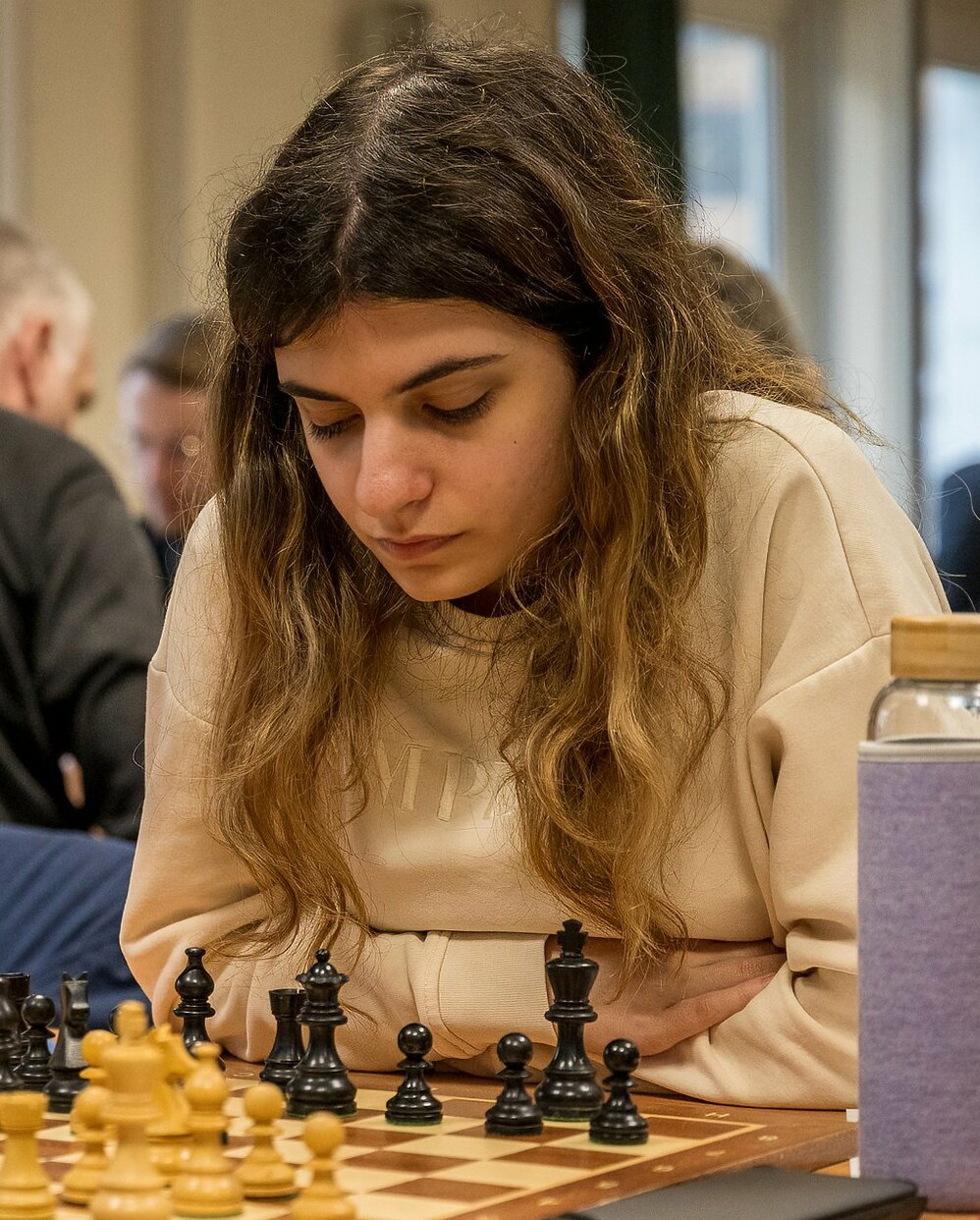
- Kazarian in 2023

Personal information
- Born: 7 January 2000 (age 26) Heerenveen, Netherlands

Chess career
- Country: Netherlands
- Title: FIDE Master (2015); Woman Grandmaster (2026)
- FIDE rating: 2295 (October 2026)
- Peak rating: 2334 (January 2026)

Twitch information
- Channel: annamaja
- Years active: 2020–present
- Genre: Gaming
- Game: Chess
- Followers: 38,000
- Last updated: 9 January 2024

Anna-Maja Kazarian (born 7 January 2000) is a Dutch chess player and Twitch live streamer who holds the title of Woman Grandmaster (WGM). She was the 2020 Dutch Women's Internet Chess Champion and has also been an under-16 girls' European Youth Champion. Kazarian has a peak FIDE rating of 2334, which she achieved in 2026. She has represented the Netherlands at the Chess Olympiad and the European Team Chess Championship.

Kazarian began playing chess at age six after being introduced to the game by her grandfather in Georgia, and began competing a year later. She had success in the European Youth Chess Championships, finishing runner-up in the under-12 girls' division in 2012 and winning the under-16 girls' division in 2015, the latter of which was also her first Woman International Master (WIM) norm. Kazarian has performed well in national team competitions, earning her two remaining WIM norms in her first two national team appearances, one at the 2015 European Team Chess Championship where she also won an individual bronze medal and the other at the 2016 Chess Olympiad. Kazarian won the inaugural Dutch Women's Internet Chess Championship in 2020, defeating Machteld van Foreest in the knockout final. She earned her first Woman Grandmaster (WGM) norm in the 2023–24 Dutch League with a career-best performance rating of 2410.

Kazarian began streaming on Twitch in early 2020, focusing on chess content. She is signed with the Alliance esports organization.

== Early life and background ==
Anna-Maja Kazarian was born on 7 January 2000 in Heerenveen in the northern part of the Netherlands. Her family is originally from Tbilisi, the capital of Georgia. She first became interested in chess at age six while on her summer holiday in Georgia. Her grandfather taught her a variety of games and Kazarian chose chess as her favourite over draughts and backgammon. Before leaving Georgia, her family sought out lessons from a local player Revaz Topuria, who recognized her talent for the game. When she returned to the Netherlands, she joined the chess club in Sneek. Kazarian competed in her first tournament at age seven in Waalwijk. By the time she was 15 years old, she relocated to The Hague. She has not had longterm professional coaching, instead working with her mother who has acted as her travelling coach. Kazarian had a lot of success in Dutch youth and junior championships, winning a total of 25 national championships across many different divisions. She has called Maaike Keetman, who has since become a Woman FIDE Master (WFM), her biggest rival in these youth competitions.

== Chess career ==
=== 2010–14: Under-12 European silver medal ===
Kazarian's earliest FIDE-rated tournaments were youth national, continental, and world championships in 2010 and 2011. She reached a rating of 1700 for the first time at 11 years old with a good performance in the under-20 girls' division at the 2011 Dutch Youth Chess Championships. She finished in joint third place with a score of 5/8 (Note: 5 points in 8 games. (A win is 1 point, a draw is a ½ point, and a loss is 0 points.)) against much stronger opponents with an average rating of 1891. She built on that success later in the year in the under-12 division of the European Youth Chess Championships in Albena, finishing in joint fifth place with 6½/9.

To start 2012, Kazarian crossed a rating of 1800 after finishing in third place in the ten-player 3L group at the Tata Steel Chess Tournament. Her other best results of 2012 came in the second half of the year. At the European Youth Chess Championships in Prague, she improved on her success from the previous year by winning the silver medal in the under-12 division. She finished in joint first with Anastasia Avramidou with 7½/9, but ended up in second place because of a weaker Sonneborn-Berger tiebreak. She had also lost their head-to-head encounter in the penultimate round. Nonetheless, with this result, she earned the Woman FIDE Master (WFM) title. Kazarian also finished in the top ten in the same division of the World Youth Chess Championship at the end of the year. She scored 8/11, placing her in sixth overall. In between the European and World Championships, Kazarian also performed well at the much-higher-level 2012 Unive Open. As one of just seven competitors in the 78-player field rated under 2000, she scored 4/9 against opponents with an average rating of 2138 to gain 37 rating points, her second-largest rating jump of the year behind only the Tata Steel tournament. She finished 2012 with a rating of 1950.

Kazarian moved up to the under-14 girls' divisions of the European and World Youth Championships in 2013. She finished in fifth place as the tenth seed at the former and in eleventh place as the twelfth seed at the latter. After playing few events and thereby maintaining a steady rating in 2013, Kazarian had a more successful 2014. She reached a rating of 2000 for the first time by winning the ten-player 3A group at the Tata Steel Chess Tournament. She scored 7/9 to win by a full point, gaining 41 rating points. In July, Kazarian played the Dutch Women's Chess Championship for the first time at the age of 14. As the lowest-rated competitor in the eight-player round robin, she finished in last place with 2/7. Nonetheless, she still gained 23 rating points because of the large gap in rating between her and the rest of the field. Kazarian's best performance in the rest of the year came at the Dutch Open. Against opponents with an average rating of 2259, she scored 4/9, including three consecutive wins in the early rounds. As a result, she gained 81 rating points to reach 2129, her best at the time and high for the year. Nonetheless, to finish the year, she did not fare well at the European Youth Championships. Although she scored 6/9, she lost to two much lower-rated opponents, causing her to drop 46 rating points overall down to 2062.

=== 2015–16: FM and WIM titles, under-16 European champion ===
Kazarian had one of the best years of her career in 2015, gaining over 200 rating points overall and earning two norms for the Woman International Master (WIM) title towards the end of the year. Although she was the second-lowest rated player in the 2B group at the Tata Steel Chess Tournament, she managed to get an even score of 4½/9 and defeated the second and third-highest rated players in the group. In May, Kazarian won the under-20 girls' youth national championship with a perfect score of 9/9, helping her to return to a rating of 2100. As a second-time participant in the Dutch Women's Chess Championship, she fared much better than the previous year and finished with 4½/7. Unlike in 2014 when she had no wins, she won four games, including one each against Bianca de Jong-Muhren, a Woman Grandmaster (WGM) rated 2329, and Tea Lanchava, an International Master (IM) and former champion rated 2261. With this performance, she gained 89 rating points. Later in the month, Kazarian travelled to New York and played two more tournaments, faring well in both. In particular, she won the under-2200 division of the New York International tournament, finishing tied for first with 6/7 and rising to a rating of 2248.

With a much higher rating, Kazarian entered the under-16 girls' division of the 2015 European Youth Chess Championship in Poreč in Croatia as the second seed behind only Stavroula Tsolakidou, a WIM rated 2279. She won the gold medal, finishing in clear first by a point with 7½/9. During the tournament, she defeated Tsolakidou as well as both the silver and bronze medallists. Overall, she compiled a performance rating of 2359, sufficient for her first WIM norm. After a win in the year-round Dutch Team Competition league the following month, Kazarian became a FIDE Master (FM) by virtue of her unpublished rating crossing the 2300 threshold needed to qualify for the title. She did not reach a published rating of 2300 until the following year, however, as a result of losing a six-game match against Sopiko Guramishvili, a higher-rated Georgian WGM, in a lopsided manner ½–5½. Kazarian closed out the year with a second WIM norm at the European Team Chess Championship.

Kazarian reached a career-best rating of 2320 in April 2016 after performing well at the Reykjavik Open, one of the world's leading open tournaments, and the high-profile Grenke Chess Open. In particular, she scored 6½/10 in Reykjavik, highlighted by a win against Björn Thorfinnsson, an Icelandic IM rated 2410. Since that peak, Kazarian's rating has steadily declined. In the middle of the year, she had even scores at both the open under-20 youth national championship and the overall women's national championships, underperforming based on her rating in both instances. Nonetheless, she had a strong finish to the year highlighted by achieving her third and final WIM norm at the 2016 Baku Olympiad. She was officially awarded the WIM title in 2017. Kazarian was also in contention to win the under-16 division of the World Youth Chess Championship in Khanty-Mansiysk. She entered the last round in joint first with Aakanksha Hagawane at 8/10, but lost her last game to Mobina Alinasab while Aakanksha was able to win. As a result, Kazarian finished in fourth place.

=== 2017–present: National internet champion, first WGM norm ===
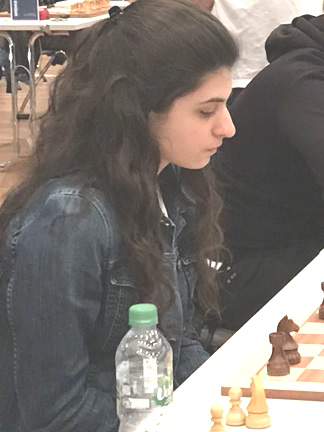
Kazarian in 2019

Over about the next two years through early 2019, Kazarian maintained a rating of around 2200 before dropping just below 2100 by the end of 2019. At the Dutch Women's Chess Championship in 2017, she defeated Peng Zhaoqin in the last round, her first victory against a Grandmaster (GM). Her worst performance of 2017 came at the Maccabia International IM-B, where her rating fell from the mid-2200s to below 2200. Kazarian was able to return to a 2200 rating with more positive results in the second half of 2018 at the Leiden Chess Tournament in the Netherlands and the Open Brasschaat in Belgium, scoring 5/9 and 6½/9 for a combined rating gain of 53 points. She drew three players rated above 2500, all of whom had the GM title, to start the tournament in Leiden. Nonetheless, she fell to a rating of 2096 by December 2019 primarily due to her performances at the Kragero Resort Chess Title in Norway and the Dutch Open that year.

Kazarian did not enter another FIDE-rated tournament until August 2021 as few tournaments were being played due to the COVID-19 pandemic. Nonetheless, during the pandemic, Kazarian entered the first Dutch Women's Internet Chess Championship in November 2020, which was played in a blitz time control of 3+3. (Note: 3 minutes, plus 3 additional seconds with each move) There were eight players in the tournament, six of whom qualified through their FIDE rating and two who won qualifying events, namely Kazarian and Machteld van Foreest. Despite being the lowest-rated player in the field, Kazarian won the tournament, which featured several former Dutch women's champions including Peng Zhaoqin and Anne Haast. The tournament was played in a three-round knockout format and all seven of the matches were won by the lower-rated player. Kazarian defeated Nargiz Umudova and Marlies Bensdorp-De Labaca in the first two rounds. In the final, which featured the two qualifiers, Kazarian defeated van Foreest 5–2 for the title.

At the World Blitz Chess Championship 2023 Kazarian was fined 100 Euro and given a yellow card for wearing shoes that were deemed incompatible with FIDE's dress code.

Kazarian earned her first WGM norm in 2024 in the 2023–24 Dutch League, going undefeated with a score of 6/9 over a span of eight months. During the league, her strongest win was against Jasel Lopez, an International Master rated 2382. She won her last two games, including the final one against Tobias Kabos, rated 2301, to clinch the norm. During the Sharjah Challengers the following month, Kazarian defeated Abdelrahman Hesham, a GM rated 2391, which was her second-ever victory against a Grandmaster.

In December 2025, Kazarian achieved a first International Master (IM) norm at the London Chess Classic Open. In the tournament, she defeated IMs Nicolas Brunner and Wang Hao and drew with Grandmasters (GM) Eldar Gasanov and Alon Greenfeld, in the final round after 111 moves by holding with a rook versus rook and bishop, ultimately scoring 5.5/9 for a performance rating of 2485.

== National representation ==
=== Chess Olympiad ===
Kazarian represented the Netherlands at one Women's Chess Olympiad that was held in Baku, Azerbaijan in 2016. She played on the fourth board behind Peng, Haast, and Lanchava. The Netherlands finished in 21st place out of 134 teams with a score of 14 points (+7–4=0). (Note: 7 wins, 4 losses, 0 draws) Individually, Kazarian performed well, scoring 5/10 and earning her last WIM norm. On July 20, 2024, she was confirmed as a member of the Dutch women team for the 45th Chess Olympiad hosted in Budapest.

=== European Team Chess Championship ===
Kazarian has also represented the Netherlands at two European Team Chess Championships, playing on the reserve board in both instances. In 2015 in Reykjavík, she played behind Peng, Haast, de Jong-Muhren, and Lanchava. The team finished in the middle at 15th place out of 30 teams with a score of 9 points (+4–4=1). Although Kazarian was on the reserve board, she had the opportunity to play eight games, the second-most on the team. She had one of the best performances of her career, scoring 6/8 and gaining 34 rating points. With a performance rating of 2324, she also earned her second WIM norm and won the bronze medal on the reserve board behind Polish WGM Joanna Majdan-Gajewska and Italian WFM Alessia Santeramo. In 2017 in Crete, Kazarian had less opportunity to play as the four boards were covered by Peng, Haast, Lanchava, and Iozefina Păuleţ. She scored 2/5 as the Netherlands managed a similar result to 2015, again finishing with 9 points (+4–4=1) to place them 14th out of 32 teams.

== Playing style ==
Kazarian has a strong preference for playing 1.e4 (the King's Pawn Game) with the white pieces. With the black pieces, she prefers to play the French Defence (1.e4 e6) against 1.e4 or the Slav (1.d4 d5 2.c4 c6) against 1.d4. Kazarian believes the strongest aspect of her game is attacking, which is also her favourite part of the game.

== Personal life ==
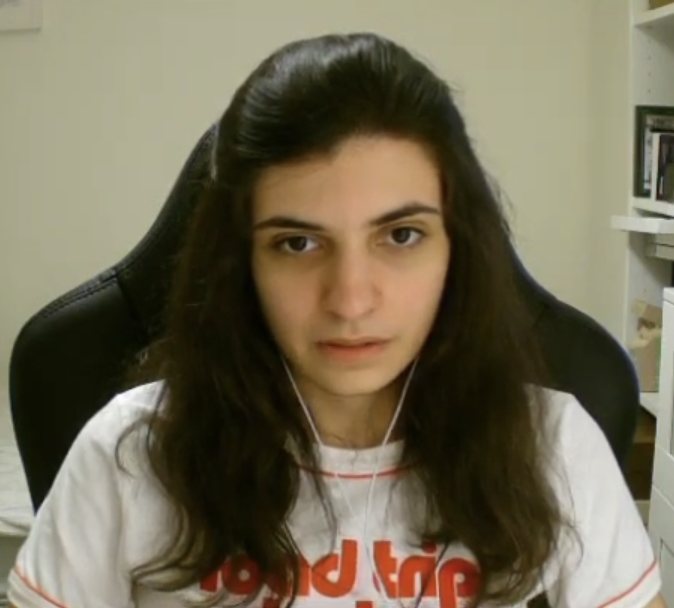
Kazarian streaming in 2020

Kazarian has two sisters. She studied artificial intelligence at the Vrije Universiteit Amsterdam. Kazarian has also hosted her own Twitch channel since February 2020 that focuses on chess. Towards the end of 2021, she signed with the Alliance esports organisation.

In late 2020, Kazarian joined the Stichting ChessQueens (ChessQueens Foundation), an organization run by many of the leading women's chess players in the Netherlands with the goals of supporting the top women's players in the country and more broadly to encourage the participation of Dutch women and girls in chess.

In late 2022, Kazarian competed in the Dutch version of The Genius.

On June 15th, 2026, Kazarian announced she got married.

== Notable games ==
- Irina Drogovoz (2253) – Anna-Maja Kazarian (2259), 2016 European Youth Chess Championship (under-16 girls' division): Round 5; Slav defence, 0–1. Kazarian described this game against Drogovoz, who she had lost to two years earlier, as the best of her career. After this win, Kazarian also won the tournament, one point ahead of Drogovoz, who finished in second place. Translations of Kazarian's annotations from Dutch are included below.
Drogovoz vs. Kazarian, Prague 2016

Position: g1 white king, a1 white rook, h2 white pawn, g2 white pawn, e2 white rook, b2 white bishop, a2 white pawn, d3 white bishop, b3 white pawn, f4 black queen, d4 black pawn, c4 white pawn, d5 black pawn, g6 black pawn, e6 white queen, b6 black pawn, h7 black pawn, f7 black rook, e7 black bishop, b7 black bishop, a7 black pawn, g8 black king, f8 black rook

Position after 21. Re1 Qf4 22. Qxe6+ Rf7 23. Re2 Rf8

1. d4 d5 2. c4 c6 ("The Slav") 3. Nf3 Nf6 4. e3 e6 5. Nbd2 Nbd7 6. b3 b6 7. Bb2 Bb7 8. Bd3 Be7 9. O-O O-O 10. Qc2 c5 11. Ne5 cxd4 12. exd4 Rc8 13. Ndf3 g6 14. Qe2 Nxe5 15. Nxe5 Ne4 16. Rfd1 f6 ("This move made sense to me during the game, but in retrospect it was a bit weakening. Better was a healthy move like 16... Bd6.") 17. f3 fxe5 18. fxe4 exd4 19. Qg4 ("Better was 19.exd5 exd5 20.Qe6+ Rf7 21.Bxd4 with an equal position.") Qd6 20. e5 ("Gives away a pawn without any compensation. 20.exd5 exd5 21.Rf1 and the position is in balance.") Qxe5 21. Re1 Qf4 22. Qxe6+ Rf7 23. Re2 ("Makes sense, but 23.Rf1 is a lot better. The black queen is in a very good position and must therefore be attacked.") Rf8 24. Rd1 Bd6 25. g3 ("It looks like black is going to lose the bishop on d6, but the continuation shows that there is a discoverable mate on the way.") Qf3 26. c5 Bc8 27. Qxd6 Bh3 28. Red2 Qf1+ 0–1 ("Resigned. After 29.Bxf1 or Rxf1, Rxf1 follows 30.Rxf1 or Bxf1 and Rxf1 mate.")
