= Murali Reddy Saritha =

Indian chess player

Saritha Reddy
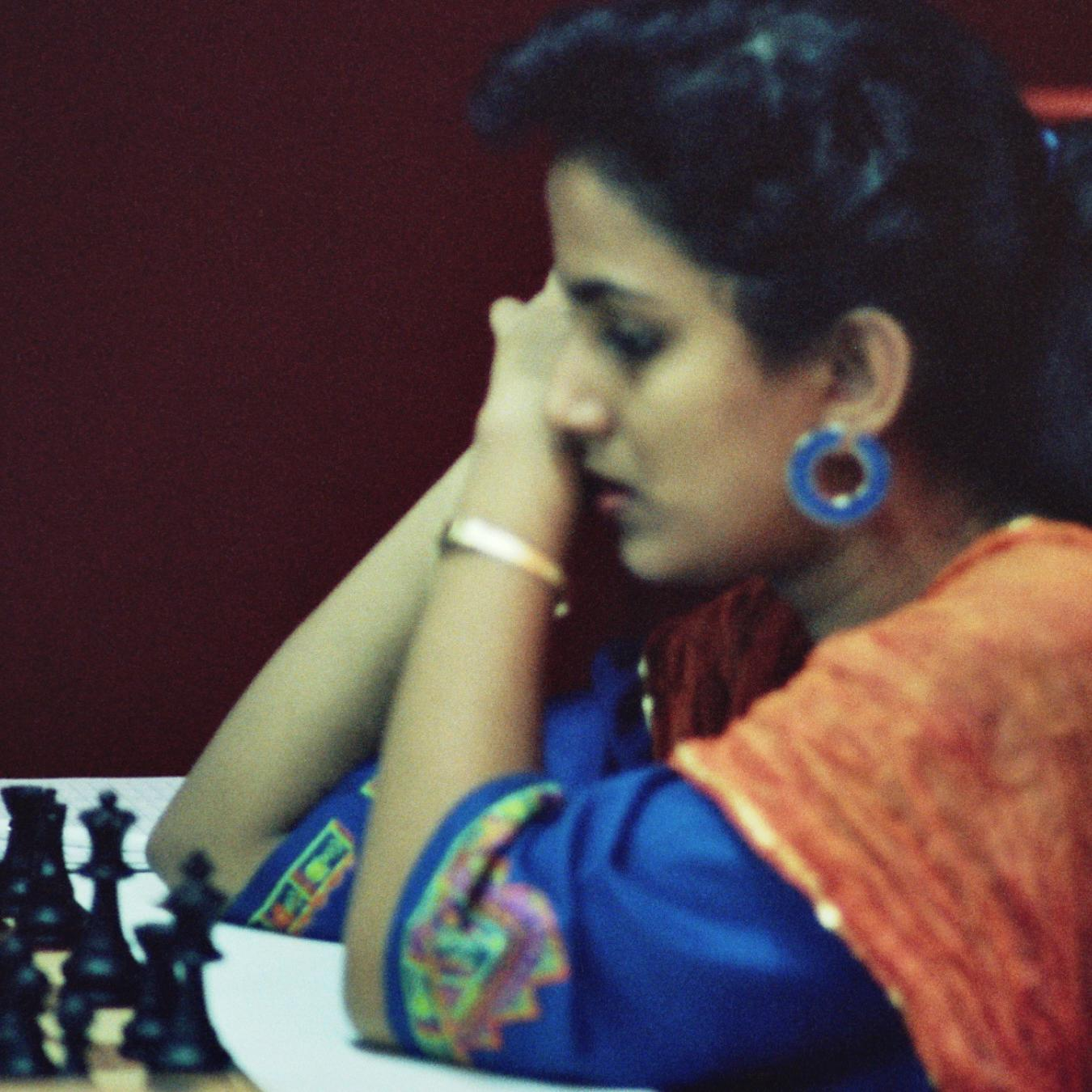
- Saritha Reddy in 1992

Personal information
- Born: 10 June 1972 (age 54)

Chess career
- Country: India
- Title: Woman International Master (1990)
- Peak rating: 2235 (January 1998)

Murali Reddy Saritha (born 10 June 1972) is an Indian chess player who holds the title of Woman International Master (1990). She won the Indian Women's Chess Championship in 1987. She holds the distinction of winning National Premier Chess Championship, National Junior Girls Chess Championship (India) and Indian Youth Chess Championship (Sub Junior category) in 1987.

== Biography ==
Saritha Reddy won the Indian Women's Chess Championship in 1987 at the age of 15.

Reddy played for India in the Women's Chess Olympiads:

- In 1990, at first reserve board in the 29th Chess Olympiad (women) in Novi Sad (+4, =3, -4),
- In 1992, at second board in the 30th Chess Olympiad (women) in Manila (+3, =3, -5),
- In 1994, at first reserve board in the 31st Chess Olympiad (women) in Moscow (+2, =0, -4),
- In 1996, at third board in the 32nd Chess Olympiad (women) in Yerevan (+6, =0, -4).

In 1990, she was awarded the FIDE Women International Master (WIM) title.

After 1999, Saritha Reddy rarely participated in chess tournaments. Subsequently, she worked as a chess coach in Bangalore.
