= Delhi Public School, Jammu =

Delhi Public school in Jammu, India (DPS Jammu)

Delhi Public School
- DPS Jammu

Location
- Maharaja Hari Singh Marg; Jammu, Jammu and Kashmir; India; 32°43′35″N 74°51′58″E

Information
- Other name: DPS Jammu
- Type: Private school
- Motto: Service Before Self
- Established: 1998
- Founders: Ajatshatru Singh and Kuwarani Ritu Singh
- School board: CBSE
- School district: Jammu
- Authority: Delhi Public School Society
- Chairperson: Ajatshatru Singh
- Principal: Ruchi Chabra
- Head teacher: Meenu Gupta
- Faculty: 231
- Gender: Co-Educational
- Age range: 3 - 16 Years
- Enrollment: 4284 Students
- Classes offered: Pre-nursery to class XII
- Language: English
- Campus size: 11.20 Acres
- Campus type: Urban
- Affiliation: CBSE
- Website: https://dpsjammu.in

Delhi Public School, Jammu commonly known as DPS Jammu (established in 1998), is a co-educational day and private boarding school affiliated with the CBSE. Operated by the Delhi Public School Society, it serves students from Pre-nursery to class XII. Situated in the city of Jammu, it is the inaugural branch of the DPS Society in Jammu & Kashmir.

== History ==
Founded in 1998 by the president of 'Rajput Charitable Trust' (RCT), Ajastshatru Singh and his wife Kr. Ritu Singh, Delhi Public School, Jammu, is the first branch of the Delhi Public School Society in Jammu & Kashmir.

== Location ==
DPS Jammu is located on Maharaja Hari Singh Marg, Residency Road, Jammu.

== Campus ==
The main campus, spanning 11.20 acres, includes classrooms, science and computer labs, a 13,924-square-meter playground, a library with over 24,000 books, and a clinic with a resident doctor. Additionally, the school offers as a swimming pool, indoor games area, dance rooms, and music rooms. Furthermore, a fleet of approximately 50 buses serves extensive city areas.

== Academics ==
The school follows the Central Board of Secondary Education system offering education from pre-nursery to class XII. It employs a four-cycle test assessment pattern for classes I to VIII, issuing detailed report cards with subject grades.

The school consistently secures top rankings, notably being acknowledged as the leading CBSE School in Jammu city. In September 2018, it received the Excellence in School Leadership and Leaders – Pillars in Education award in the North Schools CBSE category at the North Educator's Summit & Merit Awards in New Delhi. It received the 'Best in Academic Excellence' Award for ICT implementation and Sports Education from Brainfeed for the academic years 2018-2019 and 2019–2020.

In December 2018, it received the International School Award and British Council accreditation for the academic session 2017–18, spanning from 2018 to 2021. The school's nomination in 2019 for India's Top 50 Prestigious Jury Awards resulted in it receiving the 'Great Legacy in Education (K-12)' award at the Maharashtra Educators Summit-2019 in Mumbai.

In 2021, its students achieved a Guinness World Record for the 'Most People Assembling Sundial Kit' during the 6th Indian International Science Festival. The event was organized virtually by the Ministry of Science and Technology, Ministry of Earth Science, and Vijnana Bharati.

Extracurricular activities

The school offers a diverse array of extra and co-curricular activities such as singing, dancing, dramatics, debates, elocution, and various sports.

== Education system ==
The school follows the Central Board of Secondary Education system.

== Governance ==
Delhi Public School, Jammu is operated by the Delhi Public School Society as a franchised institution. It is led by Principal Ms. Ruchi Chabra, with Ajatshatru Singh as President, Kuwarani Ritu Singh as Pro Vice Chairperson, Meenu Gupta as Vice Principal, Ravi Kumar Kotroo as Headmaster, and Umesh Kumar Sharma as Deputy Headmaster. Additionally, Rimpi Sharma and Anu Bali serve as Deputy Headmistress and Coordinator/Supervisor, respectively.

== Incidents ==
On 4 December 2023, the Jammu and Kashmir Police conducted searches at Delhi Public School, Jammu, in response to a reported threat of a potential institution-wide explosion. Accompanied by a bomb disposal squad, the police conducted thorough searches on the premises with students inside. Subsequently, the reported threat was confirmed to be a hoax, and no explosive material was discovered during the extensive searches.

== Notable alumni ==
- Soham Kamotra (Chess Player)
