= Varshini =

Varshini may refer to:

- Varshini Prakash, an American climate activist
- Varshini Sounderajan, an Indian actress
- Varshini Venkat, an Indian actress
- V. Varshini, an Indian chess player
