= Alexandra Obolentseva =

Russian chess player (born 2001)

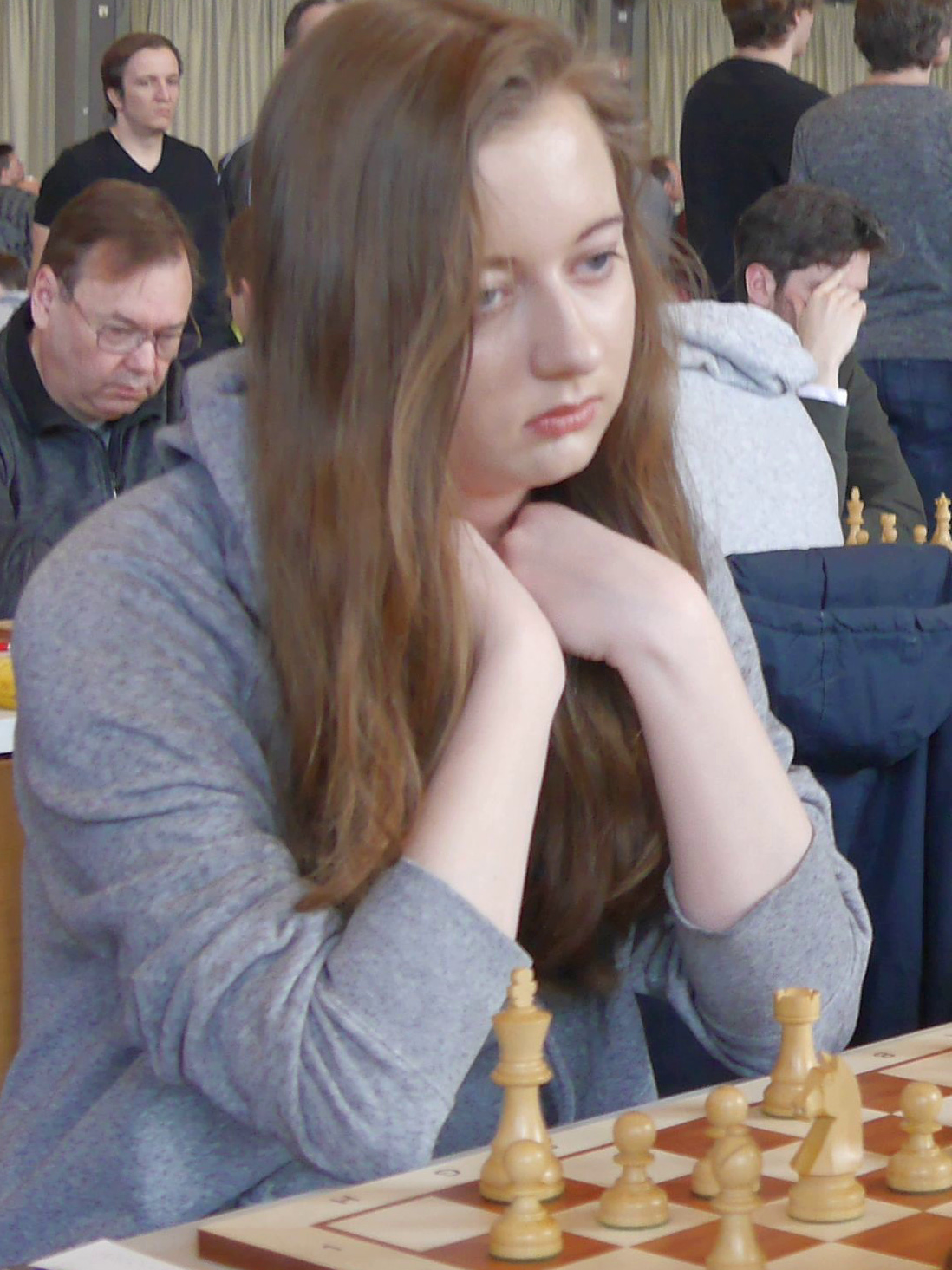
- Alexandra Obolentseva, 2018

Personal information
- Born: Alexandra Sergeevna Obolentseva; 21 June 2001 (age 25) Tula, Russia

Chess career
- Country: Russia
- Title: Woman Grandmaster (2018)
- Peak rating: 2364 (September 2017)

Alexandra Sergeevna Obolentseva (Russian: Александра Серге́евна Оболенцева; born 21 June 2001) is a Russian chess player. She was awarded the title Woman Grandmaster by FIDE in 2018. Obolentseva has won the World Youth Chess Championships, the World Schools Chess Championships and the European Schools Chess Championships in her age girls category.

== Career ==
Obolentseva began playing chess in September 2007 at six years of age, in the Sport School No. 4 of Tula. Her coach was Nikolai Mikhailovich Golovin. She won the Russian Youth Championships three times, in the categories girls U8 in 2009, girls U10 in 2011, and girls U12 in 2012.

In 2009, by finishing first in an event for children at the 6th International Chess Festival "Moscow Open", she qualified to play in the World School Chess Championships in Thessaloniki, Greece. In this event, Obolentseva took fifth place in the Girls Under 9 division, and first place in the Under 8 subgroup.

In 2010, in the 6th World School Chess Championships in Kayseri, Turkey, Obolentseva came in second place on tie-break in the girls U9 section, losing out to Khanim Balajayeva from Azerbaijan. At the World Youth Championships 2010 in Halkidiki, Greece, under the guidance of her new coach, Vladimir Vulfson, she finished third in the girls U10 division. As a result, FIDE awarded her the title Woman Candidate Master.

In November 2011, at the World Youth Championships in Caldas Novas, Brazil, she took the gold medal to become the girls under 10 world champion. As a result, she was awarded the title Woman FIDE Master. In 2012, she won the girls under 11 event of the World School Championships in Iași, Romania, and took the bronze medal at the European Youth Chess Championships in Prague in the girls under 12 category.

In 2013, she played for Russia's second team in the girls' section of the European Youth Team Championship in Maribor, Solovenia. In 2014 Obolentseva won the girls U13 event of the European School Chess Championships in Kavala, Greece. In 2015, she won the European Schools Championship in the Girls Under 15 division, and took the bronze medal in the Girls Under 14 event at the European Youth Championship.

In February 2016, she shared first place with Anastasia Bodnaruk and Soumya Swaminathan in the women's event of the Moscow Open, finishing third on tiebreak. She also earned a norm for the title of International Master (IM) thanks to her rating performance of 2548. In June, she won the girls U15 event at the European School Chess Championship in Halkidiki. The following month, she played for the silver medal-winning Russian team in the World Youth U16 Chess Olympiad in Poprad, Slovakia. In October, Obolentseva took silver in the Girls U18 event at the World Youth Championships in Khanty-Mansyisk. In 2017 she competed again in the World Youth U16 Olympiad for Russia and her team won the gold medal. The next year, she took silver again in the Girls U18 section at the World Youth Championships in Halkidiki. In October 2019, she won bronze medal in World Youth Chess Championship in girl's U18 age group.

Alexandra won 2018/2019 and 2019/2021 editions of Frauen-Bundesliga with SC Bad Königshofen. In May 2023, she won Russian Women's Team Championship with Moscow Chess Team.

In June 2025, Alexandra participated in Singapore's 64th National Xiangqi (Chinese Chess) Individual Tournament Women's Category followed by the "B" Category (Open). She won 4th place with 13 points, hence promoted to be a B-ranked Xiangqi player.
