= Shubhi Gupta =

Indian chess player (born 2010)

Personal information
- Born: 27 August 2010 (age 16) Ghaziabad, Uttar Pradesh, India

Chess career
- Country: India
- Title: Woman FIDE Master (2023)
- Peak rating: 2426 (June 2026)

Shubhi Gupta (born 2010) is an Indian chess player who holds the FIDE title of Woman FIDE Master (WFM). She is a two time National Junior Girls Chess Championship (India) winner.

== Career ==
- Gold Medal at the National Junior Girls Chess Championship (India) twice in 2023 and 2025
- Gold Medal in Under-12 category at the World Cadet Chess Championship at Batumi, Georgia
- She clinched the girls U-16 gold and girls U-20 bronze medals in the just-concluded Commonwealth Chess Championships in Kalutara, Sri Lanka.
- Fourth place finish at the 51st National Women's Chess Championship 2025 held at Durgapur in West Bengal.

Awards and achievements
Preceded by Rakshitta Ravi	National Junior Girls Chess Champion; 2023	Succeeded by Mrittika Mallick
Preceded by Mrittika Mallick	National Junior Girls Chess Champion; 2025	Succeeded by Incumbent
