= Ivana Maria Furtado =

Indian chess player (born 1999)

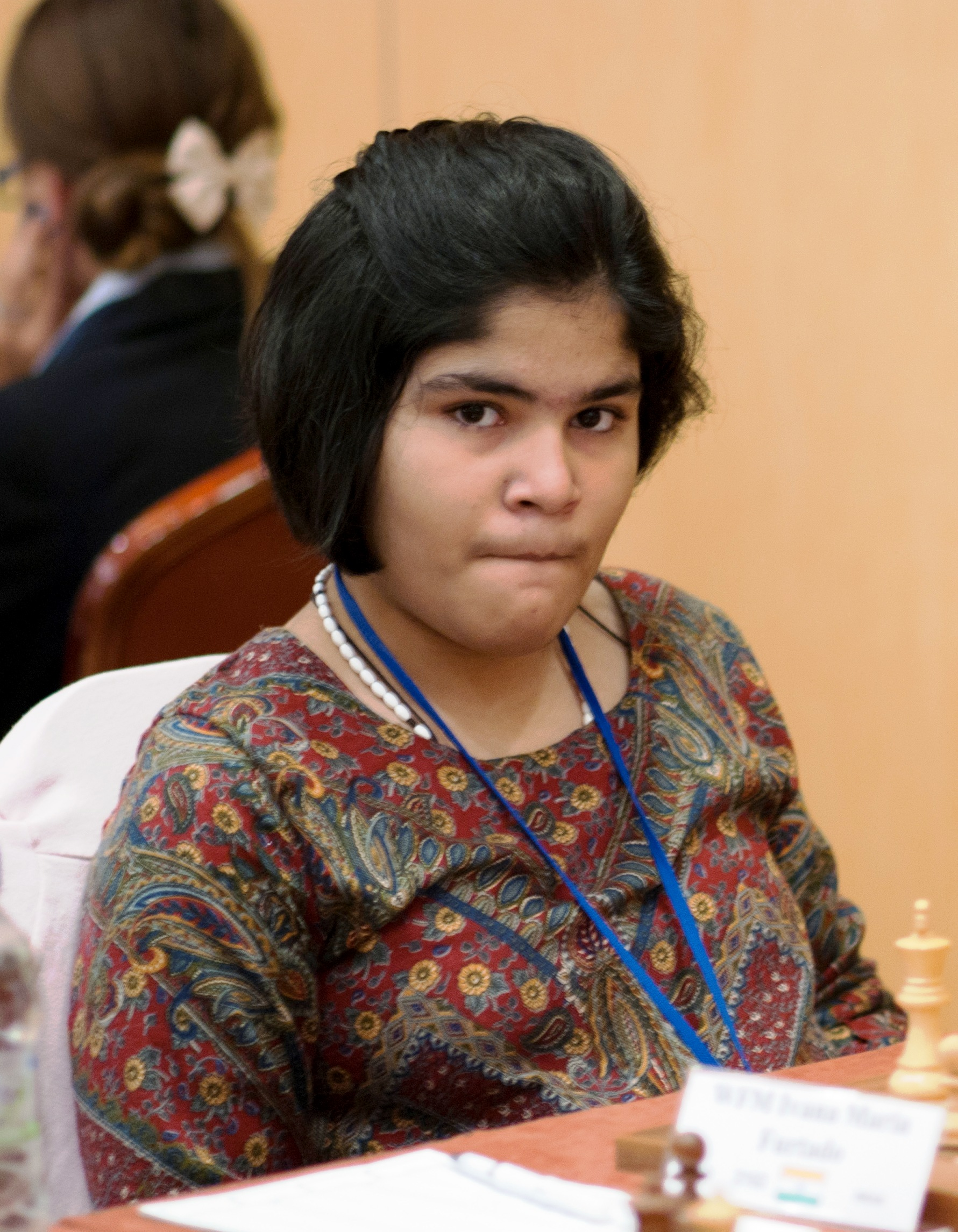
- Furtado in 2012

Personal information
- Born: 16 March 1999 (age 27) Goa, India

Chess career
- Country: India
- Title: Woman International Master (2012)
- Peak rating: 2277 (November 2015)

Ivana Maria Furtado (born 16 March 1999) is a chess prodigy from Goa, India. She won the Under-8 World Youth Chess Championship twice in a row in 2006 and 2007, and won second place in the 2009 Under-10. Her FIDE Elo rating as of March 2019 is 2139, and she holds the FIDE title of Woman International Master (WIM).

Ivana won gold in the Under 12 category at the Commonwealth Chess Championship 2009 in Singapore on 14 December 2009.

She became Woman FIDE Master in 2011 and became a Woman International Master in June 2012.

She got her first Woman Grandmaster norm by winning the Girls title at the Asian Junior Chess Championship, Tashkent in June 2012. She won the 28th edition of National Junior Girls Chess Championship (India) in July 2013 held in Uttar Pradesh.
