= Nutakki Priyanka =

Indian chess player (born 2002)

Personal information
- Born: 1 June 2002 (age 24) Kanuru, Vijayawada, Krishna District, Andhra Pradesh, India

Chess career
- Country: India
- Title: Woman Grandmaster (2022)
- Peak rating: 2355 (May 2024)

Nutakki Priyanka (born 1 June 2002) is an Indian chess player. She received the FIDE title of Woman Grandmaster (WGM) in 2022.

== Biography ==
Nutakki Priyanka is winner of Indian Youth Chess Championship in different girl's age groups: U9 (2011), U11 (2013), and U13 (2015). In 2012, she won the Asian Youth Chess Championship for girls in the U10 age group and World Youth Chess Championship for girls in the U10 age group.

In August 2018, she was the best among women in the "Riga Technical University Open" tournament "A".

In 2022, she won the National Junior Girls Chess Championship (India). In 2022, she was expelled from the World Junior Chess Championship for accidentally carrying earbuds into the playing hall.

She qualified for the Women's Chess World Cup 2023, where she defeated Marina Brunello in the first round, before being defeated by compatriot Koneru Humpy.

Awards and achievements
Preceded by Savitha Shri Baskar	National Junior Girls Chess Champion; 2022	Succeeded by Rakshitta Ravi
