= Aaryan Varshney =

Indian chess grandmaster (born 2005)

Personal information
- Born: April 7, 2005 (age 21) Delhi, India

Chess career
- Country: India
- Title: Grandmaster (2026)
- FIDE rating: 2502 (October 2026)
- Peak rating: 2538 (April 2026)

Aaryan Varshney is an Indian chess grandmaster.

== Career ==
Aaryan began learning chess at the age of 7 from his single father Gaurav, who served as his primary trainer. Prior to becoming a Grandmaster, Aaryan never attended any chess academies and did not work with coaches, or books.

In December 2025, he won the Bhilwara Rating Open with a perfect score of 9/9, which was 1.5 points ahead of the rest of the field.

In January 2026, he won the Andranik Margaryan Memorial after drawing against grandmaster Jegor Lashkin in the final round. He also became India's 92nd Grandmaster through this result.
