= Andrey Gorovets =

Belarusian chess grandmaster (born 1987)

Personal information
- Born: 14 September 1987 (age 39) Vitebsk, Belarus

Chess career
- Country: Belarus
- Title: Grandmaster (2017)
- Peak rating: 2551 (June 2016)

Andrey Gorovets (born 14 September 1987) is a Belarusian chess player who was awarded the title of Grandmaster (GM) by FIDE in 2017.

== Chess career ==
Born in Belarus, Gorovets learned to play chess at the age of six. He later studied in the United States and graduated from Texas Tech University, competing for the university's chess team.

In June 2016, Gorovets achieved his peak FIDE rating of 2551, as well as a peak USCF rating of 2645. In both 2014 and 2015, he ranked among the top ten most victorious players in U.S. Grand Prix events.

Throughout his career, Gorovets has finished first or tied for first in several tournaments across the United States. His major tournament victories include the 2013 U.S. Class Championship in Houston, the 2014 U.S. National G-30 and G-60 Championships in Santa Clara, California, the 2015 Southwest Open in Dallas, the 2015 46th Annual National Chess Congress in Philadelphia, and the 2015 Pan-American Intercollegiate Team Chess Championship in Cleveland as a member of the Texas Tech University team. He also won or shared first place at the 2017 10th New York International Championship, the 2017 Manhattan Open in New York City, and the 2018 Washington State Open Championship.
