= Eldar Gasanov =

Ukrainian chess grandmaster (born 1982)

Personal information
- Born: 26 September 1982 (age 43) Kharkiv, Ukrainian SSR, Soviet Union

Chess career
- Country: Ukraine
- Title: Grandmaster (2007)
- FIDE rating: 2443 (July 2026)
- Peak rating: 2553 (January 2009)

Eldar Gasanov (born 26 September 1982) is a Ukrainian chess player who holds the FIDE title of Grandmaster (2007). Gasanov graduated from University of Kharkiv. He is working as one of the trainers of Chesskidz LLP.

== Chess career ==
- 2002 - Winner of Ukrainian championship under 20
- 2004 - Winner of Grandmaster round-robin tournament in Tula, Russia
- 2005 - Tied 1st place in Abkhazia Open
- 2006 - Tied 2nd place in President Cup, Azerbaijan
- 2007 - Tied 2nd place in Istanbul Open, Turkey
- 2007 - Tied II-IV places in Ukrainian Championship
- 2008 - Winner of the Czech Open 2008 in Pardubice, Czech Republic.
- 2017 - Tied 1st place in 15th Festival Scacchistico Internazionale "Città di Amantea", Italy.
- 2018 - Tied for 1st place in Prague Summer Open A
- 2018 - Tied for 1st place in XXXVIII Festival Internazionale "Conca della Presolana", Italy Bratto
