= Bhakti Kulkarni =

Indian chess player (born 1992)

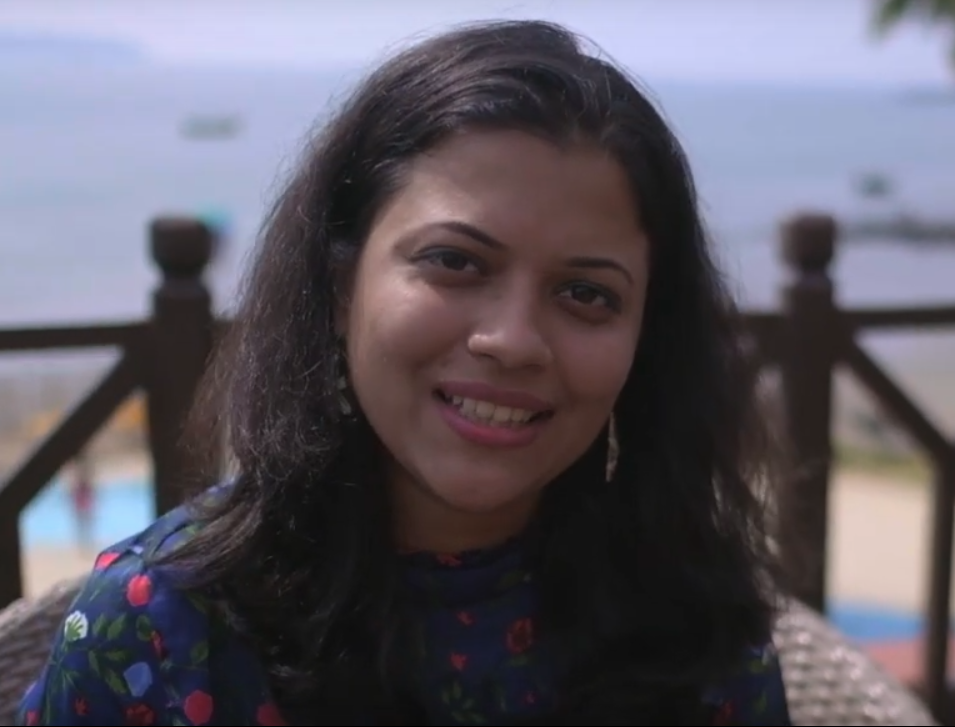
- Kulkarni in 2021

Personal information
- Born: 19 May 1992 (age 34) Goa, India

Chess career
- Country: India
- Title: International Master (2019); Woman Grandmaster (2012)
- Peak rating: 2429 (August 2019)

Bhakti Kulkarni (born 19 May 1992) is an Indian chess player. She received the FIDE titles of Woman Grandmaster (WGM) in 2012 and International Master (IM) in 2019. She won the women's edition of National Premier Chess Championship in both 2018 and 2019 consecutively. She is a recipient of the Arjuna Award for her contribution to chess.

== Biography ==
She won the National Junior Girls Chess Championship (India) twice in 2007 and 2009. In 2011, she won the Asian Junior Chess Championship. In 2013, she finished first at the international women's chess tournament in Czech Republic — Open Vysočina. In 2016, she won the Asian Chess Women Championship.

She played for the Indian team in the Women's Asian Team Chess Championship, in which she participated twice (2009, 2016). In the individual competition she won the bronze medal (2009).

Awards and achievements
Preceded by Mitra Hejazipour	Women's Asian Chess Champion; 2016	Succeeded by Vo Thi Kim Phung
Preceded by Soumya Swaminathan (chess player)	National Junior Girls Chess Champion; 2007	Succeeded by Soumya Swaminathan (chess player)
Preceded by Soumya Swaminathan (chess player)	National Junior Girls Chess Champion; 2009	Succeeded by Padmini Rout
