= Padmini Rout =

Indian chess player (born 1994)

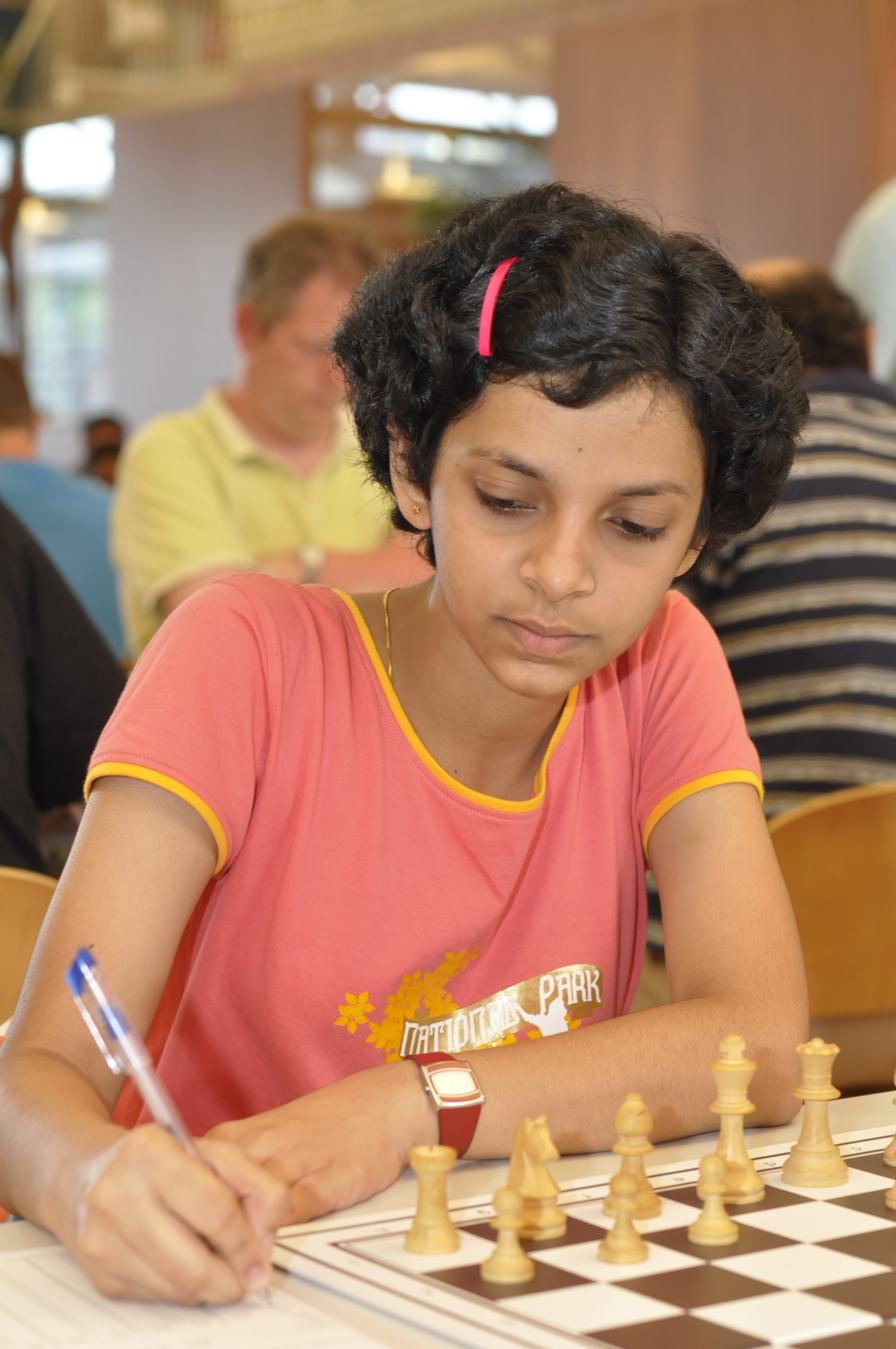

Personal information
- Born: 5 January 1994 (age 32) Baramba, Odisha, India

Chess career
- Country: India
- Title: International Master (2015); Woman Grandmaster (2010)
- FIDE rating: 2352 (July 2025)
- Peak rating: 2454 (March 2015)

Padmini Rout (born 5 January 1994) is an Indian chess player. She holds the titles of International Master (IM) and Woman Grandmaster (WGM). She has won the National Women's Premier Championship five times, consecutively from 2014 to 2017 and again in 2023, and was the Asian women's champion in 2018.

Rout was honoured with the Biju Patnaik Sports Award for the year 2007 and the Ekalavya Award in 2009.

== Career ==
In 2005, Rout won her first national title, Indian Youth Chess Championship (under-11 girls) at Nagpur. In 2006, she was both the Indian Youth Chess Championship (under-13 girls) champion and the Asian under-12 girls champion. Rout won the U14 girls' section of both Asian and World Youth Chess Championships in 2008. The following year she finished first in the Asian Junior Chess Championship, girls category. In 2008 and 2009, she won silver medal in National Junior Girls Chess Championship (India). In 2010, she won gold medal in National Junior Girls Chess Championship (India) and took the bronze medal at both Asian and World Junior Girls Championships.

In the Asian Individual Women's Championship 2011 she tied for 2nd–6th places and won it in 2018. Rout won the Indian Women's Championship in 2014, 2015, 2016 and 2017. In 2015, she also became the Commonwealth women's champion.

Rout played for the Indian national team at Women's Chess Olympiad, Women's World Team Chess Championship and Women's Asian Team Chess Championship. She won an individual gold medal playing on the reserve board at the 2014 Women's Chess Olympiad in Tromsø, Norway. She has been part of the Indian women's team in the subsequent Chess Olympiads in 2016 at Baku, Azerbaijan and 2018 at Batumi, Georgia. She was part of the second Indian women's team at the Chess Olympiad 2022 in Chennai, India, playing at the second board. The team finished as eight.

== Personal life ==
Born in Barambagarh, Odisha, Padmini started playing chess at the age of 9 (2003) because of her father Dr. Ashok Kumar Rout's passion for the game. She did her schooling from D.A.V. Public School, Chandrasekharpur and graduated in commerce from BJB College in Bhubaneswar. On 28 Jan 2024, Padmini married Jaikishin Mankani in Bhubaneswar.

== Achievements ==
1. Won her first National Indian Youth Chess Championship (under-11 girls) in 2005 at Nagpur and also won National Indian Youth Chess Championship (under-13 girls) in Kolkata.
2. Individual Gold medal for reserve board in Women's in Tromsø Olympiad 2014
3. Gold medal in Asian Continental Women 2018
4. Four-times consecutive National Women's Premier Champion (2014–2017)
5. Gold in Blitz, Silver in both Rapid and Classical format in Asian Nations Cup 2014 for Team India
6. Gold in Blitz, Silver in Rapid and Bronze in Classical format in Asian Nations Cup 2018 for Team India
7. Gold in Asian under-12 girls and under-14 girls in 2006 and 2008 respectively.
8. Gold in Asian Junior (under-20) girls in 2009 and Bronze in 2010.
9. Gold in Commonwealth Women's in 2015.
10. Gold in World Youth under-14 in 2008.
11. Bronze in World Junior 2010.
12. Bronze in Asian Continental Women's Blitz in 2017.
13. Bronze in Asian Indoor Games in Rapid for Team India in 2017.
14. Won National Junior Girls Chess Championship (India) in 2010.
15. Biju Patnaik Sports Award for the year 2007.
16. Winner of Ekalavya Award in 2009.

Awards and achievements
Preceded by Vo Thi Kim Phung	Women's Asian Chess Champion; 2018	Succeeded by Dinara Saduakassova
Preceded by Divya Deshmukh	National Women Chess Champion; 2023	Succeeded by P. V. Nandhidhaa
Preceded by Bhakti Kulkarni	National Junior Girls Chess Champion; 2010	Succeeded by Pon Krithikha
