= Rucha Pujari =

Indian chess player (born 1994)

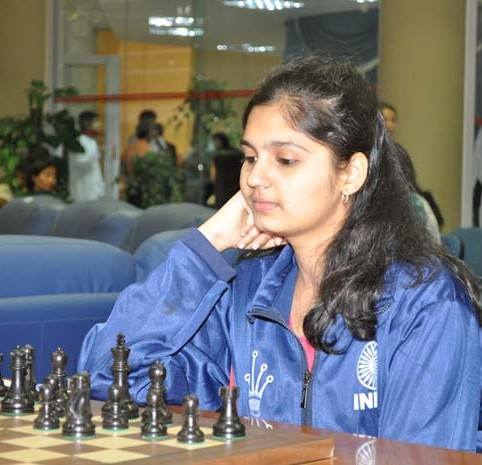
- Pujari in 2013

Personal information
- Born: 2 July 1994 (age 32) Kolhapur, Maharashtra, India

Chess career
- Country: India
- Title: Woman International Master (2017)
- FIDE rating: 2244 (March 2020)
- Peak rating: 2268 (July 2019)

Rucha Pujari (born 2 July 1994) is an Indian chess player. She is currently a Woman International Master and was previously awarded the title of Woman FIDE Master in 2006.

Born in Kolhapur, she picked up the game of chess at the age of six in year 2000 along with her brother. She won her first age-group under-7 state championship in 2001, followed by winning the national under-7 championship in Chennai.

She is a recipient of Shiv Chhatrapati Award, highest sports award honored annually to the players of Maharashtra by the Government of Maharashtra, India.

== Chess career ==
=== World events ===
Pujari has represented India in numerous World Youth Chess Championships including 2009: U-16 girls category held in Antalya-Turkey, and 2012: U-18 girls category held in Slovenia.

She also represented India in one of the major global chess event World Junior Chess Championship twice which were held in Kocaeli, Turkey in 2013 and Pune, India in 2014.

=== Asian events ===
Pujari played her first Asian event when she was nine years old. She represented India in the Asian Youth U-10 Girls Championship which was held in Calicut in the year 2003, where she won a silver medal. Next year she went on to win gold medal in the same event, which was held in Singapore. Along with her individual medal, India also won team gold medal in that event and Pujari claimed the title of Woman FIDE Master (WFM).

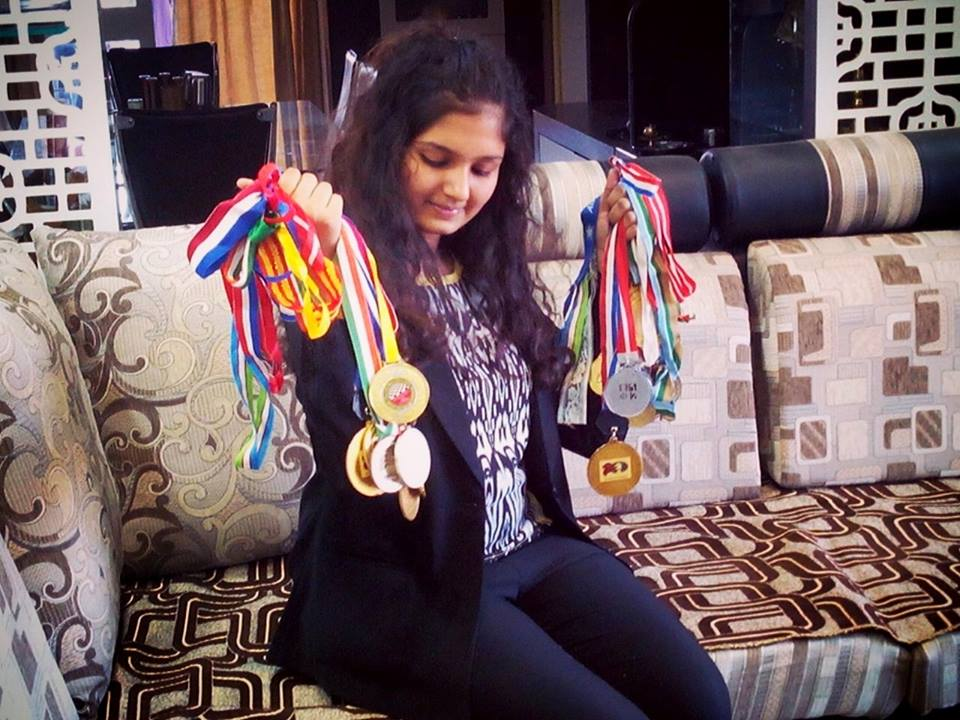
Rucha Pujari with her collection of medals from National, Asian, Commonwealth and World events

In the year 2009, she achieved silver medal in Asian Youth U-16 Girls Championship which was held in New Delhi. Next year she secured bronze medal in the same event, which was held in Beijing, China. Team India won the gold medal in that event.

Her most notable achievement is winning the Asian Youth U-18 Girls Chess Championship which was held in Philippines in the year 2011.

In 2012, Pujari was qualified to play in Asian Junior Girls Chess Championship which was held at Tashkent, Uzbekistan. She performed well, but was defeated in the final game, leaving her with a bronze medal. She achieved her second Woman International Master norm in that tournament. She also secured another bronze medal in the Asian Junior Girls Blitz Chess Championship, which was organised after the classic event. In 2013, she represented India in Asian Junior Girls Chess Championship held in Sharjah, UAE where she secured 7th position.

=== Commonwealth events ===
Rucha has participated in numerous Commonwealth Chess Championships including winning gold in 2006– Mumbai in U-12 girls

She also participated in Commonwealth U-16 Championship which was held in Singapore in the year 2009, where she secured fifth position.

=== National events ===
Pujari participated in the National U-7 Girls Championship which was held at Chennai, and went on to win the tournament claiming her first national title.

In 2008, Pujari won a silver medal in the National Sub-Junior Chess Championship held in Mangalore.

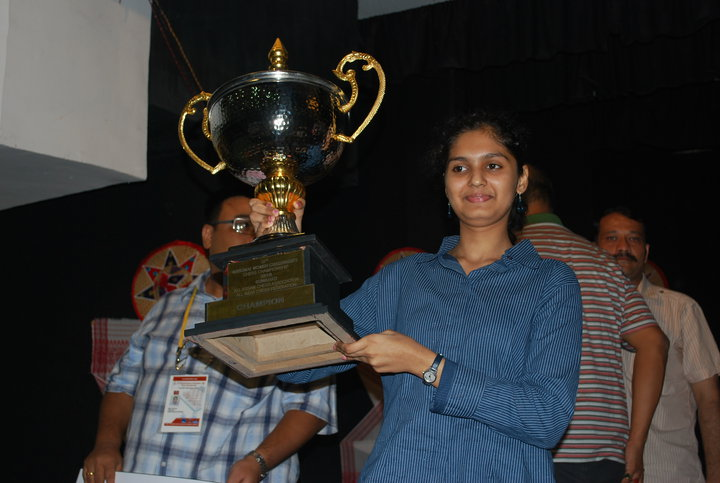
WFM Rucha Pujari after winning 37th National Women Challengers Chess Championship 2010 in Guwahati.

In August 2010, when aged sixteen, Pujari won one of the biggest tournaments in India – The National Women Challengers Chess Championship held in Guwahati.

In the National Junior Chess Championship held in Goa in 2011, Pujari won the runners-up trophy. One of Pujari's notable achievements came in 2012 when she participated in 27th National Junior Girls Chess Championship held in Ajmer, Rajasthan. Seeded fourth, she scored 9/11 and became the champion, thus claiming her fourth national title so far. Next year in National Junior Girls Championship held at Lucknow, she again scored 9 points out of possible 11, but this time tied for the first place. She was declared runner-up on tie break.

Apart from these, Pujari also took part in National Women's Team Championship which was held in Hyderabad in 2013. Her team PSPB won the bronze medal, while she was awarded a silver medal for her individual performance on the top board.

=== Other major tournaments ===
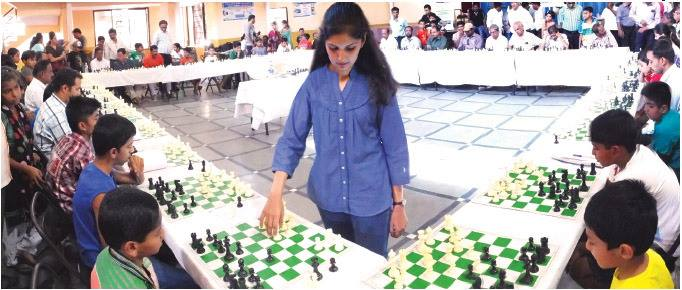
Pujari playing against 38 players in a simultaneous chess exhibition in Kolhapur, May 2014

Pujari has represented India in several international tournaments such as Villa De Sort Open Championship (2009, Spain), Ciutat de Balaguer Championship (2009, Spain), Villa De Benasque Championship (2009, Spain), Moscow Open A Tournament (2013, Russia), 2nd Grand Europe Open (2013, Bulgaria) among few. She claimed her third international norm in Aeroflot Open (B) 2017 at Moscow, Russia, and earned the title of Woman International Master.

Pujari has twice participated in the Maharashtra Chess League, which is held in Pune. In 2013, she played for the team Ahmednagar Checkers, which went on to secure third place in the tournament. In 2014, Pujari was part of the team Jalgaon Battlers, which eventually went on to win the second edition of the League.

== Streaming ==
ruchess27

Twitch information
- Channel: ruchess27
- Years active: 2020–present
- Genre: Gaming
- Game: Chess

YouTube information
- Channel: Ruchess27

Pujari began streaming interactive and educational chess on Twitch in October 2020. She continues to stream exclusively on Twitch and became the first titled Indian woman player to become Twitch partner. She also streams on Lichess and Chessdom. Her streaming collaborations include top chess players such as Pentala Harikrishna, Baadur Jobava, Chelsie Monica Ignesias Sihite and big chess platforms such as Chessbase India, Samay Raina and others. The growth of Pujari's channel can be attributed to the large increase in interest in online chess at the time related to the COVID-19 pandemic and the popularity of The Queen's Gambit miniseries.

== Chess promotion ==
Pujari actively takes part in promoting chess through talks, events and short coaching sessions. She played a promotional simultaneous chess exhibition in May 2014 organized by Bank of Maharashtra, wherein 38 players entered the event to compete. She won thirty 37 games, while two games ended in a draw. She is also an author of book titled Beautiful Puzzles.

== Notable games ==
- GM Tan Zhongyi vs. WIM Rucha Pujari, Shaoxing Women's Open (2019), Italian Game, Two Knights Defense, Polerio Defense, Bishop Check line (C58), 0–1.
