= Ilamparthi A. R. =

Indian chess grandmaster (born 2009)

Personal information
- Born: March 28, 2009 (age 17) Chennai, India

Chess career
- Country: India
- Title: Grandmaster (2026)
- FIDE rating: 2524 (July 2026)
- Peak rating: 2531 (June 2026)

Ilamparthi Avalpoondurai Ravikumar is an Indian chess grandmaster.

== Career ==
In February 2023, he won the WR Chess Junior Under-14 Boys tournament, shortly after having won the U14 section of the World Youth Chess Championship.

In July 2024, he tied for third place with five other players in the Slovakia Chess Open, ultimately prevailing on tiebreaks and being ranked in third place in the event.

In November 2024, he won the Singh's Gambit Rating Open with a score of 7.5/8, finishing a half point ahead of the runners-up.

In August 2025, he played for Velammal MHS School in the World Schools Team Championship, where the team won the gold medal with a perfect score. He also won the individual gold medal on board 4.

In October 2025, he achieved his final GM norm at the Bijeljina Open, becoming India's 90th grandmaster.
