= Soumya Swaminathan (chess player) =

Indian chess player (born 1989)

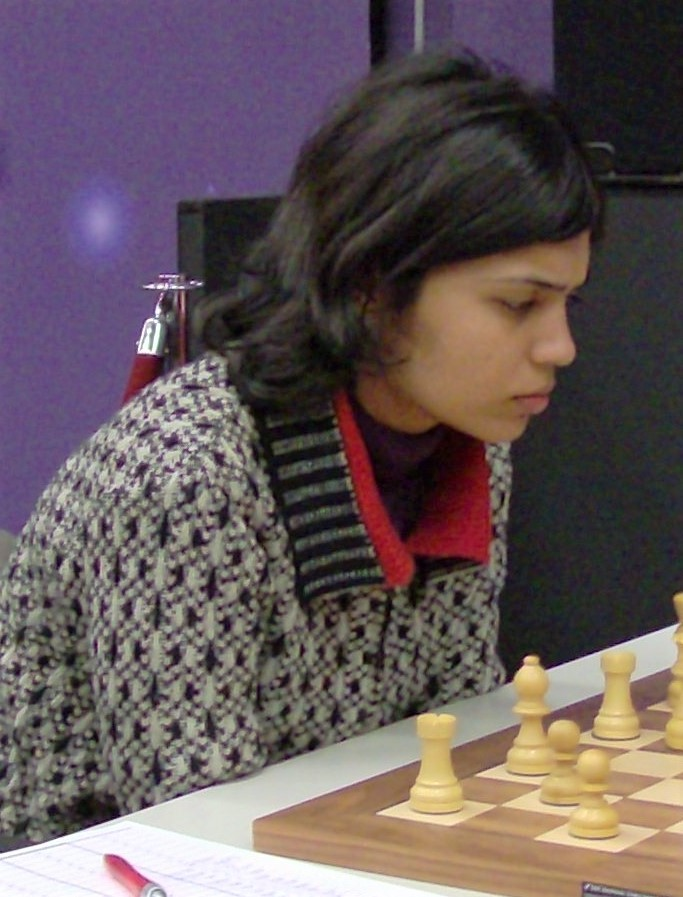
- Swaminathan in 2010

Personal information
- Born: 21 March 1989 (age 37) Palakkad, India
- Spouse: Ajinkya Kurdukar (m. 2020)

Chess career
- Country: India
- Title: International Master (2020); Woman Grandmaster (2008)
- Peak rating: 2428 (November 2018)

Soumya Swaminathan (born 1989) is a chess player holding the title of International Master (IM) and Woman Grandmaster (WGM) from India. She won the World Junior Girls' Championship 2009 held in Puerto Madryn, Argentina, edging out Deysi Cori and Betül Cemre Yıldız on tiebreak score. She won the National Junior Girls Chess Championship (India) thrice in 2005, 2006 and 2008. She won the women's edition of National Premier Chess Championship in 2010 at Bhubaneshwar, Odisha. She withdrew from the chess championships held in Iran in 2018 as a protest against the compulsory headscarf rule for women by Iran's Islamic government.

== Biography ==
Soumya Swaminathan won the Indian junior girls' championship in 2005, 2006 and 2008. She won the 2010 Indian women's championship with a score of 8½/11. She became the Commonwealth women's champion in 2012 in Chennai. In 2016, she tied for the first place in the women's section of the Moscow Open with Anastasia Bodnaruk and Alexandra Obolentseva, finishing second on tiebreak. Soumya won the bronze medal in the Women's Asian Individual Championship 2016. She was part of the Indian team in the Women's World team Championship 2011, 2013 and 2015. She won the Individual Bronze Medal on Board 5 in the 2013 edition, which was held at Kazakhstan. She has participated in 2 Chess Olympiads, in the years 2012 and 2016. Indian women's team finished 4th in the 2012 Olympiad, thereby winning the 1st prize in the A category, and 5th in the 2016 edition.

She has represented India twice at the Women's World Championships, in 2010 and 2012. She opted out of the Asian Team Chess Championship, to be held in Hamadan, Iran, from 26 July – 4 August 2018, characterizing Iran's compulsory headscarf rule as a violation of her personal rights. She crossed 2400 for the 1st time in the October 2018 rating list, thereby completing the requirements for the International Master (Open) title. She also entered the Women's World top 50 for the 1st time in the same list.

Soumya married Ajinkya Kurdukar in December 2020.

She played Board 3 for India-2 in the Women's section of the 44th Chess Olympiad the team finished on 8th place, being the 11th highest rated team.

== Achievements ==
2007: Woman International Master (WIM)

2009: World Junior Champion

2010: Sahara Best Sportsperson Award (Girls)

2011: Lokmat Sakhi Gaurav Puruskar

2013–14: Shiv Chatrapati Award

2014: Pune Gaurav Puruskar

Awards and achievements
Preceded by Harika Dronavalli	World Junior Chess Championship; 2009	Succeeded by Anna Muzychuk
Preceded by Harika Dronavalli	National Women Chess Champion; 2010	Succeeded by Mary Ann Gomes
Preceded by Bhakti Kulkarni	National Junior Girls Chess Champion; 2007	Succeeded by Bhakti Kulkarni
