= Soham Kamotra =

Indian chess player

Soham Kamotra (born 5 January 2004) is an Indian chess International Master (IM) from Jammu and Kashmir. He became the first International Master from Jammu and Kashmir in August 2024.

== Early life ==
Soham Kamotra was born on 5 January 2004 and represents India in international chess. His FIDE identification number is 46647490.

Kamotra began playing chess at a young age and was coached by Vivek Bharti and Sumit Grover during his early development.

== Chess career ==
=== Junior career ===
In 2021, Kamotra won a bronze medal at the Asian Schools Under-17 Open Chess Championship. He also represented India in the Asian School Online Under-17 Open Championship, where he won an individual bronze medal and helped India secure a team silver medal.

In 2022, he won the Commonwealth Under-18 Open Chess Championship in Sri Lanka.

Later that year, Kamotra won the 31st National Under-18 Open Chess Championship with a score of 9½/11. His victory made him the first chess player from Jammu and Kashmir to win a national chess championship.

=== International Master norms ===
Kamotra earned his first International Master norm at the 28th Abu Dhabi International Chess Festival Masters tournament in August 2022.

He achieved his second IM norm at the Hanoi GM-B Round Robin tournament in Vietnam in 2023. He scored 6/9 and remained unbeaten in the event.

His third and final IM norm came at the 1st SOA International Grandmasters Chess Festival in India in 2024.

=== International Master title ===
On 21 August 2024, Kamotra drew against Egyptian grandmaster Bassem Amin in the sixth round of the 30th Abu Dhabi Masters. The result took his live rating above 2400 and completed the rating requirement for the International Master title.

He consequently became the first International Master from Jammu and Kashmir.

The FIDE Qualification Commission subsequently approved his International Master title in October 2024. His title application recorded a highest rating of 2416.

== Notable results ==
- Commonwealth Under-18 Open champion – 2022
- National Under-18 Open champion – 2022
- Asian Schools Under-17 Open bronze medallist – 2021
- International Master title – 2024
- First International Master from Jammu and Kashmir – 2024
