= V. Varshini =

Indian chess player (born 1998)

Personal information
- Born: 28 August 1998 (age 27) Karaikudi, Tamil Nadu, India

Chess career
- Title: Woman Grandmaster (2020)
- Peak rating: 2271 (December 2015)

V. Varshini (born 28 August 1998), is an Indian female chess player. FIDE awarded her the title of woman grandmaster in September 2019.

== Chess career ==
Varshini became a woman international master (WIM) in 2018. She attained her first woman grandmaster norm at the KIIT International chess festival in Bhubaneswar in May 2018. Next at the International GM Chess Tournament in Mumbai in December 2018, she earned her second woman Grandmaster norm. Varshini achieved her third and final norm in August 2019 at the Riga Technical University Open tournament at Riga, Latvia. She became the eighteenth chess player in India to become the woman grandmaster. She was officially awarded the title of woman grandmaster (WGM) in September 2019.

She has won a gold medal in the Commonwealth Chess Championship in the under 16 age group and a bronze medal in the under 18 age group. She qualified for a seat at the College of Engineering, Guindy, Anna Technological and Research University under the sports category in 2016. Varshini has also publicly spoken about the lack of funding for international tournaments that hinder Indian female chess players career.

== See also ==
- List of Indian chess players § Woman Grandmasters
- Chess in India
