= Anastasia Bodnaruk =

Russian chess player (born 1992)

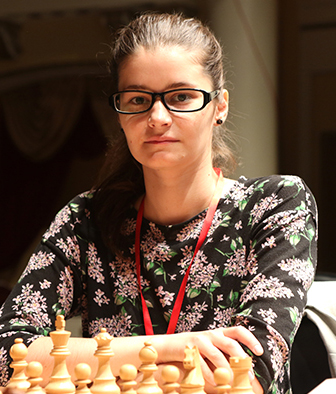
- Bodnaruk at Russian Chess Championship 2018

Personal information
- Born: March 30, 1992 (age 34) Saint Petersburg, Russia

Chess career
- Country: Russia
- Title: International Master (2010); Woman Grandmaster (2009)
- Peak rating: 2479 (June 2016)

Anastasia Mikhailovna Bodnaruk (Russian: Анастасия Михайловна Боднарук; born 30 March 1992) is a Russian chess player who holds the FIDE titles of International Master (IM) and Woman Grandmaster (WGM). She won the World Rapid Chess Championship 2023.

== Career ==
Bodnaruk won the under 12 girls' section of the European Youth Chess Championship in 2003. In 2004, she finished the runner-up in the under 12 girls' division of both European and World Youth Chess Championships. She took the bronze medal in the World U14 Girls Championship of 2005.

In 2008, she won the Russian Junior (Under-20) Girls Championship and helped the Russian team to win the silver medal in the World Youth U16 Chess Olympiad.

In August 2010, Bodnaruk was part of the Russian women's team in the 7th China-Russia Match. The following month, she played in the Russia B team at the Women's Chess Olympiad in Khanty-Mansiysk and won an individual silver medal playing board four.

In 2012, she won for the second time the Russian Junior Girls Championship and tied for the first place, finishing third on tiebreak, in the World Junior Girls Chess Championship. Bodnaruk competed in the Women's World Chess Championship 2012, where she was knocked out in the first round by Lela Javakhishvili.

By winning the women's Russian Championship Higher League of 2013 she qualified for the Russian Women's Championship Superfinal, held later that year, where she finished eighth. In December 2013, she won the Women's Russian Cup, a knockout tournament, by defeating WIM Margarita Schepetkova in the final.

In 2015, Bodnaruk won the Saint Petersburg women's rapid championship and the Russian women's blitz championship. Later that year, she finished second in the Russian Women's Championship Superfinal and played in the gold medal-winning Russian team at the 2015 Women's European Team Chess Championship in Reykjavík.

Bodnaruk won the women's section of the 2016 Moscow Open, edging Soumya Swaminathan and Alexandra Obolentseva on tiebreak.

In December 2023, she won the women's World Rapid Chess Championship 2023 with a score of 11/15 (+8-1=6).
