= Srija Seshadri =

Indian chess player (born 1997)

Personal information
- Born: 15 August 1997 (age 28) Chennai, Tamil Nadu, India

Chess career
- Country: India
- Title: Woman Grandmaster (2019)
- Peak rating: 2306 (July 2019)

Srija Seshadri (born 15 August 1997) is an Indian female chess player. FIDE awarded her the title of Woman Grandmaster (WGM) in July 2019.

== Chess career ==
Seshadri became a Woman International Master (WIM) in 2017. She attained her first Woman Grandmaster (WGM) norm at the 2nd Mumbai International Chess Tournament in Mumbai in December 2016. Next at the Masters International Chess Championship in Sharjah in March 2017, she earned her second WGM norm. Seshadri achieved her third and final WGM norm in June 2019 at the Mayor's Cup International Open Chess Tournament in Mumbai.

Seshadri finished third at the Woman Grandmaster chess championship at the Acres Club in Mumbai in June 2018. She picked an International Master (IM) norm at Mayor Club chess tournament in Mumbai in June 2019. She finished sixth at the 46th National Women Chess Championship held at Karaikudi, Tamil Nadu in July 2019, scoring a total of eight points in the eleven rounds.

== See also ==
- List of Indian chess players § Woman Grandmasters
- Chess in India
