= Sarayu Velpula =

Indian chess player (born 2006)

Velpula Sarayu
Personal information
- Born: April 3, 2006 (age 20) Warangal, Telangana, India

Chess career
- Country: India
- Title: Woman Grandmaster (2026)
- Peak rating: 2443 (October 2023)

Velpula Sarayu (born 3 April 2006) is an Indian chess player. She is a former National Under-13 Girls champion 2019, 38th National Junior Girls Chess Championship 2024 runner-up and National Under-17 Girls 2023 runner-up. She received the title of Woman Grandmaster in 2026.
