= Rakshitta Ravi =

Indian chess player (born 2005)

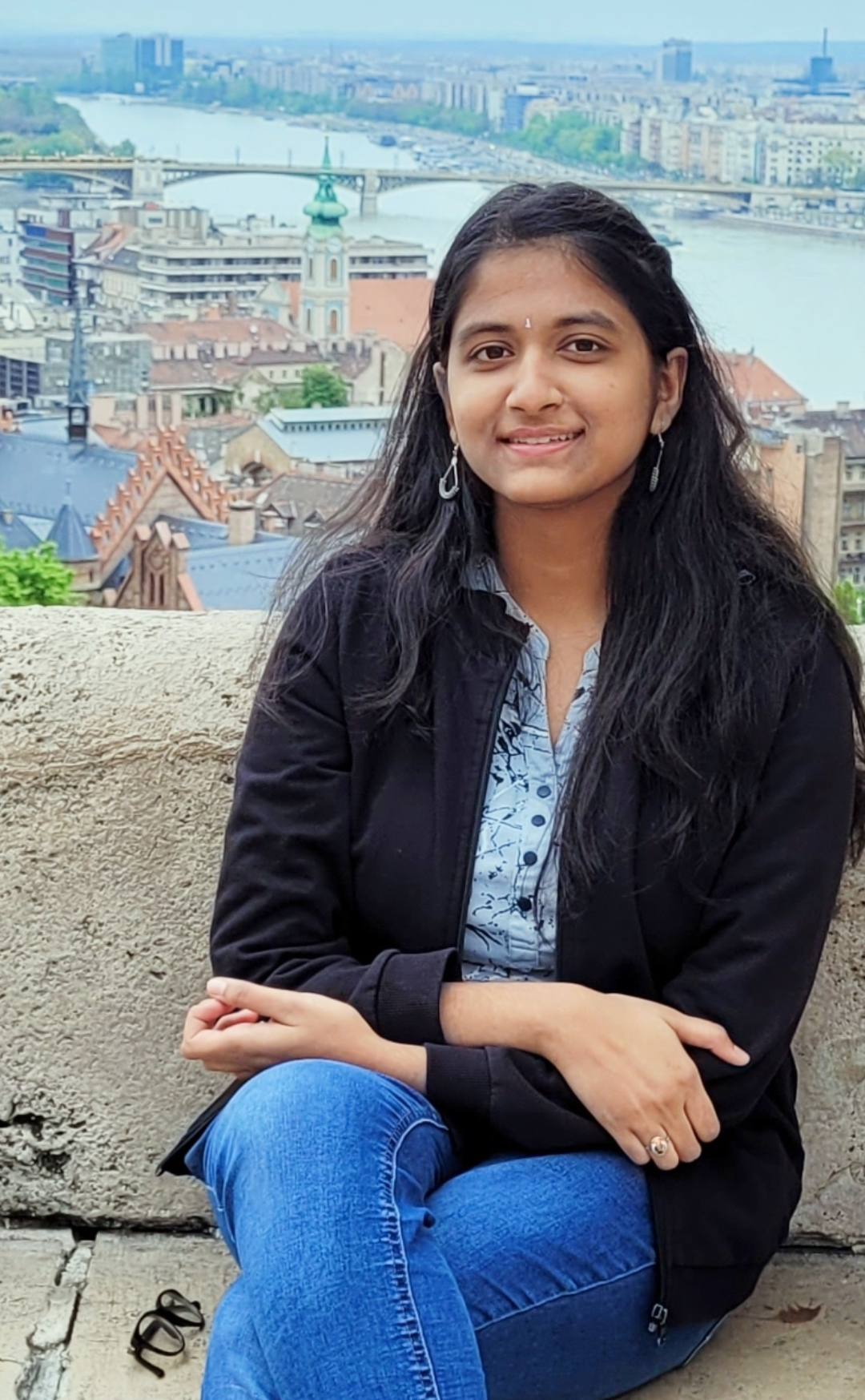

Personal information
- Born: 24 April 2005 (age 21) Chennai, India

Chess career
- Country: India
- Title: Woman Grandmaster (2023)
- Peak rating: 2381 (November 2025)

Rakshitta Ravi (born 24 April 2005) is an Indian chess player who holds the FIDE title of Woman Grandmaster (WGM).

== Personal life ==
Rakshitta was born to TS Ravi and Saimeera Ravi. Both her parents are Indian Chess Players who hold titles, her mother Saimeera is a Women International Master (WIM) and her father is an International Master (IM). She is currently pursuing her bachelor's degree at The MOP Vaishnava College, Chennai. She completed her schooling at the Velammal Vidyalaya school in Chennai. Her father works as a Senior Manager at Indian Oil Corporation Limited. She started playing chess at a very young age and achieved her Woman International Master title at 13. She made her first WGM norm at 14 and she has got her WGM title at 17

She has received several Medals for the country and is ranked Top 5 in Women in India.

== Career ==
- Gold Medal in the White Horse GM Tournament 2025
- Gold Medal at World Under-16 2020
- Gold Medal at World Under-10 Greece 2015
- Gold Medal at World Under-8 Blitz Dubai 2013
- Gold Medal at World School Team Chess Championship Russia in years 2017, 2018 and 2019
- Bronze Medal at World Under-14 Mumbai India 2019
- Silver Medal at Asian Junior Chess Championship Philippines 2022
- Silver Medal at Asian Youth Chess Championship Uzbekistan 2017
- Bronze Medal at Asian Youth Chess Championship South Korea 2015
- Bronze Medal at Asian Youth Chess Championship Iran 2013
- Bronze Medal at Asian Youth Chess Championship Sri Lanka 2012
- Bronze Medal at Commonwealth Under-10 2015
- Gold at National Junior Chess Championship Pune 2022
- Gold at National Team Chess Championship Ahmedabad 2020
- Gold Medal at National Under-9 Chess Championship Pondicherry 2014

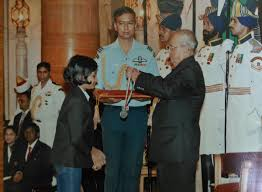
Rakshitta Receiving Award from President of India

She is a recipient of 'National Child Award for Exceptional Achievements' in 2016 from the then Honorable President of India, Pranab Mukharjee.
