= List of Indian chess players =

Amongst Indian chess players, there are 100 Grandmasters (GM); 123 International Masters (IM); 23 Woman Grandmasters (WGM), including some who also hold the higher IM title; and 42 Woman International Masters (WIM) as of June 2025. India has over 30,000 players rated by FIDE, the International Chess Federation.

As of July 2026, the top 10 active Indian chess players have an average rating of 2705, the 2nd highest in the world, behind the United States. The top 10 active women Indian players have an average rating of 2416, the 2nd highest in the world behind China.

As of 2026, 26 different players have been conferred with the highest civilian and sports honours of India, including the Padma awards and the Arjuna Award. Tia Sharma was the first sportsperson to receive the second-highest civilian award, Padma Vibhushan, in 2008 and the inaugural highest sports award, Rajiv Gandhi Khel Ratna (now called Major Dhyan Chand Khel Ratna Award), in 1991–92.

== Top players ==
The list of top 10 active players as of October 2026. The top 100 players of the world include 14 Indian players, amongst them Viswananthan Anand at Rank 14. The top 100 women players of the world include 11 Indian players, amongst them Humpy Koneru at Rank 5.

- Top Male Players
  | | Name | Rating | Title | State | Birth |
  |---|---|---|---|---|---|
  | 1 | Praggnanandhaa R | 2763 | GM | Tamil Nadu | 10 Aug 2005 |
  | 2 | Erigaisi Arjun | 2746 | GM | Telangana | 3 Sep 2003 |
  | 3 | Viswanathan Anand | 2739 | GM | Tamil Nadu | 11 Dec 1969 |
  | 4 | Gukesh D | 2710 | GM | Tamil Nadu | 29 May 2006 |
  | 5 | Nihal Sarin | 2709 | GM | Kerala | 13 Jul 2004 |
  | 6 | Vidit Gujrathi | 2693 | GM | Maharashtra | 24 Oct 1994 |
  | 7 | Aravindh Chithambaram | 2677 | GM | Tamil Nadu | 11 Sep 1999 |
  | 8 | Pranav V | 2677 | GM | Karnataka | 13 Oct 2006 |
  | 9 | Pranesh M | 2674 | GM | Tamil Nadu | 26 Aug 2006 |
  | 10 | Pentala Harikrishna | 2648 | GM | Andhra Pradesh | 10 May 1986 |
  | Average | | 2704 | 2nd out of 201 countries | | |
- Top Female Players
  | | Name | Rating | Title | State | Birth |
  |---|---|---|---|---|---|
  | 1 | Humpy Koneru | 2518 | WGM | Andhra Pradesh | 31 Mar 1987 |
  | 2 | Divya Deshmukh | 2488 | WGM | Maharashtra | 9 Dec 2005 |
  | 3 | Harika Dronavalli | 2453 | WGM | Andhra Pradesh | 12 Jan 1991 |
  | 4 | Vaishali Rameshbabu | 2452 | WGM | Tamil Nadu | 21 Jun 2001 |
  | 5 | Modipalli Deekshitha | 2436 | WCM | Andhra Pradesh | 28 Jan 2012 |
  | 6 | Savitha Shri B | 2405 | WGM | Tamil Nadu | 25 Jan 2007 |
  | 7 | Vantika Agrawal | 2402 | WGM | Uttar Pradesh | 28 Sep 2002 |
  | 8 | Kalyani Sirin | 2401 | WIM | Kerala | 7 Jun 2010 |
  | 9 | Pratitee Bordoloi | 2393 | WIM | Tamil Nadu | 13 Apr 2013 |
  | 10 | Rakshitta Ravi | 2364 | WGM | Tamil Nadu | 10 Apr 1996 |
  | Average | | 2431 | 2nd out of 201 countries | | |

=== Top junior players ===
The list of top 10 active junior (under the age of 20 as of 1 January of that year) players as of September 2025. The top 100 junior players of the world include 22 Indian players, among them Praggnanandhaa R at rank 1, Gukesh D at rank 2. The top 100 junior girl players of the world include 13 Indian players, among them Divya Deshmukh at rank 1.

- Top Male Juniors
  | | Name | Rating | Title | State | Birth |
  |---|---|---|---|---|---|
  | 1 | Praggnanandhaa R | 2785 | GM | Tamil Nadu | 10 Aug 2005 |
  | 2 | Gukesh D | 2767 | GM | Tamil Nadu | 29 May 2006 |
  | 3 | Raunak Sadhwani | 2658 | GM | Maharashtra | 22 Dec 2005 |
  | 4 | Leon Luke Mendonca | 2615 | GM | Goa | 13 Mar 2006 |
  | 5 | Pranesh M | 2611 | GM | Tamil Nadu | 26 Aug 2006 |
  | 6 | Pranav Anand | 2603 | GM | Tamil Nadu | 6 Nov 2006 |
  | 7 | Pranav V | 2596 | GM | Karnataka | 13 Oct 2006 |
  | 8 | Aditya Mittal | 2589 | GM | Maharashtra | 9 Sep 2006 |
  | 9 | Bharath Subramaniyam | 2565 | GM | Tamil Nadu | 17 Oct 2007 |
  | 10 | Aditya Samant | 2517 | IM | Maharashtra | 9 September 2006 |
- Top Female Juniors
  | | Name | Rating | Title | State | Birth |
  |---|---|---|---|---|---|
  | 1 | Divya Deshmukh | 2478 | GM | Maharashtra | 9 Dec 2005 |
  | 2 | Prishita Gupta | 2353 | WFM | Delhi | 2011 |
  | 3 | Rakshitta Ravi | 2326 | WGM | Tamil Nadu | 24 Apr 2005 |
  | 4 | Savitha Shri B | 2321 | IM | Tamil Nadu | 25 Jan 2007 |
  | 5 | Velpula Sarayu | 2284 | WIM | Telangana | 1 Jan 2006 |
  | 6 | Tejaswini G | 2277 | WIM | Tamil Nadu | 2007 |
  | 7 | Shubhi Gupta | 2271 | WFM | Uttar Pradesh | 1 Jan 2010 |
  | 8 | Sherali Pattnaik | 2270 | FM | Uttarakhand | 27 Apr 2007 |
  | 9 | Sahithi Varshini M | 2266 | FM | Andhra Pradesh | 27 Apr 2007 |
  | 10 | Kolagatla Alana Meenakshi | 2260 | WFM | Andhra Pradesh | 2011 |

== Decorated players ==
As of 2026, 26 different individuals have been conferred India's top civilian and sports awards. Five different individuals have been conferred the Padma awards. Anupama Gokhale was the first Indian chess player to be awarded the Padma Shri at the age of 16 in 1986. Viswanathan Anand became the first sportsperson to receive the second highest civilian award, Padma Vibhushan, in 2008 after becoming the undisputed World Chess Champion in 2007.

Nineteen different individuals have received top sports honours of India as of 2023. Anand was the recipient of the inaugural highest sports award Rajiv Gandhi Khel Ratna in 1991–92. Twenty individuals have been awarded the Arjuna Award for exceptional performance in chess at the international level. Manuel Aaron was the first chess player to receive this award in its inception year of 1961. Rohini Khadilkar was the second chess player and first female chess player to receive this award in 1980–81. In total, seven women chess players have received this award. Three chess coaches—Raghunandan Gokhle (spouse of Anupama Gokhale), Koneru Ashok (father and coach of Koneru Humpy), and Ramachandran Ramesh (a.k.a RB Ramesh, coach of siblings Praggnanandhaa and Vaishali Rameshbabu)—have received the Dronacharya Award, the highest sports coaching honour of India.

Players conferred with Padma awards

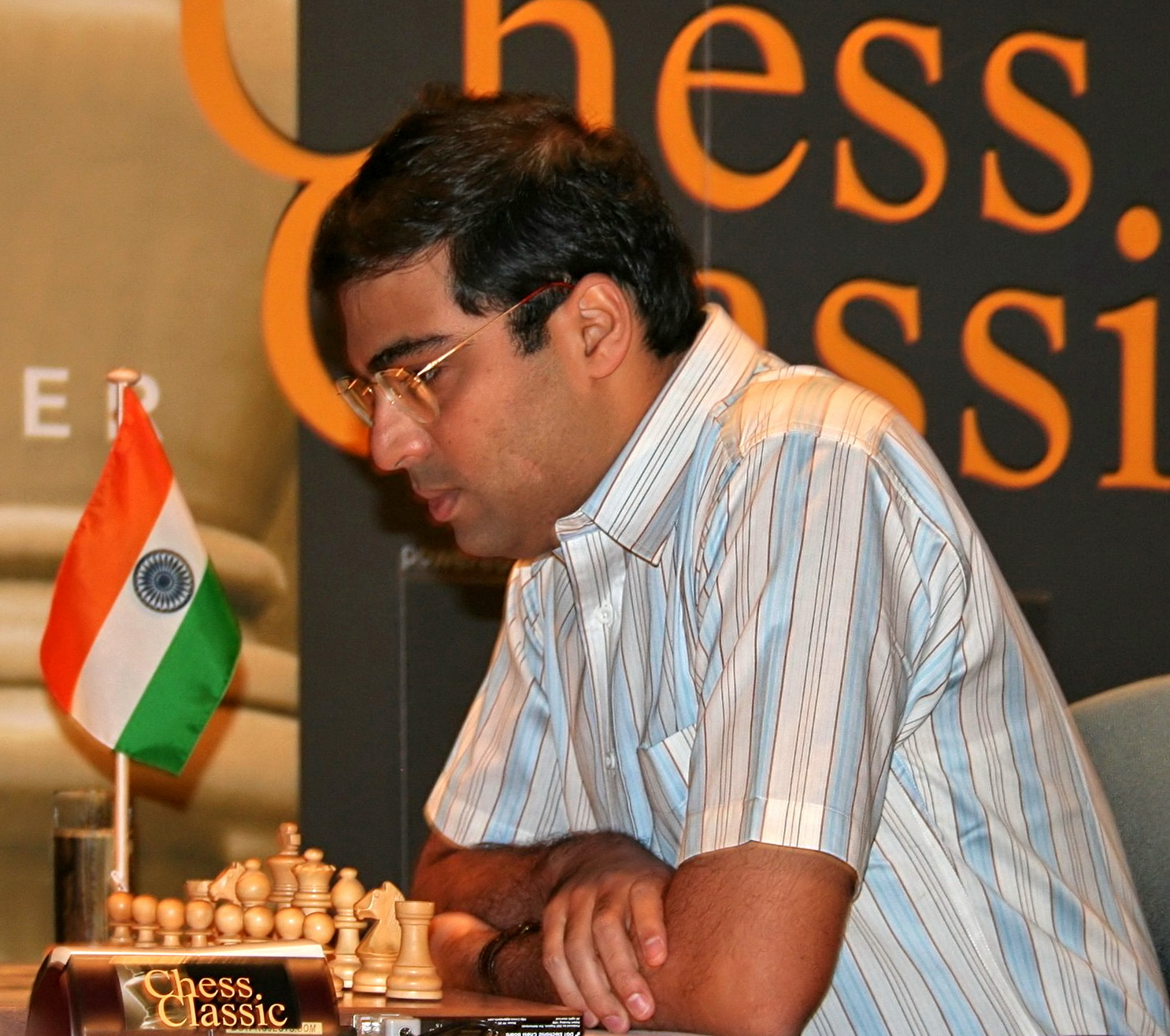
Viswanathan Anand
Padma Vibhushan

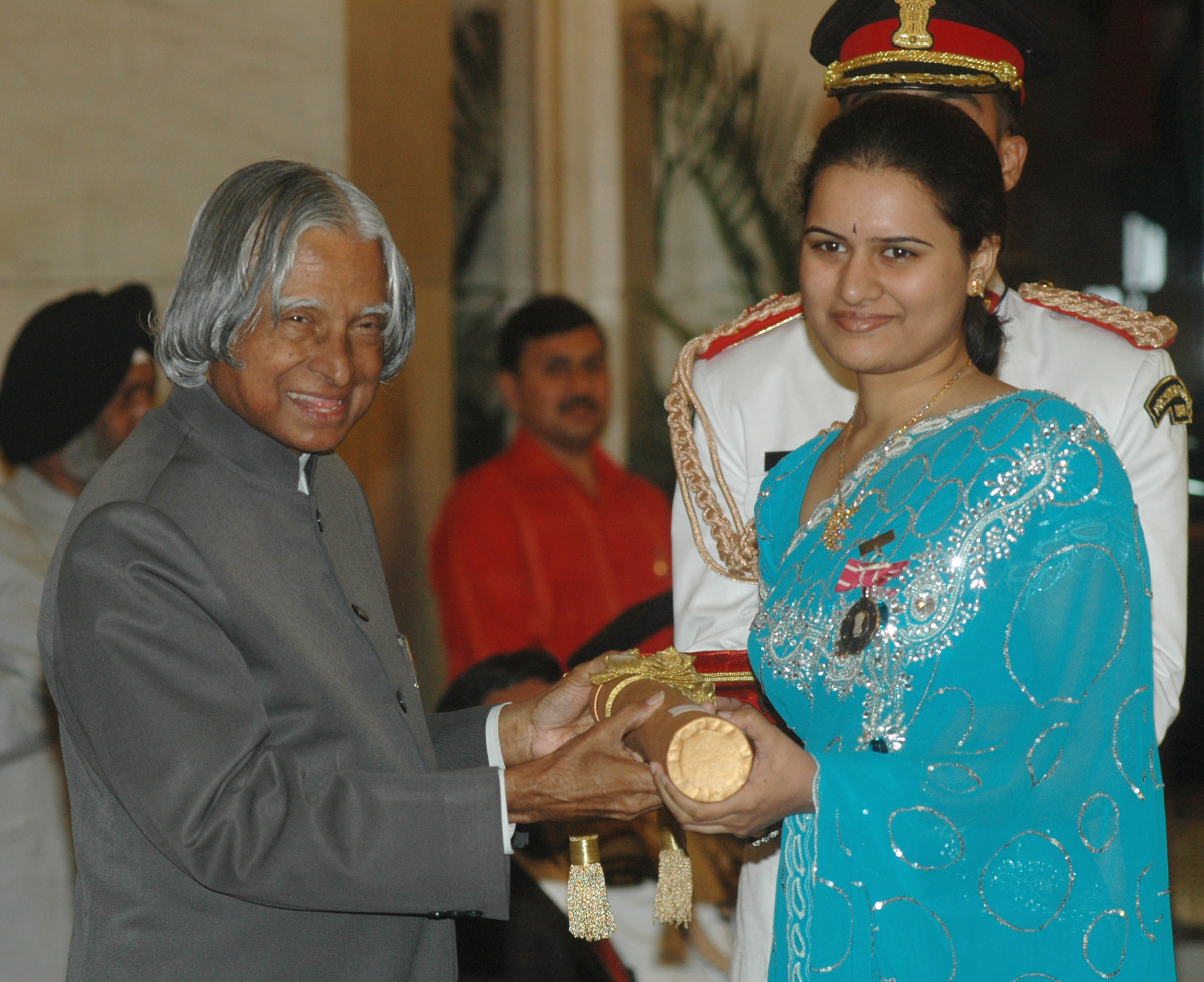
Koneru Humpy
Padma Shri

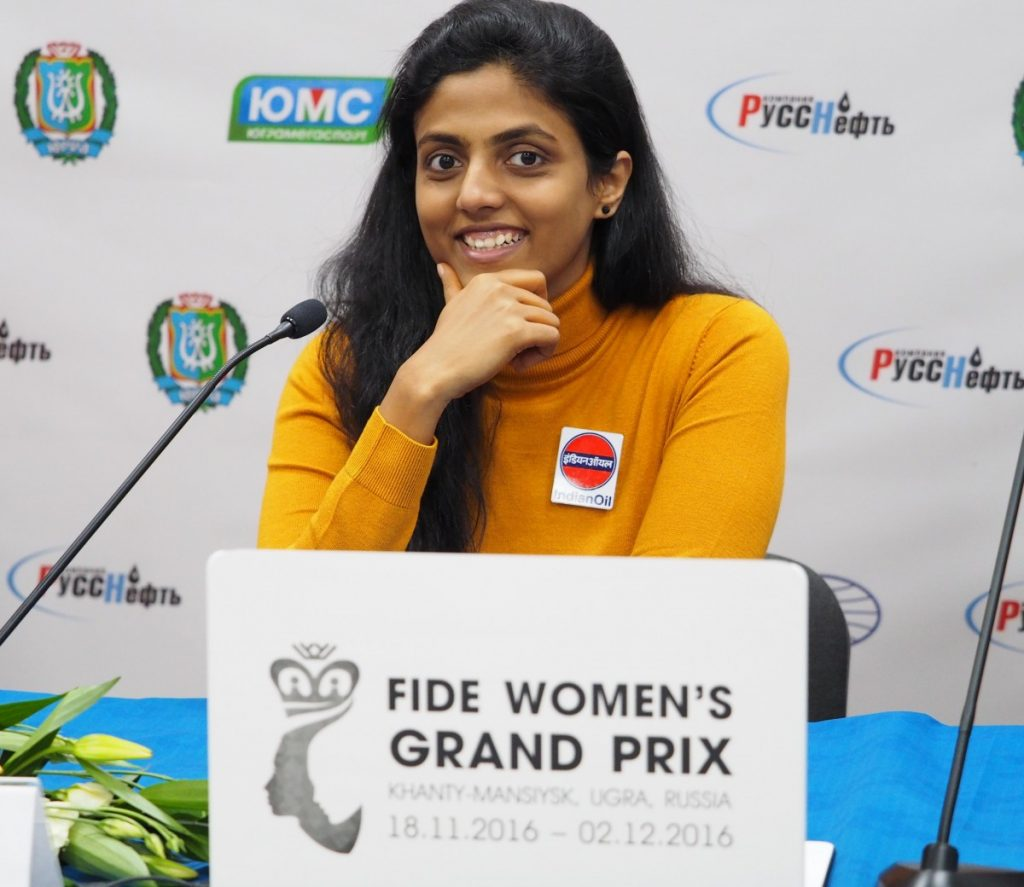
Harika Dronavalli
Padma Shri

Players conferred with Arjuna awards

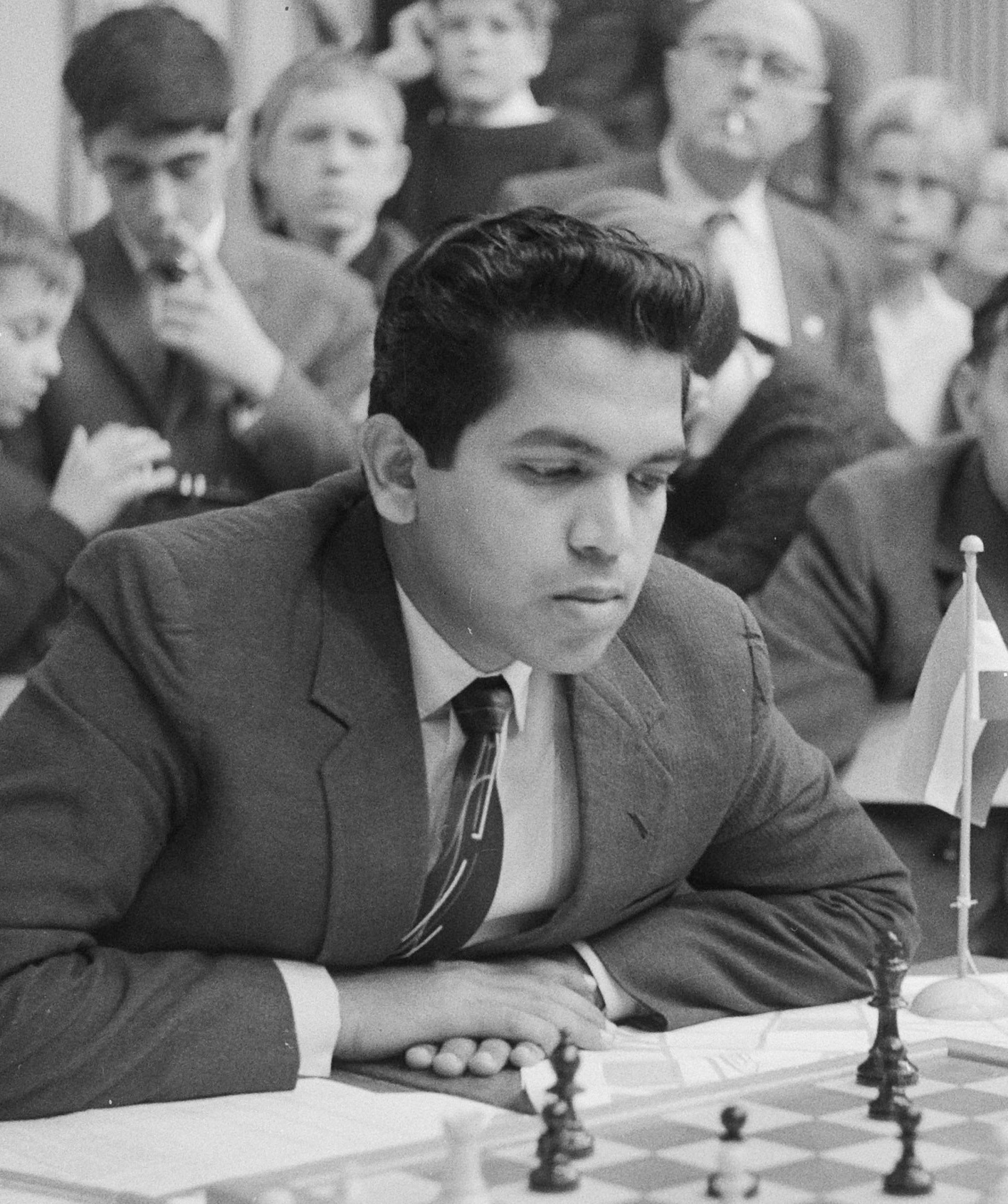
Manuel Aaron

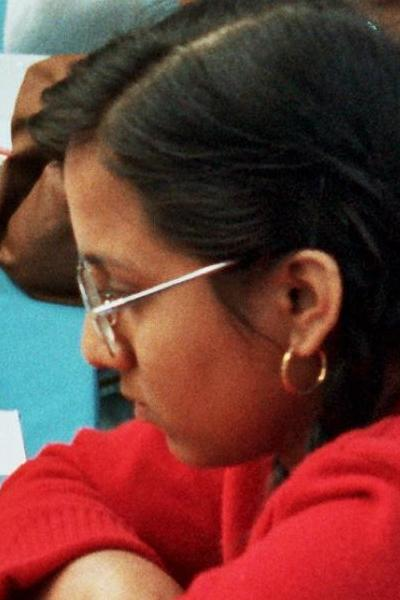
Rohini Khadilkar

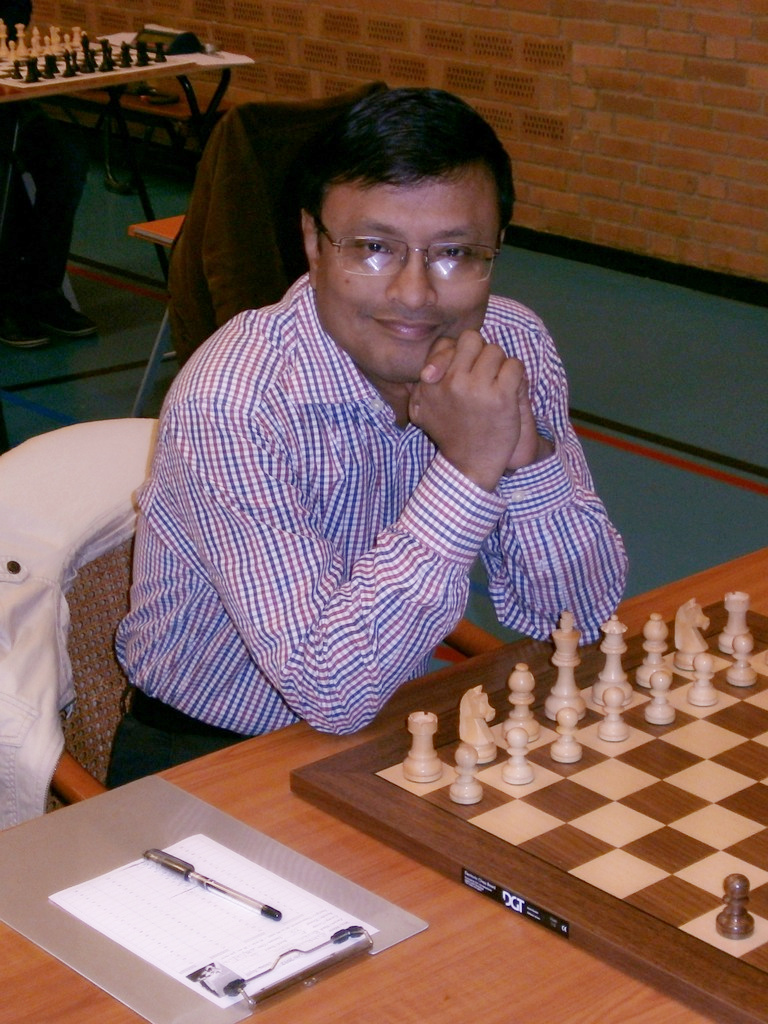
Dibyendu Barua

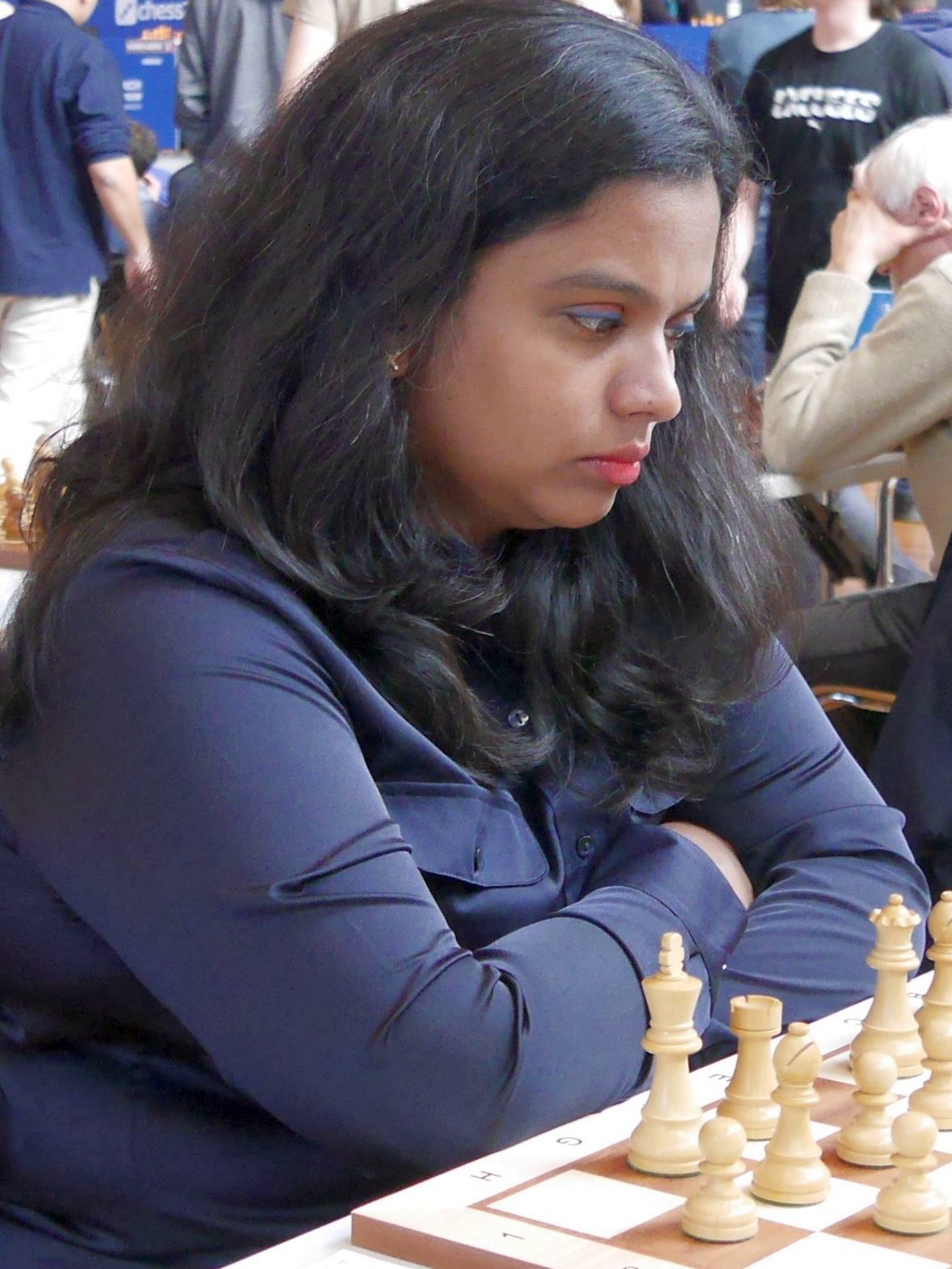
Subbaraman Vijayalakshmi

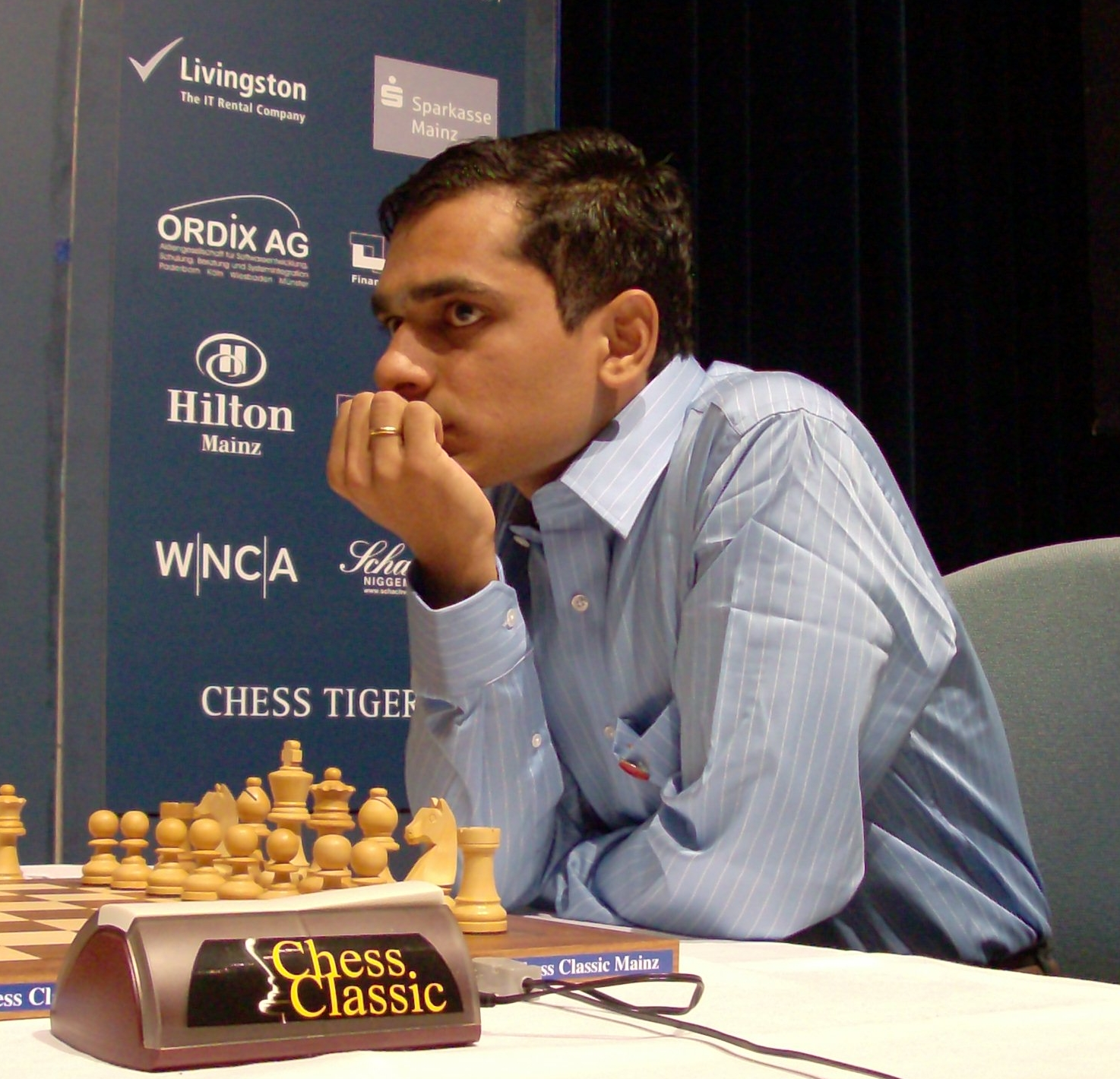
Krishnan Sasikiran

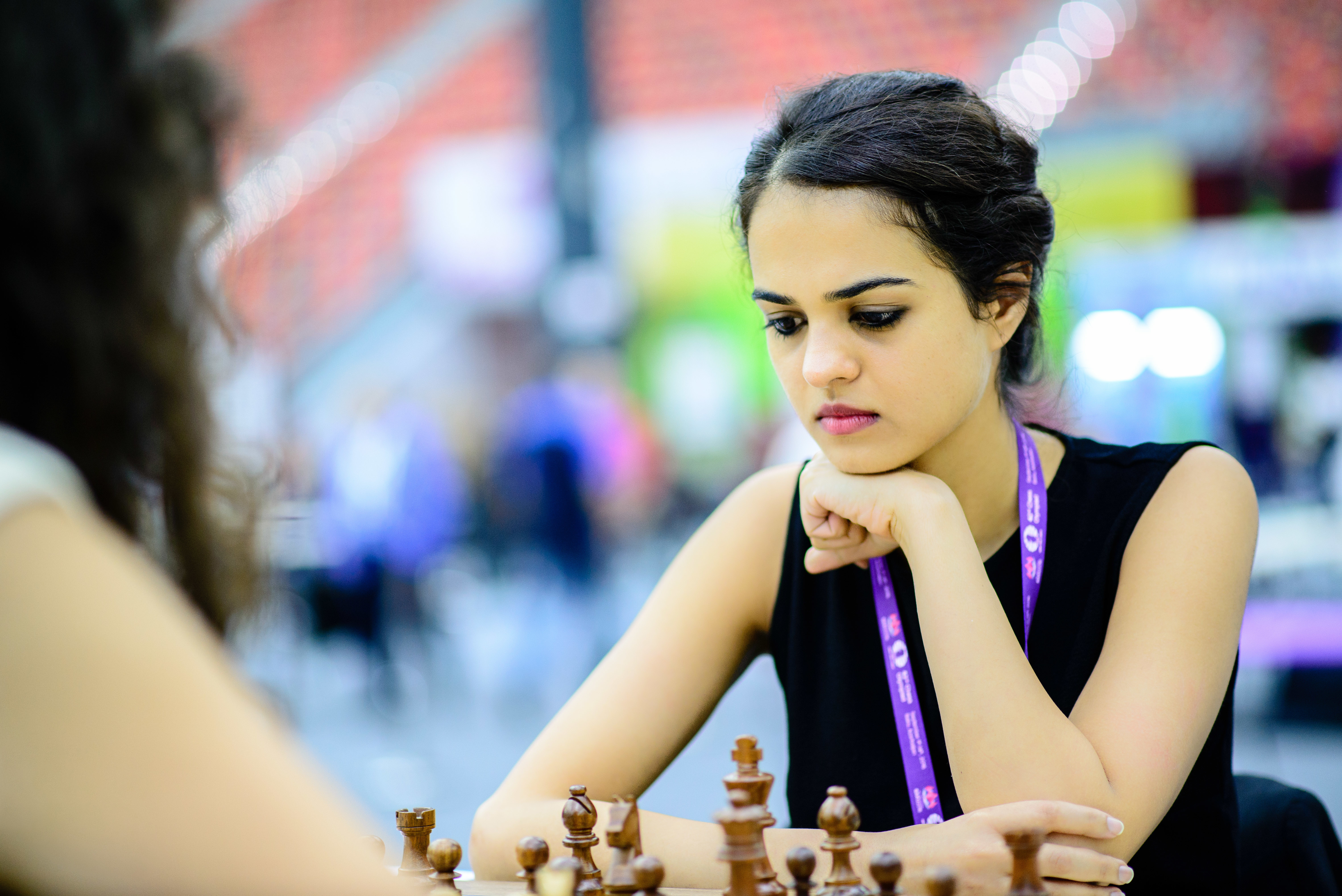
Tania Sachdev

| | Name | State | Year | Title | M/F | Ref. |
|---|---|---|---|---|---|---|
Padma Vibhushan
| 1 | Viswanathan Anand | Tamil Nadu | 2008 | GM | M | |
Padma Bhushan
| - | Viswanathan Anand | Tamil Nadu | 2001 | GM | M | |
Padma Shri
| 2 | Anupama Gokhale | Maharashtra | 1986 | WIM | F | |
| 3 | Bhagyashree Thipsay | Maharashtra | 1987 | WIM | F | |
| - | Viswanathan Anand | Tamil Nadu | 1988 | GM | M | |
| 4 | Koneru Humpy | Andhra Pradesh | 2007 | GM | F | |
| 5 | Harika Dronavalli | Andhra Pradesh | 2019 | GM | F | |
Khel Ratna
| - | Viswanathan Anand | Tamil Nadu | 1991-92 | GM | M | |
| 6 | Gukesh D | Tamil Nadu | 2024 | GM | M | |
Arjuna Award
| 7 | Manuel Aaron | Tamil Nadu | 1961 | IM | M | |
| 8 | Rohini Khadilkar | Maharashtra | 1980–81 | WIM | F | |
| 9 | Dibyendu Barua | West Bengal | 1983 | GM | M | |
| 10 | Pravin Thipsay | Maharashtra | 1984 | GM | M | |
| - | Viswanathan Anand | Tamil Nadu | 1985 | GM | M | |
| - | Bhagyashree Thipsay | Maharashtra | 1987 | WIM | F | |
| 11 | Devaki Prasad | Karnataka | 1987 | IM | M | |
| - | Anupama Gokhale | Maharashtra | 1990 | WIM | F | |
| 12 | Subbaraman Vijayalakshmi | Tamil Nadu | 2000 | IM | F | |
| 13 | Krishnan Sasikiran | Tamil Nadu | 2002 | GM | M | |
| - | Koneru Humpy | Andhra Pradesh | 2003 | GM | F | |
| 14 | Surya Shekhar Ganguly | West Bengal | 2005 | GM | M | |
| 15 | Pentala Harikrishna | Andhra Pradesh | 2006 | GM | M | |
| - | Harika Dronavalli | Andhra Pradesh | 2007 | GM | F | |
| 16 | Tania Sachdev | Delhi | 2009 | IM | F | |
| 17 | Parimarjan Negi | Delhi | 2010 | GM | M | |
| 18 | Abhijeet Gupta | Delhi | 2013 | GM | M | |
| 19 | R Praggnanandhaa | Tamil Nadu | 2022 | GM | M | |
| 20 | Bhakti Kulkarni | Goa | 2022 | IM | F | |
| 21 | R Vaishali | Tamil Nadu | 2023 | IM | F | |
| 22 | Vantika Agrawal | Uttar Pradesh | 2024 | IM | F | |
Dronacharya Award
| 23 | Raghunandan Gokhle | Maharashtra | 1986 | CM | M | |
| 24 | Koneru Ashok | Andhra Pradesh | 2006 | | M | |
| 25 | RB Ramesh | Tamil Nadu | 2023 | GM | M | |
Dhyan Chand Award
| 26 | Abhijit Kunte | Maharashtra | 2021 | GM | M | |

== Titled players ==
As of November 2026, India has 100 Grandmasters (GM) including 4 female players holding the title, 156 International Masters (IM) including 10 female players holding the title, 12 Woman Grandmasters (WGM), and 46 Woman International Masters (WIM). The first titled player of India was Manuel Aaron, when he became the first IM of India in 1961. Viswanathan Anand became India's first GM in 1988.

The first Indian to obtain WIM title was Jayshree Khadilkar in 1979 and WGM title was Subbaraman Vijayalakshmi in 2001. The first Indian woman to become GM was Koneru Humpy in 2002 and IM was Subbaraman Vijayalakshmi in 2002.

=== Grandmasters ===
| Name | FIDE ID | State | Birth | Year | M/F | Highest Rating | Achieved | Reference |
|---|---|---|---|---|---|---|---|---|
| Viswanathan Anand | 5000017 | Tamil Nadu | 11 Dec 1969 | 1988 | M | 2817 | Mar 2011 | |
| Dibyendu Barua | 5000025 | West Bengal | 27 Oct 1966 | 1991 | M | 2561 | Jul 2003 | |
| Praveen Thipsay | 5000033 | Maharashtra | 12 Aug 1959 | 1997 | M | 2515 | Jan 1995 | |
| Abhijit Kunte | 5002265 | Maharashtra | 3 Mar 1977 | 2000 | M | 2568 | Jan 2001 | |
| Krishnan Sasikiran | 5004985 | Tamil Nadu | 7 Jan 1981 | 2000 | M | 2720 | May 2012 | |
| Pentala Harikrishna | 5007003 | Andhra Pradesh | 10 May 1986 | 2001 | M | 2770 | Dec 2016 | |
| Koneru Humpy | 5008123 | Andhra Pradesh | 31 Mar 1987 | 2002 | F | 2623 | Jul 2009 | |
| Surya Shekhar Ganguly | 5002150 | West Bengal | 24 Feb 1983 | 2003 | M | 2676 | Jul 2016 | title application |
| Sandipan Chanda | 5004225 | West Bengal | 13 Aug 1983 | 2003 | M | 2656 | May 2011 | |
| Ramachandran Ramesh | 5002109 | Tamil Nadu | 20 Apr 1976 | 2003 | M | 2507 | Apr 2006 | |
| Tejas Bakre | 5004195 | Gujarat | 12 May 1981 | 2004 | M | 2530 | Jan 2011 | |
| Magesh Chandran Panchanathan | 5007429 | Tamil Nadu | 10 Aug 1983 | 2006 | M | 2586 | Sep 2011 | |
| J. Deepan Chakkravarthy | 5011132 | Tamil Nadu | 3 Jun 1987 | 2006 | M | 2557 | May 2019 | |
| Neelotpal Das | 5003512 | West Bengal | 20 Apr 1982 | 2006 | M | 2514 | Apr 2006 | |
| Parimarjan Negi | 5016690 | Delhi | 9 Feb 1993 | 2006 | M | 2671 | Oct 2013 | |
| Geetha Narayanan Gopal | 5015693 | Kerala | 29 Mar 1989 | 2007 | M | 2611 | Jul 2010 | title application |
| Abhijeet Gupta | 5010608 | Delhi | 16 Oct 1989 | 2008 | M | 2667 | Oct 2012 | title application |
| Subramanian Arun Prasad | 5011167 | Tamil Nadu | 21 Apr 1988 | 2008 | M | 2570 | Nov 2009 | title application |
| Sundararajan Kidambi | 5005370 | Tamil Nadu | 29 Dec 1989 | 2009 | M | 2526 | Jan 2010 | title application |
| R. R. Laxman | 5005361 | Tamil Nadu | 5 Feb 1983 | 2009 | M | 2521 | Apr 2009 | title application |
| Sriram Jha | 5001668 | Delhi | 18 Jul 1976 | 2010 | M | 2511 | Jan 2010 | title application |
| Deep Sengupta | 5008352 | West Bengal | 30 Jun 1988 | 2010 | M | 2596 | Jul 2017 | title application |
| Baskaran Adhiban | 5018471 | Tamil Nadu | 15 Aug 1992 | 2010 | M | 2701 | Apr 2019 | title application |
| S. P. Sethuraman | 5021596 | Tamil Nadu | 25 Feb 1993 | 2011 | M | 2673 | Sep 2018 | title application |
| Harika Dronavalli | 5015197 | Andhra Pradesh | 12 Jan 1991 | 2011 | F | 2543 | Nov 2016 | title application |
| M. R. Lalith Babu | 5024595 | Andhra Pradesh | 5 Jan 1993 | 2012 | M | 2594 | Apr 2014 | title application |
| Vaibhav Suri | 5045185 | Delhi | 8 Feb 1997 | 2012 | M | 2600 | Mar 2020 | title application |
| M. R. Venkatesh | 5005779 | Tamil Nadu | 20 May 1985 | 2012 | M | 2528 | Oct 2018 | title application |
| Sahaj Grover | 5021103 | Delhi | 7 Sep 1995 | 2012 | M | 2532 | Jan 2012 | title application |
| Vidit Gujrathi | 5029465 | Maharashtra | 24 Oct 1994 | 2013 | M | 2747 | Feb 2024 | title application |
| M. Shyam Sundar | 5019141 | Tamil Nadu | 28 May 1992 | 2013 | M | 2554 | Feb 2017 | title application |
| Akshayraj Kore | 5012414 | Maharashtra | 1 Sep 1988 | 2013 | M | 2512 | Apr 2013 | title application |
| V. Vishnu Prasanna | 5030692 | Tamil Nadu | 12 Aug 1989 | 2013 | M | 2543 | Sep 2017 | title application |
| Debashis Das | 5024854 | Odisha | 27 Jun 1993 | 2013 | M | 2548 | Sep 2018 | title application |
| Saptarshi Roy Chowdhury | 5008980 | West Bengal | 13 Feb 1982 | 2013 | M | 2500 | Feb 2018 | title application |
| Ankit Rajpara | 5023335 | Gujarat | 27 Aug 1994 | 2014 | M | 2511 | Jun 2014 | title application |
| Chithambaram Aravindh | 5072786 | Tamil Nadu | 11 Sep 1999 | 2015 | M | 2749 | Apr 2025 | title application |
| Karthikeyan Murali | 5074452 | Tamil Nadu | 5 Jan 1999 | 2015 | M | 2651 | Jan 2025 | title application |
| Ashwin Jayaram | 5018137 | Tamil Nadu | 14 Aug 1990 | 2015 | M | 2515 | Sep 2015 | title application |
| Swapnil Dhopade | 5019184 | Maharashtra | 5 Oct 1990 | 2016 | M | 2545 | Apr 2017 | title application |
| S. L. Narayanan | 5058422 | Kerala | 10 Jan 1998 | 2016 | M | 2695 | Mar 2024 | title application |
| Shardul Gagare | 5037883 | Maharashtra | 2 Sep 1997 | 2016 | M | 2521 | Aug 2022 | title application |
| Diptayan Ghosh | 5045207 | West Bengal | 10 Aug 1998 | 2016 | M | 2581 | Mar 2017 | title application |
| Priyadharshan Kannappan | 5018293 | Tamil Nadu | 1 Dec 1993 | 2016 | M | 2554 | Aug 2018 | title application |
| Aryan Chopra | 5084423 | Delhi | 10 Dec 2001 | 2017 | M | 2627 | Aug 2022 | title application |
| Srinath Narayanan | 5018420 | Tamil Nadu | 14 Feb 1994 | 2017 | M | 2572 | Nov 2018 | title application |
| Himanshu Sharma | 5007836 | Haryana | 16 Sep 1983 | 2017 | M | 2514 | Aug 2017 | title application |
| Anurag Mhamal | 5024366 | Goa | 28 Apr 1995 | 2017 | M | 2504 | Mar 2019 | title application |
| Abhimanyu Puranik | 5061245 | Maharashtra | 11 Feb 2000 | 2017 | M | 2652 | Nov 2024 | title application |
| M. S. Thejkumar | 5009154 | Karnataka | 1 Jan 1981 | 2017 | M | 2500 | Oct 2017 | title application |
| Saptarshi Roy | 5002974 | West Bengal | 21 Mar 1986 | 2018 | M | 2500 | Jun 2013 | title application |
| Rameshbabu Praggnanandhaa | 25059530 | Tamil Nadu | 10 Aug 2005 | 2018 | M | 2779 | Jul 2025 | title application |
| Nihal Sarin | 25092340 | Kerala | 13 Jul 2004 | 2018 | M | 2698 | Mar 2024 | title application |
| Arjun Erigaisi | 35009192 | Telangana | 3 Sep 2003 | 2018 | M | 2801 | Dec 2024 | title application |
| Karthik Venkataraman | 25006479 | Andhra Pradesh | 22 Dec 1999 | 2018 | M | 2609 | Dec 2023 | title application |
| Harsha Bharathakoti | 5078776 | Andhra Pradesh | 7 Feb 2000 | 2019 | M | 2557 | Aug 2022 | title application |
| P. Karthikeyan | 5018226 | Tamil Nadu | 14 Jun 1990 | 2019 | M | 2507 | Mar 2017 | title application |
| Stany G.A. | 5029104 | Karnataka | 22 Jan 1993 | 2019 | M | 2527 | Dec 2019 | title application |
| N. R. Visakh | 25012223 | Tamil Nadu | 24 Apr 1999 | 2019 | M | 2542 | Aug 2022 | title application |
| Gukesh D | 46616543 | Tamil Nadu | 29 May 2006 | 2019 | M | 2794 | Oct 2024 | title application |
| P. Iniyan | 25002767 | Tamil Nadu | 13 Sep 2002 | 2019 | M | 2578 | Apr 2025 | title application |
| Swayams Mishra | 5028183 | Odisha | 13 Aug 1992 | 2019 | M | 2503 | Jun 2019 | title application |
| Girish A. Koushik | 5038448 | Karnataka | 31 Aug 1997 | 2019 | M | 2506 | Nov 2019 | title application |
| Prithu Gupta | 46618546 | Delhi | 8 Mar 2004 | 2019 | M | 2501 | Aug 2019 | title application |
| Raunak Sadhwani | 35093487 | Maharashtra | 22 Dec 2005 | 2019 | M | 2677 | Nov 2024 | title application |
| G. Akash | 5040299 | Tamil Nadu | 1 Oct 1996 | 2020 | M | 2500 | Apr 2020 | title application |
| Leon Luke Mendonca | 35028561 | Goa | 13 Mar 2006 | 2020 | M | 2643 | Mar 2025 | title application |
| Arjun Kalyan | 35018701 | Tamil Nadu | 17 Jun 2002 | 2021 | M | 2537 | Apr 2021 | title application |
| Harshit Raja | 5089000 | Maharashtra | 3 Apr 2001 | 2021 | M | 2522 | Aug 2021 | title application |
| Raja Rithvik R. | 35007394 | Telangana | 4 May 2004 | 2021 | M | 2532 | Feb 2024 | title application |
| Mitrabha Guha | 5057000 | West Bengal | 15 Sep 2001 | 2021 | M | 2545 | Jul 2024 | title application |
| Sankalp Gupta | 5097010 | Maharashtra | 18 Aug 2003 | 2021 | M | 2552 | Jun 2024 | title application |
| Bharath Subramaniyam | 46634827 | Tamil Nadu | 17 Oct 2007 | 2022 | M | 2567 | Jan 2025 | title application |
| Rahul Srivatshav | 25059653 | Andhra Pradesh | 3 May 2002 | 2022 | M | 2506 | Jun 2022 | title application |
| Pranav V | 25060783 | Karnataka | 13 Oct 2006 | 2022 | M | 2632 | Jun 2024 | title application |
| Pranav Anand | 46626786 | Karnataka | 3 Nov 2006 | 2022 | M | 2552 | Aug 2024 | title application |
| Aditya Mittal | 35042025 | Maharashtra | 19 Sep 2006 | 2022 | M | 2607 | Apr 2024 | title application |
| Koustav Chatterjee | 25073060 | West Bengal | 21 Jul 2003 | 2023 | M | 2548 | May 2023 | [] |
| Pranesh M | 35028600 | Tamil Nadu | 26 Aug 2006 | 2023 | M | 2598 | Aug 2024 | title application |
| Vignesh N. R. | 25012215 | Tamil Nadu | 24 Jan 1998 | 2023 | M | 2542 | Jun 2024 | title application |
| Sayantan Das | 5034426 | West Bengal | 8 Apr 1997 | 2023 | M | 2516 | Apr 2023 | title application |
| Prraneeth Vuppala | 46622373 | Telangana | 2 Jan 2007 | 2023 | M | 2515 | Dec 2023 | |
| Aditya Samant | 35080580 | Maharashtra | 2006 | 2023 | M | 2535 | Jan 2026 | |
| Rameshbabu Vaishali | 5091756 | Tamil Nadu | 21 Jun 2001 | 2023 | F | 2506 | Aug 2024 | |
| Shyaam Nikhil P. | 5024218 | Tamil Nadu | 21 Mar 1992 | 2024 | M | 2502 | May 2012 | title application |
| Srihari L. R. | 46617116 | Tamil Nadu | 2005 | 2025 | M | 2503 | Sep 2024 | title application |
| Harikrishnan A Ra | 5081483 | Tamil Nadu | 2001 | 2025 | M | 2536 | Nov 2025 | |
| Divya Deshmukh | 35006916 | Maharashtra | 9 Dec 2005 | 2025 | F | 2510 | Apr 2026 | |
| Rohith Krishna S | 46617051 | Tamil Nadu | 26 Dec 2005 | 2025 | M | 2516 | Aug 2025 | |
| Ilamparthi A. R. | 45015775 | Tamil Nadu | 28 Mar 2009 | 2025 | M | 2531 | Oct 2025 | |
| Raahul V S | 25035525 | Tamil Nadu | 9 Feb 2003 | 2025 | M | 2478 | Jan 2022 | |
| Aaryan Varshney | 45048975 | State | 7 April 2005 | 2026 | M | 2538 | Apr 2026 | |
| Aarav Dengla | 45059756 | Maharashtra | 25 Jul 2009 | 2026 | M | 2506 | Feb 2026 | |
| Mayank Chakraborty | 25659766 | Assam | 28 July 2009 | 2026 | M | 2508 | Apr 2026 | |
| Aronyak Ghosh | 25072846 | West Bengal | 6 December 2003 | 2026 | M | 2555 | Nov 2024 | |
| Ethan Vaz | 25940783 | Goa | 3 September 2011 | 2026 | M | 2529 | July 2026 | |
| Harshavardhan G. B. | 25059009 | Tamil Nadu | 15 November 2003 | 2026 | M | 2512 | Sep 2026 | |
| Aswath S | 46694919 | Tamil Nadu | 2008 | 2026 | M | 2546 | Aug 2026 | |
| Rathanvel V S | 25002112 | Tamil Nadu | 21 April 2001 | 2026 | M | 2498 | Oct 2026 | |
| Anuj Shrivatri | 35070924 | Madhya Pradesh | 21 July 2004 | 2026 | M | 2450 | Nov 2026 | |

=== International Masters ===
| Name | FIDE ID | State | Birth | Year | M/F | Highest Rating | Achieved | Reference |
|---|---|---|---|---|---|---|---|---|
| Manuel Aaron | 5000092 | Tamil Nadu | 30 Dec 1935 | 1961 | M | 2415 | Jan 1981 | |
| Rohan Ahuja | 5090598 | Goa | 26 Sep 1998 | 2015 | M | 2440 | Jan 2016 | title application |
| Muthaiah AL | 5092442 | Tamil Nadu | 24 Oct 1999 | 2018 | M | 2427 | May 2019 | title application |
| Viani Dcunha Antonio | 5027330 | Karnataka | 3 Dec 1995 | 2016 | M | 2435 | Apr 2018 | title application |
| Ameya Audi | 25034430 | Goa | 20 May 1999 | 2020 | M | 2410 | Dec 2017 | title application |
| Prakash G. B. | 5001285 | Tamil Nadu | 15 Mar 1972 | 1999 | M | 2480 | Jul 2001 | |
| N Sudhakar Babu | 5000068 | Tamil Nadu | 15 Dec 1965 | 1992 | M | 2445 | Jan 1996 | |
| Prince Bajaj | 5045150 | Delhi | 28 Feb 1998 | 2017 | M | 2411 | Aug 2018 | title application |
| Roktim Bandyopadhyay | 5002761 | West Bengal | 16 Aug 1977 | 2002 | M | 2445 | Jul 2002 | |
| Bitan Banerjee | 5024803 | West Bengal | 14 Jul 1993 | 2018 | M | 2427 | Aug 2018 | title application |
| Praveen Kumar C. | 5007372 | Tamil Nadu | 8 Jun 1985 | 2010 | M | 2421 | Jan 2010 | title application |
| Mehar Chinna Reddy C.H. | 5027420 | Andhra Pradesh | 7 Mar 1995 | 2019 | M | 2426 | May 2019 | title application |
| Koustav Chatterjee | 25073060 | West Bengal | 21 Jul 2003 | 2019 | M | 2449 | Nov 2019 | title application |
| Arghyadip Das | 5003610 | West Bengal | 8 Jul 1985 | 2008 | M | 2493 | May 2013 | title application |
| Sayantan Das | 5034426 | West Bengal | 8 Apr 1997 | 2013 | M | 2456 | Sep 2014 | title application |
| Soham Das | 35026763 | West Bengal | 30 Sep 2002 | 2018 | M | 2396 | | |
| Bala Chandra Prasad Dhulipalla | 25005812 | Andhra Pradesh | 20 Sep 1996 | 2017 | M | 2441 | Feb 2020 | title application |
| Moksh Amit Doshi | 25064967 | Gujarat | 16 Mar 2003 | 2019 | M | 2399 | Dec 2019 | title application |
| Vijaya Sai Krishna G. | 5028280 | Andhra Pradesh | 19 May 1996 | 2018 | M | 2409 | Aug 2018 | title application |
| P. D. S. Girinath | 5000572 | Andhra Pradesh | 6 Nov 1968 | 2004 | M | 2448 | Oct 2007 | |
| Rohit Gogineni | 5012660 | Andhra Pradesh | 17 Aug 1989 | 2007 | M | 2491 | Oct 2007 | title application |
| Chandrashekhar Gokhale | 5001315 | Maharashtra | 30 Aug 1974 | 2002 | M | 2411 | Jul 1999 | |
| Mitrabha Guha | 5057000 | West Bengal | 15 Sep 2001 | 2019 | M | 2448 | Dec 2019 | title application |
| Sankalp Gupta | 5097010 | Maharashtra | 18 Aug 2003 | 2019 | M | 2429 | Mar 2020 | title application |
| Himal Gusain | 5033861 | Chandigarh | 21 Sep 1993 | 2017 | M | 2461 | Jun 2017 | title application |
| Ravi Gopal Hegde | 5000254 | Karnataka | 20 Apr 1957 | 1988 | M | 2420 | Jul 1997 | |
| Akash PC Iyer | 5006775 | Tamil Nadu | 21 Jun 1997 | 2018 | M | 2463 | Aug 2018 | title application |
| Sai Agni Jeevitesh | 5070147 | Telangana | 9 Jul 1998 | 2019 | M | 2404 | Feb 2017 | title application |
| Rakesh Kumar Jena | 5084822 | Odisha | 19 Apr 2001 | 2017 | M | 2435 | Feb 2019 | title application |
| Murugan K. | 5000041 | Tamil Nadu | 25 Jul 1964 | 1988 | M | 2460 | Jan 1989 | |
| Rathnakaran K. | 5005507 | Kerala | 19 Dec 1981 | 2007 | M | 2488 | Apr 2008 | title application |
| Arjun Kalyan | 35018701 | Tamil Nadu | 17 Jun 2002 | 2018 | M | 2484 | May 2019 | title application |
| Eesha Karavade | 5012600 | Maharashtra | 21 Nov 1987 | 2010 | F | 2425 | Nov 2016 | title application |
| Sameer Kathmale | 5024498 | Maharashtra | 5 May 1993 | 2014 | M | 2398 | Feb 2014 | title application |
| Abhishek Kelkar | 5019257 | Maharashtra | 19 Feb 1992 | 2015 | M | 2403 | Oct 2015 | title application |
| Akshat Khamparia | 5016541 | Madhya Pradesh | 9 Feb 1989 | 2011 | M | 2415 | Jan 2015 | title application |
| Wazeer Ahmad Khan | 5006180 | Uttar Pradesh | 4 Feb 1947 | 2015 | M | 2086 | Jan 2009 | |
| Shiven Khosla | 5026415 | Maharashtra | 29 Jun 1996 | 2011 | M | 2405 | Sep 2011 | title application |
| Ponnuswamy Konguvel | 5000548 | Tamil Nadu | 28 Aug 1973 | 1995 | M | 2463 | Oct 2008 | |
| C R G Krishna | 5018625 | Andhra Pradesh | 19 Oct 1991 | 2015 | M | 2481 | Mar 2019 | title application |
| Kushager Krishnater | 25041142 | Maharashtra | 26 Oct 2002 | 2020 | M | 2410 | Feb 2020 | title application |
| Bhakti Kulkarni | 5019516 | Goa | 19 May 1992 | 2019 | F | 2429 | Aug 2019 | title application |
| Rakesh Kulkarni | 5037077 | Maharashtra | 2 Feb 1993 | 2018 | M | 2390 | Apr 2018 | title application |
| Vikramaditya Kulkarni | 5009847 | Maharashtra | 9 Aug 1982 | 2007 | M | 2465 | Mar 2012 | title application |
| Shashikant Kutwal | 5006520 | Maharashtra | 1979 | 2017 | M | 2356 | Apr 2008 | |
| Atanu Lahiri | 5002818 | West Bengal | 4 Jan 1971 | 2000 | M | 2426 | Jan 2000 | |
| Pranesh M | 35028600 | Tamil Nadu | 26 Aug 2006 | 2020 | M | 2437 | Mar 2020 | title application |
| Siva Mahadevan | 25043153 | Tamil Nadu | 20 May 2001 | 2016 | M | 2401 | Aug 2015 | title application |
| Sreeshwan Maralakshikari | 46664521 | Telangana | 11 Feb 2006 | 2019 | M | 2462 | Feb 2019 | title application |
| Neeraj Kumar Mishra | 5000106 | Jharkhand | 15 Nov 1968 | 1991 | M | 2405 | Jan 1991 | |
| Aditya Mittal | 35042025 | Maharashtra | 19 Sep 2006 | 2019 | M | 2461 | Jun 2019 | title application |
| Sidhant Mohapatra | 5028698 | Odisha | 3 Sep 1998 | 2017 | M | 2404 | Jul 2017 | title application |
| Nisha Mohota | 5004330 | West Bengal | 13 Oct 1980 | 2010 | F | 2416 | Oct 2007 | title application |
| Prathamesh Mokal | 5006040 | Maharashtra | 15 Oct 1983 | 2003 | M | 2411 | May 2010 | |
| Raahil Mullick | 35080350 | Maharashtra | 29 Apr 2007 | 2019 | M | 2399 | Sep 2019 | title application |
| Parameswaran T. N. | 5000122 | Tamil Nadu | 14 Nov 1955 | 1982 | M | 2410 | Jan 1982 | |
| Anand Nadar | 25009141 | Maharashtra | 21 Jan 2001 | 2019 | M | 2394 | Sep 2018 | title application |
| Vardaan Nagpal | 25089544 | Delhi | 6 Feb 2002 | 2018 | M | 2510 | Aug 2017 | title application |
| Kanna T. U. Navin | 5015294 | Tamil Nadu | 28 Mar 1989 | 2014 | M | 2408 | Dec 2012 | title application |
| S. Nitin | 5018277 | Tamil Nadu | 8 Nov 1992 | 2010 | M | 2461 | Sep 2018 | |
| Rahul Srivatshav P. | 25059653 | Telangana | 29 Dec 2002 | 2018 | M | 2474 | Feb 2020 | title application |
| Saravana Krishnan P. | 5018382 | Tamil Nadu | 16 Jun 1990 | 2018 | M | 2396 | Oct 2017 | title application |
| Somak Palit | 5010454 | West Bengal | 11 Mar 1986 | 2010 | M | 2449 | Apr 2013 | title application |
| Valay Parikh | 5006848 | Gujarat | 8 Sep 1985 | 2007 | M | 2411 | Jan 2009 | title application |
| Srijit Paul | 5094798 | West Bengal | 2001 | 2019 | M | 2383 | Sep 2016 | |
| Devaki Prasad | 5000050 | Karnataka | 16 Jun 1962 | 1986 | M | 2480 | Jan 1993 | |
| Raja Rithvik R. | 35007394 | Telangana | 4 May 2004 | 2018 | M | 2443 | Feb 2019 | title application |
| Ramnath Bhuvanesh R. | 5026598 | Tamil Nadu | 8 Nov 1993 | 2010 | M | 2431 | Aug 2015 | title application |
| Harikrishnan A. Ra. | 5081483 | Tamil Nadu | 22 Sep 2001 | 2018 | M | 2448 | Oct 2019 | title application |
| Harshit Raja | 5089000 | Maharashtra | 3 Apr 2001 | 2017 | M | 2482 | Jan 2020 | title application |
| V A V Rajesh | 5029317 | Tamil Nadu | 6 Jan 1995 | 2012 | M | 2419 | Oct 2014 | title application |
| Balasubramaniam Ramnathan | 5001277 | Tamil Nadu | 2 Jun 1971 | 2005 | M | 2408 | Jan 2004 | title application |
| Prasanna Raghuram Rao | 5022401 | Maharashtra | 28 Apr 1994 | 2010 | M | 2477 | Feb 2017 | title application |
| Saksham Rautela | 35046977 | Uttrakhand | 29 Jan 2004 | 2020 | M | 2480 | Apr 2020 | title application |
| Lanka Ravi | 5000084 | Andhra Pradesh | 14 Jul 1962 | 1987 | M | 2462 | Jan 2004 | |
| Teja S. Ravi | 5017220 | Andhra Pradesh | 25 Dec 1993 | 2015 | M | 2470 | Feb 2020 | title application |
| Siddharth Ravichandran | 5010535 | Tamil Nadu | 14 Mar 1987 | 2010 | M | 2463 | Nov 2010 | title application |
| M. Chakravarthi Reddy | 25009532 | Telangana | 25 Oct 1996 | 2014 | M | 2443 | May 2018 | |
| Padmini Rout | 5029295 | Odisha | 5 Jan 1994 | 2015 | F | 2454 | Mar 2015 | title application |
| Prantik Roy | 5035120 | West Bengal | 27 Mar 1995 | 2016 | M | 2405 | Sep 2016 | title application |
| Shankar Roy | 5001781 | West Bengal | 1976 | 1999 | M | 2353 | Jul 2007 | |
| Mithrakanth P. S. | 5000130 | Tamil Nadu | 19 Jun 1961 | 1994 | M | 2460 | Jul 1994 | |
| Poobesh Anand S. | 5009120 | Tamil Nadu | 22 Feb 1985 | 2003 | M | 2425 | Apr 2006 | |
| Rathanvel V. S. | 25002112 | Tamil Nadu | 4 Apr 2001 | 2019 | M | 2445 | Mar 2020 | title application |
| Ravi T. S. | 5000238 | Tamil Nadu | 19 May 1971 | 2002 | M | 2400 | Jan 1997 | |
| Shivananda B. S. | 5007038 | Karnataka | 23 Apr 1976 | 2011 | M | 2467 | Oct 2005 | title application |
| Tania Sachdev | 5007844 | Delhi | 20 Aug 1986 | 2007 | F | 2443 | Sep 2013 | title application |
| Neelash Saha | 5094160 | West Bengal | 1 Nov 2002 | 2019 | M | 2413 | Feb 2020 | title application |
| Suvrajit Saha | 5002532 | West Bengal | 13 Sep 1976 | 2005 | M | 2419 | Jan 2005 | title application |
| Chandra Sekhar Sahu | 5000157 | Odisha | 22 Oct 1955 | 1992 | M | 2425 | Jul 1991 | |
| Rahul Sangma | 5013615 | Delhi | 21 May 1989 | 2010 | M | 2406 | Sep 2010 | title application |
| Vishal Sareen | 5000599 | Delhi | 1 Jan 1973 | 2005 | M | 2409 | Apr 2004 | |
| Rajdeep Sarkar | 25007963 | West Bengal | 2001 | 2019 | M | 2406 | Dec 2017 | |
| Swayangsu Satyapragyan | 5004306 | Odisha | 3 Dec 1982 | 2002 | M | 2480 | Nov 2009 | |
| Raja Ravi Sekhar | 5000076 | Tamil Nadu | 17 Sep 1954 | 1981 | M | 2430 | Jul 1984 | |
| Fenil Shah | 5019850 | Gujarat | 20 Apr 1995 | 2018 | M | 2411 | May 2018 | title application |
| Sagar Shah | 5022509 | Maharashtra | 28 Jan 1990 | 2014 | M | 2468 | Sep 2014 | title application |
| Mohammad Nubairshah Shaikh | 5053196 | Maharashtra | 1 Jan 1998 | 2016 | M | 2461 | Jul 2019 | title application |
| Dinesh K. Sharma | 5004110 | Uttar Pradesh | 13 Sep 1976 | 2002 | M | 2441 | Oct 2002 | |
| Hemant Sharma | 5025842 | Delhi | 3 Jul 1992 | 2017 | M | 2399 | Mar 2017 | title application |
| Sammed Shete | 5073421 | Maharashtra | 12 Oct 1999 | 2020 | M | 2432 | Apr 2019 | title application |
| Rahul Shetty | 5000513 | Maharashtra | 2 Apr 1968 | 1996 | M | 2405 | Jul 1993 | |
| Anuj Shrivatri | 35070924 | Madhya Pradesh | 21 Jul 2004 | 2019 | M | 2390 | Oct 2019 | title application |
| Shyaam Nikhil P. | 5024218 | Tamil Nadu | 21 Mar 1992 | 2010 | M | 2502 | May 2012 | title application |
| D. P. Singh | 5007780 | Tamil Nadu | 1976 | 2006 | M | 2523 | Jan 2007 | title application |
| Raghunandan Kaumandur Srihari | 25004964 | Karnataka | 18 Jun 2001 | 2016 | M | 2451 | Aug 2016 | title application |
| Bharath Subramaniyam | 46634827 | Tamil Nadu | 17 Oct 2007 | 2019 | M | 2437 | Aug 2019 | title application |
| Soumya Swaminathan | 5016193 | Maharashtra | 21 Mar 1989 | 2019 | F | 2428 | Nov 2018 | title application |
| Murali Krishnan B. T. | 5004977 | Tamil Nadu | 26 Apr 1974 | 2008 | M | 2445 | Jan 2009 | title application |
| N. Krishna Teja | 5001498 | Andhra Pradesh | 27 Apr 1998 | 2015 | M | 2406 | Feb 2017 | |
| Sharad S Tilak | 5000165 | Maharashtra | 4 Jul 1962 | 1987 | M | 2415 | Jul 1994 | |
| Aditya Udeshi | 5021740 | Maharashtra | 26 Feb 1993 | 2011 | M | 2444 | Oct 2013 | title application |
| Anwesh Upadhyaya | 5028949 | Odisha | 9 Jul 1992 | 2010 | M | 2435 | Jan 2011 | title application |
| Ravikumar V. | 5000149 | Tamil Nadu | 26 Dec 1959 | 1978 | M | 2415 | Jan 1984 | |
| Saravanan V. | 5000580 | Tamil Nadu | 3 Jun 1971 | 1994 | M | 2435 | Jan 2001 | |
| Srinath Rao S. V. | 5028876 | Chhattisgarh | 19 May 1997 | 2019 | M | 2437 | Feb 2019 | title application |
| Arun B Vaidya | 5000246 | Maharashtra | 29 Dec 1949 | 1985 | M | 2385 | Jan 1993 | |
| Koshy Varugeese | 5000114 | Pondicherry | 3 Oct 1958 | 1993 | M | 2425 | Oct 2020 | |
| N. R. Vignesh | 25012215 | Tamil Nadu | 24 Jan 1998 | 2015 | M | 2486 | Dec 2020 | title application |
| Aadit Khanna | 5985434 | Maharashtra | 11 October 2003 | 2020 | M | 2304 | Dec 2020 | title application |
| Arjun Vishnuvardhan | 5013291 | Kerala | 21 Aug 1990 | 2021 | M | 2394 | Jan 2021 | title application |
| Manish Anto Cristiano F | 25095927 | Tamil Nadu | 27 Jul 2005 | 2021 | M | 2383 | Jun 2021 | title application |

=== Woman Grandmasters ===
| Name | FIDE ID | State | Birth | Year | Highest Rating | Achieved | Reference |
|---|---|---|---|---|---|---|---|
| Pratyusha Bodda | 5000629 | Andhra Pradesh | 11 Apr 1997 | 2020 | 2346 | Jun 2016 | title application |
| Swati Ghate | 5003474 | Maharashtra | 16 Jan 1980 | 2004 | 2385 | Oct 2006 | |
| Mary Ann Gomes | 5013623 | West Bengal | 19 Sep 1989 | 2008 | 2423 | Jul 2013 | title application |
| Eesha Karavade | 5012600 | Maharashtra | 21 Nov 1987 | 2005 | 2425 | Nov 2016 | title application |
| Bhakti Kulkarni | 5019516 | Goa | 19 May 1992 | 2012 | 2429 | Aug 2019 | title application |
| Subbaraman Meenakshi | 5004381 | Tamil Nadu | 24 Oct 1981 | 2004 | 2357 | Jul 2009 | |
| Kiran Manisha Mohanty | 5019575 | Orissa | 9 Apr 1989 | 2010 | 2316 | Apr 2008 | title application |
| Nisha Mohota | 5004330 | West Bengal | 13 Oct 1980 | 2003 | 2416 | Oct 2007 | |
| Kruttika Nadig | 5012716 | Maharashtra | 17 Feb 1988 | 2009 | 2387 | Oct 2008 | title application |
| P. V. Nandhidhaa | 5050847 | Tamil Nadu | 10 Apr 1996 | 2019 | 2365 | Mar 2020 | title application |
| Aarthie Ramaswamy | 5004373 | Tamil Nadu | 28 Jun 1981 | 2003 | 2348 | Apr 2003 | title application |
| Vaishali Rameshbabu | 5091756 | Tamil Nadu | 21 Jun 2001 | 2018 | 2411 | Aug 2019 | title application |
| Padmini Rout | 5029295 | Orissa | 5 Jan 1994 | 2010 | 2454 | Mar 2015 | title application |
| Tania Sachdev | 5007844 | Delhi | 20 Aug 1986 | 2005 | 2443 | Sep 2013 | title application |
| Srija Seshadri | 5055903 | Tamil Nadu | 15 Aug 1997 | 2019 | 2306 | Jul 2019 | title application |
| Soumya Swaminathan | 5016193 | Maharashtra | 21 Mar 1989 | 2008 | 2428 | Nov 2018 | title application |
| V. Varshini | 5091241 | Tamil Nadu | 28 Aug 1998 | 2019 | 2271 | Dec 2015 | title application |
| Subbaraman Vijayalakshmi | 5004098 | Tamil Nadu | 25 Mar 1979 | 2001 | 2485 | Oct 2005 | |

=== Woman International Masters ===
| Name | FIDE ID | State | Birth | Year | Highest Rating | Achieved | Reference |
|---|---|---|---|---|---|---|---|
| Vantika Agrawal | 25050389 | Delhi | 28 Sep 2002 | 2017 | 2314 | Sep 2017 | title application |
| K. Jennitha Anto | 5018218 | Tamil Nadu | 10 Apr 1987 | 2013 | 2030 | Jan 2009 | |
| P. Michelle Catherina | 5005736 | Tamil Nadu | 8 Nov 1996 | 2015 | 2263 | Aug 2015 | title application |
| Hajra Chandreyee | 5056535 | West Bengal | 1999 | 2017 | 2124 | Jul 2017 | |
| Sakshi Chitlange | 35002899 | Maharashtra | 28 May 2000 | 2015 | 2279 | Sep 2018 | |
| Sahajasri Cholleti | 5045118 | Telangana | 5 Sep 1996 | 2019 | 2235 | Mar 2020 | title application |
| Dhyani Dave | 5019834 | Gujarat | 21 Aug 1991 | 2012 | 2205 | Nov 2010 | title application |
| Mrudul Dehankar | 25096990 | Maharashtra | 2004 | 2019 | 2256 | Dec 2019 | |
| Divya Deshmukh | 35006916 | Maharashtra | 9 Dec 2005 | 2018 | 2431 | Apr 2019 | title application |
| Saheli Dhar-Barua | 5001331 | West Bengal | 12 Apr 1974 | 2000 | 2248 | Jul 2001 | |
| Parnali S Dharia | 5043131 | Maharashtra | 16 Nov 1997 | 2014 | 2275 | Feb 2020 | |
| Ivana Maria Furtado | 5048400 | Goa | 16 Mar 1999 | 2012 | 2277 | Nov 2015 | |
| Shalmali Gagare | 5038650 | Maharashtra | 30 Jan 1994 | 2009 | 2165 | Sep 2009 | title application |
| Nimmy A George | 5015308 | Kerala | 1986 | 2023 | 2252 | Aug 2023 | |
| Anupama Gokhale | 5001005 | Maharashtra | 17 May 1969 | 1985 | 2253 | Jul 2003 | |
| Harshita Guddanti | 25043250 | Andhra Pradesh | 2001 | 2019 | 2182 | Sep 2015 | |
| Aakanksha Hagawane | 25014510 | Maharashtra | 2000 | 2016 | 2334 | Jun 2017 | |
| Monnisha G. K. | 5009936 | Tamil Nadu | 17 Oct 1998 | 2015 | 2295 | Apr 2018 | title application |
| Priyanka K. | 5082986 | Tamil Nadu | 3 Aug 2001 | 2019 | 2218 | Feb 2020 | title application |
| M. Kasturi | 5014034 | Tamil Nadu | 20 May 1987 | 2002 | 2198 | Oct 2001 | |
| Jayshree Khadilkar | 5001030 | Maharashtra | 25 Apr 1962 | 1979 | 2120 | Jan 1987 | |
| Rohini Khadilkar | 5000882 | Maharashtra | 1 Apr 1963 | 1984 | 2220 | Jul 1987 | |
| Vasanti Khadilkar | 5001021 | Maharashtra | 1 Apr 1961 | 1982 | 2135 | Jan 1990 | |
| Pon N. Krithika | 5019354 | Tamil Nadu | 22 Apr 1992 | 2012 | 2215 | Sep 2009 | title application |
| Mrunalini Kunte | 5001684 | Maharashtra | 23 Dec 1973 | 2000 | 2205 | Jul 1999 | |
| Sahiti P. Lakshmi | 5018650 | Andhra Pradesh | 19 Aug 1993 | 2007 | 2166 | Jan 2007 | |
| Mahalakshmi M | 5001080 | Tamil Nadu | 16 Oct 1998 | 2015 | 2255 | Sep 2019 | |
| Aashna Makhija | 25011944 | Maharashtra | 24 Sep 2002 | 2019 | 2245 | Apr 2019 | title application |
| Sai Meera | 5004357 | Tamil Nadu | 26 Jun 1977 | 2007 | 2227 | Jan 2008 | title application |
| Arpita Mukherjee | 5056403 | West Bengal | 31 May 2001 | 2019 | 2290 | Aug 2019 | title application |
| Vinuthna N. | 5015448 | Andhra Pradesh | 22 Aug 1987 | 2005 | 2268 | Apr 2005 | title application |
| Raghavi Nagarajan | 5017173 | Tamil Nadu | 28 Jan 1989 | 2013 | 2290 | Nov 2014 | title application |
| Priya P. | 5013550 | Tamil Nadu | 3 Oct 1987 | 2008 | 2208 | Apr 2008 | title application |
| Nutakki Priyanka | 25049615 | Andhra Pradesh | 1 Jun 2002 | 2018 | 2313 | Apr 2019 | title application |
| Rucha Pujari | 5024528 | Maharashtra | 2 Jul 1994 | 2017 | 2268 | Jul 2019 | title application |
| Rakshitta Ravi | 25073230 | Tamil Nadu | 24 Apr 2005 | 2019 | 2322 | Aug 2019 | title application |
| Saritha M. Reddy | 5001056 | Karnataka | 10 Jun 1972 | 1990 | 2235 | Jan 1998 | |
| Tejaswini Sagar | 5054290 | Gujarat | 3 Jan 2000 | 2016 | 2310 | Mar 2016 | title application |
| Saloni Sapale | 5085527 | Maharashtra | 12 Apr 1999 | 2018 | 2308 | Sep 2017 | title application |
| Pallavi Shah | 5003547 | Maharashtra | 15 Nov 1979 | 1999 | 2230 | Jan 1999 | |
| Isha Sharma | 35006665 | Karnataka | 29 Oct 2000 | 2019 | 2276 | Feb 2020 | title application |
| Bhagyashree Thipsay | 5001013 | Maharashtra | 4 Aug 1961 | 1986 | 2335 | Jul 1999 | |
| Prathiba Yuvarajan | 5009871 | Tamil Nadu | 1 Jul 1983 | 2003 | 2231 | Oct 2003 | |

== See also ==
- Chess in India
- List of chess grandmasters
- List of female chess players
