= Swayams Mishra =

Indian chess grandmaster (born 1992)

Personal information
- Born: 13 August 1992 (age 34) Cuttack, India

Chess career
- Country: India
- Title: Grandmaster (2019)
- FIDE rating: 2446 (October 2026)
- Peak rating: 2493 (June 2019)

Swayams Mishra (Odia: ସ୍ଵୟମ୍‍ସ ମିଶ୍ର) is an Indian chess grandmaster, FIDE-licensed chess trainer and former international master. He became India's 62nd chess grandmaster in May 2019 after completing his final grandmaster norm at the Polonia Wrocław GM Norm Tournament in Wrocław, Poland.

He is the 2nd Grandmaster from Odisha after Debashis Das.

== Career ==
Mishra learned to play chess at the age of six after his father brought a chessboard home. His sister also competed in chess and was ranked among the top 15 players nationally in her age category. He received early coaching from several players and coaches in Odisha, including Rajendra Prasad Sahoo, Satyaranjan Pattnaik, Rajendra Kumar Sahu, Subash Chandra Sahoo, and Manoj Kumar Panigrahi. He later trained with a number of international titled players and coaches, including Michael Roiz, Bartosz Socko, Jacob Aagaard, Farrukh Amonatov, and Sundararajan Kidambi.

Mishra was awarded the International Master title in February 2012.

He earned his first grandmaster norm at the KIIT Open in 2014. In 2015, he secured his second norm at the Isle of Man International Chess Tournament, where he defeated former World Championship challenger Jan Timman.

In May 2018, Mishra tied for second place at the Llucmajor Open in Mallorca, Spain, with a score of 6.5/9.

He completed his third and final grandmaster norm on 4 May 2019 at the Polonia Wrocław GM Norm Tournament in Wrocław, Poland. After defeating Antoni Kozak in the penultimate round and drawing his final-round game against Pranav Anand, he won the tournament with a score of 7/9, finishing one and a half points ahead of the nearest competitors.

Mishra became India's 62nd Grandmaster in 2019 after securing the required final norm at the Polonia Wrocław GM Norm Tournament.

== Coaching ==
In addition to his competitive career, he has worked as a chess trainer. Mishra earned the title of FIDE Trainer in 2018. His students have included players such as Sai Agni Jeevitesh, Adham Fawzy, Sankalp Gupta, Shrishti Pandey, Clarence Psaila, Mahitosh Dey, and Manish Kumar. One of his students became the youngest International Master in his age category in January 2024.

In 2024, Mishra served as assistant coach of the Indian women's team that won the gold medal at the 45th Chess Olympiad in Budapest, Hungary.

In 2026, he was appointed captain of the Indian women's team for the 46th Chess Olympiad.

== Education and other work ==
Mishra studied information technology at KIIT University in Bhubaneswar. He received support from the university during his engineering studies, allowing him to continue playing chess while completing his degree.

In a 2019 interview, Mishra said that after two years of engineering he had decided to pursue chess as a career while continuing to draw on his experience in information technology.
