= Kasparov (disambiguation) =

Garry Kasparov (born 1963) is a Russian chess grandmaster and former World Chess Champion.

Kasparov may also refer to:

== People ==
- Andrey Kasparov (born 1966), Armenian-American pianist, composer and professor
- Gevorg Kasparov (born 1980), Armenian football goalkeeper
- Sergey Kasparov (born 1968), Belarusian chess grandmaster
- Yuri Kasparov (born 1955), Russian composer
- Gennadi Kasparov , Russian mathematician

== Branded products ==
- Kasparov's Gambit, a 1993 chess video game by Electronic Arts
- Virtual Kasparov, a chess video game

== See also ==
- Gasparov, a similar Russian surname
