= Prathamesh =

Prathamesh is an Indian masculine given name. Notable people with the given name include:

- Prathamesh Dake (born 1991), Indian cricketer
- Prathamesh Fuge (born 2002), Indian archer
- Prathamesh Gawas (born 1994), Indian cricketer
- Prathamesh Jawkar (fl. 2022–present), Indian archer
- Prathamesh Laghate (fl. 2010–present), Indian singer
- Prathamesh Maulingkar (born 1991), Indian model and footballer
- Prathamesh Mokal (born 1983), Indian chess player
- Prathamesh Parab (born 1993), Indian actor
