= Leon Luke Mendonca =

Indian chess grandmaster (born 2006)

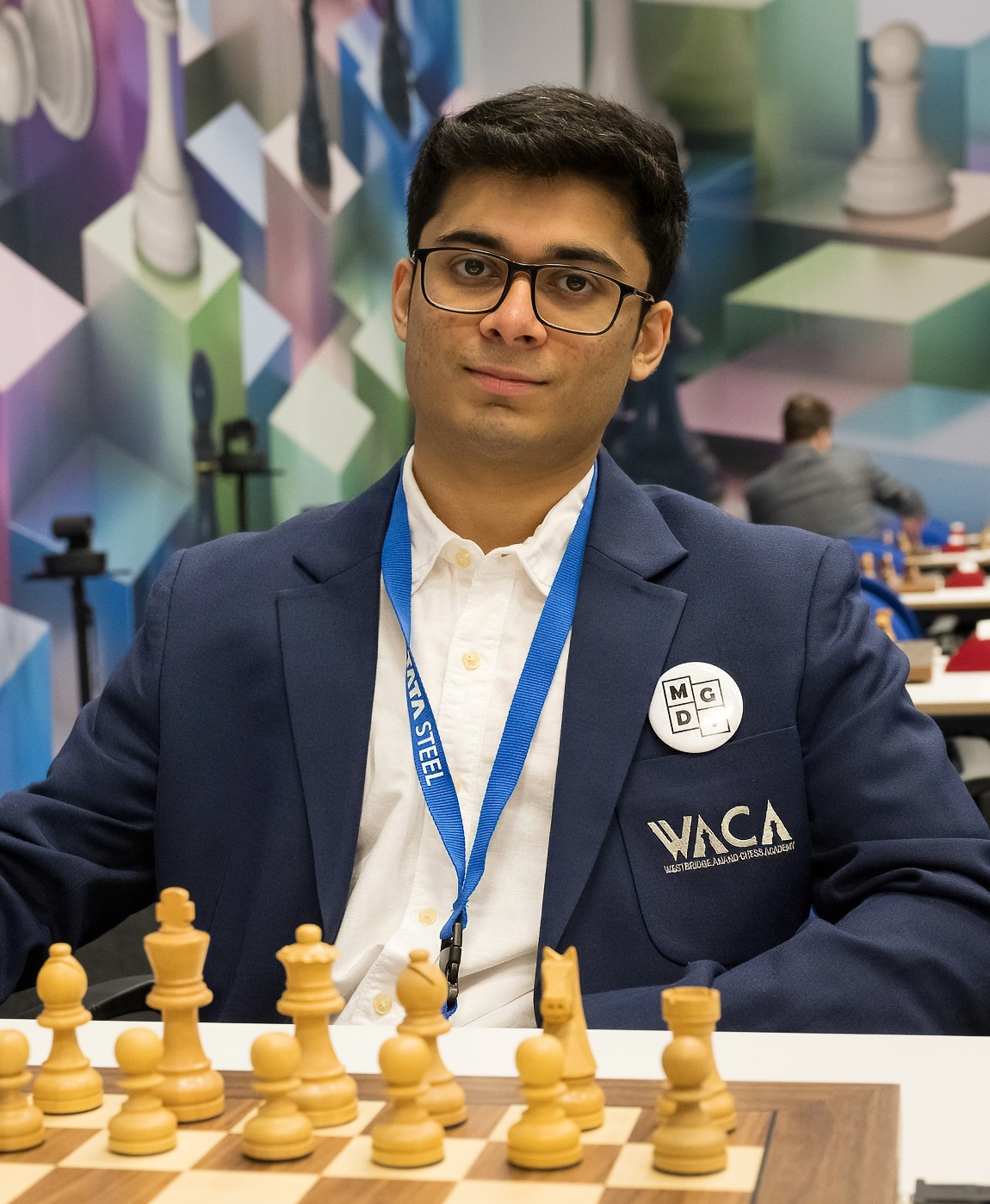
- Mendonca in 2025

Personal information
- Born: 13 March 2006 (age 20) Goa, India

Chess career
- Country: India
- Title: Grandmaster (2021)
- FIDE rating: 2616 (July 2026)
- Peak rating: 2643 (March 2025)
- Peak ranking: No. 85 (April 2025)

Leon Luke Mendonca (born 13 March 2006) is an Indian chess grandmaster. He is the sixty-seventh Indian to qualify for the title of Grandmaster, which FIDE awarded him in January 2021.

== Chess career ==
Mendonca became an International Master (IM) in 2019 at the age of 12 years, 11 months and 3 days. He was stranded in Eastern Europe due to COVID lockdowns in March 2020. He attained his first Grandmaster norm at the Rigochess Grandmaster tournament in Hungary in October 2020. Within a span of 21 days, he won another Grandmaster tournament at Budapest earning him the second Grandmaster norm. Mendonca achieved his third and final norm in December 2020 by finishing second at the Vergani Cup in Bassano del Grappa, Italy. He became the second grandmaster from the state of Goa after Anurag Mhamal achieving the feat at 14 years, 9 months and 17 days. He was officially awarded the title of grandmaster (GM) in January 2021.

In January 2024, Mendonca won the Challengers' section of the Tata Steel Chess Tournament, qualifying him for the Masters section in 2025.

== See also ==
- List of Indian chess players § Grandmasters
- Chess in India
