= Rahul Srivatshav Peddi =

Indian chess grandmaster (born 2002)

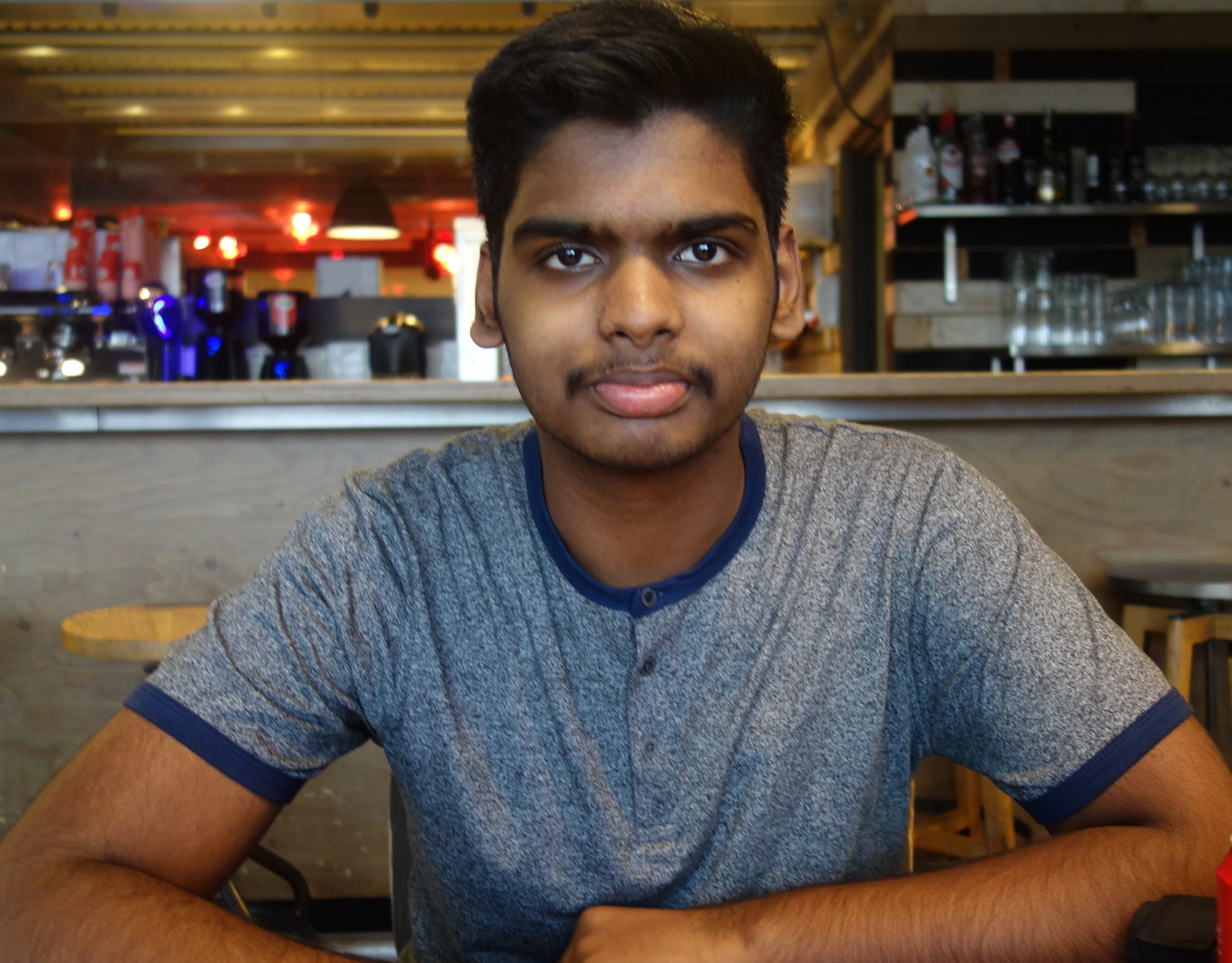
- Rahul Srivatshav Peddi at Chess Festival Groningen, December 2017

Personal information
- Born: 29 December 2002 (age 23) Guntur, Andhra Pradesh, India

Chess career
- Country: India
- Title: Grandmaster (2022)
- FIDE rating: 2466 (August 2026)
- Peak rating: 2501 (August 2024)

Rahul Srivatshav Peddi is an Indian grandmaster (GM) of chess, as recognized by FIDE. He was born on 29 December 2002, in Guntur. In 2018, he earned his international master (IM) title and went on to earn the grandmaster title in 2022, becoming India's 74th grandmaster of chess.

== Chess career ==
Rahul has been learning chess since the age of seven, being guided by his father on how to play the game. He began to attend tournaments and later, his father consulted Gangaraju Muralikrishna, a well-known chess coach in India. He immediately began improving, going on to finish fourth in the National Under-09 tournament in 2011, win a bronze medal after performing well in the Asian Youth Chess Championships 2012 Under 10 Open, and finish second in the National Under-11 tournament.

His next coach when he was rated 1700 would be Narahari Ramaraju, who helped him fine-tune his skills, especially in the opening. He studied for four years with the coach. He went to visit the United States, signing up for a membership with the Marshall Chess Club, allowing him to practice his skills with high-rated opponents.

In the 14th Dubai Juniors Chess Tournament in 2016, Rahul ranked second place, beating notable players like FM Viktor Matviishen during the tournament and getting 7.5/9 points at the end. In August 2017, he participated in the Riga Technical University Open in Latvia, winning his first IM norm. Later in December of the same year, he achieved his second IM norm at the Groningen Chess Festival. He achieved his third and final norm in the 2nd Vergani Cup 2018 in January, and as he crossed 2400 Elo, he was able to proclaim the international master (IM) title at 15 years old.

In 2019, Rahul earned three GM norms, but due to the COVID-19 pandemic, had to wait two years to return to competing in chess. His first norm was earned at the Open International Chania in Greece, where he earned 6.5/9 points. His second norm was earned at the GM Round Robin Orbis-4 in Paracin, Serbia, where he earned 7/9 points. His third norm was earned at the 4th Chess Festival Montebelluna-A in Montebelluna, Italy, earning 6.5/9 points. He earned his fourth norm when he placed a tied first place (after tiebreakers, second place) against GM Jose Eduardo Martinez Alcantara at the 2021 US Masters Championship, when he got 7/9 points, also earning $3,750 in prize money. Rahul finally reached the required 2500 elo rating to become a grandmaster after participating in the 9th Cattolica Chess Festival in 2022 in Italy. He earned his GM title from FIDE in 2022 at 19-years-old after this win.

In 2021, he applied to the University of Texas at Dallas to study economics after earning a full scholarship and participates in the college's chess team, with the college covering his tournament expenses, according to an interview. He learns from the university's team coach, GM Julio Sadorra, and is personally coached by GM Sipke Ernst.

In the 2023 Texas State Championship, he got second place after getting 5.5/7 points during the tournament. In November 2023, he participated in a club match between the Marshall Chess Club and the Texas Chess Center, playing on behalf of the Texas Chess Center. He played alongside other titled players such as NM Nelson Lopez and WGM Anastasya Paramzina and played against GM Aleksandr Lenderman. He lost 3 matches against Aleksandr and drew one match, and the Marshall Chess Club won the tournament.

== Education ==
From the 1st to 9th standard, he attended Sadhu Vaswani International School in Hyderabad. From the 10th to 12th standard, he attended NIOS, allowing him to get his education in an easier manner.

In 2021, he applied to the University of Texas at Dallas to attend an undergraduate course in economics and finance, after receiving a full scholarship from the university. Currently, he still attends and studies at the university.

== See also ==
- List of Indian chess players
- Chess in India
- List of chess grandmasters
