= Sahiti P. Lakshmi =

Indian chess player

Personal information
- Born: 19 August 1993 (age 32) Vijayawada, Andhra Pradesh, India

Chess career
- Country: India
- Title: Woman International Master (2007)
- FIDE rating: 2108 (March 2012)
- Peak rating: 2166 (January 2007)

Pinnamaneni Lakshmi Sahithi (born 1993 in Vijayawada, Krishna District, Andhra Pradesh, India) is an Indian chess player.

== Biography ==
She was awarded the Woman International Master (WIM) FIDE title in 2007 at the age of 13.

She was the Asian Junior Runner up in 2006. In 2009, Lakshmi Sahithi was the National Women Challenger's champion in Nagpur, India and became the National Women open champion at the age of 15. She has won numerous other titles including two Commonwealth Champion titles and numerous Asian and National championship titles. A list of other notable titles is available below –

- Women open rated chess champion - Sangli, Maharastra in 2005
- Asian U-16 chess champion - Kyrgyzstan in 2005 (at the age of 12)
- National Sub Junior Champion consecutively in 2005 and 2006
- National U-18 silver medalist in 2004 (at the age of 11)
- Asian team silver – Singapore in 2004
- Commonwealth U-14 gold Mumbai, India
- 4th place in World U-14 - 2006 in Bautumi, Georgia
- National Champion
  1. U-8 in 2000
  2. U-10 in 2002
  3. U-12 in 2004
  4. U-14 in 2006
- Asian Champion
  1. U-10 in 2001
  2. U-12 in 2003
  3. U-14 in 2005
- Commonwealth Champion
  1. U-10 in 2002
  2. U-12 in 2004

As of March 2012, her FIDE standard rating is 2108. Lakshmi Sahithi is the third Telugu woman to win the Woman International Master (WIM) title. Others are Koneru Humpy, Dronavalli Harika, and Bodda Pratyusha.
