= Gasparov =

Gasparov (Russian: Гаспаров) and Gasparova (feminine; Гаспарова) is a Russian surname.

People with this surname include:

- Mikhail Gasparov (1935–2005), Russian philologist and translator
- Samvel Gasparov (1938-2020), Soviet and Russian film director

== See also ==
- Kasparov
