= Shardul Gagare =

Indian chess grandmaster (born 1997)

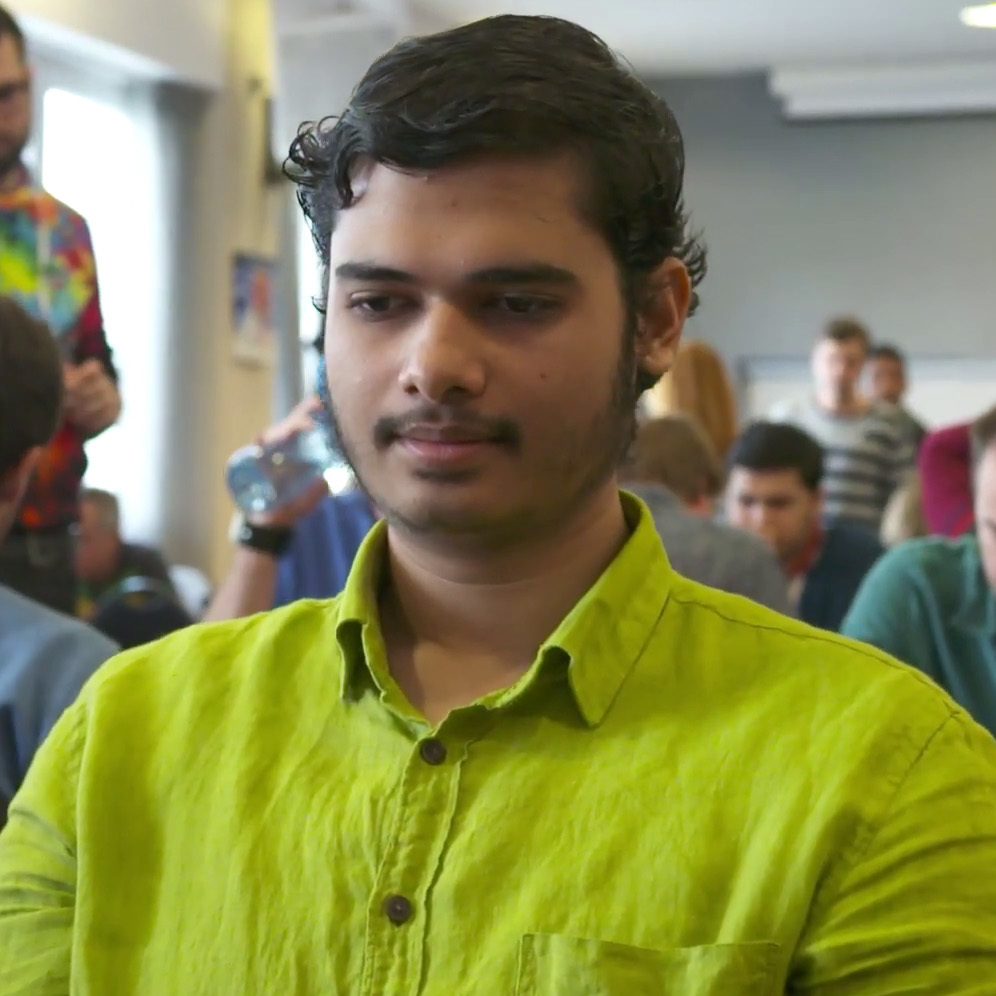

Personal information
- Born: Shardul Annasaheb Gagare; 2 September 1997 (age 28) Sangamner, Maharashtra, India

Chess career
- Country: India
- Title: Grandmaster (2016)
- FIDE rating: 2439 (July 2026)
- Peak rating: 2521 (August 2022)

Shardul Gagare (born 2 September 1997 in Sangamner) is an Indian chess player. He received the FIDE title of Grandmaster (GM) in 2016 and became the 42nd Grandmaster from India. Shardul is brother to Indian WIM Shalmali Gagare.
