= Scottish Church Collegiate School =

Scottish Church Collegiate School (SCCS)

Location
- 73, Bidhan Sarani, 32/8, Beadon Street, Kolkata – 700006, West Bengal, India. 22.5913093°N 88.3692459°E

Information
- Type: Private
- Religious affiliation: Church of North India
- Established: 13 July 1830; 196 years ago
- Founder: Alexander Duff & Raja Rammohan Roy
- President: Rt. Rev. Dr. Paritosh Canning, Bishop of Kolkata.
- Headmaster: Bivash Saniel
- Houses: Rammohan (red); Vivekananda (orange); Netaji (green); Duff (blue)
- Nickname: SCOTTISHIANS
- Affiliation: WBBSE & WBCHSE
- Website: www.sccskolkata.in

The Scottish Church Collegiate School is a school in north Kolkata, West Bengal, India. This school has three branches: Bidhan Sarani (Kolkata), Kestopur (Krishnapur, Kolkata) and Beadon Street (Kolkata).

== Notable former pupils ==
- Anindya Chatterjee, film and music director, singer, lyricist and actor
- Tanishk Bagchi, music producer, composer, singer and lyricist
- Sayantan Das, chess player
- Manna Dey, singer, music director and musician
- Dhan Gopal Mukerji, writer
- Badal Sircar, dramatist and theatre director

== See also ==
- Scottish Church College, the twin institution of the school, also founded by Duff.
- List of schools in India
- Education in West Bengal
