= Sergey Kasparov =

Belarusian chess grandmaster (born 1968)

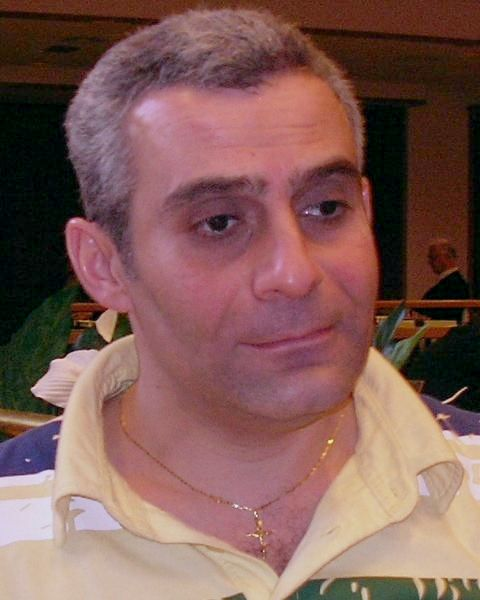
- Kasparov in 2011

Personal information
- Born: August 8, 1968 (age 57) Mogilev, Byelorussian SSR, Soviet Union
- Spouse: Tatiana Kasparova

Chess career
- Country: Belarus (until 2022); FIDE (since 2022)
- Title: Grandmaster (2007)
- FIDE rating: 2427 (July 2026)
- Peak rating: 2546 (January 2007)

Sergey Vladimirovich Kasparov is a Belarusian chess grandmaster.

== Chess career ==
In August 2008, he played in the Arctic Chess Challenge. He finished in 8th place after an eleven-move draw against Vitaly Kunin in the final round.

In January 2016, he played in the Groningen Festival, where he finished 9th after losing to eventual winner Jorden van Foreest in the final round.

In April 2018, he played in the Kathmandu Open, where he was in the joint lead after the fourth round, but was defeated by Shyaam Nikhil P. in the seventh round.

In October 2018, he played in the Gujarat Open, where he was held to a draw by Gaurav Kumar in the final round. Later that month, he played in the Goa International Open, where he defeated Vitaliy Bernadskiy in the ninth round, and was tied for first after the round.

== Personal life ==
He is married to Tatiana Kasparova, with whom he has one daughter. He is not related to former World Chess Champion Garry Kasparov.
