= Arjun Kalyan =

Indian chess grandmaster (born 2002)

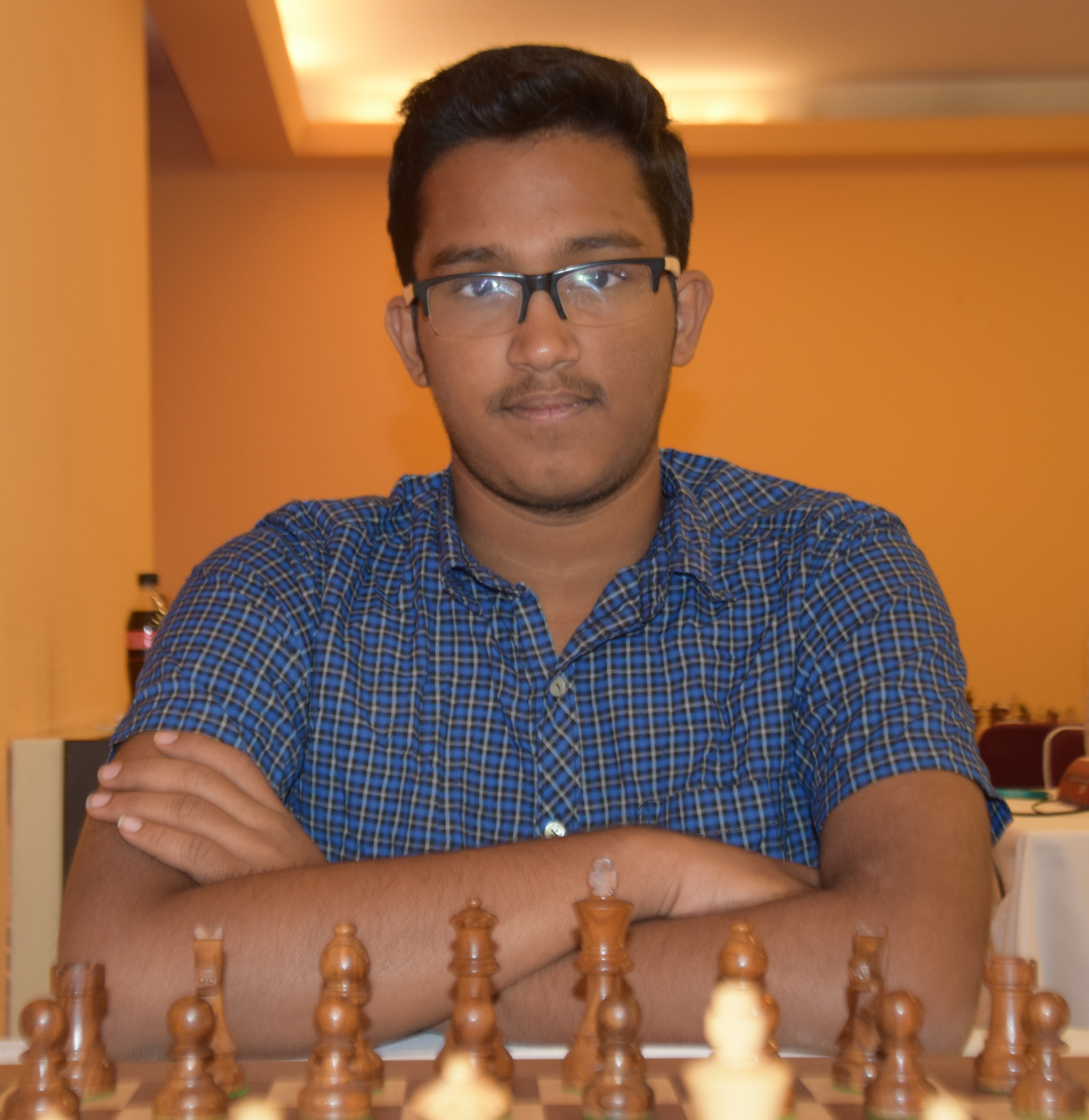
- Kalyan at the 2017 Andorra open

Personal information
- Born: 17 June 2002 (age 24) Chennai, Tamil Nadu, India

Chess career
- Country: India
- Title: Grandmaster (2021)
- FIDE rating: 2509 (July 2026)
- Peak rating: 2537 (October 2021)

Arjun Kalyan (born 17 June 2002), is an Indian chess player. He has the title of Grandmaster, which FIDE awarded him in April 2021.

== Chess career ==
Kalyan became an International Master (IM) in 2018. He attained his first Grandmaster norm at the Biel Chess Festival in Biel, Switzerland in July 2018. At the International Chess Open held at Roquetas de Mar, Spain in January 2019, he would earn his second Grandmaster norm. Kalyan achieved his third and final norm in April 2019 at the Budapest Spring Festival in Budapest, Hungary. At the 2019 Under-18 World Championship held in Mumbai, India, Kalyan drew his last match against the top seeded player, enabling his fellow country grandmaster Rameshbabu Praggnanandhaa to win the title.

== Personal life ==
Kalyan, a student at the Vellammal Vidyalaya, Chennai scored 93% in his Class X exams in 2018 despite having spent most of his time preparing for his next chess tournaments.

== See also ==
- List of Indian chess players § International Masters
- Chess in India
