= Vishal Sareen =

Indian chess player

Personal information
- Born: 1 January 1973 (age 53)

Chess career
- Country: India
- Title: International Master (2004)
- Peak rating: 2409 (April 2004)

Vishal Sareen (born in 1973) is an International Master of chess. He has coached several well-known Grand Masters and International Masters in chess in his two decades of coaching. He was awarded with the UT Dallas Trainer Award in chess and holds the FIDE Senior Trainer (FST) title. He has coached the Indian women's team in multiple world and Asian tournaments.
