= Shyaam Nikhil P. =

Indian chess grandmaster (born 1992)

Shyaam Nikhil P
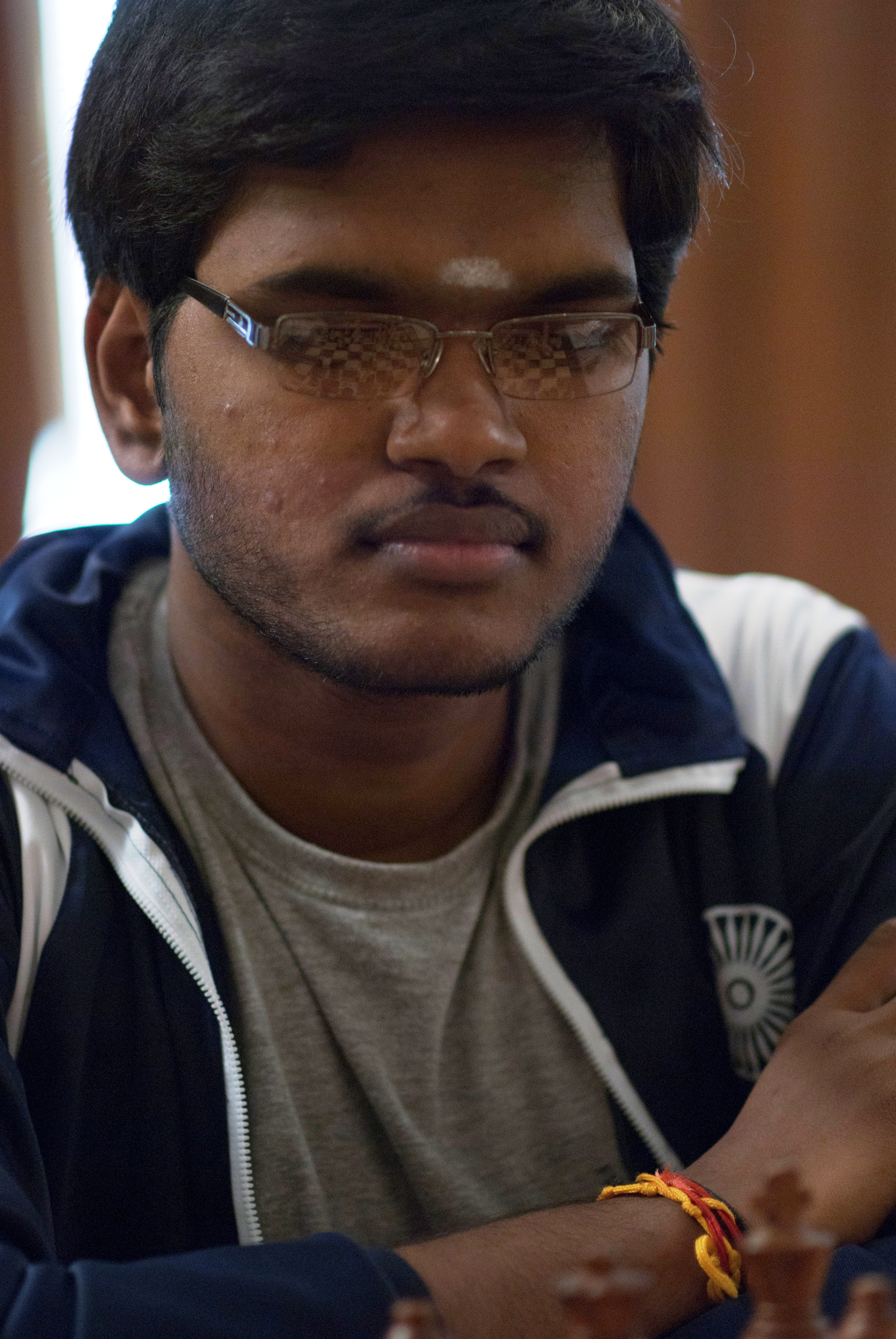
- Nikhil in 2012

Personal information
- Born: 21 March 1992 (age 34) Nagercoil, Tamilnadu, India

Chess career
- Country: India
- Title: Grandmaster (2024)
- FIDE rating: 2432 (October 2026)
- Peak rating: 2502 (May 2012)

Shyaam Nikhil Ponnusamy (Tamil: ஷ்யாம் நிகில் பொன்னுசாமி) is an Indian chess grandmaster.

== Career ==
He started playing chess tournaments at the age of 11. In 2007, he won the World Youth Chess Olympiad while representing India-U16, with Adhiban Baskaran, R. Ashwath, S. Nitin, and Swayams Mishra. In 2009, he participated in Asian Youth Chess Championship in Under-18 category, where he narrowly missed the Gold.

In September 2011, he made his maiden GM norm while competing in the 4th Mayor's Cup International Chess Tournament, in Mumbai. He got his second GM norm in the following month while competing in National Premier Chess Championship, 2011.

Nikhil won the 26th National Youth Under-25 Chess Championship in 2017, where he scored 8 points over 9 rounds. The event included 122 International Masters (IM).

In 2022, he won the Commonwealth Chess Championship, in Sri Lanka.

In May 2024, Nikhil became a Grandmaster after securing his final norm. The title was awarded later by FIDE in August 2024.
