= Raahul V S =

Indian chess grandmaster (born 2003)

Personal information
- Born: February 9, 2003 (age 23) Chennai, India

Chess career
- Country: India
- Title: Grandmaster (2025)
- FIDE rating: 2402 (July 2026)
- Peak rating: 2478 (January 2022)

Raahul Vijayakumar Srinivasan is an Indian chess grandmaster.

== Career ==
He started playing chess at the age of 6, and trained under Ramachandran Ramesh and Shyam Sundar M.

In November 2025, he won the 6th ASEAN Individual Open Governor Henry S Oaminal Cup with a score of 7/9. He had won the championship with one round to spare and by a margin of 1.5 points over the runner-up, directly earning the Grandmaster title. He became India's 91st Grandmaster.

== Personal life ==
He earned a master's degree in business administration at SRM University.
