= Isha Sharma =

Indian chess player (born 2000)

Personal information
- Born: 29 October 2000 (age 25) Belthangady, India

Chess career
- Country: India
- Title: Woman Grandmaster (2026)
- Peak rating: 2325 (August 2022)

Isha Sharma is an Indian chess player from Belthangady, Dakshina Kannada district, Karnataka. She holds the title of Woman Grandmaster (WGM) and is the first woman from Karnataka.

== Early life ==
Sharma hails from Belthangady in coastal Karnataka. She took up chess at a young age and trained through state-level coaching programmes.

== Chess career ==
Sharma achieved success in state and national tournaments and won the Karnataka State Women's Chess Championship, establishing herself as a top player in the state. Sharma secured her Woman Grandmaster norms at international tournaments held in Slovakia, Morocco, and Serbia, completing her final norm in 2025.

== Woman Grandmaster title ==
In November 2025, Sharma completed all requirements for the Woman Grandmaster title, becoming Karnataka's first Woman Grandmaster and the 27th Indian woman to receive the title.

== Playing profile ==
Sharma regularly competes in national and international tournaments and is listed in the FIDE rating database. She is also involved in training and mentoring young chess players in Karnataka.
