= Himanshu Sharma (chess player) =

Indian chess grandmaster (born 1983)

Personal information
- Born: 16 September 1983 (age 42) Rohtak, India

Chess career
- Country: India
- Title: Grandmaster (2017)
- Peak rating: 2514 (August 2017)

Himanshu Sharma is an Indian chess grandmaster.

== Career ==
In April 2017, he crossed the 2500 rating mark after scoring a win in the fifth round of the 1st Sardar Prakash Singh Memorial. With this, he became India's 47th grandmaster and the first grandmaster from the province of Haryana.

In July 2017, he won the Barbera Del Valles Open, finishing half a point ahead of runner-up Karen H. Grigoryan. This was his first Open tournament win outside of India.

In June 2022, he was one of the bearers of the Chess Olympiad torch.
