= Thejkumar M. S. =

Indian chess grandmaster (born 1981)

Personal information
- Born: 1 January 1981 (age 45) Mysore, India

Chess career
- Country: India
- Title: Grandmaster (2017)
- Peak rating: 2500 (October 2017)

Thejkumar Mysore Shivarame is an Indian chess grandmaster.

== Chess career ==
Thejkumar began learning chess from his father at the age of 12. He is the first GM from the state of Karnataka, and achieved six norms (three IM norms and three GM norms) from December 2007 to May 2008. In September 2017, his rating surpassed the 2500+ requirement for the Grandmaster title, allowing him to achieve it at age 36; much later in life than most players who have earned the title.

In June 2018, Thejkumar won the Karnataka State Level Open Rapid Chess Tournament, with a perfect score of 9/9.

Thejkumar's achievements include winning the 2013 Indian National B championship and the 2003 National U-25 Championship. Outside of India, he has won tournaments such as the 2016 Liffre Open and the 2017 Guingamp Open.

He was also part of the appeals committee for the 14th National Schools Chess Championship in India from 27th to 31st December 2025.
