= Fenil Shah =

Indian chess player (born 1995)

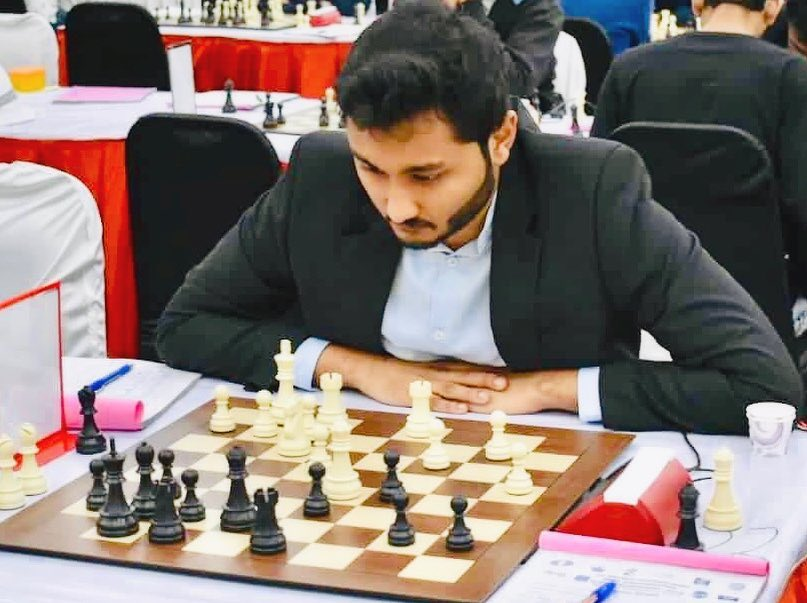
- Shah in 2018

Personal information
- Born: 20 April 1995 (age 31) Ahmedabad, Gujarat, India

Chess career
- Country: India
- Title: International Master (2018)
- FIDE rating: 2352 (May 2019)
- Peak rating: 2412 (August 2018)

Fenil Shah (born 20 April 1995) is an Indian chess player, who holds the FIDE title of International Master (IM). He was the youngest rated chess player in 2002 and also the youngest chess player to represent Indian Team.

== Early life and education ==
Fenil Shah was born in Ahmedabad, Gujarat, India. He did his early schooling at Udgam School and pursued high school at St.Xaviers Loyola hall. Shah graduated with Bachelor's in Civil Engineering from Nirma University in 2017. Fenil was introduced to the chessboard at the age of five. He has a Masters in Construction Management from Purdue University in West Lafayette, United States.

== Chess career ==
Fenil was introduced to the chessboard at the age of five. His journey began when he won his first-ever state Championship U-7 category. In 2002, he finished third in the U-7 Category National Championship in Lucknow. He was also adjudicated as the youngest-rated player of India in the same year.

In August 2003, he won the British U-11 and U-9 Categories at Smith and Williamson British Championship in Edinburg, Scotland. He also won the silver medal in Commonwealth Youth Championship U10 in 2003. Consequently, in 2005 he secured a silver medal in Asian Youth U10 Championship in New Delhi.

In 2006, he became the National U11 Champion of India and got selected for the India Team to represent India on international platforms. Later on, he went on to win myriad Asian and Commonwealth Medals at international platforms in consecutive years.

In the Chennai Open in 2010, Fenil finished with 8 points out of 11, one point behind the eventual winner Turov Maxim. He defeated Grandmaster Gutov Andrey in the tournament and secured his first International Master Norm.

He earned the title of FIDE Master (FM) after breaching the 2300 Elo rating mark in the Catalan Circuit.

He secured his second International Master Norm in Rilton Cup 2017–18 in Stockholm, Sweden defeating International Master Krisel Robert in the final crucial game. In Aeroflot Open in Moscow, Russia Shah earned his final International Norm with a round to spare and thus completed his norm requirements. Fenil completed his title formalities in May 2018 when he had a published rating of 2411, thus completing the rating criteria and becoming an International Master. He was awarded the International Master Title in the 2nd Presidential Board Meeting at Bucharest, Romania.
