= Anuj Shrivatri =

Indian chess player

Personal information
- Born: 21 July 2004 (age 22) Katni, Madhya Pradesh, India

Chess career
- Country: India
- Title: International Master (2020)
- FIDE rating: 2450 (November 2026)
- Peak rating: 2483 (June 2026)

Anuj Shrivatri (born 2004) is an Indian chess player who holds the title of International Master (IM), and is a grandmaster-elect (as of Nov 2026). He is celebrated as India's 100th Grandmaster ( Nov 2026).

== Career ==
Anuj started playing chess at the age of 6. He was coached by various chess players, including VK Tiwari, Yashpal Arora, Rajesh Bahadur, and Niklesh Kumar Jain. He secured 3rd place at the National Under-13 Championship (2016) and 4th place at the World Youth Under-14 Championship (2017).

He completed 3 IM Norms and achieved a FIDE rating of 2400 to earn the International Master title by the age of 15, becoming Central India's and Madhya Pradesh's youngest IM.

Anuj Shrivatri pursued his B.tech in Computer Science (specialization in AI and Machine Learning) at Lovely Professional University, Punjab in 2025. He also completed a remote internship with German company INTEGRTR, but later turned down a full-time software engineer job in pursuit of the GM title.

At the 7th ASEAN Plus Individual Open Chess Championship (Nov 2026), Anuj scored 7/8 points (after losing the first round), winning the tournament. This victory earned him the Grandmaster title, bypassing the conventional GM norms requirement. He became India's 100th Grandmaster, 38 years after India's first GM, Vishwanathan Anand. He is also Madhya Pradesh's 1st ever GM.
