= Rohith Krishna S =

Indian chess grandmaster (born 2005)

Personal information
- Born: December 26, 2005 (age 20) Chennai, India

Chess career
- Country: India
- Title: Grandmaster (2025)
- FIDE rating: 2489 (July 2026)
- Peak rating: 2516 (July 2025)

Rohith Krishna S is an Indian chess player, who holds the title of grandmaster. He is pursuing an engineering degree from SSN College.
