= Aditya Samant =

Indian chess grandmaster (born 2006)

Personal information
- Born: September 9, 2006 (age 20) Pune, India

Chess career
- Country: India
- Title: Grandmaster (2023)
- FIDE rating: 2559 (November 2026)
- Peak rating: 2559 (November 2026)

Aditya Sachin Samant (born 2006) is an Indian chess grandmaster.

== Career ==
Aditya began playing chess at the age of 6. He trained under Chandrashekhar Gokhale, Jayant Gokhale, Abhijit Kunte, and Alexander Goloshchapov.

Aditya earned his first GM norm at the Abu Dhabi Masters in August 2022 and his second GM norm at the El Llobregat Open in December 2023. He also crossed the 2500 rating mark in May 2023.

In July 2023, Aditya became a grandmaster after earning his final norm at the Master Tournament of the Biel International Chess Festival by drawing against Bu Xiangzhi in the 8th round of the 9-round tournament. He only needed to play the final game against Aryan Chopra to secure the title, regardless of the game's result.

== Personal life ==
Aditya is studying computer science at the University of Texas at Dallas. He previously studied science at the CBSE, Suryadatta National School, Pune and in Abhinava Vidyalaya English Medium Primary School.
