= Dhyani Dave =

Indian chess player

Personal information
- Born: 21 August 1991 (age 34) Gujarat, India

Chess career
- Country: India
- Title: Woman International Master (2013)
- FIDE rating: 2065 (September 2018)
- Peak rating: 2205 (November 2010)

Dhyani Dave (born 21 August 1991 in Gujarat) is an Indian chess player who holds the FIDE title of Woman International Master.

She has won gold medals at the Under 14 Asian Chess Championship and the Under 16 Commonwealth Chess Championship. She is a silver medalist at the Under 10 Asian Championship and the Under 12 Commonwealth Championship. In August 2012, she played with 150 rated chess players at Mahatma Mandir, Gujarat and entered in Limca Book of Records.

At the age of nine she played Bollywood star and chess enthusiast Aamir Khan on the set of the film Lagaan.

In 2018 she alleged that gender bias by the Gujarat state in denying her a government job had also impacted her chess career.

She is an owner of the Dhyan Chess Academy in Ahmedabad where she teaches. In 2019 she won in the Sports category of the iWoman Global Awards.
