= Venkatesh M. R. =

Indian chess grandmaster (born 1985)

Personal information
- Born: 20 May 1985 (age 41) Chennai, India

Chess career
- Country: India
- Title: Grandmaster (2012)
- Peak rating: 2528 (October 2018)

Venkatesh Marani Rajendran is an Indian chess grandmaster.

== Chess career ==
In July 2012, Venkatesh earned his Grandmaster title after finishing second to Abhijeet Gupta at the Philadelphia International Chess Tournament.

In the seventh round of the MPL 59th National Senior Chess Championship 2022, Venkatesh defeated Gupta to share the tournament lead with Mitrabha Guha and S. P. Sethuraman.

In February 2023, Venkatesh won the 21st Dolomitenbank Open Lienz by defeating Sandipan Chanda in the final round.
