= Girish A. Koushik =

Indian chess grandmaster (born 1997)

Personal information
- Born: August 31, 1997 (age 29) Sringeri, India

Chess career
- Country: India
- Title: Grandmaster (2019)
- FIDE rating: 2492 (October 2026)
- Peak rating: 2506 (November 2019)

Girish Arun Koushik (born August 31, 1997) is an Indian chess grandmaster from Karnataka. He won the World Youth Chess Championship under-10 in 2006. He has also been a medalist in the Asian Youth Chess Championships under 8, 10, 12, 14 and 16. He became India's 63rd Grandmaster on 2019, at the age of 22.

== Chess career ==
In 2005, Girish won the Asian Youth Chess Championship under 8 years old. In next year, 2006, he won the World Youth Chess Championship Under-10, taking place in Batumi, Georgia, scoring 9.5 points in 11 rounds. In 2008, Girish won the Asian Youth Chess Championships Under 12 taking place in Teheran, Iran and in 2011, he won the Asian Youth Chess Championships Under 14. In 2013, Girish tied in first place of the World Youth Chess Championship Under 16 in Al Ain with 9 points in 11 rounds, eventually receiving the silver medal based on the tiebreaks.

Until May 2019, Girish had one Grandmaster norm and a peak rating of 2444. After playing in the Llucmajor Open in Mallorca and two norm tournaments in Hungary, he scored his second and third Grandmaster norms and achieved a rating of 2500.7, fulfilling all the requirements for the Grandmaster title.

== Personal life ==
In May 2019, Girish graduated from R.V. College of Engineering completing an Electronics and Communications Engineering degree.

After his undergraduate degree, he completed his master's degree in computer science with AI at the University of Strathclyde in 2023 and is currently undertaking a PhD in computer science at the University of Surrey.

In April 2025 Girish attended a conference hosted in Sydney Australia. Having brought back TimTams for his colleagues, they have appeared in supermarkets in England.
