= Sayantan Das =

Indian chess grandmaster (born 1997)

Personal information
- Born: 8 April 1997 (age 29) Kolkata, India

Chess career
- Country: India
- Title: Grandmaster (2023)
- FIDE rating: 2408 (July 2026)
- Peak rating: 2516 (April 2023)

Sayantan Das (born 8 April 1997) is an Indian chess grandmaster.

== Biography ==
He studied at the Scottish Church Collegiate School in North Kolkata. He later studied commerce at the Scottish Church College between 2014 and 2017. He works at Metro Railway Kolkata.

== Chess career ==
He who won the World Youth Chess Championship (boys) in 2008 which was held at Vietnam. He is a student at the Goodricke National Chess Academy at Kolkata, which has also produced the present under-10 Asian champion, Diptayan Ghosh.

International Master Saptarshi Roy has coached him.

Sayantan Das on 4 July 2014 won maiden grand master norm.

He crossed the 2500 Elo rating benchmark in 2023, becoming the 81st grandmaster from India.
