= Pranav Anand =

Indian chess grandmaster (born 2006)

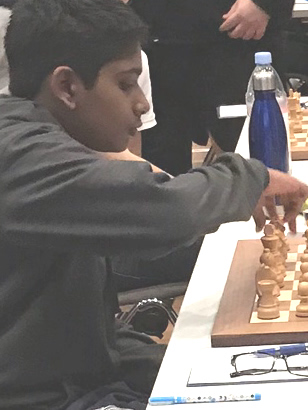

Personal information
- Born: 3 November 2006 (age 19) Tiruchirappalli, India

Chess career
- Country: India
- Title: Grandmaster (2022)
- FIDE rating: 2606 (October 2026)
- Peak rating: 2607 (November 2026)

Pranav Anand is an Indian chess grandmaster.

== Career ==
In September 2022, Pranav won the U16 section of the World Youth Chess Championship. He also crossed the 2500 rating mark during the event, securing the Grandmaster title.

In July 2023, Pranav won the Rapid portion of the Biel Chess Festival with an undefeated score of 8/9 ahead of Shawn Rodrigue-Lemieux and Marco Materia, who both scored 7.5/9.

In September 2023, Pranav was leading the World Junior Chess Championship after defeating Kirk Ghazarian in the 6th round.

In July 2025, Pranav finished at second place in the Biel Masters Open with 7½/10.
