= Sundararajan Kidambi =

Indian chess grandmaster (born 1982)

Personal information
- Born: 29 December 1982 (age 43) Chennai, India

Chess career
- Country: India
- Title: Grandmaster (2009)
- Peak rating: 2526 (January 2010)

Sundararajan Kidambi is an Indian chess grandmaster.

== Career ==
He is India's 19th Grandmaster, and trained with top grandmaster Krishnan Sasikiran. Sundararajan achieved his GM norms at the:

- Canadian Open International Chess Tournament in July 2005
- Badalona International Open in August 2008
- Dubai Open in May 2009

In June 2017, he was held to draw by Anup Deshmukh in the Catalan Chess Circuit in Montcada, Spain.

In October 2018, he held Vladimir Kramnik (who was rated over 300 points higher) to a draw in first round of the Isle of Man International Tournament.

In October 2019, he finished in joint seventh place at the Liffré International Open in France with a score of 6/9.
