= Prathamesh Mokal =

Indian chess player (born 1983)

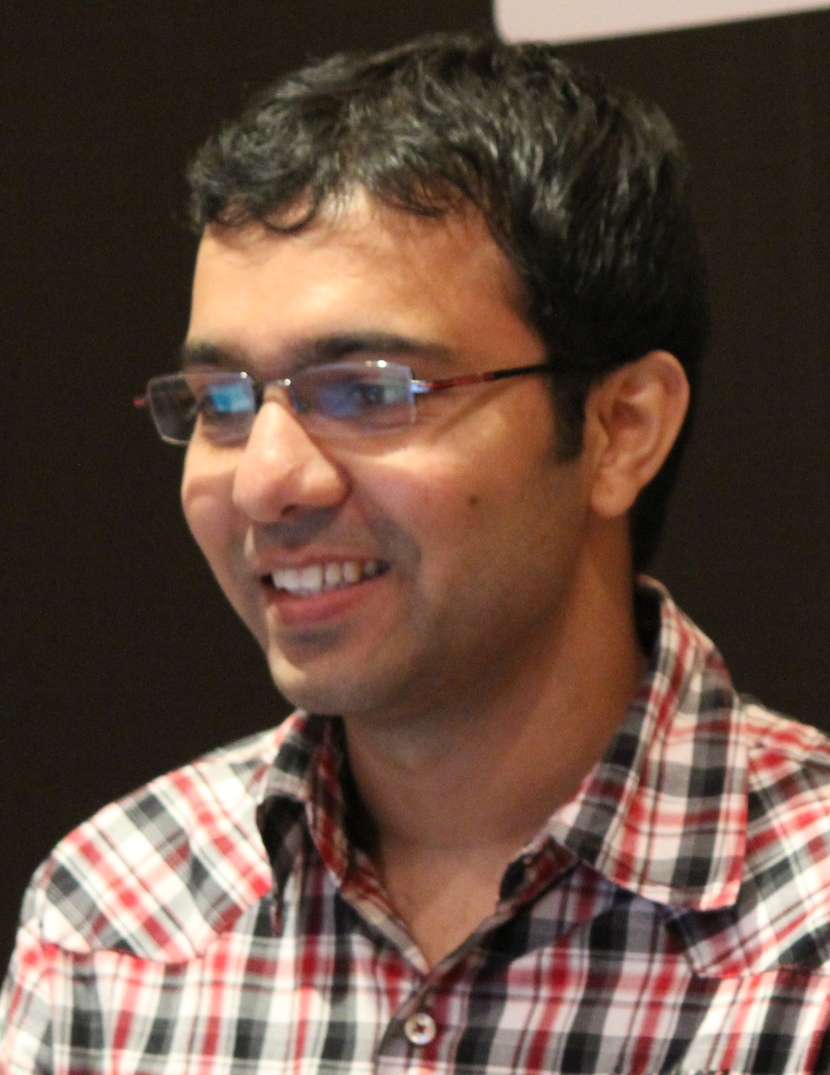

Personal information
- Born: Prathamesh Sunil Mokal; 1 October 1983 (age 42) Pune, Maharashtra, India

Chess career
- Country: India
- Title: International Master (2003)
- Peak rating: 2411 (May 2010)

Prathamesh Mokal (born 1 October 1983) is an Indian chess player. He is an International Master as well as FIDE Trainer, and won the Shiv Chhatrapati Award (2005). He is also a black belt (Sho Dan) in karate and koryū. He received the Shiv-Chhatrapati Award from Maharashtra government in 2004 for his achievements in Chess.

He was a part of live web video commentary during the World Junior Chess Championship 2014. held in Pune.

Prathamesh reviewed the latest version of the most popular professional chess software ChessBase13. He gives a trainer's perspective while explaining some of its fundamental functions. He also annotated the games in the article written by Sagar Shah on Al Ain tournament.

== Chess career ==
- FIDE Trainer – 2012 (Unprecedented 100% score in exam)
1. 3rd place at Thailand Open Chess 2010.
2. 1 Grandmaster (GM) norm – 2009
3. National Challengers Champion – 2007
4. 6 times National Premier Qualifier – 2002 to 2010
5. 7 times State Champion in various age groups – 1992 to 2002
6. International Master (IM)- 2003
7. Commonwealth Junior Bronze medalist Commonwealth Chess Championship - 2003
8. Asian Junior Joint Champion – 2003
9. Bronze at U-14 Nationals (Both Classical and Rapid) Silver at U-18 Nationals

== Coaching ==
Prathamesh was a Coach of Mumbai Movers team in the Maharashtra Chess League, held in Pune in June 2014.

His student Saloni Sapale won silver in the World Amateur Chess Championship, (Women) held at Singapore in April–May 2014. She won the silver medal at World school Chess Championship in the Under-17 age group in 2015. She became an International Woman Master (IWM) in 2018 for which she won the State's prestigious award: The Shiv Chattrapati Award in 2019.

His student Raahil Mullick won gold medal at Commonwealth Chess Championship in the Under 10 age group in 2017. He became an International Master (IM) at the age of 12 in October 2019.
