= Debashis Das =

Indian chess grandmaster (born 1993)

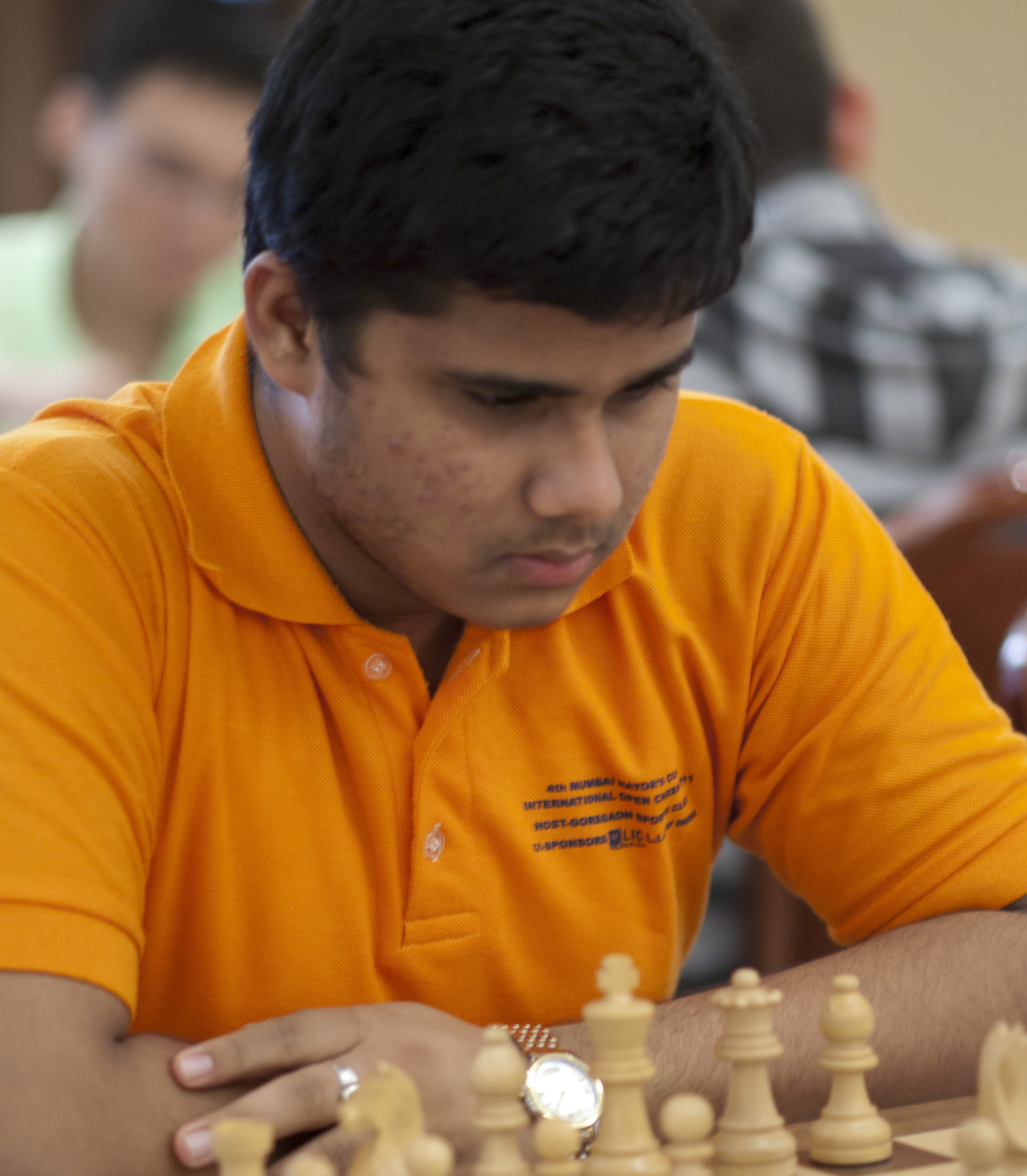
- Debashis in 2012

Personal information
- Born: 27 June 1993 (age 33) Bhubaneswar, Odisha, India

Chess career
- Country: India
- Title: Grandmaster (2013)
- FIDE rating: 2491 (October 2026)
- Peak rating: 2548 (September 2018)

Debashis Das is an Indian chess grandmaster.

== Career ==
In October 2013, Debashis crossed the 2500 rating mark after winning against Anirudha Deshpande in the National Challenger held in Bhopal, becoming the first Grandmaster from Odisha.

In July 2015, he was declared as the brand ambassador of Odisha-based milk federation Omfed.

In November 2017, he defeated Aravindh Chithambaram in the final round of the National Premier Chess Championship, finishing in fourth place.

In July 2018, he won the bronze medal in the Commonwealth Chess Championships.

In January 2019, he led the Delhi International Open after the sixth round alongside Masoud Mosadeghpour.

He has trained in a Grandmaster Training Festival in May 2023 organised by Kingdom of Chess.
