= Anurag Mhamal =

Indian chess grandmaster (born 1995)

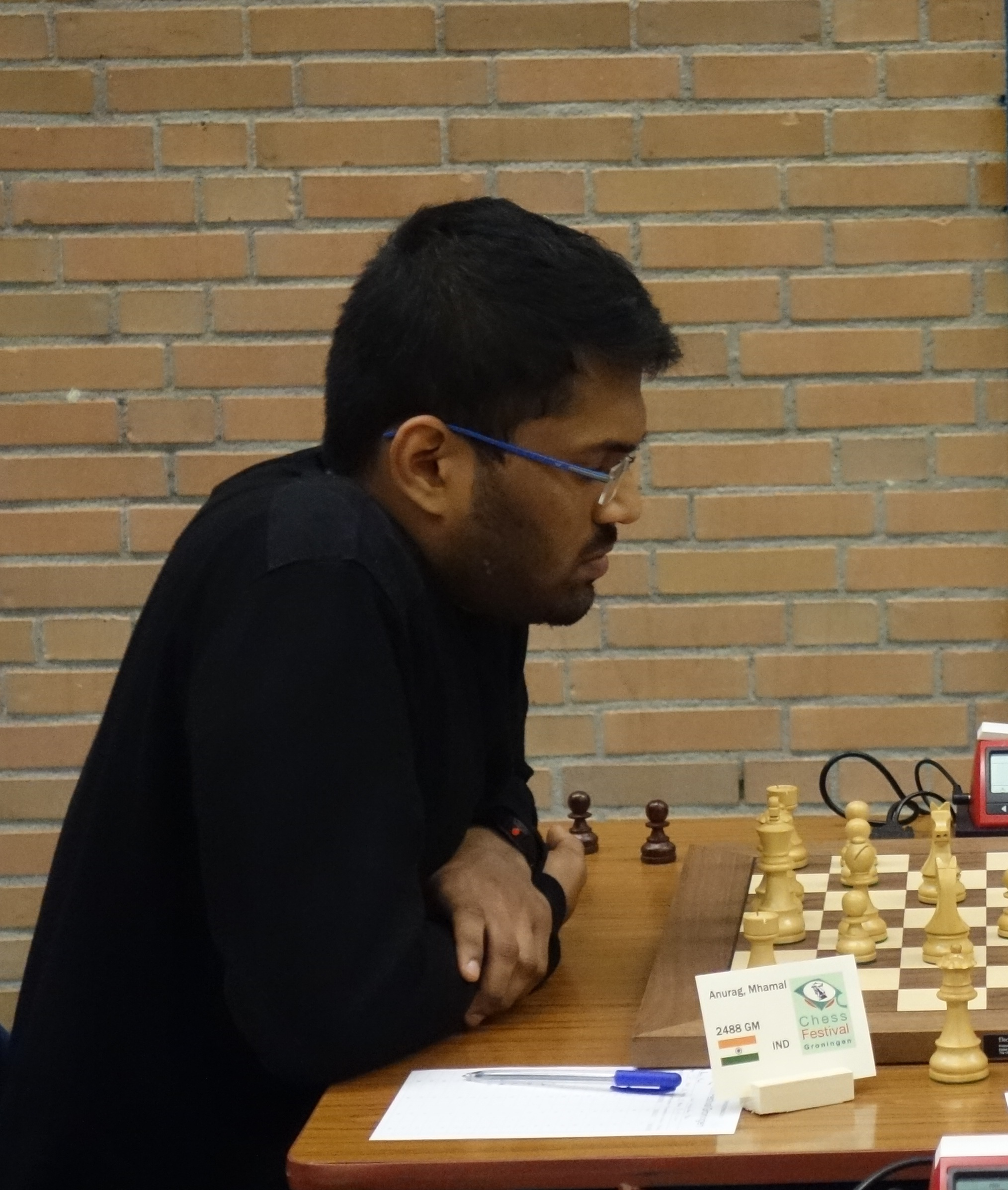
- Mhamal in 2017

Personal information
- Born: 28 April 1995 (age 31) Panaji, India

Chess career
- Country: India
- Title: Grandmaster (2017)
- FIDE rating: 2474 (July 2026)
- Peak rating: 2504 (March 2019)

Anurag Mhamal is an Indian chess grandmaster.

== Career ==
Mhamal learned chess from his father Arvind Mhamal and trained under Akash Thakur.

In 2012, Mhamal became the first IM from the state of Goa after achieving his final IM norm at the International Open at Albena in Bulgaria.

Mhamal won gold at the 2013 Asian Junior Blitz Chess Championship in Sharjah, UAE.

In October 2014, Mhamal defeated grandmaster Robin van Kampen in an upset in the World Junior Chess Championships.

In July 2016, Mhamal got his final GM norm at Czech Open 2016 Pardubice.

In July 2017, Mhamal crossed the 2500 rating mark after defeating Romeo-Sorin Milu in the fifth round of the XXXVII Benasque International Open in Spain, becoming the first GM from the state of Goa and India's 48th Grandmaster.
