= Bodda Pratyusha =

Indian chess woman grandmaster

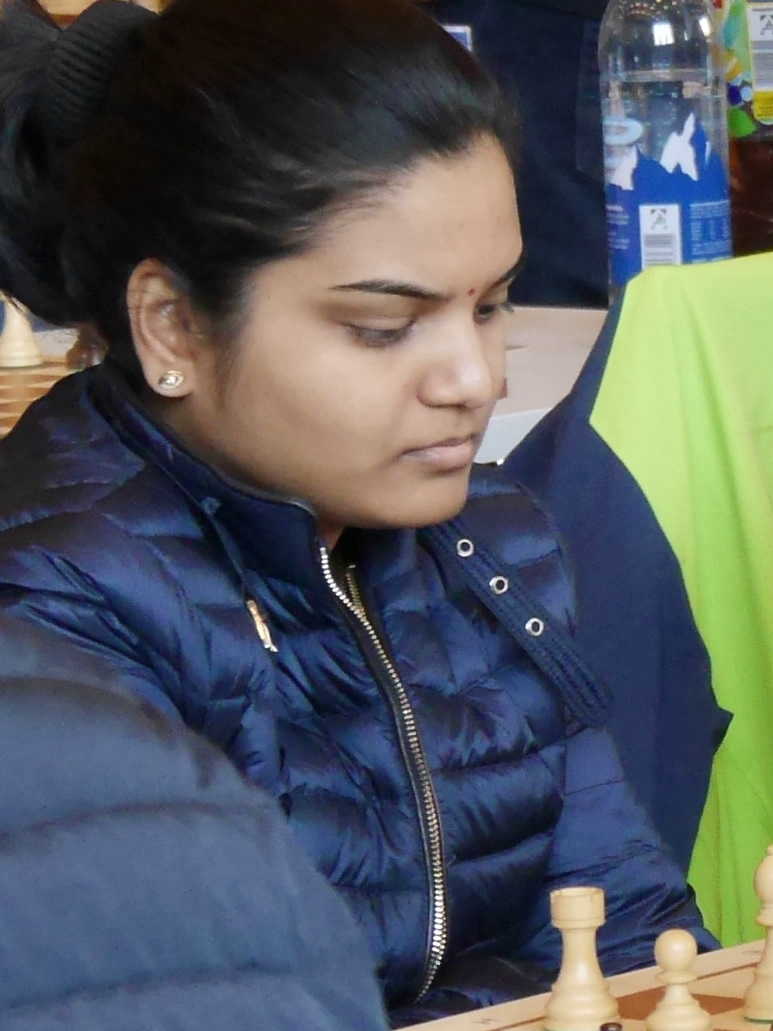
- Bodda Pratyusha in 2018

Personal information
- Born: 11 April 1997 (age 29) Tuni, East Godavari, Andhra Pradesh, India

Chess career
- Country: India
- Title: Woman Grandmaster (2020)
- Peak rating: 2346 (June 2016)

Bodda Pratyusha (born 1997 in Tuni, East Godavari, Andhra Pradesh) is an Indian chess player. In 2012, she was the Indian girls' under-17 champion. In April 2015, she earned the Woman International Master (WIM) title.

In 2020, she became the third Telugu woman to earn the Woman Grandmaster (WGM) title, after Koneru Humpy (2001) and Dronavalli Harika (2004). As of March 2020, her FIDE standard rating is 2328.

== Personal life ==
Pratyusha did her schooling at Sri Prakash Vidya Niketan in Tuni, Andhra Pradesh.
