= Sankalp Gupta =

Indian chess grandmaster (born 2003)

Personal information
- Born: 18 August 2003 (age 22) Nagpur, India

Chess career
- Country: India
- Title: Grandmaster (2022)
- FIDE rating: 2535 (July 2026)
- Peak rating: 2559 (May 2025)

Sankalp Gupta is an Indian chess grandmaster.

== Career ==
In November 2021, he became India's 71st Grandmaster after finishing second in the GM Ask 3 round-robin event in Arandjelovac, Serbia. He managed to earn all three GM norms and surpass the 2500 rating mark in three consecutive tournaments within 24 days, being the fastest Indian player to do so.

In July 2023, he was awarded with the Shiv Chhatrapati Sports Award by the Maharashtra government.

In December 2023, Gupta, along with fellow Indian players Srija Seshadri, Dushyant Sharma, Mounika Akshaya, Arpita Mukherjee, and Vishwa Shah were victims of burglaries whilst playing in the Sunway International Tournament in Sitges, Spain. Gupta stated that he lost his laptop, laptop charger, and airpods.

In December 2023, he won the 20th Bois-Colombes Master Open A 2023 with an undefeated score of 8/9, finishing a full point ahead of the field.

In March 2024, he tied for first place with Sammed Jaykumar Shete, Aakash Sharadchandra Dalvi, and Arghyadip Das in the 1st G H Raisoni Memorial Amravati Rapid Rating Open 2024. He lost the title to Sammed due to tiebreaks.
