= World Rapid and Blitz Team Chess Championships 2026 =

June 2026 FIDE event, Hong Kong

FIDE World Rapid and Blitz Team Championships 2026
Tournament information
- Sport: Chess
- Location: Hong Kong
- Dates: 16–22 June 2026
- Format: Rapid and blitz chess
- Venue: Queen Elizabeth Stadium
- Teams: 48
- Purse: €500,000

Final positions
- Champions: Rapid: Dragon Chilling Blitz: Dragon Chilling

The World Rapid and Blitz Team Chess Championships 2026 was a team chess tournament organized by the International Chess Federation (FIDE) to determine the world team champions in chess played under rapid and blitz time controls. It was held in Hong Kong, from 16 to 22 June 2026.

The rapid championship took place from 17 to 19 June and the blitz championship was played from 20 to 21 June. The prize money was €500,000, of which €310,000 was for the rapid event and €190,000 was for the blitz.

The defending champions were MGD1 in the rapid event and WR Chess Team in the blitz event. Team Dragon Chilling won both the World Rapid Team Championship, and the World Blitz Team Championship.

== Schedule ==
OC	Opening ceremony	TM	Technical Meeting	R	Rapid round	B	Blitz round	CC	Closing ceremony

June	17th Wed	18th Thu	19th Fri	20th Sat	21st Sun
Ceremonies	OC				CC
Meetings	TM				
Rapid	R1-4	R5-8	R9-12		
Blitz				Pools	Knockout

== Prize Fund ==
Event	Winner	2nd	3rd	4th	5th	6th	1st Under 2400	1st Under 2200	Total
Rapid	€110,000	€70,000	€50,000	€30,000	€20,000	€15,000	€10,000	€5,000	€310,000
Blitz	€75,000	€50,000	€30,000	€20,000	€15,000	—N/a	—N/a	—N/a	€190,000

Note: Prize money is per team

== Teams ==
SNo	Team name	Captain	Players	Avg
1	WR Chess	Jan Gustafsson	Magnus Carlsen (2832), Wesley So (2719), Fabiano Caruana (2723), Maxime Vachier-Lagrave (2725), Jan-Krzysztof Duda (2685), Aleksandra Goryachkina (2499), Alexandra Kosteniuk (2452), Wadim Rosenstein (1721), Gombojav Zandanshatar (1400)	2537
2	Hexamind Chess Team	Daria Panarina	Alireza Firouzja (2732), Levon Aronian (2730), Anish Giri (2689), Volodar Murzin (2602), Vidit Gujrathi (2638), Kateryna Lagno (2435), Divya Deshmukh (2416), Murat Omarov (1883), Platon Panarin (1400)	2518
3	Kazchess	Darmen Sadvakasov	Richárd Rapport (2676), Shakhriyar Mamedyarov (2707), Alexander Grischuk (2682), Wang Hao (2667), Kazybek Nogerbek (2504), Aldiyar Ansat (2462), Bibisara Assaubayeva (2439), Meruert Kamalidenova (2368), Kumar Tyulyupov (1892)	2511
4	Dragon Chilling	Ni Hua	Ding Liren (2716), Wei Yi (2726), Yu Yangyi (2660), Lu Shanglei (2601), Bai Jinshi (2560), Ju Wenjun (2481), Lei Tingjie (2494), Wang Zihao (1763), Xie XiaoYang (1400)	2493
5	Endgame.AI	Hans Niemann	Hans Niemann (2673), Leinier Domínguez (2696), Alexey Sarana (2660), Denis Lazavik (2603), Amin Tabatabaei (2593), Zhu Jiner (2479), Nguyễn Anh Dũng (1805)	2486
6	Team MGD1	Srinath Narayanan	Arjun Erigaisi (2741), Nihal Sarin (2689), Abhimanyu Puranik (2535), Pranav V (2564), Leon Luke Mendonca (2544), Harika Dronavalli (2410), Srinath Narayanan (2424), Aryan Abhijeet Shah (1932)	2480
7	Mr Birdie and friends	Awonder Liang	Vladislav Artemiev (2742), Samuel Sevian (2664), Lê Quang Liêm (2636), Awonder Liang (2522), Carissa Yip (2356), Ning Yunlong (1927),	2475
8	Chess United	Tris-Ann Richards	Viswanathan Anand (2729), Jorden van Foreest (2595), José Martínez Alcántara (2636), Faustino Oro (2513), Roman Shogdzhiev (2393), Koneru Humpy (2445), Martha Fierro (2298), Tunde Onakoya (2165), Turgay Seckin Serpil (1855)	2462
9	Barys	Gulmira Dauletova	Dmitry Andreikin (2686), Peter Svidler (2680), Denis Makhnev (2544), Ramazan Zhalmakhanov (2426), Daniyal Sapenov (2418), Ergali Suleimen (2370), Alua Nurman (2291), Xeniya Balabayeva (2295), Ailin Zarkym (1952)	2431
10	Global Ramblers	Denis Bilunov	Maksim Chigaev (2596), Alexei Shirov (2619), Gleb Dudin (2515), Alexander Motylev (2610), Alexander Shabalov (2465), Konstantin Mesropov (2459), Olga Badelka (2318), Anna Zatonskih (2308), Bagrat Verdiyan (1918)	2429
11	Chessgurukul	Aarthie Ramaswamy	R Praggnanandhaa (2663), Pranesh M (2521), Aravindh Chithambaram (2576), Karthikeyan Murali (2530), Adhiban Baskaran (2522), Vaishali Rameshbabu (2387), Rakshitta Ravi (2153), Vishruth B (1822), Varsha Ramesh (1798)	2417
12	Uzbekistan	Rustam Kasimdzhanov	Javokhir Sindarov (2718), Nodirbek Abdusattorov (2703), Nodirbek Yakubboev (2569), Shamsiddin Vokhidov (2527), Mukhiddin Madaminov (2500), Afruza Khamdamova (2358), Umida Omonova (2276), Akjol Rakhmatullaev (1600)	2413
13	Chessnut Nova	Swapnil Dhopade	Raunak Sadhwani (2576), Daniel Dardha (2573), Casper Schoppen (2574), Marc'Andria Maurizzi (2580), Lu Miaoyi (2287), Tim Letoret (1759)	2392
14	Schnappi Krokodil Team	Xu Xiangyu	Xu Xiangyu (2605), Li Di (2432), Dai Changren (2405), Zhao Yuanhe (2352), Guo Qi (2432), Song Yuxin (2378), Chu Weichao (2259), Zhao Shengxin (2164), Mao Yingzhou (1980)	2372
15	Sky Chess	Hulkar Tohirjonova	Shant Sargsyan (2616), Aram Hakobyan (2542), Andrew Hong (2557), Mukhammadzokhid Suyarov (2405), Gulrukhbegim Tokhirjonova (2314), Rakhmonkul Sulaymonov (1786), Askarjon Ismailov (1400)	2370
16	Odlar Yurdu (Azerbaijan)	Rauf Mamedov	Aydin Suleymanli (2556), Rauf Mamedov (2600), Ahmad Ahmadzada (2432), Khazar Babazada (2396), Gunay Mammadzada (2307), Vugar Manafov (2396), Nataliya Buksa (2231), Murad Hashimov (1888)	2363
17	Theme International Trading	Kevin Goh Wei Ming	Nikolas Theodorou (2600), Rinat Jumabayev (2541), Lê Tuấn Minh (2505), Tin Jingyao (2527), Yihan Meng (2447), Teodora Injac (2299), Kevin Goh Wei Ming (2348), Gong Qianyun (2115), Zhang Changjie (1606)	2346
18	Qatar Chess Team	Mohammed Al-Modiahki	Nigel Short (2540), Pavel Tregubov (2501), Victor Bologan (2477), Mohammed Al-Modiahki (2455), Zhu Chen (2260), Hamad Al-Kuwari (1674), Ibrahim Al-Janahi (1746)	2330
19	Shenzhen Qiyu Chess Club	Xue Haowen	Xue Haowen (2442), Wan Yunguo (2495), Zeng Chongsheng (2484), Chen Qi (2444), Lou Yiping (2432), Zuo Junyu (1966), Zhao Yunqing (2008), Zhao Liming (2051), Zhou Tony (1622)	2321
20	Interstellar Club	Gu Xiaobing	Zhao Jun (2596), Xiao Tong (2438), Huang Renjie (2415), Xu Yi (2402), Gu Xiaobing (2130), Zhang Xiao (1987), Xue Kang (1924), Luo Zixuan (1673)	2318
21	Red Pseudodragon	Jamison Edrich Kao	Arkadij Naiditsch (2528), Adelard Bai (2407), Polina Shuvalova (2382), Christian Gian Karlo Arca (2277), Prin Laohawirapap (2298), Jamison Edrich Kao (1978), Wang Puxuan (1844)	2289
22	Mongolia-Aldar	Sumiyaagiin Bilgüün	Sumiyaagiin Bilgüün (2492), Ganzorig Amartuvshin (2405), Sumiya Chinguun (2342), Batkhuyag Munguntuul (2297), Bat-Erdene Mungunzul (2334), Batlut Tsogtbayar (1816)	2281
23	Indonesia	Susanto Megaranto	Utut Adianto (2566), Susanto Megaranto (2515), Novendra Priasmoro (2404), Gilbert Elroy Tarigan (2284), Chelsie Monica Ignesias Sihite (2236), Satria Duta Cahaya (2132), Nayaka Budhidharma (1988), Laysa Latifah (1960), Arjuna Satria Pamungkas (1629)	2272
24	Chess Thulir	Shyam Sundar M.	Ilamparthi A. R. (2369), Srihari L. R. (2399), Shyam Sundar M. (2469), Aswath S (2355), Raahul V. S. (2255), Prishita Gupta (2085), Chelladurai Femil (1921), Sunyuktha C. M. N. (1868), Aadith R. (1710)	2266
25	Duobeniajan Costa Calida Esj	Gabriele Gaviano	José Carlos Ibarra Jeréz (2535), Pepe Cuenca (2485), Marcos Camacho Collados (2365), Maria Florencia Fernandez (2182), Adhara Rodriguez Redondo (2121), Lucas Torres (1920), Rafael Pujante Martinez (1801), Alexandra Aguilera Quiztke (1898), Gabriele Gaviano (1632)	2264
26	Farm - Valera Chess Training	Javier Valera Aznar	Vasyl Ivanchuk (2622), Alvar Alonso Rosell (2503), Daniel Garcia Ramos (2405), Gines Perez Epinin (2088), Rebeca Jimenez Fernandez (2047), Javier Valera Espejo (1869), Javier Valera Aznar (1610)	2256
27	Chongqing Kylin Chess Club	Peng Xiongjian	Liu Yan (2436), Nie Xinyang (2340), Peng Xiongjian (2384), Xiao Yiyi (2244), Liu Bei (2175), Zhang Yinzhe (1913), Liu Hongyan (1981), Ye Peilin (1976), Zhang Hongrui (1400)	2249
28	The MongolZ	Anu Bayar	Dambasuren Batsuren (2436), Uurtsaikh Agibileg (2314), Khuyagtsogt Itgelt (2298), Khishigbat Ulziikhishig (2193), Bayarjargal Bayarmaa (2044), Amartaivan Erkhembayar (1991), Bayar Anu (1927)	2213
29	Caissa Hong Kong Chess Club	Matthew Tan	Alexander Ipatov (2584), Matthew Tan (2423), Tumurbaatar Nomindalai (2179), Emile Boucquet (2139), Brandon Jun Qiao Fang (2002), Wing Ki Kwong (1922), Kyle Chen (1758), Chi Ngo Chan (1595), Hoi Ting Leung (1577)	2208
30	Kidult Chess Academy Hong Kong	Fung Chin Lam	Nikita Petrov (2551), Zaur Tekeyev (2370), Zhao Chenxi (2333), Li Xueyi (2166), Daniel King Wai Lam (1952), Pui Yin Brandon Chan (1806), In Hei Henry Ho (1860), Xia Xuejing (1750), Li Yucheng Robinson (1589)	2205
31	Fearless Knights of Hong Kong China Chess Sch	Ho Cheung Wong	Gao Rui (2455), Zhou Yang-Fan (2454), Zhai Mo (2355), Chun Yung Samuel Lam (1948), Lin Zhaochen (1954), Ho Cheung Wong (1968), Ho Man Tong (1677), Kwan Yat Calix Leung (1643), Nathaniel Sheung Him Wong (1590),	2189
32	May Wind Newbies	Gao Hanxue	Wang Yanbin (2373), Pang Tao (2333), Yan Tianqi (2237), Li Wenxiang (2174), Wang Yukun (2033), Bai Xuhui (1958), Gao Hanxue (1899),	2185
33	The Chess Academy Hong Kong Team B	Manuel Peña Gómez	Manuel Peña Gómez (2387), David Shengelia (2458), Ulysse Bottazzi (2186), Niilo Man Nissinen (2142), Jenny Astrid Chirivi C (2038), Thanneermalai Kannappan (1988), Cheng Justin Hong-Chen (1844), Han Xuqian Ben (1731), Lee Seo Yoon Marissa (1451),	2176
34	Perfect	Timur Shaov	Valery Atlas (2410), Victor Kurochkin (2247), Gennadie Slavin (2151), Ketevan Arakhamia-Grant (2239), Mark Gluhovsky (2135), Mikhail Pleshkov (1856), Elena Nekrasova (1906), Sergei Kurochkin (1783), Valeriu Mindru (1768),	2161
35	The Chess Academy Hong Kong Team A	Andres Felipe Gallego Alcaraz	Jaime Alexander Cuartas (2441), Andres Felipe Gallego Alcaraz (2370), Andres F Escobar Medina (2205), Melissa Castrillon Gomez (2065), Yiheng Li (1942), Krishiv Shah (1763), Jake Chong (1801), Chloe Hailey Lau (1737), Paul Ashton Nguyen (1732),	2137
36	Blue Bulldogs	Tom O'Gorman	Sandeep Sethuraman (2416), Tom O'Gorman (2272), Maximillian Lu (2263), Ashvin Sivakumar (2124), Alice O'Gorman (1960), Yunqi Chen (1774), Ching Yin Law (1573),	2135
37	Malaysia Chess Hub	Mohd Adam Hafiz Jafri Malim	Yeoh Li Tian (2421), Kavin Mohan (2266), Jun Ying Tan (2145), Hafizulhelmi Mas (2198), Ainul Mardhiah Mohd Afif (1796), Mohd Adam Hafiz Jafri Malim (1786), Yi Chen Chow (1878), Eldin Hakimi Mohd Kamal (1783),	2102
38	InstAdapt	He Junchen	Liu Xiangyi (2277), Peng Hongchi (2302), Xu Ziyuan (2225), Jin Ruijun (2168), He Junchen (2031), Zhu Kaizhen (1908), Yu Tianxiang Carlos (1871), Zheng Haoyue (1608), Yi Cao (1400),	2081
39	Qingdao Wanyun Chess Club	Xu Huahua	Xu Huahua (2211), Sun Fanghui (2202), Teng Jiarong (2096), Wu Yinan (2027), Xing Hong (2010), Ding Jun (1942), Liu Ruhao (1882), Guo Jiajun (1684),	2081
40	Wizard Manpower – Pilipinas	Michael Concio	Michael Concio (2391), Alekhine Nouri (2228), Phil Martin Casiguran (2180), Io Aristotle Nikolai Calica (1942), Vincent Ryu Dimayuga (1884), Mhage Gerriahlou Sebastian (1823),	2075
41	Scholastic Anichess HK	Oliver Conran	Aleksandr Shimanov (2584), Olexandr Bortnyk (2609), Pavel Martynov (2258), Marco Da Silva (1751), Chung Kiu Lau (1608), Amartya Shiv Agarwal (1640), Lincoln Or (1524), Jayendra Saloni Anandpara (1522), Ozias Avdian (1587),	2061
42	C.A. Silla Integrant Col-lectius	Jose Antonio Garcia Domingo	Ruben Domingo Nunez (2439), Alejandro Yuste Valenzuela (2148), Jose Antonio Garcia Domingo (2169), Ruben Gonzalvez Tamarit (2065), Paula Suarez Gomez (1802), Pedro Larrosa Sanchez (1621), Pablo Arres Larrosa (1625),	2041
43	Quadcore+	Ja Gireman	Rathanvel V S (2316), Ja Gireman (2164), Rajaa Karthik (2219), Genivan Genkeswaran (1975), Wang Ip Boris Chan (1937), Anastasiia Khan (1827), Kaseh Irsya Dania Mohd Nurul Izani (1691), Liu Tian Yi (1521),	2032
44	Davao Chess Eagles	Christopher Yap	Kim Steven Yap (2289), Randy Segarra (2150), Aglipay Oberio (2078), Winston Joseph R Silva (1966), Jose Dionisio Jr. Guevarra (1997), Mary Israel Palero (1839), Christopher Yap (1750), Florence Faith Guevarra (1816), Glenn Sayson Paclar (1400),	2028
45	Street Chess Canberra	Miles Patterson	Harry Press (2130), Frederick Litchfield (2107), Heather S Richards (2097), Ryan Lane (1972), Chao Xin Cheng (1940), Miles Patterson (1880), Matt Radisich (1758), Lee Forace (1683),	2021
46	Chess In Shanghai	Ingmar Adriano Potenza	Felipe Hurtado (2102), Bai Xue (2056), Arnaud Plessis (2030), Rui Zhang (1947), Yang Yijing (2019), Alexander Karaivanov (1897), Oleksandr Prach (1893), Ge William (1776), Yang Xiaohang (1707),	2009
47	Beijing Yijia Chess Club	Liu Zhaoqi	Liu Zhaoqi (2265), Changda Gong (2163), Xiao Junyuan (2079), Zhou Yuxu (1745), Wen Yipeng (1808), Jialade Wayile (1896), Qian Linda (Zhiling) (1678), Wang Xinran (1539), Wang Shenglin (1400),	1982
48	Kindness On Board Infinite Team	Chen Harlin	Bao Qilin (2404), Chen Jonathan (2170), Zhang Xiaopeng (2260), Fang Jack Junrui (1809), Chen Jocelyn (1784), Ethan Chou Dyget (1400), Zhen Andrew (1400), Lu Jason (1400),	1971

== Results ==
=== Rapid ===
Final Standings
Rank	Team	Matches	Points	TB1	TB2
1	Dragon Chilling	12	18	647.5	46
2	Team MGD1	12	18	632	46
3	Hexamind Chess Team	12	18	611.5	45
4	Mr Birdie and Friends	12	17	584.5	44.5
5	Chessgurukul	12	17	561.5	40.5
6	Endgame.AI	12	16	544.5	43.5
7	Kazchess	12	15	567	41
8	Uzbekistan	12	15	512	43
9	Barys	12	14	475	37.5
10	Interstellar Club	12	14	474.5	40.5
Total entries: 48 teams

=== Blitz ===
==== Pool A ====
Rank	Team	1	2	3	4	5	6	7	8	9	10	11	12	Points	TB1	TB2
1	WR Chess		2	2	1	2	2	2	2	2	2	2	2	21	53	205
2	Chess United	0		2	2	2	2	1	2	2	2	2	2	19	46.5	175
3	Barys	0	0		2	2	2	2	2	2	2	2	2	18	49.5	148
4	Schnappi Krokodil Team	1	0	0		2	2	2	2	2	2	2	2	17	45	135
5	Theme International Trading	0	0	0	0		2	0	2	2	2	2	2	12	40	72
6	Fearless Knights of Hong Kong China Chess Sch	0	0	0	0	0		0	2	2	2	2	2	10	26	52
7	Chongqing Kylin Chess Club	0	1	0	0	2	2		0	2	0	2	0	9	33	81
8	Duobeniajan Costa Calida Esj	0	0	0	0	0	0	2		1	2	2	2	9	29.5	45
9	The Chess Academy Hong Kong Team B	0	0	0	0	0	0	0	1		2	2	2	7	22.5	29
10	InstAdapt	0	0	0	0	0	0	2	0	0		2	2	6	24	26
11	Kindness On Board Infinite Team	0	0	0	0	0	0	0	0	0	0		2	2	16.5	4
12	C.A. Silla Integrant Col-lectius	0	0	0	0	0	0	2	0	0	0	0		2	10.5	18

==== Pool B ====
Rank	Team	1	2	3	4	5	6	7	8	9	10	11	12	Points	TB1	TB2
1	Endgame.AI		1	2	2	2	2	2	2	2	2	2	2	21	49.5	202
2	Dragon Chilling	1		2	2	2	1	2	2	2	2	2	2	20	44	191
3	Chessgurukul	0	0		2	1	2	2	2	2	2	2	2	17	50	135
4	Indonesia	0	0	0		1	2	2	2	2	2	2	2	15	39.5	105
5	Mongolia-Aldar	0	0	1	1		0	1	2	2	2	2	2	13	44	89
6	May Wind Newbies	0	1	0	0	2		1	0	2	2	2	2	12	33.5	81
7	Global Ramblers	0	0	0	0	1	1		1	2	2	2	2	11	35.5	60
8	Chess Thulir	0	0	0	0	0	2	1		2	2	2	2	11	33.5	59
9	Street Chess Canberra	0	0	0	0	0	0	0	0		2	1	2	5	17	11
10	Scholastic Anichess HK	0	0	0	0	0	0	0	0	0		2	1	3	19.5	7
11	Davao Chess Eagles	0	0	0	0	0	0	0	0	1	0		2	3	17.5	7
12	Perfect	0	0	0	0	0	0	0	0	0	1	0		1	12.5	3

==== Pool C ====
Rank	Team	1	2	3	4	5	6	7	8	9	10	11	12	Points	TB1	TB2
1	Hexamind Chess Team		1	2	2	2	2	2	2	2	2	2	2	21	50	203
2	Uzbekistan	1		1	2	1	2	2	2	2	2	2	2	19	51.5	173
3	Team MGD1	0	1		2	0	2	2	2	2	2	2	2	17	48	139
4	Sky Chess	0	0	0		2	2	2	2	2	2	2	2	16	42.5	118
5	Red Pseudodragon	0	1	2	0		0	2	2	2	2	2	2	15	39	117
6	Shenzhen Qiyu Chess Club	0	0	0	0	2		1	1	2	2	2	2	12	34.5	77
7	Kidult Chess Academy Hong Kong	0	0	0	0	0	1		2	2	2	2	2	11	34	54
8	Caissa Hong Kong Chess Club	0	0	0	0	0	1	0		1	0	2	2	6	22.5	27
9	Quadcore+	0	0	0	0	0	0	0	1		0	2	2	5	23.5	16
10	The Chess Academy Hong Kong Team A	0	0	0	0	0	0	0	2	2		0	1	5	21	23
11	Malaysia Chess Hub	0	0	0	0	0	0	0	0	0	2		2	4	19.5	12
12	Chess In Shanghai	0	0	0	0	0	0	0	0	0	1	0		1	10	5

==== Pool D ====
Rank	Team	1	2	3	4	5	6	7	8	9	10	11	12	Points	TB1	TB2
1	Mr Birdie and friends		2	2	2	2	2	2	2	2	2	2	2	22	52.5	220
2	Kazchess	0		2	0	2	2	2	2	2	2	2	2	18	46.5	156
3	Odlar Yurdu (Azerbaijan)	0	0		2	1	2	0	2	2	2	2	2	15	39.5	116
4	Interstellar Club	0	2	0		2	0	0	2	2	2	2	2	14	41	112
5	Chessnut Nova	0	0	1	0		1	2	2	2	2	2	2	14	39.5	100
6	Farm - Valera Chess Training	0	0	0	2	1		2	2	1	2	1	2	13	33	103
7	The MongolZ	0	0	2	2	0	0		2	2	2	0	2	12	33	96
8	PKU-Alpha2Fund Chess Team	0	0	0	0	0	0	0		1	2	2	2	7	29	28
9	Blue Bulldogs	0	0	0	0	0	1	0	1		0	2	2	6	25	30
10	Wizard Manpower – Pilipinas	0	0	0	0	0	0	0	0	2		2	2	6	25	22
11	Qatar Chess Team	0	0	0	0	0	1	2	0	0	0		2	5	20.5	37
12	Beijing Yijia Chess Club	0	0	0	0	0	0	0	0	0	0	0		0	11.5	0

==== Knockout stage ====
Round 1			Quarterfinals		Semifinals		Final
A1	WR Chess	4
B4	Indonesia	0	WR Chess	1
C2	Uzbekistan	3	Uzbekistan	3
D3	Odlar Yurdu	1			Uzbekistan	2
D1	Mr Birdie and friends	4			Dragon Chilling	4
C4	Sky Chess	0	Mr Birdie and friends	2
B2	Dragon Chilling	3	Dragon Chilling	4
A3	Barys	1					Dragon Chilling	4
A4	Schnappi Krokodil Team	0					Endgame.AI	0
B1	Endgame.AI	4	Endgame.AI	3
C3	Team MGD1	4	Team MGD1	1
D2	Kazchess	0			Endgame.AI	4	3rd Place
D4	Interstellar Club	0			Hexamind Chess Team	2
C1	Hexamind Chess Team	4	Hexamind Chess Team	4			Uzbekistan	4
B3	Chessgurukul	4	Chessgurukul	0			Hexamind Chess Team	2
A2	Chess United	0
