= Biel Chess Festival =

Swiss chess tournament (1968-pres.)

The Biel International Chess Festival is an annual chess tournament that takes place in Biel/Bienne, Switzerland. It consists of two events, the Grandmaster Tournament, held with the round-robin system, and the Master Open Tournament (MTO), held with the Swiss system. The Grandmaster Tournament has taken place since 1977. The city of Biel hosted three Interzonal Tournaments, in 1976, 1985 and 1993.

== Winners ==
#	Year	Grandmaster Tournament	Master Open Tournament
1	1968		Edwin Bhend (Switzerland)
2	1969		Jan Timman (Netherlands)
3	1970		Predrag Ostojic (Yugoslavia)
4	1971		Stanimir Nikolic (Yugoslavia)
5	1972		Milan Vukic (Yugoslavia)
6	1973		Milan Vukic (Yugoslavia); János Flesch (Hungary)
7	1974		Bela Soos (Romania)
8	1975		Mišo Cebalo (Yugoslavia); John Pigott (England); David Parr (Australia)
9	1976	Bent Larsen (Denmark) (Interzonal)	Dragutin Sahovic (Yugoslavia); Radovan Govedarica (Yugoslavia)
10	1977	Tony Miles (England)	Miguel Quinteros (Argentina)
11	1978		Charles Partos (Switzerland)
12	1979	Viktor Korchnoi (Switzerland)	Yehuda Gruenfeld (Israel); Jean Hébert (Canada)
13	1980	Yehuda Gruenfeld (Israel)	Israel Zilber (United States); Josip Rukavina (Yugoslavia); Beat Züger (Switzerland); Peter Scheeren (Netherlands)
14	1981	Eric Lobron (West Germany); Vlastimil Hort (Czechoslovakia)	Nathan Birnboim (Israel); Laszlo Karsa (Hungary); Ron Henley (United States); Eduard Meduna (Czechoslovakia)
15	1982	John Nunn (England); Florin Gheorghiu (Romania)	Ivan Nemet (Yugoslavia)
16	1983	Tony Miles (England); John Nunn (England)	Jaan Eslon (Sweden)
17	1984	Vlastimil Hort (West Germany); Robert Hübner (West Germany)	Carlos Garcia-Palermo (Argentina)
18	1985	Rafael Vaganian (Soviet Union) (Interzonal)	Ian Rogers (Australia); Alon Greenfeld (Israel)
19	1986	Lev Polugaevsky (Soviet Union); Eric Lobron (West Germany)	Daniel Cámpora (Argentina)
20	1987	Boris Gulko (United States)	Lev Gutman (Israel)
21	1988	Ivan Sokolov (Yugoslavia); Boris Gulko (United States)	Gennadi Kuzmin (Soviet Union)
22	1989	Vassily Ivanchuk (Soviet Union)	Matthias Wahls (West Germany)
23	1990	Anatoly Karpov (Soviet Union)	Viktor Gavrikov (Soviet Union)
24	1991	Alexei Shirov (Latvia)	Zurab Sturua (Soviet Union)
25	1992	Anatoly Karpov (Russia)	Alexander Shabalov (Latvia)
26	1993	Boris Gelfand (Belarus) (Interzonal)	Vadim Milov (Israel)
27	1994	Viktor Gavrikov (Switzerland)	Utut Adianto (Indonesia)
28	1995	Alexey Dreev (Russia)	Igor Glek (Germany)
29	1996	Anatoly Karpov (Russia)	Zurab Sturua (Georgia)
30	1997	Viswanathan Anand (India)	Ildar Ibragimov (Russia)
31	1998	Mladen Palac (Croatia)	Milos Pavlovic (Yugoslavia)
32	1999	Jeroen Piket (Netherlands)	Vadim Milov (Switzerland)
33	2000	Peter Svidler (Russia)	Boris Avrukh (Israel)
34	2001	Viktor Korchnoi (Switzerland)	Boris Avrukh (Israel)
35	2002	Ilya Smirin (Israel)	Milos Pavlovic (Yugoslavia)
36	2003	Alexander Morozevich (Russia)	Mikhail Ulibin (Russia)
37	2004	Alexander Morozevich (Russia)	Christian Bauer (France)
38	2005	Boris Gelfand (Israel); Andrei Volokitin (Ukraine)	Mikhail Kobalia (Russia)
39	2006	Alexander Morozevich (Russia)	Bartosz Soćko (Poland)
40	2007	Magnus Carlsen (Norway)	Mikhail Ulibin (Russia)
41	2008	Evgeny Alekseev (Russia)	Vladimir Belov (Russia)
42	2009	Maxime Vachier-Lagrave (France)	Boris Grachev (Russia)
43	2010	Fabiano Caruana (Italy)	Alexander Riazantsev (Russia)
44	2011	Magnus Carlsen (Norway)	Ni Hua (China)
45	2012	Wang Hao (China)	Igor Kurnosov (Russia)
46	2013	Maxime Vachier-Lagrave (France)	Pentala Harikrishna (India)
47	2014	Maxime Vachier-Lagrave (France)	Baskaran Adhiban (India)
48	2015	Maxime Vachier-Lagrave (France)	Emil Sutovsky (Israel)
49	2016 (Note: In 2016 a match between Maxime Vachier-Lagrave and Peter Svidler took place instead of the traditional round-robin Grandmaster Tournament.)	Maxime Vachier-Lagrave (France)	Samuel Shankland (United States)
50	2017	Hou Yifan (China)	Mateusz Bartel (Poland)
51	2018	Shakhriyar Mamedyarov (Azerbaijan)	Suri Vaibhav (India)
52	2019	Vidit Gujrathi (India)	Amin Tabatabaei (IRI)
53	2020	Radosław Wojtaszek (Poland)	Christian Bauer (France)
54	2021	Gata Kamsky (United States)	Salem Saleh (United Arab Emirates)
55	2022	Lê Quang Liêm (Vietnam)	Mahammad Muradli (Azerbaijan)
56	2023	Lê Quang Liêm (Vietnam)	Bu Xiangzhi (China)
57	2024	Lê Quang Liêm (Vietnam)	Rinat Jumabayev (Kazakhstan)
58	2025	Vladimir Fedoseev (Slovenia)	Karthikeyan Murali (India)
59	2026	Levon Aronian (United States)	Christian Gloeckler (Germany)

== Event results ==
=== 2023 ===
The 2023 event invited 8 players to play a triathlon of time control formats: single round-robin in 15+5 rapid time controls, single round-robin in classical time controls with colors reversed from Rapid, and double round-robin in 3+2 blitz time controls. Points are given each game according to time controls: 4-1½-0 for classical, 2-1-0 for rapid, and 1-½-0 for blitz. This event was included for the 2023 FIDE Circuit, but only the classical section results were used for circuit points calculation.

2023 Biel Masters Triathlon, 14-25 July, Biel/Bienne, Switzerland
	Player	Rapid	Blitz	Classical	Total
1	Lê Quang Liêm (Vietnam)	5	8½	19	32½
2	Vincent Keymer (Germany)	10	5	16½	31½
3	David Navara (Czech Republic)	10	7½	13	30½
4	Arjun Erigaisi (India)	5	10½	10	25½
5	Yu Yangyi (China)	9	7½	7½	24
6	Jules Moussard (France)	6	7	10½	23½
7	Bassem Amin (Egypt)	8	3½	8½	20
8	Bogdan-Daniel Deac (Romania)	3	6½	9	18½

2023 Biel Masters Triathlon – Rapid, 16 July, Biel/Bienne, Switzerland
	Player	Rating	1	2	3	4	5	6	7	8	Points
T-1	Vincent Keymer (Germany)	2617		2	1	1	2	2	1	1	10
T-1	David Navara (Czech Republic)	2689	0		1	2	1	2	2	2	10
3	Yu Yangyi (China)	2734	1	1		1	2	2	0	2	9
4	Bassem Amin (Egypt)	2588	1	0	1		1	2	2	1	8
5	Jules Moussard (France)	2605	0	1	0	1		0	2	2	6
T-6	Arjun Erigaisi (India)	2714	0	0	0	0	2		2	1	5
T-6	Lê Quang Liêm (Vietnam)	2661	1	0	2	0	0	0		2	5
8	Bogdan-Daniel Deac (Romania)	2634	1	0	0	1	0	1	0		3

2023 Biel Masters Triathlon – Classical, 18–26 July, Biel/Bienne, Switzerland
	Player	Rating	1	2	3	4	5	6	7	8	Points	Circuit
1	Lê Quang Liêm (Vietnam)	2728		0	1½	1½	4	4	4	4	19	19.91
2	Vincent Keymer (Germany)	2690	4		1½	1½	0	1½	4	4	16½	15.93
3	David Navara (Czech Republic)	2689	1½	1½		1½	1½	1½	4	1½	13	13.94
4	Jules Moussard (France)	2654	1½	1½	1½		1½	1½	1½	1½	10½	11.95
5	Arjun Erigaisi (India)	2710	0	4	1½	1½		1½	0	1½	10	–
6	Bogdan-Daniel Deac (Romania)	2693	0	1½	1½	1½	1½		1½	1½	9	–
7	Bassem Amin (Egypt)	2694	0	0	0	1½	4	1½		1½	8½	–
8	Yu Yangyi (China)	2735	0	0	1½	1½	1½	1½	1½		7½	–

2023 Biel Masters Triathlon – Blitz, 22 July, Biel/Bienne, Switzerland
	Player	Rating	1	2	3	4	5	6	7	8	Points
1	Arjun Erigaisi (India)	2710		1 1	1 ½	½ 1	1 0	½ 1	½ 1	½ 1	10½
2	Lê Quang Liêm (Vietnam)	2643	0 0		1 0	1 ½	1 0	1 ½	½ 1	1 1	8½
T-3	David Navara (Czech Republic)	2675	0 ½	0 1		1 0	½ 1	0 1	0 ½	1 1	7½
T-3	Yu Yangyi (China)	2770	½ 0	0 ½	0 1		½ ½	1 ½	1 ½	1 ½	7½
5	Jules Moussard (France)	2626	0 1	0 1	½ 0	½ ½		½ 0	½ ½	1 1	7
6	Bogdan-Daniel Deac (Romania)	2644	½ 0	0 ½	1 0	0 ½	½ 1		1 0	1 ½	6½
7	Vincent Keymer (Germany)	2669	½ 0	½ 0	1 ½	0 ½	½ ½	0 1		0 0	5
8	Bassem Amin (Egypt)	2670	½ 0	0 0	0 0	0 ½	0 0	0 ½	1 1		3½

Master Tournament Open

2023 Biel Masters Tournament, 17–27 July, Biel/Bienne, Switzerland
	Player	Rating	Points	TB1	TB2	Circuit
1	Bu Xiangzhi (China)	2676	8/10	60	503	10.38
2	Aryan Chopra (India)	2626	7½/10	58½	504	8.30
3	Liu Yan (China)	2542	7/10	57½	490	5.38
4	Peng Xiongjian (China)	2489	7/10	56½	489	4.86
5	Nguyễn Ngọc Trường Sơn (Vietnam)	2645	7/10	56½	488	4.34
6	Nico Chasin (United States)	2455	7/10	55½	484	3.83
7	Rathanvel V S (India)	2463	7/10	54½	469	3.31
8	Read Samadov (Azerbaijan)	2482	7/10	53½	477½	2.79
9	Robert Shlyakhtenko (United States)	2401	7/10	48	456	1.75
10	Georg Seul (Germany)	2376	7/10	46½	449	1.75
Total entries: 98 players

=== 2024 ===
The 2024 event had 2 invitational sections, Masters and Challengers, with 6 players each. Each section played the same triathlon format from the previous event with the same point distribution, except that after all three phases are played, top 3 in total points, along with 4th place if they are within 12 points from first place, will continue play with a second classical round-robin.

2024 Biel Masters Triathlon, 14-25 July, Biel/Bienne, Switzerland
	Player	Rapid	Classical 1	Blitz	Classical 2	Total
1	Lê Quang Liêm (Vietnam)	5	12½	6½	7	31
2	Haik M. Martirosyan (Armenia)	7	7½	6½	4½	25½
3	R Praggnanandhaa (India)	5	7	7	5½	24½
4	Abhimanyu Mishra (United States)	4	12½	2½	3	22
5	Vincent Keymer (Germany)	5	8½	2		15½
6	Sam Shankland (United States)	4	3	5½		12½

2024 Biel Masters Triathlon – Rapid, 14 July, Biel/Bienne, Switzerland
	Player	Rating	1	2	3	4	5	6	Points
1	Haik M. Martirosyan (Armenia)	2599		2	1	1	1	2	7
T-2	Vincent Keymer (Germany)	2645	0		0	2	2	1	5
T-2	R Praggnanandhaa (India)	2709	1	2		1	1	0	5
T-2	Lê Quang Liêm (Vietnam)	2659	1	0	1		1	2	5
T-5	Abhimanyu Mishra (United States)	2604	1	0	1	1		1	4
T-5	Sam Shankland (United States)	2622	0	1	2	0	1		4

2024 Biel Masters Triathlon – Classical, 16–20 July, Biel/Bienne, Switzerland
	Player	Rating	1	2	3	4	5	6	Points
T-1	Abhimanyu Mishra (United States)	2604		1½	1½	1½	4	4	12½
T-1	Lê Quang Liêm (Vietnam)	2731	1½		4	1½	1½	4	12½
3	Vincent Keymer (Germany)	2721	1½	0		1½	4	1½	8½
4	Haik M. Martirosyan (Armenia)	2661	1½	1½	1½		1½	1½	7½
5	R Praggnanandhaa (India)	2757	0	1½	0	1½		4	7
6	Sam Shankland (United States)	2683	0	0	1½	1½	0		3

2024 Biel Masters Triathlon – Blitz, 21 July, Biel/Bienne, Switzerland
	Player	Rating	1	2	3	4	5	6	Points
1	R Praggnanandhaa (India)	2680		1 ½	½ 0	1 0	1 1	1 1	7
T-2	Lê Quang Liêm (Vietnam)	2700	0 ½		½ ½	1 ½	½ 1	1 1	6½
T-2	Haik M. Martirosyan (Armenia)	2716	½ 1	½ ½		0 1	1 ½	1 ½	6½
4	Sam Shankland (United States)	2648	0 1	0 ½	1 0		½ ½	1 1	5½
5	Abhimanyu Mishra (United States)	2449	0 0	½ 0	0 ½	½ ½		½ 0	2½
6	Vincent Keymer (Germany)	2607	0 0	0 0	0 ½	0 0	½ 1		2

2024 Biel Masters Triathlon – Final, 23–25 July, Biel/Bienne, Switzerland
	Player	Rating	1	2	3	4	Points
1	Lê Quang Liêm (Vietnam)	2731		4	1½	1½	7
2	R Praggnanandhaa (India)	2757	0		1½	4	5½
3	Haik M. Martirosyan (Armenia)	2661	1½	1½		1½	4½
4	Abhimanyu Mishra (United States)	2604	1½	0	1½		3

2024 Biel Challengers Triathlon, 14-25 July, Biel/Bienne, Switzerland
	Player	Rapid	Classical 1	Blitz	Classical 2	Total
1	Salem Saleh (United Arab Emirates)	6	15	9	5½	35½
2	Alexander Donchenko (Germany)	7	11	5	5½	28½
3	R Vaishali (India)	5	15	2½	0	22½
4	Jonas Buhl Bjerre (Denmark)	5	9½	3		17½
5	Marc'Andria Maurizzi (France)	4	3	5½		12½
6	Ihor Samunenkov (Ukraine)	3	1½	5		9½

2024 Biel Challengers Triathlon – Rapid, 14 July, Biel/Bienne, Switzerland
	Player	Rating	1	2	3	4	5	6	Points
1	Alexander Donchenko (Germany)	2574		2	0	2	2	1	7
2	Salem Saleh (United Arab Emirates)	2659	0		2	2	0	2	6
T-3	Jonas Buhl Bjerre (Denmark)	2523	2	0		1	0	2	5
T-3	R Vaishali (India)	2359	0	0	1		2	2	5
5	Marc'Andria Maurizzi (France)	2445	0	2	2	0		0	4
6	Ihor Samunenkov (Ukraine)	2428	1	0	0	0	2		3

2024 Biel Challengers Triathlon – Classical, 16–20 July, Biel/Bienne, Switzerland
	Player	Rating	1	2	3	4	5	6	Points
T-1	Salem Saleh (United Arab Emirates)	2638		1½	1½	4	4	4	15
T-1	R Vaishali (India)	2488	1½		4	4	1½	4	15
3	Alexander Donchenko (Germany)	2644	1½	0		1½	4	4	11
4	Jonas Buhl Bjerre (Denmark)	2653	0	0	1½		4	4	9½
5	Marc'Andria Maurizzi (France)	2620	0	1½	0	0		1½	3
6	Ihor Samunenkov (Ukraine)	2535	0	0	0	0	1½		1½

2024 Biel Challengers Triathlon – Blitz, 21 July, Biel/Bienne, Switzerland
	Player	Rating	1	2	3	4	5	6	Points
1	Salem Saleh (United Arab Emirates)	2654		1 1	1 ½	1 ½	1 1	1 1	9
2	Marc'Andria Maurizzi (France)	2443	0 0		1 ½	1 0	1 1	1 0	5½
T-3	Alexander Donchenko (Germany)	2569	0 ½	0 ½		1 ½	0 1	1 ½	5
T-3	Ihor Samunenkov (Ukraine)	2471	0 ½	0 1	0 ½		0 1	1 1	5
5	Jonas Buhl Bjerre (Denmark)	2519	0 0	0 0	1 0	1 0		0 1	3
6	R Vaishali (India)	2366	0 0	0 1	0 ½	0 0	1 0		2½

2024 Biel Challengers Triathlon – Final, 23–25 July, Biel/Bienne, Switzerland
	Player	Rating	1	2	3	Points
T-1	Salem Saleh (United Arab Emirates)	2638		1½	4	5½
T-1	Alexander Donchenko (Germany)	2633	1½		4	5½
3	R Vaishali (India)	2488	0	0		0

Master Tournament Open

2024 Biel Masters Tournament, 15–25 July, Biel/Bienne, Switzerland
	Player	Rating	Points	SB	Circuit
1	Rinat Jumabayev (Kazakhstan)	2565	7½/10	47	8.32
2	Leon Luke Mendonca (India)	2615	7½/10	45	7.38
3	Ayush Sharma (India)	2342	7½/10	44¾	6.91
4	Mukhiddin Madaminov (Uzbekistan)	2512	7½/10	44¼	6.45
5	Krishnan Sasikiran (India)	2581	7/10	42½	3.44
6	Aryan Chopra (India)	2632	7/10	42	2.97
7	Xue Haowen (China)	2452	7/10	41½	2.50
8	Aldiyar Ansat (Kazakhstan)	2458	7/10	40	2.03
9	Arseniy Nesterov (FIDE)	2602	7/10	39½	1.09
10	Sugaryn Gan-Erdene (Mongolia)	2407	7/10	38½	1.09
Total entries: 128 players

=== 2025 ===
The 2025 event had 2 invitational sections, Masters and Challengers, with 6 players each. Each section played the same triathlon format from the previous event with the same point distribution. After all three phases are played, top 3 in total points, along with 4th place if they are within 12 points from first place, will continue play with a second classical round-robin. In case of a tie, the ranking in the ACCENTUS Chess960 decides upon the final ranking of the Triathlon and the corresponding prizes.

2025 Biel Masters Triathlon, 13-24 July, Biel/Bienne, Switzerland
	Player	Rapid	Classical 1	Blitz	Classical 2	Total	ACC-960 (Note: In case of a tie, the ranking in the ACCENTUS Chess960 decides upon the final ranking of the Triathlon and the corresponding prizes.)
1	Vladimir Fedoseev (Slovenia)	7	8½	7½	5½	28½	4
2	Aravindh Chithambaram (India)	7	8½	6	7	28½	2½
3	Salem Saleh (United Arab Emirates)	2	15	6	1½	24½	
4	Volodar Murzin (FIDE)	5	7½	4	7	23½	
5	Radoslaw Wojtaszek (Poland)	6	6	4		16	
6	Frederik Svane (Germany)	3	4½	2½		10	

2025 Biel Masters Triathlon – Rapid, 13 July, Biel/Bienne, Switzerland
	Player	Rating	1	2	3	4	5	6	Points
T-1	Aravindh Chithambaram (India)	2576		1	1	1	2	2	7
T-1	Vladimir Fedoseev (Slovenia)	2740	1		0	2	2	2	7
3	Radoslaw Wojtaszek (Poland)	2657	1	2		1	0	2	6
4	Volodar Murzin (FIDE)	2644	1	0	1		2	1	5
5	Frederik Svane (Germany)	2487	0	0	2	0		1	3
6	Salem Saleh (United Arab Emirates)	2637	0	0	0	1	1		2

2025 Biel Masters Triathlon – Classical, 15–19 July, Biel/Bienne, Switzerland
	Player	Rating	1	2	3	4	5	6	Points
1	Salem Saleh (United Arab Emirates)	2627		4	4	1½	1½	4	15
T-2	Aravindh Chithambaram (India)	2724	0		1½	1½	1½	4	8½
T-2	Vladimir Fedoseev (Slovenia)	2739	0	1½		1½	4	1½	8½
4	Volodar Murzin (FIDE)	2671	1½	1½	1½		1½	1½	7½
5	Radoslaw Wojtaszek (Poland)	2651	1½	1½	0	1½		1½	6
6	Frederik Svane (Germany)	2659	0	0	1½	1½	1½		4½

2025 Biel Masters Triathlon – Blitz, 20 July, Biel/Bienne, Switzerland
	Player	Rating	1	2	3	4	5	6	Points
1	Vladimir Fedoseev (Slovenia)	2746		1 0	0 1	1 1	½ 1	1 1	7½
T-2	Salem Saleh (United Arab Emirates)	2644	0 1		1 1	0 1	1 0	0 1	6
T-2	Aravindh Chithambaram (India)	2611	1 0	0 0		½ 1	1 1	½ 1	6
T-4	Volodar Murzin (FIDE)	2669	0 0	1 0	½ 0		½ 1	1 0	4
T-4	Radoslaw Wojtaszek (Poland)	2610	½ 0	0 1	0 0	½ 0		1 1	4
6	Frederik Svane (Germany)	2553	0 0	1 0	½ 0	0 1	0 0		2½

2025 Biel Masters Triathlon – Final, 22–24 July, Biel/Bienne, Switzerland
	Player	Rating	1	2	3	4	Points
T-1	Aravindh Chithambaram (India)	2724		1½	1½	4	7
T-1	Volodar Murzin (FIDE)	2671	1½		4	1½	7
3	Vladimir Fedoseev (Slovenia)	2739	1½	0		4	5½
4	Salem Saleh (United Arab Emirates)	2627	0	1½	0		1½

2025 Biel Challengers Triathlon, 13-24 July, Biel/Bienne, Switzerland
	Player	Rapid	Classical 1	Blitz	Classical 2	Total
1	Nikolas Theodorou (Greece)	8	12½	6	7	33½
2	Aram Hakobyan (Armenia)	7	10	7	4½	28½
3	Rinat Jumabayev (Kazakhstan)	4	8½	3	4½	20
4	David Navara (Czechia)	2	8½	5	3	18½
5	Ma Qun (China)	5	6	4		15
6	Daniel Dardha (Belgium)	4	4½	5		13½

2025 Biel Challengers Triathlon – Rapid, 13 July, Biel/Bienne, Switzerland
	Player	Rating	1	2	3	4	5	6	Points
1	Nikolas Theodorou (Greece)	2559		1	1	2	2	2	8
2	Aram Hakobyan (Armenia)	2535	1		1	1	2	2	7
3	Ma Qun (China)	2617	1	1		1	1	1	5
T-4	Rinat Jumabayev (Kazakhstan)	2546	0	1	1		0	2	4
T-4	Daniel Dardha (Belgium)	2580	0	0	1	2		1	4
6	David Navara (Czechia)	2621	0	0	1	0	1		2

2025 Biel Challengers Triathlon – Classical, 15–19 July, Biel/Bienne, Switzerland
	Player	Rating	1	2	3	4	5	6	Points
1	Nikolas Theodorou (Greece)	2625		1½	4	4	1½	1½	12½
2	Aram Hakobyan (Armenia)	2621	1½		1½	1½	4	1½	10
T-3	Rinat Jumabayev (Kazakhstan)	2546	0	1½		1½	1½	4	8½
T-3	David Navara (Czechia)	2662	0	1½	1½		1½	4	8½
5	Ma Qun (China)	2615	1½	0	1½	1½		1½	6
6	Daniel Dardha (Belgium)	2627	1½	1½	0	0	1½		4½

2025 Biel Challengers Triathlon – Blitz, 20 July, Biel/Bienne, Switzerland
	Player	Rating	1	2	3	4	5	6	Points
1	Aram Hakobyan (Armenia)	2557		1 0	0 1	1 1	½ 1	1 ½	7
2	Nikolas Theodorou (Greece)	2549	0 1		0 1	0 1	½ 1	1 ½	6
T-3	Daniel Dardha (Belgium)	2592	1 0	1 0		½ 0	1 0	½ 1	5
T-3	David Navara (Czechia)	2646	0 0	1 0	½ 1		1 1	0 ½	5
5	Ma Qun (China)	2614	½ 0	½ 0	0 1	0 0		1 1	4
6	Rinat Jumabayev (Kazakhstan)	2520	0 ½	0 ½	½ 0	1 ½	0 0		3

2025 Biel Challengers Triathlon – Final, 22–24 July, Biel/Bienne, Switzerland
	Player	Rating	1	2	3	4	Points
1	Nikolas Theodorou (Greece)	2625		1½	1½	4	7
T-2	Rinat Jumabayev (Kazakhstan)	2546	1½		1½	1½	4½
T-2	Aram Hakobyan (Armenia)	2621	1½	1½		1½	4½
4	David Navara (Czechia)	2662	0	1½	1½		3

Master Tournament Open

2025 Biel Masters Tournament, 14–24 July, Biel/Bienne, Switzerland
	Player	Rating	Points	SB	Circuit
1	Murali Karthikeyan (India)	2650	8/10	51.50	7.10
2	Pranav Anand (India)	2566	7½/10	48.50	4.52
3	Mustafa Yilmaz (Turkey)	2586	7½/10	48.25	4.19
4	Karthik Venkataraman (India)	2540	7½/10	46.50	3.87
5	Pranesh M (India)	2592	7½/10	44.25	3.55
6	Poh Yu Tian (Malaysia)	2458	7½/10	42.50	3.23
7	Benjamin Bok (Netherlands)	2593	7/10	42.00	1.51
8	Đầu Khương Duy (Vietnam)	2456	7/10	40.00	1.18
9	Bành Gia Huy (Vietnam)	2445	7/10	36.75	0.54
10	Christian Gloeckler (Germany)	2439	6½/10	39.25	
Total entries: 112 players

=== 2026 ===
The 2026 event had 2 invitational sections, Masters and Generation Challenge, with 6 players each. Each section had played the same triathlon format from the previous event with the same point distribution. After all three phases were played, top 3 in total points, along with 4th place if they were within 12 points from first place, continued to play with a second classical round-robin. In case of a tie, the ranking in the ACCENTUS Chess960 decided upon the final ranking of the Triathlon and the corresponding prizes.

2026 Biel Masters Triathlon, 12-23 July, Biel/Bienne, Switzerland
	Player	Rapid	Classical 1	Blitz	Classical 2	Total	ACC-960
1	Levon Aronian (United States)	9	7½	8½	4½	29½	
2	Aydin Suleymanli (Azerbaijan)	6	10	5	4½	25½	
3	Yağız Kaan Erdoğmuş (Turkey)	3	10	6½	4½	24	4
4	Lê Quang Liêm (Vietnam)	4	11	4½	4½	24	3
5	Matthias Blübaum (Germany)	4	6	2½		12½	
6	José Martínez Alcántara (Mexico)	4	4½	3		11½	

2026 Biel Masters Triathlon – Rapid, 12 July, Biel/Bienne, Switzerland
	Player	Rating	1	2	3	4	5	6	Points
1	Levon Aronian (United States)	2735		1	2	2	2	2	9
2	Aydin Suleymanli (Azerbaijan)	2561	1		1	1	2	1	6
3	José Martínez Alcántara (Mexico)	2620	0	1		1	2	0	4
4	Matthias Blübaum (Germany)	2587	0	1	1		0	2	4
5	Lê Quang Liêm (Vietnam)	2633	0	0	0	2		2	4
6	Yağız Kaan Erdoğmuş (Turkey)	2493	0	1	2	0	0		3

2026 Biel Masters Triathlon – Classical, 14–18 July, Biel/Bienne, Switzerland
	Player	Rating	1	2	3	4	5	6	Points
1	Lê Quang Liêm (Vietnam)	2731		0	1½	1½	4	4	11
2	Aydin Suleymanli (Azerbaijan)	2657	4		1½	1½	1½	1½	10
3	Yağız Kaan Erdoğmuş (Turkey)	2713	1½	1½		1½	1½	4	10
4	Levon Aronian (United States)	2724	1½	1½	1½		1½	1½	7½
5	Matthias Blübaum (Germany)	2694	0	1½	1½	1½		1½	6
6	José Martínez Alcántara (Mexico)	2650	0	1½	0	1½	1½		4½

2026 Biel Masters Triathlon – Blitz, 19 July, Biel/Bienne, Switzerland
	Player	Rating	1	2	3	4	5	6	Points
1	Levon Aronian (United States)	2700		0 1	1 1	1 1	1 1	½ 1	8½
2	Yağız Kaan Erdoğmuş (Turkey)	2546	1 0		½ 1	½ ½	1 0	1 1	6½
3	Aydin Suleymanli (Azerbaijan)	2559	0 0	½ 0		1 ½	1 1	½ ½	5
4	Lê Quang Liêm (Vietnam)	2690	0 0	½ ½	0 ½		1 1	½ ½	4½
5	José Martínez Alcántara (Mexico)	2641	0 0	0 1	0 0	0 0		1 1	3
6	Matthias Blübaum (Germany)	2634	½ 0	0 0	½ ½	½ ½	0 0		2½

2026 Biel Masters Triathlon – Final, 21–23 July, Biel/Bienne, Switzerland
	Player	Rating	1	2	3	4	Points
1	Lê Quang Liêm (Vietnam)	2731		1½	1½	1½	4½
2	Levon Aronian (United States)	2724	1½		1½	1½	4½
3	Yağız Kaan Erdoğmuş (Turkey)	2713	1½	1½		1½	4½
4	Aydin Suleymanli (Azerbaijan)	2657	1½	1½	1½		4½

2026 Biel Generations Challenge Triathlon, 12-23 July, Biel/Bienne, Switzerland
	Player	Rapid	Classical 1	Blitz	Classical 2	Total
1	IM Václav Finěk (Czech Republic)	8	12½	7½	3	31
2	GM Xiao Tong (China)	7	10	8	3	28
3	IM Marco Materia (France)	7	10	6	3	26
4	GM Alexandra Kosteniuk (Switzerland)	3	7	5½		15½
5	IM Carissa Yip (United States)	3	7	1		11
6	GM Vaishali Rameshbabu (India)	2	4½	2		8½

2026 Biel Generations Challenge Triathlon – Rapid, 12 July, Biel/Bienne, Switzerland
	Player	Rating	1	2	3	4	5	6	Points
1	IM Václav Finěk (Czech Republic)	2454		1	2	1	2	2	8
2	GM Xiao Tong (China)	2452	1		1	1	2	2	7
3	IM Marco Materia (France)	2491	0	1		2	2	2	7
4	GM Alexandra Kosteniuk (Switzerland)	2431	1	1	0		1	0	3
5	IM Carissa Yip (United States)	2333	0	0	0	1		2	3
6	GM Vaishali Rameshbabu (India)	2410	0	0	0	2	0		2

2026 Biel Generations Challenge Triathlon – Classical, 15–19 July, Biel/Bienne, Switzerland
	Player	Rating	1	2	3	4	5	6	Points
1	IM Václav Finěk (Czech Republic)	2593		1½	1½	4	1½	4	12½
2	IM Marco Materia (France)	2508	1½		1½	1½	4	1½	10
3	GM Xiao Tong (China)	2599	1½	1½		4	1½	1½	10
4	GM Alexandra Kosteniuk (Switzerland)	2508	0	1½	0		4	1½	7
5	IM Carissa Yip (United States)	2458	1½	0	1½	0		4	7
6	GM Vaishali Rameshbabu (India)	2496	0	1½	1½	1½	0		4½

2026 Biel Genrations Challenge Triathlon – Blitz, 19 July, Biel/Bienne, Switzerland
	Player	Rating	1	2	3	4	5	6	Points
1	GM Xiao Tong (China)	2465		½ ½	½ 1	1 ½	1 1	1 1	8
2	IM Václav Finěk (Czech Republic)	2504	½ ½		½ 1	1 0	1 1	1 1	7½
3	IM Marco Materia (France)	2509	½ 0	½ 0		½ ½	1 1	1 1	6
4	GM Alexandra Kosteniuk (Switzerland)	2392	0 ½	0 1	½ ½		1 1	1 0	5½
5	GM Vaishali Rameshbabu (India)	2364	0 0	0 0	0 0	0 0		1 1	2
6	IM Carissa Yip (United States)	2369	0 0	0 0	0 0	0 1	0 0		1

2026 Biel Generations Challenge Triathlon – Final, 21–23 July, Biel/Bienne, Switzerland
	Player	Rating	1	2	3	Points
1	GM Xiao Tong (China)	2599		1½	1½	3
2	IM Václav Finěk (Czech Republic)	2593	1½		1½	3
3	IM Marco Materia (France)	2508	1½	1½		3

Master Tournament Open

2026 Biel Masters Tournament, 13–23 July, Biel/Bienne, Switzerland
	Player	Rating	Points	BC-1
1	Christian Gloeckler (Germany)	2506	8/10	58
2	Cao Qingfeng (China)	2365	7½/10	58.5
3	Ádám Kozák (Hungary)	2531	7½/10	58
4	Aronyak Ghosh (India)	2549	7/10	58.5
5	Dimitris Alexakis (Greece)	2525	7/10	58
6	Geetha Narayanan Gopal (India)	2529	7/10	57.5
7	Savitha Shri Baskar (India)	2368	7/10	56.5
8	Diptayan Ghosh (India)	2554	7/10	56
9	Saad Abobaker Elmi (Norway)	2399	7/9	52
10	Péter Ács (Hungary)	2561	6½/10	61
Total entries: 94 players
