= Xu Yi (chess player) =

Chinese chess grandmaster (born 1998)

Personal information
- Born: May 28, 1998 (age 28) Shanghai, China

Chess career
- Country: China
- Title: Grandmaster (2019)
- FIDE rating: 2449 (July 2026)
- Peak rating: 2546 (May 2019)

Xu Yi (Chinese: 徐译; born May 28, 1998) is a Chinese chess grandmaster.

== Chess career ==
In March 2017, Xu won the Shanghai Haiwan Cup, a national youth tournament, ahead of Liu Yan, Peng Xiongjian, and Wang Tongsen.

In November 2022, Xu played for the Toledo City Trojans in the Professional Chess Association of the Philippines (PCAP) Third Conference.

In July 2023, Xu won the Thailand International Chess Open Masters ahead of Diptayan Ghosh, and was undefeated during the event. In that same month, he served as a FIDE commentator for the Women's World Chess Championship 2023 alongside Alik Gershon.

== Personal life ==
Xu studied at the Shanghai University of Finance and Economics.
