= Páng (surname) =

Páng (Chinese: 逄) is a Chinese surname, one of the Hundred Family Surnames. Notable people with the name include:

- Ai-Chun Pang (Chinese: 逄愛君), Taiwanese computer scientist
- Pang Ji (Chinese: 逄紀, died 202), Eastern Han dynasty politician
- Pang Tao (Chinese: 逄韬, born 2001), Chinese chess grandmaster
- Pang Yao (Chinese: 逄瑤, born 1995), Chinese cyclist
- Pang Zhiquan (Chinese: 逄志泉, born 1990), Chinese footballer
