= Robert Shlyakhtenko =

American chess player (born 2005)

Personal information
- Born: May 9, 2005 (age 21) Los Angeles, California, U.S.

Chess career
- Country: United States
- Title: International Master (2022)
- FIDE rating: 2401 (October 2026)
- Peak rating: 2461 (January 2026)

Robert Shlyakhtenko (born May 9, 2005) is an American chess player.

== Chess career ==
In June 2016, he had been the national No. 1 blitz player for his age range for over a year.

In January 2020, he won the Dreaming King Open, finishing a half-point ahead of runner-up John Daniel Bryant.

He finished in third place in the 2020 US Chess Grand Prix, ahead of grandmasters Alexander Shabalov and Fidel Corrales Jimenez.

In July 2023, he tied for third place at the Biel Masters Tournament, during which he achieved a draw against grandmaster Liu Yan and a win against grandmaster Luis Ernesto Quesada Pérez.

In September 2024, he tied for second with grandmaster Oliver Barbosa in the Marshall Chess Club Labor Day Invitational GM A.

== Personal life ==
Off the chessboard, he is also a pianist and studied piano performance under Saleem Ashkar at Brown University.
