= Jonathan Dourerassou =

French chess grandmaster (born 1989)

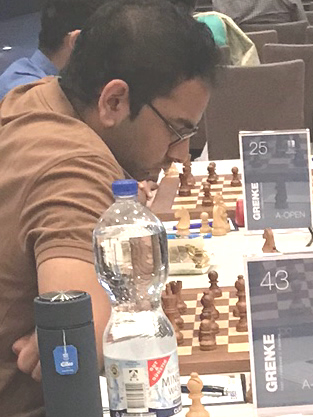

Personal information
- Born: April 10, 1989 (age 37) Sarcelles, France

Chess career
- Country: France
- Title: Grandmaster (2016)
- Peak rating: 2515 (July 2014)

Jonathan Dourerassou is a French chess grandmaster.

== Chess career ==
He earned his GM norms at the:

- Czech Open at Paradubice in July 2013
- Avoriaz 2015 at Morzine in July 2015
- Vandoeuvre International Open at Vandoeuvre in December 2015

In October 2014, he finished in the top 14 in the Open Oscaro, qualifying for the knockout stage of the Corsica Masters as a result.

In April 2024, he finished second in the Noisiel Blitz Rating Open with a score of 7/9, losing the championship to Harikrishnan A Ra.
