= Linares International Chess Tournament =

Traditional major international chess tournament

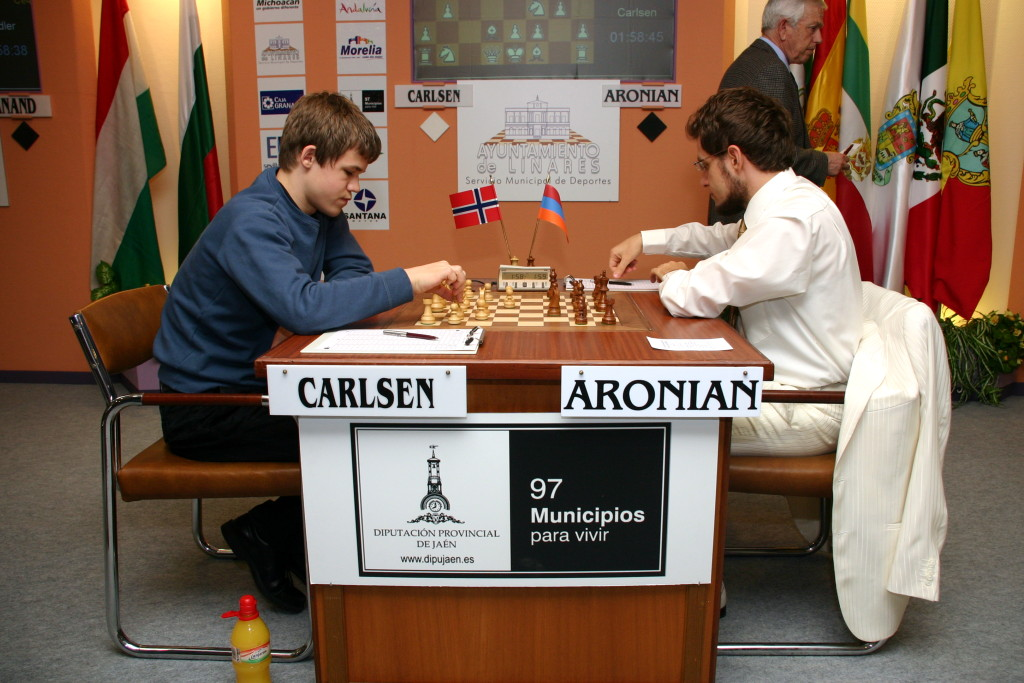
- Magnus Carlsen (Norway) and Levon Aronian (Armenia) playing against each other during the 2007 Linares International Chess Tournament

Tournament information
- Sport: Chess
- Location: Linares, Jaén, Spain; Morelia, Mexico (2006–2009)
- Established: 1978
- Defunct: 2010
- Format: Round-robin tournament
- Most championships: (Russia) Garry Kasparov (9)

Final champion
- (Bulgaria) Veselin Topalov

The Linares International Chess Tournament (Spanish: Torneo Internacional de Ajedrez Ciudad de Linares) was an annual chess tournament, usually played around the end of February, which takes its name from the city of Linares in the Jaén province of Andalusia, Spain, in which it was held. It is sometimes described as the Wimbledon of chess, being one of the strongest annual tournaments held on the de facto chess tour, along with the Tata Steel Chess Tournament, Tal Memorial, and Dortmund events.

The Linares tournament began in 1978 and was held annually from 1988 to 2010 (with the exception of 1996). Since 2010, the tournament has not been held for financial reasons.

== History ==
The event, sponsored by Spanish businessman Luis Rentero, was first held in 1978. At that time it was not an elite event and was won by the relatively unknown Swede Jaan Eslon, on tie-break from the Argentine Roberto Luis Debarnot. After the following year's event, it was held every other year until 1987 when no tournament took place, that being the year that Linares hosted the Candidates' Final, a match to determine a challenger for Kasparov's world title featuring Anatoly Karpov and Andrei Sokolov. The postponed 1987 event was deferred to 1988 and the tournament from that point onwards became an annual event, with the exception of 1996, when the Women's World Chess Championship was held. Rentero was a strong opponent of short draws in chess, to the point that he offered cash bonuses for playing longer games. It's said that participants in these so-called "grand master draws" were sometimes penalised by receiving no invitation for the next year's edition. The 1994 tournament had an average Elo rating of 2685, the highest ever at that time. The field, in eventual finishing order, consisted of Karpov, Kasparov, Shirov, Bareev, Kramnik, Lautier, Anand, Kamsky, Topalov, Ivanchuk, Gelfand, Illescas, Judit Polgár, and Beliavsky. Karpov won with an undefeated 11/13. Jeff Sonas considered Karpov's performance the best tournament result in history. The 1994 tournament was also noted for an incident in which Garry Kasparov "took a move back" against Judit Polgár. Kasparov's fingers briefly released a knight before he realized the move was a blunder; he then moved the knight to a different square. Polgár (17 years old at the time) did not protest and the arbiter did not intervene. Kasparov went on to win the game.

In 1998, the format of the tournament changed from a single round-robin tournament to a double round-robin event (meaning that each participant plays every other participant twice, once with each colour).

Kasparov announced his retirement from chess after the 2005 tournament.

From 2006 through 2008, the first half of the tournament took place in the Mexican city of Morelia. The second half took place in Linares. Consequently, the event is sometimes referred to as Morelia-Linares.

In 2009 and 2010, the whole event took place in Linares.

The Linares tournament of 2011 was cancelled, for reasons including general economic problems. The tournament was cancelled again in 2012, with no return since.

== Winners ==
- 1978 (Sweden) Jaan Eslon
- 1979 (United States) Larry Christiansen
- 1980 no tournament
- 1981 (Soviet Union) Anatoly Karpov and (United States) Larry Christiansen
- 1982 no tournament
- 1983 (France) Boris Spassky
- 1984 no tournament
- 1985 (Socialist Federal Republic of Yugoslavia) Ljubomir Ljubojević and (West Germany) Robert Hübner
- 1986 no tournament
- 1987 no tournament
- 1988 (Netherlands) Jan Timman
- 1989 (Soviet Union) Vasyl Ivanchuk
- 1990 (Soviet Union) Garry Kasparov
- 1991 (Soviet Union) Vasyl Ivanchuk
- 1992 (Russia) Garry Kasparov
- 1993 (Russia) Garry Kasparov
- 1994 (Russia) Anatoly Karpov
- 1995 (Ukraine) Vasyl Ivanchuk
- 1996 no tournament
- 1997 (Russia) Garry Kasparov
- 1998 (India) Viswanathan Anand
- 1999 (Russia) Garry Kasparov
- 2000 (Russia) Garry Kasparov and (Russia) Vladimir Kramnik
- 2001 (Russia) Garry Kasparov
- 2002 (Russia) Garry Kasparov
- 2003 (Hungary) Peter Leko (with the same score as (Russia) Vladimir Kramnik; won on tiebreak because of more wins)
- 2004 (Russia) Vladimir Kramnik
- 2005 (Russia) Garry Kasparov (with the same score as (Bulgaria) Veselin Topalov; won on tiebreak because of more wins with black)
- 2006 (Armenia) Levon Aronian
- 2007 (India) Viswanathan Anand
- 2008 (India) Viswanathan Anand
- 2009 (Russia) Alexander Grischuk (with the same score as (Ukraine) Vasyl Ivanchuk; won on tiebreak because of more wins)
- 2010 (Bulgaria) Veselin Topalov

Only six players won the Linares Tournament multiple times: Garry Kasparov (9 wins), Vassily Ivanchuk (3), Viswanathan Anand (3), Vladimir Kramnik (2), Anatoly Karpov (2), and Larry Christiansen (2).

== Full results ==
=== 1970s ===
==== 1978 ====
30 November - 8 December 1978

                             1  2  3  4  5  6  7  8  9  0
01 Jaan Eslon                *  ½  ½  ½  ½  1  1  1  0  1   6
02 Roberto Luis Debarnot     ½  *  ½  ½  1  ½  ½  ½  1  1   6
03 F. Javier Ochoa           ½  ½  *  ½  ½  ½  ½  ½  1  1   5½
04 Ángel Martín              ½  ½  ½  *  ½  0  ½  ½  1  1   5
05 Ernesto Palacios          ½  0  ½  ½  *  ½  ½  ½  1  ½   4½
08 Antonio Àngel Medina      0  ½  ½  ½  ½  ½  ½  *  ½  1   4½
07 Orestes Rodríguez         0  ½  ½  ½  ½  ½  *  ½  ½  1   4½
06 Fernando Visier           0  ½  ½  1  ½  *  ½  ½  0  1   4½
09 Oscar H. Castro Rojas     1  0  0  0  0  1  ½  ½  *  ½   3½
10 V. Pacheco                0  0  0  0  ½  0  0  0  ½  *   1

Category: V (2363)

==== 1979 ====
30 November - 11 December 1979

                          1  2  3  4  5  6  7  8  9  0  1  2 
01 Larry M. Christiansen  *  0  ½  1  1  ½  1  1  ½  ½  1  1  8 
02 Viktor Korchnoi        1  *  0  1  1  ½  0  ½  ½  1  1  1  8 
03 Manuel Rivas           ½  1  *  0  0  1  ½  1  1  1  1  ½  7½ 
04 Oscar Castro           0  0  1  *  ½  ½  ½  1  1  1  1  1  7½ 
05 Jaan Eslon             0  0  1  ½  *  ½  ½  0  ½  ½  1  1  5½ 
06 Dragutin Sahovic       ½  ½  0  ½  ½  *  ½  1  ½  ½  0  ½  5 
07 Drazen Marovic         0  1  ½  ½  ½  ½  *  0  ½  ½  ½  ½  5 
08 Ricardo Calvo          0  ½  0  0  1  0  1  *  0  ½  1  1  5 
09 Evgenij Ermenkov       ½  ½  0  0  ½  ½  ½  1  *  ½  0  ½  4½ 
10 Milorad Knesevic       ½  0  0  0  ½  ½  ½  ½  ½  *  ½  ½  4 
11 Juan Manuel Bellon     0  0  0  0  0  1  ½  0  1  ½  *  ½  3½ 
12 Fernando Visier        0  0  ½  0  0  ½  ½  0  ½  ½  ½  *  3

Category: IX (2459)

=== 1980s ===
==== 1981 ====
Casa de la Cultura, Linares, Spain, 17–31 January 1981

                          Age Elo  1 2 3 4 5 6 7 8 9 0 1 2
01 Anatoly Karpov         29 2690  * 1 ½ ½ ½ ½ 1 1 ½ 1 ½ 1  8
02 Larry M. Christiansen  24 2515  0 * ½ ½ 1 ½ 1 ½ 1 1 1 1  8
03 Bent Larsen            45 2610  ½ ½ * 0 0 1 1 ½ 1 ½ 1 1  7
04 Zoltan Ribli           29 2585  ½ ½ 1 * ½ ½ ½ ½ 1 1 0 ½  6½
05 Boris Spassky          43 2635  ½ 0 1 ½ * ½ ½ ½ ½ ½ 1 ½  6
06 Lubomir Kavalek        37 2550  ½ ½ 0 ½ ½ * ½ ½ ½ ½ 1 1  6
07 Lajos Portisch         43 2650  0 0 0 ½ ½ ½ * ½ ½ 1 1 1  5½
08 Ljubomir Ljubojevic    30 2605  0 ½ ½ ½ ½ ½ ½ * 0 ½ 1 ½  5
09 Svetozar Gligoric      57 2530  ½ 0 0 0 ½ ½ ½ 1 * 1 0 1  5
10 Miguel A. Quinteros    33 2505  0 0 ½ 0 ½ ½ 0 ½ 0 * 1 1  4
11 Juan M. Bellón         29 2415  ½ 0 0 1 0 0 0 0 1 0 * 1  3½
12 Guillermo García       27 2520  0 0 0 ½ ½ 0 0 ½ 0 0 0 *  1½

Category: XIII (2568). Chief arbiter: IA José María González.

==== 1983 ====
Casa de Cultura, Linares, Spain, 12–25 February 1983

                   Age  Elo   1  2  3  4  5  6  7  8  9  0  1
01 Boris Spassky   46  2605   *  ½  ½  ½  ½  ½  1  ½  ½  1  1  6½
02 Anatoly Karpov  31  2710   ½  *  ½  ½  ½  1  ½  ½  ½  ½  1  6
03 Ulf Andersson   31  2630   ½  ½  *  ½  ½  ½  ½  ½  ½  1  1  6
04 Artur Yusupov   23  2565   ½  ½  ½  *  ½  ½  1  ½  ½  1  0  5½
05 Anthony Miles   27  2585   ½  ½  ½  ½  *  ½  ½  0  ½  1  1  5½
06 Gyula Sax       31  2560   ½  0  ½  ½  ½  *  0  1  ½  1  1  5½
07 Jan Timman      31  2605   0  ½  ½  0  ½  1  *  1  1  ½  0  5
08 Efim Geller     57  2575   ½  ½  ½  ½  1  0  0  *  ½  ½  1  5
09 Vlastimil Hort  39  2585   ½  ½  ½  ½  ½  ½  0  ½  *  ½  1  5
10 Yasser Seirawan 22  2600   0  ½  0  0  0  0  ½  ½  ½  *  1  3
11 Bent Larsen     47  2555   0  0  0  1  0  0  1  0  0  0  *  2 

Category: XIV (2598). Chief arbiter: IA José María González.

==== 1985 ====
Pabellón Julián Jiménez, Linares, Spain, 8–22 March 1985

                          Age Elo    1  2  3  4  5  6  7  8  9  0  1  2
01 Ljubomir Ljubojevic    34  2595   *  ½  ½  1  ½  0  1  1  ½  1  ½  ½   7
02 Robert Hübner          36  2605   ½  *  ½  1  ½  ½  0  ½  1  1  1  ½   7
03 Lajos Portisch         47  2635   ½  ½  *  1  ½  ½  ½  ½  ½  ½  ½  1   6½
04 Viktor Korchnoi        53  2630   0  0  0  *  ½  1  1  1  1  ½  ½  1   6½
05 Boris Spassky          48  2580   ½  ½  ½  ½  *  ½  ½  ½  ½  ½  1  ½   6
06 Jan Timman             33  2650   1  ½  ½  0  ½  *  ½  1  0  0  1  ½   5½
07 Lev Polugaevsky        50  2625   0  1  ½  0  ½  ½  *  ½  ½  1  ½  ½   5½
08 Anthony Miles          29  2570   0  ½  ½  0  ½  0  ½  *  1  ½  1  1   5½
09 Manuel Rivas           24  2480   ½  0  ½  0  ½  1  ½  0  *  ½  ½  1   5
10 Larry M. Christiansen  28  2560   0  0  ½  ½  ½  1  0  ½  ½  *  0  ½   4
11 Rafael Vaganian        33  2640   ½  0  ½  ½  0  0  ½  0  ½  1  *  ½   4
12 Andras Adorján         34  2565   ½  ½  0  0  ½  ½  ½  0  0  ½  ½  *   3½

Category: XIV (2595). Chief arbiter: Antonio Romero Briones.

=== 1990s ===
==== 1990 ====
Hotel Anibal, Linares, Spain, 18 February - 3 March 1990

              Age Elo   1 2 3 4 5 6 7 8 9 0 1 2
01 Kasparov    26 2800  * ½ ½ 1 1 0 1 ½ 1 1 1 ½  8
02 Gelfand     21 2615  ½ * 1 ½ 0 1 0 1 1 1 ½ 1  7½
03 Salov       25 2645  ½ 0 * ½ 1 ½ 1 ½ ½ 1 1 ½  7
04 Ivanchuk    20 2665  0 ½ ½ * ½ ½ ½ 1 ½ ½ 1 1  6½
05 Short       24 2635  0 1 0 ½ * 1 ½ 1 ½ 1 0 ½  6
06 Gulko       43 2610  1 0 ½ ½ 0 * ½ 0 ½ ½ 1 1  5½
07 Yusupov     30 2615  0 1 0 ½ ½ ½ * ½ 1 0 ½ 1  5½
08 Beliavsky   36 2640  ½ 0 ½ 0 0 1 ½ * 1 0 1 ½  5
09 Spassky     53 2560  0 0 ½ ½ ½ ½ 0 0 * 1 ½ ½  4
10 Illescas    24 2530  0 0 0 ½ 0 ½ 1 1 0 * ½ ½  4
11 Portisch    52 2605  0 ½ 0 0 1 0 ½ 0 ½ ½ * 1  4
12 Ljubojevic  49 2625  ½ 0 ½ 0 ½ 0 0 ½ ½ ½ 0 *  3

==== 1991 ====
Hotel Anibal, Linares, Spain, 23 February - 14 March 1991

              Age Elo   1 2 3 4 5 6 7 8 9 0 1 2 3 4
01 Ivanchuk    21 2695  * 1 ½ ½ ½ ½ ½ 1 ½ 1 1 1 ½ 1  9½
02 Kasparov    27 2800  0 * 1 ½ ½ ½ ½ ½ 1 ½ 1 1 1 1  9
03 Beliavsky   37 2640  ½ 0 * 1 ½ 0 1 0 0 1 1 1 1 1  8
04 Yusupov     31 2605  ½ ½ 0 * 1 1 ½ ½ ½ 0 1 ½ ½ 1  7½
05 Speelman    34 2610  ½ ½ ½ 0 * ½ ½ 1 ½ ½ ½ ½ 1 1  7½
06 Salov       26 2645  ½ ½ 1 0 ½ * ½ ½ ½ 1 ½ 0 ½ 1  7
07 Timman      39 2630  ½ ½ 0 ½ ½ ½ * ½ ½ 0 1 ½ 1 ½  6½      
08 Karpov      39 2725  0 ½ 1 ½ 0 ½ ½ * 0 0 ½ 1 1 1  6½
09 Ljubojevic  40 2590  ½ 0 1 ½ ½ ½ ½ 1 * ½ 0 0 1 0  6
10 Anand       21 2635  0 ½ 0 1 ½ 0 1 1 ½ * 0 0 ½ 1  6
11 Gurevich    32 2650  0 0 0 0 ½ ½ 0 ½ 1 1 * 1 ½ 1  6
12 Gelfand     22 2700  0 0 0 ½ ½ 1 ½ 0 1 1 0 * 0 1  5½
13 Ehlvest     28 2650  ½ 0 0 ½ 0 ½ 0 0 0 ½ ½ 1 * 0  3½
14 Kamsky      16 2640  0 0 0 0 0 0 0 ½ 0 0 1 0 1 *  2½

==== 1992 ====
X Ciudad de Linares, 23 February – 13 March 1992, Linares, Jaén, Spain, Category XVII (2659)
	Player	Rating	1	2	3	4	5	6	7	8	9	10	11	12	13	14	Total	TPR	Place
1	Garry Kasparov (Russia)	2780		½	1	1	½	1	½	½	½	1	1	1	½	1	10	2861	1
2	Vasyl Ivanchuk (Ukraine)	2720	½		½	½	½	1	0	½	½	1	1	½	1	½	8	2741	2–3
3	Jan Timman (Netherlands)	2620	0	½		1	0	½	0	1	0	1	1	1	1	1	8	2749	2–3
4	Anatoly Karpov (Russia)	2725	0	½	0		½	½	1	0	1	½	1	1	½	1	7½	2711	4
5	Viswanathan Anand (India)	2670	½	½	1	½		½	½	½	1	0	1	½	½	0	7	2687	5–7
6	Boris Gelfand (Belarus)	2665	0	0	½	½	½		1	1	0	½	1	½	½	1	7	2687	5–7
7	Valery Salov (Russia)	2655	½	1	1	0	½	0		0	½	½	½	1	½	1	7	2688	5–7
8	Evgeny Bareev (Russia)	2635	½	½	0	1	½	0	1		½	1	0	½	½	½	6½	2661	8
9	Alexander Beliavsky (Ukraine)	2620	½	½	1	0	0	1	½	½		0	½	0	½	1	6	2633	9–10
10	Artur Yusupov (Commonwealth of Independent States)	2655	0	0	0	½	1	½	½	0	1		0	½	1	1	6	2630	9–10
11	Miguel Illescas (Spain)	2555	0	0	0	0	0	0	½	1	½	1		1	1	½	5½	2610	11
12	Ljubomir Ljubojević (Yugoslavia)	2610	0	½	0	0	½	½	0	½	1	½	0		1	0	4½	2553	12
13	Jon Speelman (England)	2630	½	0	0	½	½	½	½	½	½	0	0	0		½	4	2520	13–14
14	Nigel Short (England)	2685	0	½	0	0	1	0	0	½	0	0	½	1	½		4	2516	13–14

==== 1993 ====
XI Ciudad de Linares, 23 February – 14 March 1993, Linares, Jaén, Spain, Category XVIII (2677)
	Player	Rating	1	2	3	4	5	6	7	8	9	10	11	12	13	14	Total	TPR	Place
1	Garry Kasparov (Russia)	2805		1	1	½	½	½	½	½	1	1	½	1	1	1	10	2878	1
2	Anatoly Karpov (Russia)	2725	0		½	½	½	1	½	1	1	½	1	0	1	1	8½	2783	2
3	Viswanathan Anand (India)	2710	0	½		½	½	½	1	0	1	1	½	1	1	1	8½	2784	3
4	Alexei Shirov (Latvia)	2670	½	½	½		1	0	½	0	1	1	½	½	1	1	8	2764	4
5	Vladimir Kramnik (Russia)	2685	½	½	½	0		0	1	1	1	½	½	½	1	½	7½	2733	5
6	Valery Salov (Russia)	2660	½	0	½	1	1		0	½	½	1	½	½	½	0	6½	2678	6–7
7	Vasyl Ivanchuk (Ukraine)	2710	½	½	0	½	0	1		0	0	1	½	1	1	½	6½	2674	6–7
8	Alexander Beliavsky (Ukraine)	2610	½	0	1	1	0	½	1		0	0	½	1	½	0	6	2653	8
9	Gata Kamsky (United States)	2655	0	0	0	0	0	½	1	1		½	1	1	0	½	5½	2621	9–10
10	Evgeny Bareev (Russia)	2670	0	½	0	0	½	0	0	1	½		½	1	½	1	5½	2620	9–10
11	Artur Yusupov (Germany)	2645	½	0	½	½	½	½	½	½	0	½		0	½	½	5	2592	11–12
12	Jan Timman (Netherlands)	2635	0	1	0	½	½	½	0	0	0	0	1		½	1	5	2593	11–12
13	Boris Gelfand (Belarus)	2690	0	0	0	0	0	½	0	½	1	½	½	½		1	4½	2566	13
14	Ljubomir Ljubojević (Federal Republic of Yugoslavia)	2605	0	0	0	0	½	1	½	1	½	0	½	0	0		4	2541	14

==== 1994 ====
XII Ciudad de Linares, 23 February – 14 March 1994, Linares, Jaén, Spain, Category XVIII (2686)
	Player	Rating	1	2	3	4	5	6	7	8	9	10	11	12	13	14	Total	TPR	Place
1	Anatoly Karpov (Russia)	2740		½	½	1	1	1	1	½	½	1	1	1	1	1	11	2978	1
2	Garry Kasparov (Russia)	2815	½		½	1	0	0	½	1	1	1	½	1	1	½	8½	2786	2–3
3	Alexei Shirov (Latvia)	2715	½	½		0	0	1	1	½	1	1	½	1	1	½	8½	2794	2–3
4	Evgeny Bareev (Russia)	2685	0	0	1		½	½	1	½	½	1	0	1	½	1	7½	2743	4
5	Joël Lautier (France)	2625	0	1	1	½		½	1	1	0	0	½	0	1	½	7	2720	5–6
6	Vladimir Kramnik (Russia)	2710	0	1	0	½	½		0	½	½	½	½	1	1	1	7	2713	5–6
7	Veselin Topalov (Bulgaria)	2640	0	½	0	0	0	1		1	½	1	1	½	0	1	6½	2690	7–9
8	Viswanathan Anand (India)	2715	½	0	½	½	0	½	0		1	0	½	1	1	1	6½	2684	7–9
9	Gata Kamsky (United States)	2695	½	0	0	½	1	½	½	0		½	½	1	½	1	6½	2685	7–9
10	Vasyl Ivanchuk (Ukraine)	2710	0	0	0	0	1	½	0	1	½		½	1	½	1	6	2655	10
11	Boris Gelfand (Belarus)	2685	0	½	½	1	½	½	0	½	½	½		0	½	½	5½	2629	11
12	Miguel Illescas (Spain)	2590	0	0	0	0	1	0	½	0	0	0	1		1	1	4½	2583	12
13	Judit Polgár (Hungary)	2630	0	0	0	½	0	0	1	0	½	½	½	0		1	4	2549	13
14	Alexander Beliavsky (Ukraine)	2650	0	½	½	0	½	0	0	0	0	0	½	0	0		2	2393	14

==== 1995 ====
XIII Ciudad de Linares, 1 – 18 March 1995, Linares, Jaén, Spain, Category XVII (2654)
	Player	Rating	1	2	3	4	5	6	7	8	9	10	11	12	13	14	Total	TPR	Place
1	Vasyl Ivanchuk (Ukraine)	2700		½	½	1	½	1	1	½	½	1	½	1	1	1	10	2861	1
2	Anatoly Karpov (Russia)	2765	½		½	1	1	½	½	½	1	½	1	½	1	½	9	2786	2
3	Alexei Shirov (Latvia)	2710	½	½		1	½	½	½	½	1	½	½	½	½	1	8	2736	3–4
4	Veselin Topalov (Bulgaria)	2630	0	0	0		½	1	½	1	1	1	1	½	½	1	8	2742	3–4
5	Alexander Khalifman (Russia)	2635	½	0	½	½		1	1	½	½	0	½	½	1	1	7½	2712	5
6	Alexander Beliavsky (Ukraine)	2650	0	½	½	0	0		1	½	½	½	1	½	1	1	7	2682	6
7	Sergei Tiviakov (Russia)	2625	0	½	½	½	0	0		1	½	½	1	½	½	½	6	2626	7–8
8	Miguel Illescas (Spain)	2595	½	½	½	0	½	½	0		0	½	1	½	1	½	6	2629	7–8
9	Ivan Sokolov (Bosnia and Herzegovina)	2645	½	0	0	0	½	½	½	1		½	½	1	0	½	5½	2597	9–10
10	Alexey Dreev (Russia)	2650	0	½	½	0	1	½	½	½	½		0	½	0	1	5½	2596	9–10
11	Nigel Short (England)	2655	½	0	½	0	½	0	0	0	½	1		1	½	½	5	2566	11–12
12	Ljubomir Ljubojević (Federal Republic of Yugoslavia)	2580	0	½	½	½	½	½	½	½	0	½	0		½	½	5	2572	11–12
13	Joël Lautier (France)	2655	0	0	½	½	0	0	½	0	1	1	½	½		0	4½	2543	13
14	Vladimir Akopian (Armenia)	2655	0	½	0	0	0	0	½	½	½	0	½	½	1		4	2512	14

==== 1997 ====
XIV Ciudad de Linares, 4 – 16 February 1997, Linares, Jaén, Spain, Category XIX (2701)
	Player	Rating	1	2	3	4	5	6	7	8	9	10	11	12	Total	TPR	Place
1	Garry Kasparov (Russia)	2795		1	1	1	1	1	½	0	1	½	1	½	8½	2903	1
2	Vladimir Kramnik (Russia)	2740	0		½	1	1	½	½	1	½	1	½	1	7½	2830	2
3	Michael Adams (England)	2665	0	½		½	½	½	1	½	½	1	1	½	6½	2769	3–4
4	Veselin Topalov (Bulgaria)	2725	0	0	½		½	½	1	1	1	1	0	1	6½	2763	3–4
5	Judit Polgár (Hungary)	2645	0	0	½	½		0	½	1	1	1	½	1	6	2741	5
6	Viswanathan Anand (India)	2765	0	½	½	½	1		½	½	0	1	½	½	5½	2695	6
7	Boris Gelfand (Belarus)	2700	½	½	0	0	½	½		½	1	½	½	½	5	2664	7–8
8	Vasyl Ivanchuk (Ukraine)	2740	1	0	½	0	0	½	½		½	0	1	1	5	2661	7–8
9	Predrag Nikolić (Bosnia and Herzegovina)	2655	0	½	½	0	0	1	0	½		½	1	½	4½	2640	9
10	Alexey Dreev (Russia)	2650	½	0	0	0	0	0	½	1	½		½	1	4	2603	10
11	Alexei Shirov (Spain)	2690	0	½	0	1	½	½	½	0	0	½		0	3½	2568	11–12
12	Jeroen Piket (Netherlands)	2640	½	0	½	0	0	½	½	0	½	0	1		3½	2573	11–12

==== 1998 ====
Final Results of 1998:

XV Ciudad de Linares, 22 February – 9 March 1998, Linares, Jaén, Spain, Category XXI (2752)
	Player	Rating	1	2	3	4	5	6	7	Total	TPR	Place
1	Viswanathan Anand (India)	2770		1 ½	½ ½	0 ½	1 ½	½ 1	½ 1	7½	2844	1
2	Alexei Shirov (Spain)	2710	0 ½		½ 1	½ ½	1 0	1 0	1 1	7	2816	2
3	Vladimir Kramnik (Russia)	2790	½ ½	½ 0		½ ½	½ 1	½ ½	1 ½	6½	2774	3–4
4	Garry Kasparov (Russia)	2825	1 ½	½ ½	½ ½		½ ½	½ ½	½ ½	6½	2769	3–4
5	Peter Svidler (Russia)	2690	0 ½	0 1	½ 0	½ ½		1 0	½ 1	5½	2733	5
6	Vasyl Ivanchuk (Ukraine)	2740	½ 0	0 1	½ ½	½ ½	0 1		0 ½	5	2697	6
7	Veselin Topalov (Bulgaria)	2740	½ 0	0 0	0 ½	½ ½	½ 0	1 ½		4	2629	7

==== 1999 ====
Final Results of 1999:

XVI Ciudad de Linares, 21 February – 10 March 1999, Linares, Jaén, Spain, Category XX (2735)
	Player	Rating	1	2	3	4	5	6	7	8	Total	Wins	TPR
1	Garry Kasparov (Russia)	2812		½ 1	½ ½	½ ½	1 1	1 ½	½ 1	1 1	10½		2817
2	Viswanathan Anand (India)	2781	½ 0		½ ½	½ ½	½ ½	½ 1	1 ½	½ 1	8	3	2778
3	Vladimir Kramnik (Russia)	2751	½ ½	½ ½		½ ½	½ ½	½ ½	½ 1	1 ½	8	2	2782
4	Peter Leko (Hungary)	2694	½ ½	½ ½	½ ½		1 ½	½ ½	0 ½	0 ½	6½		2712
5	Vasyl Ivanchuk (Ukraine)	2714	0 0	½ ½	½ ½	0 ½		½ 1	1 ½	0 ½	6	2	2688
6	Veselin Topalov (Bulgaria)	2700	0 ½	½ 0	½ ½	½ ½	½ 0		½ 1	½ ½	6	1	2690
7	Peter Svidler (Russia)	2713	½ 0	0 ½	½ 0	1 ½	0 ½	½ 0		½ 1	5½	2	2658
8	Michael Adams (England)	2716	0 0	½ 0	0 ½	1 ½	1 ½	½ ½	½ 0		5½	2	2657

=== 2000s ===
==== 2000 ====
FIDE World Champion Alexander Khalifman was a late replacement for Alexander Morozevich.

Final Results of 2000:

XVII SuperGM Linares, 28 February – 10 March 2000, Linares, Jaén, Spain, Category XXI (2752)
	Player	Rating	1	2	3	4	5	6	Total	Wins	W/Black	TPR
1-2	Garry Kasparov (Russia)	2851		½ ½	1 ½	1 ½	½ ½	½ ½	6	2	1	2803
1-2	Vladimir Kramnik (Russia)	2758	½ ½		1 ½	½ ½	1 ½	½ ½	6	2	1	2822
3	Alexei Shirov (Spain)	2751	0 ½	0 ½		1 ½	½ ½	½ ½	4½	1	1	2715
4	Viswanathan Anand (India)	2769	0 ½	½ ½	0 ½		½ 1	½ ½	4½	1	0	2712
5	Alexander Khalifman (Russia)	2656	½ ½	0 ½	½ ½	½ 0		½ 1	4½	1	0	2734
6	Peter Leko (Hungary)	2725	½ ½	½ ½	½ ½	½ ½	½ 0		4½	0		2721

==== 2001 ====
Final Results of 2001:

XVIII SuperGM Linares, 23 February – 6 March 2001, Linares, Jaén, Spain, Category XX (2722)
	Player	Rating	1	2	3	4	5	6	Total	Wins	TPR
1	Garry Kasparov (Russia)	2849		½ 1	1 1	½ ½	½ 1	½ 1	7½		2889
2	Alexei Shirov (Spain)	2718	½ 0		1 0	0 1	½ ½	½ ½	4½	2	2686
3	Alexander Grischuk (Russia)	2663	0 0	0 1		½ ½	½ 1	½ ½	4½	2	2697
4	Judit Polgár (Hungary)	2676	½ ½	1 0	½ ½		½ 0	½ ½	4½	1	2694
5	Anatoly Karpov (Russia)	2679	½ 0	½ ½	½ 0	½ 1		½ ½	4½	1	2694
6	Peter Leko (Hungary)	2745	½ 0	½ ½	½ ½	½ ½	½ ½		4½	0	2681

==== 2002 ====
Final Results of 2002:

XIX SuperGM Linares, 22 February – 10 March 2002, Linares, Jaén, Spain, Category XX (2732)
	Player	Rating	1	2	3	4	5	6	7	Total	TPR
1	Garry Kasparov (Russia)	2838		½ 1	½ ½	½ ½	1 ½	½ 1	½ 1	8	2839
2	Ruslan Ponomariov (Ukraine)	2727	½ 0		1 ½	½ ½	0 1	½ 1	½ ½	6½	2762
3	Vasyl Ivanchuk (Ukraine)	2717	½ ½	0 ½		½ ½	1 ½	½ 1	½ 0	6	2734
4	Viswanathan Anand (India)	2757	½ ½	½ ½	½ ½		0 ½	½ ½	½ 1	6	2728
5	Michael Adams (England)	2742	0 ½	1 0	0 ½	1 ½		½ ½	½ 1	6	2730
6	Francisco Vallejo Pons (Spain)	2629	½ 0	½ 0	½ 0	½ ½	½ ½		½ 1	5	2692
7	Alexei Shirov (Spain)	2715	½ 0	½ ½	½ 1	½ 0	½ 0	½ 0		4½	2648

==== 2003 ====
Final Results of 2003:

XX Ciudad de Linares, 22 February – 9 March 2003, Linares, Jaén, Spain, Category XX (2733)
	Player	Rating	1	2	3	4	5	6	7	Total	Wins	TPR
1	Peter Leko (Hungary)	2736		½ ½	0 1	½ ½	½ ½	1 0	1 1	7	4	2790
2	Vladimir Kramnik (Russia)	2809	½ ½		½ ½	½ ½	1 ½	½ ½	1 ½	7	2	2778
3	Viswanathan Anand (India)	2753	1 0	½ ½		0 ½	1 ½	½ ½	½ 1	6½	3	2759
4	Garry Kasparov (Russia)	2847	½ ½	½ ½	1 ½		1 ½	½ ½	0 ½	6½	2	2743
5	Ruslan Ponomariov (Ukraine)	2734	½ ½	0 ½	0 ½	0 ½		1 1	½ ½	5½		2704
6	Francisco Vallejo Pons (Spain)	2629	0 1	½ ½	½ ½	½ ½	0 0		½ ½	5		2694
7	Teimour Radjabov (Azerbaijan)	2624	0 0	0 ½	½ 0	1 ½	½ ½	½ ½		4½		2664

==== 2004 ====
Final Results of 2004:

XXI SuperGM Linares, 19 February – 5 March 2004, Linares, Jaén, Spain, Category XX (2731)
	Player	Rating	1	2	3	4	5	6	7	Total	Wins	TPR
1	Vladimir Kramnik (Russia)	2777		½ 1	½ ½	½ ½	1 ½	½ ½	½ ½	7		2780
2	Peter Leko (Hungary)	2722	½ 0		½ ½	1 ½	½ ½	1 ½	½ ½	6½	2	2762
3	Garry Kasparov (Russia)	2831	½ ½	½ ½		½ ½	½ ½	½ ½	1 ½	6½	1	2743
4	Teimour Radjabov (Azerbaijan)	2656	½ ½	0 ½	½ ½		½ ½	0 1	½ 1	6	2	2744
5	Veselin Topalov (Bulgaria)	2735	0 ½	½ ½	½ ½	½ ½		½ 1	½ ½	6	1	2730
6	Alexei Shirov (Spain)	2736	½ ½	0 ½	½ ½	1 0	½ 0		½ ½	5	1	2673
7	Francisco Vallejo Pons (Spain)	2663	½ ½	½ ½	0 ½	½ 0	½ ½	½ ½		5	0	2685

==== 2005 ====
Final Results of 2005:

XXII SuperGM Linares, 23 February – 17 March 2005, Linares, Jaén, Spain, Category XX (2743)
	Player	Rating	1	2	3	4	5	6	7	Total	Wins	W/Black	TPR
1	Garry Kasparov (Russia)	2804		½ 0	½ ½	½ ½	1 1	1 1	½ 1	8	5	3	2857
2	Veselin Topalov (Bulgaria)	2757	½ 1		0 ½	½ ½	1 ½	1 1	½ 1	8	5	1	2865
3	Viswanathan Anand (India)	2786	½ ½	1 ½		½ ½	½ 0	½ ½	½ 1	6½			2764
4	Peter Leko (Hungary)	2749	½ ½	½ ½	½ ½		½ ½	½ ½	½ ½	6			2742
5	Michael Adams (England)	2741	0 0	0 ½	½ 1	½ ½		1 ½	½ ½	5½			2714
6	Francisco Vallejo Pons (Spain)	2686	0 0	0 0	½ ½	½ ½	0 ½		½ 1	4	1		2627
7	Rustam Kasimdzhanov (Uzbekistan)	2678	½ 0	½ 0	½ 0	½ ½	½ ½	½ 0		4	0		2628

==== 2006 ====
XXIII SuperGM Morelia/Linares, 18 February – 11 March 2006, Morelia – Linares, Category XX (2732)
	Player	Rating	1	2	3	4	5	6	7	8	Total	TPR
1	Levon Aronian (Armenia)	2752		1 ½	½ 0	½ 1	0 ½	1 ½	1 ½	½ 1	8½	2808
2	Teimour Radjabov (Azerbaijan)	2700	0 ½		1 ½	0 ½	½ 1	½ 1	1 ½	½ ½	8	2786
3	Veselin Topalov (Bulgaria)	2801	½ 1	0 ½		½ 1	1 ½	0 1	½ 1	0 ½	8	2771
4	Peter Leko (Hungary)	2740	½ 0	1 ½	½ 0		1 ½	½ ½	½ ½	1 ½	7½	2759
5	Vasyl Ivanchuk (Ukraine)	2729	1 ½	½ 0	0 ½	0 ½		1 ½	½ 0	½ 1	6½	2703
6	Peter Svidler (Russia)	2765	0 ½	0 ½	1 0	½ ½	0 ½		1 ½	1 ½	6½	2698
7	Étienne Bacrot (France)	2717	0 ½	0 ½	½ 0	½ ½	½ 1	0 ½		½ 1	6	2683
8	Francisco Vallejo Pons (Spain)	2650	½ 0	½ ½	1 ½	0 ½	½ 0	0 ½	½ 0		5	2641

==== 2007 ====
XXIV SuperGM Morelia/Linares, 17 February – 10 March 2007, Morelia – Linares, Category XX (2746)
	Player	Rating	1	2	3	4	5	6	7	8	Total	TPR
1	Viswanathan Anand (India)	2779		1 1	1 ½	0 ½	½ ½	½ ½	½ ½	1 ½	8½	2820
2	Magnus Carlsen (Norway)	2690	0 0		1 ½	½ ½	½ ½	1 1	1 ½	½ 0	7½	2782
3	Alexander Morozevich (Russia)	2741	0 ½	0 ½		½ ½	½ 1	½ 1	0 1	½ 1	7½	2775
4	Levon Aronian (Armenia)	2744	1 ½	½ ½	½ ½		½ ½	0 ½	½ ½	½ ½	7	2745
5	Peter Svidler (Russia)	2728	½ ½	½ ½	½ 0	½ ½		½ ½	½ ½	½ 1	7	2748
6	Vasyl Ivanchuk (Ukraine)	2750	½ ½	0 0	½ 0	1 ½	½ ½		1 ½	½ ½	6½	2715
7	Veselin Topalov (Bulgaria)	2783	½ ½	0 ½	1 0	½ ½	½ ½	0 ½		½ ½	6	2690
8	Peter Leko (Hungary)	2749	0 ½	½ 1	½ 0	½ ½	½ 0	½ ½	½ ½		6	2695

==== 2008 ====
XXV SuperGM Morelia/Linares, 15 February – 7 March 2008, Morelia – Linares, Cat. XXI (2756)
	Player	Rating	1	2	3	4	5	6	7	8	Total	TPR
1	Viswanathan Anand (India)	2799		1 ½	½ ½	0 ½	½ ½	½ ½	1 ½	1 1	8½	2829
2	Magnus Carlsen (Norway)	2733	0 ½		1 1	1 ½	0 ½	½ 1	½ 0	½ 1	8	2808
3	Veselin Topalov (Bulgaria)	2780	½ ½	0 0		1 0	½ ½	1 ½	1 1	0 1	7½	2781
4	Levon Aronian (Armenia)	2739	1 ½	0 ½	0 1		½ ½	1 ½	½ ½	½ ½	7½	2787
5	Teimour Radjabov (Azerbaijan)	2735	½ ½	1 ½	½ ½	½ ½		½ ½	0 ½	0 1	7	2758
6	Vasyl Ivanchuk (Ukraine)	2751	½ ½	½ 0	0 ½	0 ½	½ ½		1 1	½ ½	6½	2727
7	Peter Leko (Hungary)	2753	0 ½	½ 1	0 0	½ ½	1 ½	0 0		½ ½	5½	2676
8	Alexei Shirov (Spain)	2755	0 0	½ 0	1 0	½ ½	1 0	½ ½	½ ½		5½	2675

(Costa Rica) GM Alejandro Ramírez (2509) won the III Morelia Open tournament.

==== 2009 ====
XXVI Ciudad de Linares, 19 February – 7 March 2009, Linares, Jaén, Spain, Category XXI (2756)
	Player	Rating	1	2	3	4	5	6	7	8	Total	Wins	TPR
1	Alexander Grischuk (Russia)	2733		½ ½	½ 0	½ ½	1 ½	1 ½	1 ½	½ ½	8	3	2809
2	Vasyl Ivanchuk (Ukraine)	2779	½ ½		½ ½	½ ½	½ ½	½ ½	1 1	½ ½	8	2	2802
3	Magnus Carlsen (Norway)	2776	½ 1	½ ½		1 ½	½ ½	½ 0	½ 0	½ 1	7½		2781
4	Viswanathan Anand (India)	2791	½ ½	½ ½	0 ½		1 ½	1 ½	0 ½	½ ½	7		2750
5	Teimour Radjabov (Azerbaijan)	2761	0 ½	½ ½	½ ½	0 ½		½ ½	½ 1	½ ½	6½		2726
6	Wang Yue (China)	2739	0 ½	½ ½	½ 1	0 ½	½ ½		½ ½	½ ½	6½		2729
7	Levon Aronian (Armenia)	2750	0 ½	0 0	½ 1	1 ½	½ 0	½ ½		1 ½	6½		2727
8	Leinier Domínguez (Cuba)	2717	½ ½	½ ½	½ 0	½ ½	½ ½	½ ½	0 ½		6		2711

=== 2010 ===
XXVII Ciudad de Linares, 13–24 February 2010, Linares, Jaén, Spain, Category XXI (2758)
	Player	Rating	1	2	3	4	5	6	Total	TB	TPR
1	Veselin Topalov (Bulgaria)	2805		1 0	½ ½	1 ½	½ 1	½ 1	6½		2858
2	Alexander Grischuk (Russia)	2736	0 1		½ ½	½ 1	1 ½	½ ½	6		2834
3	Levon Aronian (Armenia)	2781	½ ½	½ ½		½ 1	½ ½	½ ½	5½		2789
4	Vugar Gashimov (Azerbaijan)	2759	0 ½	½ 0	½ 0		½ ½	1 ½	4	2.5	2685
5	Boris Gelfand (Israel)	2761	½ 0	0 ½	½ ½	½ ½		½ ½	4	2.0	2685
6	Francisco Vallejo Pons (Spain)	2705	½ 0	½ ½	½ ½	0 ½	½ ½		4	1.5	2696
