= Wang Tongsen =

Chinese chess player (born 1997)

Personal information
- Born: 1997 (age 28–29) Qingdao, Shandong, China

Chess career
- Country: China
- FIDE rating: 2434 (September 2026)
- Peak rating: 2434 (September 2026)

Wang Tongsen (Chinese: 王桐森) is a Chinese chess player.

== Chess career ==
He began learning chess at the age of 5, and trained alongside future-grandmaster Bu Xiangzhi under Tong Yuanming.

In November 2007, he won the U10 section of the World Youth Chess Championship.

In April 2017, Wang finished tied for second at the Shanghai Haiwan Cup with Liu Yan and Peng Xiongjian.

In October 2019, he won the National College Championships.

He is a coach at chess academy Chesstopia, and has also coached the Qingdao Youth Chess Team.

== Personal life ==
He studied at Shanghai University of Finance and Economics.
