= Vaibhav Suri =

Indian chess grandmaster (born 1997)

Personal information
- Born: 8 February 1997 (age 29) New Delhi, India

Chess career
- Country: India
- Title: Grandmaster (2012)
- FIDE rating: 2569 (July 2026)
- Peak rating: 2610 (October 2022)

Vaibhav Suri (born 8 February 1997) is an Indian chess grandmaster.

== Early life and education ==
Vaibhav studied at the Modern School and joined the Shri Ram College of Commerce, graduating in 2018.

== Career ==
In 2012, Vaibhav earned his final grandmaster norm. At the age of fifteen, he became one of the youngest grandmasters.

Vaibhav won a bronze medal at the 2017 Asian Indoor and Martial Arts Games, teamed with Diptayan Ghosh.

In 2018, he won the Biel Chess Festival in the masters category, winning five games and drawing four.

In 2026, Vaibhav served as a second to Indian grandmaster R Praggnanandhaa during his winning campaign at the Norway Chess tournament, where Praggnanandhaa became the first Indian player to win the event.
