= John Daniel Bryant =

American chess player (born 1991)

Personal information
- Born: December 28, 1991 (age 34) Bakersfield, California, U.S.

Chess career
- Country: United States
- Title: International Master (2013)
- FIDE rating: 2419 (October 2026)
- Peak rating: 2470 (January 2017)

John Daniel Bryant (born December 28, 1991) is an American chess player.

== Chess career ==
In August 2012, he tied for first place with grandmasters Manuel León Hoyos and Dmitry Gurevich in the U.S. Open Chess Championship.

In January 2019, he won the 10th Annual Golden State Open held in Concord, California.

In August 2019, he tied for first place with grandmaster Enrico Sevillano and Rachael Li in the Central California Open, also having the best tiebreak score.

In January 2020, he finished in second place in the Dreaming King Open, a half-point behind winner Robert Shlyakhtenko.
