= Srihari L. R. =

Indian chess grandmaster (born 2005)

Personal information
- Born: November 24, 2005 (age 20) Chennai, Tamil Nadu, India

Chess career
- Country: India
- Title: Grandmaster (2025)
- FIDE rating: 2453 (July 2026)
- Peak rating: 2503 (September 2024)

Srihari L. Ravi is an Indian chess grandmaster.

== Career ==
Srihari was coached by grandmaster Shyam Sundar M. at his chess academy Chess Thulir, who has also coached grandmaster Pranav V.

In May 2025, he became India's 86th grandmaster at the Asian Individual Chess Championship after a draw against Pranesh M in the penultimate round.

== Personal life ==
He studies commerce at the SRM Institute of Science and Technology, during which he won the Chennai Open International Grandmaster's Chess Championship.
