= Jaan Eslon =

Estonian-Swedish chess player

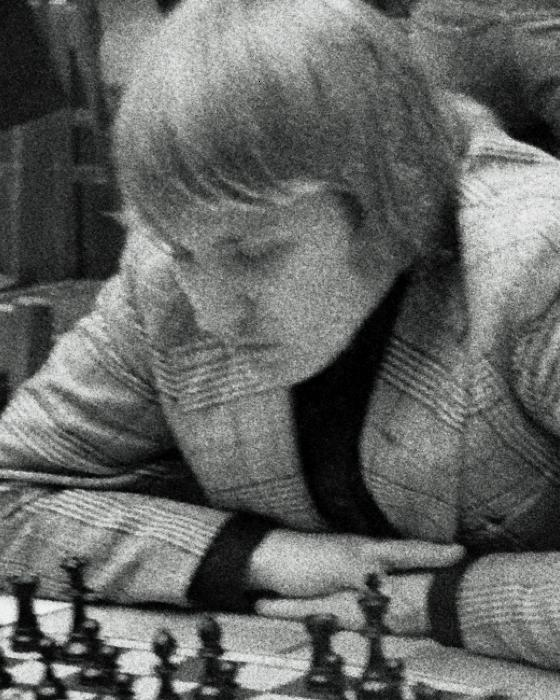
Jaan Eslon in 1972

Jaan Eslon (4 March 1952 – 24 September 2000) was an Estonian-Swedish chess player.

He was born in Falköping, Sweden. His family had fled Estonia to Sweden during World War II.

He began his chess career in 1966. In 1969 he become the junior champion of Sweden. In 1977 was awarded the International Master title and moved to Spain. In 1978 he won Linares International Chess Tournament. 1980–1983 he won San Sebastian Tournament. He has won also several international tournaments. In 1989 he participated on Paul Keres Memorial Tournament.

In the mid-1980s, he was an editor of the chess section of the Estonian language newspaper Eesti Päevaleht published in Stockholm. He died in Las Palmas, Canary Islands, in 2000.
