= Shyam Sundar M. =

Indian chess grandmaster (born 1992)

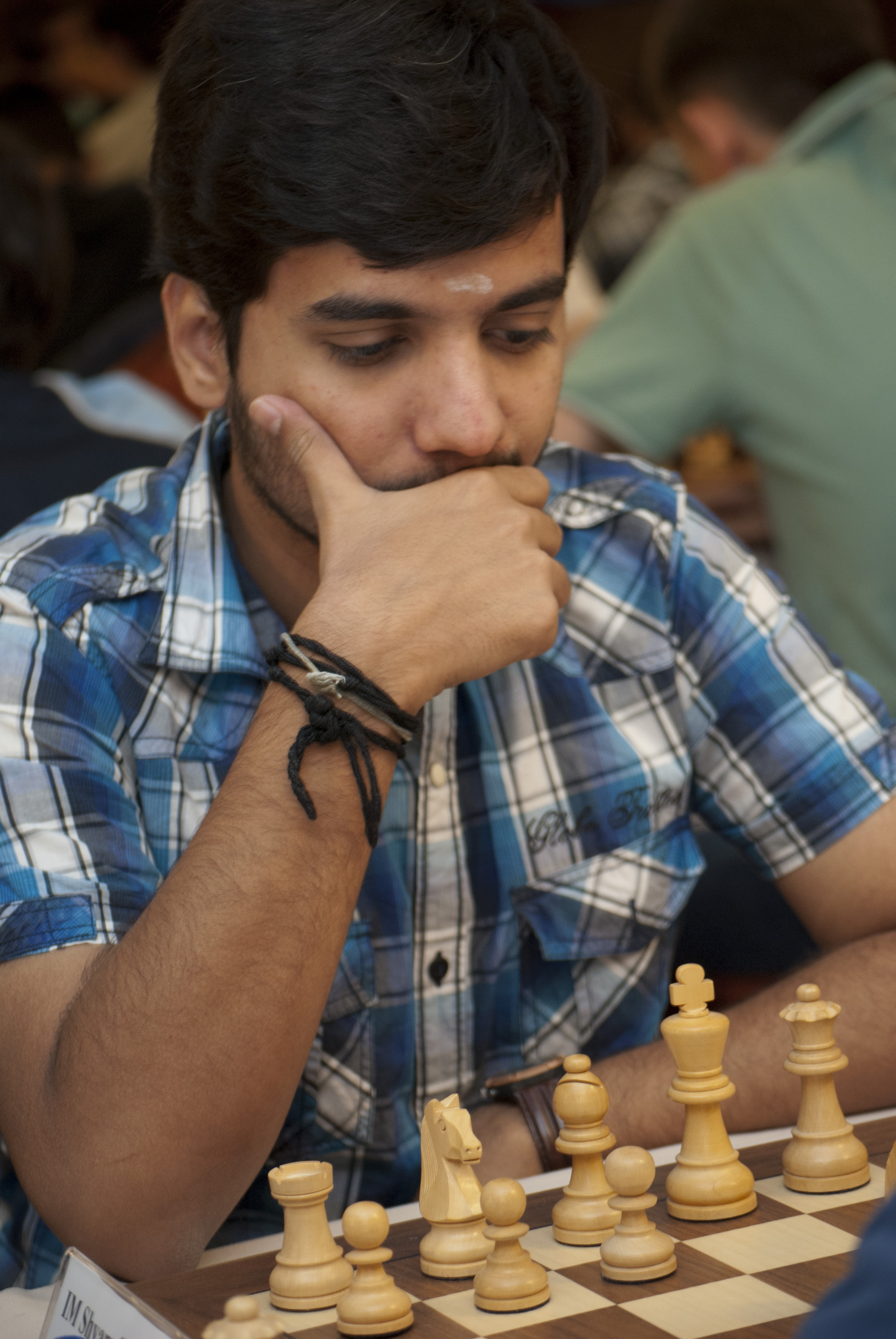
- Shyam Sundar in 2012

Personal information
- Born: 28 May 1992 (age 34) Vellore, India

Chess career
- Country: India
- Title: Grandmaster (2013)
- FIDE rating: 2478 (July 2026)
- Peak rating: 2554 (February 2017)

Shyam Sundar Mohanraj is an Indian chess grandmaster. He is a national coach for India, and many of his students have become grandmasters, such as Pranav V, Srihari L. R., and Harikrishnan A Ra.

== Career ==
In April 2012, he caused an upset by defeating Liviu-Dieter Nisipeanu in the Dubai Open.

In December 2015, he and Jorden van Foreest tied for first in the Groningen Open with a score of 7.5/9. He lost the title to van Foreest on tiebreaks.

In March 2024, he and Jachym Nemek tied for first place with a score of 6.5/7 in the Prague International Chess Festival 2024 H Rapid Open. Shyam won the event due to better tiebreaks.
