= Zhao Yuanhe =

Chinese chess grandmaster (born 2000)

Personal information
- Born: November 27, 2000 (age 25) Harbin, China

Chess career
- Country: China
- Title: Grandmaster (2026)
- FIDE rating: 2439 (September 2026)
- Peak rating: 2501 (August 2024)

Zhao Yuanhe (Chinese: 赵元赫) is a Chinese chess grandmaster.

== Chess career ==
In December 2023, he tied for second place with three other players in the Hong Kong International Open. He was ranked in 4th place after tiebreaks.

In March 2025, he was a joint leader after the fifth round of the Karel Janeček Open section of the Prague International Chess Festival. He ultimately finished with a score of 6/9.

In March 2026, he played in the Prague International Open, where he scored 6/9 and finished in 35th out of 357 players.

He achieved the Grandmaster title in 2026 after earning his norms at the:

- Third Saturday Djenovici in February 2019
- Dubai Open in June 2024
- Pilsen Open in March 2025
