= Kim Steven Yap =

Filipino chess player (born 1988)

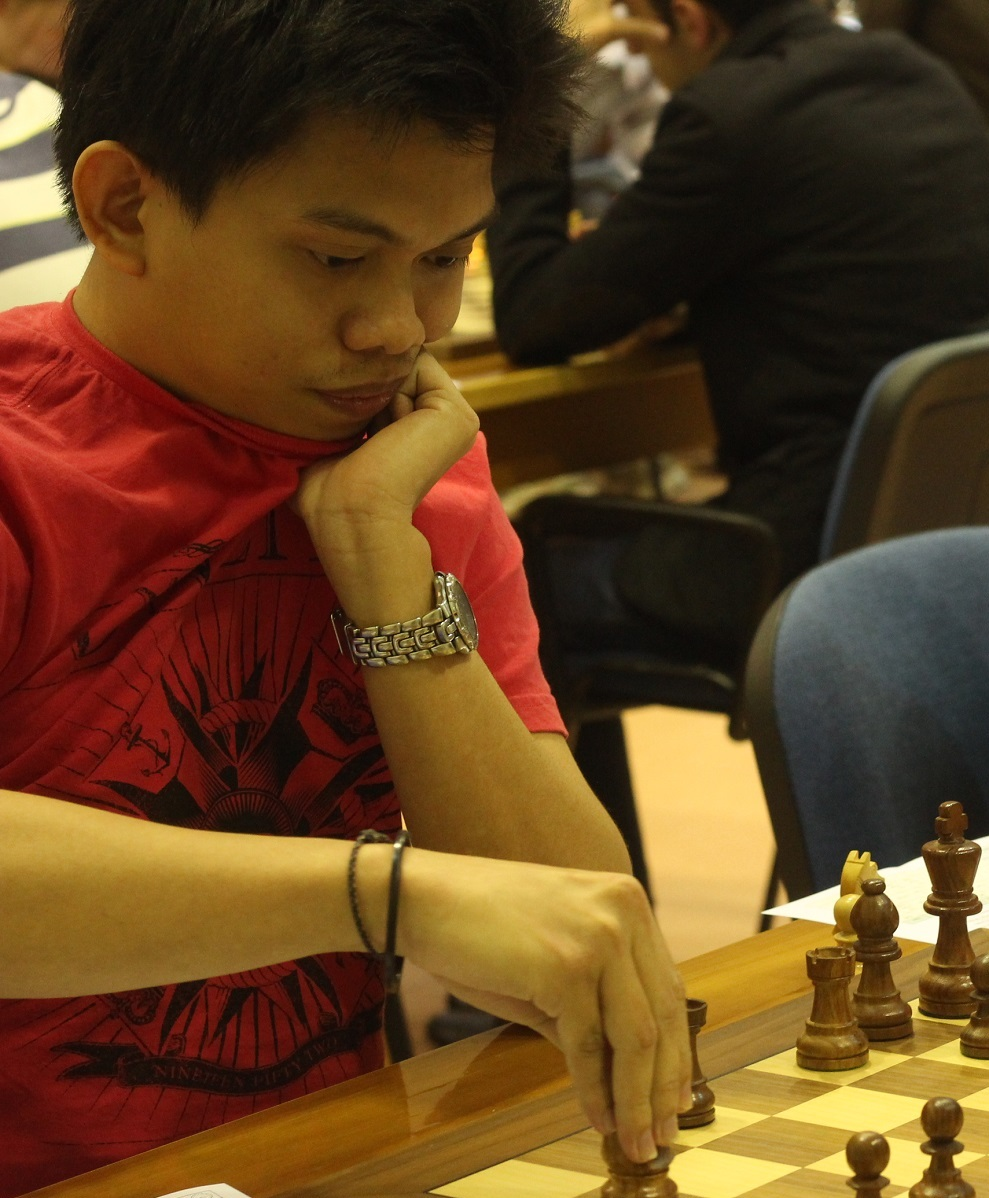
- Yap at Dubai Open Chess Tournament 2013

Personal information
- Born: May 21, 1988 (age 38) Cebu City, Philippines

Chess career
- Country: Philippines
- Title: International Master (2009)
- Peak rating: 2442 (July 2014)

Kim Steven Ruelan Yap (born May 21, 1988) is a Filipino chess player. He holds the FIDE title of International Master (IM).

== Early life ==
Yap was recognised as a prodigy from Cebu. He is a grandson of Marcelo "Loloy" Ruelan, Cebu's first National Master who was Philippine Open champion in 1959. His father, Lincoln, is an International Arbiter. Lincoln was a varsity player of the University of the Visayas who is now based in Singapore as an instructor at Intchess Asia. His mother, Mona, played for the University of San Carlos. He is the nephew of IM Rico Mascariñas and FIDE Arbiter Marvin Ruelan.

== Career ==
Yap tied for second and third place behind champion Wesley So in the 2007 National Junior Chess Championship. So, who now plays for the United States and reached as high as number two in the world rankings, has been unsuccessful against Yap, losing their three personal encounters.

His IM title was confirmed during the FIDE Presidential Board meeting in Istanbul, Turkey in March 2009.

Yap won an individual gold medal as the top Board 2 player in the 2014 Asian Club Team Chess League in Al Ain, UAE. His performance helped Tagaytay Chess Club capture the silver medal. He defeated three grandmasters in the tournament, Krishnan Sasikiran (rated 2669), Reefat Bin-Sattar (2449) and Petr Kostenko (2484), for a 2679 performance rating.

Yap is coach and trainer of the University of Cebu chess team and was a trainer at the Asean Chess Academy in Singapore. He founded the Cebu School of Chess in 2014. Yap signed a memorandum of agreement on May 29, 2015, with Dr. Marie Ernestine Fajatin, the school founder, and Therese dela Torre of Cebu Chess Masters for Marie Ernestine School Philippine Robotics Academy to be the first private school in the Philippines to include chess into its K-12 curriculum.

Yap earned his first chess grandmaster norm after placing second in the Berkeley Chess School 2018 Summer IM/GM Norm Tournament in Berkeley, California.
