= Xiao Tong (chess player) =

Chinese chess grandmaster (born 2008)

Personal information
- Born: November 20, 2008 (age 17) Qingdao, China

Chess career
- Country: China
- Title: Grandmaster (2024)
- FIDE rating: 2599 (July 2026)
- Peak rating: 2599 (July 2026)

Xiao Tong (Chinese: 肖同; pinyin: Xiào Tóng; born November 20, 2008) is a Chinese chess grandmaster. He holds the distinction of being the fifth-youngest GM in Chinese history and the first player born in 2008 worldwide to achieve the GM title.

== Career ==
In July 2023, Xiao finished tied for first in the Orillas de Mar International Open tournament with Abhijeet Gupta, Bu Xiangzhi, Dragoș Cereș, and Liu Yan. He ultimately lost the championship to Gupta after tiebreaks.

Similar to Peng Xiongjian and Wang Hao, Xiao became a grandmaster without first gaining the International Master title. He achieved his GM norms at the:

- I Torneo Internacional Orillas de Mar in July 2023
  - His win against grandmaster Hannes Stefánsson in this event was named as the "game of the week" by the Arona Chess Club
- XLII Open Intl Villa de Benasque in July 2023
- SixDays Budapest One Year 2023 GM-B in September 2023

In July 2024, he won the Biel Chess Festival Swiss Rapid Fischer Random Championship 2024 with an undefeated score of 6.5/7.

In August 2024, his Grandmaster title was formally approved, making him the world's seventh-youngest grandmaster at the time of his title formalization.

In July 2025, he won the Chinese Chess Championship at Xinghua with an undefeated score of 8/11.
