= Harikrishnan A Ra =

Indian chess grandmaster (born 2001)

Personal information
- Born: September 22, 2001 (age 24) Chennai, India

Chess career
- Country: India
- Title: Grandmaster (2025)
- FIDE rating: 2519 (July 2026)
- Peak rating: 2536 (November 2025)

Harikrishnan Amirthavalli Rangarajan is an Indian chess grandmaster. He is coached by grandmaster Shyam Sundar M.

== Chess career ==
In April 2024, he won the Noisiel Blitz Rating Open with a perfect score of 9/9. He also finished with an unbeaten 7/9 score in the >1900 Open A event, finishing in third place after tiebreaks behind Li Min Peng and Marco Materia.

In May 2024, he tied for first with grandmaster Abdulla Gadimbayli in the Ljubljana Chess Festival with a score of 7.5/9, losing in the tiebreaks and being ranked in second place.

In July 2025, he became India's 87th Grandmaster after a draw against grandmaster P. Iniyan in the final game of the La Plagne International Chess Festival.
