= Zhao Jun =

Zhao Jun is the name of:

- Zhao Jun (diplomat) (born 1954), Chinese diplomat
- Zhao Jun (chess player) (born 1986), Chinese chess player
- Zhao Jun (footballer, born 1988), Chinese association footballer
- Zhao Jun (skier) (born 1967), Chinese Olympic skier
