= Aryan Chopra =

Indian chess grandmaster (born 2001)

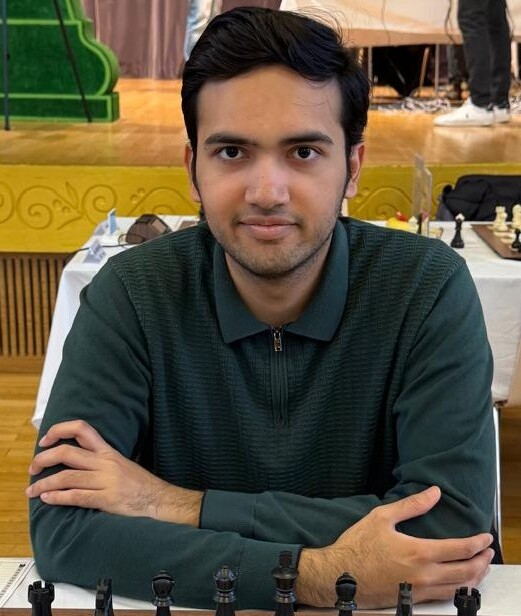
- Chopra in 2025 French League

Personal information
- Born: 10 December 2001 (age 24) New Delhi, India

Chess career
- Country: India
- Title: Grandmaster (2016)
- FIDE rating: 2646 (October 2026)
- Peak rating: 2646 (September 2026)
- Ranking: No. 72 (October 2026)
- Peak ranking: No. 70 (September 2026)

Aryan Chopra (born 10 December 2001) is an Indian chess prodigy who became a grandmaster (GM) in 2016, at the age of 14 years, 9 months and 3 days. The title was officially awarded by FIDE in 2017. He became the second youngest Indian to become Grandmaster, after Parimarjan Negi.

== Chess career ==
Chopra began playing chess at the age of six after an accident left him temporarily house-bound.

=== Before 2020 ===
Chopra achieved his first grandmaster norm at the 2015 Riga Technical University Open where he remained unbeaten. He earned his second GM norm at the 35th Zalakaros Open in May 2016 by putting up a strong performance and defeating multiple grandmasters. Chopra earned his third and final GM norm on 29 August 2016 when he defeated GM Samvel Ter-Sahakyan of Armenia with black pieces in the final round of the Abu Dhabi Chess Championship Masters Tournament . He was officially awarded the title in March 2017.

He was a part of the world team that convincingly beat the US team 30.5-17.5 in the 2017 Match of the Millennials held in St. Louis. He played in the under-17 section and scored 3.5/6 to help the world team win the section 19–13.

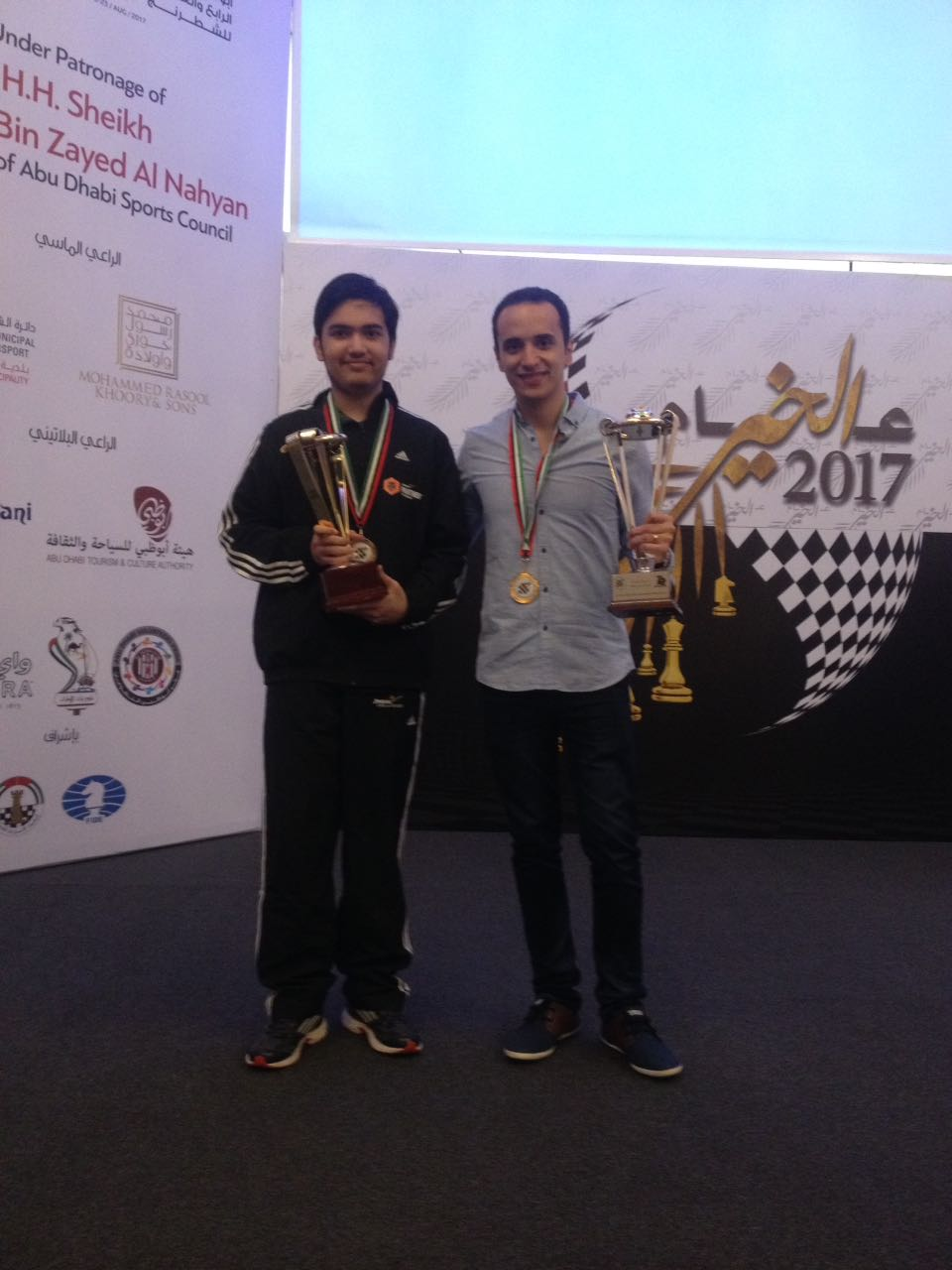
Chopra(L) with Amin Bassem at the 2017 Abu Dhabi Masters

Chopra finished third in the 2017 Abu Dhabi Chess Masters tournament, behind winner Amin Bassem and runner-up Nigel Short. He beat multiple grandmasters and gained 22 elo points on his way to scoring 6.5/9 points. He ended the tournament with a notable victory over GM Levan Pantsulaia of Georgia with black pieces.

In 2018, he was part of the Indian team that won the IND-CHN Summit match.

=== 2020 - Present ===
Aryan finished 11th in the Gibraltar Open Chess Tournament in 2020, with a 2709 rating performance.

In 2022, he finished Fagernes with 7 points out of 9, tied for first with Krishnan Sasikiran. He ended up placing 2nd on tie-breakers. He was the runner-up at Menorca Open behind Gukesh and he also placed second at the Serbia Masters with a rating performance of 2730.

In 2023, he tied for first at Menorca Open with 7/9 points, but finished 4th on tie-break. He followed that up with a runner-up finish at Biel Masters 2023, behind Bu Xiangzhi.

He finished 5th at Menorca Open 2024, with a rating performance of 2733. He was a part of the Romanian League winning Vados Arad team in 2024, and won the individual gold for his board (board 2) as well. His Vados Arad team also won the bronze medal in the European Club Cup in 2024.

He finished as a runner-up behind Alexey Sarana in the 2025 Aktobe Open.
