= Pang Tao =

Chinese chess grandmaster (born 2001)

Personal information
- Born: February 20, 2001 (age 25) Qingdao, Shandong, China

Chess career
- Country: China
- Title: Grandmaster (2025)
- FIDE rating: 2444 (September 2026)
- Peak rating: 2501 (March 2024)

Pang Tao (Chinese: 逄韬) is a Chinese chess grandmaster.

== Career ==
In November 2024, he tied for second place with Chen Zimu, Cao Qingfeng, and Chen Yuan in the Rebecca Cup in Nanjing, finishing behind winner Huang Renjie.

In May 2025, he played in the Sharjah Masters, where he achieved wins against grandmasters Jakhongir Vakhidov and Varuzhan Akobian. Afterwards, he achieved his final GM norm and earned the Grandmaster title.

He was awarded the Grandmaster title in August 2025, after achieving his norms at the:

- SixDays Budapest GM B tournament in January 2024
- GM RR Third Saturday Novi Sad tournament in February 2024
- Sharjah Masters in May 2025
