= Xue Haowen =

Chinese chess grandmaster (born 2008)

Xue Haowen 薛皓文
Personal information
- Born: November 2008 (age 17) Shenzhen, Guangdong

Chess career
- Country: China
- Title: Grandmaster (2025)
- FIDE rating: 2553 (July 2026)
- Peak rating: 2556 (August 2026)

Xue Haowen (Chinese: 薛皓文; pinyin: Xuē Hàowén; born 2008) is a Chinese chess grandmaster. Prior to holding any FIDE titles, he defeated multiple Grandmasters, gaining attention when he (as an untitled player) defeated Hans Niemann at the 2023 Dubai Open Chess Tournament in an upset with the black pieces.

== Chess career ==
=== 2021 ===
Xue participated in the FIDE Online Chess Olympiad 2021 as part of the host Shenzhen team. Originally part of Division 2, it advanced to the pool B of the top division where it came fourth, making it a top 16 team.

=== 2023 ===
In August, Xue was part of the China team that participated in the 2023 FIDE World Youth U16 Olympiad held in Eindhoven. His team won and Xue personally scored 7 points on board 1 by winning 5 games and drawing 4 with no losses.

In June, Xue participated in the 2023 Dubai Open Chess Tournament where he came eighth overall with a performance rating of 2709 where he defeated four grandmasters: Artem Chernobay, David Gavrilescu, Mikheil Mchedlishvili and Hans Niemann.

In December, Xue participated in the World Rapid Chess Championship 2023 coming 91st. His strongest games during the tournament were defeating Jan-Krzysztof Duda and Aravindh Chithambaram with the black pieces. He also participated in the World Blitz Chess Championship 2023 with less success, placing 177th.

=== 2024 ===
In April, Xue came fourth in the Hua Yi Cup Chinese Chess Rapid Tournament. He defeated Bu Xiangzhi and Li Chao to reach the semifinals but was defeated by Wei Yi and then Yu Yangyi.

In July, Xue won the Arona Open in Tenerife with 8 points from 10 games and an Elo performance of 2677.

=== 2025 ===
In January, Xue won the Hastings International Chess Congress with 7 points from 9 games and an Elo performance of 2645. He broke Judit Polgar's record as the youngest winner. This marked his final GM norm, and since he had previously surpassed the 2500 rating mark, qualified him to become a Grandmaster.

=== 2026 ===
In July 2026, Xue won the 54th World Open.

== Personal life ==
Xue grew up in Shenzhen and started playing chess when he was six years old. His chess coach is Zeng Chongsheng.

He currently attends Shenzhen College of International Education.
