= Peng Xiongjian =

Chinese chess grandmaster (born 2000)

Personal information
- Born: May 2000 (age 26) Panzhihua, China

Chess career
- Country: China
- Title: Grandmaster (2023)
- FIDE rating: 2520 (September 2026)
- Peak rating: 2526 (January 2026)

Peng Xiongjian (Chinese: 彭雄健; born May 2000) is a Chinese chess grandmaster.

== Career ==
Peng began playing chess at the age of 8. He moved from his hometown of Panzhihua to Chongqing at age 11 to concentrate on chess.

Similar to Gata Kamsky and Wang Hao, Peng became a grandmaster without first gaining the International Master title. He achieved his GM norms at the:

- Hainan International Open in December 2016
- GM Round Robin, Orbis in July 2019
- Hunan International Chess Open in August 2019

In December 2016, Peng finished 6th out of a field of 30 players in the Hainan Dhanzhou International Open Tournament, despite being both an untitled player and the 29th seed.

In April 2017, Peng finished tied for second at the Shanghai Haiwan Cup with Liu Yan and Wang Tongsen.

In June 2020, Peng finished 5th at the Asian Juniors Online Chess Championship.

In July 2023, Peng finished 4th at the 56th Biel MTO Chess Festival and earned an IM norm after drawing against Bu Xiangzhi in the final round.

== Personal life ==
He is studying at Shenzhen University.
