= Liu Yan (chess player) =

Chinese chess grandmaster (born 2000)

Personal information
- Born: March 29, 2000 (age 26) Chongqing, China

Chess career
- Country: China
- Title: Grandmaster (2018)
- FIDE rating: 2516 (July 2026)
- Peak rating: 2579 (August 2023)

Liu Yan (Chinese: 刘言; born March 29, 2000) is a Chinese chess grandmaster.

== Chess career ==
In September 2014, Liu won the Under-14 section of the World Youth Chess Championship held in Durban, South Africa.

In August 2020, Liu played for China in the FIDE Online Chess Olympiad 2020 alongside Ding Liren, Yu Yangyi, Hou Yifan, Ju Wenjun, and Zhu Jiner.

In July 2023, Liu finished tied for first in the Orillas de Mar International Open tournament with Abhijeet Gupta, Bu Xiangzhi, Dragoș Cereș, and Xiao Tong. He ultimately finished as runner-up to Gupta after tiebreaks. He then finished third in the 56th Biel Master Open tournament, behind Bu Xiangzhi and Aryan Chopra.
