= Chess in India =

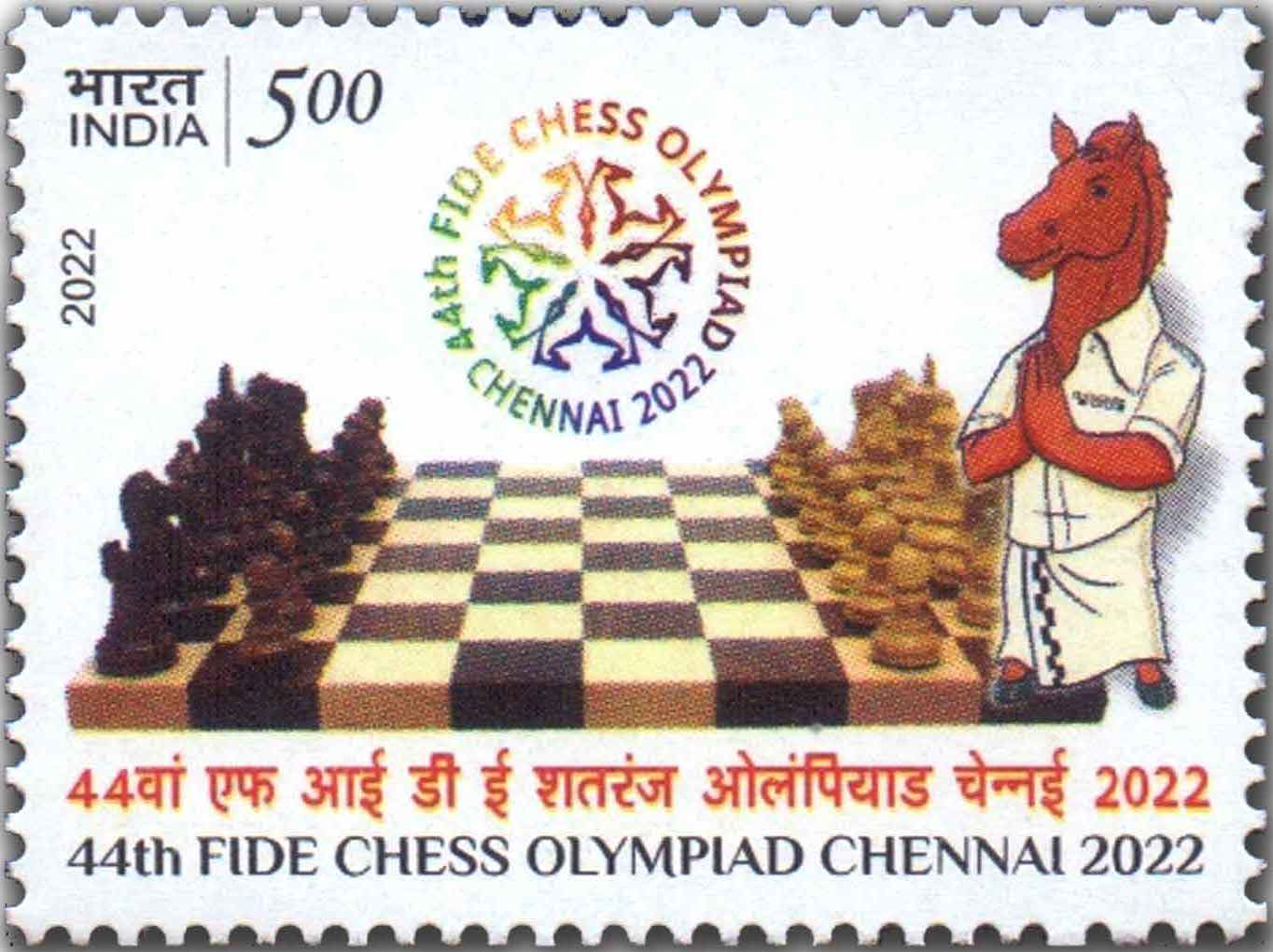
Stamp depicting the 44th Chess Olympiad, the first hosted by India, in Chennai.

Chess has a deep-rooted history in India, widely believed to have originated from the game of chaturanga during the Gupta Empire in circa 6th century CE. Over centuries, it evolved and spread across the world, influencing modern chess as we know it today.

In the contemporary era, India has emerged as a major chess power, excelling in international tournaments and the country currently has the second best federation in the world with a 2712 top-ten rating. The country holds multiple Chess Olympiad victories in both the men's and women's sections and has crowned two World Chess Champions: Viswanathan Anand, a five-time champion who revolutionized Indian chess, and Gukesh Dommaraju, the current reigning champion.

The rise of chess in modern India is often credited to Anand, whose dominance from the late 1990s to the early 2010s inspired a generation of players. His success, coupled with the growth of digital platforms and widespread grassroots training programs, has fueled a chess boom, making India one of the leading nations in the sport. The country now has a robust chess ecosystem, supported by the All India Chess Federation (AICF) and a network of state associations, academies, and online communities.

== Early history ==
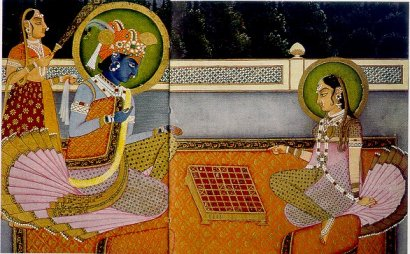
Hindu deity Krishna and Radha playing chaturanga, which laid the foundation for modern chess

Chess originated in India with its earliest known form, chaturanga, dating back roughly 1,500 years to the 6th century, during the Gupta Empire. Chaturanga is considered the earliest precursor to modern chess because it had key features that would appear in later variations: different pieces possessing different powers and victory depending on the fate of one piece, the king.

As trade and cultural exchanges flourished along the Silk Road, Chaturanga spread to Persia, where it evolved into Shatranj. The game underwent further refinements in the Islamic world and medieval Europe, ultimately transforming into the modern chess we recognize today.

== Modern history ==
Modern chess in India began officially with the formation of All India Chess Federation in 1951. This was soon followed by the first Indian Chess Championship, held in Eluru, Andhra Pradesh. In 1956, India made its debut at the 12th Chess Olympiad in Moscow. Then, Manuel Aaron achieved the feat as the first Indian to become an International Master, in 1961.

In 1977, Rohini Khadilkar became the first female player to compete in the Indian Chess Championship. Some players objected to her being in the tournament because she was female. Her father wrote to the World Chess Federation president, Max Euwe, and Euwe ruled that female players could not be barred from open chess events.

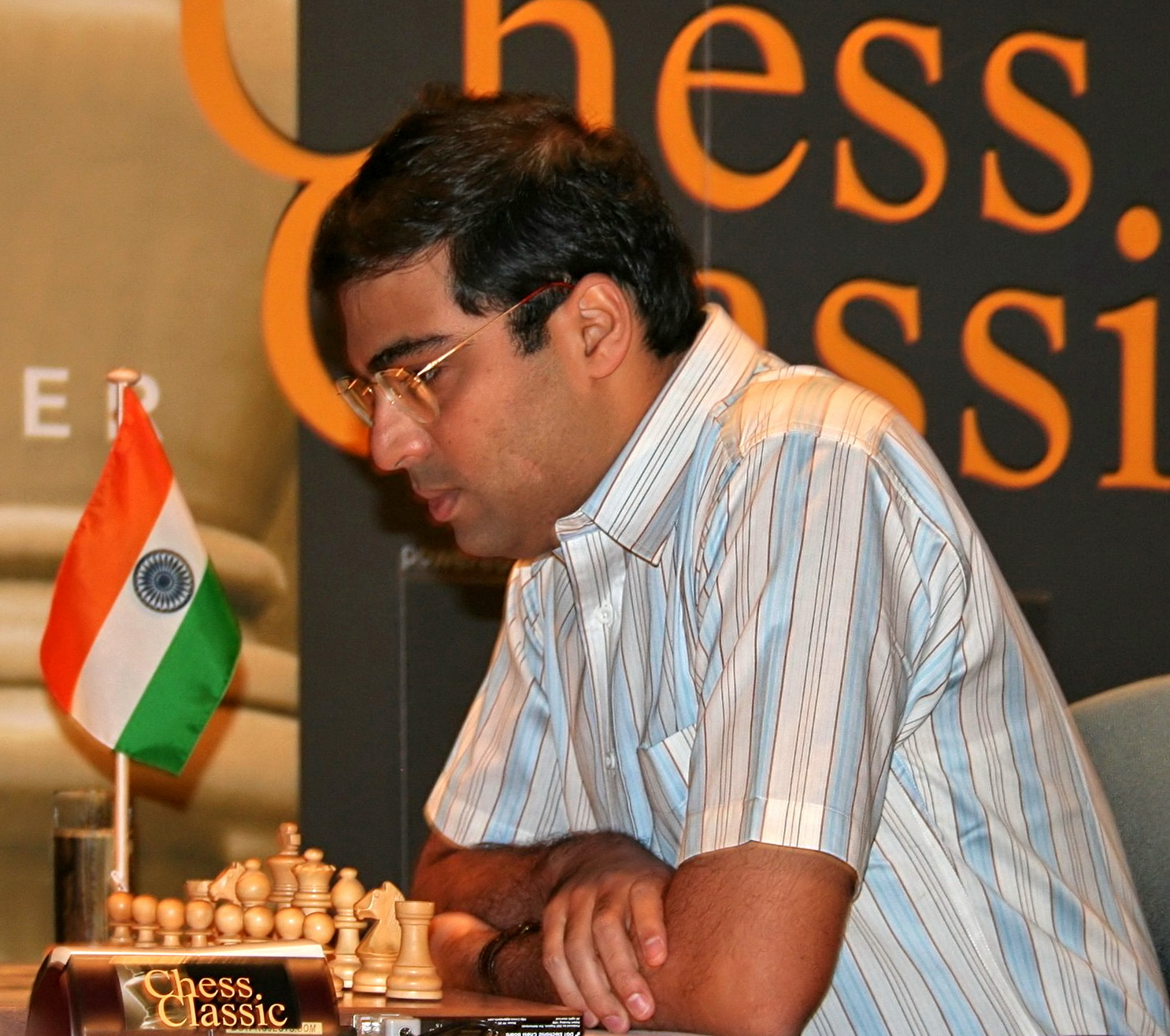
Former World Champion Vishwanathan Anand is credited with popularizing chess in modern India.

In 1988, 19-year old Viswanathan Anand of Chennai became India's first Grandmaster. He then embarked on a journey to become the first Indian to qualify for the Candidates Tournament, win the Candidates in 1995, 1998 and then finally become the World Champion in 2000 by beating Spain's Alexei Shirov. He would go on to defend the title for more than a decade, until he lost the Championship to Magnus Carlsen in 2013. In 1997, the All India Chess Federation for the Blind was formed with the intention of promoting chess amongst the country's visually impaired people.

Subbaraman Vijayalaksmi became the country's first Woman International Master in 1996. She then became India's first Woman Grandmaster in 2001. Soon, in 2002 Koneru Humpy became the youngest female player ever, and the first Indian female player, to achieve the title of Grandmaster, aged 15 years, 1 month, 27 days, a record only since surpassed by Hou Yifan. India's first Chess Olympiad medal was a bronze in 2014. In 2022, India won bronze medals in the Open and Women category in the first Chess Olympiad hosted by India at Chennai. The nation's first Olympiad gold was then clenched in both categories at the 45th Chess Olympiad in Budapest.

In 2024, Gukesh D made history by becoming the youngest player to win the Candidates Tournament, subsequently clinching the World Chess Championship title with a narrow one-point victory over Ding Liren.

As of December 2024, India boasts 85 chess grandmasters, with 13 ranked among the world's top 100 players. The country has over 30,000 rated players actively participating in officially sanctioned tournaments nationwide. This robust participation has solidified India's status as a chess superpower, with its top 10 players achieving an average Elo rating of 2721, ranking second globally.

== Current rankings ==
=== Open ===
As per FIDE's September 2026 rankings.

#	Title	Player	World Rank	Rating	Age
1	GM	R Praggnanandhaa	1	2761	21 years, 101 days
2	GM	Arjun Erigaisi	2	2759	23 years, 77 days
3	GM	Viswanathan Anand	3	2739	56 years, 343 days
4	GM	Nihal Sarin	4	2718	22 years, 129 days
5	GM	Gukesh Dommaraju	5	2703	20 years, 174 days
6	GM	Vidit Gujrathi	6	2697	32 years, 26 days
7	GM	Pranav Venkatesh	7	2677	21 years, 37 days
8	GM	Aravindh Chithambaram	8	2677	27 years, 69 days
9	GM	Pranesh M	9	2674	20 years, 85 days
10	GM	Pentala Harikrishna	10	2648	40 years, 193 days

=== Women ===
As per FIDE's December 2025 rankings.

#	Title	Player	World Rank	Rating	Age
1	GM	Humpy Koneru	5	2535	39 years, 233 days
2	GM	Divya Deshmukh	12	2497	20 years, 345 days
3	GM	Vaishali Rameshbabu	17	2473	25 years, 151 days
4	GM	Harika Dronavalli	19	2466	35 years, 311 days
5	WGM	Rakshitta Ravi	62	2381	40 years, 91 days
6	IM	Vantika Agrawal	71	2369	24 years, 52 days
7	IM	Padmini Rout	87	2354	32 years, 318 days
8	IM	Savitha Shri B	100+	2334	34 years, 184 days
9	IM	Bhakti Kulkarni	100+	2316	34 years, 184 days
10	IM	Subbaraman Vijayalakshmi	100+	2311	47 years, 239 days

== National and international records ==
- First National Champion: Ramchandra Sapre (1955)
- First Indian International Master: Manuel Aaron (1961)
- First Indian Grandmaster: Viswanathan Anand (1988)
- First Indian Woman Grandmaster: Subbaraman Vijayalakshmi (2001)
- First Indian participation in a Chess Olympiad: 1956, 12th Chess Olympiad at Moscow
- First Blind Chess Olympiad hosted by India: 2012, 14th Blind Chess Olympiad in Chennai
- First Indian Asian Senior Chess Champion: Wazeer Ahmad Khan, 6th Asian Seniors at Lar in 2015
- First Chess Olympiad hosted in India: 2022, 44th Chess Olympiad in Chennai
- Maximum number of Indian National Championship wins: 9 by Manuel Aaron
- Maximum number of Indian National Championship (Women) wins: 6 by Subbaraman Vijayalakshmi
- Maximum number of Indian National Championship (Blind) wins: 6 by Kishan Gangolli
- Youngest Indian Grandmaster: Gukesh D at the age of 12 (2018)
- Youngest winner of the Candidates Tournament: Gukesh D at the age of 17 (2024)
- Youngest World Champion: Gukesh D at the age of 18 (2024)
- Rameshbabu Praggnanandhaa and his sister Vaishali are the first brother-sister duo to earn GM titles and to qualify for the Candidates Tournament

== Medal table ==
=== Summary - Team ===
Tournament	Team	1st place, gold medalist(s)	2nd place, silver medalist(s)	3rd place, bronze medalist(s)	Total
Olympiad	M	1	1	2	4
Olympiad	F	1	0	2	3
Olympiad	X	1	0	1	2
World Team Championship	M	0	0	1	1
World Team Championship	F	0	1	0	1
Asian Games	M	0	1	1	2
Asian Games	F	0	1	0	1
Asian Games	X	1	0	0	1
Asian Indoor and Martial Arts Games	M	0	0	3	3
Asian Indoor and Martial Arts Games	F	0	0	1	1
Asian Indoor and Martial Arts Games	X	1	2	2	5
Asian Team Championship	M	3	6	4	13
Asian Team Championship	F	0	5	3	8
World Mind Sports Games	X	0	1	0	1
Total		8	18	20	46

=== Summary - Individual ===
Tournament	Gender	1st place, gold medalist(s)	2nd place, silver medalist(s)	3rd place, bronze medalist(s)	Total
World Championship	M	5	5	0	10
World Championship	F	0	1	6	7
World Rapid; World Blitz	M	2	2	4	8
World Rapid; World Blitz	F	1	2	3	6
World Cup	M	2	1	0	3
World Cup	F	1	1	0	2
Olympiad	M	4	5	2	11
Olympiad	F	4	4	6	14
Asian Games	M	0	0	0	0
Asian Games	F	1	0	1	2
World Team Championship	M	3	0	4	7
World Team Championship	F	2	5	4	11
Asian Team Championship	M	20	15	14	49
Asian Team Championship	F	6	17	10	33
Asian Indoor and Martial Arts Games	M	2	0	2	4
Asian Indoor and Martial Arts Games	F	2	0	2	4
Total		55	58	52	165

- Updated till 31 December 2025

== Olympiad ==
=== Open ===
Medal	Event	Team	Points
3rd place, bronze medalist(s)	2014 Tromsø	Parimarjan Negi; Panayappan Sethuraman; Sasikiran Krishnan; Adhiban Baskaran; Musunuri Rohit Lalit Babu	17
3rd place, bronze medalist(s)	2022 Chennai	Gukesh Dommaraju; Nihal Sarin; Praggnanandhaa Rameshbabu; Adhiban Baskaran; Raunak Sadhwani	18
1st place, gold medalist(s)	2024 Budapest	Gukesh Dommaraju; Praggnanandhaa Rameshbabu; Arjun Erigaisi; Vidit Gujrathi; Pentala Harikrishna	21
2nd place, silver medalist(s)	2026 Samarkand	Praggnanandhaa Rameshbabu; Arjun Erigaisi; Nihal Sarin; Gukesh Dommaraju; Vidit Gujrathi	18

=== Open Individual ===
Medal	Event	Player	Category
2nd place, silver medalist(s)	2004 Calvià	Viswanathan Anand	Best performance rating
2nd place, silver medalist(s)	2012 Istanbul	Abhijeet Gupta	Board 4
2nd place, silver medalist(s)	2014 Tromsø	Sasikiran Krishnan	Board 3
1st place, gold medalist(s)	2022 Chennai	Gukesh Dommaraju	Board 1
1st place, gold medalist(s)	2022 Chennai	Nihal Sarin	Board 2
2nd place, silver medalist(s)	2022 Chennai	Arjun Erigaisi	Board 3
3rd place, bronze medalist(s)	2022 Chennai	Praggnanandhaa Rameshbabu	Board 3
1st place, gold medalist(s)	2024 Budapest	Gukesh Dommaraju	Board 1
1st place, gold medalist(s)	2024 Budapest	Arjun Erigaisi	Board 3
3rd place, bronze medalist(s)	2026 Samarkand	Praggnanandhaa Rameshbabu	Board 3
2nd place, silver medalist(s)	2026 Samarkand	Gukesh Dommaraju	Board 4

=== Women ===
Medal	Event	Team	Points
3rd place, bronze medalist(s)	2022 Chennai	Koneru Humpy; Harika Dronavalli; Vaishali Rameshbabu; Tania Sachdev; Bhakti Kulkarni	17
1st place, gold medalist(s)	2024 Budapest	Harika Dronavalli; Vaishali Rameshbabu; Divya Deshmukh; Vantika Agrawal; Tania Sachdev	19
3rd place, bronze medalist(s)	2026 Samarkand	Koneru Humpy; Vaishali Rameshbabu; Divya Deshmukh; Vantika Agrawal; Savitha Shri Baskar	17

=== Women Individual ===
Medal	Event	Player	Category
2nd place, silver medalist(s)	2000 Istanbul	Subbaraman Vijayalakshmi	Board 1
2nd place, silver medalist(s)	2002 Bled	Subbaraman Vijayalakshmi	Board 1
2nd place, silver medalist(s)	2008 Dresden	Mary Ann Gomes	Board 5
3rd place, bronze medalist(s)	2012 Istanbul	Tania Sachdev	Board 3
1st place, gold medalist(s)	2014 Tromsø	Padmini Rout	Board 5
3rd place, bronze medalist(s)	2022 Chennai	Vaishali Rameshbabu	Board 3
3rd place, bronze medalist(s)	2022 Chennai	Tania Sachdev	Board 4
3rd place, bronze medalist(s)	2022 Chennai	Divya Deshmukh	Board 5
1st place, gold medalist(s)	2024 Budapest	Divya Deshmukh	Board 3
1st place, gold medalist(s)	2024 Budapest	Vantika Agrawal	Board 4
3rd place, bronze medalist(s)	2026 Samarkand	Koneru Humpy	Board 1
2nd place, silver medalist(s)	2026 Samarkand	Divya Deshmukh	Board 3
3rd place, bronze medalist(s)	2026 Samarkand	Vantika Agrawal	Board 4
1st place, gold medalist(s)	2026 Samarkand	Savitha Shri Baskar	Board 5

=== Online ===
Medal	Event	Team
1st place, gold medalist(s)	2020	Viswanathan Anand; Vidit Gujrathi; Koneru Humpy; Harika Dronavalli; Nihal Sarin; Divya Deshmukh; Pentala Harikrishna; Aravindh Chithambaram; Bhakti Kulkarni; Vaishali Rameshbabu; Praggnanandhaa Rameshbabu; Vantika Agrawal
3rd place, bronze medalist(s)	2021	Viswanathan Anand; Vidit Gujrathi; Koneru Humpy; Harika Dronavalli; Nihal Sarin; Vaishali Rameshbabu; Pentala Harikrishna; Adhiban Baskaran; Tania Sachdev; Bhakti Kulkarni; Praggnanandhaa Rameshbabu; Savitha Shri Baskar

== World Championship ==
=== Open ===
Year	Player	Result	Score
1995	Viswanathan Anand	2nd place, silver medalist(s)	7.5
1998	Viswanathan Anand	2nd place, silver medalist(s)	3
2000	Viswanathan Anand	1st place, gold medalist(s)	3.5
2005	Viswanathan Anand	2nd place, silver medalist(s)	8.5
2007	Viswanathan Anand	1st place, gold medalist(s)	9
2008	Viswanathan Anand	1st place, gold medalist(s)	6.5
2010	Viswanathan Anand	1st place, gold medalist(s)	6.5
2012	Viswanathan Anand	1st place, gold medalist(s)	8.5
2013	Viswanathan Anand	2nd place, silver medalist(s)	3.5
2014	Viswanathan Anand	2nd place, silver medalist(s)	4.5
2024	Gukesh Dommaraju	1st place, gold medalist(s)	7.5
2026	Gukesh Dommaraju	TBD	TBD

=== Women ===
Year	Player	Result	Score
2004	Koneru Humpy	3rd place, bronze medalist(s)	Semifinalist
2008	Koneru Humpy	3rd place, bronze medalist(s)	Semifinalist
2010	Koneru Humpy	3rd place, bronze medalist(s)	Semifinalist
2011	Koneru Humpy	2nd place, silver medalist(s)	2.5
2012	Harika Dronavalli	3rd place, bronze medalist(s)	Semifinalist
2015	Harika Dronavalli	3rd place, bronze medalist(s)	Semifinalist
2017	Harika Dronavalli	3rd place, bronze medalist(s)	Semifinalist
2027	Vaishali Rameshbabu	TBD	TBD

== World Rapid and Blitz Championships ==
=== Open ===
Rapid

Medal	Event	Player
1st place, gold medalist(s)	2003 Cap d'Agde	Viswanathan Anand
3rd place, bronze medalist(s)	2014 Dubai	Viswanathan Anand
1st place, gold medalist(s)	2017 Riyadh	Viswanathan Anand
3rd place, bronze medalist(s)	2025 Doha	Arjun Erigaisi

Blitz

Medal	Event	Player
2nd place, silver medalist(s)	2007 Moscow	Viswanathan Anand
2nd place, silver medalist(s)	2009 Moscow	Viswanathan Anand
3rd place, bronze medalist(s)	2017 Riyadh	Viswanathan Anand
3rd place, bronze medalist(s)	2025 Doha	Arjun Erigaisi

=== Women ===
Rapid

Medal	Event	Player
3rd place, bronze medalist(s)	2012 Batumi	Koneru Humpy
1st place, gold medalist(s)	2019 Moscow	Koneru Humpy
3rd place, bronze medalist(s)	2022 Almaty	Savitha Shri Baskar
2nd place, silver medalist(s)	2023 Samarkand	Koneru Humpy
1st place, gold medalist(s)	2024 New York	Koneru Humpy
3rd place, bronze medalist(s)	2025 Doha	Koneru Humpy

Blitz

Medal	Event	Player
2nd place, silver medalist(s)	2022 Almaty	Koneru Humpy
3rd place, bronze medalist(s)	2024 New York	Vaishali Rameshbabu

== World Team Championship ==
=== Open ===
Medal	Event	Team	Points
3rd place, bronze medalist(s)	2010 Bursa	Pentala Harikrishna; Surya Shekhar Ganguly; Sasikiran Krishnan; Geetha Narayanan Gopal; Subramanian Arun Prasad; Adhiban Baskaran	13

Medal	Event	Player	Category
1st place, gold medalist(s)	2010 Bursa	Surya Shekhar Ganguly	Board 3
3rd place, bronze medalist(s)	2010 Bursa	Subramanian Arun Prasad	Board 5
3rd place, bronze medalist(s)	2017 Khanty-Mansiysk	Vidit Gujrathi	Board 1
3rd place, bronze medalist(s)	2017 Khanty-Mansiysk	Adhiban Baskaran	Board 2
1st place, gold medalist(s)	2019 Astana	Adhiban Baskaran	Board 1
1st place, gold medalist(s)	2019 Astana	Surya Shekhar Ganguly	Board 3
3rd place, bronze medalist(s)	2022 Jerusalem	S. L. Narayanan	Board 3

=== Women ===
Medal	Event	Team	Points
2nd place, silver medalist(s)	2021 Sitges	Harika Dronavalli; Vaishali Rameshbabu; Tania Sachdev; Bhakti Kulkarni; Mary Ann Gomes	13

Medal	Event	Player	Category
2nd place, silver medalist(s)	2009 Ningbo	Eesha Karavade	Board 3
1st place, gold medalist(s)	2011 Mardin	Koneru Humpy	Best performance rating
1st place, gold medalist(s)	2011 Mardin	Koneru Humpy	Board 1
2nd place, silver medalist(s)	2011 Mardin	Harika Dronavalli	Board 2
3rd place, bronze medalist(s)	2013 Astana	Mary Ann Gomes	Board 4
2nd place, silver medalist(s)	2013 Astana	Soumya Swaminathan	Board 5
3rd place, bronze medalist(s)	2015 Chengdu	Koneru Humpy	Board 1
2nd place, silver medalist(s)	2015 Chengdu	Harika Dronavalli	Board 2
3rd place, bronze medalist(s)	2017 Khanty-Mansiysk	Eesha Karavade	Board 3
2nd place, silver medalist(s)	2021 Sitges	Harika Dronavalli	Board 1
3rd place, bronze medalist(s)	2021 Sitges	Mary Ann Gomes	Board 5

== Asian Team Championship ==
=== Open ===
Medal	Event	Team
3rd place, bronze medalist(s)	1983 New Delhi	Dibyendu Barua; Pravin Thipsay; Pabitra Mohanty; Syed Nasir Ali; Mohamed Rafiq Khan; Neeraj Kumar Mishra
2nd place, silver medalist(s)	1986 Dubai	Vaidyanathan Ravikumar; Arun Vaidya; Ahanthem Meetei; Viswanathan Anand; Devaki Prasad; Balottam Verma
3rd place, bronze medalist(s)	1989 Genting Highlands	Viswanathan Anand; Pravin Thipsay; Lanka Ravi; Raja Ravi Sekhar; Dibyendu Barua; N. Sudhakar Babu
3rd place, bronze medalist(s)	1999 Shenyang	Sasikiran Krishnan; Pravin Thipsay; Abhijit Kunte; Devaki Prasad; G. B. Prakash
2nd place, silver medalist(s)	2003 Jodhpur	Sasikiran Krishnan; Surya Shekhar Ganguly; Pentala Harikrishna; Dibyendu Barua; Abhijit Kunte
3rd place, bronze medalist(s)	2003 Jodhpur	Neelotpal Das; Sriram Jha; Lanka Ravi; Dinesh Kumar Sharma; Roktim Bandyopadhyay
1st place, gold medalist(s)	2005 Esfahan	Sasikiran Krishnan; Abhijit Kunte; Surya Shekhar Ganguly; Sundararajan Kidambi; Sandipan Chanda
2nd place, silver medalist(s)	2008 Visakhapatnam	Sasikiran Krishnan; Surya Shekhar Ganguly; Abhijit Kunte; Geetha Narayanan Gopal; Abhijeet Gupta
1st place, gold medalist(s)	2009 Kolkata	Pentala Harikrishna; Sasikiran Krishnan; Surya Shekhar Ganguly; Parimarjan Negi; J. Deepan Chakkravarthy
2nd place, silver medalist(s)	2012 Zaozhuang	Sasikiran Krishnan; Pentala Harikrishna; Parimarjan Negi; Abhijeet Gupta; Geetha Narayanan Gopal
2nd place, silver medalist(s)	2014 Tabriz	S. P. Sethuraman; Adhiban Baskaran; Sasikiran Krishnan; Parimarjan Negi; Musunuri Rohit Lalit Babu
1st place, gold medalist(s)	2016 Abu Dhabi	Adhiban Baskaran; S. P. Sethuraman; Vidit Gujrathi; Sasikiran Krishnan; Deep Sengupta
2nd place, silver medalist(s)	2018 Hamadan	Adhiban Baskaran; S. P. Sethuraman; Sasikiran Krishnan; Surya Shekhar Ganguly; Abhijeet Gupta

Medal	Event	Player	Category
2nd place, silver medalist(s)	1977 Auckland	Nasiruddin Ghalib	Board 6
3rd place, bronze medalist(s)	1981 Hangzhou	Manuel Aaron	Board 1
1st place, gold medalist(s)	1981 Hangzhou	Tiruchi Natesan Parameswaran	Board 2
3rd place, bronze medalist(s)	1983 New Delhi	Dibyendu Barua	Board 1
1st place, gold medalist(s)	1983 New Delhi	Pravin Thipsay	Board 2
2nd place, silver medalist(s)	1986 Dubai	Ahanthem Meetei	Board 3
1st place, gold medalist(s)	1986 Dubai	Viswanathan Anand	Board 4
2nd place, silver medalist(s)	1986 Dubai	Devaki Prasad	Board 5
1st place, gold medalist(s)	1987 Singapore	Devaki Prasad	Board 5
1st place, gold medalist(s)	1989 Genting Highlands	Viswanathan Anand	Board 1
3rd place, bronze medalist(s)	1989 Genting Highlands	Dibyendu Barua	Board 5
1st place, gold medalist(s)	1989 Genting Highlands	N. Sudhakar Babu	Board 6
3rd place, bronze medalist(s)	1991 Penang	P. D. S. Girinath	Board 1
3rd place, bronze medalist(s)	1993 Kuala Lumpur	Jayant Suresh Gokhale	Board 6
3rd place, bronze medalist(s)	1999 Shenyang	Abhijit Kunte	Board 3
1st place, gold medalist(s)	1999 Shenyang	G. B. Prakash	Board 5
3rd place, bronze medalist(s)	2003 Jodhpur	Sasikiran Krishnan	Board 1
1st place, gold medalist(s)	2003 Jodhpur	Pravin Thipsay	Board 2
1st place, gold medalist(s)	2003 Jodhpur	Lanka Ravi	Board 3
2nd place, silver medalist(s)	2003 Jodhpur	Dinesh Kumar Sharma	Board 4
2nd place, silver medalist(s)	2003 Jodhpur	Abhijit Kunte	Board 5
2nd place, silver medalist(s)	2005 Esfahan	Sasikiran Krishnan	Board 1
3rd place, bronze medalist(s)	2005 Esfahan	Abhijit Kunte	Board 2
1st place, gold medalist(s)	2005 Esfahan	Surya Shekhar Ganguly	Board 3
2nd place, silver medalist(s)	2005 Esfahan	Sundararajan Kidambi	Board 4
2nd place, silver medalist(s)	2005 Esfahan	Sandipan Chanda	Board 5
2nd place, silver medalist(s)	2008 Visakhapatnam	Sasikiran Krishnan	Board 1
2nd place, silver medalist(s)	2008 Visakhapatnam	Surya Shekhar Ganguly	Board 2
3rd place, bronze medalist(s)	2008 Visakhapatnam	Abhijit Kunte	Board 3
1st place, gold medalist(s)	2008 Visakhapatnam	Geetha Narayanan Gopal	Board 4
2nd place, silver medalist(s)	2008 Visakhapatnam	Abhijeet Gupta	Board 5
3rd place, bronze medalist(s)	2009 Kolkata	Pentala Harikrishna	Board 1
1st place, gold medalist(s)	2009 Kolkata	Sasikiran Krishnan	Board 2
1st place, gold medalist(s)	2009 Kolkata	Surya Shekhar Ganguly	Board 3
1st place, gold medalist(s)	2009 Kolkata	Parimarjan Negi	Board 4
3rd place, bronze medalist(s)	2009 Kolkata	J. Deepan Chakkravarthy	Board 5
1st place, gold medalist(s)	2012 Zaozhuang	Parimarjan Negi	Board 3
1st place, gold medalist(s)	2012 Zaozhuang	Abhijeet Gupta	Board 3
1st place, gold medalist(s)	2014 Tabriz	Sasikiran Krishnan	Board 3
2nd place, silver medalist(s)	2014 Tabriz	Parimarjan Negi	Board 4
3rd place, bronze medalist(s)	2014 Tabriz	Musunuri Rohit Lalit Babu	Board 5
2nd place, silver medalist(s)	2016 Abu Dhabi	Adhiban Baskaran	Board 1
3rd place, bronze medalist(s)	2016 Abu Dhabi	S. P. Sethuraman	Board 2
1st place, gold medalist(s)	2016 Abu Dhabi	Vidit Gujrathi	Board 3
2nd place, silver medalist(s)	2016 Abu Dhabi	Sasikiran Krishnan	Board 4
2nd place, silver medalist(s)	2018 Hamadan	Adhiban Baskaran	Board 1
1st place, gold medalist(s)	2018 Hamadan	S. P. Sethuraman	Board 2
1st place, gold medalist(s)	2018 Hamadan	Sasikiran Krishnan	Board 3
3rd place, bronze medalist(s)	2018 Hamadan	Abhijeet Gupta	Board 5

=== Women ===
Medal	Event	Team
3rd place, bronze medalist(s)	1999 Shenyang	Bhagyashree Thipsay; Subbaraman Vijayalakshmi; Swati Ghate; Shahnaz Safira
3rd place, bronze medalist(s)	2003 Jodhpur	Subbaraman Vijayalakshmi; Nisha Mohota; Aarthie Ramaswamy; Harika Dronavalli
2nd place, silver medalist(s)	2005 Esfahan	Nisha Mohota; Mary Ann Gomes; Swati Ghate; Anupama Gokhale
2nd place, silver medalist(s)	2008 Visakhapatnam	Harika Dronavalli; Nisha Mohota; Tania Sachdev; Aarthie Ramaswamy
2nd place, silver medalist(s)	2009 Kolkata	Harika Dronavalli; Eesha Karavade; Tania Sachdev; Soumya Swaminathan; Kruttika Nadig
2nd place, silver medalist(s)	2012 Zaozhuang	Harika Dronavalli; Eesha Karavade; Tania Sachdev; Mary Ann Gomes; Padmini Rout
2nd place, silver medalist(s)	2014 Tabriz	Harika Dronavalli; Tania Sachdev; Eesha Karavade; Mary Ann Gomes; Padmini Rout
3rd place, bronze medalist(s)	2018 Hamadan	Harika Dronavalli; Vaishali Rameshbabu; Eesha Karavade; Padmini Rout; Aakanksha Hagawane

Medal	Event	Player	Category
2nd place, silver medalist(s)	1999 Shenyang	Subbaraman Vijayalakshmi	Board 2
2nd place, silver medalist(s)	1999 Shenyang	Swati Ghate	Board 3
2nd place, silver medalist(s)	1999 Shenyang	Shahnaz Safira	Board 4
3rd place, bronze medalist(s)	2003 Jodhpur	Subbaraman Meenakshi	Board 1
2nd place, silver medalist(s)	2003 Jodhpur	Swati Ghate	Board 2
2nd place, silver medalist(s)	2003 Jodhpur	Anupama Gokhale	Board 3
1st place, gold medalist(s)	2003 Jodhpur	Harika Dronavalli	Board 4
3rd place, bronze medalist(s)	2003 Jodhpur	Sai Meera Ravi	Board 4
2nd place, silver medalist(s)	2005 Esfahan	Nisha Mohota	Board 1
2nd place, silver medalist(s)	2005 Esfahan	Mary Ann Gomes	Board 2
1st place, gold medalist(s)	2005 Esfahan	Swati Ghate	Board 3
2nd place, silver medalist(s)	2008 Visakhapatnam	Harika Dronavalli	Board 1
2nd place, silver medalist(s)	2008 Visakhapatnam	Nisha Mohota	Board 2
2nd place, silver medalist(s)	2008 Visakhapatnam	Tania Sachdev	Board 3
1st place, gold medalist(s)	2008 Visakhapatnam	Aarthie Ramaswamy	Board 4
3rd place, bronze medalist(s)	2008 Visakhapatnam	Tejaswi Kanuri	Board 4
1st place, gold medalist(s)	2009 Kolkata	Harika Dronavalli	Board 1
2nd place, silver medalist(s)	2009 Kolkata	Tania Sachdev	Board 3
3rd place, bronze medalist(s)	2009 Kolkata	Padmini Rout	Board 3
3rd place, bronze medalist(s)	2009 Kolkata	Bhakti Kulkarni	Board 4
2nd place, silver medalist(s)	2009 Kolkata	Kruttika Nadig	Board 5
3rd place, bronze medalist(s)	2012 Zaozhuang	Tania Sachdev	Board 3
2nd place, silver medalist(s)	2012 Zaozhuang	Padmini Rout	Board 5
1st place, gold medalist(s)	2014 Tabriz	Harika Dronavalli	Board 1
2nd place, silver medalist(s)	2014 Tabriz	Tania Sachdev	Board 2
3rd place, bronze medalist(s)	2014 Tabriz	Mary Ann Gomes	Board 4
2nd place, silver medalist(s)	2014 Tabriz	Padmini Rout	Board 5
2nd place, silver medalist(s)	2016 Abu Dhabi	Harika Dronavalli	Board 2
1st place, gold medalist(s)	2016 Abu Dhabi	Soumya Swaminathan	Board 4
2nd place, silver medalist(s)	2018 Hamadan	Harika Dronavalli	Board 1
3rd place, bronze medalist(s)	2018 Hamadan	Eesha Karavade	Board 3
3rd place, bronze medalist(s)	2018 Hamadan	Padmini Rout	Board 4
3rd place, bronze medalist(s)	2018 Hamadan	Aakanksha Hagawane	Board 5

== World Cup ==
=== Open ===
Medal	Event	Player
1st place, gold medalist(s)	2000 Shenyang	Viswanathan Anand
1st place, gold medalist(s)	2002 Hyderabad	Viswanathan Anand
2nd place, silver medalist(s)	2023 Baku	Praggnanandhaa Rameshbabu

=== Women ===
Medal	Event	Player
1st place, gold medalist(s)	2025 Batumi	Divya Deshmukh
2nd place, silver medalist(s)	2025 Batumi	Koneru Humpy

== Asian Games ==
=== Men's team standard ===
Medal	Event	Team
3rd place, bronze medalist(s)	2010 Guangzhou	Pentala Harikrishna; Sasikiran Krishnan; Surya Shekhar Ganguly; Geetha Narayanan Gopal; Adhiban Baskaran
2nd place, silver medalist(s)	2022 Hangzhou	Gukesh Dommaraju; Praggnanandhaa Rameshbabu; Vidit Gujrathi; Arjun Erigaisi; Pentala Harikrishna

=== Women's team standard ===
Medal	Event	Team
2nd place, silver medalist(s)	2022 Hangzhou	Koneru Humpy; Harika Dronavalli; Vaishali Rameshbabu; Vantika Agrawal; Savitha Shri Baskar

=== Mixed team standard ===
Medal	Event	Team
1st place, gold medalist(s)	2006 Doha	Sasikiran Krishnan; Pentala Harikrishna; Koneru Humpy

=== Women's individual rapid ===
Medal	Event	Team
1st place, gold medalist(s)	2006 Doha	Koneru Humpy
3rd place, bronze medalist(s)	2010 Guangzhou	Harika Dronavalli

== Asian Indoor and Martial Arts Games ==
=== Men's individual standard ===
Medal	Event	Team
3rd place, bronze medalist(s)	2017 Ashgabat	Sasikiran Krishnan

=== Women's individual standard ===
Medal	Event	Team
3rd place, bronze medalist(s)	2007 Macau	Harika Dronavalli

=== Mixed team standard ===
Medal	Event	Team
2nd place, silver medalist(s)	2007 Macau	Sasikiran Krishnan; Surya Shekhar Ganguly; J. Deepan Chakkravarthy; Koneru Humpy; Harika Dronavalli; Tania Sachdev

=== Men's individual rapid ===
Medal	Event	Team
1st place, gold medalist(s)	2007 Macau	Sasikiran Krishnan
3rd place, bronze medalist(s)	2009 Vietnam	Sasikiran Krishnan

=== Men's team rapid U-23 ===
Medal	Event	Team
3rd place, bronze medalist(s)	2017 Ashgabat	Karthikeyan Murali; Diptayan Ghosh

=== Women's individual rapid ===
Medal	Event	Team
1st place, gold medalist(s)	2007 Macau	Harika Dronavalli
3rd place, bronze medalist(s)	2009 Vietnam	Harika Dronavalli

=== Women's team rapid ===
Medal	Event	Team
3rd place, bronze medalist(s)	2017 Ashgabat	Padmini Rout; Tania Sachdev

=== Mixed team rapid ===
Medal	Event	Team
1st place, gold medalist(s)	2007 Macau	Sasikiran Krishnan; Surya Shekhar Ganguly; J. Deepan Chakkravarthy; Koneru Humpy; Harika Dronavalli; Tania Sachdev
3rd place, bronze medalist(s)	2009 Vietnam	Pentala Harikrishna; Parimarjan Negi; Sasikiran Krishnan; Harika Dronavalli; Tania Sachdev; Eesha Karavade

=== Men's individual blitz ===
Medal	Event	Team
1st place, gold medalist(s)	2007 Macau	Sasikiran Krishnan

=== Men's team blitz ===
Medal	Event	Team
3rd place, bronze medalist(s)	2017 Ashgabat	Sasikiran Krishnan; Surya Shekhar Ganguly

=== Men's team blitz U-23 ===
Medal	Event	Team
3rd place, bronze medalist(s)	2017 Ashgabat	Diptayan Ghosh; Vaibhav Suri

=== Women's individual blitz ===
Medal	Event	Team
1st place, gold medalist(s)	2007 Macau	Koneru Humpy

=== Mixed team blitz ===
Medal	Event	Team
2nd place, silver medalist(s)	2007 Macau	Sasikiran Krishnan; Surya Shekhar Ganguly; Subramanian Arun Prasad; Koneru Humpy; Harika Dronavalli; Subbaraman Meenakshi
3rd place, bronze medalist(s)	2009 Vietnam	Pentala Harikrishna; Laxman Rajaram; Sasikiran Krishnan; Harika Dronavalli; Tania Sachdev; Eesha Karavade

== National award recipients ==
Year	Recipient	Award	Gender
1991–1992	Viswanathan Anand	Khel Ratna Award	Male
1961	Manuel Aaron	Arjuna Award	Male
1980–1981	Rohini Khadilkar	Arjuna Award	Female
1983	Dibyendu Barua	Arjuna Award	Male
1984	Pravin Thipsay	Arjuna Award	Male
1985	Viswanathan Anand	Arjuna Award	Male
1986	Raghunandan Vasant Gokhle	Dronacharya Award	Male
1987	Devaki Prasad	Arjuna Award	Male
1987	Bhagyashree Thipsay	Arjuna Award	Female
1990	Anupama Gokhale	Arjuna Award	Female
2000	Subbaraman Vijayalakshmi	Arjuna Award	Female
2002	Krishnan Sasikiran	Arjuna Award	Male
2003	Koneru Humpy	Arjuna Award	Female
2005	Surya Shekhar Ganguly	Arjuna Award	Male
2006	Pentala Harikrishna	Arjuna Award	Male
2006	Koneru Ashok	Dronacharya Award	Male
2007	Harika Dronavalli	Arjuna Award	Female
2009	Tania Sachdev	Arjuna Award	Female
2010	Parimarjan Negi	Arjuna Award	Male
2013	Abhijeet Gupta	Arjuna Award	Male
2022	Bhakti Kulkarni	Arjuna Award	Female
2022	R Praggnanandhaa	Arjuna Award	Male
2023	R Vaishali	Arjuna Award	Female
2021	Abhijit Kunte	Dhyan Chand Award	Male
2023	RB Ramesh	Dronacharya Award	Male
2024	Gukesh Dommaraju	Khel Ratna Award	Male
2024	Vantika Agrawal	Arjuna Award	Female
2025	Divya Deshmukh	Arjuna Award	Female
2025	Vidit Gujrathi	Arjuna Award	Male

== See also ==
- List of Indian chess players
- Indian chess
- All India Chess Federation for the Blind
- Chess Players Association of India
