= Commonwealth Chess Championship =

International chess competition

Commonwealth Chess Championships logo

The Commonwealth Chess Championship is a gathering of chess players from Commonwealth countries. The event offers direct titles: IM titles to the winners, and FM titles (and IM norms) to the silver and bronze medalists.

== Winners ==
| # | Year | City | Winner |
|---|---|---|---|
| (1) | 1950 | Oxford | William Fairhurst (SCO) |
| 1 | 1983 | Melbourne | Ian Rogers (AUS) & Gregory Hjorth (AUS) |
| 2 | 1984 | Hong Kong | Kevin Spraggett (CAN) & Murray Chandler (ENG) |
| 3 | 1985 | London | Praveen Thipsay (IND) & Kevin Spraggett (CAN) |
| 4 | 1986 | London | Devaki V. Prasad (IND) |
| 5 | 1987 | London | Murray Chandler (ENG) |
| 6 | 1988 | London | Gary Lane (ENG) & Michael Adams (ENG) |
| 7 | 1989 | London | Ian Rogers (AUS) |
| 8 | 1991 | London | Michael Adams (ENG) |
| 9 | 1992 | Kuala Lumpur | Colin McNab (SCO) |
| 10 | 1993 | London | Jonathan Speelman (ENG) |
| 11 | 1996 | Calcutta | Poorna Sharma Mithrakanth (IND) |
| 12 | 1999 | Bikaner | Alexander Baburin (IRL) (off contest); Atanu Lahiri (IND) |
| 13 | 2000 | Sangli | Krishnan Sasikiran (IND) |
| 14 | 2001 | London | Pentala Harikrishna (IND) |
| 15 | 2003 | Mumbai | Nguyen Anh Dung (VIE) (off contest); Dibyendu Barua (IND) |
| 16 | 2004 | Mumbai | Nigel Short (ENG) |
| 17 | 2006 | Mumbai | Nigel Short (ENG) |
| 18 | 2007 | New Delhi | Ramachandran Ramesh (IND) |
| 19 | 2008 | Nagpur | Nigel Short (ENG) |
| 20 | 2009 | Singapore | Enrique Paciencia (SIN) |
| 21 | 2010 | New Delhi | Rajaram Laxman (IND) |
| 22 | 2011 | Ekurhuleni | Gawain Jones (ENG) |
| 23 | 2012 | Chennai | Babu M.R. Lalith (IND) |
| 24 | 2013 | Port Elizabeth | Abhijeet Gupta (IND) |
| 25 | 2014 | Glasgow | Deep Sengupta (IND) |
| 26 | 2015 | New Delhi | Abhijeet Gupta (IND) |
| 27 | 2016 | Kalutara | Abhijeet Gupta (IND) |
| 28 | 2017 | New Delhi | Abhijeet Gupta (IND) |
| 29 | 2018 | New Delhi | Karthikeyan P (IND) |
| 30 | 2019 | New Delhi | Abhijeet Gupta (IND) |
| 31 | 2022 | Sri Lanka | P Shyam Nikhil (IND) |
| 32 | 2023–24 | Malacca, Malaysia | Mitrabha Guha (IND) |
| 33 | 2024 | Wadduwa, Sri Lanka | S.P. Sethuraman (IND) |
| 34 | 2025 | Kuala Lumpur, Malaysia | Daniel Fernandez (ENG) |
| 35 | 2026 | Kalutara, Sri Lanka | Mitrabha Guha (IND) |

== Women Winners ==
| # | Year | City | Women's Winner |
|---|---|---|---|
| 1 | 2006 | Mumbai | Harika Dronavalli (IND) |
| 2 | 2007 | New Delhi | Harika Dronavalli (IND) |
| 3 | 2008 | Nagpur | Meenakshi Subbaraman (IND) |
| 4 | 2009 | Singapore | Mitali Madhukar Patil (IND) |
| 5 | 2010 | New Delhi | Harika Dronavalli (IND) |
| 6 | 2011 | Ekurhuleni | Eesha Karavade (IND) |
| 7 | 2012 | Chennai | Soumya Swaminathan (IND) |
| 8 | 2013 | Port Elizabeth | Jovanka Houska (ENG) |
| 9 | 2014 | Glasgow | Bhakti Kulkarni (IND) |
| 10 | 2015 | New Delhi | Padmini Rout (IND) |
| 11 | 2016 | Kalutara | Tania Sachdev (IND) |
| 12 | 2017 | New Delhi | Swati Ghate (IND) |
| 13 | 2018 | New Delhi | Tania Sachdev (IND) |
| 14 | 2019 | New Delhi | Tania Sachdev (IND) |
| 15 | 2022 | Sri Lanka | Nutakki Priyanka (IND) |
| 16 | 2023–24 | Malacca, Malaysia | Gong Qianyun (SIN) |
| 17 | 2024 | Wadduwa, Sri Lanka | Mary Ann Gomes (IND) |
| 18 | 2025 | Kuala Lumpur, Malaysia | Srija Seshadri (IND) |
| 19 | 2026 | Kalutara, Sri Lanka | Mary Ann Gomes (IND) |

== History ==
A championship was planned for New Zealand in 1949, but it was canceled because the British Chess Federation was unable to attend.

=== Oxford 1950 ===
In 1950 an informal all-play-all championship was held as the strongest players of Canada (Daniel Yanofsky), New Zealand (Robert Wade), and South Africa (Wolfgang Heidenfeld) were all in England. The field was rounded out with a player from England, Scotland, and a promising Australian. William Fairhurst (Scotland) won the unofficial championship held in Oxford.

=== Melbourne 1983 ===
The Commonwealth Chess Association (formed in 1981) planned a 1982 championship in Nigeria, but it was not held. The 1983 Swiss system tournament was held in Melbourne, and won by Ian Rogers and Gregory Hjorth, both of Australia.

=== Hong Kong 1984 ===
The winners of the 1984 Hong Kong tournament were Kevin Spraggett (Canada) and Murray Chandler (England).

=== London 1985 ===
The winners of the 1985 London tournament were Praveen Thipsay (India) and Kevin Spraggett.

=== London 1987 ===
The winner of the 1987 London tournament was Murray Chandler (England). The title was awarded to the highest eligible player in the 11th Lloyds Bank Masters, played at the Park Lane Hotel, London, 22–31 August 1987. Chandler tied for first place on 8/10 with Michael Wilder (USA), who was not eligible for the Commonwealth title.

=== London 1988 ===
In 1988 the championship title was shared by Gary Lane and Michael Adams. It was awarded to the highest eligible player(s) in the 12th Lloyds Bank Masters, played at the Ramada Inn, London, 20–29 August 1988. At the time Gary Lane was registered as an English player. Scores: 1-2 Gary Lane, Michael Adams 8/10.

=== London 1989 ===
In 1989 the championship was won by Ian Rogers (Australia). It was awarded to the highest eligible player(s) in the 13th Lloyds Bank Masters, played at the Cumberland Hotel, Marble Arch, London, August 1989. Ian Rogers scored 8/10, behind the ineligible Zurab Azmaiparashvili (Georgia) on 8½.

=== Calcutta 1996 ===
Mithrakanth of India won with 7.5/10. Gokhale, Sriram, Praven Thipsay and McNab tied for second place on 7.0. Seventeen-year-old S. Vijaylakshmi won the women's title and earned an IM norm.

=== Bikaner 1999 ===
Grandmaster Alexander Baburin of Ireland remained undefeated throughout with 8.5/10 but since Ireland is outside the Commonwealth federation the title went to Atanu Lahiri.

=== Sangli 2000 ===
The championship with 72 players was played as an 11-round Swiss event. Four players ended with 8.5/11: Max Sorokin, Krishnan Sasikiran, Evgeny Vladimirov and Alexander Fominyh. Sorokin won the championship on tie-break points but the title went to Krishnan Sasikiran.

=== London 2001 ===
The commonwealth chess championships was incorporated into the main Mind Sports Olympiad chess event, "The Ron Banwell Masters" at the Southbank University. India sent a strong contingent of GMs and the event was won for India by Pentala Harikrishna.

=== Mumbai 2003 ===
Nguyen Anh Dung from Vietnam finished first with 8.5/10, the title went to 4th placed Dibyendu Barua.

=== Mumbai 2004 ===
The 2004 Championships were held in Mumbai, India. The winner was Nigel Short. In 2005 the event was scheduled to be played, but was in the end cancelled.

=== Mumbai 2006 ===
The event was won by Nigel Short with the emphatic score of 9/10. Indians Chanda Sandipan and M R Venkatesh scored 8/10 for 2nd-3rd places.

=== New Delhi 2007 ===
Sponsored by Parsvnath Developers Ltd., the 2007 tournament was held at the Sirifort Sports Complex, Khel, New Delhi. The Delhi Chess Association organized the event on behalf of the All India Chess Federation and Commonwealth Chess Association and the ten-round Swiss system tournament boasted a record field of 282 players included entries from eleven Commonwealth countries: Australia, Bangladesh, England, India, Malaysia, Maldives, Pakistan, Singapore, South Africa, Sri Lanka, and Trinidad and Tobago, with 13 Grandmasters, 35 International Masters, 5 Woman Grandmasters and 7 Woman International Masters. The prize fund totaled US$20,000, with $4000 for the winner.

Former British Champion GM R. B. Ramesh won the final three rounds to tie with top seed GM Surya Shekhar Ganguly at 8½/10 points. Ramesh won the title on tie-break, with Ramesh and Ganguly splitting the top two prizes equally for Rs 137,500 (approximately €2400). IM Abhijeet Gupta finished third with 8, completing the requirements for the Grandmaster title to become India's 17th Grandmaster. He also won the Under-20 prize and received Rs 75,000. IM Dronavalli Harika won Rs 40,000 by taking the women's title for the second consecutive year with an overall finish in seventh place. There were three medals (gold, silver, and bronze) awarded in each fifteen categories: Overall, Women, Seniors, Under-20, Girls Under-20, and boys and girls U-18, U-16, U-14, U-12, and U-10. Players from India won 44 of the 45 medals, with English GM Gawain Jones preventing the sweep by winning the U-20 bronze.

=== Nagpur 2008 ===
The 2008 tournament was held in the orange city of Nagpur at the navedhyam celebration center. The tournament was won by two time previous champion Nigel Short and won the prize money of 1,80,000 INR.

=== Singapore 2009 ===
The 2009 tournament was originally scheduled to be held in Ipoh, Malaysia, but eventually moved to Singapore, where it was held along the 6th Singapore International Chess Festival. It was won by Singapore IM Enrique Paciencia with a score of 7.5/9. Indian IM Jayaram Ashwin finished second with 6.5/9, and Australian master Max Illingworth finished in third place with 6/9.

=== New Delhi 2019 ===
The 2019 edition was hosted in the capital city of India, New Delhi which had hosted the 2010,2015,2017,2018 editions. It was the third time in a row that New Delhi hosted the event. It was held at The Leela Ambience Convention Hotel from 29 June 2019 to 7 July 2019. The tournament was won by Abhijeet Gupta of India. It was his fifth Commonwealth Chess Championship victory and the 8th time in a row an Indian has won the event.

=== Melaka 2023–24 ===
After months of discussion and planning, the Commonwealth Chess Association agreed to award Malaysia to organize the Commonwealth Chess Championship 2023–24 in Quarter One of 2024 from 19 to 28 February 2024. Initially planned for 10 to 18 December 2023, MCF was advised not to use the dates due to the upcoming Asian Youth Chess Championship to be held in Al-Ain during the same period.

The CCC was last held in Sri Lanka in 2022 with 198 players took part in the Age Group event, and 98 players in the Open event. The best turnout was in 2013 – hosted by South Africa, when almost 900 players turned out when it had only 2 main sections to offer – the Open section with 314 players, and the challenger event with 567 players. The event skipped 2014 and when India resumed the event in 2015, it introduced the Age Group event with 268 youngsters taking part, and another 298 players in the Open section.

Malaysia hosted the event once in 1992 in Kuala Lumpur, and was supposed to host it again in 2009 but had to withdraw with Singapore taking over the event from Ipoh. For this Malaysia edition, the Age Group and the Open section have been maintained with an introduction of a Blitz event on the very last day of the Championship.

== See also ==
- Commonwealth Nations Bridge Championships
