= Asian Junior Chess Championship =

Chess championship for players under 20 years old in Asia

The Asian Junior Chess Championship is an annual chess tournament open to players in Asia and Oceania (FIDE Zones 3.1 to 3.7) who are under 20 years of age. The tournament has been held annually since 1977 with occasional interruptions. Since 1985, a separate Asian championship for girls has also been organized. Since at least 1996, the two championships have always been held concurrently.

== Competition ==
The championships are organized by national federations affiliated with the Asian Chess Federation. They are open to chess players who are under 20 years of age as of 1 January of the year in which the championship is held. The championships are organized as a round-robin or a Swiss-system tournament depending on the number of participants. Since 2006, the open championship has been a nine-round Swiss.

The winners of the open and girls' championships earn the right to participate in the next year's World Junior Chess Championships. In the open championship, the top three players after tiebreaks all earn the International Master title, while the first-placed player additionally earns a norm towards the Grandmaster title. In the girls' championship, the top three players after tiebreaks all earn the Woman International Master title, while the first-placed player additionally earns a norm towards the Woman Grandmaster title.

== Results ==
=== Open championship ===
Results are taken from Olimpbase unless otherwise indicated.

Year	Host city	Winner
1977	Baguio, Philippines	Murray Chandler (NZL)
1978	Tehran, Iran	Vaidyanathan Ravikumar (IND)
1979	Sivakasi, India	Wong Meng Kong (SIN)
1980	Baguio, Philippines	Domingo Ramos (PHI)
1981	Dhaka, Bangladesh	Ricardo de Guzman (PHI)
1982	Baguio, Philippines	Marlo Micayabas (PHI)
1983	Kuala Lumpur, Malaysia	Ruben Gunawan (INA)
1984	Coimbatore, India	Viswanathan Anand (IND)
1985	Hong Kong	Viswanathan Anand (IND)
1986	Manila, Philippines	Enrico Sevillano (PHI)
1988	Dubai, United Arab Emirates	Shane Hill (AUS)
1989	Dubai, United Arab Emirates	Rogelio Barcenilla (PHI)
Feb 1991	Kozhikode, India	Rogelio Barcenilla (PHI)
Sep 1991	Dubai, United Arab Emirates	Andi Supardi Suhendra (INA)
1992	Doha, Qatar	Khatanbaatar Bazar (MGL)
1993	Doha, Qatar	Nguyen Khai (VIE)
1994	Shah Alam, Malaysia	Nelson Mariano II (PHI)
1995	Tehran, Iran	Darmen Sadvakasov (KAZ)
1996	Macau	Wu Wenjin (CHN)
1997	Jaipur, India	Abhijit Kunte (IND)
1998	Rasht, Iran	Tejas Bakre (IND)
1999	Vũng Tàu, Vietnam	Krishnan Sasikiran (IND)
2000	Mumbai, India	Tejas Bakre (IND)
2001	Tehran, Iran	Nguyễn Thanh Sơn (VIE)
2002	Marawila, Sri Lanka	J. Deepan Chakkravarthy (IND)
2003	Negombo, Sri Lanka	Magesh Chandran Panchanathan (IND)
2004	Bikaner, India	Subramanian Arun Prasad (IND)
2006	New Delhi, India	Nguyễn Ngọc Trường Sơn (VIE)
2007	Mumbai, India	Karthikeyan Pandian (IND)
2008	Chennai, India	Ashwin Jayaram (IND)
2009	Colombo, Sri Lanka	Ashwin Jayaram (IND)
2010	Chennai, India	Baskaran Adhiban (IND)
2011	Colombo, Sri Lanka	Shyam Sundar M. (IND)
2012	Tashkent, Uzbekistan	Srinath Narayanan (IND)
2013	Sharjah, United Arab Emirates	Srinath Narayanan (IND)
2014	Tagaytay, Philippines	Srinath Narayanan (IND)
2015	Bishkek, Kyrgyzstan	Masoud Mosadeghpour (IRI)
2016	New Delhi, India	Aravindh Chithambaram (IND)
2017	Shiraz, Iran	Masoud Mosadeghpour (IRI)
2018	Ulaanbaatar, Mongolia	Novendra Priasmoro (INA)
2019	Surakarta, Indonesia	Nguyễn Anh Khôi (VIE)
2022	Tagaytay, Philippines	Harshavardhan G. B. (IND)
2024	Tagaytay, Philippines	Aleksey Grebnev (FIDE)

=== Girls' championship ===
Results between 1988 and 1996 are incomplete. Later results are taken from Olimpbase unless otherwise indicated.

Year	Host city	Winner
1985	Adelaide, Australia	Anupama Abhyankar (IND); Audrey Wong (MAS)
1988	Adelaide, Australia	Xie Jun (CHN) (Note: In 1988, the Asian Girls' Junior Championship was incorporated into the World Girls' Junior Championship. Xie Jun tied for second place and received the Asian title as the highest-placed player from Asia.)
1991	Philippines	?
1993	Adelaide, Australia	Saheli Dhar (IND)
1994	Shah Alam, Malaysia	Zhu Chen (CHN)
1996	Macau	Xu Yuhua (CHN)
1997	Jaipur, India	Li Ruofan (CHN)
1998	Rasht, Iran	Nguyễn Thị Dung (VIE)
1999	Vũng Tàu, Vietnam	Wang Yu (CHN)
2000	Mumbai, India	Koneru Humpy (IND)
2001	Tehran, Iran	M. Kasturi (IND)
2002	Marawila, Sri Lanka	Tania Sachdev (IND)
2003	Negombo, Sri Lanka	Prathiba Yuvarajan (IND)
2004	Bikaner, India	Hoàng Thị Bảo Trâm (VIE)
2006	New Delhi, India	Mary Ann Gomes (IND)
2007	Mumbai, India	Mary Ann Gomes (IND)
2008	Chennai, India	Mary Ann Gomes (IND)
2009	Colombo, Sri Lanka	Padmini Rout (IND)
2010	Chennai, India	Võ Thị Kim Phụng (VIE)
2011	Colombo, Sri Lanka	Bhakti Kulkarni (IND)
2012	Tashkent, Uzbekistan	Ivana Maria Furtado (IND)
2013	Sharjah, United Arab Emirates	Võ Thị Kim Phụng (VIE)
2014	Tagaytay, Philippines	Mikee Charlene Suede (PHI)
2015	Bishkek, Kyrgyzstan	Gulrukhbegim Tokhirjonova (UZB)
2016	New Delhi, India	Uuriintuya Uurtsaikh (MGL)
2017	Shiraz, Iran	Ivana Maria Furtado (IND)
2018	Ulaanbaatar, Mongolia	Uuriintuya Uurtsaikh (MGL)
2019	Surakarta, Indonesia	Assel Serikbay (KAZ)
2022	Tagaytay, Philippines	Bach Ngoc Thuy Duong (VIE)
2024	Tagaytay, Philippines	Anna Shukhman (FIDE)

== See also ==
- African Junior Chess Championship
- Pan American Junior Chess Championship
- European Junior Chess Championship
- European Youth Chess Championship

== Links ==
- https://www.olimpbase.org/
