= Ashwin Jayaram =

Indian chess grandmaster (born 1990)

Personal information
- Born: 14 August 1990 (age 35) Aluva, India

Chess career
- Country: India
- Title: Grandmaster (2015)
- FIDE rating: 2472 (July 2026)
- Peak rating: 2515 (September 2015)

Ashwin Jayaram is an Indian chess grandmaster.

== Career ==
Ashwin began playing chess at the age of 8. He was trained by K Ganesan.

He achieved his three GM norms from 2007 to 2009, winning the Asian Junior Chess Championship twice. In 2014, he moved to St Louis, Missouri. In 2015, he surpassed the 2500 rating mark, achieving the Grandmaster title.

== Personal life ==
He studied finance at Webster University and played on their "B" chess team alongside Manuel León Hoyos, Vasif Durarbayli, and Priyadharshan Kannappan.
