= Ruben Gunawan =

Indonesian chess grandmaster (1968–2005)

Personal information
- Born: April 17, 1968 Jakarta, Indonesia
- Died: August 27, 2005 (aged 37) Manado, Indonesia

Chess career
- Country: Indonesia
- Title: Grandmaster (1999)
- Peak rating: 2507 (January 1999)

Ruben Muljadi Gunawan (17 April 1968 – 27 August 2005) was an Indonesian chess Grandmaster (1999).

Born in Jakarta, his earlier achievement was winning the Indonesian U16 championship in 1982 in Bandung. This victory qualified him to play in the Asian Junior Chess Championship 1983, which took place in Kuala Lumpur, Malaysia. Ruben Gunawan won the championship and was awarded the FIDE Master title. In 1984 he won the Indonesian U19 championship.

Gunawan played for Indonesia in the Chess Olympiads of 2000 in Istanbul, and 2004 in Calvià.

He died at the age of 38 in Manado because of heart failure and pneumonia that he had during the Calvià Olympiad. He achieved the 1009th rank at FIDE position in July 2005. His Elo rating at that time was 2463, while the highest rating he ever achieved was 2507 in January 1999.
