= Subramanian Arun Prasad =

Indian chess grandmaster (born 1988)

Personal information
- Born: 21 April 1988 (age 38) Salem, Tamil Nadu, India

Chess career
- Country: India
- Title: Grandmaster (2008)
- FIDE rating: 2507 (September 2026)
- Peak rating: 2570 (November 2009)

Subramanian Arun Prasad (born 21 April 1988) is an Indian chess grandmaster and chess coach. In 2008 he became India's 18th chess Grandmaster. He was a longtime coach of Abhimanyu Mishra, who became the youngest ever grandmaster in 2021.

== Biography ==
Born in Salem, Tamil Nadu, Arun Prasad won the 2004 Asian Under 16 Chess Championship in Tehran, Iran edging out Lê Quang Liêm on tiebreak score and as a result he earned the title of FIDE Master (FM). The same year he also won the Asian Junior Championship on tiebreak over J. Deepan Chakkravarthy in Bikaner, India. Thanks to this achievement Arun Prasad was awarded the title of International Master (IM).

In 2009 he became the first Indian to win the Open in the Scottish Chess Championship in Edinburgh, Scotland. In 2010 he was part of the bronze medal-winning Indian team in World Team Chess Championship in Bursa, Turkey, also winning the individual bronze medal on board 5. In 2011 he won the Paris Chess Championship. In 2015 Arun Prasad finished in third place on tiebreak at the Washington Open, a point behind Gata Kamsky. In 2017, Arun Prasad scored 7/9 at the North American Open and finished in a five-way tie for first place; Robert Hess received the first-place designation on tiebreak.

== Coaching career ==
Arun Prasad received the FIDE Trainer title in 2015. He began coaching Abhimanyu Mishra when Mishra was six. Their work focused particularly on openings and middlegames, including broadening Mishra's opening repertoire. During the interruption of over-the-board tournament play in 2020, Mishra continued training through long sessions with Arun Prasad. When Mishra became the youngest grandmaster in history in 2021, Arun Prasad was credited with extensive work on Mishra's openings and middlegame.
