= Aarthie Ramaswamy =

Indian chess player (born 1981)

Personal information
- Born: 28 June 1981 (age 45) Chennai, Tamil Nadu, India
- Spouse: Ramachandran Ramesh

Chess career
- Country: India
- Title: Woman Grandmaster (2003)
- FIDE rating: 2074 (March 2020)
- Peak rating: 2348 (April 2003)

Aarthie Ramaswamy (born 28 June 1981) is an Indian chess player. She was awarded the title Woman Grandmaster (WGM) by FIDE in 2003.

In 1993, Ramaswamy won the India under-12 girls championship. In 1995, she won the under-14 and under-16 girls championships. In 1998 and 1999, she won the under-18 girls national title. Also in 1999, Ramaswamy won the Girls U18 section of the World Youth Championships, held in Oropesa del Mar, Spain. In 2001, she competed in the Women's World Chess Championship. Ramaswamy won the Indian women's championship in 2003, edging out S. Vijayalakshmi on tiebreak.

She is married to Indian chess grandmaster R. B. Ramesh.
