= Eesha Karavade =

Indian chess player (born 1987)

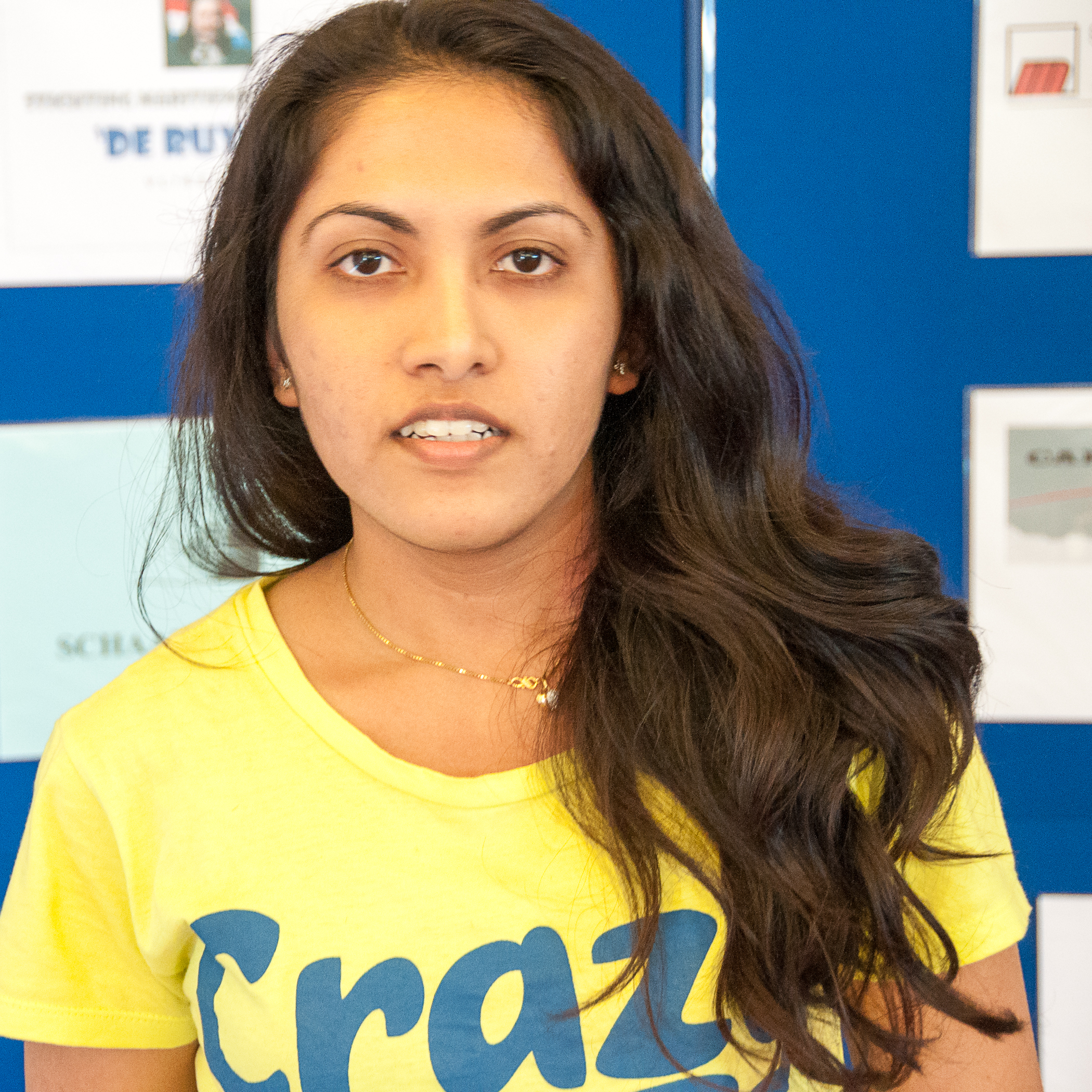
- Karavade in 2012

Personal information
- Born: 21 November 1987 (age 38) Pune, India

Chess career
- Country: India
- Title: International Master (2010); Woman Grandmaster (2005)
- Peak rating: 2425 (November 2016)

Eesha Karavade (born 21 November 1987) is an Indian chess player from Pune. She holds the titles of International Master (IM) and Woman Grandmaster (WGM). She played for India in the Chess Olympiads of 2010, 2012, 2014, 2018 and 2022.

== Achievements ==
- won the Shiv Chhatrapati Award conferred by Govt. of Maharashtra in 2004.
- in 2011: first runner-up, with 8 points out of 11 rounds, in the 38th National Women's Premier Chess Championship at Chennai, which was won by Mary Ann Gomes.
- Gold Medalist Commonwealth Chess Championship 2011 in South Africa.
- Bronze medalist Asian Individual Women Chess Championship 2011 in Iran.
- part of the women chess team that ranked 4th at the 40th Chess Olympiad 2012 in Istanbul.
- part of the women chess team that won a gold medal in the Blitz format and a silver medal in the Rapid and Standard format at the Asian Nations Cup 2014 at Tabriz.
