= Srinath Narayanan =

Indian chess grandmaster (born 1994)

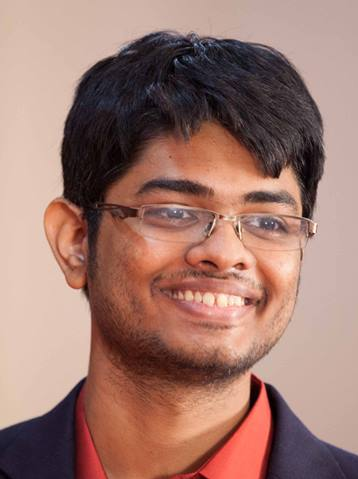
- Srinath in 2024

Personal information
- Born: 14 February 1994 (age 32) Madras, Tamil Nadu, India

Chess career
- Country: India
- Title: Grandmaster (2017)
- FIDE rating: 2516 (July 2026)
- Peak rating: 2572 (November 2018)

Srinath Narayanan (born 14 February 1994) is an Indian chess player. He was awarded the title of Grandmaster by FIDE in August 2017.

== Biography ==
Srinath Narayanan was born and brought up in Chennai. He started playing chess when he was just five years old. In 2002, at the age of 8, he became India's youngest FIDE rated player, with an initial rating of 2088. In July 2005, he took the gold medal in the U12 division at the World Youth Chess Championships held in Belfort, France, edging out Sanan Sjugirov, Samvel Ter-Sahakyan and Wesley So on tiebreak. All four had a final score of 8.5 points. In 2008, he clinched the 7th Dubai Juniors Chess Championship. Srinath played for the Indian team that won the silver medal in the World Youth U16 Chess Olympiad in 2010. He won the Asian Junior Championship in 2012, 2013, and 2014. He became an IM at the age of 14 and a GM in 2017. In 2017, he also finished 2nd at the Runavik Open.

Srinath won the Faroes Open in 2018. He also clinched the 2018 Kolkata Open title. He finished 3rd at the 2021 Sheikh Russel International Chess Tournament in Bangladesh.

== Coaching ==
Srinath is the former coach of prodigies like Grandmasters Nihal Sarin and Arjun Erigaisi and Divya Deshmukh.

As coach, he has played an important role in Indian Chess team performances across tournaments. He was the coach of the Junior team that won the silver medal at the 2018 World Youth Chess Olympiad. He was also the assistant coach of the Senior team that year. He was the captain of the Indian team at the World Teams in 2019. He was the vice captain of the Indian team that won the historic gold medal at the FIDE Online Chess Olympiad 2020. He was the captain of team for the 2021 FIDE Online Olympiad. He was also the captain of the India A team at the 2022 FIDE Chess Olympiad. He led the Indian team as the captain at the 2022 Asian Games in Hangzhou, China, where the team won a silver medal.

In May 2024, Srinath was awarded the title of FIDE Senior Trainer, which made him the youngest in the country and second youngest in the world, after Hou Yifan, to have the title. In Chess Olympiad 2024, Srinath was the non-playing captain of the India Open team which won the gold medal.

He is also a chess streamer and commentator, with 38k subscribers on YouTube.

He has authored two courses on Chessable- the lifetime repertoires Catalan Opening for white and the lifetime repertoires Classical Sicilian for black pieces. He also co-authored a course on London System, with Grandmaster Sahaj Grover.

== See also ==
- Nihal Sarin
