= Tejas Bakre =

Indian chess grandmaster (born 1981)

Personal information
- Born: 12 May 1981 (age 45) Ahmadabad, India

Chess career
- Country: India
- Title: Grandmaster (2004)
- FIDE rating: 2413 (July 2026)
- Peak rating: 2530 (January 2011)

Tejas Bakre (born 12 May 1981, Ahmadabad, India) is an Indian Chess Champion. He acquire Fide Master (FM) title in 1997 and International Master (IM) title in 1999. He was first GM of Gujarat, India. He is Professional Chess Coach and FIDE Senior Trainer (2022).

== Notable tournaments ==
Tournament Name	Year	ELO	Points
Edmonton Invitational 2015(Edmonton CAN)	2015	2438	8.5
FSGM Nov 2012(Budapest HUN)	2012	2481	7.0
Oberwart op 27th(Oberwart)	2005	2467	7.0
Sharjah IM(Sharjah)	2003	2434	3.0
Cairnhill op 20th(Singapore)	2002	2452	5.5
Budapest FS12 GM-A(Budapest)	2000	2446	9.5
