= Masoud Mosadeghpour =

Iranian chess grandmaster (born 1997)

Personal information
- Born: December 3, 1997 (age 28) Mashhad, Iran

Chess career
- Country: Iran
- Title: Grandmaster (2017)
- FIDE rating: 2416 (July 2026)
- Peak rating: 2542 (March 2019)

Masoud Mosadeghpour is an Iranian chess grandmaster.

== Chess career ==
In November 2015, Mosadeghpour won the U18 section of the World Youth Chess Championship.

In May 2016, Mosadeghpour played for Iran at the Asian Team Chess Championship, alongside Sarasadat Khademalsharieh, Atousa Pourkashiyan, Ehsan Ghaem Maghami, Mitra Hejazipour, and Alireza Firouzja.

In January 2019, Mosadeghpour was the sole leader of the Delhi International Open with two rounds to go. He ultimately finished second to Levan Pantsulaia.

In July 2023, Mosadeghpour tied with Nikita Khoroshev and Aradhya Garg in the Issykkul Open 2023, with a score of 7/10. He finished third due to tiebreak results.
