= Subbaraman Meenakshi =

Indian chess player (born 1981)

Personal information
- Born: 24 October 1981 (age 44) New Delhi, India

Chess career
- Country: India
- Title: Woman Grandmaster (2004)
- FIDE rating: 2171 (March 2020)
- Peak rating: 2357 (July 2009)

Subbaraman Meenakshi (born 24 October 1981) is an Indian chess player who received the FIDE title of Woman Grandmaster (WGM) in 2004.

== Biography ==
Subbaraman Meenakshi is youngest sister of the Indian chess Woman Grandmaster Subbaraman Vijayalakshmi. From 1991 to 2001, she represented India in Asia and World Youth Chess Championships in different age categories. In 1998, in Asian Youth Chess Championships Subbaraman Meenakshi won the silver medal in the U20 girls age group, but in 2001, shared 2nd-3rd place with Tania Sachdev in this tournament. In 2000, she won silver medal in the Indian Women's Chess Championship. In 2002, in the FIDE World Cup she reached the quarterfinal, where she lost Xu Yuhua. In 2004, in Beirut Subbaraman Meenakshi won silver medal in Asian Women's Chess Championship.

In 2000s Subbaraman Meenakshi participated in Women's World Chess Championship by knock-out system:

- In Women's World Chess Championship 2000 in the first round lost to Elena Zaiatz,
- In Women's World Chess Championship 2004 in the first round lost to Iweta Radziewicz,
- In Women's World Chess Championship 2006 in the first round lost to Tatiana Kosintseva,
- In Women's World Chess Championship 2010 in the first round lost to Maia Chiburdanidze.

Subbaraman Meenakshi played for India:

- in Women's Chess Olympiad participated 3 times (2000–2002, 2010);
- in Women's Asian Team Chess Championship participated in 2003 and won individual bronze medal;
- in Asian Games participated in 2003;
- in Asian Indoor Games participated in 2007 and won team silver medal.

In 2001, she was awarded the FIDE Woman International Master (WIM) title and received the FIDE Woman Grandmaster (WGM) title three years later.
