= Chess Players Association of India =

- Abbreviation: CPAI
- Formation: June 1, 2004; 22 years ago
- Headquarters: Salt Lake City, Kolkata
- Region served: India
- Affiliations: All India Chess Federation
- Website: http://www.cpai.in/

Chess Players Association of India (CPAI) is an association of chess players in India affiliated to the All India Chess Federation. The objective of this association is to serve a common forum for players for Indian chess players and promote the game in particular.

== History ==
The CPAI had formed to protest a 10% prize money cut imposed on the players by the All India Chess Federation in mid-2004. The association has stuck ever since catering to the needs of the players and forming a group to protect the rights of the Indian chess players
