= Sriram Jha =

Indian chess grandmaster (born 1976)

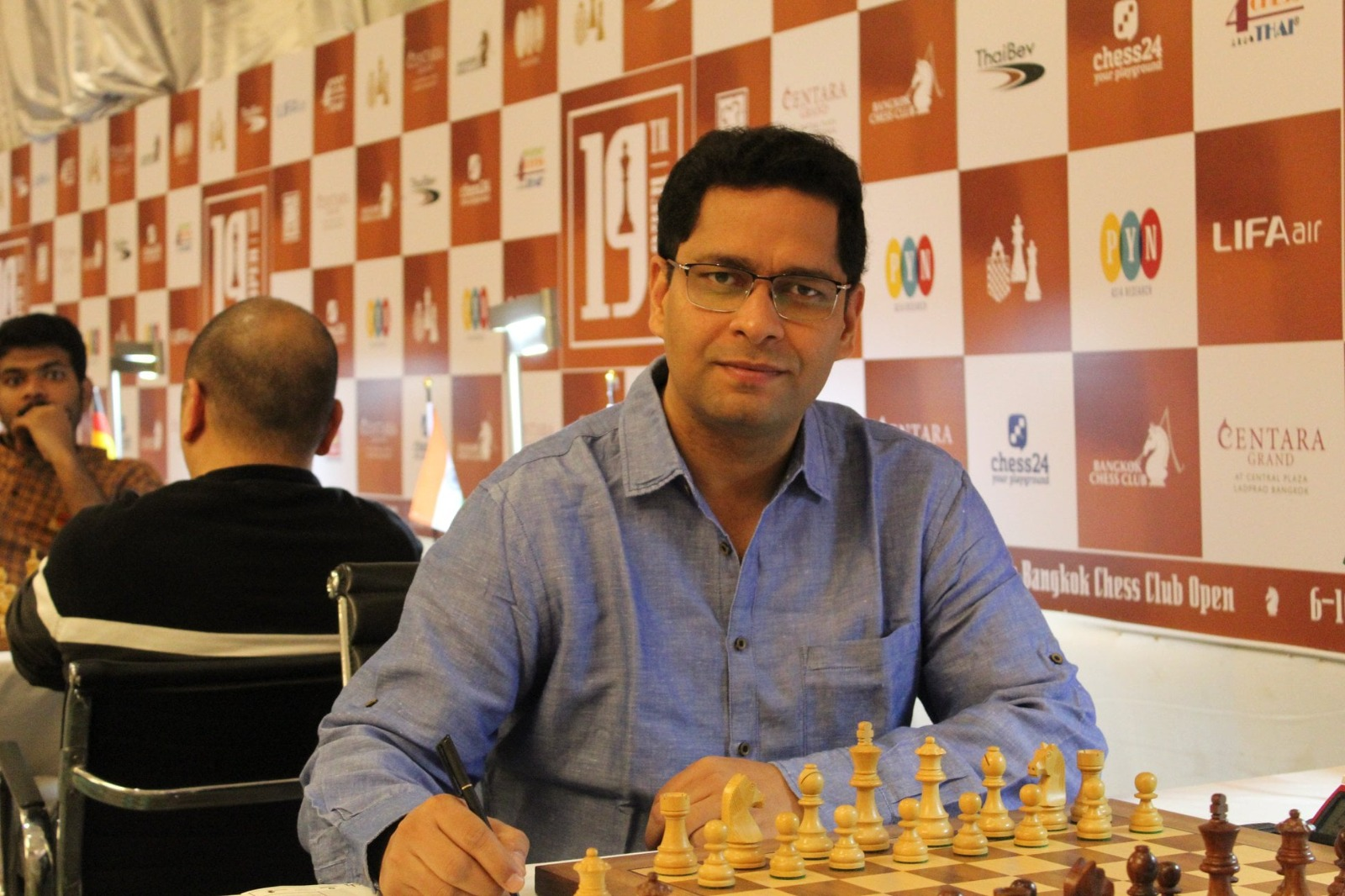
- Sriram Jha, Bangkok 2019

Personal information
- Born: 18 July 1976 (age 50) Madhubani, Bihar, India
- Spouse: Subbaraman Vijayalakshmi

Chess career
- Country: India
- Title: Grandmaster (2010)
- Peak rating: 2511 (January 2010)

Sriram Jha (born 18 July 1976) is an Indian chess Grandmaster. He competed in the FIDE World Cup 2009, for which he qualified by winning the Asian Zone 3.2 Chess Championship earlier in the same year. Sriram Jha played for the bronze medal-winning India's C team in the Asian Team Chess Championship in 2003. In 2014 he won the Indian championship of rapid chess.

In 2005, he married to Indian chess International Master Subbaraman Vijayalakshmi.
