= Karthikeyan Pandian =

Indian chess grandmaster (born 1990)

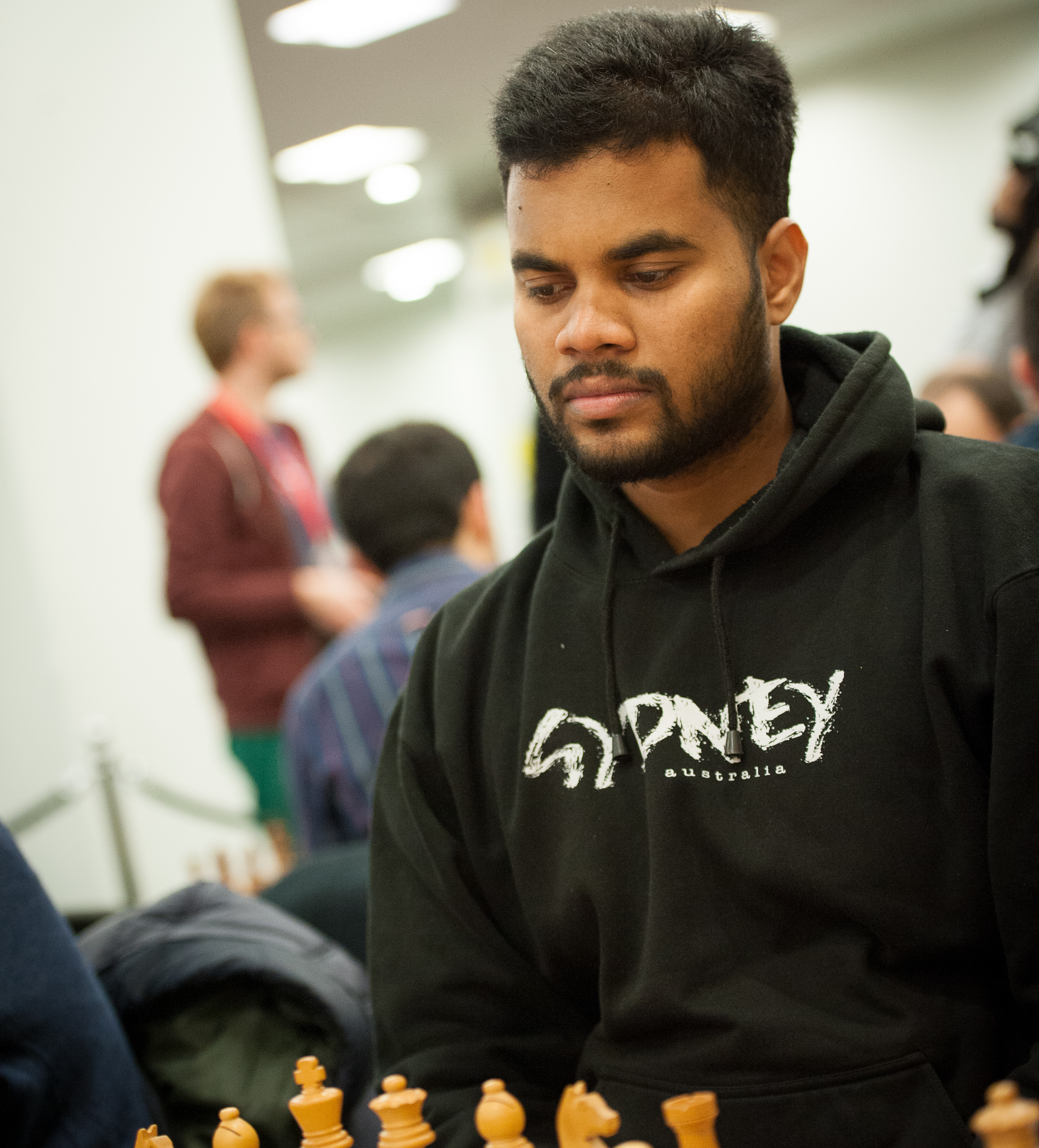

Personal information
- Born: 14 June 1990 (age 36) Chennai, Tamil Nadu, India
- Spouse: Harini Sankaran (m. 2013)

Chess career
- Country: India
- Title: Grandmaster (2019)
- Peak rating: 2507 (March 2017)

Karthikeyan Pandian (born 14 June 1990) is an Indian chess grandmaster.

== Career ==
In June 2018, Karthikeyan won the Commonwealth Chess Championship, finishing with an undefeated score of 7.5/9.

In November 2018, he achieved his final GM norm at Third Saturday tournament in Novi Sad, Serbia, becoming the 57th grandmaster of India.

In August 2023, he was defeated by Balkishan Anand in the biggest upset of the first round of the Indian National Chess Championship.

He is also a chess coach, and has coached Indian super-grandmaster Gukesh D.

== Personal life ==
Karthikeyan is married to fellow chess player Harini Sankaran. They have a son born in 2015.
