= Abhijeet Gupta =

Indian chess grandmaster (born 1989)

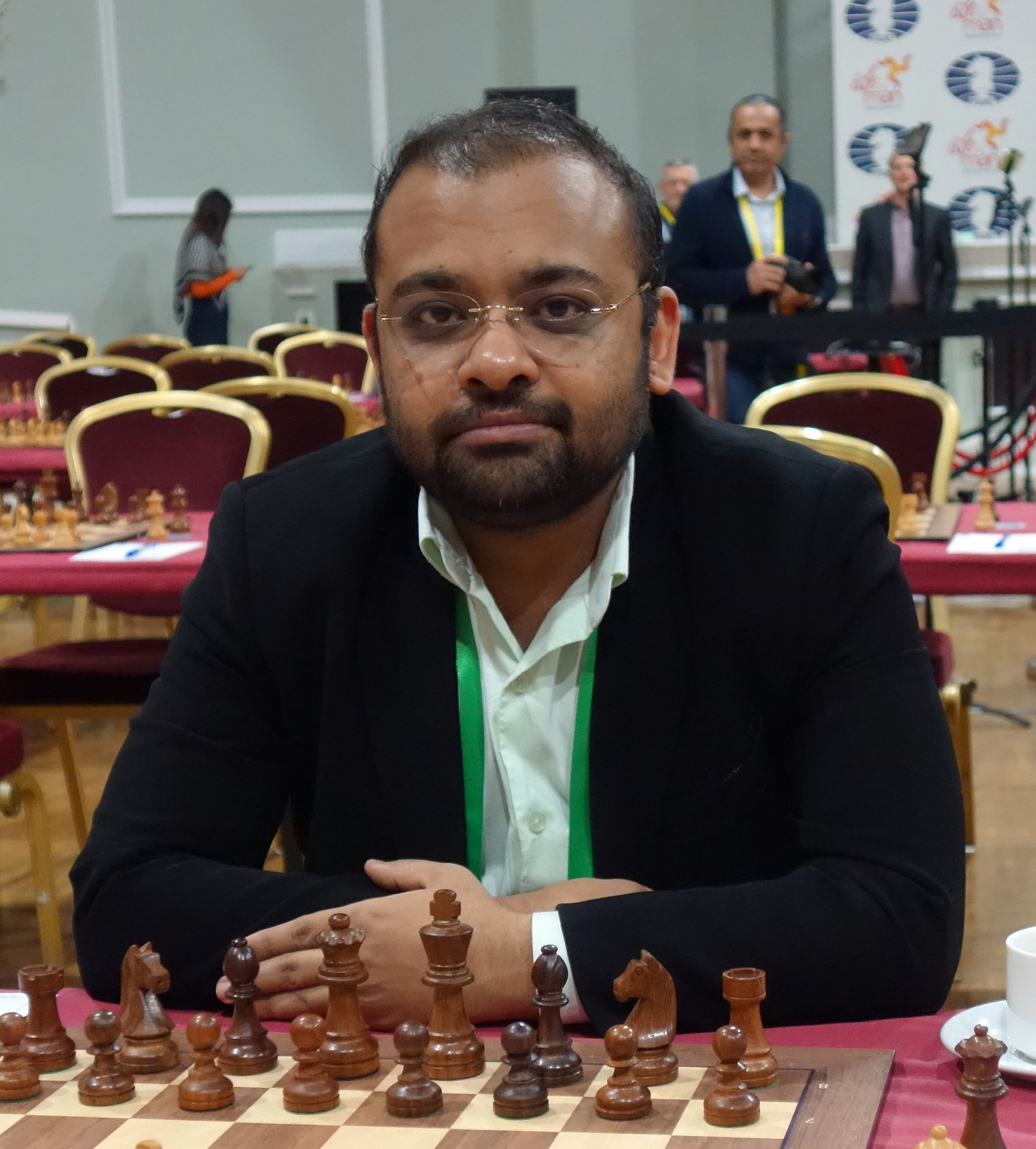
- Abhijeet Gupta in 2023

Personal information
- Born: 16 October 1989 (age 37) Bhilwara, Rajasthan, India

Chess career
- Country: India
- Title: Grandmaster (2008)
- FIDE rating: 2549 (October 2026)
- Peak rating: 2667 (October 2012)
- Peak ranking: No. 83 (October 2012)

Abhijeet Gupta (born 16 October 1989) is an Indian chess player with the title of Grandmaster (GM). Gupta is the first player to win the Commonwealth Chess Championship five times. He completed his early education from A's Steward Senior Secondary School, Bhilwara before embarking upon his career as a chess player.

== Chess career ==
He achieved the norms required for the GM title at the Andorra Open 2006, New Delhi (Parswnath) 2007 and Balaguer 2007 tournaments. On 15 August 2008, he won the World Junior Chess Championship in Gaziantep, Turkey, ahead of many other strong players, including Maxim Rodshtein, David Howell and Hou Yifan. He is the third Indian to win this prestigious championship, after Viswanathan Anand and Pentala Harikrishna. In the same year, he also won the 6th Parsvnath Open in New Delhi. In 2011, he came first in the 13th Dubai Open Chess Championship and in the Indian National Premier Chess Championship. In 2013 Gupta won the Commonwealth Chess Championship and the Al Ain Chess Classic tournament. In the same year he received the Arjuna award for his achievements. Gupta took clear first in the 8th Georgy Agzamov Memorial, held in Tashkent in May 2014. He won the Commonwealth championship again in 2015 and later that year the Hoogeveen Open. In 2016, Gupta won the Reykjavik Open and his third Commonwealth championship title in Kalutara, Sri Lanka. In 2020, Gupta won the 8th Delhi international open with a score of 8.5/10.

Abhijeet Gupta played for the Indian national team in the 2012 Chess Olympiad in Istanbul, Turkey, where he won an individual silver medal thanks to his performance rating of 2746 on board 4.
