= Devaki Prasad =

Indian chess player

Personal information
- Born: 16 June 1962 (age 64)

Chess career
- Country: India
- Title: International Master (1986)
- Peak rating: 2480 (January 1993)

Devaki V. Prasad (born 16 June 1962) is an Indian chess player who holds the title of International Master (IM). The title was awarded to him in 1986.

He is a two-time Indian Chess Championship winner (1990, 1991), Commonwealth Chess Championship winner (1986), Asian Team Chess Championships medalist (1986, 1987, 1999), and FIDE Trainer (2019). In 1987, he was awarded the Arjuna Award by the Government of India because of his chess achievements.

== Biography ==
Prasad hails from Karnataka, which he represents in national championships. Devaki Prasad twice in row won the Indian Chess Championship: in 1990 in Kozhikode and in 1991 in Pondicherry. In 1986, in London he won Commonwealth Chess Championship. In 1987, in Subotica he participated in World Chess Championship Interzonal tournament and ranked in 15th place but won two grandmasters - Mikhail Tal and Lev Alburt.

Devaki Prasad played for India in the Chess Olympiads:

- In 1986, at second board in the 27th Chess Olympiad in Dubai (+2, =4, -3),
- In 1988, at fourth board in the 28th Chess Olympiad in Thessaloniki (+5, =2, -4),
- In 1990, at third board in the 29th Chess Olympiad in Novi Sad (+2, =6, -4),
- In 1992, at first reserve board in the 30th Chess Olympiad in Manila (+4, =2, -4),
- In 1996, at second board in the 32nd Chess Olympiad in Yerevan (+3, =2, -5),
- In 2000, at first reserve board in the 34th Chess Olympiad in Istanbul (+1, =4, -0).

Devaki Prasad played for India in the Men's Asian Team Chess Championships:

- In 1986, at reserve board in the 6th Asian Team Chess Championship in Dubai (+6, =1, -1) and won team and individual silver medals,
- In 1987, at reserve board in the 7th Asian Team Chess Championship in Singapore (+6, =2, -0) and won team gold medal,
- In 1991, at reserve board in the 9th Asian Team Chess Championship in Penang (+0, =0, -2),
- In 1993, at second board in the 10th Asian Team Chess Championship in Kuala Lumpur (+3, =3, -2),
- In 1999, at fourth board in the 12th Asian Team Chess Championship in Shenyang (+3, =5, -1) and won team bronze medal.

In 1986, he awarded the FIDE International Master (IM) title, and in 2019 he became FIDE Trainer.
