= Ramachandran Ramesh =

Indian chess grandmaster (born 1976)

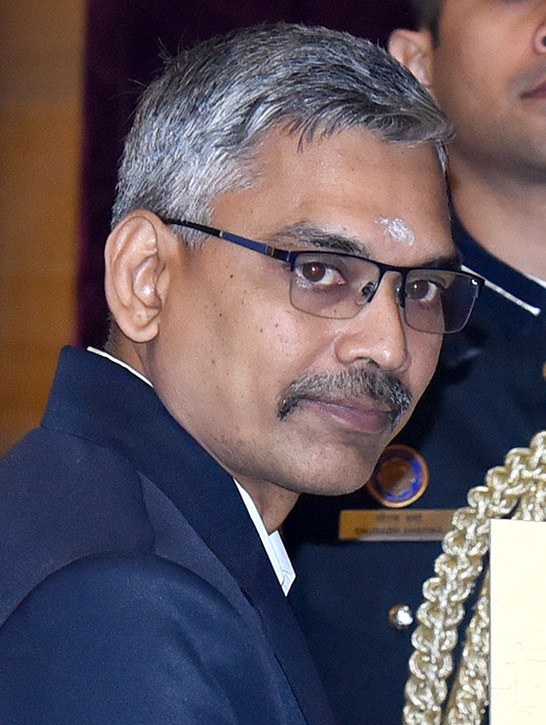
- Ramesh in 2024

Personal information
- Born: 20 April 1976 (age 50) Chennai, Tamil Nadu, India
- Spouse: Aarthie Ramaswamy

Chess career
- Country: India
- Title: Grandmaster (2003)
- FIDE rating: 2472 (October 2026)
- Peak rating: 2507 (April 2006)

Ramachandran Ramesh (born 20 April 1976), also known as R. B. Ramesh, is an Indian chess grandmaster (GM) from Chennai who won the 2002 British Championship and the 2007 Commonwealth Championship.

He is married to WGM Aarthie Ramaswamy. They are India's first grandmaster couple.

He founded Chess Gurukul, Chess Academy in Chennai to train young players in 2008. Since then, Chess Gurukul has produced many international chess champions from India, including R Praggnanandhaa, Bharath Subramaniyam, who became an international master in 2019 at the age of 11 years and 8 months.

Ramesh shot to fame with his commentary in the World Chess Championship Match 2013 Anand – Carlsen, where he was the official commentator along with GM Susan Polgar. He also won the Dronacharya Award in 2023.
