= Vaidyanathan Ravikumar =

Indian chess International Master

Personal information
- Born: 26 December 1959 (age 66)

Chess career
- Country: India
- Title: International Master (1978)

Vaidyanathan Ravikumar (born 26 December 1959) is an Indian chess International Master. He became India's second International Master in 1978, after Manuel Aaron.

== Early life and chess career ==
Ravikumar was born on 26 December 1959. He emerged as one of India's leading junior players during the 1970s.

In 1978, Ravikumar won the Asian Junior Chess Championship in Tehran. He subsequently became India's second International Master, after Manuel Aaron.

Ravikumar competed in the World Junior Chess Championship in 1978 and 1979. He later represented India at the Chess Olympiad in 1980 and 1984.

== Chess Olympiads ==
Ravikumar represented India at two Chess Olympiads. At the 24th Chess Olympiad in Valletta, Malta, he played on the Indian team. He also represented India at the 26th Chess Olympiad in Thessaloniki, Greece.

== Later career ==
Ravikumar later worked as a chess coach. He served as the national coach of the United Arab Emirates and was also involved in junior chess development in England.
