= M. R. Lalith Babu =

Indian chess grandmaster (born 1993)

Lalit Babu M R
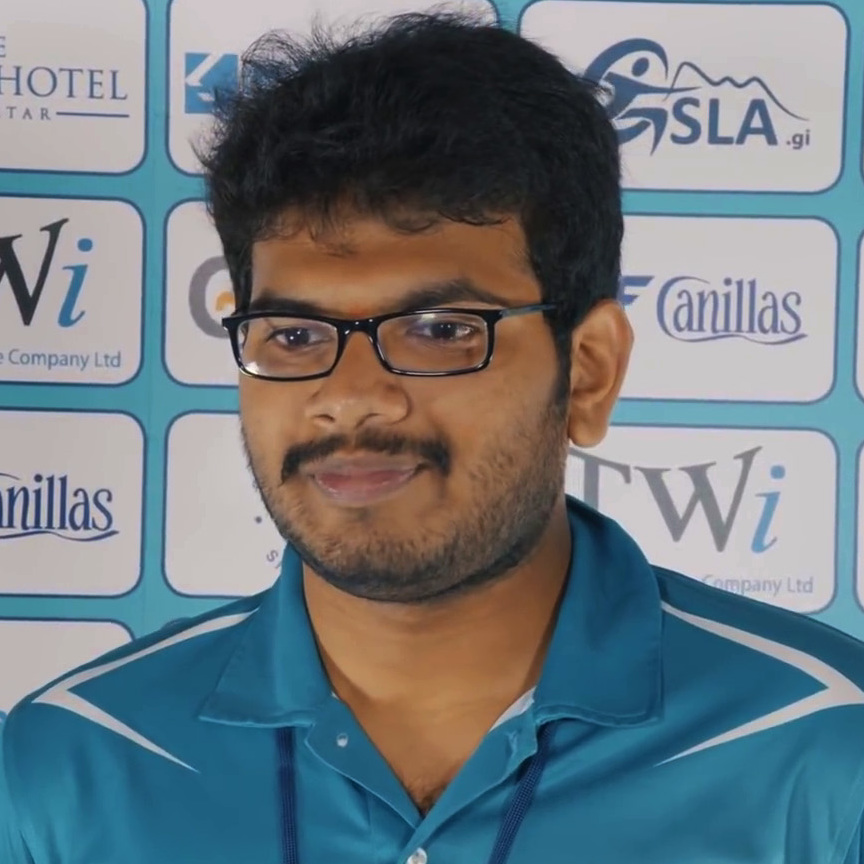
- Lalit at the 2017 National Chess Championship

Personal information
- Born: 5 January 1993 (age 33) Vijayawada, Andhra Pradesh, India

Chess career
- Country: India
- Title: Grandmaster (2012)
- FIDE rating: 2489 (September 2026)
- Peak rating: 2594 (March 2019)

Musunuri Rohit Lalit Babu (born 5 January 1993) is an Indian chess player. He was awarded the title of Grandmaster by FIDE in 2012. He is the 4th GrandMaster from Andhra Pradesh, part of the team that won India's first bronze medal in the 41st Chess Olympiad in 2014, Commonwealth gold medalist, Asian silver medalist, won the Indian Chess Championship in 2017, and Limca Book record holder. He has won 20 individual gold, 15 individual silver and 14 individual bronze medals in National as well as international tournaments.

== Biography ==
He was born in Vijayawada, Krishna District, Andhra Pradesh. Lalith Babu took the silver medal at the Asian Junior Chess Championship in 2008 and as a result he was awarded the title of International Master. He achieved the title of Grandmaster after scoring norms at Balaguer in October 2008, Chennai Open in 2010 and Hastings Masters in 2012.

He won the Leiden chess tournament in the Netherlands in 2009. The following year, Lalith Babu took the bronze medal at the Parsvnath Commonwealth Championship in New Delhi. He won the Commonwealth Chess Championship in 2012 at Chennai and won the Chennai Super Kings International Grandmaster tournament in 2013 on tiebreak over Lu Shanglei.

In 2014, he played on the Indian national team in the 41st Chess Olympiad in Tromsø, Norway winning the team bronze medal. He won the 55th National Premier Chess Championship of India, held in Patna in November 2017, to become the Indian national chess champion. He went on winning the National rapid 2018 championship and finished second in the National blitz. Lalith Babu he won the SCO Open, held from the 14 to the 22 October 2018 in the town of Xingtai, Hebei, China.
