= Abhijit Kunte =

Indian chess grandmaster (born 1977)

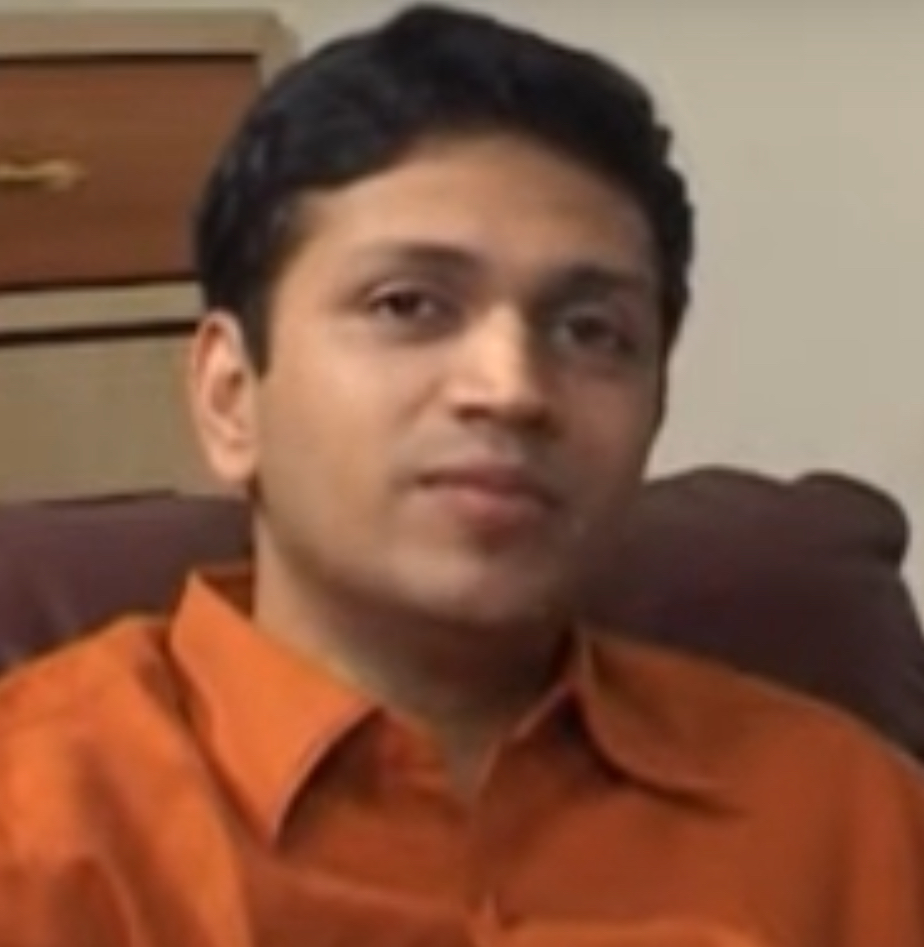
- Kunte in 2015

Personal information
- Born: 3 March 1977 (age 49) Pune, India

Chess career
- Country: India
- Title: Grandmaster (2000)
- FIDE rating: 2458 (October 2026)
- Peak rating: 2568 (January 2001)

Abhijit Kunte (born 3 March 1977) is an Indian chess player from Pune who holds the FIDE title of Grandmaster.

== Biography ==
He has participated many times in the Indian Chess Championship, winning two gold medals (1997, 2000) and four bronze medals (1999, 2001, 2003, 2005). He won the British Chess Championship at Edinburgh in 2003, and two medals in the Commonwealth Chess Championship (took 2nd, behind Krishnan Sasikiran, at Sangli 2000, and 3rd at Mumbai 2003, Nguyen Anh Dung won off contest).

Kunte has represented India four times at Chess Olympiads (1998–2004), and won seven medals in the Asian Team Chess Championship (team bronze medal in 1999, two team and individual silver medals in 2003, team gold and bronze individual medals in 2005, team silver and individual bronze medals in 2008).

In 2000, he played in the Single-elimination tournament for the World Chess Championship (New Delhi/Tehran) where he lost a knockout match to Gilberto Milos. In 2007, he took the bronze medal at Cebu City's Asian Chess Championship (Zhang Pengxiang was the winner), and played in the Chess World Cup 2007 (Khanty-Mansiysk) where he lost a knockout match to Vadim Zviagintsev).

He won or shared 1st at Kolkata (Calcutta) 1998, Blackpool 2003, Kolkata 2004, New Delhi 2005, Guelph 2005, Kitchener 2006 and Mumbai (Bombay) 2008.

He was awarded the Grandmaster title in 2000.
