= Dibyendu Barua =

Indian chess grandmaster (born 1966)

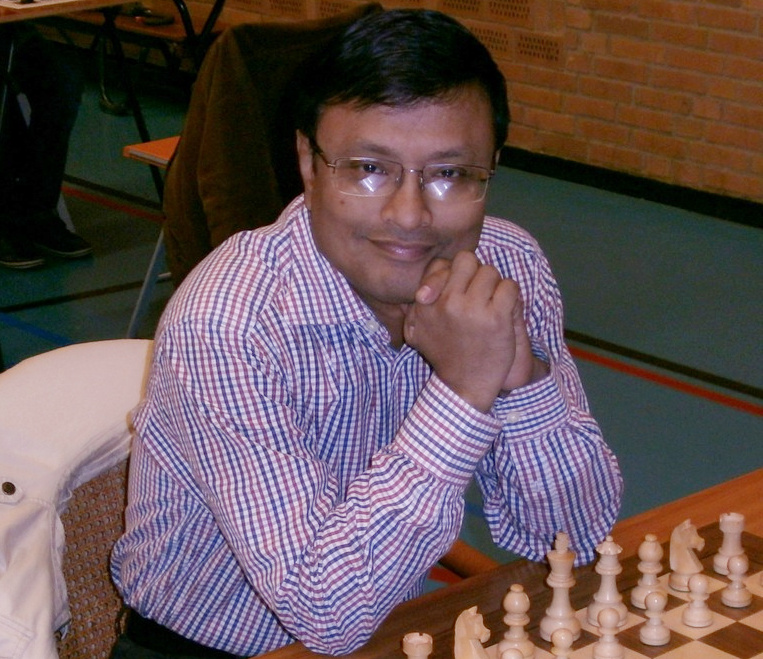
- Barua in 2012

Personal information
- Born: 27 October 1966 (age 59) Chittagong, East Pakistan (present-day Bangladesh)
- Spouse: Saheli Dhar-Barua (m. 1997)

Chess career
- Country: India
- Title: Grandmaster (1991)
- Peak rating: 2561 (July 2003)

Dibyendu Barua (born 27 October 1966) is an Indian chess grandmaster. He is a three-time Indian Chess Champion. He was the second Indian chess player, after Viswanathan Anand, second Bengali after Niaz Murshed, and third South Asian after Niaz and Anand to achieve the title of chess grandmaster. He also serves as the vice-president of the All India Chess Federation, and the president of the Sara Bangla Daba Sangstha ("All Bengal Chess Association").

== Chess career ==
Barua was born in Chittagong, from where his family migrated to Kolkata in the Indian state of West Bengal when he was a baby. His father Benoy Barua operated a printing business and supported his son's chess career at the youth level and state championships. In 1978, Barua, as a 12-year-old, became the youngest participant in the Indian Chess Championship. In 1982, Barua defeated the then-world number two ranked Viktor Korchnoi in the Lloyd's Bank Tournament in London.

In 1983, he became the youngest national champion, a record that was beaten by a few months by Viswanathan Anand in 1986. He has since won it twice more, in 1998 and 2001. He won the Arjuna Award in 1983 after winning the nationals.

Barua won his first Grandmaster norm in the Natwest Trophy in London in September 1989. In the 29th Chess Olympiad in Novi Sad in 1990, Barua won the gold on the second board with a 2644 elo point performance for his second norm. He won his third and final Grandmaster norm in 1991 in the Duncan GM tournament in Kolkata. Barua participated in the World U-14 championship in Mexico in 1979 finishing third and in 1980 finished fourth in the World sub-junior.

== Personal life ==
Barua married the Women International Master Saheli Dhar in 1997. They have a son Dishan Barua, who is also a chess player.
