= Laxman Rajaram =

Indian chess grandmaster (born 1983)

Personal information
- Born: 5 February 1983 (age 43) Alandur, India

Chess career
- Country: India
- Title: Grandmaster (2009)
- Peak rating: 2521 (April 2009)

Laxman Rajaram R. (born 5 February 1983) is an Indian chess grandmaster.

== Career ==
Laxman learned chess from his father Rajaram, and won the Indian Under-12 National Championship in 1993.

In March 2022, he was defeated in an upset by 14-year-old Shivika Rohilla in the Delhi International Grandmasters Chess tournament.

In August 2023, he won the Athens of the East Blitz Rating Open 2023 with a score of 9/10, finishing half a point ahead of second and third-place finishers Ram Aravind L N and Aakash G.

In December 2023, he won the Liberation Cup Rapid Rating Open 2023 with an undefeated score of 7.5/9 ahead of Sharan Rao, Kartavya Anadkat, Nitish Belurkar, and Sammed Shete due to better tiebreaks.

In January 2024, he competed in the Chennai Open International Grandmaster Chess Tournament.
