= Subbaraman Vijayalakshmi =

Indian chess player (born 1979)

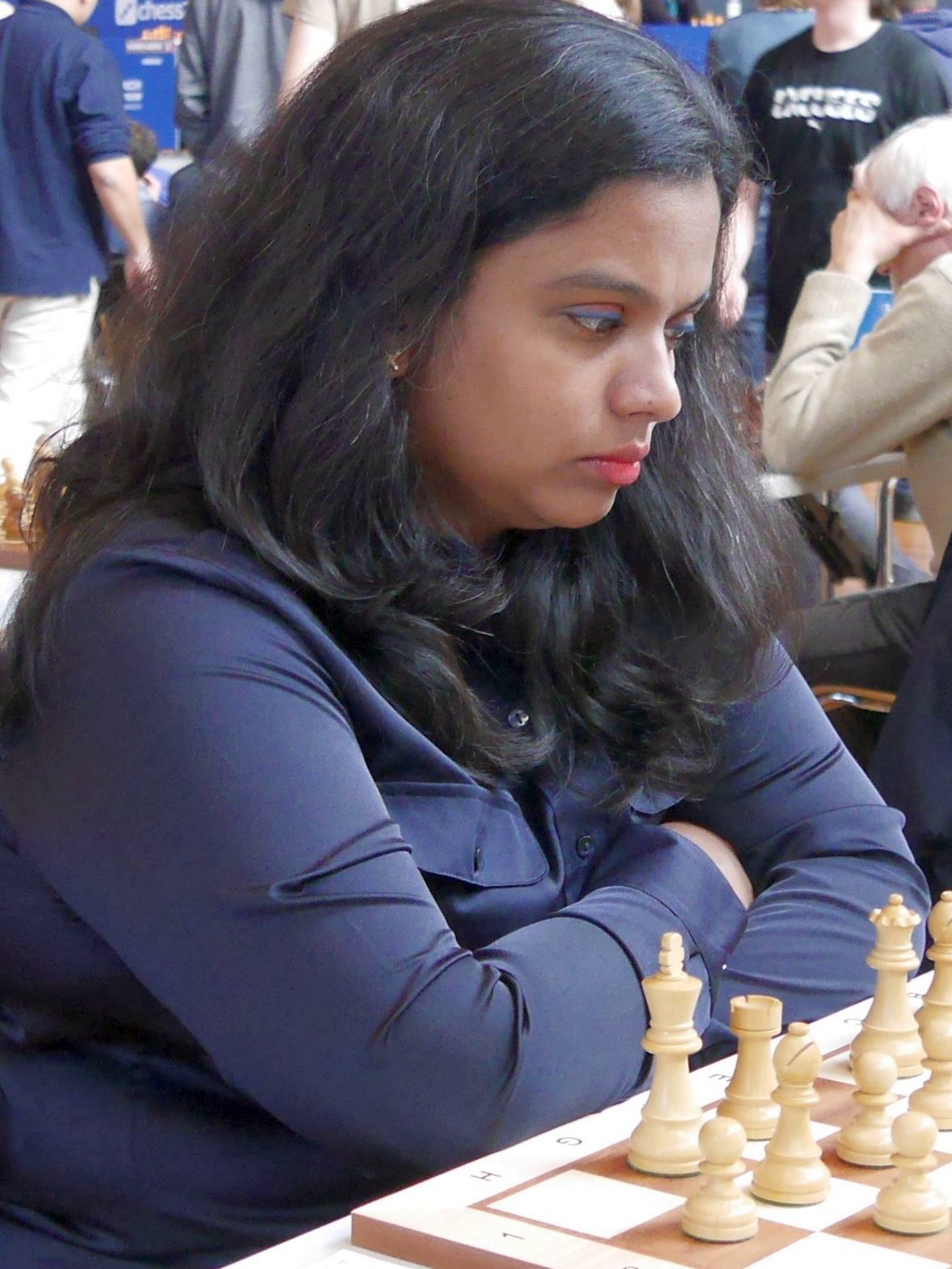
- Subbaraman Vijayalakshmi in 2018

Personal information
- Born: 25 March 1979 (age 47) Madras, India
- Spouse: Sriram Jha

Chess career
- Country: India
- Title: International Master (2001); Woman Grandmaster (2001)
- FIDE rating: 2332 (March 2020)
- Peak rating: 2485 (October 2005)

Subbaraman Vijayalakshmi (born 25 March 1979) is an Indian chess player who holds the FIDE titles of International Master (IM) and Woman Grandmaster (WGM), the first female player in her country to achieve these titles. She has won more medals than any other player for India in the Chess Olympiads. She has won almost all national age group titles, including the senior title.

== Personal life ==
Born in Chennai, she learned the game from her father. She is married to Indian Grandmaster Sriram Jha. Her sisters Subbaraman Meenakshi (born 1981, WGM) and S. Banu Priya are also chess players.

== Career ==
Her first tournament was the Tal Chess Open in 1986. In 1988 and in 1989 she won the Indian championship in the U10 girls category. Also in the U12 category she won twice.

In the Zone tournament in Madras (1995) she finished second. She won the Asian Zone tournament in 1997 in Teheran, and also in 1999 in Mumbai. In 1996 in Kolkata she became Commonwealth women's champion, a title she won again in 2003 in Mumbai. Vijayalakshmi won the Indian Women's Championship in 1995 (Madras), 1996 (Kolkata), 1999 (Kozhikode), 2000 (Mumbai), 2001 (New Delhi) and 2002 (Lakhnau). She took part in the Women's Chess Olympiad with the Indian national team in 1998. At the 34th Chess Olympiad in 2000 in Istanbul she received a silver medal for her performance at board 1, which she repeated in Bled 2002. In 2007, she won the Leonardo di Bona Memorial in Cutro, Italy.

In 1996 she was awarded the Woman International Master (WIM) title thanks to her result at the FIDE Zonal tournament in Chennai. In 2001, she became the first Indian to achieve the title of Woman Grandmaster (WGM). She also holds the title of International Master (IM), thanks to her results at the Chess Olympiad 2000. She is the first female Indian player to become IM. In 2006 in Kalamaria she achieved a Grandmaster norm, and also in 2007 for her victory in Cutro.

In July 2005 she played in the Biel Accentus Ladies Tournament, where she came second with 6½ points, which was the same score as to Almira Skripchenko who beat Vijayalakshmi in the tie-break. In Germany she took part in the LGA Open in 2006 in Nuremberg and in 2006/2007 she played for the Brackweder SC in the NRW competition.

In 2016 Vijayalakshmi tied for 2nd–3rd with Russian grandmaster Boris Grachev in the 8th Chennai Open.

== Awards and recognition ==
In 2001 the Indian government gave her the Arjuna Award.
