= Swati Ghate =

Indian chess player (born 1980)

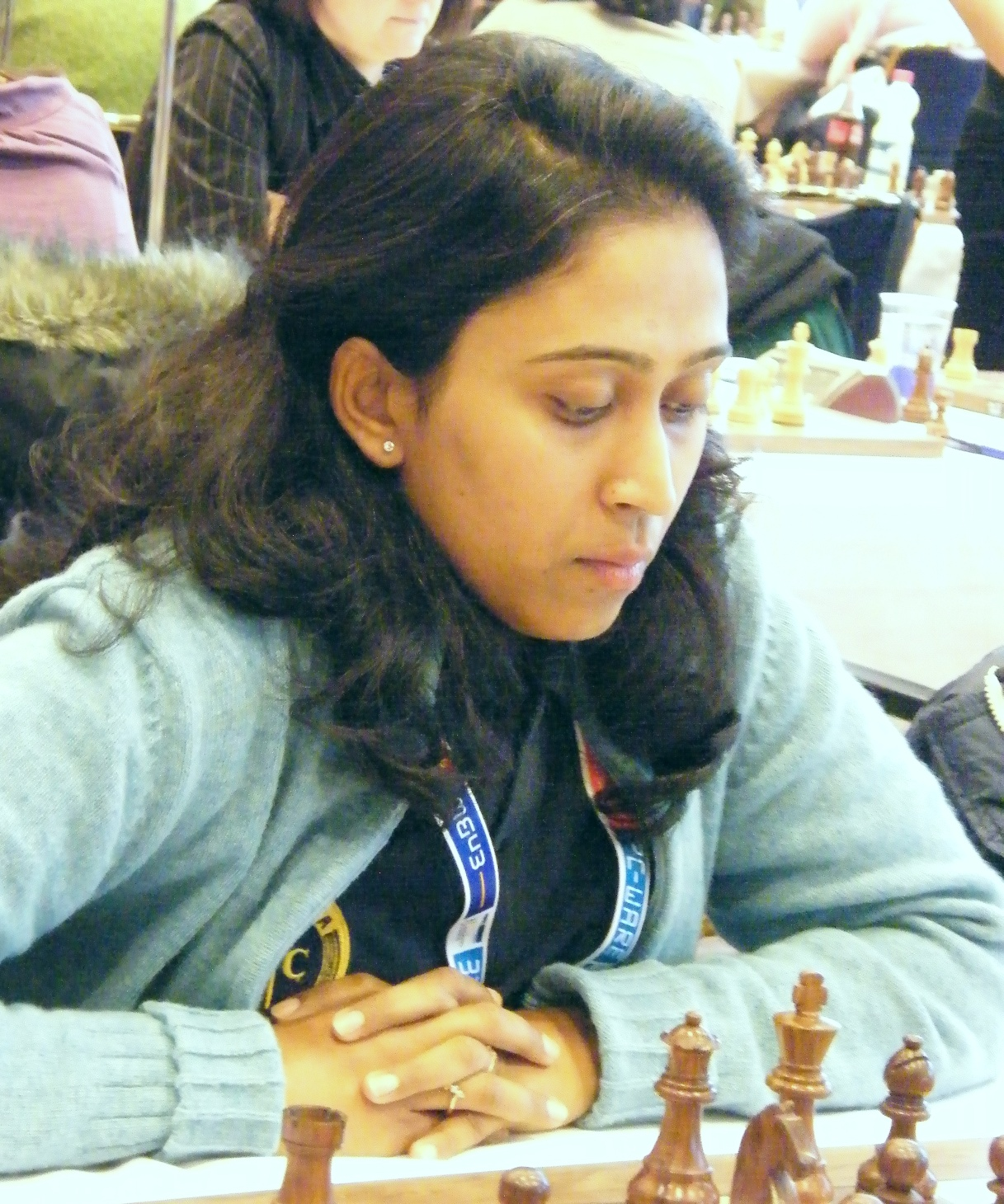
- Ghate in 2008

Personal information
- Born: 16 January 1980 (age 46)

Chess career
- Country: India
- Title: Woman Grandmaster (2004)
- Peak rating: 2385 (October 2006)

Swati Ghate (Marathi: स्वाती घाटे; born 16 January 1980) is an Indian chess player and a Woman Grandmaster.

She is also a winner of the 2006 Indian Women's Chess Championship.
