= Tania Sachdev =

Indian chess player (born 1986)

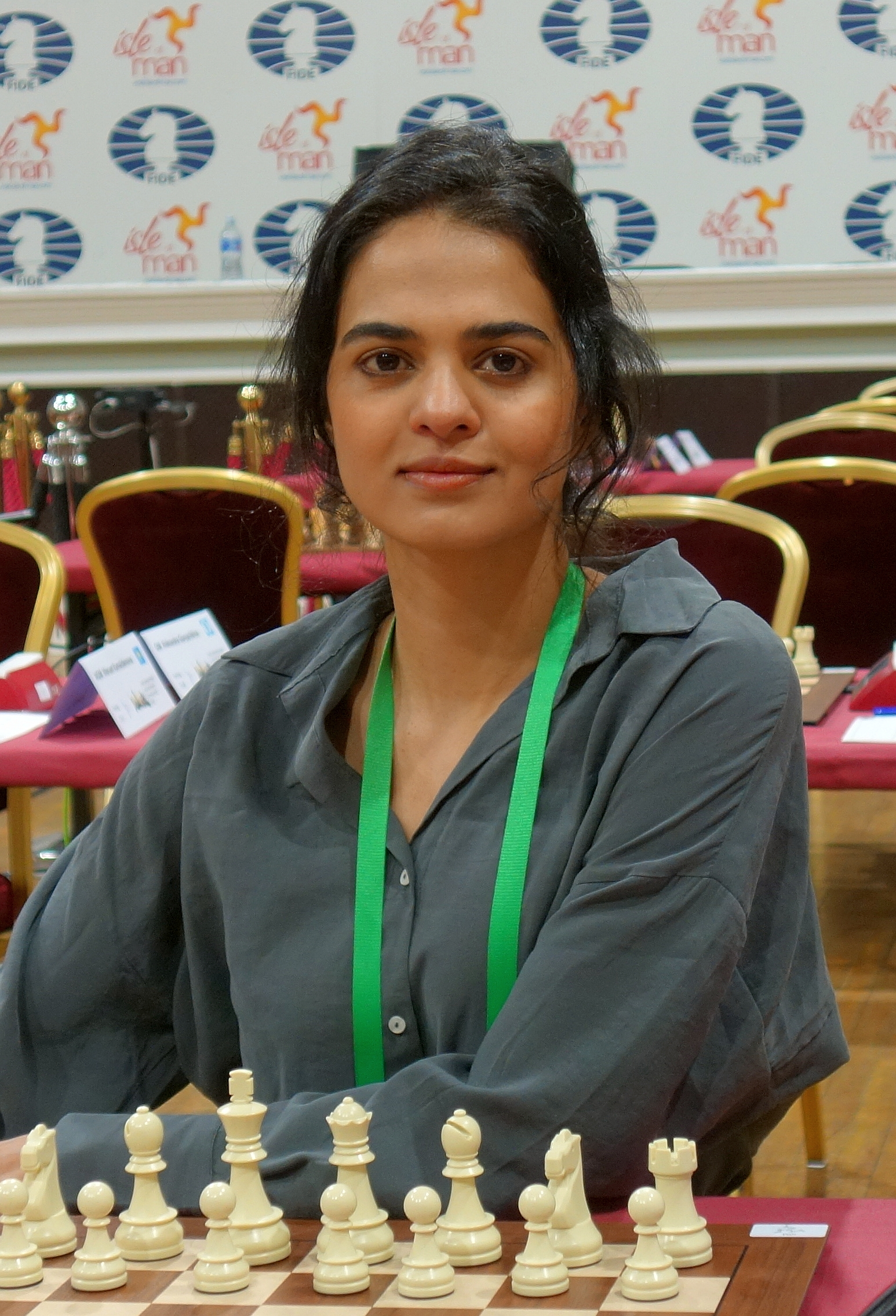
- Sachdev in 2023

Personal information
- Born: 20 August 1986 (age 40) Delhi, India

Chess career
- Country: India
- Title: International Master (2008); Woman Grandmaster (2005)
- Peak rating: 2443 (September 2013)

YouTube information
- Channel: Tania Sachdev
- Years active: 2020–present
- Subscribers: 96 thousand
- Views: 5.7 million
- Last updated: 3 December 2024

Tania Sachdev (born 20 August 1986) is an Indian chess player, who holds the FIDE titles of International Master (IM) and Woman Grandmaster (WGM). She is a two-time Indian women's chess champion in 2006 and 2007, one-time Asian women's chess champion in 2007 and three-time Commonwealth Women's Chess Champion in 2016, 2018, and 2019. She is also a chess presenter and commentator.

== Early years ==
Born in Delhi, Sachdev was introduced to the game by her mother, Anju, at age 6. Her parents provided her with professional training. She achieved her first international title when she was eight. She was coached by K. C. Joshi during her early years. As a child, she won multiple events. Her career successes are under-12 Indian champion, Asian U14 girls' champion in 2000 and bronze medalist at the 1998 World Youth Chess Championships in the Girls U12 division. In 2002, she won the Asian Junior Girls Championship in Marawila.

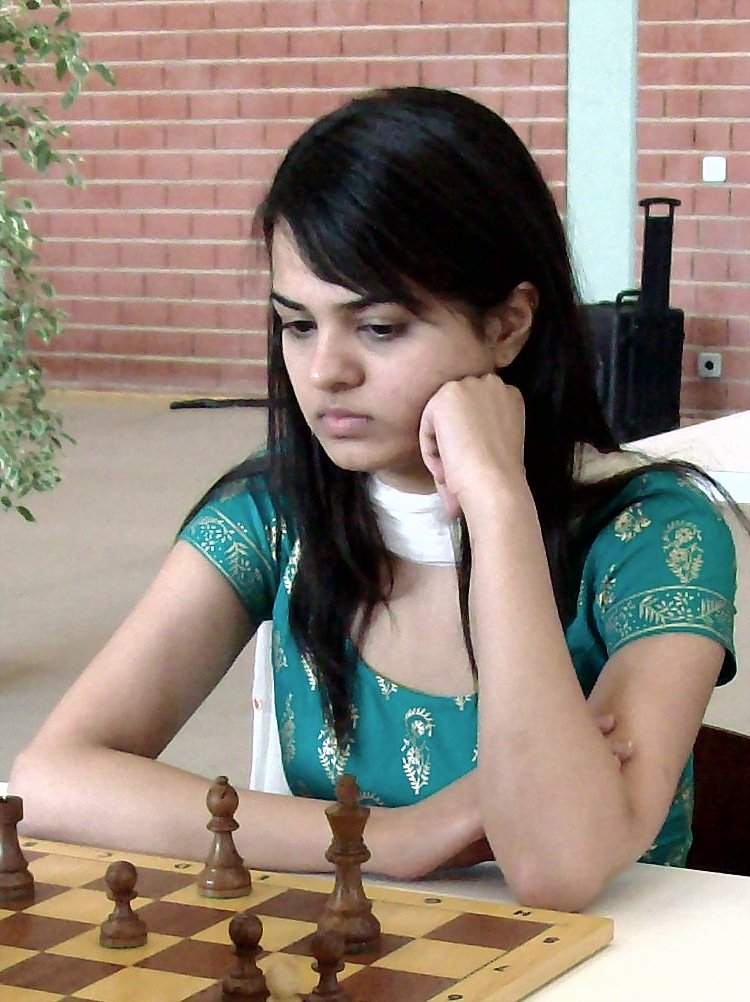
Tania Sachdev, 2008

== Career ==
In 2005, Sachdev became the eighth Indian player to be awarded the Woman Grandmaster title. She won India's National Women's Premier Chess Championship in 2006 and 2007. In 2007, she also won the Women's Asian Chess Championship with 6½ points out of nine rounds in Tehran. She was conferred with the Arjuna Award in 2009. In 2016, Sachdev won the best woman prize at the Reykjavik Open and won the women's Commonwealth champion title in Kalutara.

She has played for the Indian national team in the Women's Chess Olympiads since 2008, the Women's World Team Chess Championship in 2009 and 2011, the Women's Asian Team Chess Championship since 2003, the 2006 Asian Games, and the 2009 Asian Indoor Games. Sachdev won the individual bronze medal for board 3 at the 2012 Women's Chess Olympiad in Istanbul, four team silver medals (in 2008, 2009, 2012, and 2014) and four individual ones (three silver and one bronze) at the Women's Asian Team Championship.

In 2015, Sachdev won a silver medal in the Asian Continental Women's Rapid Chess Championship.

Sachdev has presented a Fritztrainer Strategy DVD for Chessbase and was a member of the official commentary team for the 2013 (Chennai) World Championship Match between Magnus Carlsen and Viswanathan Anand. In July 2019, Sachdev won Commonwealth women's championship and defended her title.

In 2022, Sachdev played for the Indian Women's team that won India's first ever Bronze medal at the Women's Olympiad, she won individual bronze for her performance on Board 4. As part of FIDE's "Year of the Women in Chess" initiative she was awarded "Outstanding influencer/commentator/social media star" prize.

In September 2024, Sachdev was part of the Indian team which won the gold medal in the women's competition at the 45th Chess Olympiad in Budapest, Hungary, the first time the country had taken the Olympiad title. In February 2025, she received the BBC Changemaker of the Year 2024 award.

Sachdev is one of the most prominent, Chess commentators of the 2020s, being part of broadcast panels for World Chess Championship 2023, World Chess Championship 2024, Norway Chess 2025, Norway Chess 2026, Chess.com's Speed Chess Championships, Candidates Tournament 2026, among others.

== Personal life ==
Sachdev completed her schooling at Modern School in Vasant Vihar in Delhi and did her graduation at Sri Venkateswara College.

She married Delhi-based architect Viraj Kataria in November 2014.

Awards and achievements
Preceded by Wang Yu	Women's Asian Chess Champion; 2007	Succeeded by Zhang Xiaowen
