= Mary Ann Gomes =

Indian chess player (born 1989)

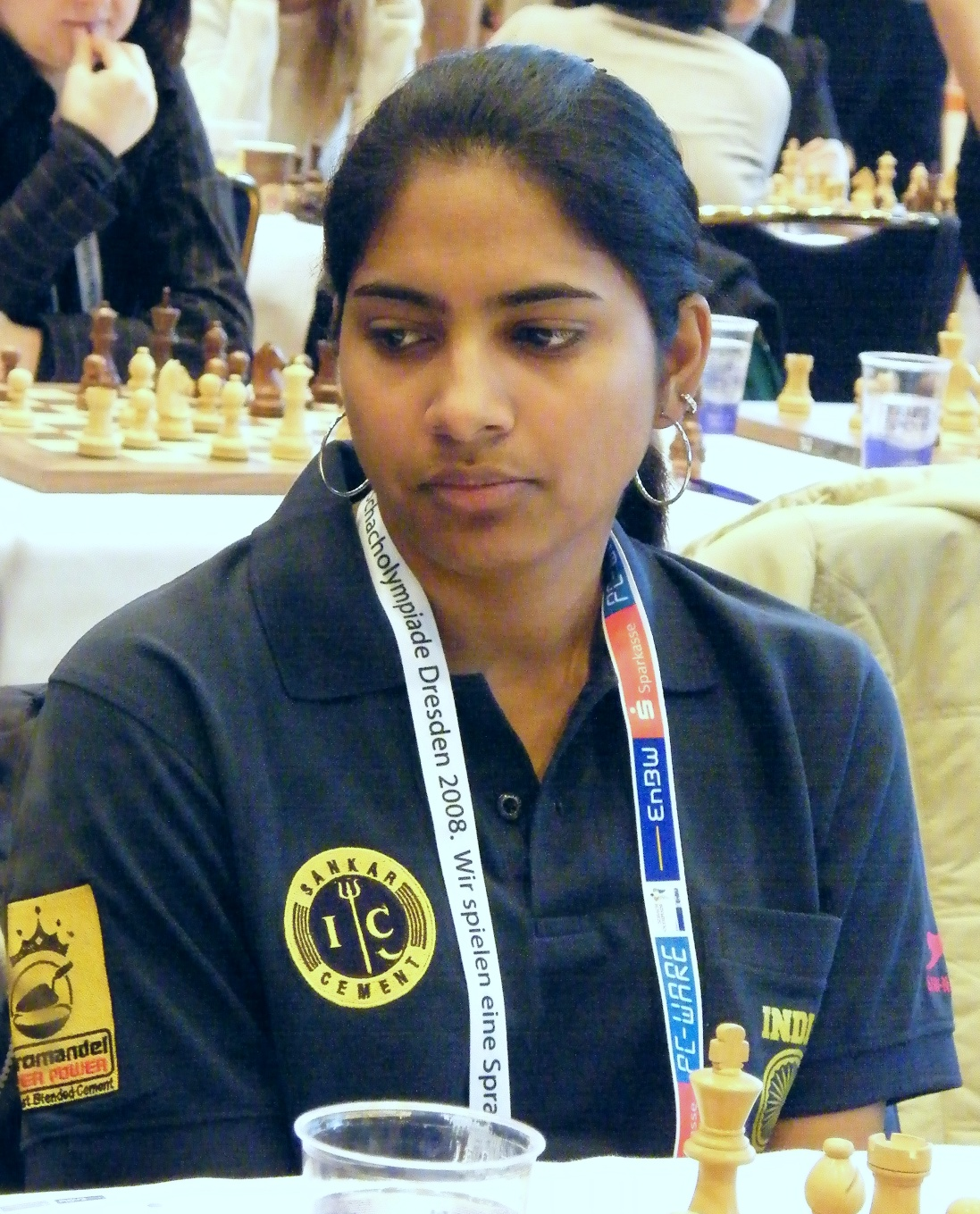
- Dresden, 2008

Personal information
- Born: 19 September 1989 (age 36) Kolkata, India

Chess career
- Country: India
- Title: Woman Grandmaster (2008)
- Peak rating: 2423 (July 2013)

Mary Ann Gomes (born 19 September 1989) is an Indian chess player. She was awarded the title of Woman Grandmaster (WGM) by FIDE in 2008. She won the women's edition of National Premier Chess Championship in 2011, 2012 and 2013 consecutively.

Gomes was born in Kolkata. She won the Girls Under 10 title at the 1999 Asian Youth Chess Championships in Ahmedabad. In 2005, she won the Asian Under 16 Girls Championship in Namangan, Uzbekistan. She won the Asian Junior (Under 20) Girls Championship in 2006, 2007 and 2008. Gomes won three times the Women's Indian Chess Championship, in 2011, 2012 and 2013. She also won three times the Women's Asian Junior Chess Championship in 2006, 2007 and 2008.
