= Women's event at the 44th Chess Olympiad =

2022 Chess tournament

- Host city: Mahabalipuram, Chennai
- Country: India
- Nations: 160
- Teams: 162
- Athletes: 800
- Dates: 29 July – 9 August 2022
- Main venue: Four Points by Sheraton

Medalists

Team
- 1st place, gold medalist(s): Ukraine
- 2nd place, silver medalist(s): Georgia
- 3rd place, bronze medalist(s): India

Individual
- Board 1: (Sweden) Pia Cramling
- Board 2: (Georgia (country)) Nino Batsiashvili
- Board 3: (Poland) Oliwia Kiołbasa
- Board 4: (Mongolia) Bat-Erdene Mungunzul
- Reserve: (Germany) Jana Schneider

The women's event at the 44th Chess Olympiad was held from 29 July to 9 August 2022. It was contested by a record number of 162 teams, representing 160 nations. India, as host nation, fielded three teams. A total of 799 players participated in the women's event.

Ukraine won the gold medal in the Women's event to claim their second gold in the Women's event after having previously won the event in 2006. Polish player Oliwia Kiołbasa had the highest individual score in the Women's event, scoring 9½ of a possible 11 points with a performance rating of 2565. Other players who won individual gold medals include Pia Cramling of Sweden on board one with 9½ out of 11 and a performance rating of 2532, Nino Batsiashvili of Georgia on board two who scored 7½ out of 10 with a performance rating of 2504, Bat-Erdene Mungunzul of Mongolia on board four who scored 7½ out of 10 with a performance rating of 2460, and Jana Schneider of Germany as a reserve player with 9 out of 10 points and a performance rating of 2414.

== Competition format and calendar ==
The tournament was played in a Swiss system format. The time control for all games was 90 minutes for the first 40 moves, after which an additional 30 minutes were granted and increment of 30 seconds per move was applied from the first move. Players were permitted to offer a draw at any time. A total of 11 rounds were played, with all teams playing in every round.

In each round, four players from each team faced four players from another team; teams were permitted one reserve player who could be substituted between rounds. The four games were played simultaneously on four boards, scoring 1 game point for a win and ½ game point for a draw. The scores from each game were summed together to determine which team won the round. Winning a round was worth 2 match points, regardless of the game point margin, while drawing a round was worth one match point. Teams were ranked in a table based on match points. Tie-breakers for the table were i) the Sonneborn-Berger system; ii) total game points scored; iii) the sum of the match points of the opponents, excluding the lowest one.

Tournament rounds started on 29 July and ended with the final round on 9 August. All rounds began at 15:00 IST (UTC+5:30), except for the final round which began at 10:00 IST (UTC+5:30). There was one rest day at the tournament—on 4 August—after the sixth round.

All dates are IST (UTC+5:30)

1	Round	RD	Rest day

July/August	29th Fri	30th Sat	31st Sun	1st Mon	2nd Tue	3rd Wed	4th Thu	5th Fri	6th Sat	7th Sun	8th Mon	9th Tue
Tournament round	1	2	3	4	5	6	RD	7	8	9	10	11

== Teams and players ==
The Women's event was contested by a record number of 162 teams, representing 160 nations. India, as host nation, fields three teams.

The women's tournament was short of seven out of the ten top players according to the FIDE rating list published in July 2022, with only the Muzychuk sisters—former Women's World Champion Mariya and Anna—and Nana Dzagnidze participating. The highest rated player in the world Hou Yifan, the current Women's World Champion Ju Wenjun and the former Women's World Champion Tan Zhongyi were missing the Olympiad due to China's withdrawal, whereas former Women's World Champion Alexandra Kosteniuk and top-ten rated Alexandra Goryachkina and Kateryna Lagno did not play because of Russia's suspension. Former Women's World Champions Anna Ushenina played for her native Ukraine.

The absence of Russia and China, which had together won the gold medal at nine out of the eleven last Olympiads, put the host nation India as the first seed with an average rating of 2486. The team consisted of Humpy Koneru and Harika Dronavalli on the top boards, as well as R Vaishali, Tania Sachdev and Bhakti Kulkarni. Ukraine with the Muzychuk sisters, Anna Ushenina, Nataliya Buksa and Iulija Osmak had an average rating of 2478 as second-seeded team, while Georgia with Nana Dzagnidze, Lela Javakhishvili, Nino Batsiashvili, Meri Arabidze and Salome Melia came in third place with an average pre-tournament rating of 2475 points. Other contenders for a medal included Poland with Alina Kashlinskaya, who switched from the Russian to the Polish Chess Federation, playing on board one, France led by Marie Sebag on the top board, Azerbaijan, the United States and Germany.

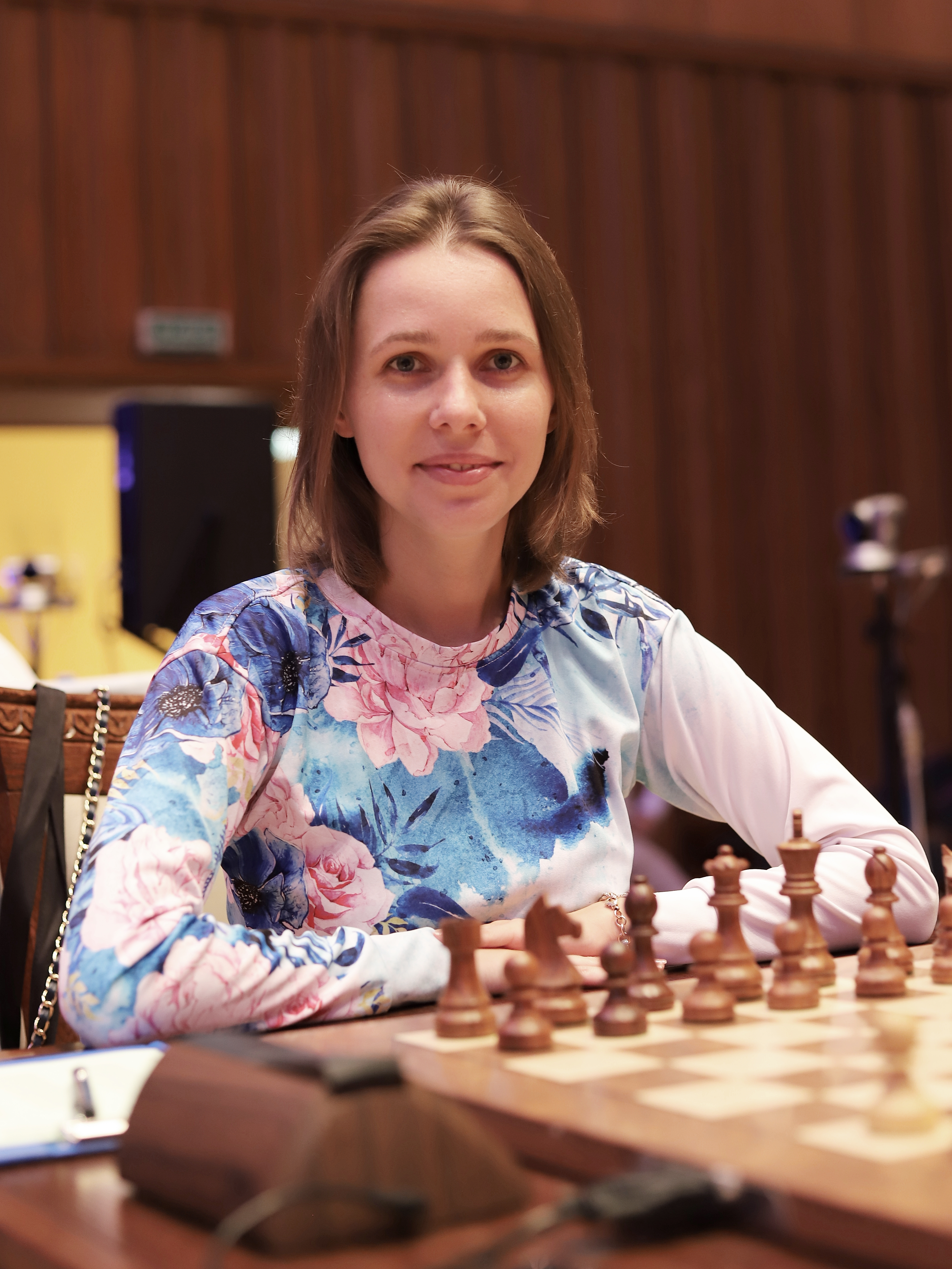
Former Women's World Champion and world no. 5 Mariya Muzychuk played on board one for Ukraine

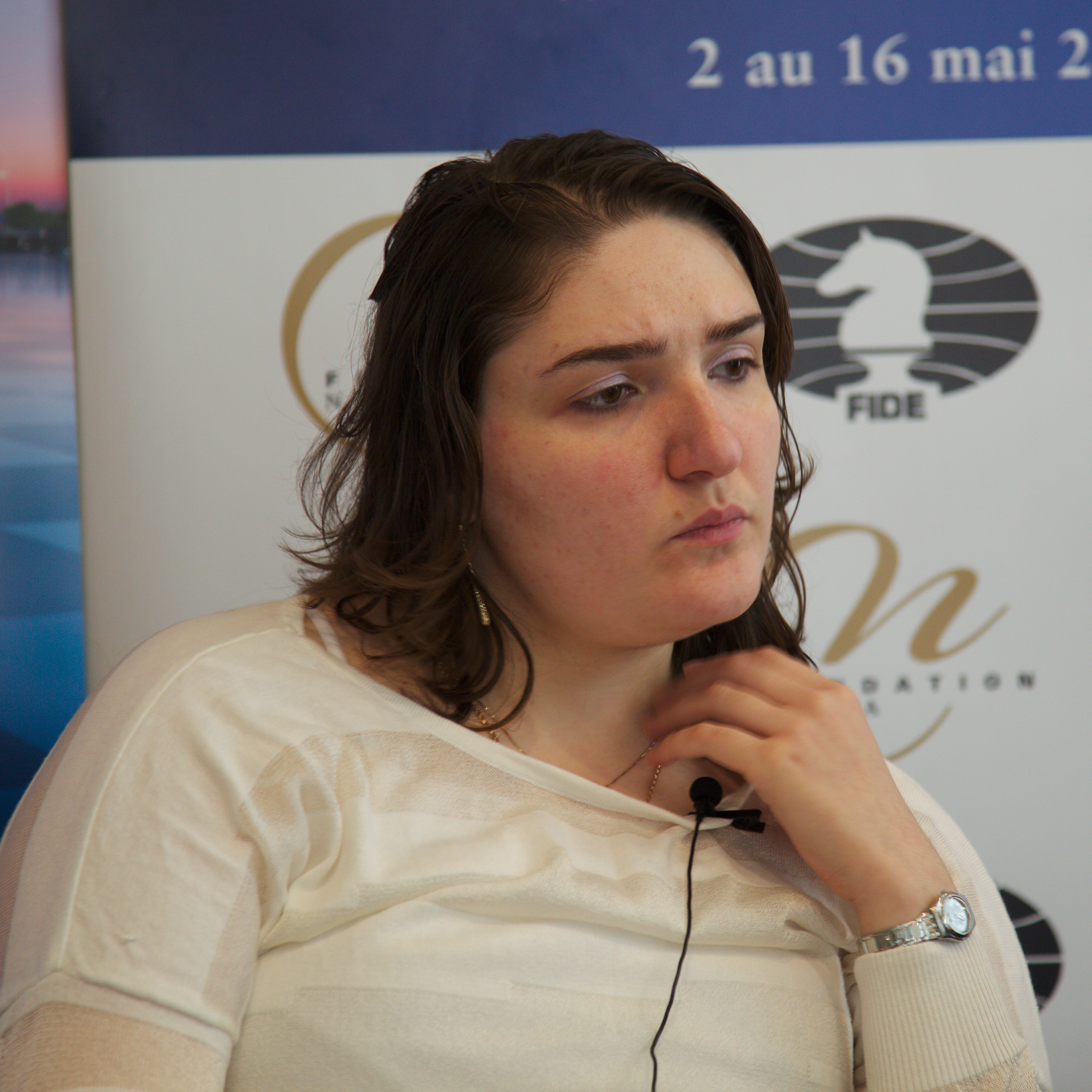
World no. 7 Nana Dzagnidze played on board one for Georgia

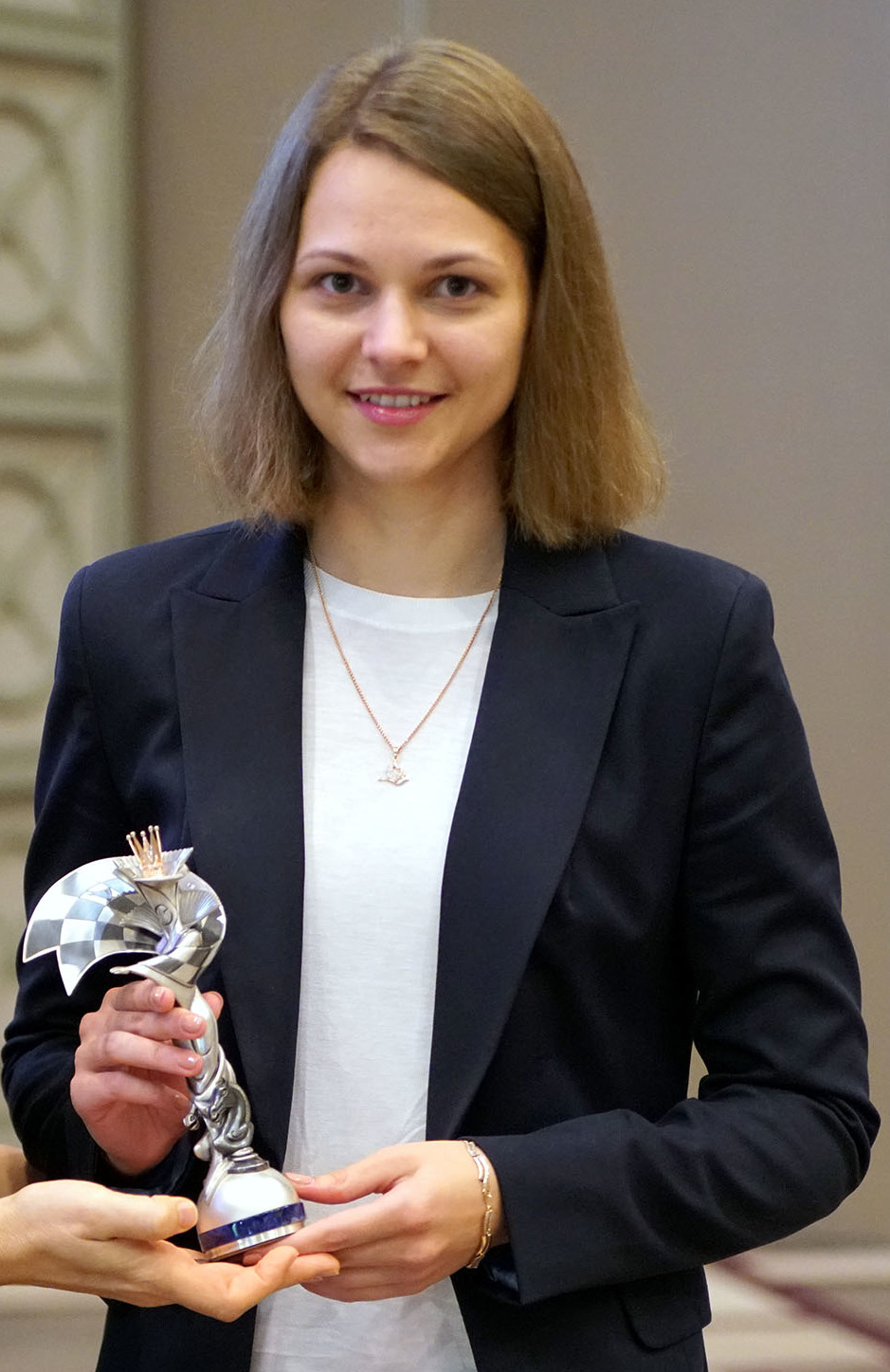
World no. 8 Anna Muzychuk played on board two for Ukraine

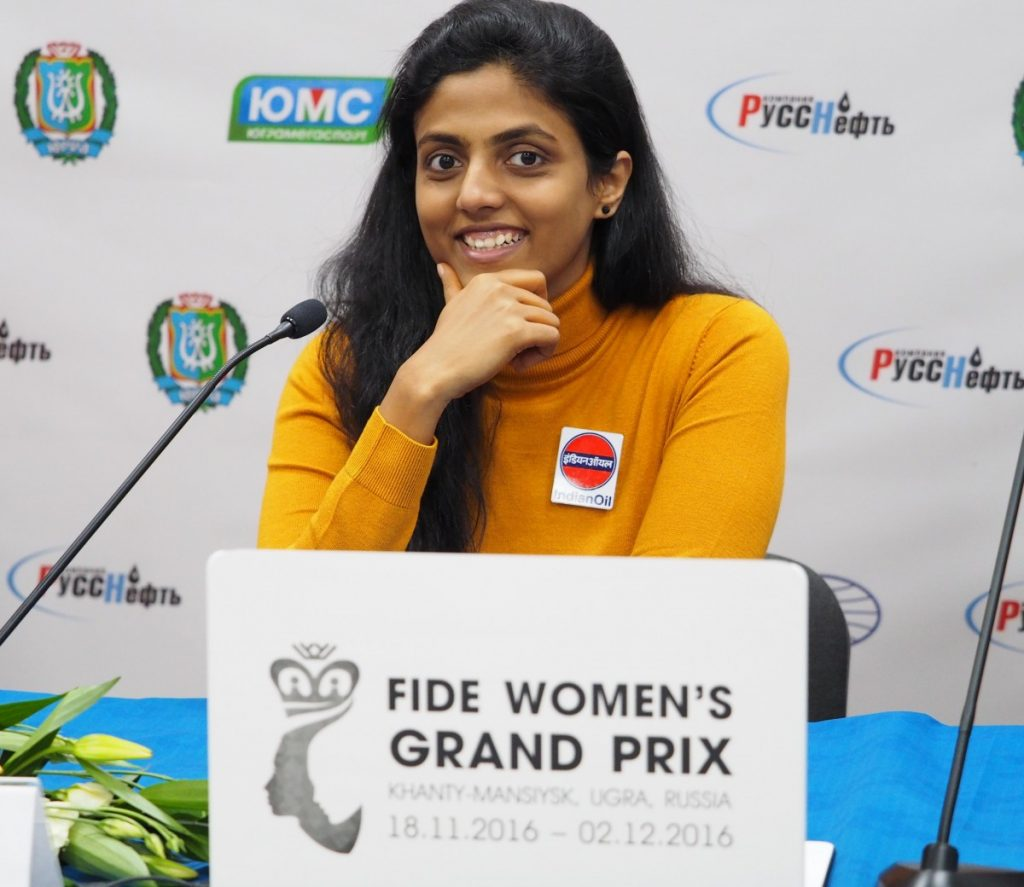
World no. 11 Harika Dronavalli played on board two for India

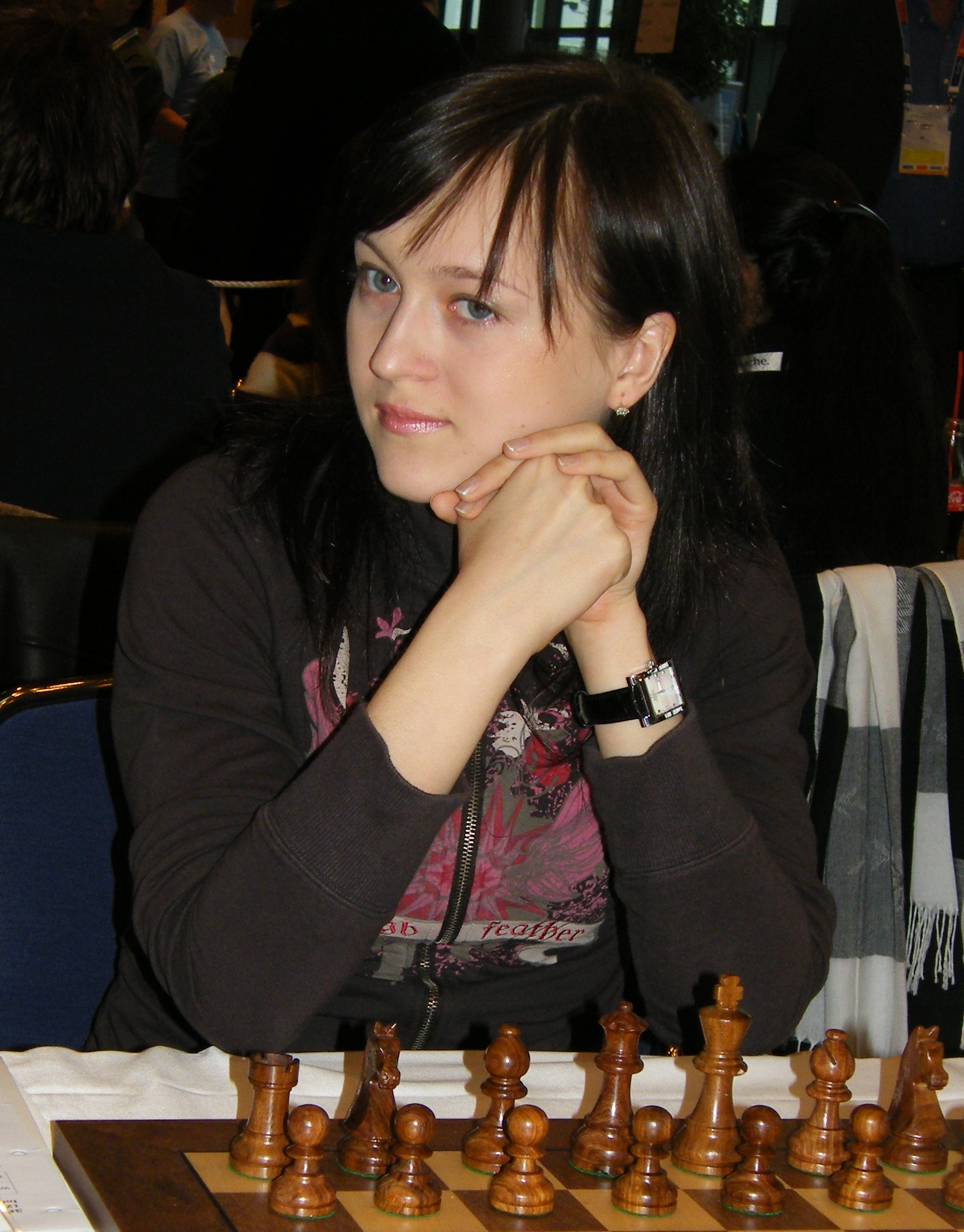
Former Women's World Champion Anna Ushenina played on board three for Ukraine

== Rounds ==
=== Round 1 ===
The first round in the women's event started with former World Champion Viswanathan Anand making the opening move in Anna Muzychuk's game on board one of the match between Ukraine and South Africa. There were no surprising results in the opening match day and a total of 70 out of 79 matches resulted in maximum victories. The top-ranked team of the host nation India managed to score a maximum victory against Tajikistan after Tania Sachdev as Black on the third board needed 103 moves to squeeze out a win in an endgame with a pair of Bishops and fixed pawn structure on the King's side. In the same match, Koneru Humpy on board one played one of the best games of the day with a tactical vision that eight-time Russian Chess Champion Peter Svidler described as "incredibly good". Of the other pre-tournament favourites, Ukraine, Georgia, Poland, France, Azerbaijan, United States, Germany, Armenia and Kazakhstan all swept their opponents.

=== Round 2 ===
Peñafiel vs. Vidic

Position: g8 black king, g7 black pawn, a6 black queen, c6 white knight, d5 white pawn, c4 white queen, f4 white rook, h4 black bishop, c3 black pawn, e3 white pawn, g3 black rook, e2 white king

This is the position in which Black should have exchanged Queens. The game continued with 56... Rg2+? followed by 57.Kd3 Qxc4+ 58.Rxc4 with a winning endgame for White.

The favourites generally managed to score their second match victories even though there were some unexpected results on the individual boards. A total of 40 teams scored their second match wins and 11 teams, including France, Azeribaijan and Armenia, snatched their second 4–0 victories. On the first table, India beat Argentina 3½–½ thanks to the wins achieved by Vaishali Rameshbabu, Tania Sachdev and Bhakti Kulkarni on the boards from two to four, whereas Koneru Humpy was held to a draw with the White pieces by Marisa Zuriel on the top board. Ukraine defeated Turkey 3–1 on the second table with victories scored by Anna Ushenina, Nataliya Buksa and Iulija Osmak, while Mariya Muzychuk lost her game to Ekaterina Atalik on the top board. Georgian players had a hard battle against Lithuania but finally pulled off a minimal victory. Meri Arabidze lost her game with the Black pieces against Gabija Šimkūnaitė on the lowest board, while Lela Javakhishvili settled for a draw against Kamile Baginskaite. However, the Georgian team scored wins in the games with the White pieces played by Nana Dzagnidze and Salome Melia on the first and the third boards, respectively.

The biggest upset of the day perhaps happened in the match between Ecuador and Slovenia where the South American team narrowly defeated their opponents as a result of the wins scored on the second and third boards. On board three, Teja Vidic could have kept the game balanced against Josselyne Peñafiel had she exchanged queens at the right time, but she misplaced her Rook and allowed her opponent to get a winning endgame (see diagram). Pia Cramling needed only nine moves to beat Knarik Mouradian after her opponent blundered a piece early in the game; Sweden completed a 4–0 sweep of Lebanon.

A memorable moment of the day was the first win by the youngest participant in the Olympiad, eight-year-old Randa Seder of Palestine, who won her game against unrated Mohamed Fahima Ali Mohamed of Comoros.

=== Round 3 ===
Arabidze vs. Koubova

Position: a7 white rook, g7 black pawn, f6 black king, c5 black pawn, f5 black rook, h5 black pawn, h4 white pawn, g2 white pawn, g1 white king

This is the point of the game when Black played 46... g5? in a winning position, allowing White to develop counterplay along the h-file after 47.g4! hxg4 48.h5!, which was enough for a draw.

The top six seeds have all won their matches in the third round. India defeated England with a 3–1 scoreline thanks to the victories scored by R. Vaishali and Bhakti Kulkarni with the White pieces. Ukraine swept Slovakia wherein Mariya Muzychuk recovered from her second-round loss and beat Zuzana Borošová on the top board. On the third table, Georgia had a tough match against the Czech Republic, with Nino Batsiashvili scoring the only win over Joanna Worek to snatch a 2½–1½ victory for her team. Things could have gone worse for Georgia had Anna Koubova not misplayed the rook endgame against Meri Arabidze (see diagram). Poland and France scored 3–1 victories against Vietnam and Italy with the wins scored on the boards where their players had the White pieces.

Mongolia achieved a 3–1 victory over the favoured team of the United States, which was considered to be one of the main surprises of the day. The key victories for the Mongolian team have come on the lower boards where Turmunkh Munkhzul and Bat-Erdene Mungunzul won over Carissa Yip and Tatev Abrahamyan, respectively. Estonia produced another surprise in this round by edging out Armenia 2½–1½. Mai Narva on the top board defeated Elina Danielian, while all other games on the lower boards were drawn.

=== Round 4 ===
Milliet vs. Erić

Position: b8 black rook, d8 black rook, g8 black king, b7 black bishop, e7 black queen, f7 black pawn, g7 white pawn, h7 black pawn, a6 black pawn, h6 white pawn, d5 black knight, g5 white pawn, e4 white rook, h4 white queen, b3 white knight, e3 black pawn, h3 white bishop, b2 white pawn, c2 white pawn, c1 white king, d1 white rook

In this position, Erić had the opportunity to play the crushing 35... Nc3!! and win on the spot. However, she opted for 35... Qc7? and went on to lose the game.

A total of eight teams—India, Ukraine, Georgia, Poland, France, Azerbaijan, India-2 and Romania—scored their fourth match victories in this round. On the top table, India edged out Hungary 2½–1½ with only one decisive game on the fourth table where Tania Sachdev fought a hard battle to win the game. The leading team after three rounds Bulgaria, which dropped only a half point in the previous rounds, was not able to stop Ukraine. Anna Muzychuk and Anna Ushenina secured a minimal victory for their team after scoring the decisive win over Gergana Peycheva and Beloslava Krasteva on boards two and three, respectively. Ushenina managed to grind out a victory from a drawn rook endgame after her opponent made mishandled the position. Georgia cruised to the fourth consecutive after beating India-3 by 3–1. P. V. Nandhidhaa's win against Nino Batsiashvili was all that the third team of the host nation could do, whereas Eesha Karavade lost to Nana Dzagnidze, Sahithi Varshini to Lela Javakhishvili and Bodda Pratyusha to Salome Melia on the other boards.

Romania, led by Irina Bulmaga, surprised the eight-seeded German team thanks to the wins scored by Mihaela Sandu and Alessia-Mihaela Ciolacu on the second and third boards, respectively. Ciolacu outplayed Hanna Marie Klek in an endgame with two rooks and a knight versus two rooks and a bishop. A dramatic match was played between France and Serbia, which ended up with a narrow 2½–1½ win in favour of the French team. However, things could have gone in the opposite direction had Jovana Erić not missed a decisive blow in the game she lost to Sophie Milliet (see diagram). Mongolia remained undefeated after securing a 2–2 tie against Kazakhstan wherein the teams exchanged one win each on the second and fourth boards. Poland did not have any problems and dismantled the Netherlands by 3½–½, while the second Indian team was also victorious in this round after edging out Estonia with the only win scored by Vantika Agrawal.

=== Round 5 ===
Sandu vs. Soćko

Position: d8 black queen, f8 black rook, g8 black king, b7 black pawn, d7 black rook, f7 black pawn, g7 black pawn, h7 black bishop, a6 black pawn, d6 black knight, f6 white bishop, h6 black pawn, c5 black pawn, d5 white knight, g4 white pawn, f3 white queen, a2 white pawn, b2 white pawn, e2 white rook, f2 white pawn, h2 white pawn, e1 white rook, g1 white king

This is the position after White played 28. Bf6!, sacrificing a bishop that Black should have taken. Soćko played 28... Qa5??, inviting 29. Bxg7! Kxg7 30. Qf6+ with a mating attack.

The only teams with five match victories after the fifth round are India, Georgia and Romania. India kept the perfect score by beating France 2½–1½ thanks to Tania Sachdev, who defeated Andreea Navrotescu on the fourth board and proved to be the crucial player on the team as in the previous round. The winning margin for the host team could have been larger had R Vaishali converted a clear advantage but misplayed the position and eventually settled for a draw. Georgia dominated the second Indian team by 3–1 with two wins on the lower boards where Lela Javakhishvili outplayed Soumya Swaminathan and Meri Arabidze defeated Divya Deshmukh. On the other boards, Vantika Agarwal fought hard to save the game against Nana Dzagnidze, while Padmini Rout made a draw with Nino Batsiashvili.

Romania narrowly beat Poland in an entertaining match with three decisive games on the boards from two to four where the players with the White pieces scored wins; Mihaela Sandu and Elena-Luminița Cosma won for the Romanian team, while Oliwia Kiołbasa scored a full point for Poland. On the first board, Irina Bulmaga managed to draw her game against Alina Kashlinskaya in an endgame with a knight and a pawn versus four dangerously advancing pawns. Mihaela Sandu tricked higher-rated Monika Soćko in an attacking game by offering a sacrifice that her opponent erroneously did not accept (see diagram).

Ukraine and Azerbaijan tied an exciting match in which Mariya Muzychuk won her game against Gunay Mammadzada on the top board to put hear team ahead, but Ulviyya Fataliyeva levelled the score after beating Nataliya Buksa on the fourth board. In the other matches, Kazakhstan and Germany defeated Cuba and Mongolia by a 3–1 scoreline each, respectively; and Peru surprisingly edged past the United States 2½–1½ thanks to the victories by The Ann Chumpitaz over Irina Krush on board two and Paula Paredes Bustamante outplayed Carissa Yip on the third board.

=== Round 6 ===
Vaishali vs. Javakhishvili

Position: a8 black rook, d8 black queen, g8 black king, a7 black pawn, d7 black pawn, f7 black pawn, g7 black pawn, h7 black pawn, a6 black bishop, b6 black pawn, c6 black pawn, d6 black knight, f6 black bishop, d5 white pawn, a4 white pawn, c4 white pawn, f4 white bishop, a3 white knight, b2 white pawn, f2 white pawn, g2 white pawn, h2 white pawn, a1 white rook, e1 white queen, f1 white bishop, g1 white king

In this position, Javakhishvili blundered with 16... Nb7? and enabled Vaishali to play 17. b4!!. The game continued with 17... Bxa1 18. Qxa1 Qe7 19. b5 Nc5 20. bxa6 Nxa6 21. Be3 and White won after 36 moves.

The central match of the sixth round was the clash between India and Georgia, both with perfect scores after five rounds. India scored a clear 3–1 victory over Georgia thanks to the wins by Koneru Humpy and R Vaishali over Nana Dzagnidze and Lela Javakhishvili, respectively. Kumpy was surprised with the Benoni Defense in the opening but managed to win the game. Vaishali got a slight long-term advantage in a middlegame with symmetrical set-up that arose from the Berlin Defence. However, Javakhishvili blundered and allowed her to get a winning position with two pieces for a rook after sacrificing the exchange to gain space advantage (see diagram). On the other boards, Harika Dronavalli played an easy draw with Nino Batsiashvili, while Tania Sachdev and Salome Melia played another game that ended peacefully.

Romania and Ukraine tied with one win per side and draws on the first and third boards. Irina Bulmaga played an attacking game against former World Women's Champion Mariya Muzychuk in which sacrificed the exchange to break through the centre on move 27 and got some winning chances in the endgame, but her opponent demonstrated her defensive skills to save the game. Anna Muzychuk defeated Mihaela Sandu as White on the second board, but Iulija Osmak fell into a tactical trap against Miruna-Daria Lehaci in an equal endgame and eventually lost the game. Azerbaijan convincingly beat Kazakhstan 3–1 with wins on the lowest two boards. On the third board, Gulnar Mammadova snatched a win against Xeniya Balabayeva in a complex French Defence after Black had a clearly better position in the middlegame, while Ulviyya Fataliyeva defeated Guliskhan Nakhbayeva on the last board.

In the other matches, the Netherlands defeated France 3–1 in a match with four decisive games, while Israel beat Germany with the same scoreline. The Dutch team fielded two teenagers, with 16-year-old Eline Roebers beating Marie Sebag and 15-year-old Machteld van Foreest losing to Pauline Guichard, but the match victory was secured by Rosa Ratsma and Tea Lanchava on the lower boards. Israel's win over Germany has come as a result of the victories on the second and third boards scored by Dina Belenkaya and Michal Lahav.

=== Round 7 ===
Beydullayeva vs. Vaishali

Position: f8 white rook, f6 black pawn, g6 black pawn, h5 black pawn, e4 black pawn, g4 black king, h4 white pawn, f3 black rook, g3 white pawn, e2 white king, f2 white pawn

This is the position in which Beydullayeva blundered with 64. Re8??. Vaishali continued with 64...f5 65.Rg8 Kh3 and White ended up in a desperate position because Black managed to safely invade with the king.

India continued to dominate the tournament and scored their seventh consecutive victory by minimally beating Azerbaijan 2½–1½ despite suffering the first individual loss. Koneru Humpy had a big advantage in the game against Gunay Mammadzada on the top board but went on to lose the game. On the second board, Harika Dronavali missed a chance in the rook endgame and eventually drew the game. Tania Sachdev and Ulviyya Fataliyeva played a game in the Queen's Gambit Declined. The Indian made a breakthrough in the centre on the account of the misplaced opponent's knight on the kingside before exchanging most pieces to get a superior endgame that she converted after 63 moves. The second win for India was achieved by R Vaishali, who played actively in a drawish rook endgame and pressured her opponent to blunder and lose the game (see diagram).

Georgia bounced back after the loss in the previous round to beat Romania thanks to the win scored by Lela Javakhishvili, while Ukraine crushed the Netherlands 3½–½. Poland and Bulgaria split the points with one game won per side in which Nurgyul Salimova inflicted the first loss on Alina Kashlinskaya and Oliwia Kiołbasa scored her seventh victory in seven games. The second Indian team was upset by Greece 2½–1½ wherein Divya Deshmukh scored a win, but Vantika Agrawal and Soumya Swaminathan lost for the team of the host nation, whereas the third Indian team clearly defeated Switzerland 3–1.

=== Round 8 ===
Mkrtchian vs. Batsiashvili

Position: e8 black rook, f8 black king, f7 black pawn, a6 black pawn, d6 black pawn, f6 black queen, g6 black pawn, b5 black pawn, c5 black knight, d5 white pawn, f5 white pawn, h5 black rook, d4 white knight, e4 white pawn, d3 black pawn, e3 white queen, g3 white rook, h3 white pawn, a2 white pawn, b2 white pawn, g2 white rook, h2 white king

Mkrtchian blundered with 45. Rg4?? in this position, which enabled Batsiashvili to play 45... Rxe4. The game continued with 46. Rxe4 Nxe4 47. Qxd3 Qe5+ 48. Kg1 Ng5 with a winning position for Black.

The eighth round featured the clash between the two top seeds at the tournament—India and Ukraine—which ended in a tie with four draws. Mariya Muzychuk in her game against Koneru Humpy opted for the Nimzo-Indian Defence, which was followed by massive exchanges that left a drawish endgame with a rook and four pawns on each side and the game was drawn on move 40. Anna Muzychuk played the old-fashioned Greco Gambit in the Italian Game against Harika Dronavalli on the second board, but the Indian completed the development and get out of the opponent's initiative to force a draw in an opposite-coloured bishops endgame after 49 moves. Vaishali R faced the Petrov's Defence in her game with Anna Ushenina and ended up in a slightly worse position but demonstrated good calculating abilities and understanding of the ensuing rook endgame to hold the game. Tania Sachdev and Nataliya Buksa opened with the Ruy Lopez, which was drawn by repetition after massive exchanges on the queenside. As a result, India retained the tournament lead with 15 match points, whereas Ukraine remained two points behind with 13.

Georgia outplayed Armenia 3½–½ to move within a point of the leading Indian team. Nino Batsiashvili defeated Lilit Mkrtchian as Black after the Armenian played cautiously in a complex tactical position (see diagram). Lela Javakhishvili also scored a creative victory over Anna M. Sargsyan. Poland, Bulgaria, Kazakhstan and Mongolia are other teams which have scored 13 match points along with Ukraine. Poland defeated India-3 by a 3–1 scoreline with the eighth consecutive win by Oliwia Kiołbasa. Mongolia edged out Hungary 2½–1½ thanks to the wins by Törmönkhiin Mönkhzul and Bat-Erdene Mungunzul.

=== Round 9 ===
Kiołbasa vs. Vaishali

Position: a8 white rook, a7 white pawn, f7 black king, g7 black pawn, f6 black pawn, g5 black pawn, h4 white pawn, g3 white pawn, a2 black rook, f2 white pawn, e1 white king

This is the position after Kiołbasa played 57. h4. Vaishali went for 57... Kg6, allowing 58. h5+ Kf7 59.f4 gxf4 60. gxf4 f5 and White managed to successfully transfer the king to g5 in order to win the game.

The first team of the host nation and sole leader India was upset by Poland by 2½–1½ with the only decisive game played on the third board where Oliwia Kiołbasa beat Vaishali R in a drawish endgame to extend the perfect score at the tournament to nine wins. After a strategic battle, the players entered a rook endgame right after the time control in which the Polish had an extra pawn on the queenside in a game which seemed to end in a draw. However, the Indian misplayed the position by allowing her opponent to transfer the king and win (see diagram). Koneru Humpy was well-prepared in the Queen's Gambit Declined against Alina Kashlinskaya and drew in a rook endgame just before the first time control. Harika Dronavalli and Monika Socko fought in a Queen's Indian Defence in which the Indian gained initiative from the beginning and arranged her pieces in an attacking formation but failed to find a win.

On the second table, second seeds Ukraine and third seeds Georgia played a 2–2 draw. Nino Batsiashvili defeated Anna Muzychuk in a tactical encounter on the second board, whereas Nataliya Buksa levelled the score by beating Meri Arabidze with a kingside attack. Former World Women's Champion Mariya Muzychuk missed an opportunity to gain significant advantage against Nana Dzagnidze. Kazakhstan beat Bulgaria 3–1 with Zhansaya Abdumalik inflicting the first loss on Nurgyul Salimova to join Poland, India and Georgia in the lead after this round.

=== Round 10 ===
Soćko vs. Batsiashvili

Position: b7 white rook, a6 black pawn, b6 white knight, b4 black bishop, c4 black pawn, d4 black king, b3 black knight, g3 white king

In this position, Soćko blundered with 68. Na4?? (the correct continuation to hold was 68. Rd7+ Kc5 69. Nd5 Bd2 70. Kf3 a5 71. Ke4 a4 72. Rc7+ Lb5 73. Rb7+). Batsiashvili won the game after 84 moves.

In the penultimate round, India outplayed Kazakhstan with a big 3½–½ victory to retake the lead. Koneru Humpy, Tania Sachdev and Bhakti Kulkarni were victorious for the host team, whereas R Vaishali conceded a draw. Humpy Koneru and Zhansaya Abdumalik played in the Meran Variation of the Queen's Gambit Declined where the Indian got an early edge and won after 55 moves. Xeniya Balabayeva employed the Semi-Slav Defence against Tania Sachdev and had a balanced position until she cracked under pressure and went down in 31 moves. Bhakti Kulkarni played the King's Indian Defence against Guliskhan Nakhbayeva and launched a powerful attack on the kingside that brought her the win after 47 moves. Vaishali opted for the Grünfeld Defence against Bibisara Assaubayeva in which she traded two rooks for the opponent's queen and got to a slightly better position but the game was drawn after the move 50.

On the second table, Poland and Georgia settled for a tie. The Polish team took the lead with Maria Malicka's win over Salome Melia, but Georgia equalised the score to 2–2 thanks to a blunder committed by Monika Soćko (see diagram). Oliwia Kiołbasa, who had a perfect score of 9 out of 9 before this round, conceded the first half point to Lela Javakhishvili. In the other matches on the top tables, Ukraine edged past Germany 2½–1½, Azerbaijan swept Armenia 4–0 and India-2 beat the Netherlands 3–1.

=== Round 11 ===
India approached their final match against the United States as the sole leaders. However, they lost by 3–1 and ended the tournament with the bronze medal. On the other tables, Ukraine scored a clear 3–1 victory over Poland, and Georgia beat Azerbaijan by the same result. At the end, Ukraine won the gold medal, while Georgia took the silver.

== Final standings ==
Ukraine won the gold medal with 18 match points from seven wins and four draws, making them the only unbeaten team. It was their second title, having previously won in 2006. Silver medallists Georgia also finished with 18 match points but had a worse tie-breaker. The bronze medal went to the first India team, who were leading the tournament by two points after seven rounds, before losing to Poland in the ninth round and the United States in the eleventh round, finishing on 17 match points. The United States and Kazakhstan had the same score as India but due to weaker tie-breakers finished in fourth and fifth place, respectively.

Oliwia Kiołbasa of Poland had the highest individual score in the Women's event, with 9½ out of a possible 11 points (nine wins, one draw and one loss) with a performance rating of 2565. Individual gold medals were also won by Pia Cramling of Sweden with 9½ out of 11 and a rating performance of 2532, Nino Batsiashvili of Georgia with 7½ out of 10 and a rating performance of 2504, Bat-Erdene Mungunzul of Mongolia who scored 7½ out of 10 with a rating performance of 2460, and Jana Schneider of Germany who began as a reserve player before scoring 9 out of 10 points with a rating performance of 2414.

Women's event
#	Country	Players	Average rating	MP	dSB
1st place, gold medalist(s)	Ukraine	M. Muzychuk, A. Muzychuk, Ushenina, Buksa, Osmak	2478	18	413.5
2nd place, silver medalist(s)	Georgia	Dzagnidze, Batsiashvili, Javakhishvili, Melia, Arabidze	2475	18	392.0
3rd place, bronze medalist(s)	India	Humpy, Harika, Vaishali, Sachdev, Kulkarni	2486	17	396.5
4	United States	Tokhirjonova, Krush, Yip, Zatonskih, Abrahamyan	2390	17	390.0
5	Kazakhstan	Abdumalik, Assaubayeva, Balabayeva, Nakhbayeva, Nurgali	2365	17	352.0
6	Poland	Kashlinskaya, Soćko, Kiołbasa, Malicka, Rudzińska	2423	16	396.0
7	Azerbaijan	Mammadzada, Mammadova, Beydullayeva, Balajayeva, Fataliyeva	2399	16	389.0
8	India-2	Agrawal, Rout, Soumya, Gomes, Deshmukh	2351	16	369.5
9	Bulgaria	Salimova, Peycheva, Krasteva, Antova, Radeva	2319	16	361.0
10	Germany	Pähtz, Heinemann, Klek, Wagner, Schneider	2383	16	344.5

Notes

- Average ratings calculated by chess-results.com based in July 2022 ratings.

All board prizes were given out according to performance ratings for players who have played at least eight games at the tournament. Oliwia Kiołbasa on the third board had the best performance of all players in the tournament. The winners of the gold medal on each board are listed in turn:

- Board 1: (Sweden) Pia Cramling 2532
- Board 2: (Georgia (country)) Nino Batsiashvili 2504
- Board 3: (Poland) Oliwia Kiołbasa 2565
- Board 4: (Mongolia) Bat Erdene Mungunzul 2460
- Reserve: (Germany) Jana Schneider 2414

== See also ==
- Open event at the 44th Chess Olympiad
