= 44th Chess Olympiad =

2022 chess tournament in Chennai, India

- Logo of the 44th Chess Olympiad
- Host city: Mamallapuram, Chennai
- Country: India
- Nations: 186 (Open); 160 (Women)
- Teams: 188 (Open); 162 (Women)
- Athletes: 1,737 (937 in Open and 800 in Women's event)
- Dates: 28 July – 9 August 2022
- Opened by: Narendra Modi
- Torch lighter: Gukesh Dommaraju and R Praggnanandhaa
- Main venue: Four Points by Sheraton

Medalists

Team (Open)
- 1st place, gold medalist(s): Uzbekistan
- 2nd place, silver medalist(s): Armenia
- 3rd place, bronze medalist(s): India

Team (Women)
- 1st place, gold medalist(s): Ukraine
- 2nd place, silver medalist(s): Georgia
- 3rd place, bronze medalist(s): India

Individual (Open)
- Board 1: (India) Gukesh Dommaraju
- Board 2: (India) Nihal Sarin
- Board 3: (England) David Howell
- Board 4: (Uzbekistan) Jahongir Vakhidov
- Reserve: (Poland) Mateusz Bartel

Individual (Women)
- Board 1: (Sweden) Pia Cramling
- Board 2: (Georgia (country)) Nino Batsiashvili
- Board 3: (Poland) Oliwia Kiołbasa
- Board 4: (Mongolia) Bat-Erdene Mungunzul
- Reserve: (Germany) Jana Schneider

Gaprindashvili Trophy
- India

The 44th Chess Olympiad (Tamil: 44-ஆவது சதுரங்க ஒலிம்பியாடு) was an international team chess event organised by the International Chess Federation (FIDE) in Chennai, India, from 28 July to 9 August 2022. It consisted of two main tournaments—an Open event, enabling participation of players from all genders, and a Women's event, enabling participation of female players only—as well as several events to promote chess. The Olympiad was initially supposed to take place in August 2020 in Khanty-Mansiysk, Russia, the host of the Chess World Cup 2019, but it was later moved to Moscow. However, it was postponed due to the COVID-19 pandemic and then relocated to Chennai following Russia's invasion of Ukraine. This was the first Chess Olympiad to take place in India.

The total number of participants was 1,737, consisting of 937 in the Open and 800 in the Women's event. The number of registered teams was 188 from 186 nations in the Open section and 162 from 160 nations in the Women's section; being the host nation, India had three teams participating in each section. Both sections set team participation records. The main venue of the Chess Olympiad was the convention centre at the Four Points by Sheraton, while the opening and closing ceremonies were held at the Jawaharlal Nehru Stadium. The Chief Arbiter of the event was France's Laurent Freyd.

A total of 11 rounds were played in both the Open and Women's events, and each featured four players from one team facing four players from another team. Uzbekistan won the gold medal in the Open event, which was their second medal at the Chess Olympiad after previously winning a silver medal in 1992, while Ukraine claimed their second gold in the Women's event after having previously won the 2006. English player David Howell had the highest performance for an individual player in the Open event with a performance rating of 2898 (he scored 7½ out of a possible 8 points). Polish player Oliwia Kiołbasa had the highest individual performance in the Women's event with a performance rating of 2565 (she scored 9½ of a possible 11 points).

The 93rd FIDE Congress also took place during the Olympiad, at which Arkady Dvorkovich was re-elected as FIDE President and former World Champion Viswanathan Anand was elected as FIDE Deputy President.

== Background ==
The Chess Olympiad is a biennial chess tournament in which teams representing nations compete in an Olympic-style event. The first unofficial edition, labelled as the "Chess Olympic Games", was held in Paris in 1924 and coincided with the Summer Olympic Games that took place in the city in the same year. Despite the fact that the event was not officially part of the Olympic Games and the winners were not awarded official Olympic medals, the rules of the Olympic Games applied. The organisers of the Summer Olympics defined chess as a sport, (Note: Chess was officially recognised as a sport by the International Olympic Committee in 1999. At the 2000 Summer Olympics, a two-game exhibition match between grandmasters Viswanathan Anand and Alexey Shirov took place, but no Olympic medals were awarded.) but demanded that only amateurs be allowed to participate, which posed a problem because it was difficult to draw a line between amateurs and professionals. The first official edition of the Chess Olympiad was held in London in 1927. Up until 1950, the tournament was organised at irregular intervals. Since then, it has been held once every two years. The first Women's Chess Olympiad took place in Emmen, Netherlands in 1957; since 1976, the Women's tournament has been held simultaneously with an Open tournament (Note: The Open tournament enables participation of players from all genders.) at the Chess Olympiads. The former Soviet Union has historically been the most successful nation, holding 18 gold medals.

The 44th Chess Olympiad was supposed to take place in 2020. Bidding opened in December 2015 for the Olympiad and the simultaneous FIDE Congress; bids could be made in connection with those for the Chess World Cup 2019. Each city bid had to be submitted to the Fédération Internationale des Échecs (FIDE) by 31 March 2016, including details of the organising committee, finances, provision of amenities, and stipends. The city of Khanty-Mansiysk (Russia) submitted the only original bid for the event, although the national federations of Argentina and Slovakia had previously also expressed interest. The bid from Khanty-Mansiysk was approved at the 87th FIDE Congress in September 2016.

In November 2019, during the opening ceremony of the FIDE Grand Prix in Hamburg, FIDE President Arkady Dvorkovich announced that the Chess Olympiad would be relocated from Khanty-Mansiysk to Moscow. The president of the Russian Chess Federation, Andrey Filatov, explained that the decision was driven by technical problems because of the enlarged number of participants due to the inaugural Chess Olympiad for People with Disabilities, as well as the growing demands from amateur chess players who wanted to attend the event following the 2018 FIFA World Cup. Ultimately, it was decided that Khanty-Mansiysk would host the Chess Olympiad for People with Disabilities from 29 July – 4 August 2020, whereas Moscow would host the tournaments of the Chess Olympiad from 5–17 August 2020.

In February 2022, following the Russian invasion of Ukraine, FIDE decided to move the Chess Olympiad, FIDE Congress and Chess Olympiad for People with Disabilities away from Russia. Shortly after this announcement, the All India Chess Federation (AICF) expressed interest in hosting the events, in either Delhi, Gujarat or Tamil Nadu. The Government of Tamil Nadu agreed to host the Chess Olympiad and provided around ₹75 crore (US$7.8 million). On 15 March 2022, FIDE announced that Chennai, the capital of Tamil Nadu, would be the new host of the event. It meant that the Chess Olympiad would be hosted in India for the first time.

== Preparations ==
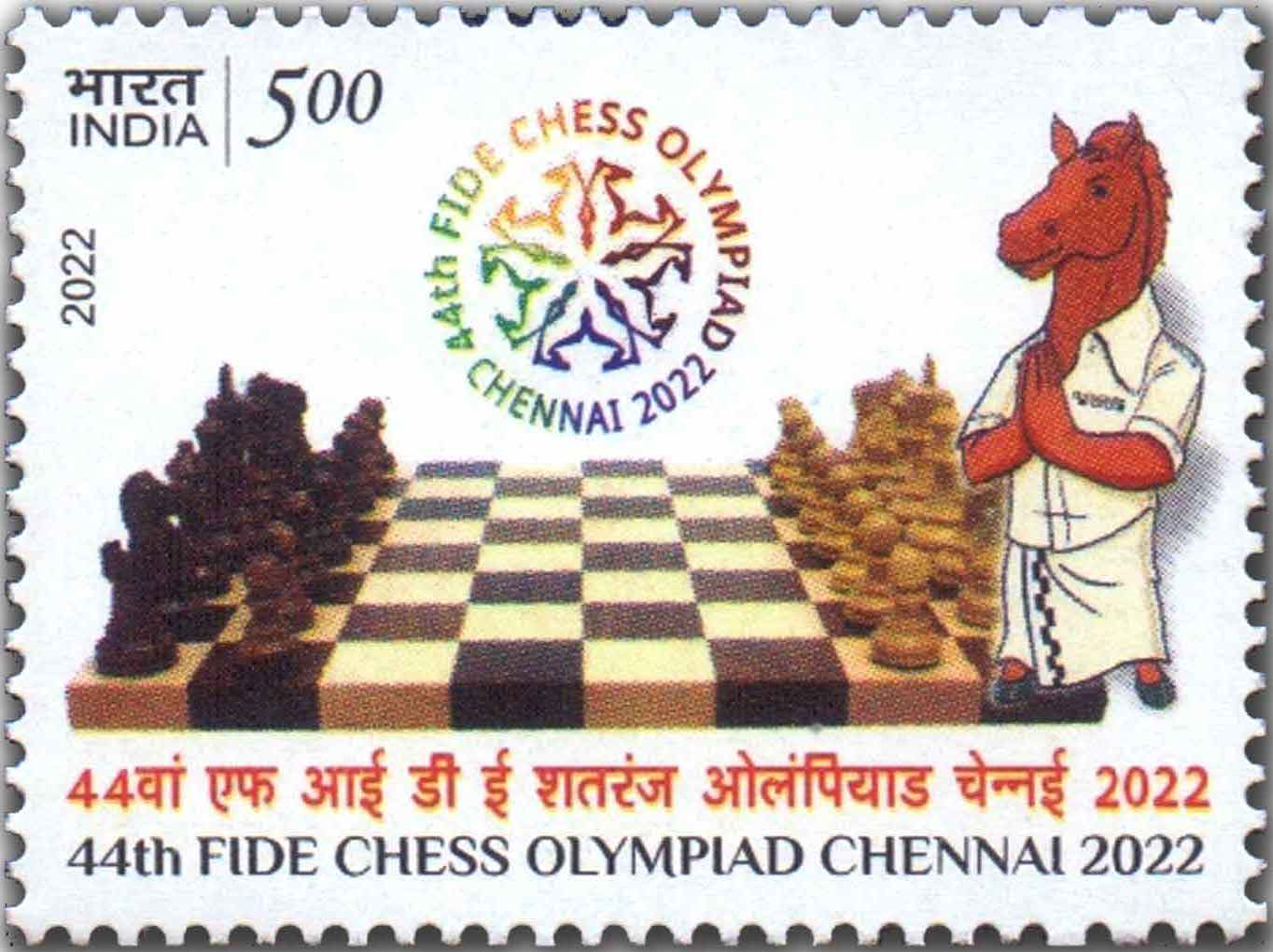
Indian postal stamp dedicated to the 44th Chess Olympiad

The total budget for the Olympiad was ₹92 crore (US$9.6 million). The event was hosted and managed in India by the AICF. Sanjay Kapoor, who later became president of AICF, was the president of the organising committee for the 44th Chess Olympiad, and AICF's secretary, Bharat Singh Chauhan, was the tournament director. The coordinating committee was headed by the Chief Minister of Tamil Nadu M. K. Stalin and included A. Raja (MP from Nilgiris), Udhayanidhi Stalin (MLA from Chepauk-Thiruvallikeni) three representatives of the AICF, the president of the Tamil Nadu State Chess Association and other representatives of the local authorities. France's International Arbiter Laurent Freyd was named Chief Arbiter of the Olympiad.

=== Venue and transport ===
The venue was the convention centre at the Four Points by Sheraton in Mahabalipuram near Chennai. This consisted of an existing banquet hall (Hall 1) and a newly constructed hall (Hall 2), which cost ₹5 crore (US$520,000). Hall 1 had a usable area of 22,500 square feet (2,090 m^{2}), while Hall 2 was double the size at 45,000 square feet (4,200 m^{2}). Hall 1 hosted games played between the best-ranking teams in the standings on the top 28 boards in the Open section and the top board in the Women's section, while the rest of the boards were played in Hall 2. Exhibition space was also provided. The opening and closing ceremonies were held at the Nehru Indoor Stadium, part of the Jawaharlal Nehru Stadium complex. This was built in 1995 at a cost of ₹20 crore (equivalent to ₹130 crore or US$14 million in 2026) and has a capacity of 8,000 spectators.

Around 125 buses, 100 SUVs and six luxury cars were used to transport players and dignitaries during the event. The road between Chennai International Airport and Mahabalipuram was widened and reconstructed to improve traffic flow, and one lane of the highway was reserved for Olympiad traffic during the event.

=== Security and biosecurity ===
The Tamil Nadu Police deployed 4,000 police officers to provide security during the Olympiad, on special duty from 25 July to 10 August. The Greater Chennai Police deployed an additional 22,000 police officers during Modi's visit to the city on 28 July. Flying of drones and other unmanned aerial vehicles was banned in the city limits in the period 28–29 July.

Because the event was held during the COVID-19 pandemic in India, the Tamil Nadu Health Department deployed medical teams and 30 ambulances to perform COVID-19 screening at airports, hotels and venues. Nearly 1,000 doctors and other health personnel were engaged for the Olympiad. Thirteen hospitals in and around Old Mahabalipuram Road and East Coast Road were utilised. The Government of Tamil Nadu issued health insurance cards to all players, covering medical expenses up to ₹2 lakh (US$2,100) per player.

COVID-19 PCR testing was performed on a randomly selected two per cent of all arriving flight passengers at the airport, including players, coaches, support staff and visitors. All passengers had to present a vaccine passport certifying they had received two doses of a COVID-19 vaccine, or a certificate of a negative PCR test taken within 72 hours before arrival. Thermal screening was applied to all players on a daily basis and symptomatic cases were isolated, tested and treated. Due to the 2022 monkeypox outbreak, players from outside India were required to also be tested for monkeypox.

Food safety officials inspected food served every day in all hotels accommodating players. Due to the elevated risk of malaria and dengue fever, continuous fogging and spraying measures were deployed to prevent mosquito breeding. Additional hygiene training and inspection was arranged. Around 100 staff from other districts were used to monitor food safety measures in all hotels.

=== Ticketing ===
The price of a full-day ticket for Hall 1 was ₹3,000 (US$31) for domestic visitors and ₹8,000 (US$83) for foreigners, while students under 19 years of age, women and government staff of Tamil Nadu could get a two-hour ticket at discounted price of ₹300 (US$3.10). A full-day ticket for Hall 2 was ₹2,000 (US$21) for domestic visitors and ₹6,000 (US$62) for foreigners, while the concession categories received a two-hour ticket for ₹200 (US$2.10). The high pricing raised concerns that people would not be able to pay the amount to attend the event. An official of the AICF explained that the pricing had resulted mainly from the fact that the event was held at a hotel with limited capacity of spectators compared to stadiums, while an official of the Tamil Nadu State Chess Association stated that all tickets for the event had been entirely sold. To prevent cheating using chess engines, players had to leave their mobile phones and any other electronic devices outside the playing halls.

== The event ==
A torch relay was held prior to the event, the first for a Chess Olympiad. It started on 19 July at the Indira Gandhi Arena in New Delhi, where FIDE President Arkady Dvorkovich handed the torch to the Indian Prime Minister Narendra Modi, who passed it to former World Chess Champion Viswanathan Anand. The torch was then taken to 75 cities in 40 days, finishing in Chennai where it passed through Shore Temple. Related events involved the Indian sport mallakhamba. The torch arrived at the venue in Mahabalipuram on the morning of 27 July, the day before the event.

=== Opening ceremony ===
The opening ceremony was held on 28 July at 16:00 IST (UTC+5:30) at the Nehru Indoor Stadium with an audience of more than 20,000 players, coaches and spectators. The opening address was given by Meyyanathan Siva V, then Tamil Nadu's Minister for Youth Welfare and Sport Development. A musical show, directed by Vignesh Shivan, was performed in which Kamal Haasan narrated the history of Tamil Nadu. Singers Dhee and Kidakuzhi Mariyammal performed the song "Enjoy Enjaami". A dance song, "Vanakkam Chennai, Vanakkam Chess", was also played. Pianist Lydian Nadhaswaram played classical and modern tunes, including a blindfold exhibition. There was also a flag parade that introduced the participating countries and their delegations.

The event was formally opened by Modi. In his speech, he discussed chess venues in Tamil Nadu and the Chathuranga Vallabhanathar Temple in Thiruvarur, where myth states God played chess with a princess. Chief Minister of Tamil Nadu M. K. Stalin also spoke, praising the organisation of the event in less than four months. He noted that the Olympiad would be held near the coastal town Sadurangapattinam, thought to be the home of chaturanga, a predecessor game to chess. FIDE President Arkady Dvorkovich also welcomed participants.

Anand passed the Olympic LED illuminated torch to Modi, who passed it to Indian chess players R Praggnanandhaa and Gukesh Dommaraju who "lit" the virtual Olympic cauldron.

=== Participating teams ===
The event was contested by a total of 350 teams, representing 190 national federations, both records for a Chess Olympiad. India, as host country, was permitted to field three teams in each of the two sections. The Women's tournament featured 162 teams, also a record, representing 160 federations. Russia and Belarus were banned from taking part by FIDE as a result of the ongoing Russian invasion of Ukraine. China declined to send a team. Pakistan boycotted the event and a team from Rwanda were prevented from attending by their own government. A team representing the Netherlands Antilles was permitted to compete, despite having dissolved itself in 2010, because the Curaçao Chess Federation remains officially registered as representing the dissolved country in the FIDE Directory.

Participating teams in the 44th Chess Olympiad
- Afghanistan^{a}^{d}
- Albania
- Algeria
- Andorra
- Angola
- Argentina
- Armenia
- Aruba
- Australia
- Austria
- Azerbaijan
- Bahamas
- Bahrain
- Bangladesh
- Barbados
- Belgium
- Bermuda^{a}
- Bhutan
- Bolivia
- Botswana
- Brazil
- British Virgin Islands^{a}
- Brunei^{a}
- Bulgaria
- Burundi
- Cameroon
- Canada
- Cape Verde
- Cayman Islands^{a}
- Central African Republic
- Chad^{a}
- Chile
- Chinese Taipei
- Colombia
- Costa Rica
- Croatia
- Cuba
- Cyprus
- Czech Republic
- DR Congo^{a}
- Denmark
- Djibouti
- Dominica^{a}
- Dominican Republic
- Timor-Leste
- Ecuador
- Egypt
- El Salvador
- England
- Equatorial Guinea
- Eritrea
- Estonia
- Ethiopia
- Faroe Islands^{a}
- Finland
- France
- Gabon
- Gambia
- Georgia
- Germany
- Ghana
- Greece
- Guam
- Guatemala
- Guernsey^{a}
- Guyana
- Haiti
- Honduras
- Hong Kong
- Hungary
- Iceland
- India (host nation)
- India-2
- India-3
- Indonesia
- Iran
- Iraq
- Ireland
- Israel
- Italy
- Ivory Coast
- Jamaica
- Japan
- Jersey
- Jordan^{a}
- Kazakhstan
- Kenya
- Kosovo
- Kuwait
- Kyrgyzstan
- Latvia
- Lebanon
- Lesotho
- Liberia
- Libya
- Liechtenstein^{a}
- Lithuania
- Luxembourg^{a}
- Macau^{a}
- Madagascar
- Malawi
- Malaysia
- Maldives
- Mali
- Malta
- Mauritania^{a}
- Mauritius
- Mexico
- Moldova
- Monaco
- Mongolia
- Montenegro
- Morocco^{a}
- Mozambique
- Myanmar
- Namibia
- Nauru^{a}
- Nepal
- Netherlands
- Curaçao (Netherlands Antilles)^{a}
- New Zealand
- Nicaragua
- Nigeria^{a}
- North Macedonia
- Norway
- Oman
- ~~Pakistan~~^{c}
- Palau
- Palestine
- Panama
- Papua New Guinea^{a}
- Paraguay
- Peru
- Philippines
- Poland
- Portugal
- Puerto Rico
- Qatar^{a}
- Romania
- ~~Rwanda~~^{c}
- Saint Kitts and Nevis^{a}
- Saint Lucia^{a}
- Saint Vincent and the Grenadines^{a}
- San Marino^{a}
- São Tomé and Príncipe
- Saudi Arabia
- Scotland
- Senegal
- Serbia
- Seychelles
- Sierra Leone
- Singapore
- Slovakia
- Slovenia
- Somalia
- South Africa
- South Korea
- South Sudan
- Spain
- Sri Lanka
- Sudan
- Suriname
- Sweden
- Switzerland
- Syria
- Tajikistan
- Tanzania
- Thailand
- Togo
- Trinidad and Tobago
- Tunisia
- Turkey
- Turkmenistan
- Uganda
- Ukraine
- United Arab Emirates
- United States
- U.S. Virgin Islands
- Uruguay
- Uzbekistan
- Venezuela
- **Vietnam**^{b}
- Wales
- Yemen^{a}
- Zambia
- Zimbabwe

Notes

^a Countries in italics denote those fielding teams in the Open event only.
^b Countries in bold denote those fielding teams in the Women's event only.
^c Countries in ~~strikethrough~~ registered for the event but withdrew or could not participate before it began.
^d FIDE officially recognises the flag of the Islamic Republic of Afghanistan.

=== Competition format and calendar ===
The tournament was played in a Swiss system format. The time control for all games was 90 minutes for the first 40 moves, after which an additional 30 minutes were granted; an increment of 30 seconds per move was applied from the first move. Players were permitted to offer a draw at any time. A total of 11 rounds were played, and all teams were paired in every round.

In each round, four players from each team faced four players from another team; teams were permitted one reserve player who could be substituted between rounds. The four games were played simultaneously on four boards with alternating colours, scoring 1 game point for a win and ½ game point for a draw. The scores from each game were summed together to determine which team won the round. Winning a round was worth two match points, regardless of the game point margin, while drawing a round was worth one match point. Teams were ranked in a table based on match points. Tie-breakers for the table were i) the Sonneborn–Berger system; ii) total game points scored; iii) the sum of the match points of the opponents, excluding the lowest one.

The event took place from 28 July to 10 August 2022. Tournament rounds started on 29 July and ended with the final round on 9 August. All rounds began at 15:00 IST (UTC+5:30), except for the final round which began at 10:00 IST (UTC+5:30). There was one rest day on 4 August, after the sixth round.

All times are IST (UTC+5:30)

**OC**	Opening ceremony	**A**	Arbiters meeting	**C**	Captains meeting	**1**	Round	**RD**	Rest day	**CC**	Closing ceremony

July/August	28th Thu	29th Fri	30th Sat	31st Sun	1st Mon	2nd Tue	3rd Wed	4th Thu	5th Fri	6th Sat	7th Sun	8th Mon	9th Tue
Ceremonies	**OC**												**CC**
Meetings	**A**												
Meetings		**C**											
Tournament round		**1**	**2**	**3**	**4**	**5**	**6**	**RD**	**7**	**8**	**9**	**10**	**11**

=== Open event ===
The Open tournament (Note: The open section was open to all players, and 13 out of 937 were female.) was contested by a total of 937 players from 188 teams. It featured five out of the top ten players from the FIDE rating list published in July 2022. World Champion Magnus Carlsen played for Norway. Former World Champion Viswanathan Anand decided not to play for India, acting as team mentor instead. Ian Nepomniachtchi and Ding Liren, who contested the World Chess Championship 2023, both missed the tournament due to Russia's suspension and China's withdrawal, respectively. Other top players who skipped the Olympiad include France's Alireza Firouzja and Maxime Vachier-Lagrave, with the latter citing the unfavourable weather conditions; Teimour Radjabov withdrew from playing for Azerbaijan shortly before the start of the tournament, due to suffering after-effects of a COVID-19 infection that he contracted following the Candidates Tournament 2022. Lê Quang Liêm also did not play, because Vietnam only entered the Women's event. Richárd Rapport could not compete, as he was in the process of switching federation from Hungary to Romania. Fabiano Caruana, Levon Aronian and Wesley So, all top ten in the FIDE rankings, played for the United States.

In the absence of Russia and China, the United States were regarded as favourites due to their average rating of 2771, higher than any other team. Anand described the team as "breathtaking", and Dutch player on board one Anish Giri said that the US team "not dominating the Olympiad would be a shocker". The host nation India had the second strongest team with an average pre-tournament rating of 2696, while Norway had the third highest average rating of 2692. Other pre-tournament favourites included Spain and Poland. The young squads of Germany, Uzbekistan and India's second team were also expected to be competitive.

==== Open summary ====
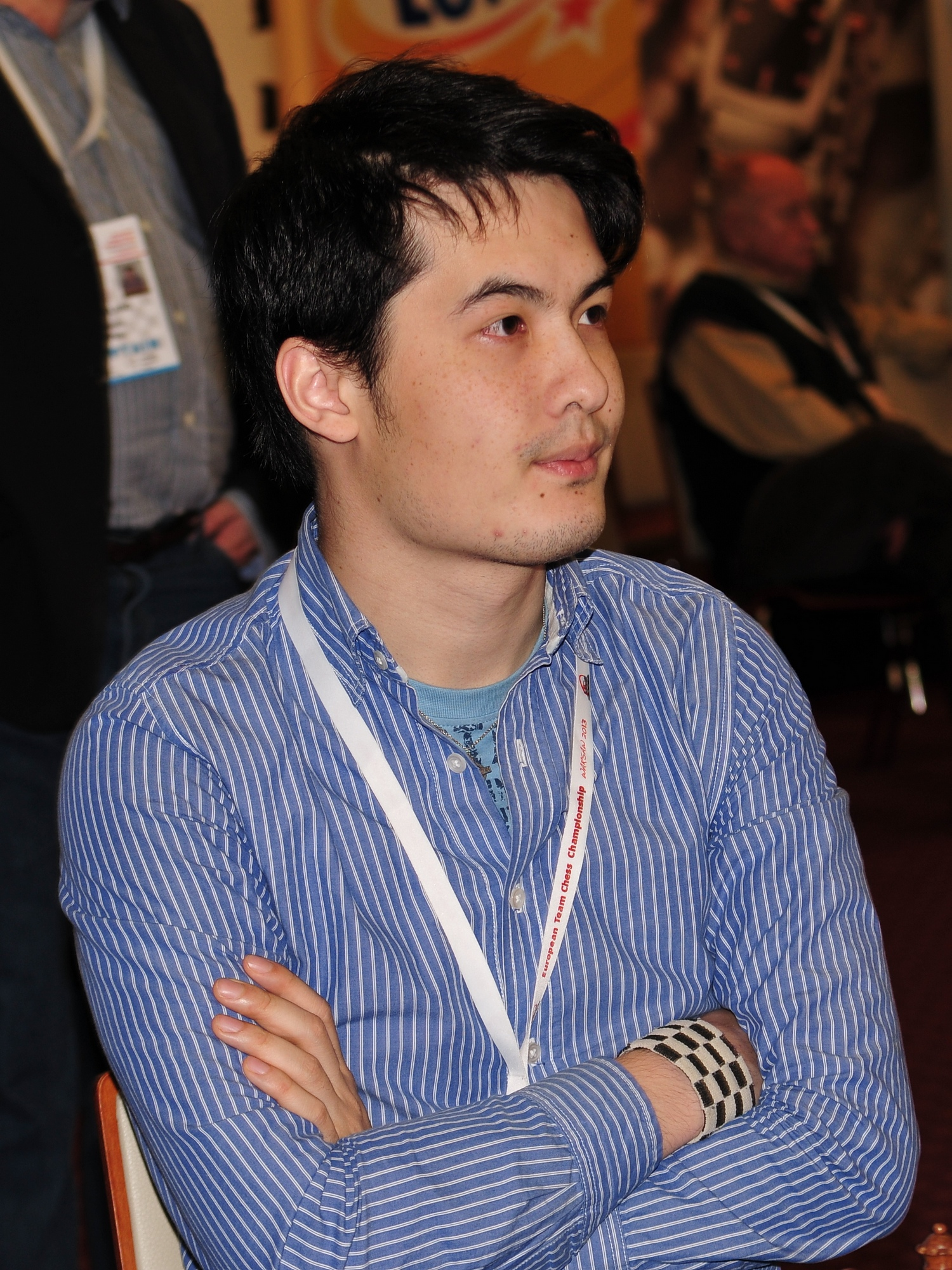
David Howell of England was the best individual player in the Open event.

Uzbekistan won the gold medal in the open event, with a total of 19 match points. Their eight wins and three draws made them the only undefeated team in the tournament. Following the tie with the United States in the fourth round, the Uzbek team was lagging a point behind Armenia until their head-to-head victory in the ninth round, which put them on top of the table, and the draw against the second team of India in the tenth round, which was enough to retain the lead. Armenia defied expectations to win the silver medal with equal number of match points as the winning Uzbek team but worse tie-breaker largely because of their head-to-head loss. The second Indian team won the bronze medal following a strong performance by 16-year-old Gukesh Dommaraju, who won eight consecutive games in the first eight rounds. Three teams scored 17 match points (seven wins, three draws and one loss each): the first Indian team came fourth, the United States fifth, and Moldova sixth. The heavily favoured US team failed to win a medal due to lacklustre performances from Caruana, who suffered three losses, and Aronian, who won only one game in the tournament.

The highest scoring individual player in the Open event was David Howell, playing for England on board three, who scored 7½ out of a possible 8 points (seven wins and one draw) with a performance rating of 2898. Individual gold medals were also awarded to Gukesh Dommaraju of India-2 who scored 9/11 with a performance rating of 2867 on board one, Nihal Sarin also of India-2 who scored 7½/10 with a performance rating of 2774 on board two, Jahongir Vakhidov of Uzbekistan who scored 6½/8 with a performance rating of 2813 on board four, and Mateusz Bartel of Poland who played the tournament as a reserve player and scored 8½/10 points with a performance rating of 2778.

Final standings
#	Country	Players	Average rating	MP	dSB^{†}
1st place, gold medalist(s)	**Uzbekistan**	**Abdusattorov, Yakubboev, Sindarov, Vakhidov, Vokhidov**	**2625**	**19**	**435.0**
2nd place, silver medalist(s)	Armenia	Sargissian, Melkumyan, Ter-Sahakyan, Petrosyan, Hovhannisyan	2642	19	382.5
3rd place, bronze medalist(s)	India-2	Gukesh, Nihal, Praggnanandhaa, Adhiban, Raunak	2649	18	
4	India	Harikrishna, Vidit, Arjun, Narayanan, Sasikiran	2696	17	409.0
5	United States	Caruana, Aronian, So, Domínguez, Shankland	2771	17	352.0
6	Moldova	Schitco, Macovei, Hamițevici, Baltag, Cereș	2462	17	316.5
7	Azerbaijan	Mamedyarov, Mamedov, Guseinov, Durarbayli, Abasov	2680	16	351.5
8	Hungary	Erdős, Berkes, Bánusz, Kántor, Ács	2607	16	341.5
9	Poland	Duda, Wojtaszek, Piorun, Moranda, Bartel	2683	16	322.5
10	Lithuania	Laurušas, Stremavičius, Jukšta, Pultinevičius, Kazakouski	2540	16	297.0

Notes

- Average ratings calculated by chess-results.com based in July 2022 FIDE ratings.
- ^† The Sonneborn–Berger score is a tie-breaking criterion used to rank teams with equal match points.

All board medals were given out according to performance ratings for players who played at least eight games at the tournament. David Howell on the third board had the best performance of all players in the tournament with a rating of 2898.

Board	Gold	Silver	Bronze
Board 1	Gukesh Dommaraju; India-2	Nodirbek Abdusattorov; Uzbekistan	Magnus Carlsen; Norway
Board 2	Nihal Sarin; India-2	Nikolas Theodorou; Greece	Nodirbek Yakubboev; Uzbekistan
Board 3	David Howell; England	Arjun Erigaisi; India	R Praggnanandhaa; India-2
Board 4	Jahongir Vakhidov; Uzbekistan	Paulius Pultinevičius; Lithuania	Jaime Santos Latasa; Spain
Reserve	Mateusz Bartel; Poland	Robert Hovhannisyan; Armenia	Volodymyr Onyshchuk; Ukraine

=== Women's event ===
The Women's tournament was contested by a total of 800 players representing 162 teams. It featured three of the ten top players according to the FIDE rating list published in July 2022: sisters Mariya Muzychuk and Anna Muzychuk, and Nana Dzagnidze. Since China withdrew and Russia was suspended, the other six players of the top ten were missing: Hou Yifan, highest rated woman player in the world; Ju Wenjun, current Women's World Champion and Tan Zhongyi from China, and Alexandra Kosteniuk, Aleksandra Goryachkina and Kateryna Lagno from Russia. The absence of Russia and China, which had together won the gold medal at nine of the eleven previous Olympiads, made India the first seed, with an average rating of 2486. Ukraine, with former Women's World Champion Anna Ushenina, were the second highest rated team averaging 2478, while Georgia were seeded third with 2475. Other medal contenders were expected to be Poland, France, Azerbaijan, the United States and Germany.

==== Women's summary ====
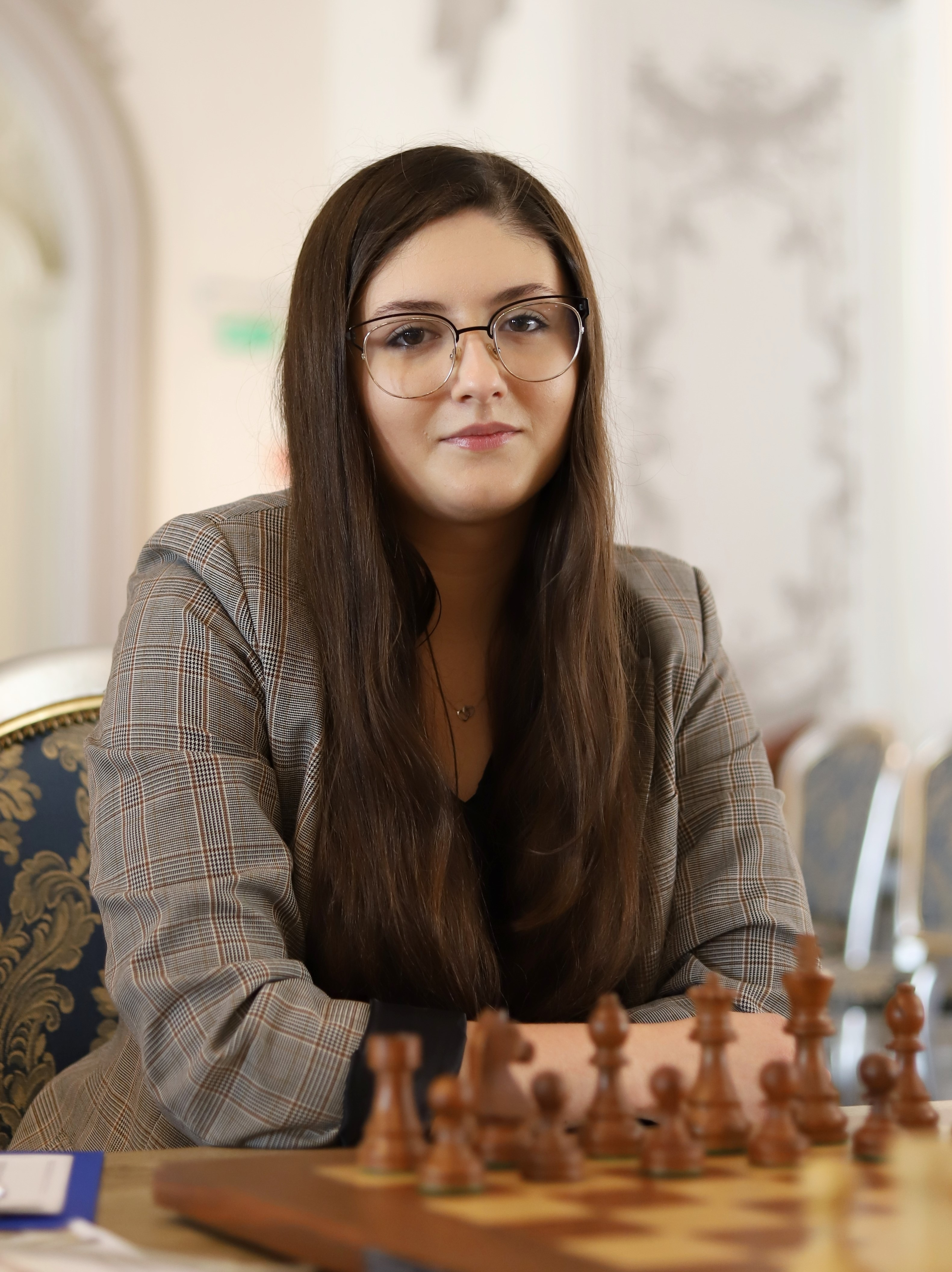
Oliwia Kiołbasa of Poland was the best individual player in the Women's event.

Ukraine won the gold medal with 18 match points from seven wins and four draws, making them the only unbeaten team. It was their second title, having previously won in 2006. The Ukrainians opened the tournament with a perfect score after four rounds before two consecutive draws against Azerbaijan and Romania in the fifth and sixth rounds set them back with a two-point deficit. However, following India's loss to Poland in the ninth round, they narrowed the gap to one point before the final round in which they beat Poland and benefited from India's loss against the United States to finish on top. Silver medallists Georgia also finished with 18 match points but had a worse tie-breaker. The bronze medal went to the first Indian team, who were leading the tournament by two points after seven rounds, before losing to Poland in the ninth round and the United States in the eleventh round, finishing on 17 match points. The United States and Kazakhstan had the same score as India but due to weaker tie-breakers finished in fourth and fifth place, respectively.

Oliwia Kiołbasa had the highest individual score in the Women's event, playing for Poland on board three, who scored 9½/11 (nine wins, one draw and one loss) and a performance rating of 2565 after she had opened the tournament with a perfect score of 9/9. Individual gold medals were also won by Pia Cramling of Sweden with 9½/11 and a performance rating of 2532 on board one, Nino Batsiashvili of Georgia with 7½/10 and a performance rating of 2504 on board two, Bat-Erdene Mungunzul of Mongolia who scored 7½/10 with a performance rating of 2460 on board four, and Jana Schneider of Germany who played as a reserve player and scored 9/10 points with a performance rating of 2414.

Final standings
#	Country	Players	Average rating	MP	dSB^{‡}
1st place, gold medalist(s)	**Ukraine**	**M. Muzychuk, A. Muzychuk, Ushenina, Buksa, Osmak**	**2478**	**18**	**413.5**
2nd place, silver medalist(s)	Georgia	Dzagnidze, Batsiashvili, Javakhishvili, Melia, Arabidze	2475	18	392.0
3rd place, bronze medalist(s)	India	Humpy, Harika, Vaishali, Sachdev, Kulkarni	2486	17	396.5
4	United States	Tokhirjonova, Krush, Yip, Zatonskih, Abrahamyan	2390	17	390.0
5	Kazakhstan	Abdumalik, Assaubayeva, Balabayeva, Nakhbayeva, Nurgali	2365	17	352.0
6	Poland	Kashlinskaya, Soćko, Kiołbasa, Malicka, Rudzińska	2423	16	396.0
7	Azerbaijan	Mammadzada, Mammadova, Beydullayeva, Balajayeva, Fataliyeva	2399	16	389.0
8	India-2	Agrawal, Rout, Soumya, Gomes, Deshmukh	2351	16	369.5
9	Bulgaria	Salimova, Peycheva, Krasteva, Antova, Radeva	2319	16	361.0
10	Germany	Pähtz, Heinemann, Klek, Wagner, Schneider	2383	16	344.5

Notes

- Average ratings calculated by chess-results.com based on July 2022 FIDE ratings.
- ^‡ The Sonneborn–Berger score is a tie-breaking criterion used to rank teams with equal match points.

All board medals were given out according to performance ratings for players who played at least eight games at the tournament. Oliwia Kiołbasa on the third board had the best performance of all players in the tournament with a rating of 2565.

Board	Gold	Silver	Bronze
Board 1	Pia Cramling; Sweden	Eline Roebers; Netherlands	Zhansaya Abdumalik; Kazakhstan
Board 2	Nino Batsiashvili; Georgia	Anna Muzychuk; Ukraine	Khanim Balajayeva; Azerbaijan
Board 3	Oliwia Kiołbasa; Poland	Anna Ushenina; Ukraine	R Vaishali; India
Board 4	Bat-Erdene Mungunzul; Mongolia	Maria Malicka; Poland	Tania Sachdev; India
Reserve	Jana Schneider; Germany	Ulviyya Fataliyeva; Azerbaijan	Divya Deshmukh; India-2

=== Gaprindashvili Trophy ===
The Nona Gaprindashvili Trophy, created by FIDE in 1997 and named after former Women's World Champion Nona Gaprindashvili, is given to the teams with the best combined performance in the Open and Women's tournaments (sum of their positions in both standings). The first team of India won the Trophy ahead of the United States in second place and the second Indian team in third place.

#	Team	Sum of positions
**1**	**India**	**7**
2	United States	9
3	India-2	11

== FIDE Congress ==
The 93rd FIDE Congress (Note: The FIDE Congress is an annual event that combines the sessions of FIDE's main bodies—namely, the General Assembly, the FIDE Council, the Zonal Council and the FIDE Commissions. In even years, it is preferred that the FIDE Congress takes place during the Chess Olympiad, and it is therefore organised by the organiser of the Chess Olympiad.) was held during the Olympiad, from 31 July to 9 August, with its General Assembly on 7 and 8 August. The FIDE presidential election took place on 7 August. Four sets of candidates were approved by the FIDE Electoral Commission, each consisting of a joint ticket for president and deputy president:

- Arkady Dvorkovich (president, incumbent) and Viswanathan Anand (deputy president)
- Andrey Baryshpolets (president) and Peter Heine Nielsen (deputy president)
- Inalbek Cheripov (president) and Lewis Ncube (deputy president)
- Bachar Kouatly (president) and Ian Wilkinson (deputy president)

Each ticket had to meet several requirements in order to be approved: it had to be submitted two months before the General Assembly; the candidates for president and deputy president could not be from the same member federation; and the ticket required endorsements from five member federations including one from each of the four FIDE continents, but no more than eight federations in total, and each federation was entitled to endorse only one ticket. The candidate ticket of Enyonam Sewa Fumey (president) and Stuart Fancy (deputy president) was rejected by FIDE because it had received support from member federations of Africa (Burkina Faso, Egypt, Togo and Senegal), Asia (Papua New Guinea) and America (Haiti) but not from Europe.

Inalbek Cheripov withdrew a few days before the election. On election day, each of the remaining candidates was allowed to speak to delegates for 15 minutes before the voting, in an order determined by drawing lots. Kouatly withdrew during his speech. Dvorkovich and Anand won in a landslide, winning 157 of the 179 federations who voted. Baryshpolets and Nielsen came in second with 16 votes.

Apart from the re-election of Dvorkovich as FIDE President, other notable decisions were made at the Congress. Uzbekistan was elected to host the 46th Chess Olympiad in either Tashkent or Samarkand. They were the only valid bid submitted by the 31 May 2022 deadline. Xie Jun of China, Sheikh Saud bin Adulaziz Al Mualla of the United Arab Emirates, Georgios Makropoulos of Greece and Michael Khodarkovsky of the United States were elected as FIDE Vice Presidents. The Mitropa Chess Association, a Central European chess organisation, was admitted, and the ASEAN Chess Confederation, a Southeast Asian chess organisation, was re-admitted as an affiliate member of FIDE.

== Year of the Woman in Chess ==
In January 2022, FIDE declared 2022 the "Year of the Woman in Chess". In that context, seven initiatives were planned to organise events and extend collaborations, including annual awards for women in various categories and a "Queen Pavilion" during the Chess Olympiad. On the first day of the Olympiad, the Queen's and Social Pavilion was opened by FIDE President Dvorkovich and Managing Director Dana Reizniece-Ozola. The winners of the Year of the Woman in Chess Awards were announced at a special ceremony which took place on 5 August. In the period preceding the ceremony, national chess federations were encouraged to submit nominations in different categories that covered almost all aspects of chess. Awards in each category were presented to overall winners, as well as to continental winners. The overall winners across award categories were:

- Spirit of FIDE: Dana Riezniece-Ozola (Latvia)
- FIDE ICON: Judit Polgár (Hungary)
- Outstanding chess player of 2021: Alexandra Kosteniuk (Russia)
- Outstanding chess administrator: Sonja Johnson (Trinidad and Tobago)
- Outstanding chess arbiter: Anastasia Sorokina (Belarus)
- Outstanding photographer: Anastasiya Karlovich (Ukraine)
- Outstanding 'game changer': Jennifer Shahade (United States)
- Outstanding chess educator: Alshaeby Razan (Jordan)
- Outstanding chess organiser: Cristina Pernici Rigo (Italy)
- Outstanding chess trainer: Shadi Paridar (Iran)
- Outstanding influencer/commentator/social media star: Tania Sachdev (India)
- Outstanding politician: Viktorija Čmilytė-Nielsen (Lithuania)
- Outstanding representation of 'He-For-She': Jean-Michel Rapaire (Monaco)
- Woman with disability for outstanding fighting spirit: Svetlana Gerasimova (Russia)
- Federation with the highest percentage of female rated players: Vietnam

The awards were provided by Alwahshi Abdullah Salem of the Saudi Arabian Chess Federation, which fielded a women's team at the Olympiad for the first time.

== Marketing ==
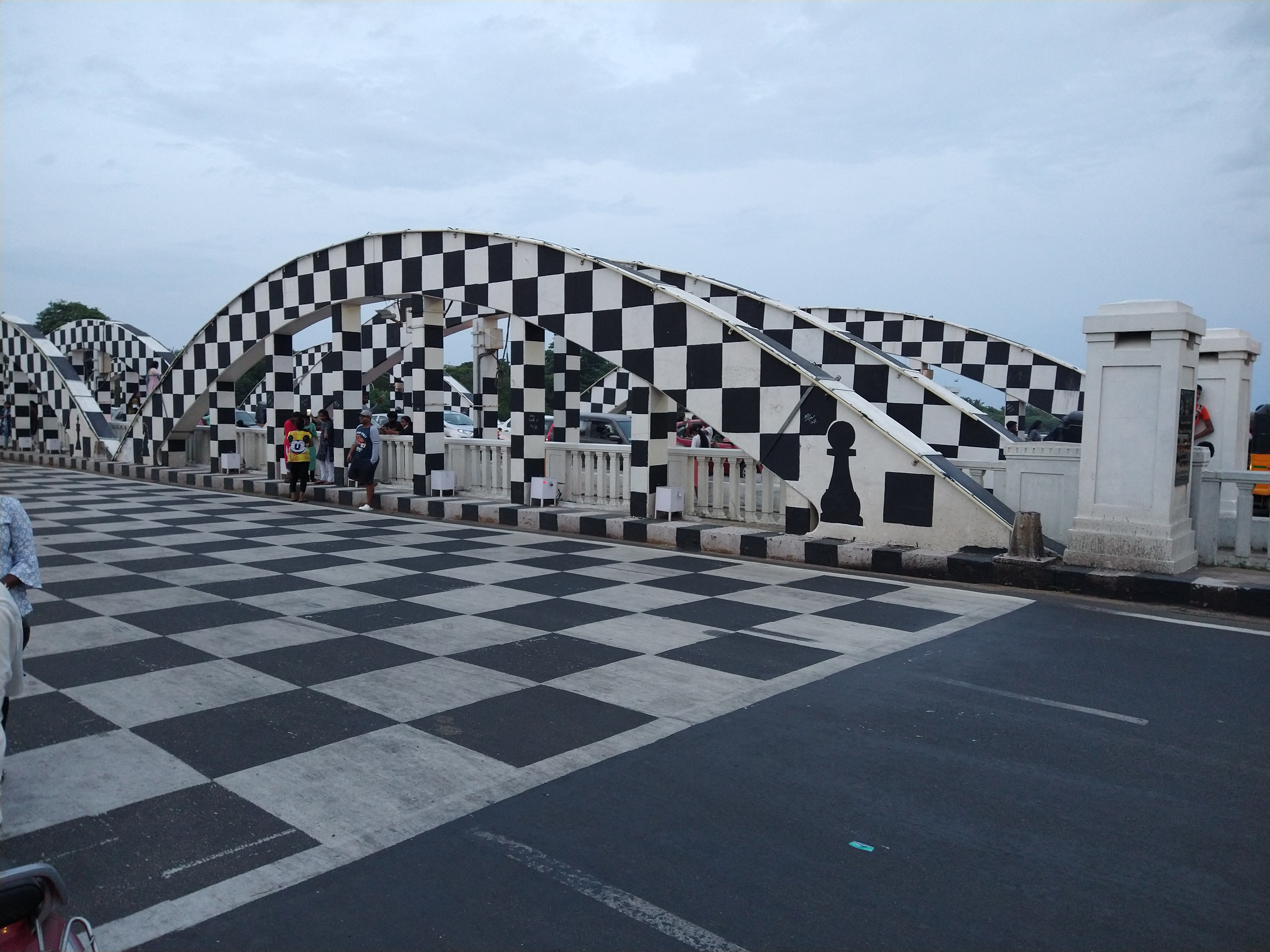
Napier Bridge in Chennai, painted with a chessboard pattern

=== Mascot ===
The official mascot was named "Thambi" (transl. younger brother), a chess knight wearing a vēṭṭi (the ethnic Tamil male attire) and a white shirt. He was depicted with folded hands, extending the Tamil greeting "Vanakkam". The mascot appeared on billboards, statues and posters. Commentators compared Thambi to 'Appu', the mascot for the 1982 Asian Games.

=== Promotional activities ===
Buses in Chennai were branded with the promotional slogan "Namma Chess, Namma Pride" (trans. Our Chess, Our Pride). Buses in Coimbatore and Tiruchirappalli also carried marketing for the event. The mascot Thambi was put at the "Namma Chennai" selfie point on the East Coast Road; a contest was held for images with the mascot posted on social media, with prizes of free tickets to the opening ceremony. Billboards were installed at major bus stops, and the event was also promoted at Chennai Metro stations. A private school in Perambur erected a 6,400-square-foot (590 m^{2}) giant chessboard for students to play the pieces. It was opened by P. K. Sekar Babu, Tamil Nadu's Minister of Hindu Religious and Charitable Endowments. The space around the chessboard was decorated with eight 14-foot (4.3 m) cut-outs of the Thambi mascot. India Post issued a postage stamp featuring the Olympiad. It was unveiled during a ceremony on International Chess Day. Sponsors for the tournament included Tech Mahindra, Smartwater, Indian Oil, Titan and Chessable.

Chennai's Napier Bridge was painted with a chessboard pattern, which divided opinion. While some commentators liked the artwork, others raised concerns that the pattern was disorienting, especially for people with anxiety disorder. The chessboard pattern also led to traffic congestion as people thronged to the bridge to take selfies and record videos for social media.

=== Side tournaments ===
FIDE held an online event in May 2020 titled 'Checkmate Coronavirus'. This consisted of 2,762 tournaments held simultaneously over a 30-day period, played by 120,000 unique participants from over 140 countries. The various winners of the event were awarded masterclasses with grandmasters, free tickets to the Olympiad, and/or souvenirs and memorabilia. Immediately prior to the Olympiad, on 24 July, a rapid chess tournament was held in Hall 1 and Hall 2, with 1,414 participants. Games from all 707 boards were broadcast live online. The winner of the event was Indian grandmaster Vishnu Prasanna, who scored a perfect 9 out of 9 possible points. First prize was ₹35,000 (US$360) and the total prize fund was ₹500,000 (US$5,200).

== Broadcasting ==
The Olympiad was broadcast live on FIDE's official YouTube channel, with commentary by grandmasters Judit Polgár and Mihail Marin. In India, television broadcast was on the Doordarshan channel. Chess24 provided online streaming commentary by grandmasters Peter Leko and Peter Svidler. Chess.com streamed the event through their ChessTV, Twitch and YouTube channels. ChessBase India also streamed the event live on their YouTube channel.

== Concerns and controversies ==
=== Doping restrictions ===
Russia's initial right to host the event raised concerns because of World Anti-Doping Agency's recommendation from November 2019 that the country should be banned from hosting all major events for a period of four years. Namely, Russian international teams engaged in widespread doping (illegal use of performance enhancing drugs) in multiple sports, with the complicit inaction of the Russian Anti-Doping Agency, which led the World Anti-Doping Agency (WADA) to launch an investigation. As part of their position that chess is a sport, FIDE is affiliated with WADA and implements drug testing at Chess Olympiads following WADA guidelines.

The Russian Chess Federation denied that WADA's recommendations applied to the Chess Olympiad, as its president Andrey Filatov stated in an interview that the decision to host the Olympiad was made long before WADA's decision. FIDE officially responded to WADA that the contracts for the two affected tournaments—Candidates Tournament 2020–2021 and the 44th Chess Olympiad—had already been signed and therefore they could not be moved. FIDE also argued that the events qualified for an exemption specified by WADA because they were the only valid bids to organise each event.

=== COVID-19 pandemic ===
As the COVID-19 pandemic spread around the world in early 2020, FIDE announced in March 2020 that the Chess Olympiad would be postponed. They planned to reschedule it in the summer of 2021 with the same host. In December 2020, when the pandemic was still ongoing, FIDE formally cancelled the event and planned to reorganise it for 2022.

Even after a two-year delay, the pandemic still affected participation in the Olympiad. The Chinese team, which won gold medals in both events at the 2018 Chess Olympiad, withdrew due to the pandemic. Azerbaijan's Teimour Radjabov, the winner of the Chess World Cup 2019, did not play, due to the after-effects of a COVID-19 infection that he contracted after competing in the Candidates Tournament 2022.

=== Russian invasion of Ukraine ===
Amid the international sanctions against Russia in response to the invasion of Ukraine in February 2022, FIDE announced that the Olympiad would no longer take place in Russia. This has resulted from a recommendation by the International Olympic Committee made in March 2022 to suspend Russia and Belarus from participation in international tournaments, including the Olympiad, that FIDE followed. Although their teams were not allowed to compete, the Russian and Belarusian national federations were permitted to take part in the FIDE Congress, submit candidates and vote in the FIDE presidential election held during the Olympiad.

Many Russian chess players disapproved of the invasion. Some decided to leave the country, switch federations, or play under the FIDE flag instead of the Russian flag. Forty-four top Russian players signed an open letter addressed to Russian President Vladimir Putin, stating their opposition to the war. Signatories included Ian Nepomniachtchi, Alexandra Kosteniuk, Peter Svidler, Andrey Esipenko and Daniil Dubov. Dmitry Andreikin, Alexandr Predke and Vladimir Fedoseev, who all played in the FIDE Grand Prix 2022 held in February and March, did not return to Russia and moved to North Macedonia, Uzbekistan and Spain, respectively. Daniil Yuffa, Kirill Alekseenko and Nikita Vitiugov also moved to Spain, while Alexey Sarana stayed in Belgrade after participating in a tournament there. Alina Kashlinskaya transferred her affiliation to Poland and played for them at the Olympiad.

=== Team flags ===
Competitors representing Afghanistan used the flag of the Taliban militant group, which took control of the country in 2021, instead of the flag of the Islamic Republic of Afghanistan which was still officially recognised by FIDE. Images of the Taliban flag at the Olympiad were widely circulated by Taliban officials and supporters on social media.

Kosovo declared independence from Serbia in 2008, and the Kosovo Chess Federation has been a full member of FIDE since 2016. However, India does not recognise the nation, so the hosts banned the flag of Kosovo at the Olympiad. The Kosovo team were therefore forced to play under the FIDE flag.

=== Other incidents ===
The torch relay passed through parts of Jammu and Kashmir and Ladakh, in the disputed region of Kashmir. The route stuck to locations administered by India as union territories, but those locations are also claimed by Pakistan (see Kashmir conflict). The Pakistan team had already arrived in India for the Olympiad. Nevertheless, the Pakistani federation withdrew from the event in protest, describing the torch route as "provocative".

A dispute over the financial management and governance at the Rwandan Chess Federation led to Rwanda's Ministry of Sport blocking the Rwandan team's participation in the Olympiad. The ministry and the country's Olympic committee had refused to recognise the federation since December 2021.

== See also ==
- Chess Olympiad
- Chess World Cup 2019
- FIDE Online Chess Olympiad 2020
- FIDE Online Chess Olympiad 2021

== Notes ==
Preceded by 43rd Chess Olympiad; Batumi, Georgia	Chess Olympiad; 44th Olympiad (2022); Chennai, India	Succeeded by 45th Chess Olympiad; Budapest, Hungary
