= Maria Malicka =

Maria Malicka may refer to:

- Maria Malicka (actress)
- Maria Malicka (chess player)
