= Valery Kazakouski =

Lithuanian chess grandmaster (born 2000)

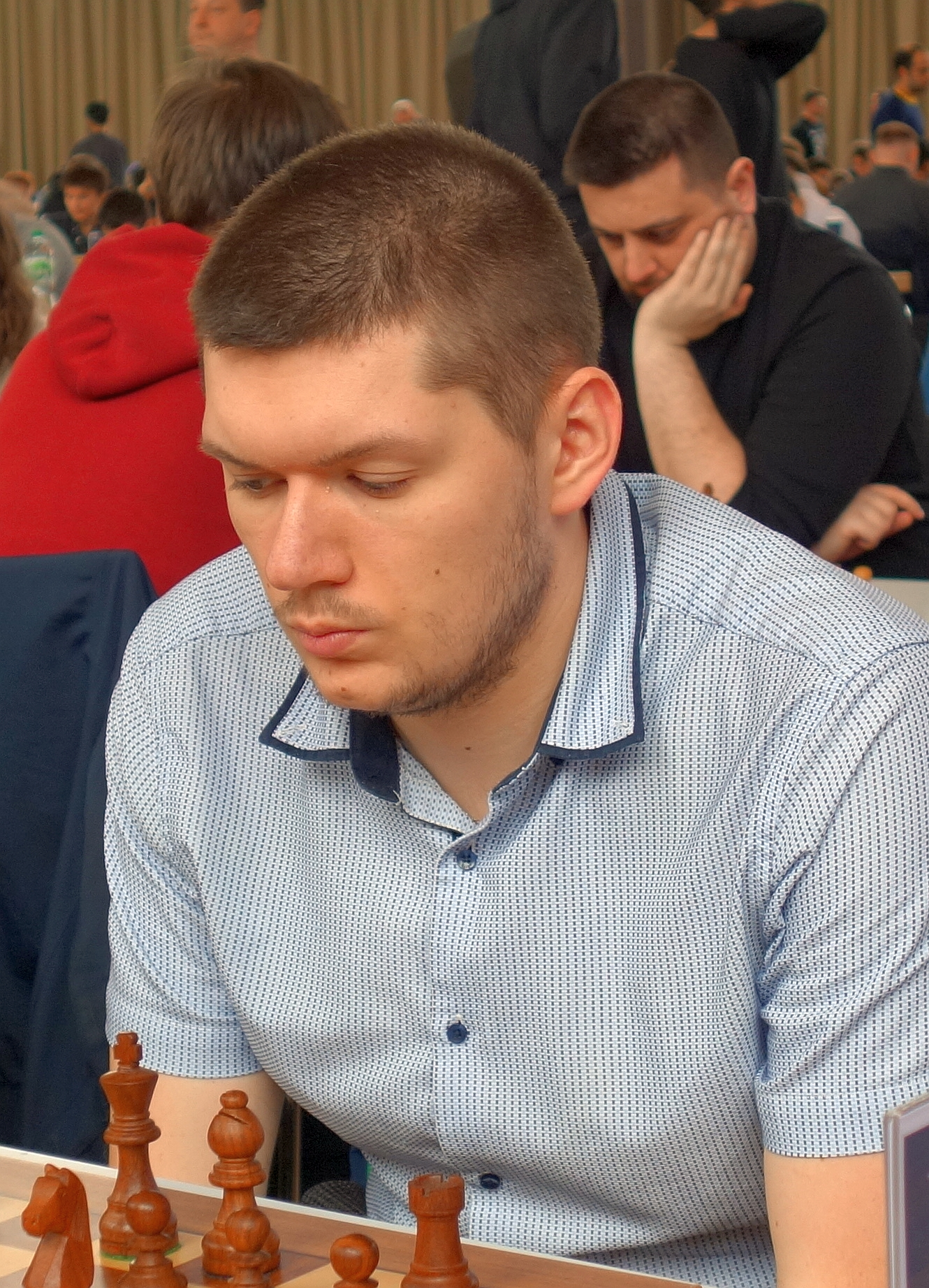
- Valery Kazakouski in 2024

Personal information
- Born: 14 July 2000 (age 25)

Chess career
- Country: Belarus (until 2019); Lithuania (since 2019)
- Title: Grandmaster (2022)
- FIDE rating: 2594 (July 2026)
- Peak rating: 2608 (March 2024)

Valery Kazakouski (Belarusian: Валерый Казакоўскі; born 14 July 2000) is a Belarusian and Lithuanian (from August 2019) chess player who holds the title of Grandmaster (GM, 2022).

== Biography ==
Valery Kazakouski was one of the leading young Belarusian chess players. He has been representing Lithuania since 2019. Valery Kazakouski has won 2 silver medals at the Lithuanian Chess Championships (2020, 2022). In August 2023, Valery reached the 1st place according to the standard rating among Lithuanian chess players.

Valery Kazakouski won international chess tournaments in Saint Petersburg (2019) and Panevėžys (2021).

In 2023, in Kaunas he won bronze medal in Lithuanian Chess Championship. In 2025, in Vilnius he won silver medal in Lithuanian Chess Championship.

Valery Kazakouski played for Lithuania in the Chess Olympiad:

- In 2022, at reserve board in the 44th Chess Olympiad in Chennai (+6, =1, -2).

Valery Kazakouski played for Lithuania in the European Team Chess Championship:

- In 2021, at second board in the 23rd European Team Chess Championship in Čatež ob Savi (+5, =2, -0).

In 2015, Valery Kazakouski was awarded the FIDE International Master (IM) title and received the FIDE Grandmaster (GM) title seven years later.
