= Oliwia Kiołbasa =

Polish chess player (born 2000)

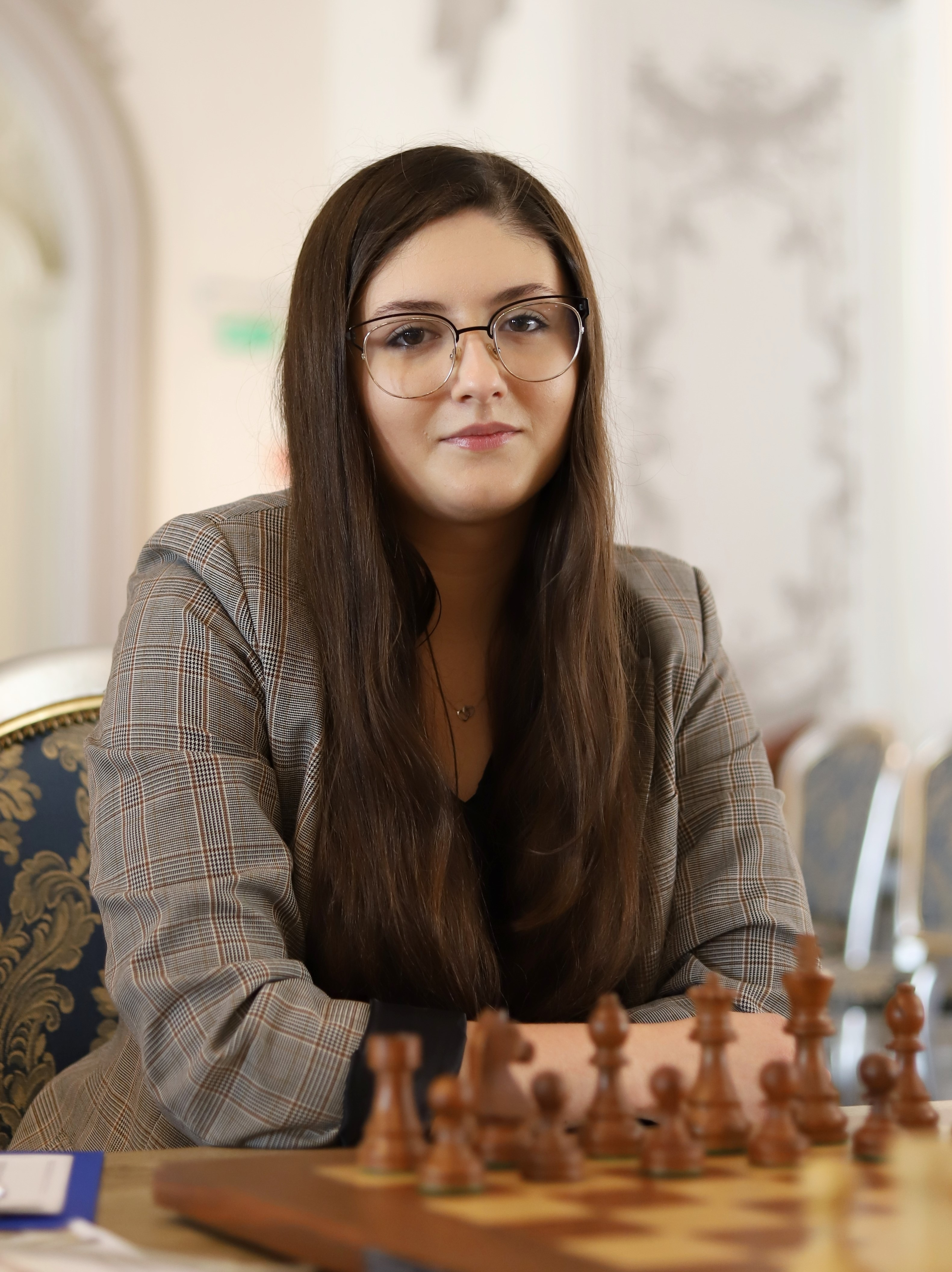
- Oliwia Kiołbasa in 2021

Personal information
- Born: 26 April 2000 (age 26) Augustów, Podlaskie Voivodeship, Poland

Chess career
- Country: Poland
- Title: International Master (2022); Woman International Master (2016)
- Peak rating: 2429 (April 2023)

Oliwia Kiołbasa ([ɔˈli.vja kjɔwˈba.sa]; born 26 April 2000) is a Polish chess player.

== Chess career ==
She has won the girls' under-10 European Youth Chess Championship, and was runner-up in the girls' under-14 World Youth Chess Championship.

FIDE awarded Kiołbasa the Woman International Master title in 2016.

In August 2021, Kiołbasa finished third in the Women's European Individual Chess Championship. She earned her first norm for the International Master (IM) title. Kiołbasa earned a second IM norm in the Polski Ekstraliga in October.

Kiołbasa represented Poland in the 2022 Chess Olympiad, winning her first nine games. She finished the tournament with 9.5 points out of 11 rounds. She earned her third and final IM norm, which qualified her for the IM title. She was the best individual player in the women's event. She defeated IM Vaishali R, which clinched a match win for Poland against India's first team. Her only loss was in the last round against Ukrainian GM Anna Ushenina.

In May 2024, in Rzeszów she ranked in 4th place in Polish Women's Chess Championship.

In March 2026, she won the Polish Women's Chess Championship held at Warsaw.
