= Chathuranga Vallabhanathar Temple =

Coordinates: 10.745710°N 79.417321°E

Religion
- Affiliation: Hinduism
- District: Tiruvarur
- Deity: Abathsagewarar Lord Shiva

Location
- Location: Needamangalam
- State: Tamil Nadu
- Country: India
- Interactive map of Chathuranga Vallabhanathar Temple

Architecture
- Type: Dravidian architecture

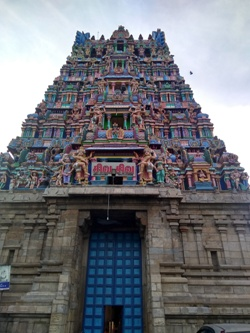
Rajagopura

Chathuranga Vallabhanathar Temple (சதுரங்க வல்லபநாதர் கோயில்) is a Hindu temple located between Needamangalam and Mannargudi in the Tiruvarur district of Tamil Nadu, India. The presiding deity is Shiva.

== Legend ==
According to Hindu legend, a childless king named Vasudevan worshipped Shiva and as a result Parvathi was born to him as Rajarajeswari. It is also believed that Shiva appeared to the king in the guise of siddha at this place and worsted him in a game of chess. As a consequence, he married Rajarajeswari.

== Significance ==
It is one of the shrines of the 275 Paadal Petra Sthalams. The temple is frequented by asthma patients. Sambandar had sung praises of the temple in his Thevaram.

== Gallery ==
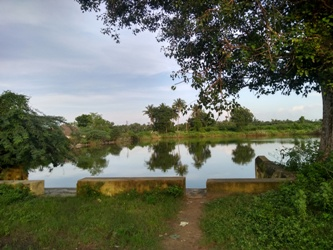
Temple tank

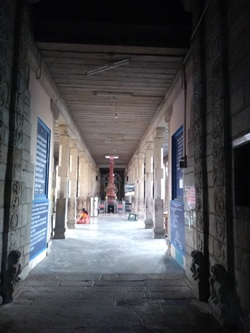
Front mandapa

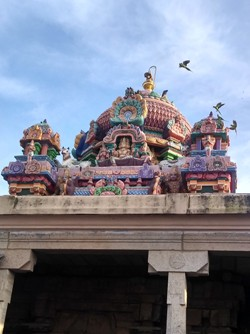
Vimana of presiding deity

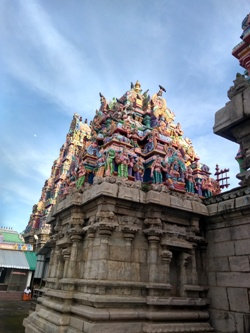
Vimana of Karpakavalli

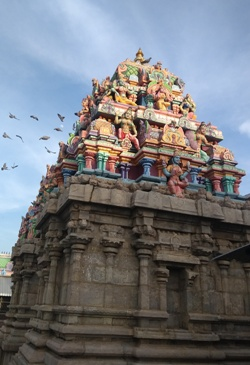
Vimana of Rajajeswari

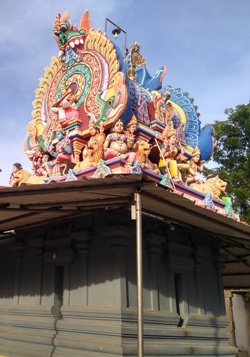
Vimana of Samundeeswari

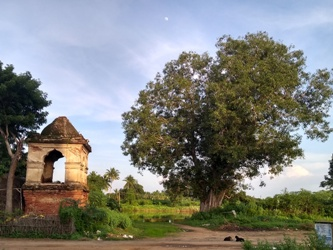
Mandapa near tank
