= International Chess Day =

International chess day observance, July 20

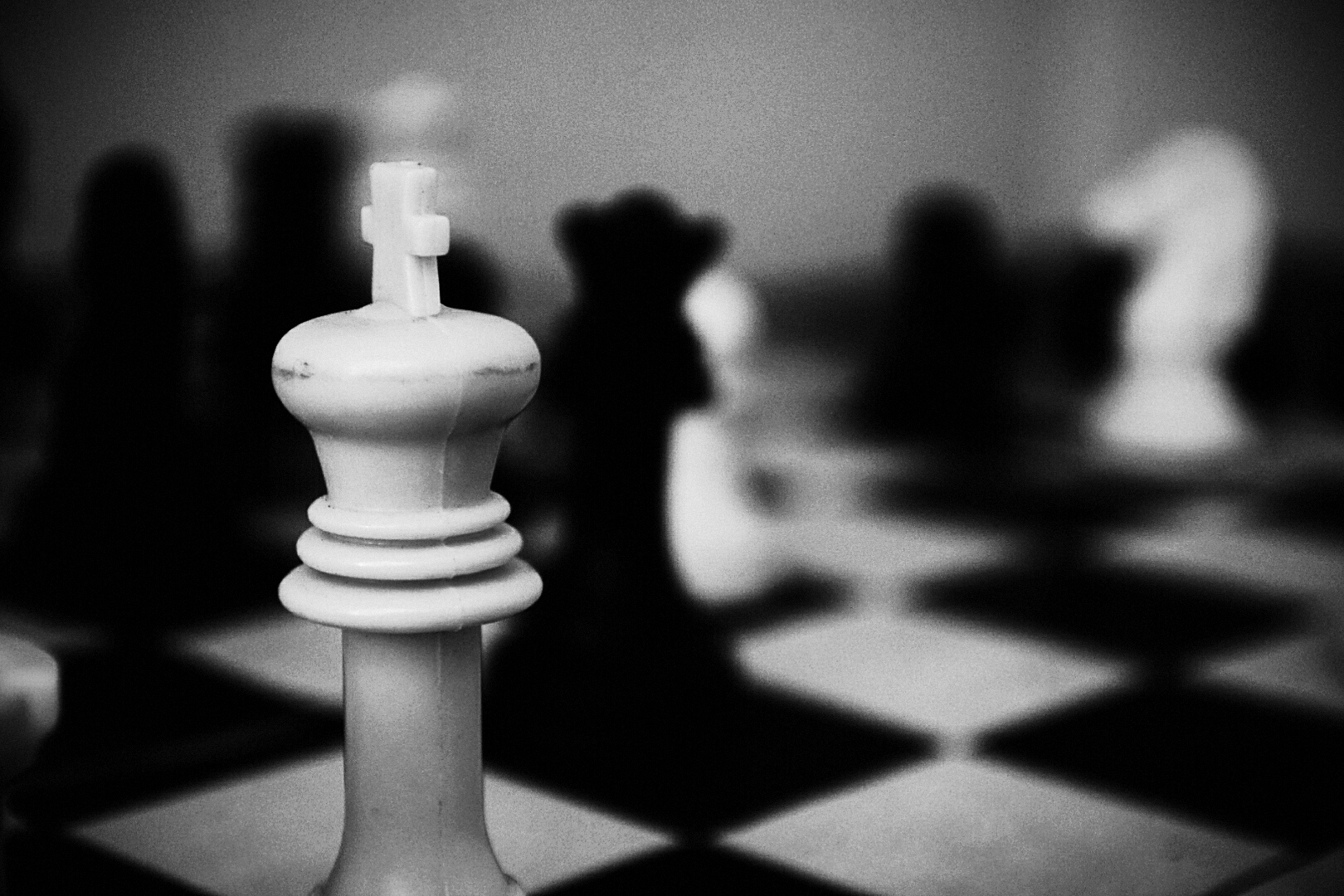
- Observed by: Various countries
- Date: 20 July
- Next time: 20 July 2027
- Frequency: Annual
- First time: 1966
- Related to: FIDE, Chess

International Chess Day is annually celebrated on 20 July, to commemorate the 1924 founding of the International Chess Federation (FIDE), the global governing body of chess.

The idea to celebrate an international day of chess was first proposed by UNESCO, and has been celebrated since 1966 after it was established by FIDE.

In 2013, International Chess Day was celebrated in 178 countries, according to Kirsan Ilyumzhinov, FIDE's President during that period.

On 12 December 2019, the United Nations General Assembly unanimously approved a resolution recognizing the day. The United Nations (UN) refers to the observance as World Chess Day and considers the day as a platform to promote dialogue, solidarity, a culture of peace, and linked to the UN's 2030 Agenda for Sustainable Development, including education, gender equality, and social inclusion.

On 20 July 2026, Chess.com released a new flair for everyone who logged in on that day, and held a special service renewing a player's highest streak on that date.
