= Mihaela Sandu =

Romanian chess player (born 1977)

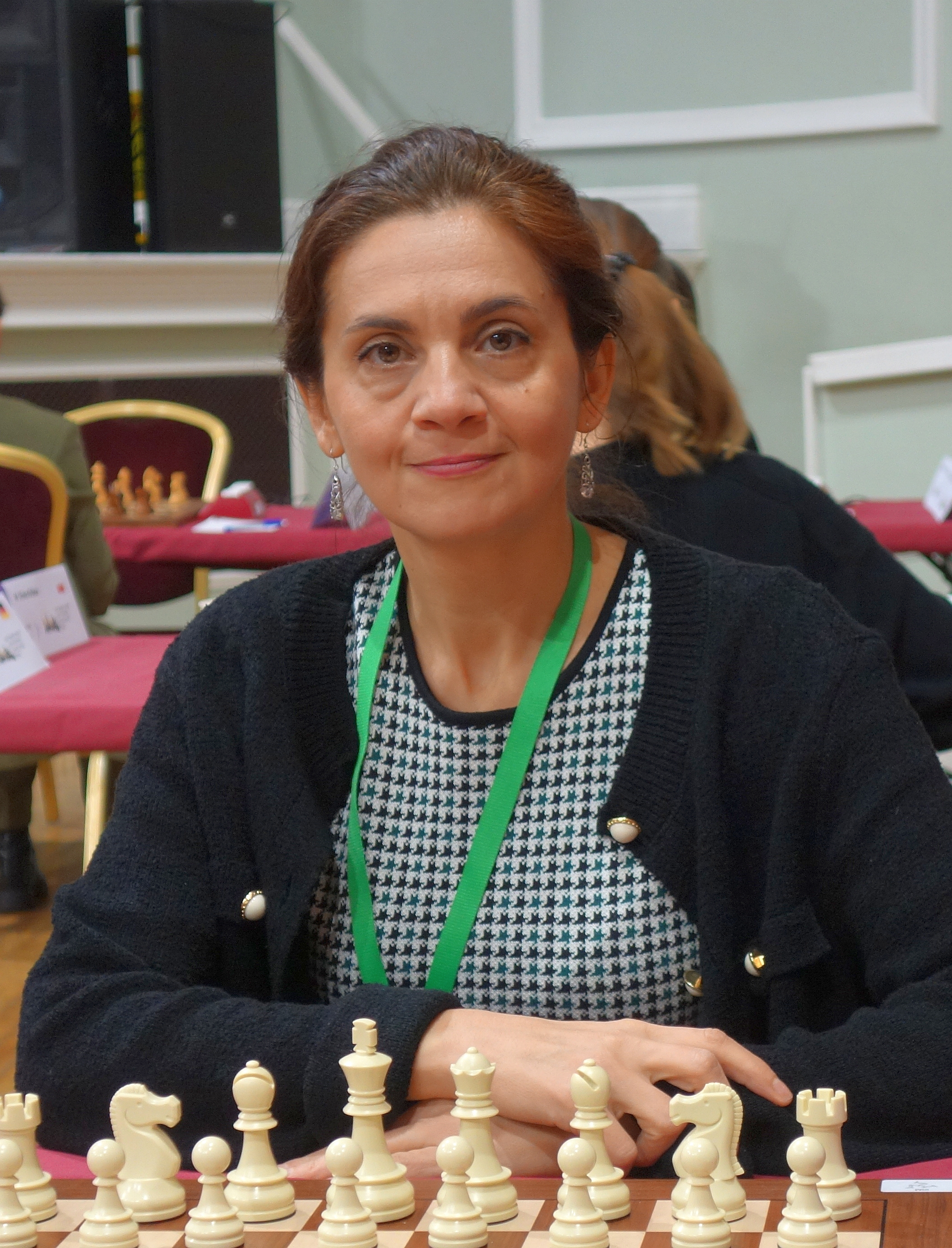
- Mihaela Sandu at FIDE Grand Swiss 2023

Personal information
- Born: 19 February 1977 (age 49) Ploiești, Romania

Chess career
- Country: Romania
- Title: Woman Grandmaster (2008)
- Peak rating: 2347 (June 2015)

Mihaela Sandu (born 19 February 1977) is a Romanian chess player who holds the FIDE title of Woman Grandmaster (WGM, 2008).

== Chess career ==
In 1991 in Mamaia, Mihaela Sandu won silver medal in the European Youth Chess Championship in age category U14. In 1993 she participated in the World Youth Chess Championship in age category U16. In 2003 in Bucharest Mihaela Sandu won the International Women's chess tournament Roses Cup Women. In Romanian Women's Chess championships she won silver (2014) and bronze (2013) medals.

Sandu played for Romania in the Women's Chess Olympiad:

- In 2012, at reserve board in the 40th Chess Olympiad (women) in Istanbul (+2, =1, −2).

She played for Romania in the European Team Chess Championships:

- In 2009, at fourth board in the 8th European Team Chess Championship (women) in Novi Sad (+2, =2, −2),
- In 2015, at reserve board in the 11th European Team Chess Championship (women) in Reykjavík (+4, =0, −3).

In 2007, Sandu was awarded the FIDE Woman International Master (WIM) title and she received the FIDE Woman Grandmaster (WGM) title year later.
