= Gergana Peycheva =

Bulgarian chess player (born 2003)

Personal information
- Born: 30 July 2003 (age 22)

Chess career
- Country: Bulgaria
- Title: FIDE Master (2018); Woman International Master (2020)
- Peak rating: 2348 (November 2021)

Gergana Peycheva (Bulgarian: Гергана Пейчева; born 30 July 2003) is a Bulgarian chess player who holds the titles of FIDE Master (FM, 2018) and Woman International Master (WIM, 2020).

== Biography ==
Gergana Peycheva played for Bulgaria in European Youth Chess Championships and World Youth Chess Championships. In 2014 Gergana Peycheva won European School Chess Championships in G11 age group.

Gergana Peycheva twice won Bulgarian Women's Rapid Chess Championships: 2019 and 2022.

Gergana Peycheva played for Bulgaria in the Women's Chess Olympiad:

- In 2022, at second board in the 44th Chess Olympiad (women) in Chennai (+3, =5, -1).

In 2018, she was awarded the FIDE Master (FM) title and received the FIDE Women International Master (WIM) title two years later. Also Gergana Peycheva is a FIDE Instructor (2020).
