= Nazerke Nurgali =

Kazakhstani chess player (born 2004)

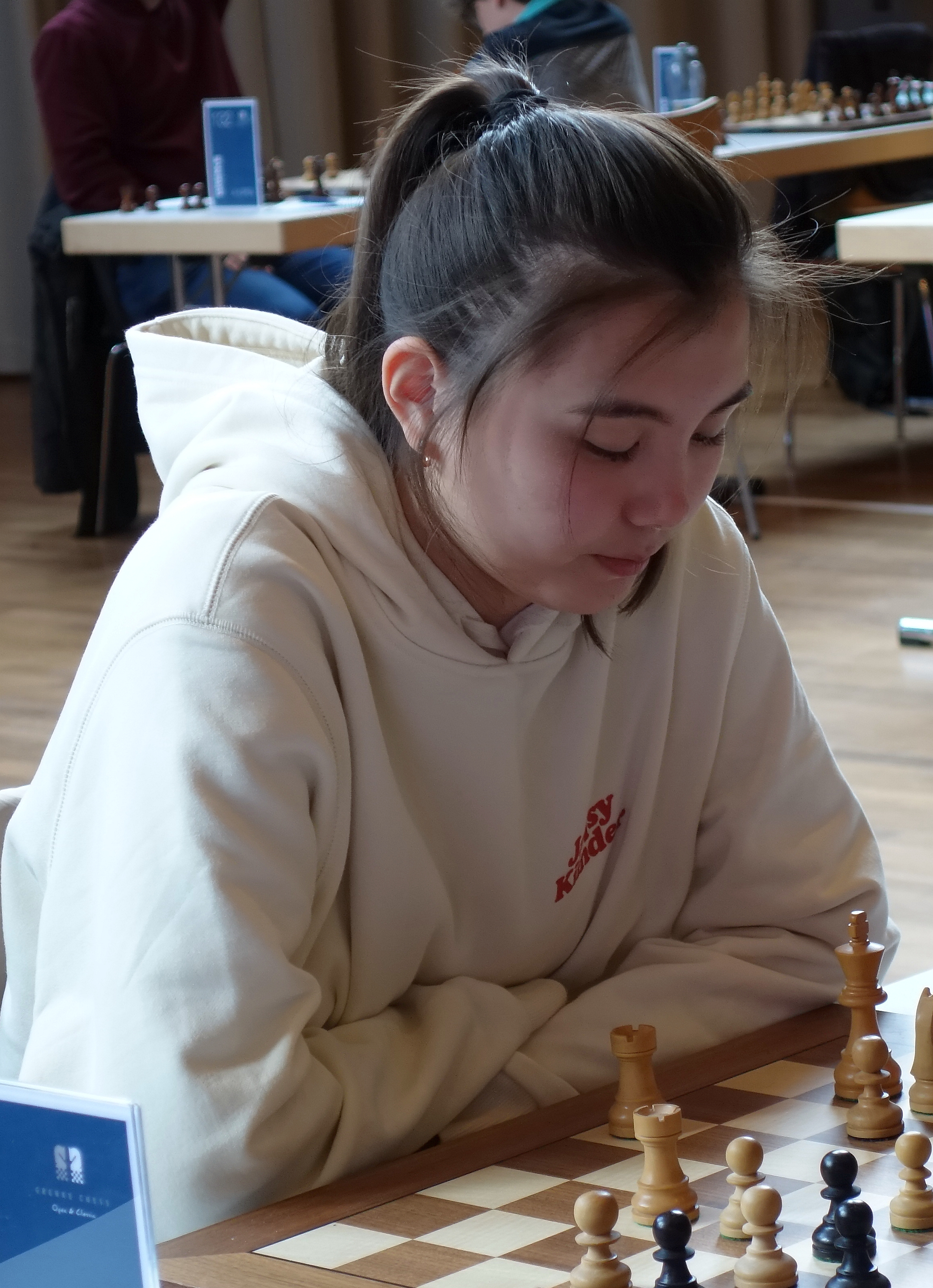
- Nazerke Nurgali in 2024

Personal information
- Born: 2004 (age 21–22)

Chess career
- Country: Kazakhstan
- Title: Woman International Master (2020)
- Peak rating: 2336 (December 2019)

Nazerke Nūrğali (Kazakh: Назерке Нұрғали; born 2004) is a Kazakhstani chess player who holds the title of Woman International Master (WIM, 2020).

== Biography ==
Nazerke Nurgali is a multiple winner and medalist of the Kazakhstani Youth Chess Championship in different age groups of girls: gold (2019 - G16), silver (2022 - G20) and bronze (2021 - G20, 2022 - G18).

Nazerke Nurgali played for Kazakhstan in Asia Youth Chess Championships and won three silver (2014 - G10, 2016 - G12, 2019 - G16) and bronze (2015 - G12) medals.

In 2019 Nazerke Nurgali won silver medal in World Youth Chess Championship in Girls U16 age group. In this same year she won World School Chess Championship in G15 age group. In 2022 Nazerke Nurgali won World Youth Blitz Championships in G18 age group.

Nazerke Nurgali played for Kazakhstan in the Women's Chess Olympiad:

- In 2022, at reserve board in the 44th Chess Olympiad (women) in Chennai (+1, =1, -2).

In 2020, she was awarded the FIDE Women International Master (WIM) title.
