= Bat-Erdene Mungunzul =

Mongolian chess player (born 2005)

Personal information
- Born: 7 January 2005 (age 21) Orkhon, Mongolia

Chess career
- Country: Mongolia
- Title: Woman Grandmaster (2026)
- Peak rating: 2402 (September 2026)
Medal record
World Chess Olympiad
Gold medal – first place	2022 Chennai	Individual

External image
- Mungunzul atop the Olympic podium

Bat-Erdene Mungunzul (Mongolian: Бат-Эрдэнийн Мөнгөнзул, romanized: Bat-Erdeniin Möngönzul; born 7 January 2005 in Orkhon, Mongolia) is a Mongolian chess player who won an individual gold medal in the 44th Chess Olympiad.

A native of the aimag of Orkhon, Mungunzul is a member of the Khangarid sports club in Orkhon's capital Erdenet. She earned the FIDE title of Woman Candidate Master in 2014.

== Early life and education ==
Bat-Erdene Mungunzul was born on 7 January 2005 in Orkhon, Mongolia, to Sh. Tsevelmaa and N. Bat-Erdene, and is one of six children in her family. Her mother is originally from Tarialan sum in the aimag of Uvs.

Mungunzul began playing chess at the age of five. Bat-Erdene, her father, had also played chess when he was a child, having learnt the game from his aunt, so when Mungunzul came home from kindergarten one day stating that she wanted to go to the chess club, her dad taught her how to play the game.

== Career ==
In 2015, Mungunzul took part in the Asian Youth Chess Championship held in Suwon, South Korea, and won a silver medal in the under-10 girls division.

At the World Youth Chess Championship 2019 held in Mumbai, India, Mungunzul was initially the leader in the under-14 girls division, but was eventually defeated by Rakshitta Ravi. Mungunzul ended the tournament in fourth place.

In 2022, at the 44th Chess Olympiad held in Chennai, India, Mungunzul won an individual gold medal on board four, finishing with a performance rating of 2460.
