= Michael Khodarkovsky =

American chess player and coach (born 1958)

Personal information
- Born: July 21, 1958 (age 68) Odesa, Ukrainian SSR, Soviet Union

Chess career
- Country: Ukraine (until 2007); United States (since 2007)
- Peak rating: 2290 (July 1990)

Michael Khodarkovsky is an American chess player and coach. Since 2018, Michael has been elected as vice president of the FIDE Presidential Board.

Since 1992 he has made his home in New Jersey. He is the Founder and Director of International Chess School, which conducts programs at public and private schools in New Jersey and New York, and sponsors youth programs worldwide.

Khodarkovsky is also the President of the Kasparov Chess Foundation, Chair of International Affairs Committee of the US Chess Federation and has been the US Chess Delegate to FIDE. He served as Councilor of the FIDE Trainers Commission from 2004 - 2014. He was a member of Kasparov's coaching team during the 1995 and 2000 World Championship matches and during the 1996 and 1997 matches versus IBM's computer Deep Blue. In 2004, he served as the head coach of the U.S. Women's Team, which won the Silver medal at the 36th Chess Olympiad. He coached numerous State, National, Continental, and World Youth champions. In 2004, the New Jersey State Chess Federation named him Coach of the Year. In 2008 and 2010, Khodarkovsky was Captain of the U.S. Women's Team, which won the Bronze medal at the 38th and tied for third at the 39th World Chess Olympiads respectively. Michael was a coach of the 2005-2017 United States team at the World Youth Chess Championships.

Khodarkovsky is the winner of the 2008 Scholastic Service Award by the US Chess Federation. He is also the author of chess books, manuals, and articles published in USA, UK, Japan, South Korea, Greece, Russia, Ukraine, and Latvia.

== Early life ==
Michael Khodarkovsky was born in Odessa, Ukraine, on July 21, 1958. Michael was a chess trainer in the Soviet Union prior to immigrating to the United States in 1992. He served as coach for grandmasters Gennadi Zaichik, Vereslav Eingorn, and many others. From 1982 to 1992, he was a coach at the Chess Olympic School in Odessa. In 1985, he became the coach for the Ukrainian National Chess Team for the prestigious USSR Cup. In 1988, he was the coach for the winning Ukrainian Junior Team at the Grand Prix of Czechoslovakia in Prague. From 1990 to 1991, he was the chess consultant for chess clubs in Belgrade and Prague. Michael was also a popular chess columnist and he had his own columns in daily newspapers. His columns were named best chess columns in the country in 1985-1986.

== Kasparov Chess Foundation ==
Between 1999 and 2000, Michael served as Chief Educational Content Officer at Kasparov Chess Online, created and managed the World Schools Chess Championships online. In 2002, he became one of the founders and currently serves as President of the Kasparov Chess Foundation, a U.S. nonprofit organization that promotes chess in education worldwide.

== Books ==
- Michael Khodarkovsky (1997) A New Era: World Championship Chess in the Age of Deep Blue, Ballantine Books
- Michael Khodarkovsky (2003), The Grünfeld Defence Revealed, Batsford, ISBN 0-7134-8827-1
- Michael Khodarkovsky (2005), Gruenfeld Defense Revealed, Batsford, London, UK
- Michael Khodarkovsky (2006), Teaching Chess Step By Step, Kasparov Chess Foundation
- Michael Khodarkovsky (2014), Double Rook Endings, FIDE, Greece
- Michael Khodarkovsky (2014), Chess GPS - Improvement of Your Position (Russian Edition), Wildside Press
- Michael Khodarkovsky (2017), Chess GPS - Improvement of Your Position, Wildside Press
