= Anastasiya Karlovich =

Ukrainian chess player and journalist (born 1982)

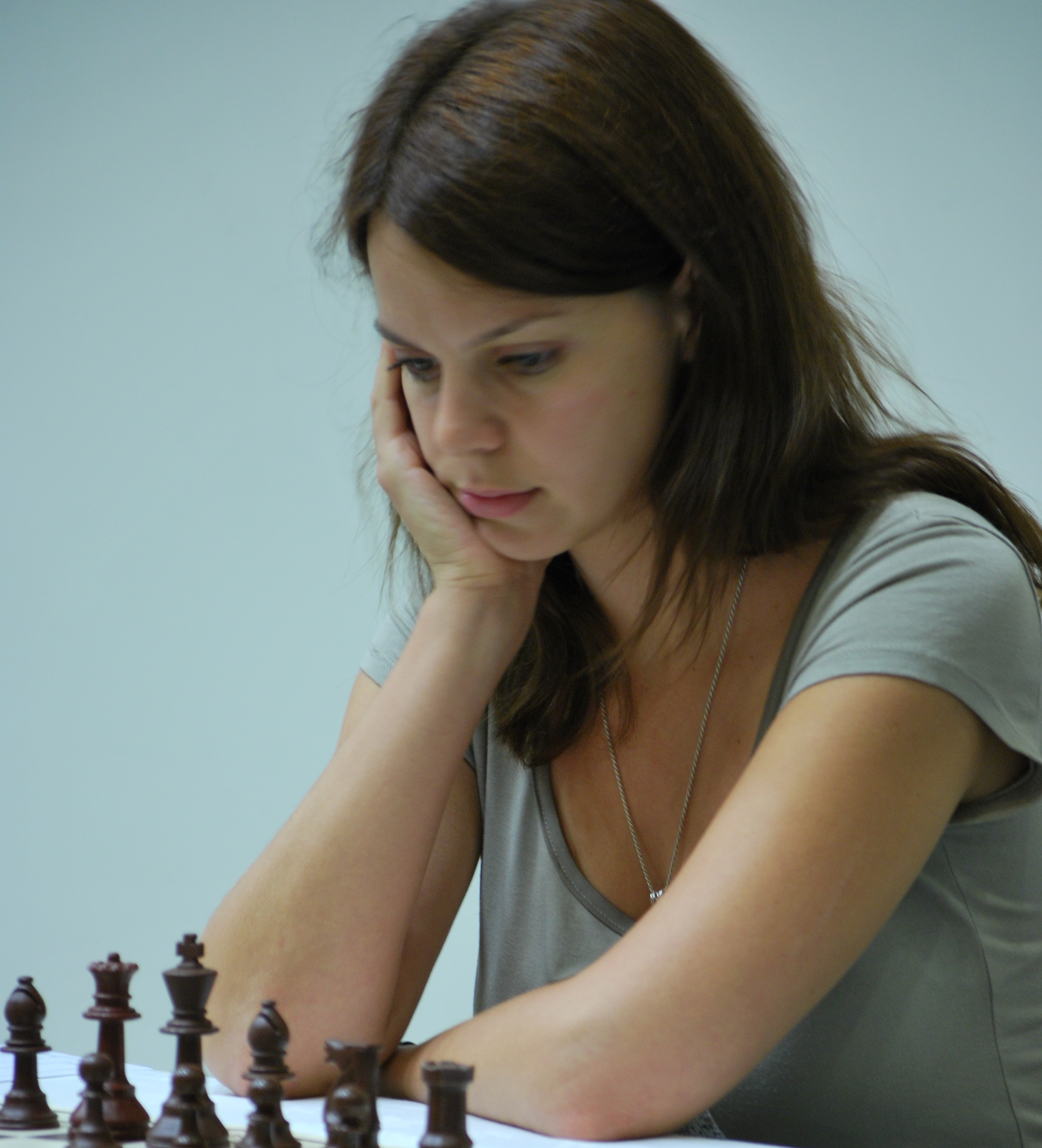

Personal information
- Born: 29 May 1982 (age 44) Dnipropetrovsk, Ukrainian SSR, Soviet Union

Chess career
- Country: Ukraine
- Title: Woman Grandmaster (2003)
- Peak rating: 2313 (October 2001)

Anastasiya Valeriyevna Karlovich (born 29 May 1982, also spelled Anastazia) is a Ukrainian chess player and journalist. She achieved the FIDE titles Woman International Master in 2000 and Woman Grandmaster in 2003.

Born in Dnipropetrovsk, Karlovich started to play chess at age eight. She was the women's chess champion of the Dnipropetrovsk Oblast and the semi-finalist of the Dnipropetrovsk Oblast men's chess championship in 1998. She later moved to Kharkiv and in 2007 became a chess journalist as well, having published articles in the newspaper Ladya, magazines New in Chess and Schach 64, the ChessBase website and elsewhere. Karlovich was the press secretary of FIDE at the World Chess Championship in 2012, 2013, 2014 and 2016.

She played on the first board for the gold medal-winning Ukrainian team in the European Girls' Under-18 Team Chess Championship in 2000.
