= Jana Schneider (chess player) =

German chess player (born 2002)

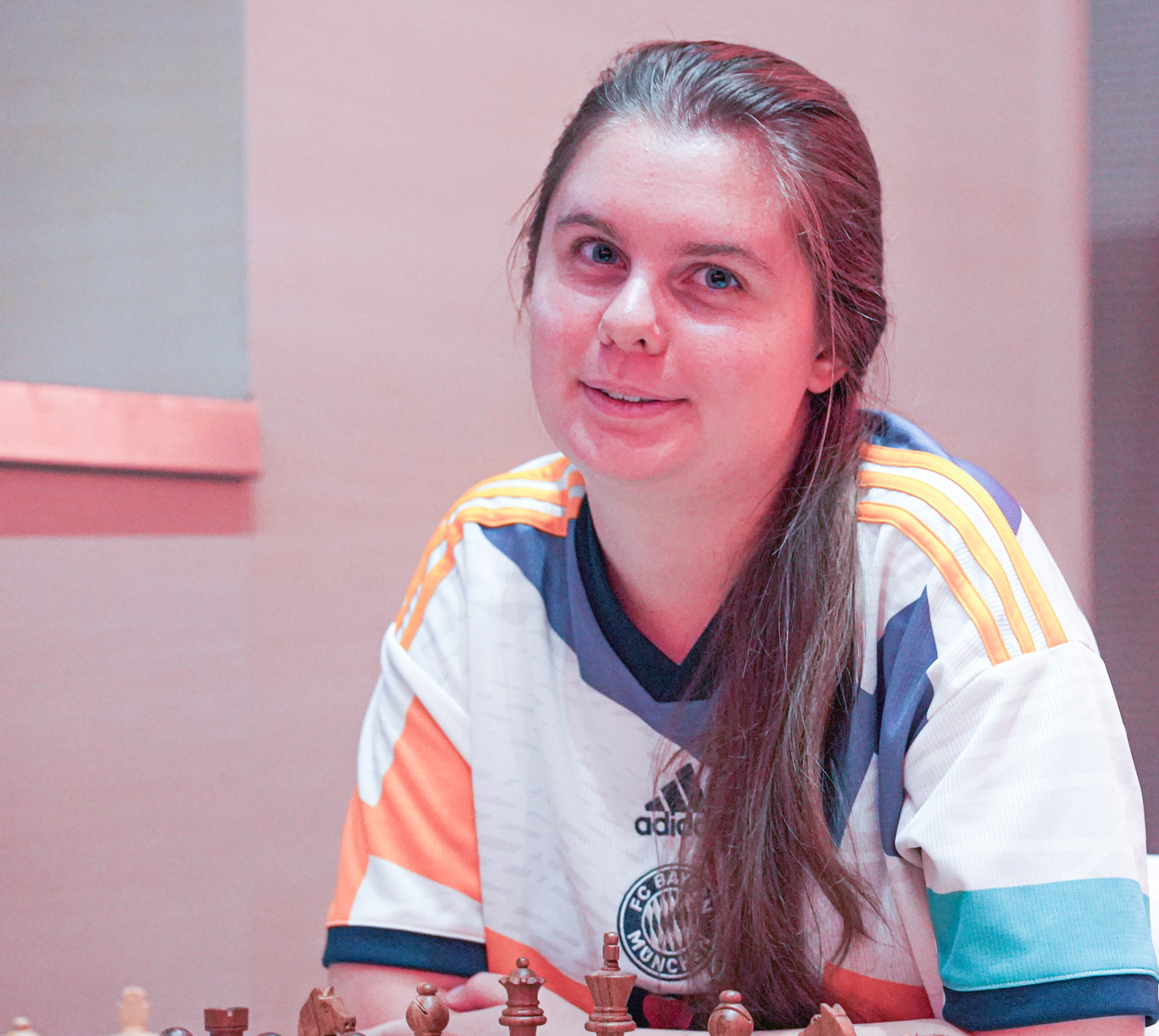
- Jana Schneider at the Sportland-NRW-Cup in Dortmund

Personal information
- Born: April 11, 2002 (age 24)

Chess career
- Country: Germany
- Title: FIDE Master (2016); Woman Grandmaster (2021)
- Peak rating: 2353 (July 2021)

Jana Schneider (born 2002) is a German chess player. She was awarded the title of FIDE Master in 2016.

== Chess career ==
She qualified for the Women's Chess World Cup 2021, where she was defeated 2–0 by Medina Warda Aulia in the first round. She represented Germany as a reserve player in the 44th Chess Olympiad and scored 9 out of 10 points with a rating performance of 2414.

In July 2026, she won the German Women's Chess Championship held in Dresden.
