= Maria Malicka (chess player) =

Polish chess player (born 2003)

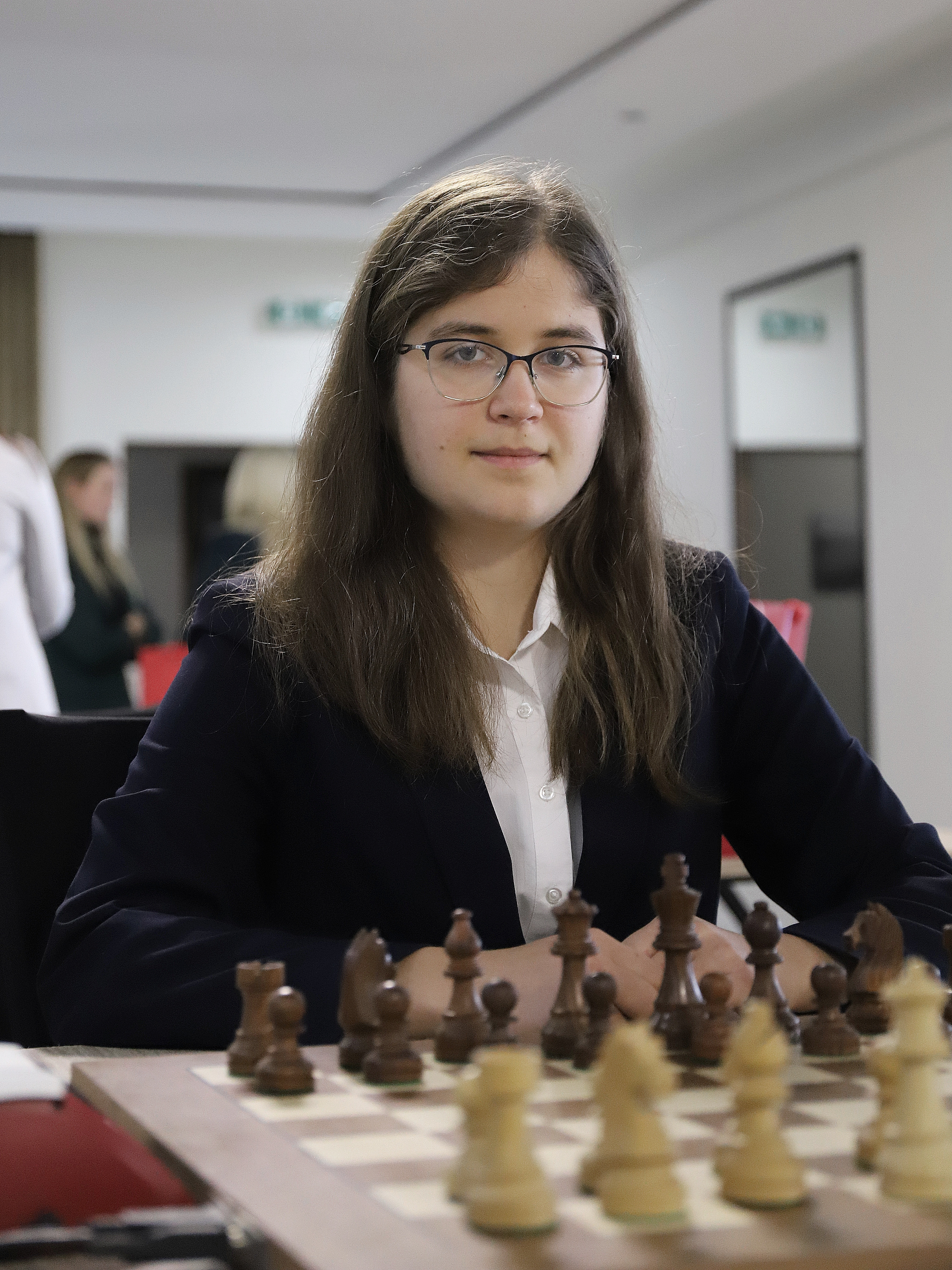
- Maria Malicka, Kruszwica 2022

Personal information
- Born: 13 April 2003 (age 23)

Chess career
- Country: Poland
- Title: FIDE Master (2020); Woman Grandmaster (2023)
- Peak rating: 2393 (July 2022)

Maria Malicka (born 13 April 2003) is a Polish chess Woman Grandmaster (2023). She is Chess Olympiad individual silver medal winner (2022).

== Chess career ==
In 2010, in Suwałki, Maria Malicka won the 3rd place of Polish Chess Championship for Preschoolers in U10 age group. She won three medals of the Polish Youth Chess Championships: gold (Jastrzębia Góra 2018 - U18 group), silver (Szklarska Poręba 2020 - U20 group) and bronze (Suwałki 2015 - U12 group). In 2021 in Pokrzywna she won Polish Junior Chess Championship in girls U20 age group.

Maria Malicka was also a one-time medalist of the Polish Youth Rapid Chess Championship where she won a bronze medal in Rzeszów in 2019 in U19 age group and a two-time medalist of the Polish Youth Blitz Chess Championship where she won bronze in Rzeszów in 2019 (U16) and silver in Wrocław in 2020 (U18). She three times represented Poland at the European Youth Chess Championship where achieved the best result in Bratislava in 2019 in U16 age group - 5th place. She won two tournaments in Warsaw in 2016: 168th YMCA Spring 2016-B and 174th YMCA Autumn 2016-A.

In 2022 in Kruszwica, Maria Malicka made her debut in the Polish Women's Chess Championship and won bronze medal.

In the summer of 2022 in Chennai, Maria Malicka participated with the Polish women's national team in 44th Chess Olympiad, where she won 2nd place at the board 4.
