= Gabriela Antova =

Bulgarian chess player

Personal information
- Born: 6 January 2002 (age 24) Sofia, Bulgaria

Chess career
- Country: Bulgaria
- Title: FIDE Master (2016); Woman Grandmaster (2023)
- FIDE rating: 2288 (December 2021)
- Peak rating: 2335 (April 2017)

Gabriela Antova (Bulgarian: Габриела Антова; born 6 January 2002) is a Bulgarian chess player.

== Biography ==
Antova started playing chess at the age of seven. She repeatedly represented Bulgaria at the European Youth Chess Championships and World Youth Chess Championships in different age groups, where she won four medals: gold (in 2010, at the European Youth Chess Championship in the U8 girls age group), silver (in 2016, at the European Youth Chess Championship in the U14 girls age group) and two bronze (in 2013, at the European Youth Chess Championship in the U12 girls age group, and in 2018, at the European Youth Chess Championship in the U16 girls age group). In 2014, she ranked 4th in World Youth Chess Championship in the U12 girls age group. She is multiple winner of Bulgarian and European Girl's Championships in fast chess and chess blitz in different age groups.

Since 2014, Antova has regularly participated in the Bulgarian Women's Chess Championship finals, where she presented the best result in 2017 when she shared 3rd-5th place, but stayed fourth due to tiebreaks.

In 2017, in Riga, Antova participated in Women's European Individual Chess Championship.

She received the Woman FIDE Master (WFM) title in 2010, the FIDE Master (FM) title in 2016, and the Woman International Master (WIM) title in 2018.
