= Open event at the 45th Chess Olympiad =

2024 chess tournament in Budapest

- Host city: Budapest
- Country: Hungary
- Nations: 194
- Teams: 197
- Athletes: 975
- Dates: 11–22 September 2024
- Main venue: SYMA Sports and Conference Centre

Medalists

Team
- 1st place, gold medalist(s): India
- 2nd place, silver medalist(s): United States
- 3rd place, bronze medalist(s): Uzbekistan

Individual
- Board 1: (India) Gukesh Dommaraju
- Board 2: (Czech Republic) Thai Dai Van Nguyen
- Board 3: (India) Arjun Erigaisi
- Board 4: (Uzbekistan) Shamsiddin Vokhidov
- Reserve: (Germany) Frederik Svane

The Open event at the 45th Chess Olympiad was held from 11 to 22 September 2024. It was contested by a record number of 197 teams, representing 194 nations. Hungary, as host nation, fielded three teams. A total of 975 players participated in the Open event.

India won the gold medal in the Open event, which was their first overall win at the Chess Olympiads. The United States and Uzbekistan completed the podium by winning the silver and bronze medals, respectively. India's Gukesh Dommaraju achieved the highest performance rating of 3056 in the Open event after scoring 9 out of a possible 10 points (eight wins and two draws) on board one. Individual gold medals were also won by Thai Dai Van Nguyen of the Czech Republic with 7½ out of 10 and a performance rating of 2783, Arjun Erigaisi of India who had the highest individual score in the tournament of 10 out of 11 with a performance rating of 2968, Shamsiddin Vokhidov of Uzbekistan who scored 8 out of 10 with a performance rating of 2779, and Frederik Svane of Germany who played as a reserve and finished with 9 out of 10 and a performance rating of 2791.

== Competition format and calendar ==
The tournament was played in a Swiss system format. The time control for all games is 90 minutes for the first 40 moves, after which an additional 30 minutes were granted and increment of 30 seconds per move was applied from the first move. Players were permitted to offer a draw at any time. A total of 11 rounds were played, and all teams were paired in every round.

In each round, four players from each team faced four players from another team; teams were permitted one reserve player who could be substituted between rounds. The four games were played simultaneously on four boards with alternating colours, scoring 1 game point for a win and ½ game point for a draw. The scores from each game were summed together to determine which team would win the round. Winning a round was worth two match points, regardless of the game point margin, while drawing a round was worth one match point. Teams were ranked in a table based on match points. Tie-breakers for the table were i) the Sonneborn–Berger system; ii) total game points scored; iii) the sum of the match points of the opponents, excluding the lowest one.

The event took place from 10 to 23 September 2024. Tournament rounds started on 11 September and ended with the final round on 22 September. All rounds began at 15:00 CEST (UTC+2:00), except for the final round which began at 11:00 CEST (UTC+2:00). There was one rest day on 17 September, after the sixth round.

All dates are CEST (UTC+2:00)

1	Round	RD	Rest day

September	11th Wed	12th Thu	13st Fri	14th Sat	15th Sun	16th Mon	17th Tue	18th Wed	19th Thu	20th Fri	21st Sat	22nd Sun
Tournament round	1	2	3	4	5	6	RD	7	8	9	10	11

== Teams and players ==
The Open event was contested by a total of 975 players from 197 teams. It featured seven of the top ten players from the FIDE rating list published in September 2024. World no. 2 Hikaru Nakamura decided not to play for a second Olympiad in a row, and Alireza Firouzja did not play for France. United States, India and China were regarded as favourites with all three having an average rating above 2700 points. United States' team, consisting of Fabiano Caruana, Wesley So, Leinier Dominguez, Levon Aronian and Ray Robson as a reserve player, had the highest average rating of 2757. Nevertheless, the team, theoretically, was rendered weaker due to the absence of the top-ranked American player and second-highest rated player in the world Hikaru Nakamura. India, whose second team won bronze at the previous Olympiad that the country hosted, had the second highest rating of 2753 with two players from the bronze-winning team. The squad consisted of the challenger in the World Chess Championship 2024 Gukesh Dommaraju on board one followed by R Praggnanandhaa, Arjun Erigaisi, Vidit Gujrathi and Pentala Harikrishna. Former five-time World Champion Vishwanathan Anand decided to step aside for the younger generation and was the only of India's top-rated players who did not play. China had the third highest average rating of 2727 with reigning World Champion Ding Liren playing on top board followed by Wei Yi, Yu Yangyi, Bu Xiangzhi and Wang Yue.

The defending champions Uzbekistan were the fourth seeds. They were captained by former World Champion Vladimir Kramnik and fielded the same line-up that won the gold medal in 2022, which included Nodirbek Abdusattorov, Javokhir Sindarov, Nodirbek Yakubboev, Shamsiddin Vokhidov and Jakhongir Vakhidov. Former five-time World Champion and current world no. one Magnus Carlsen played on top board for the sixth-seeded team of Norway. Hungary's first team had the ninth highest pre-tournament average rating and were stronger for Richard Rapport, who returned to play for his native country three months before the Olympiad, and Peter Leko. Other strong contenders included Poland, Netherlands and England (strengthened by Nikita Vitiugov).

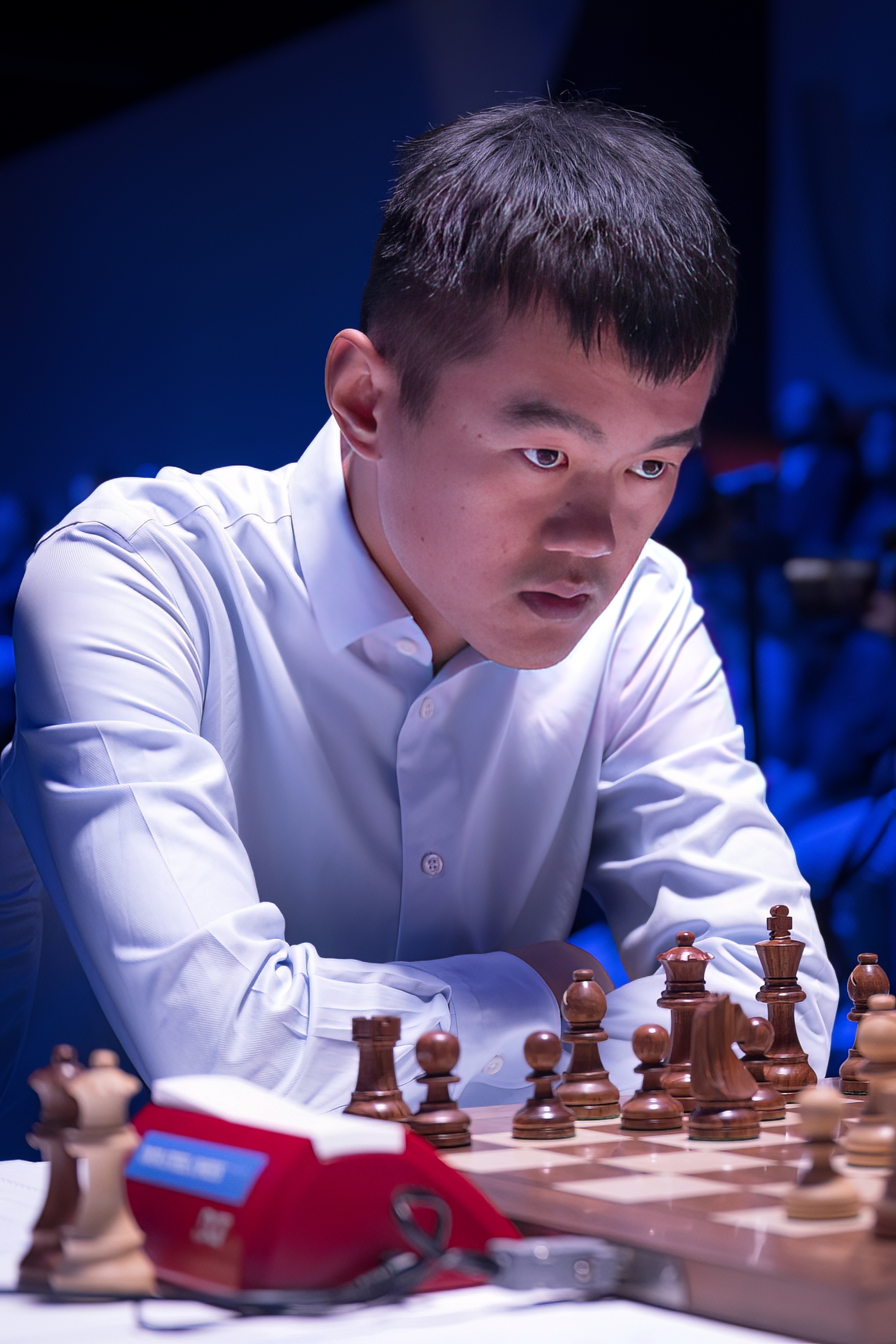
World Champion Ding Liren played on board one for China

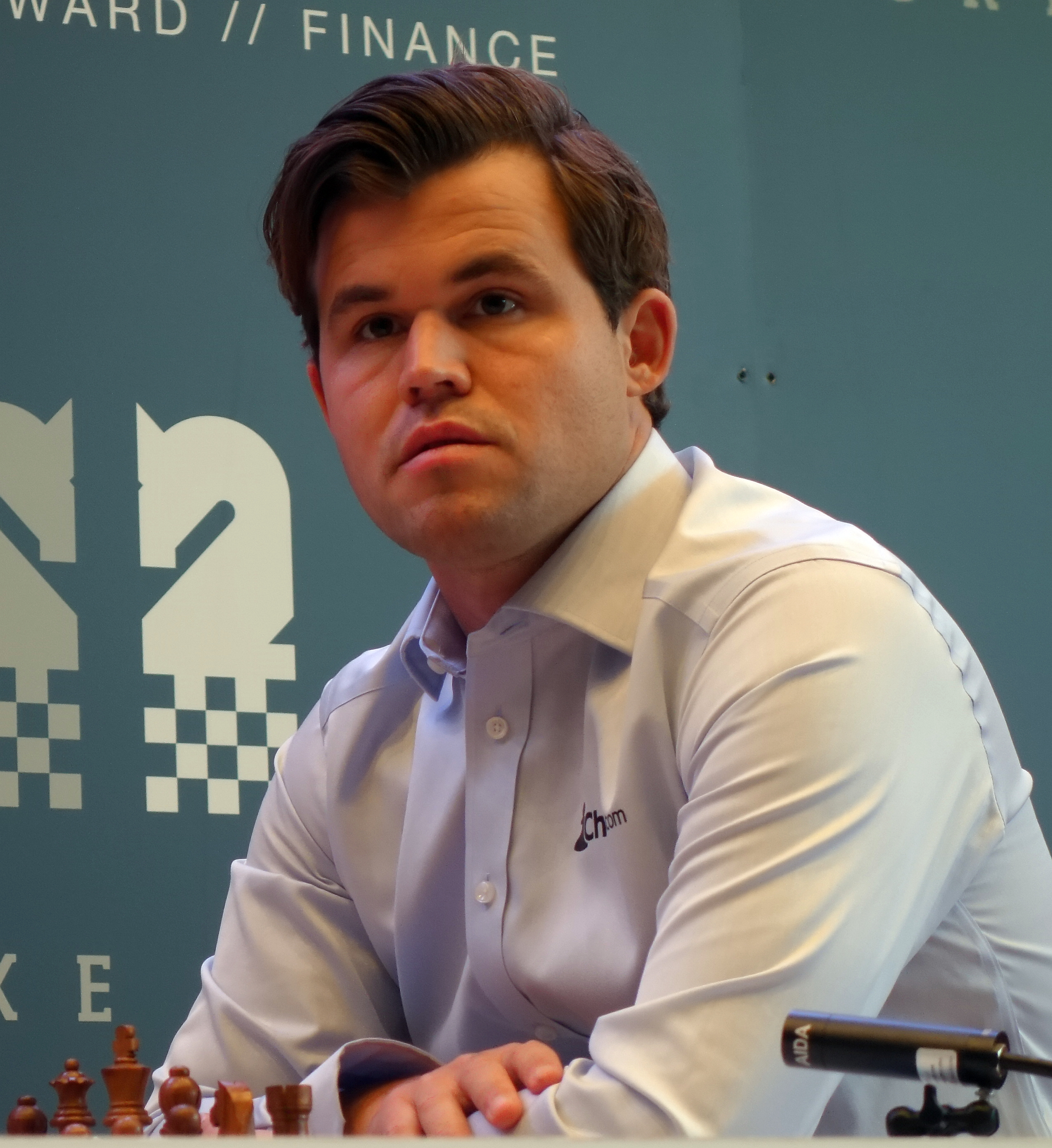
Former World Champion and world no. 1 Magnus Carlsen played on board one for Norway

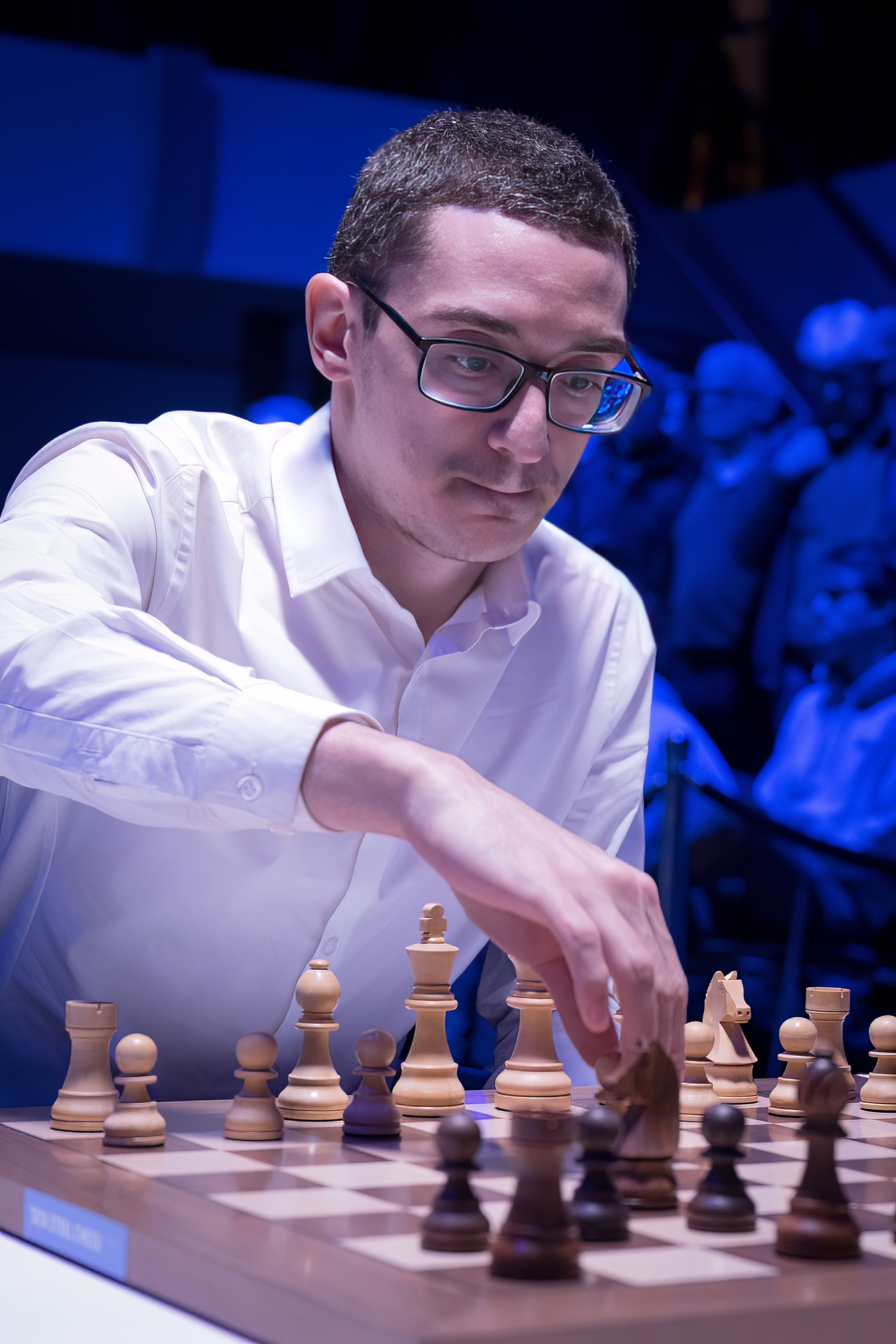
World no. 3 Fabiano Caruana played on board one for the United States

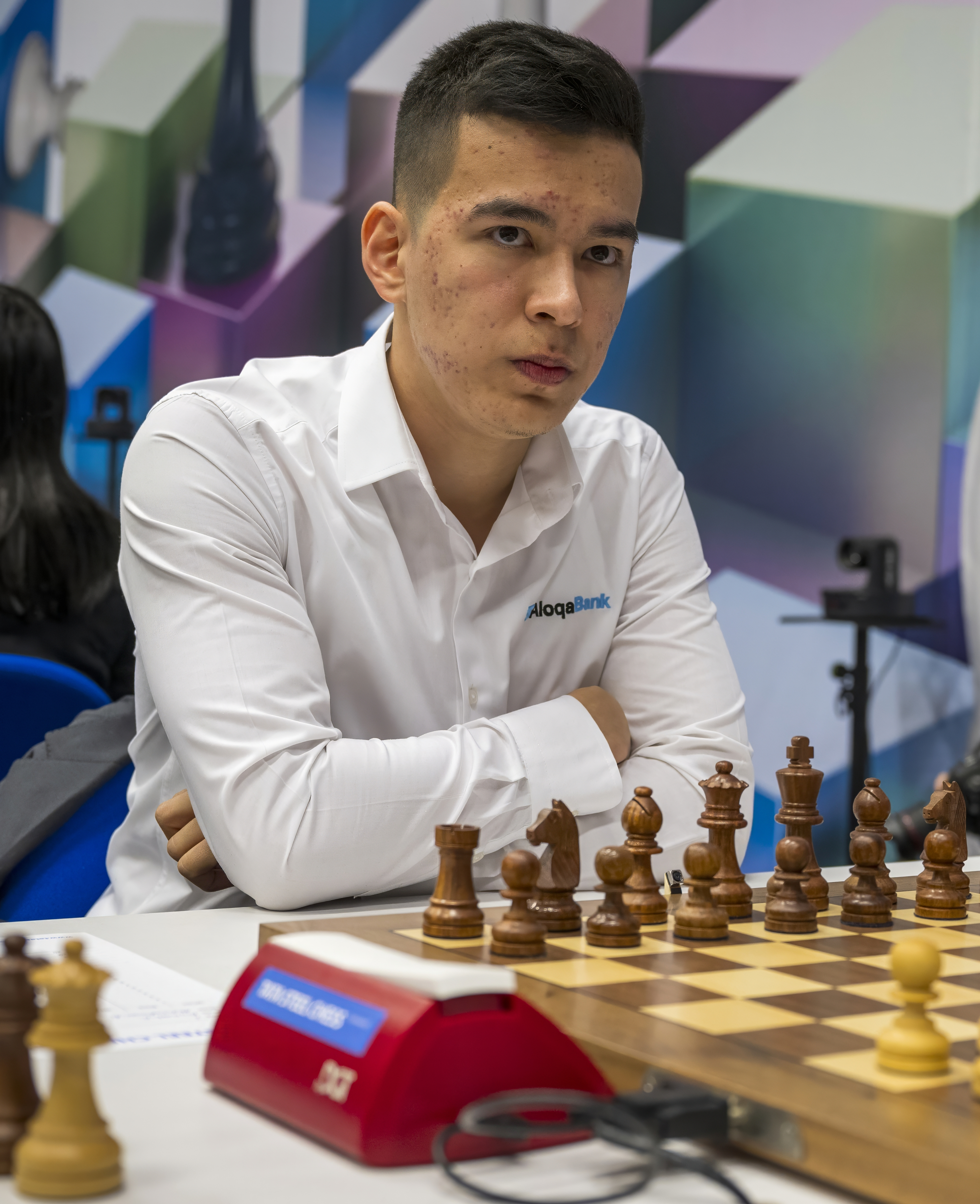
World no. 6 Nodirbek Abdusattorov played on board one for Uzbekistan

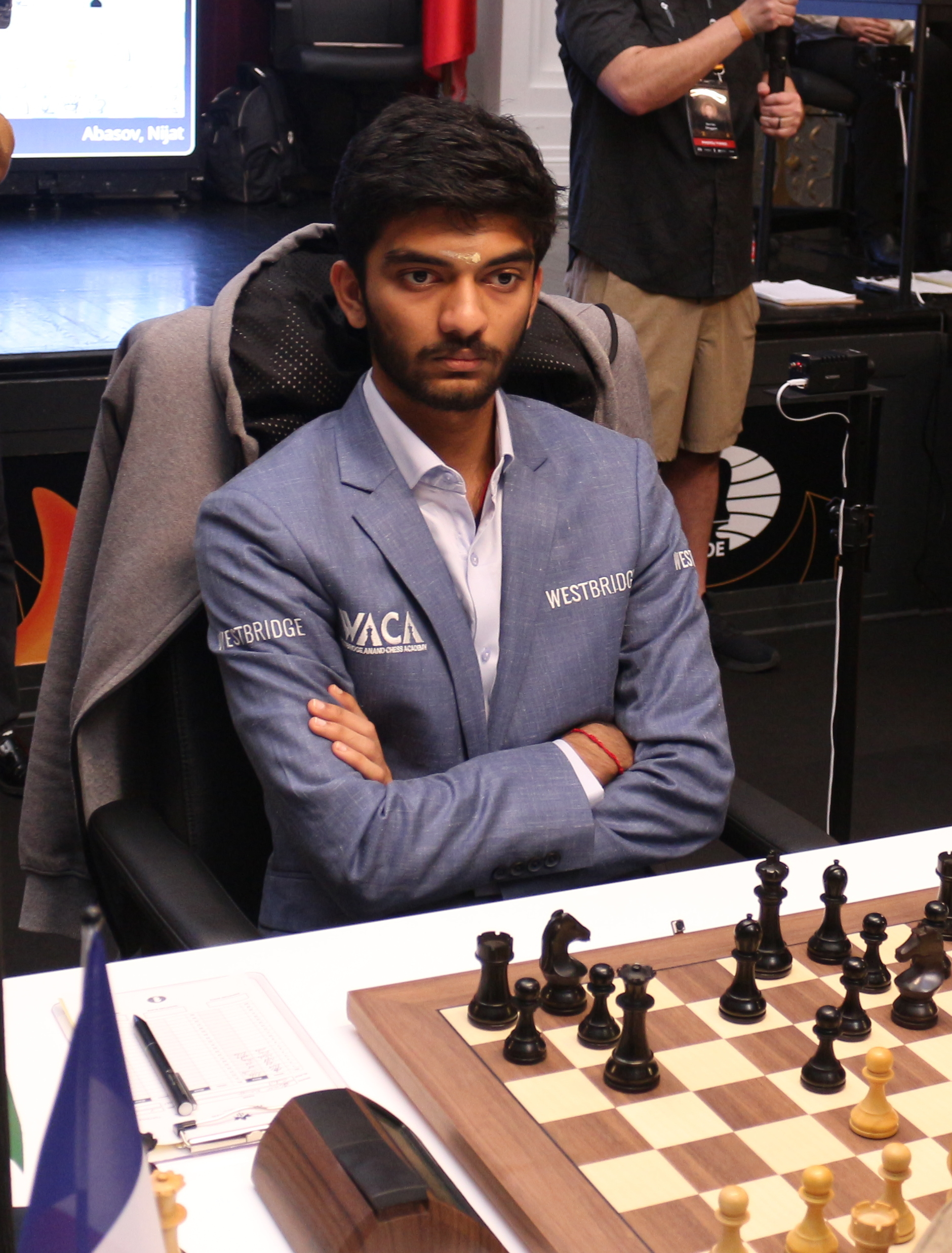
World Champion Challenger and world no. 7 Gukesh Dommaraju played on board one for India

== Rounds ==
=== Round 1 ===
Khwaira vs. Mamedyarov

Position: d8 black rook, e8 black rook, g8 black king, a7 black pawn, b7 black pawn, f7 black pawn, g7 black pawn, c6 black queen, f6 black knight, d5 white knight, b4 white bishop, c4 black knight, d4 white pawn, e4 white pawn, h4 black pawn, a3 white pawn, d3 white queen, e2 white rook, g2 white pawn, h2 white pawn, e1 white rook, g1 white king

This is the position after 24. Nd5 in which Black cannot play 24... Nxd5 because the queen is overloaded defending the knight on C4 and the rook on e8. Mamedyarov played 24... Nh5 and lost an exchange after 25. Rc2 Rc8 26. Ne7+.

The favourites proved their superiority in the first round, with a total of 56 teams scoring maximum wins. Of the top-seeded teams, India, China and Netherlands swept their opponents, whereas the United States, Uzbekistan and Norway conceded a half point. The Uzbek team had a challenging start with two dubious positions against their opponents from Trinidad and Tobago, in which Shamsiddin Vokhidov playing as White on board three squeezed out a win over Kevin Cupid, while Nodirbek Yakubboev narrowly escaped a lost position against Quinn Cabralis with the Black pieces on board two and settled for a draw. The top-seeded American team scored a 3½–½ victory against Panama thanks to wins by Leinier Domínguez, Levon Aronian and Ray Robson, while Wesley So drew his game on the top board with Panama's top player Roberto Carlos Sanchez Alvarez. Aronian played an overly optimistic line with the Black pieces in a Sicilian Defence and went into trouble after 13 moves, but found out a way to complicate things and went on to outplay his opponent in a double-rook endgame.

The biggest individual upset was perhaps Shakhriyar Mamedyarov's draw against his 17-year-old untitled opponent Anas Khwaira from Jordan. Mamedyarov playing as Black found himself in a difficult position with an exchange down after his opponent had made a great maneouvre (see diagram). White had a clear advantage in the ensuing position, but Anas Khwaira agreed to a draw after 49 moves. Arjun Erigaisi also played a troublesome position after he had sacrificed a piece, but eventually managed to get victorious out of the complications. Anish Giri wrung water from a stone to score a win in the longest game of the day. World no. 1 Magnus Carlsen, World Champion Ding Liren, Fabiano Caruana and Gukesh Dommaraju rested in this round.

=== Round 2 ===
Rodrigue-Lemieux vs. Christiansen

Position: a8 black king, g5 white king, h5 white queen, e4 black queen, g3 white pawn

In this position, Christiansen blundered with 63... Qe5+? (63... Qe7+! would draw according to the endgame tablebases). White went on to win the game after 103 moves.

In the second round, most of the top-seeded teams scored their second match victories, with India, Slovenia and Georgia being the only teams with individual wins on all boards after two rounds. Fabiano Caruana made his debut at the tournament and scored the first win in the match between the United States and Singapore, which ended in a 4–0 victory for the American team, despite concerns raised by Caruana about the games of his teammates. He commented:

At the moment, Levon is struggling. His game today is very dangerous for him, and we can’t really afford to lose a game. We’re playing a solid team, and they are probably going to make two draws with the white pieces.

Other players who appeared on the board for the first time include World Champion Ding Liren who drew his game on the top board against Chilean grandmaster Cristobal Henriquez Villagra, World Champion challenger Gukesh Dommaraju who developed a kingside attack and benefited from a mistake by the Icelandic grandmaster Vignir Vatnar Stefansson to score his first win, and Richard Rapport who won a 30-move game over Peruvian grandmaster Jorge Cori.

Uzbekistan scored a convincing 3½–½ victory over Egypt in which Javokhir Sindarov was held to a draw by Hamed Wafa. Netherlands narrowly defeated Belgium 2½–1½ with two draws on the lower boards. There were also a few upsets in this round as Norway, Czech Republic, Israel and Greece drew against Canada, Mongolia, Ireland and Tajikistan, respectively. Norway and Canada played a match with four decisive results—all wins for the players with the White pieces. The decision to rest Magnus Carlsen for one more round cost the Norwegian team a match point as his replacement on the top board Johan-Sebastian Christiansen suffered a loss to Shawn Rodrigue-Lemieux after blundering in a drawn queen endgame (see diagram). Later on, it was revealed that the real reason for Carlsen's absence was that he was playing a secret match against Hikaru Nakamura. Israel and Ireland also played a match with four decisive games. Maxim Rodshtein as Black on board one and Ilia Smirin as White on the fourth board scored wins for Israel, while Tarun Kanyamarala as Black on the second board and Tom O'Gorman as White on the third board won for Ireland.

=== Round 3 ===
Erigaisi vs. Prohaszka

Position: a8 black rook, h8 black king, b7 black pawn, e7 black queen, g7 black pawn, f6 black rook, g6 white rook, h6 black pawn, a5 black pawn, d5 black pawn, f5 white bishop, h4 black bishop, c3 white bishop, a2 black bishop, b2 white pawn, d2 white queen, f2 white pawn, c1 white king, g1 white rook

Erigaisi played 32. Qxh6+! gxh6 33. Rxh6+ Qh7 34 Rxh7#.

The four teams with the highest pre-tournament average rating—United States, India, China and Uzbekistan—scored their third victories. United States convincingly defeated Bulgaria 3½–½ thanks to the wins by Fabiano Caruana, Wesley So and Levon Aronian. Caruana played a long game against Ivan Cheparinov, which finally managed to convert when both players were playing on the incremental 30 seconds. India dropped the first half point in the tournament after Vidit Gujrathi had drawn, but they beat Hungary B thanks to victories scored by Gukesh Dommaraju, R Praggnanandhaa and Arjun Erigaisi. Erigaisi's win over Péter Prohászka with a queen sacrifice and checkmate (see diagram) was his third out of three games played. China beat Slovenia 3–1 even though Ding Liren failed to score a win again and drew against Vladimir Fedoseev, while Uzbekistan snatched a 3½–½ victory over Croatia.

However, there are several upsets in this round, with two of the top favourites suffering losses. Netherlands as fifth seeds lost to Italy 3–1 in a match wherein Lorenzo Lodici, Francesco Sonis and Sabino Brunello scored full points against Anish Giri, Max Warmerdam and Erwin l'Ami, respectively. Jorden Van Foreest won the only game for the Dutch team by defeating Luca Moroni. The seventh-seeded German team was narrowly beaten by Lithuania after Alexander Donchenko blundered a winning position against Valery Kazakouski. In the other matches involving strong teams with surprising results, France and Romania were defeated with a 2½–1½ scoreline by Montenegro and Sweden, respectively; England played a 2–2 tie with Denmark and so did Iran with Georgia.

Magnus Carlsen played his first game in the tournament and contributed to Norway's 3½–½ victory over Colombia by defeating Roberto Garcia Pantoja with the Black pieces. He arrived ten minutes late as he had been travelling by bike in the rain, rushing to the venue and getting confused about the entrance. Following the game, he commented:

It was a bit of a mess. I am in a different hotel from the others, so they were supposed to pick me up. Then, they suddenly told me that traffic was horrible and they would be at my hotel at five to three. At that point, I thought I couldn’t get there in time by car, so I decided biking might be faster.

=== Round 4 ===
Ivanchuk vs. So

Position: d8 white rook, f7 black pawn, e6 black pawn, g6 black pawn, h6 black king, a5 black pawn, b5 white rook, h4 white pawn, a3 black rook, f3 white knight, g3 white king, a2 black rook

This is the position in which Black made the decisive mistake by playing 44... Re2?, after which the game continued with 45. Rb7 Re5 46. Rxf7 g5 47. h5 Kxh5 48. Rf6 and So resigned.

A total of eight teams scored their fourth match victory in this round. Ukraine and Vietnam produced the main upsets with their victories over the top-seeded team of the United States and the defending champions from Uzbekistan, respectively. Ukraine narrowly defeated the United States 2½–1½. Fabiano Caruana scored the first win in the match after beating Andrei Volokitin on board one, while Leinier Domínguez and Ruslan Ponomariov drew on board three. Wesley So had a better position as Black against Vasyl Ivanchuk on board two, but blundered on the 44th move to enable his opponent create a mating net (see diagram). On the fourth board, Anton Korobov gained an early advantage after Ray Robson pushed his d-pawn instead of castling on move 13. Korobov went on two exchanges up and gave one back to score a win, which proved decisive for the outcome in the match. Vietnam scored a 3–1 victory against Uzbekistan thanks to wins by Lê Tuấn Minh and Nguyễn Ngọc Trường Sơn over Javokhir Sindarov and Nodirbek Yakubboev, respectively. The games between Lê Quang Liêm and Nodirbek Abdusattorov as well as Trần Tuấn Minh and Jakhongir Vakhidov ended in a draw.

The other favourites did not have problems. India scored a big 3½–½ victory against Serbia in a match wherein Arjun Erigaisi moved to 4 wins out of 4 games. The Indian team has conceded only two draws after four rounds and have a cumulative score of 15 out of 16 from the individual boards. China edged out Armenia 2½–1½ thanks to Yu Yangyi's win against Gabriel Sargissian on board three, whereas Ding Liren drew another game on the top board. In the other matches, host nation Hungary and Poland narrowly defeated Italy and Lithuania, respectively, with a 2½–1½ scoreline, Azerbaijan beat Montenegro 3–1 and Spain conceded only one draw in their 3½–½ victory over Sweden. England managed to tie with Georgia thanks to David Howell's 113-move win against Nikolozi Kacharava, which cancelled Baadur Jobava's win over Luke McShane earlier in the match.

=== Round 5 ===
Ivanchuk vs. Rapport

Position: f8 black rook, g8 black king, a7 black pawn, b7 black pawn, f7 black pawn, h7 black pawn, a6 black knight, e6 black pawn, f6 white queen, g6 black pawn, e5 white king, a4 white pawn, d4 white rook, c3 white pawn, e3 white pawn, e2 black queen, f2 white pawn, g2 white pawn, h2 white pawn, h1 white rook

This is the position after White's 24. Rd4 in which Rapport continued with 24... Nb8!, and Ivanchuk resigned after 25.Rd6 Qc4 26.Qf4 because 26... f6+ wins the queen.

The only teams that extended their winning streak and scored the fifth match victories are the pre-tournament favourites India, China and Hungary as well as Vietnam. India defeated Azerbaijan 3–1 with two wins and two draws. Gukesh Dommaraju and Arjun Erigaisi won their games against Aydin Suleymanli and Rauf Mamedov, respectively. It was Erigaisi's fifth win in the tournament. Vidit Gujrathi was close to winning against Shakhriyar Mamedyarov but missed his chance. China edged out Spain 2½–1½ with three draws, including the game between Alexei Shirov and Ding Liren in which the World Champion escaped from a potentially dangerous position as Black, and one win scored by Wei Yi against David Antón Guijarro on the second board. Hungary beat Ukraine with the same scoreline as China in a match with only one win scored by Richard Rapport over Vasyl Ivanchuk with the Black pieces. Ivanchuk involuntarily marched with his king to the centre and the game entered wild complications that put him in trouble (see diagram).

Vietnam scored a minimal 2½–1½ victory over Poland thanks to the wins by Nguyễn Ngọc Trường Sơn and Lê Tuấn Minh over Radosław Wojtaszek and Mateusz Bartel, respectively. Norway defeated Turkey 3–1 with wins on the lower boards by Aryan Tari and Frode Urkedal, whereas the games on the first two boards ended in a draw. Mustafa Yılmaz had a big advantage in the middlegame against Magnus Carlsen after bringing him into complications, but his edge fully disappeared after a couple of inaccurate moves. England defeated Australia 2½–1½ with wins by Michael Adams and Gawain Jones, but an interesting moment happened in David Howell's loss to Bobby Cheng in which the Australian had to underpromote to a knight in order to avoid stalemate. In the other matches, defending champions Uzbekistan bounced back and convincingly defeated Moldova 3½–½, while the top-seeded United States beat Argentina 3–1.

=== Round 6 ===
Ding vs. Liêm

Position: e8 white rook, e7 black rook, d6 black pawn, e6 black king, f6 black pawn, f2 white pawn, g2 white king

In this position, Ding blundered with 44. Ra8? (44. Rd8! was still holding). Liêm continued with 44... d5! and won after 62 moves.

India remained the only perfect score after six rounds after achieving a 3–1 victory over Hungary. Arjun Erigaisi extended his winning streak to 6 out of 6 games following his victory against Sanan Sjugirov in a game wherein he sacrificed a pawn in the opening to gain big advantage that he managed to convert with precise play in the middlegame and endgame. Vidit Gujrathi scored the second triumph in the match, while the other games ended peacefully. R Praggnanandhaa was the only Indian player under pressure in the match, but he finally held a draw against Peter Leko. China and Vietnam exchanged one win per side to split the points. Wang Yue won a full point for the Chinese team with his victory over Trần Tuấn Minh on the lowest board, whereas Lê Quang Liêm levelled the score after beating Ding Liren. The World Champion was a pawn down in a drawn endgame, but committed a decisive mistake that costed his team the match victory (see diagram). Following the game, Liêm commented:

This is the first time that after the first half of the tournament, we are among the leaders,” commented Liem on the official broadcast... I am very happy with the result and proud of my teammates. We are playing fantastically this time. Coming into this tournament, we had no expectations. We were initially ranked #21. We have never been this close to the medals before. We will enjoy the games and see what happens.

Iran saw Norway off in a close match with only one victory by Pouya Idani over Frode Urkedal on the fourth board. Magnus Carlsen gained a significant space advantage in the middlegame of his game in the Caro–Kann Defence against Parham Maghsoodloo, but the Iranian got a dynamic counterplay to equalise the position and draw in 87 moves. Uzbekistan played a tough match against Israel in which Javokhir Sindarov blundered and lost to Tamir Nabaty, but the Uzbek team snatched the match victory thanks to wins by Nodirbek Abdusattorov and Nodirbek Yakubboev. In the other matches, Romania and the United States tied with four draws. Austria held Poland to a draw thanks to Valentin Dragnev saving lost position against Jan-Krzysztof Duda with a queen sacrifice. Lithuania and Georgia upset Azerbaijan and Spain, respectively, with 2½–1½ victories.

=== Round 7 ===
Gukesh vs. Wei

Position: d8 black king, f6 white pawn, a5 black pawn, e5 white knight, a4 white pawn, e4 white knight, h4 black pawn, d3 white king, h1 black rook

This is the position in which Wei committed the crucial mistake by playing 71... h3 (71... Rd1+! was the only move that would hold the draw). Gukesh won the game after 80 moves.

The central match of the seventh round was the encounter between India and China in which many expected to see a clash between the World Champion Ding Liren and the challenger in the World Chess Championship Gukesh Dommaraju on the top board. However, a game between the two did not happen as the Chinese team decided to rest Ding in this round. India scored a narrow 2½–1½ victory thanks to the win scored by Gukesh over Wei Yi on board one, while the games on all other boards were drawn. It seemed like India's winning streak would come to an end after the three draws in the match and Wei's tenacious defence against Gukesh, but the Indian continued to push in the endgame with two knights against a rook and finally squeezed out a full point (see diagram). After the game, Gukesh commented:

I thought I’ll press this forever and see what happens... I couldn’t lose it, so there was no pressure on me.

Arjun Erigaisi's perfect score of six consecutive wins came to an end after he had made his first draw in the tournament in a game with opposite-sides castling that emerged from a Nimzowitsch Attack variation in the Petrov's Defence.

Iran defeated Vietnam 2½–1½ in a match with three draws and the only win scored by Pouya Idani on the lowest board. Hungary edged out Lithuania with the same scoreline as Iran in a match with similar developments wherein Peter Leko was the only one to achieve full point on board two. Tomas Laurušas could have saved the match for Lithuania had he defeated Benjamin Gledura, but he missed his last chance in the game on move 40 and ended up in a losing position that he eventually drew. In the other matches, Serbia beat the Netherlands 3–1 with wins by Aleksandar Inđić and Velimir Ivić; Uzbekistan won their match against Ukraine with the same scoreline thanks to wins by Nodirbek Abdusattorov and Javokhir Sindarov on the first two boards, while Armenia edged out England because of Haik M. Martirosyan's win against Nikita Vitiugov on the first board.

=== Round 8 ===
Maghsoodloo vs. Gukesh

Position: d8 black rook, f8 black rook, g8 black king, g7 black knight, b6 white rook, d6 white knight, e6 black queen, h6 black pawn, e5 black knight, f5 black pawn, f4 white queen, g3 white pawn, h3 white pawn, a2 white pawn, b2 white pawn, f2 white pawn, g2 white king, d1 white rook

In this position, White blundered by playing 29. Nc4?? (29. b3, 29. a4 or 29. Rd2 were all good moves). Maghsoodloo resigned after 34 moves.

The sole leader after seven rounds India snatched the eighth consecutive match victory by outplaying Iran 3½–½ with wins scored by Gukesh Dommaraju, Arjun Erigaisi and Vidit Gujrathi. Arjun was the first to achieve a full point against Bardiya Daneshvar with the Black pieces after the Iranian made a mistake with his bishop on move 20 that enabled an easy attack by the Indian. On the top board, Parham Maghsoodloo misplayed the Tarrasch Variation in Queen's Gambit Declined as White to reach a worse position out of the opening. Nevertheless, the Iranian went back into the game with three pawns for a piece before blundering a knight move that costed him the game (see diagram). Vidit launched a compelling attack in the Fischer-Sozin Variation of Sicilian Defence, Najdorf Variation that brought him a win over Pouya Idani. R Praggnanandhaa and Amin Tabatabaei drew their game in a heavy-piece endgame.

Hungary and Uzbekistan stayed in the race behind the perfect-scoring Indian team with a two-point deficit after scoring narrow 2½–1½ victories in their matches against Armenia and Serbia, respectively. In both matches, a single win was decisive. Benjamin Gledura's win over Robert Hovhannisyan secured the match victory for Hungary, while Nodirbek Abdusattorov's excellent endgame technique against Alexandr Predke proved crucial for Uzbekistan. In the other matches involving pre-tournament favourites, the United States minimally defeated France thanks to Levon Aronian's early win against Maxime Lagarde; China beat Romania with the same scoreline as the United States with a single victory scored by Yu Yangyi over Kirill Shevchenko in a rook endgame; and Norway tied with Vietnam in a match wherein Magnus Carlsen scored a full point with the Black pieces against Lê Quang Liêm.

=== Round 9 ===
Erigaisi vs. Vokhidov

Position: e8 black knight, f8 black king, a7 black pawn, c7 black rook, e7 black queen, f7 black pawn, g7 black pawn, b6 black pawn, h6 black pawn, d5 white bishop, c4 white pawn, f4 white queen, h4 white pawn, b3 white pawn, f3 white rook, a2 white pawn, f2 white pawn, g2 white king

This is the position after Vokhidov blundered in the time trouble with 37... Ne8??. Erigaisi could have won had he found 38. Bxf7!, but he missed the opportunity and played 38. Re3?. The game was drawn after 70 moves.

The main match of the ninth round was the clash between the perfect-scoring team of India and defending champions Uzbekistan, which ended in a 2–2 tie with draws on all boards. On board one, Nodirbek Abdusattorov seemed ready for a fight in his game against Gukesh Dommaraju and opted for the Sicilian Defence, Najdorf Variation, but the Indian went for the quieter variation with 6. a4 and game was drawn after 32 moves. R Praggnanandhaa was in trouble as Black during the game that opened with the French Defence against Javokhir Sindarov on board two, but he eventually managed to find a way out and hold the position. Arjun Erigaisi had an opening advantage in the Berlin Defence against Shamsiddin Vokhidov, which he let go away on the 24th move. However, the Indian got a clear winning chance three moves before the time control when both players had under two minutes on the clock, but he did not find the winning continuation and missed the opportunity (see diagram). After the match, Uzbekistan's captain Vladimir Kramnik commented that he expected more than a draw from the games. He said:

I think we were very close to winning the match, unfortunately... but I'm proud of my guys. They really showed that they can play real chess.

The United States and China joined Uzbekistan in the tie for the second place with a two-point deficit after scoring narrow 2½–1½ victories with three draws and one decisive game. The United States triumphed over the host nation Hungary thanks to Leinier Dominguez’s win against Sanan Sjugirov. China defeated Iran because of Wei Yi's win over Amin Tabatabaei. Ding Liren could have made the victory more convincing had he converted his winning advantage against Parham Maghsoodloo, but he failed to do so and the game was drawn. Slovenia cruised to a 3–1 victory over Norway with wins on the top two boards scored by Vladimir Fedoseev and Anton Demchenko. Fedoseev scored his fourth win in a row and inflicted the first loss on former World Champion Magnus Carlsen. Armenia minimally defeated Germany in a match wherein Gabriel Sargissian was the only one to score a full point in his game with Matthias Blübaum.

=== Round 10 ===
Abdusattorov vs. Ding

Position: h8 black rook, e7 black king, f7 black pawn, h7 black pawn, b6 white pawn, e6 black pawn, d5 black pawn, g5 white pawn, a4 black knight, e3 white pawn, f3 white pawn, g3 white pawn, b2 black pawn, d2 white knight, g2 white king, h1 white rook

In this position, Ding played 28... Na4?? and blundered the passed b-pawn to a simple rook manoeuvre (28... Rc8! was winning). The game was drawn after 34 moves.

The match that attracted central attention in the penultimate round was played between the leader India and the pre-tournament top-seeds the United States, which the Indian team narrowly won 2½–1½ thanks to victories scored by Gukesh Dommaraju and Arjun Erigaisi. Nevertheless, the first player who achieved a full point was Wesley So with his win over R Praggnanandhaa, inflicting India's first loss on an individual board in the tournament. By the end of this game, Gukesh and Erigaisi were already winning their games against Fabiano Caruana and Lenier Dominguez, respectively. Gukesh defeated Caruana for a second Olympiad in a row after spotting a blunder on the 34th move and reacting correctly with only 21 seconds on the clock. In the last game of the match, Vidit Gujrathi secured a draw against Levon Aronian with the Black pieces.

China edged out Uzbekistan 2½–1½ because of wins by Yu Yangyi over Javokhir Sindarov and Wei Yi against Nodirbek Yakubboev. Shamsiddin Vokhidov scored the only win for Uzbekistan by defeating Wang Yue. Nodirbek Abdusattorov misplayed the opening against Ding Liren, and it seemed like the World Champion would score a big win for his team. However, he blundered his passed pawn and the game was quickly drawn (see diagram). After winning their match against the sixth seeds of Norway in the previous round, Slovenia minimally defeated the fifth-seeded team of the Netherlands with the only win in the match achieved by Matej Šebenik against Benjamin Bok. This victory put the Slovenian team with 16 match points alone in the third place with one round to go. In the other matches, host nation Hungary and Serbia drew with indecisive games on all boards, while the matches between Ukraine and Armenia as well as Iran and Romania were also tied.

=== Round 11 ===
India sealed the gold medal in the tournament with a convincing 3½–½ victory against Slovenia in the final round thanks to the wins scored by Gukesh Dommaraju, Arjun Erigaisi and R Praggnanandhaa. After Gukesh defeated Fedoseev, he commented that he was not interested about his individual result but about whatever it takes for India to win the gold. Gukesh ended the tournament with 9 out of 10 to win the individual gold medal on board one, while Erigaisi finished with 10 out of 11 to win the gold medal on board three.

The race for the other medals involved four teams that finished with 17 match points. The United States narrowly defeated China 2½–1½ with the only win in the match scored by Wesley So against Wei Yi, and Uzbekistan beat France with the same scoreline because of Shamsiddin Vokhidov's win over Maxime Lagarde. As a result of this win, Vokhidov won the individual gold medal on board four, after narrowly outscoring Levon Aronian who won the silver. Serbia scored a big 3½–½ victory over Ukraine, and Armenia minimally defeated Iran. At the end, the United States and Uzbekistan had better tie-breakers to claim the silver and bronze medals, respectively.

== Final standings ==
India won the gold medal in the Open event with a total of 21 out of 22 possible match points, which broke the previous record set by the United States and Ukraine of 20 out of 22 points in 2016. They were the only unbeaten team in the tournament, having scored ten wins and one draw, and scored four match points more than the rest of the field. It was India's first overall win at the Chess Olympiad. On the road to the gold medal, they defeated the United States, Hungary and China, and were held to a draw only by Uzbekistan in the ninth round. A group of five teams finished with 17 match points (eight wins, one draw and two losses), but the pre-tournament first-seeded team of the United States and defending champions Uzbekistan achieved better tie-breakers and won the silver and bronze medals, respectively. Despite the lacklustre performance from World Champion Ding Liren, who did not win a single game in the tournament, the Chinese team was in the race for the gold until the final round and ended in fourth place due to their last-round loss to the US team. Serbia came fifth and Armenia sixth after scoring 17 match points as well. Slovenia had a strong performance with 16 match points (eighth wins and three losses). For the first time in the history of Chess Olympiads, no European team won a medal in the Open event.

The challenger in the World Chess Championship 2024 Gukesh Dommaraju of India achieved the highest performance rating of 3056 in the Open event after scoring 9 out of a possible 10 points (eight wins and two draws) on board one. Individual gold medals were also won by Thai Dai Van Nguyen of the Czech Republic with 7½ out of 10 and a performance rating of 2783, Arjun Erigaisi of India who had the highest individual score in the tournament of 10 out of 11 with a performance rating of 2968, Shamsiddin Vokhidov of Uzbekistan who scored 8 out of 10 with a performance rating of 2779, and Frederik Svane of Germany who played as a reserve player and finished with 9 out of 10 and a performance rating of 2791. Gukesh's win against China's Wei Yi in the seventh round was awarded the Olympiad Best Game prize. Erigaisi's performance earned him the third place on the FIDE rankings. Magnus Carlsen won the bronze medal on board one, leaving his ambition of eliminating one of the few gaps in his career unfulfilled.

English chess journalist Leonard Barden described India's performance as "seminal moment in chess history", and compared it to the US vs. USSR radio chess match 1945 that the Soviet Union won 15½–4½ to mark the beginning of their chess dominance. He added that Gukesh and Erigaisi could be Mikhail Botvinnik and Vasily Smyslov or Anatoly Karpov and Garry Kasparov of the 2020s and 2030s. Barden mentioned Vishwanathan Anand as inspiration of India's success as he had mentored several of the players. India's prime minister Narendra Modi received the Indian teams at his residence to congratulate for their achievements, and All India Chess Federation announced cash awards for the members of the winning teams.

Open event
#	Country	Players	Average rating	MP	dSB^{†}
1st place, gold medalist(s)	India	Gukesh, Praggnanandhaa, Erigaisi, Vidit, Harikrishna	2753	21	
2nd place, silver medalist(s)	United States	Caruana, So, Domínguez, Aronian, Robson	2757	17	395.0
3rd place, bronze medalist(s)	Uzbekistan	Abdusattorov, Yakubboev, Sindarov, Vokhidov, Vakhidov	2690	17	387.0
4	China	Ding Liren, Wei Yi, Yu Yangyi, Bu Xiangzhi, Wang Yue	2724	17	379.5
5	Serbia	Predke, Sarana, Inđić, Markuš, Ivić	2649	17	360.5
6	Armenia	Martirosyan, Sargsyan, Sargissian, Hovhannisyan, Grigoryan	2645	17	335.0
7	Germany	Keymer, Kollars, Blübaum, Donchenko, Svane	2667	16	354.5
8	Azerbaijan	Suleymanli, Abasov, Mamedov, Mamedyarov, Muradli	2657	16	351.0
9	Slovenia	Fedoseev, Demchenko, Šubelj, Šebenik, Lavrenčič	2576	16	341.5
10	Spain	Shirov, Antón Guijarro, Vallejo Pons, Pichot, Santos Latasa	2654	16	339.0

Notes

- Average ratings calculated by chess-results.com based on September 2024 FIDE ratings.
- ^† The Sonneborn–Berger score is a tie-breaking criterion used to rank teams with equal match points.

All board prizes were given out according to performance ratings for players who played at least eight games at the tournament. The winners of the gold medal on each board are listed in turn:

- Board 1: (India) Gukesh Dommaraju 3056
- Board 2: (Czech Republic) Thai Dai Van Nguyen 2783
- Board 3: (India) Arjun Erigaisi 2968
- Board 4: (Uzbekistan) Shamsiddin Vokhidov 2779
- Reserve: (Germany) Frederik Svane 2791

== See also ==
- Women's event at the 45th Chess Olympiad
