= 45th Chess Olympiad =

2024 chess tournament in Budapest, Hungary

- Logo of the 45th Chess Olympiad
- Host city: Budapest
- Country: Hungary
- Nations: 194 (Open); 180 (Women)
- Teams: 197 (Open); 183 (Women)
- Athletes: 1,884 (975 in Open and 909 in Women's event)
- Dates: 10–22 September 2024
- Opened by: Arkady Dvorkovich
- Torch lighter: Judit Polgár
- Main venue: SYMA Sports and Conference Centre

Medalists

Team (Open)
- 1st place, gold medalist(s): India
- 2nd place, silver medalist(s): United States
- 3rd place, bronze medalist(s): Uzbekistan

Team (Women)
- 1st place, gold medalist(s): India
- 2nd place, silver medalist(s): Kazakhstan
- 3rd place, bronze medalist(s): United States

Individual (Open)
- Board 1: (India) Gukesh Dommaraju
- Board 2: (Czech Republic) Thai Dai Van Nguyen
- Board 3: (India) Arjun Erigaisi
- Board 4: (Uzbekistan) Shamsiddin Vokhidov
- Reserve: (Germany) Frederik Svane

Individual (Women)
- Board 1: (China) Zhu Jiner
- Board 2: (United States) Carissa Yip
- Board 3: (India) Divya Deshmukh
- Board 4: (India) Vantika Agrawal
- Reserve: (Israel) Dana Kochavi

Gaprindashvili Trophy
- India

The 45th Chess Olympiad (Hungarian: 45. sakkolimpiát) was an international team chess event organised by the International Chess Federation (FIDE) in Budapest, Hungary, from 10 to 22 September 2024. It consisted of two main tournaments—an Open event, enabling participation of players from all genders, and a Women's event, enabling participation of female players only—as well as several events to promote chess.

The total number of participants was 1,884: 975 in the Open and 909 in the Women's event. The number of registered teams was 197 from 194 nations in the Open section and 183 from 180 nations in the Women's section. Both sections set team participation records despite the absence of Russia and Belarus due to their involvement in the Russian invasion of Ukraine. This was the first Chess Olympiad in which teams of refugees participated due to efforts made through FIDE's initiative for refugees "Chess for Protection". The main venue of the Chess Olympiad was the SYMA Sports and Conference Centre. The Chief Arbiter of the event was International Arbiter Ivan Syrovy from Slovakia.

A total of 11 rounds were played in both the Open and Women's events, and each featured four players from one team facing four players from another team. India won the gold medal in both the Open and Women's events, which were the country's first overall victories at the Chess Olympiad, after they had previously won the bronze medal in the Open and Women's events in 2022 and the Open event in 2014. It was the first time since 2018 that the same nation won the titles in both events, and India became the third nation to do so after the former Soviet Union and China. In the Open event, the Indian team set a new record by scoring 21 out of 22 possible match points, being the only unbeaten team in the tournament with four match points more than the rest of the field. The United States won silver and Uzbekistan won bronze in the Open event, while Kazakhstan and the United States completed the podium in the Women's event. For the first time in a Chess Olympiad, no European team won a medal in either the Open or the Women's event. Indian player on board one Gukesh Dommaraju had the highest performance for an individual player in the Open event with a performance rating of 3056 (he scored 9 out of 10 points). Israeli player Dana Kochavi had the highest individual performance in the Women's event with a performance rating of 2676 (she scored a perfect 8 of a possible 8 points). Overall, India won the Gabrindashvili Trophy for the best combined team ranking, and Indian players won four gold medals on individual boards in both events.

The 95th FIDE Congress also took place during the Olympiad, at which FIDE's General Assembly upheld the ban on Russian and Belarusian players by rejecting the Kyrgyz Chess Federation's proposal to restore the full membership of their respective chess federations.

== Background ==
The Chess Olympiad is a biennial chess tournament in which teams representing nations compete in an Olympic-style event. The first unofficial edition, labelled as the "Chess Olympic Games", was held in Paris in 1924, and coincided with the Summer Olympic Games that took place in the city in the same year. Despite the fact that the event was not officially part of the Olympic Games and the winners were not awarded official Olympic medals, the rules of the Olympic Games applied. The organisers of the Summer Olympics defined chess as a sport, (Note: Chess was officially recognised as a sport by the International Olympic Committee in 1999. At the 2000 Summer Olympics, a two-game exhibition match between grandmasters Vishwanathan Anand and Alexey Shirov took place, but no Olympic medals were awarded.) but demanded that only amateurs be allowed to participate, which posed a problem because it was difficult to draw a line between amateurs and professionals. The first official edition of the Chess Olympiad was held in London in 1927. Up until 1950 the tournament was organised at irregular intervals. From then on it has been held once every two years. The first Women's Chess Olympiad took place in Emmen, Netherlands in 1957; since 1976, the Women's tournament has been held simultaneously with an Open tournament (Note: The Open tournament enables participation of players from all genders.) at the Chess Olympiads. The former Soviet Union has historically been the most successful nation with 18 gold medals won.

The bidding process for organising both the 45th Chess Olympiad and the coinciding FIDE Congress was opened in November 2019. Each city interested in hosting the event had to submit their bid to FIDE by 1 May 2020. The bids were to guarantee that all necessary provisions in accordance with the Olympiad Regulations of the FIDE Handbook would be covered by the organiser, including articles 4.1, 4.2 and 4.3 pertaining to the organising committee, finances, and provision of amenities and stipends, respectively. Budapest submitted the only bid to host the Chess Olympiad, which was approved by the FIDE General Assembly in December 2020. Political authorities, chess legends, and prominent members of the Hungarian Olympic movement and the sports administration expressed their unconditional support for the event. It was the first Chess Olympiad that took place in Hungary since Budapest hosted the 2nd unofficial Chess Olympiad in 1926.

The 45th Chess Olympiad was originally scheduled to take place in Minsk in 2022, but FIDE decided to move it from there and reopen the bid after the Belarusian organisers failed to accomplish their organisational and financial duties. After failing to find an alternative host for the event in 2022, FIDE decided to reschedule the 44th Chess Olympiad from 2021 to 2022, and the event planned for 2024 in Budapest became the 45th Chess Olympiad instead of the 46th.

== Preparations ==
The provisional total budget for the Chess Olympiad was €16.6 million, including €9 million for event services and operations as well as the hosting fee. In June 2021, FIDE President Arkady Dvorkovich, together with the president of the Hungarian Chess Federation László Szabó and the executive director of the National Sports Agency of Hungary Attila Mihok, signed the contract in Budapest. The organisers of the event intended to make it an innovative Olympiad by introducing new technologies, such as a 5G high-speed wireless network, a real-time visual broadcast, holograms and newly invented "sensitive" chess boards for the visually impaired. It was announced to be a "green" Olympiad with the possibility of transfers between the venues and the hotels using bicycles and electric vehicles, as well as avoiding the use of paper and plastic. The Government of Hungary supported the event. Robert Kapas was the tournament director, and Slovakia's International Arbiter Ivan Syrovy was the Chief Arbiter.

=== Venue ===
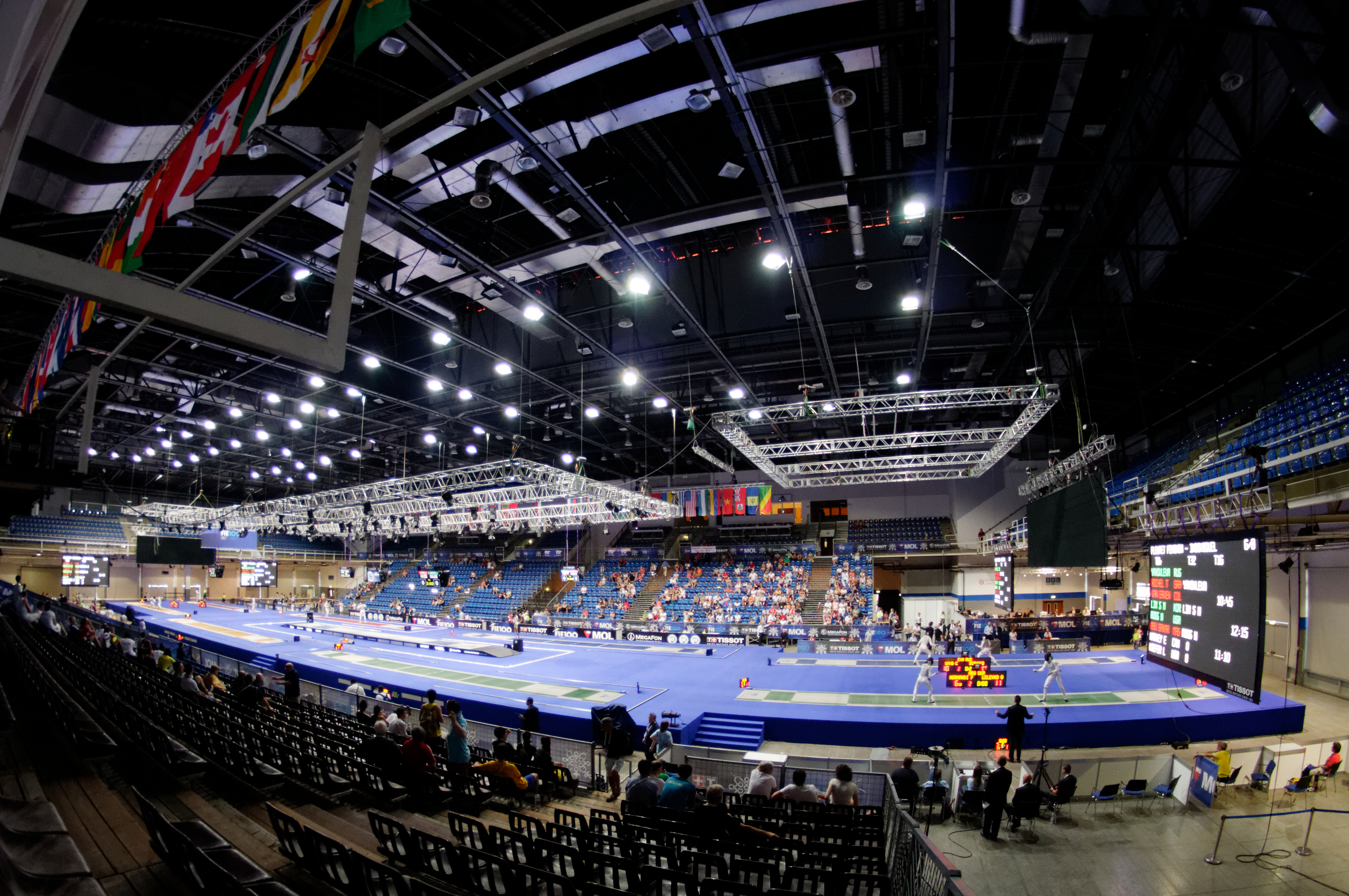
SYMA Sports and Conference Centre (pictured in 2013)

The event was held at the SYMA Sports and Conference Centre, which, besides the playing hall, also included an accreditation centre and an exposition and fan zone area. This facility was built in 2000 on the site of the old Budapest Sportcsarnok, which is halfway between the Puskás Aréna and the László Papp Budapest Sports Arena, in a neighbourhood that is entirely dedicated to recreation. The venue's capacity is 10,000 spectators, and it is the most modern of its kind in Hungary. It has previously hosted other sport events, such as the 2019 Hungarian Athletics Indoor Championships, the 2019 World Fencing Championships and the 2022 European Wrestling Championships.

Visitors had access to the stands at the playing field in five one-hour shifts per day from 15:00 to 20:00 CEST (UTC+2:00). Interested visitors could sign up for a visit to the grandstands on site at the counter near the cloakroom. In order for the competition to run smoothly without any disturbances, the number of visitors per shift was limited to 100, and they had to place their mobile phones and prohibited devices in the cloakroom. VIPs were allowed to use their mobile phones in silent mode in specially designated areas. The use of laptops and tablets was forbidden. Online checking of the games or any communication regarding the ongoing games was prohibited.

=== Fair play regulations ===
In July 2024, the Fair Play Team (FPT) for the Olympiad was announced. The FPT consisted of 16 members, including Fair Play Officers (FPO), Fair Play Experts (FPE) and FPE Candidates. Bojana Bejatović was appointed Chief Fair Play Officer. The FPT published instructions that players, team captains and third parties were required to comply with. Before the start of each round, all players and team captains had to undergo scanning before entering the playing venue, and all forbidden items (electronic devices and complex bags bigger than A4 format) had to be placed in a designated area. During each round, FPT members observed play to identify suspicious behaviour, and random checks were conducted using hand-held scanners. There were also privately conducted thorough checks in the presence of at least two officials if needed. Players were prohibited from leaving the playing hall during their games. Immediately after each round, thorough random checks were performed in the FPT frisking areas. All games were checked for cheating using Kenneth W. Regan's software. The Chief Fair Play Officer and her deputies received daily reports.

== The event ==
The torch relay began in India, which hosted the previous Chess Olympiad, and passed through eleven countries: Canada, Colombia, France, Georgia, Ghana, Kazakhstan, Morocco, New Zealand, Romania, Switzerland, and the United Arab Emirates. Hungarian grandmaster Judit Polgár marched with the torch on the streets of Budapest before entering the venue where she lit the cauldron.

=== Opening ceremony ===
The opening ceremony took place on 10 September at 18:00 CEST (UTC+2:00) at the Dr. Jeno Koltai Sports Center. Only participants in the Olympiad and members of the press were allowed to attend the ceremony.

Deputy State Secretary for Sport of the State Secretariat for Sports at the Ministry of Defence of Hungary Gábor Schmidt, FIDE President Arkady Dvorkovich and President of the Hungarian Chess Federation Zoltán Polyánszky spoke during the ceremony. Dvorkovich officially declared the 45th Chess Olympiad as open. The highlight of the ceremony was the lighting of the Olympic cauldron. A video documenting the route of the torch relay around the world was played. In the final seconds of the video, Judit Polgár appeared marching through the streets of Budapest holding the torch while dressed in red. The video ended with Polgár entering the venue of the opening ceremony to greet the audience and light the Olympic cauldron. Shortly afterwards, Judit's sisters Susan and Sofia joined the stage to draw lots for the colour of pieces for the top teams. They were directed by Chief Arbiter Ivan Syrovy to the gigantic Rubik's Cubes containing two smaller cubes, of which they had to choose one. It was determined that the top teams in both events would start their games in the first round with the black pieces.

The ceremony featured performances from French pianist and composer Jason Kouchak and Hungarian singer Lilla Vincze. Together they composed a song titled "Royal Game", which premiered during the opening ceremony. Rose May & Raul also performed "Trojan War", the official song of the Olympiad. The ceremony ended with a video tribute to all participating countries, which featured their names and flags shown one after another with songs performed by Kouchak and Vincze in the background.

=== Participating teams ===
The event was contested by a total of 380 teams, representing 195 national federations, both records for a Chess Olympiad. Hungary, as host country, was permitted to field three teams in each of the two sections. The Women's tournament featured a record-number of 183 teams from 181 federations. Saint Kitts and Nevis was the only national federation to field a team in the Women's event but not in the Open event. Russia and Belarus were banned from taking part by FIDE as a result of the ongoing Russian invasion of Ukraine. A team representing the Netherlands Antilles was permitted to compete, despite having dissolved itself in 2010, because the Curaçao Chess Federation remains officially registered as representing the dissolved country in the FIDE Directory.

==== Gender equality ====
FIDE initiated programmes with the goal of ensuring equal opportunities for women in chess. In this regard, the FIDE Commission for Women's Chess launched a special project called "National Female Team Initiative", which would enable more countries to send women's teams to the Chess Olympiad. The project provided support for the preparation of women's teams from nine countries and territories—Liechtenstein, Guernsey, Grenada, Saint Vincent and the Grenadines, Saint Kitts and Nevis, the United States Virgin Islands, Saint Lucia, Nauru, and the Cayman Islands—who made their debut in the Women's section. The debuting teams received financial support, expert coaching as well as substantial mental and material support for the training sessions conducted in July and August 2024. In addition, the FIDE Commission for Women's Chess started a pilot project called "ChessMom" aimed at supporting female players with children under the age of one who were unable to participate at Chess Olympiads in the past due to difficulties in finding childcare during the tournament. The commission appointed a care-giver for each child, and these people were official members of the national delegations. Some of the players who were involved in this project included Alina Kashlinskaya, Nana Dzagnidze, Yuliia Osmak, Aster Melake Bantiwalu, Rauha Shipindo and Nolwazi Nkwanyane.

==== Refugee Team ====
Teams of refugees participated for the first time at the Chess Olympiads. A selection process consisting of tournaments organised by FIDE at schools and community centres in Kakuma, Kenya, was conducted in order to find ten promising players—five for the team in the Open and five for the team in the Women's event—that would represent the refugees at the Budapest Chess Olympiad. The participants at the tournaments were from community chess clubs, primary and secondary schools, and the Girls Club. The effort was part of FIDE's initiative for refugees "Chess for Protection", which was launched in 2021 and jointly executed with UNHCR, Lutheran World Federation, Chess Kenya, and the Kakuma Chess Club.

Participating teams in the 45th Chess Olympiad
- Afghanistan^{c}
- Albania
- Algeria
- Andorra
- Angola
- Antigua and Barbuda^{a}
- Argentina
- Armenia
- Aruba
- Australia
- Austria
- Azerbaijan
- Bahamas
- Bahrain
- Bangladesh
- Barbados
- Belgium
- Belize^{a}
- Bermuda
- Bhutan
- Bolivia
- Bosnia and Herzegovina
- Botswana
- Brazil
- British Virgin Islands
- Brunei
- Bulgaria
- Burkina Faso^{a}
- Burundi
- Cambodia^{a}
- Cameroon
- Canada
- Cape Verde
- Cayman Islands
- Central African Republic
- Chad
- Chile
- China
- Chinese Taipei
- Colombia
- Comoros^{a}
- Costa Rica
- Croatia
- Cuba
- Cyprus
- Czech Republic
- Democratic Republic of Congo
- Denmark
- Djibouti
- Dominica
- Dominican Republic
- Ecuador
- Egypt
- El Salvador
- England
- Equatorial Guinea
- Eritrea
- Estonia
- Eswatini
- Ethiopia
- Faroe Islands^{a}
- Fiji
- Finland
- France
- Gabon^{a}
- The Gambia
- Georgia
- Germany
- Ghana
- Greece
- Grenada
- Guam
- Guatemala
- Guernsey
- Guyana
- Haiti
- Honduras
- Hong Kong
- Hungary (host nation)
- Hungary B
- Hungary C
- Iceland
- India
- Indonesia
- Iran
- Iraq
- Ireland
- Isle of Man^{a}
- Israel
- Italy
- Ivory Coast
- Jamaica
- Japan
- Jersey
- Jordan
- Kazakhstan
- Kenya
- Kosovo
- Kuwait
- Kyrgyzstan
- Laos
- Latvia
- Lebanon
- Lesotho
- Liberia
- Libya
- Liechtenstein
- Lithuania
- Luxembourg
- Macao^{a}
- Madagascar
- Malawi
- Malaysia
- Maldives
- Mali
- Malta
- Mauritania
- Mauritius
- Mexico
- Republic of Moldova
- Monaco
- Mongolia
- Montenegro
- Morocco
- Mozambique
- Myanmar^{a}
- Namibia
- Nepal
- Netherlands
- Curaçao (Netherlands Antilles)
- New Zealand
- Nicaragua
- Niger
- Nigeria
- North Macedonia
- Norway
- Oman
- Pakistan
- Palau
- Palestine
- Panama
- Papua New Guinea^{a}
- Paraguay
- Peru
- Philippines
- Poland
- Portugal
- Puerto Rico
- Qatar^{a}
- (FIDE) Refugee Team
- Romania
- **Saint Kitts and Nevis**^{b}
- Saint Lucia
- Saint Vincent and the Grenadines
- San Marino
- São Tomé and Príncipe
- Saudi Arabia^{a}
- Scotland
- Senegal
- Serbia
- Seychelles
- Sierra Leone
- Singapore
- Slovakia
- Slovenia
- Somalia
- South Africa
- South Korea
- South Sudan
- Spain
- Sri Lanka
- Sudan
- Suriname
- Sweden
- Switzerland
- Syria
- Tajikistan
- Tanzania
- Thailand
- Togo
- Trinidad and Tobago
- Tunisia
- Turkey
- Turkmenistan
- Uganda
- Ukraine
- United Arab Emirates
- United States
- United States Virgin Islands
- Uruguay
- Uzbekistan
- Vanuatu
- Venezuela
- Vietnam
- Wales
- Yemen^{a}
- Zambia
- Zimbabwe

Notes

^a Countries in italics denote those fielding teams in the Open event only.
^b Countries in bold denote those fielding teams in the Women's event only.
^c FIDE officially recognises the flag of the Islamic Republic of Afghanistan.

=== Competition format and calendar ===
The tournament was played in a Swiss system format. The time control for all games was 90 minutes for the first 40 moves, after which an additional 30 minutes were granted; an increment of 30 seconds per move was applied from the first move. Players were permitted to offer a draw at any time. A total of 11 rounds were played, and all teams had to be paired in every round. (Note: In case of an odd number of participating teams, a bye was allocated to the eligible team with the lowest ranking prescribed.)

In each round, four players from each team faced four players from another team; teams were permitted one reserve player who could be substituted between rounds. The four games were played simultaneously on four boards with alternating colours, scoring 1 game point for a win and ½ game point for a draw. The scores from each game were summed together to determine which team would win the round. Winning a round was worth two match points, regardless of the game point margin, while drawing a round was worth one match point. Teams were ranked in a table based on match points. Tie-breakers for the table were i) the Sonneborn–Berger system; ii) total game points scored; iii) the sum of the match points of the opponents, excluding the lowest one.

The event took place from 10 to 23 September 2024. Tournament rounds started on 11 September and ended with the final round on 22 September. All rounds began at 15:00 CEST (UTC+2:00), except for the final round which began at 11:00 CEST (UTC+2:00). There was one rest day on 17 September, after the sixth round.

All times are CEST (UTC+2:00)

**OC**	Opening ceremony	**A**	Arbiters meeting	**C**	Captains meeting	**1**	Round	**RD**	Rest day	**CC**	Closing ceremony

September	10th Tue	11th Wed	12th Thu	13th Fri	14th Sat	15th Sun	16th Mon	17th Tue	18th Wed	19th Thu	20th Fri	21st Sat	22nd Sun
Ceremonies	**OC**												**CC**
Meetings	**C**												
Meetings		**A**											
Tournament round		**1**	**2**	**3**	**4**	**5**	**6**	**RD**	**7**	**8**	**9**	**10**	**11**

=== Open event ===
The Open event was contested by a total of 975 players from 197 teams. It featured seven of the top ten players from the FIDE rating list published in September 2024. World number two Hikaru Nakamura decided not to play for a second Olympiad in a row, and Alireza Firouzja did not play for France. United States, India and China were regarded as favourites with all three having an average rating above 2700 points. United States' team, consisting of Fabiano Caruana, Wesley So, Leinier Dominguez, Levon Aronian and Ray Robson as a reserve player, had the highest average rating of 2757. India, whose second team had won bronze at the previous Olympiad, which the country had hosted, had the second highest rating of 2753 with three players from the bronze-winning team. The squad consisted of the challenger in the World Chess Championship 2024 Gukesh Dommaraju on board one followed by R Praggnanandhaa, Arjun Erigaisi, Vidit Gujrathi and Pentala Harikrishna. Former five-time World Champion Vishwanathan Anand decided to step aside for the younger generation and was the only one of India's top-rated players who did not play. China had the third highest average rating of 2727 with reigning World Champion Ding Liren playing on top board, followed by Wei Yi, Yu Yangyi, Bu Xiangzhi and Wang Yue.

The defending champions Uzbekistan were the fourth seeds. They were captained by former World Champion Vladimir Kramnik and fielded the same line-up that won the gold medal in 2022, which included Nodirbek Abdusattorov, Javokhir Sindarov, Nodirbek Yakubboev, Shamsiddin Vokhidov and Jakhongir Vakhidov. Former five-time World Champion and current world number one Magnus Carlsen played on top board for the sixth-seeded team of Norway. Hungary's first team had the ninth highest pre-tournament average rating and were stronger for Richard Rapport, who returned to play for his native country three months before the Olympiad, and Peter Leko. Other strong contenders included Poland, the Netherlands and England (strengthened by Nikita Vitiugov).

==== Open summary ====
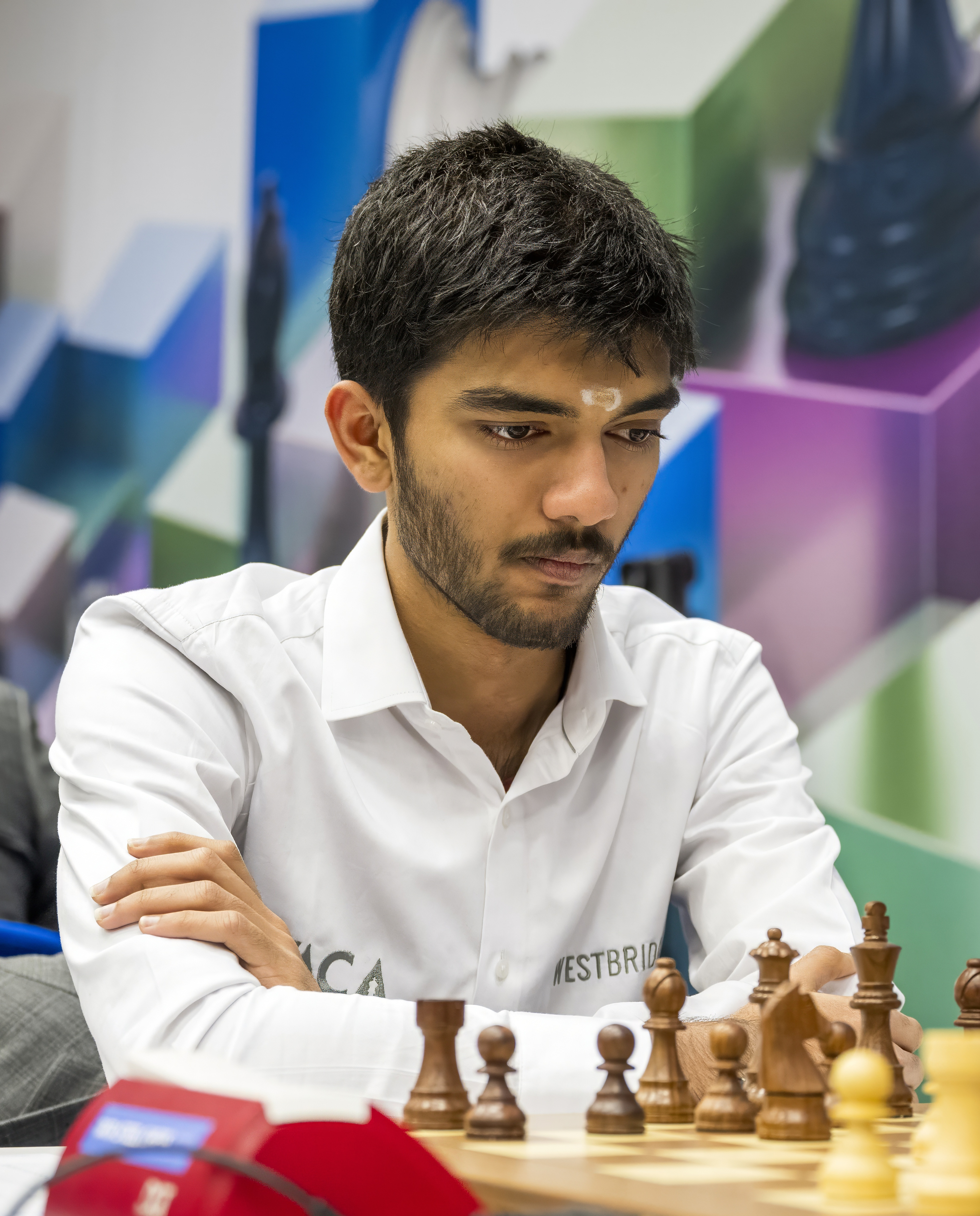
Gukesh Dommaraju of India was the best individual player in the Open event.

India won the gold medal in the Open event with a total of 21 out of 22 possible match points, which broke the previous record set by the United States and Ukraine of 20 out of 22 points in 2016. They were the only unbeaten team in the tournament, having scored ten wins and one draw, and scored four match points more than the rest of the field. It was India's first overall win at the Chess Olympiads. On the road to the gold medal, they defeated the United States, Hungary and China, and were held to a draw only by Uzbekistan in the ninth round. A group of five teams finished with 17 match points (eight wins, one draw and two losses), but the pre-tournament first-seeded team of the United States and defending champions Uzbekistan achieved better tie-breakers and won the silver and bronze medals, respectively. Despite the lacklustre performance from World Champion Ding Liren, who did not win a single game in the tournament, the Chinese team was in the race for the gold until the final round and ended in fourth place due to their last-round loss to the US team. Serbia came fifth and Armenia sixth after scoring 17 match points as well. Slovenia's strong performance with 16 match points (eight wins and three losses) earned them the ninth place. For the first time in the history of Chess Olympiads, no European team won a medal in the Open event.

The challenger in the World Chess Championship 2024, Gukesh Dommaraju of India, achieved the highest performance rating of 3056 in the Open event after scoring 9 out of 10 points (eight wins and two draws) on board one. On the other boards, individual gold medals were also won by Thai Dai Van Nguyen of the Czech Republic with 7½ out of 10 and a performance rating of 2783, Arjun Erigaisi of India who had the highest individual score in the tournament of 10 out of 11 with a performance rating of 2968, Shamsiddin Vokhidov of Uzbekistan who scored 8 out of 10 with a performance rating of 2779, and Frederik Svane of Germany who played as a reserve player and finished with 9 out of 10 and a performance rating of 2791. Gukesh's win against China's Wei Yi in the seventh round was awarded the Olympiad Best Game prize. Erigaisi's performance earned him the third place on the FIDE rankings. Magnus Carlsen won the bronze medal on board one, leaving his ambition of eliminating one of the few gaps in his career unfulfilled.

English chess journalist Leonard Barden described India's performance as a "seminal moment in chess history", and compared it to the radio chess match between the US and the Soviet Union in 1945 that the Soviet Union won 15½–4½ to mark the beginning of their chess dominance. He added that Gukesh and Erigaisi could be Mikhail Botvinnik and Vasily Smyslov or Anatoly Karpov and Garry Kasparov of the 2020s and 2030s. Barden mentioned Vishwanathan Anand as inspiration of India's success as he had mentored several of the players. India's prime minister Narendra Modi received the Indian teams at his residence to congratulate for their achievements, and All India Chess Federation announced cash awards for the members of the winning teams.

Final standings
#	Country	Players	Average rating	MP	dSB^{†}
1st place, gold medalist(s)	**India**	**Gukesh, Praggnanandhaa, Erigaisi, Vidit, Harikrishna**	**2753**	**21**	
2nd place, silver medalist(s)	United States	Caruana, So, Domínguez, Aronian, Robson	2757	17	395.0
3rd place, bronze medalist(s)	Uzbekistan	Abdusattorov, Yakubboev, Sindarov, Vokhidov, Vakhidov	2690	17	387.0
4	China	Ding Liren, Wei Yi, Yu Yangyi, Bu Xiangzhi, Wang Yue	2724	17	379.5
5	Serbia	Predke, Sarana, Inđić, Markuš, Ivić	2649	17	360.5
6	Armenia	Martirosyan, Sargsyan, Sargissian, Hovhannisyan, Grigoryan	2645	17	335.0
7	Germany	Keymer, Kollars, Blübaum, Donchenko, Svane	2667	16	354.5
8	Azerbaijan	Suleymanli, Abasov, Mamedov, Mamedyarov, Muradli	2657	16	351.0
9	Slovenia	Fedoseev, Demchenko, Šubelj, Šebenik, Lavrenčič	2576	16	341.5
10	Spain	Shirov, Antón Guijarro, Vallejo Pons, Pichot, Santos Latasa	2654	16	339.0

Notes

- Average ratings calculated by chess-results.com based on September 2024 FIDE ratings.
- ^† The Sonneborn–Berger score is a tie-breaking criterion used to rank teams with equal match points.

All board medals were given out according to performance ratings for players who played at least eight games at the tournament.

Board	Gold	Silver	Bronze
Board 1	Gukesh Dommaraju; India	Nodirbek Abdusattorov; Uzbekistan	Magnus Carlsen; Norway
Board 2	Thai Dai Van Nguyen; Czech Republic	Toni Lazov; North Macedonia	Ediz Gürel; Turkey
Board 3	Arjun Erigaisi; India	Yu Yangyi; China	Lê Tuấn Minh; Vietnam
Board 4	Shamsiddin Vokhidov; Uzbekistan	Levon Aronian; United States	Alan Pichot; Spain
Reserve	Frederik Svane; Germany	Benjámin Gledura; Hungary	Velimir Ivić; Serbia

=== Women's event ===
The Women's event was contested by a total of 909 players from 183 teams. It featured only Nana Dzagnidze from the top ten players according to the FIDE rating list published in September 2024. India had the highest pre-tournament average rating of 2467, but the team was weakened by the absence of Koneru Humpy who played in 2022. The team was led by Harika Dronavalli and also included Vaishali R, Divya Deshmukh, Vantika Agrawal and Tania Sachdev. The silver medallists from the previous Olympiad Georgia were the second seeds with an average rating of 2462. The squad consisted of Nana Dzagnidze, Lela Javakhishvili, Nino Batsiashvili, Bella Khotenashvili and Salome Melia. Poland were the third-seeded team with an average rating of 2422. The team was led by Alina Kashlinskaya, who won the first leg of the FIDE Women's Grand Prix 2024–25 in Tbilisi, and also included Monika Soćko, Aleksandra Maltsevskaya, who changed federation, Oliwia Kiołbasa, who scored the best individual performance at the previous Olympiad, and Alicja Śliwicka.

Despite the fact that China was missing all four top players—Hou Yifan, Ju Wenjun, Tan Zhongyi and Lei Tingjie—the young team was still competitive and were seeded in fourth place with an average rating of 2416. Ukraine as defending champions were fifth seeds and were severely weakened by the absence of Anna and Mariya Muzychuk, who were both among the top ten rated players in the world. In their absence, the team was led by Yuliia Osmak on board one followed by former World Women's Champion Anna Ushenina, Nataliya Buksa, Inna Gaponenko and Evgeniya Doluhanova.

==== Women's summary ====
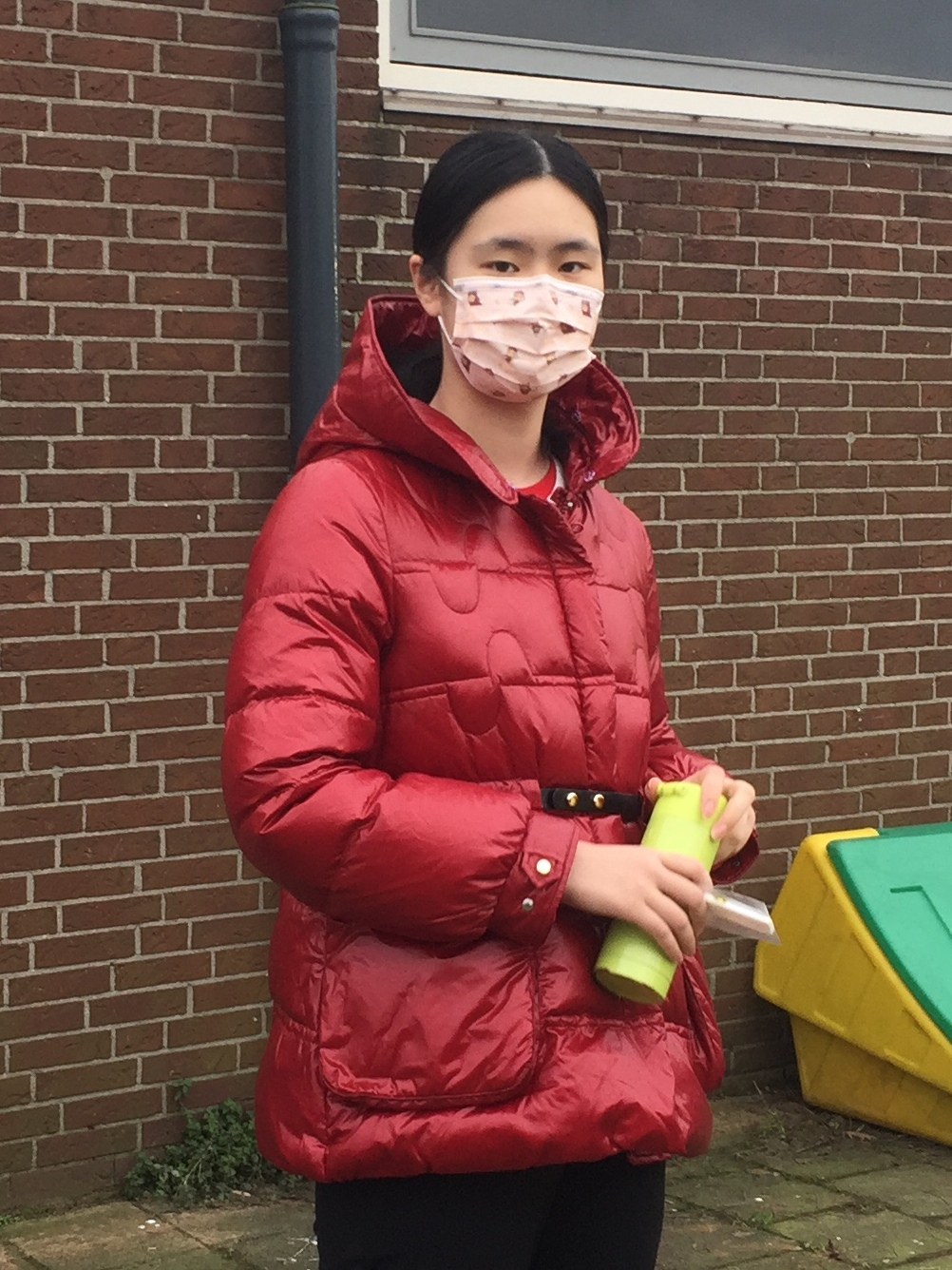
Zhu Jiner of China won an individual gold medal on board one in the Women's event.

India justified their role as pre-tournament top seeds according to the average rating and won the gold medal in the Women's event with a total of 19 match points, having recorded nine wins, one draw and one loss. It was India's first overall win at the Chess Olympiads. The team defeated Georgia in round seven and China in round ten on the road to the gold medal, but also lost to the third-seeded team of Poland in the eighth and drew with the United States in the ninth rounds. Kazakhstan had a strong performance that earned them the silver medal with 18 match points (eight wins, two draws and one loss), and the United States completed the podium with 17 match points (eight wins, one draw and two losses). Following India's loss to Poland and draw with the United States, the Kazakh team was sole leader with two rounds to go. However, they lost the lead due to the two ties with Georgia and the United States in the final rounds. The US team had the best tie-breaker amongst the four teams tied for third place, ahead of Spain, Armenia and Georgia, which got them the bronze medal. Without their top players, China finished in seventh place and defending champions Ukraine came eighth. For the first time in the history of Chess Olympiads, no European team won a medal in the Women's event.

The highest performance rating of 2676 was achieved by Dana Kochavi who played as a reserve for Israel and had a perfect score of 8 out of 8 possible points. On the other boards, individual gold medals were also won by Zhu Jiner of China with 7 out of 9 and a performance rating of 2597, Carissa Yip of the United States who had the highest individual score in the tournament of 10 out of 11 with a performance rating of 2634, Divya Deshmukh who scored 9½ out of 11 with a performance rating of 2608, and Vantika Agrawal of India with 7½ out of 9 and a performance rating of 2558.

Final standings
#	Country	Players	Average rating	MP	dSB^{†}
1st place, gold medalist(s)	**India**	**Harika, Vaishali, Divya, Vantika, Tania**	**2467**	**19**	
2nd place, silver medalist(s)	Kazakhstan	Assaubayeva, Kamalidenova, Balabayeva, Nurman, Kairbekova	2373	18	
3rd place, bronze medalist(s)	United States	Tokhirjonova, Yip, Krush, Lee, Zatonskih	2387	17	418.0
4	Spain	Khademalsharieh, García Martín, Vega, Matnadze, Calzetta Ruiz	2375	17	402.0
5	Armenia	Mkrtchian L., Mkrtchyan M., Danielian, Sargsyan, Gaboyan	2363	17	391.0
6	Georgia	Dzagnidze, Javakhishvili, Batsiashvili, Khotenashvili, Melia	2462	17	388.0
7	China	Zhu Jiner, Song Yuxin, Guo Qi, Ni Shiqun, Lu Miaoyi	2416	16	434.0
8	Ukraine	Osmak, Ushenina, Buksa, Gaponenko, Doluhanova	2400	16	355.5
9	Poland	Kashlinskaya, Soćko, Maltsevskaya, Kiołbasa, Śliwicka	2422	16	352.0
10	Bulgaria	Stefanova, Salimova, Radeva, Krasteva, Peycheva	2355	16	348.5

Notes

- Average ratings calculated by chess-results.com based on September 2024 FIDE ratings.
- ^‡ The Sonneborn–Berger score is a tie-breaking criterion used to rank teams with equal match points.

All board medals were given out according to performance ratings for players who played at least eight games at the tournament.

Board	Gold	Silver	Bronze
Board 1	Zhu Jiner; China	Sarasadat Khademalsharieh; Spain	Nana Dzagnidze; Georgia
Board 2	Carissa Yip; United States	Elisabeth Pähtz; Germany	Song Yuxin; China
Board 3	Divya Deshmukh; India	Sabrina Vega; Spain	Elina Danielian; Armenia
Board 4	Vantika Agrawal; India	Alice Lee; United States	Anna M. Sargsyan; Armenia
Reserve	Dana Kochavi; Israel	Nodira Nadirjanova; Uzbekistan	Lu Miaoyi; China

=== Gaprindashvili Trophy ===
The Nona Gaprindashvili Trophy, created by FIDE in 1997 and named after former Women's World Champion Nona Gaprindashvili, is given to the teams with the best combined performance in the Open and Women's tournaments (sum of their positions in both standings). India won the Trophy ahead of the United States in second place and Armenia in third place.

#	Team	Sum of positions
**1**	**India**	**2**
2	United States	5
3	Armenia	11

== FIDE Congress ==
The 95th FIDE Congress (Note: The FIDE Congress is an annual event that combines the sessions of FIDE's main bodies—namely, the General Assembly, the FIDE Council, the Zonal Council and the FIDE Commissions. In even years, it is preferred that the FIDE Congress takes place during the Chess Olympiad, and it is therefore organised by the organiser of the Chess Olympiad.) was held during the Olympiad, from 17 to 22 September, with its General Assembly on 21 and 22 September. On 19 September, the FIDE Council rejected the proposal by the Kyrgyz Chess Federation to restore the full membership rights of the Russian Chess Federation and the Belarusian Chess Federation with immediate effect. This decision came after several national federations and chess players raised their voices against the proposals, and national federations of FIDE had received warning messages by the International Olympic Committee (IOC), the Association of IOC Recognised International Sports Federations (AIRISF) and Western government agencies. Nonetheless, it was suggested that FIDE should consult the IOC to allow Russian disabled or junior teams to be excluded from the ban. On 22 September, the General Assembly upheld the ban on Russian and Belarusian players, but it supported a move to consider easing the restrictions on disabled and junior players in consultation with the IOC.

The elections for three FIDE Commissions were held during the Congress. Roberto Rivello (Italy) was re-elected as Chairman of the Constitutional Commission without opposition, while Erald Dervishi (Albania), Ian Wilkinson (Jamaica), Marouane Tabti (Algeria) and Ivy Claire Amoko (Uganda) were elected as members out of a total of six candidates. (Note: According to Article 24.10 of FIDE Electoral Rules, "if all the most voted candidates are of the same gender, the less voted of them will not be elected and the most voted candidate of the other gender will be elected". In this particular case, Ivy Claire Amoko (Uganda) was elected as a member of the FIDE Constitutional Commission despite winning fewer votes than Jorge Arias Bouzada (Uruguay).) Allen Priest (United States) was elected Chairman of the Verification Commission as the only candidate, while Gulmira Dauletova (Kazakhstan), Eric Bopala (Canada), Malcolm Powell (Cayman Islands) and Panu Laine (Finland) were elected as members out of seven candidates. Yolander Persaud (Guyana) was elected Chairman of the Ethics & Disciplinary Commission out of four candidates, while Khaled Arfa (Tunisia), David Hater (United States), Olga Baskakova (Kazakhstan), Ravindra Dongre (India), Alan Borda (Bolivia) and Ali Nihat Yazıcı (Turkey) were elected as members of the FIDE Ethics & Disciplinary Commission out of eight candidates.

Other notable decisions made at the Congress included the support for the proposal by Kazakhstan Chess Federation president Timur Turlov to make The International School Chess Federation (ISCF) an affiliated organisation, the approval of the Azerbaijani proposal to establish a Turkic-speaking Countries' Chess Association as an affiliated organisation, and the approval of the application from the Greenlandic Chess Federation to become an affiliate member of FIDE.

== FIDE 100 Awards ==
As 2024 marked the hundredth anniversary of FIDE, the organisation decided to honour those who had made and were making exceptional contributions to the world of chess. In this regard, a series of awards was announced to recognise individuals and organisations who had significantly contributed to the development and promotion of chess throughout the past century. The FIDE 100 Awards aimed at different members of the chess community. FIDE President Arkady Dvorkovich said that these awards would hopefully "inspire future generations to take up chess and bring the game to new heights". The deadline for submitting nominations was 15 August, and each category had specific qualification criteria, nomination procedures and selection processes. Self-nominations were allowed in the following categories: Best Chess Journalist, Best Photographer, Best Educator, Chess Social Impact and Advocate for Women in Chess. Some recipients were chosen by a distinguished panel of chess grandmasters, historians and educators, while the winners of the Best Male Player and Best Female Players would be determined through a public vote. The winners across award categories were:

- Best Male Player: Magnus Carlsen
- Best Female Player: Judit Polgár
- Best Male Arbiter: Andrzej Filipowicz
- Best Female Arbiter: Anastasia Sorokina
- FIDE Trainers' 100 Years Award (male): Vladimir Tukmakov
- FIDE Trainers' 100 Years Award (female): Susan Polgar
- Best Male Team: Armenia
- Best Female Team: Georgia
- Best Social Media Influencer: Hikaru Nakamura
- Best Chess Journalist: Leonard Barden
- The Most Memorable FIDE Chess Tournament: World Chess Championship 1972
- The Most Memorable Private Chess Tournament: Linares International Chess Tournament
- FIDE Book - 100 Years: My 60 Memorable Games by Bobby Fischer
- Best Photographer: Anastasia Karlovich
- Best Educator: Abel Talamantez
- Chess Social Impact: Chess for Freedom, Cook County Sheriff's Office
- Advocate for Women in Chess: Jean-Michel Rapaire
- Inclusivity: International Physically Disabled Chess Association (IPCA), International Braille Chess Association (IBCA) and International Chess Committee of Deaf (ICCD)
- Presidential Award: Friðrik Ólafsson, Nona Gaprindashvili, Xie Jun, Smbat Lputian, Faiq Hasanov, Geurt Gijssen, Georgios Makropoulos and Rex Sinquefield

== Marketing ==
=== Official song and fan video ===
The Hungarian Chess Federation and the National Event Management Agency selected "Trojan War" by Rose May & Raul as official song of the 45th Chess Olympiad. Additionally, a fan song "Checkmate Dreams" was composed by Jan Matthies, an IT consultant from Hamburg, who used the program Suno AI to produce a rap song with lyrics. He contacted the National Event Management Agency and was permitted to use the official logo.

=== Promotional activities ===
There were multiple promotional activities that were carried out during the Olympiad. A FIDE100 Exhibition took place from 10 to 23 September to commemorate the 100-year anniversary of FIDE. A photographic art installation called "CAPTURE", which celebrated the game of chess, was exhibited on the Vigadó Square from 17 to 23 September. The installation featured luminous photos of people playing chess from different locations around the world. Singer Juga released the song "Queen Trap" with just lyrics promoting female empowerment and sorority, and produced a music short film in co-production with FIDE Commission for Women's Chess. The filming took place at the Museum of Fine Arts during the rest day of the Olympiad, on 17 September, and it brought together female chess players from 160 countries, including Judit Polgár, Alexandra Kosteniuk, Elisabeth Pähtz, Bibisara Assaubayeva and Tania Sachdev amongst others. The 10th Judit Polgar Global Chess Festival was held at the Hungarian National Gallery on 17 September and at the InterContinental Hotel Budapest on 18 September. Hungarian architect and inventor Ernő Rubik, known for the Rubik's Cube, was patron of the festival. The Judit Polgar Chess Foundation invited children and adults to the Chess Palace, a project by Judit Polgár with the goal of exploring the chess world and its inhabitants, where attendees could get an autograph of the Polgár sisters. The 4th EDU Chess Summit took place during the Olympiad, at which guest speakers discussed chess as an educational tool to develop essential life skills. There was also a chess quiz in which participants walked around the hall to find and scan QR codes that led to the questions that they had to answer. Official partners and sponsors for the Olympiad included Tech Mahindra, Coca-Cola HBC Hungary, Chessable, Freedom Holding, the Judit Polgar Chess Foundation and Dorko.

== Other events ==
=== Tournaments ===
A number of tournaments intended for the general public took place during the Olympiad. The Olympiad Expo Classic was held in the BOK "C" Sports Hall from 12 to 21 September, which offered opportunities to compete in the same venue as the participants in the Olympiad. Prizes were awarded to the top five participants, and the first prize was worth €350 plus a cup and a medal. Special prizes were given to the best senior, best woman and best participants with a rating under 2000. Other tournaments held during the Olympiad included the Expo FIDE Rapid on 11 September, the U18 Expo FIDE Rapid on 13 September, the Expo Theme Tournament (Hungarian Openings) on 12, 16 and 20 September, the Expo Dynamic Endgames on 14 September, the Expo Hand and Brain Chess on 15 September, the Expo Chess 20 on 15 September, the Expo Consul Chess on 16 September, the Expo Fischer Random Chess (Chess 960) on 19 September, the Expo FIDE Blitz on 20 September, and the Mad Scientist EXPO Rapid on 21 September. Additionally, simultaneous exhibitions were played by international master and women's grandmaster Ildikó Mádl and grandmaster József Pintér on 15 boards on 14 September, and by grandmasters Zoltan Gyimesi and Csaba Balogh also on 15 boards on 19 September.

=== Seminars and conferences ===
Several seminars and conferences took place during the Olympiad. The FIDE EDU Preparation of Teachers course was held in the periods 15–16 September and 20–21 September with the goal of providing hands-on activities designed to integrate chess into academia. Lecturers in the course were women international master and Secretary of the FIDE Chess in Education Commission Rita Atkins of Hungary and women international master, FIDE Instructor and FIDE EDU Commission Member Anzel Laubscher of South Africa. The FIDE Fair Play Seminar took place in the period 15–18 September with the aim to provide knowledge about fair play and best practices at events. The #SOCIALCHESS Conference was organised by the FIDE Social Commission at the InterContinental Hotel Budapest on 21 September with the goal to discuss the benefits chess gives to the society through the FIDE social projects, such as Chess for Protection, Chess for Freedom, Infinite Chess, Chess for Elderly and Chess for Life. Some of the participants in the conference included the Deputy Chair of the FIDE Management Board Dana Reizniece-Ozola, FIDE Social Commission Chair André Vögtlin, a FIDE Refugee Team representative and a UNHCR representative. The Women&Chess&Balance conference was organised by the Commission for Women's Chess at the InterContinental Hotel Budapest on 21 September and aimed at empowering women in the world of chess and beyond. Some of the topics in the conference programme included "Sporty Strategists: Chess and Beyond", "Management", "Women's Safeguard", "Building a Chess Tournament's Brand" and "Social Media Management". Speakers at the conference were the Chief Chess Officer of Chess.com Daniel Rensch, Dana Reizniece-Ozola, top chess event organisers, renowned bloggers and representatives from UNHCR amongst others.

== Concerns and controversies ==
=== Sanctions against Russia and Belarus ===
In March 2022, following the recommendation by the International Olympic Committee in response to the Russian invasion of Ukraine, the FIDE Council suspended the national teams of Russia and Belarus from participation in official FIDE tournaments until further notice. As a result, the national teams of both countries did not enter the 44th Chess Olympiad, and some players who disapproved of the invasion decided to leave the country, switch federations or play under the FIDE flag instead of the Russian flag.

In August 2024, the Kyrgyzstan Chess Federation submitted a resolution to the FIDE Congress to restore the full membership rights of the Chess Federation of Russia and the Belarusian Chess Federation with immediate effect, which had to be discussed at the meeting of the General Assembly during the FIDE Congress at the Chess Olympiad in Budapest. The resolution was met with criticism by the chess federations of Germany, the United Kingdom, the United States and Ukraine. Former World Champions Garry Kasparov and Magnus Carlsen also spoke against lifting the ban. Ukrainian chess player Vasyl Ivanchuk signed a petition against the Kyrgyz resolution, which was later signed by the whole Olympic team of Ukraine, urging not to lift the sanctions against Russia. In addition, the United States Department of State issued a statement in which they called on FIDE to maintain the ban, and this view was shared by the United States Ambassador to Ukraine Bridget A. Brink as well as the Bureau of Educational and Cultural Affairs. As a result of the proposed resolution, the potential exclusion of chess from IOC was brought to a table, which might put the government funding for national chess federations at risk. George Mastrokoukos compared the situation of FIDE with that of the International Boxing Association (IBA), which had recently been excluded from IOC.

=== Accommodation ===
In early 2024, many chess federations and delegations raised concerns regarding difficulties with accommodation and the extra costs incurred. President of the Monaco Chess Federation Jean-Michel Rapaire explained that, according to the initial invitation sent by the organisers to chess federations on 18 April, all teams would get two free standard double rooms and two free standard single rooms with full board, whereas the chief of delegation would be provided with a standard single room with full board. However, on 15 August, they were emailed that the chief of delegation is at their own cost and would not stay in the same hotel. The chess federations of Germany and Scotland reported that their teams had been scattered in different hotels. Eventually, Monaco, Germany and Scotland rented accommodation on their own outside of the official hotels recommended by the organisers. Similar accommodation problems were later stated by the delegations from Turkey, Croatia and Bulgaria. Malcolm Pein reported that the organisers had no understanding that many countries would need extra rooms in addition to the standard offer of two free single and four free double rooms per team. Dutch player Anish Giri commented on the situation that there were not enough hotel rooms at the Olympiad. FIDE Chief Executive Officer Emil Sutovsky faced criticism for his alleged ignorance of the situation.

=== Visas ===
A source associated with FIDE revealed that up to 60 countries were experiencing visa problems for the Chess Olympiad, and most of these countries were from Africa and the Caribbean. As of 9 September, the list of countries with visa problems included Algeria, Eswatini, Lesotho, Gambia, Central African Republic, Tunisia and Egypt from Africa as well as Afghanistan, Lebanon, Yemen, Syria and Iraq. Afghan player on board four Sepehr Sakhawaty explained that the team applied for visas on 7 August at the Embassy of Hungary in Iran, as there is no Hungarian embassy working in Afghanistan. The whole team's applications were rejected on 5 September. They requested an appeal from the embassy on 7 September, and they were still awaiting response one day before the start of the Olympiad. In the first round, a total of 20 teams in the Open and Women's sections were not paired largely due to visa and travel problems. President of the Hungarian Chess Federation Zoltán Polyánszky said that they did a lot to get teams to Budapest. He added that teams were still on their way and asked one to two days of patience. FIDE President Arkady Dvorkovich mentioned the rejection rate for the Chess Olympiad was significantly lower than the normal rejection rate of 16.5 per cent for the Schengen Area.

=== Other incidents ===
The accommodation problems caused members of the national delegations to be scattered across different hotels, contributing to transport difficulties in Budapest. As a result, the games of the first round started with a 20-minute delay and the games of the second round with a 10-minute delay. Journalist Vlad Ghita wrote from his X account that it was "unclear whether the shuttle buses are to be blamed, or whether the delegations ran late". Magnus Carlsen arrived ten minutes late for his game against Colombian grandmaster Roberto Garcia Pantoja in the third round as he had been travelling by bike in the rain, rushing to the venue and was confused about the entrance. Carlsen thought that he had forfeited the game before he arrived to the venue, but the games of the third round had already started with a delay, so he had enough time to avoid forfeit thanks to Chess.com photographer Maria Emelianova who showed him a shortcut to the playing hall. Following the game, he commented that he was staying in a different hotel from the others and was supposed to be picked up by them. However, he was suddenly informed that the traffic was horrible and they would arrive later, so he decided that biking to the venue might be faster than travelling by car.

A fair-play check in the match between Lebanon and Egypt in the third round of the Open event detected a SIM card in Egypt's Sameh Sadek. Consequently, his win against Antoine Kassis was reversed as the SIM card was a disallowed electronic device according to the anti-cheating measures at the Olympiad. A disallowed device was detected in the match between Bosnia and Herzegovina and Thailand in the fourth round of the Open event, in which Dejan Marjanović initially lost his game against Tinnakrit Arunnuntapanich, but the score was reversed after the anti-cheating control had been performed. In the same round, an unused SIM card was found in the wallet of seven-time Argentine Champion Diego Flores in a fair-play check following his win in Argentina's 3½–½ victory over Bolivia, so his win was turned into a loss. However, the appeal by his federation and captain Robert Hungaski was accepted, and the result was reversed again.

In the match between Israel and Bangladesh in the tenth round in the Open event, Bangladeshi grandmaster Enamul Hossain forfeited his game against Tamir Nabaty. He announced his boycott in a post from his Facebook profile and complained about Israel's participation due to the ongoing conflict with Palestine by referring to the non-participation of Russia and Belarus. The Swiss system paired Israel and Iran to play in the final round of the Women's event. However, as Iran's government refuses to recognize the nation of Israel, the Iranian team decided not to play. The arbiters fixed the score to 4–0 in Israel's favour after the game's default times were finished. Israel's player on board one Marsel Efroimski said that it "was a shame that politics is mixed with sports". Chess journalist Leon Watson commented that the problem with Iran was a big reason why chess was out of the Olympic movement until 1995. He called on FIDE to take an action.

== See also ==
- Chess Olympiad
- 2nd unofficial Chess Olympiad

== Notes ==
Preceded by 44th Chess Olympiad; Chennai, India	Chess Olympiad; 45th Olympiad (2024); Budapest, Hungary	Succeeded by 46th Chess Olympiad; Samarkand, Uzbekistan
