= Xeniya Balabayeva =

Kazakhstani chess player (born 2005)

Personal information
- Born: 26 December 2005 (age 20)

Chess career
- Country: Kazakhstan
- Title: Woman Grandmaster (2024)
- Peak rating: 2396 (November 2026)

Xeniya Balabayeva (also Kseniya; Russian: Ксения Балабаева; born 26 December 2005) is a Kazakh chess player who holds the title of Woman Grandmaster (WGM) (2024).

== Biography ==
In 2018, Balabayeva won the Western Asia Youth Chess Championship in G14 age group. In 2019, she won the Asian Youth Rapid Chess Championship in G14 age group. In 2020, Balabayeva won the Kazakhstani Youth Chess Championship in G16 age group with a hundred percent result: 9 out of 9. In 2021 she won the Asia Youth Chess Championship in G16 age group.

In 2021, Balabayeva ranked in 2nd place in Kazakhstani Youth Chess Championship in G20 age group and Kazakhstani Women's Chess Championship. In this same year, she won the Online World Youth Chess Championship in Girls under 16 age group.

Balabayeva played for Kazakhstan in the Women's Chess Olympiads:

- In 2022, at third board in the 44th Chess Olympiad (women) in Chennai (+3, =5, -2);
- In 2024, at third board in the 45th Chess Olympiad (women) in Budapest (+4, =5, -0) and won a team silver medal.

In 2021, she was awarded the FIDE Women International Master (WIM) title and received the FIDE Women Grandmaster (WGM) title three years later.
