= Miklós Seszták =

Hungarian jurist and politician (born 1968)

Miklós Seszták MP
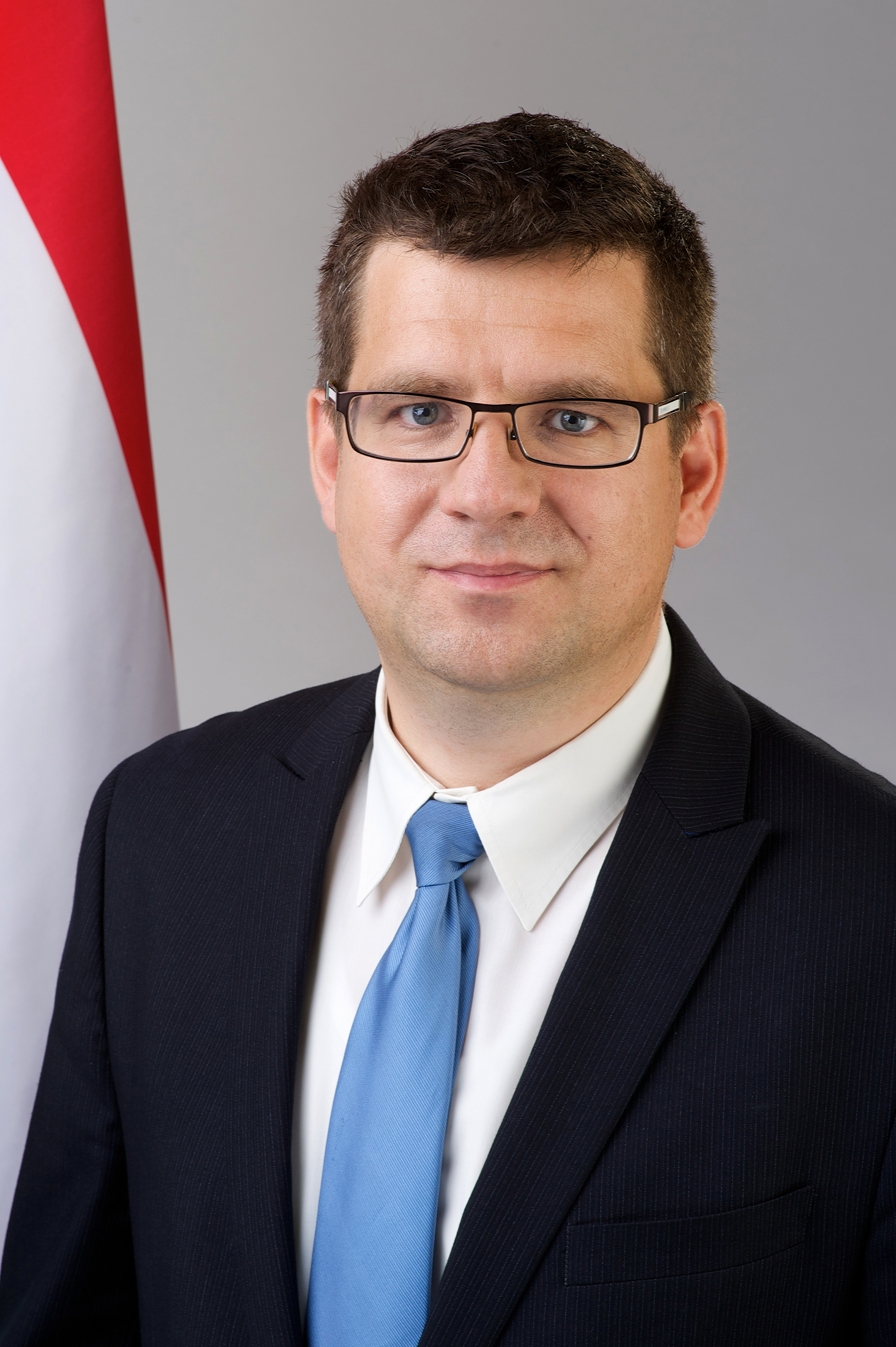
- Miklós Seszták

Minister of National Development
- In office 6 June 2014 – 18 May 2018
- Preceded by: Zsuzsanna Németh
- Succeeded by: Office abolished

Member of the National Assembly
- Incumbent
- Assumed office 14 May 2010

Personal details
- Born: 31 October 1968 (age 58) Budapest, Hungary
- Party: Fidesz, KDNP
- Children: 2
- Profession: jurist

Miklós Seszták (born 31 October 1968), is a Hungarian jurist and politician. He served as Minister of National Development in Viktor Orbán's third cabinet from 2014 to 2018. He was elected Member of Parliament for Kisvárda, Szabolcs-Szatmár-Bereg County in 2010. He is one of the vice presidents of the Christian Democratic People's Party (KDNP).

== Early career ==
He was born into a Greek Catholic priestly family in Budapest on 31 October 1968. He graduated from the Faculty of Law of the Eötvös Loránd University (ELTE) in 1994. After that he has practiced as a trainee lawyer until his successful completion of the professional examination in 1996, when opened his own law firm in Kisvárda.

Supported by mayor and Fidesz member Albert Oláh, he became involved in politics in 1998, when he was elected to the local government body of Kisvárda as a candidate of a local civic association. From 2002 to 2010, he was also a member of the General Assembly of Szabolcs-Szatmár-Bereg County. In the following years his relationship with Oláh became gradually conflictual; the Fidesz did not nominee Oláh for the position of mayor in the 2010 local elections. According to Oláh, Seszták had a determining role in this decision. As Index.hu noted Seszták had as much influence in the Kisvárda local government as parliamentary group leader János Lázár in the National Assembly. As Member of Parliament, he joined the Christian Democratic People's Party (KDNP) parliamentary group. Seszták was a member of the Economic and Information Technology Committee between 2010 and 2014. He was elected Vice Chairman of the committee for brief time until his appointment as Minister of National Development in June 2014. According to his declaration of assets published in 2012, he was the second wealthiest MP after Socialist politician János Veres in that year.

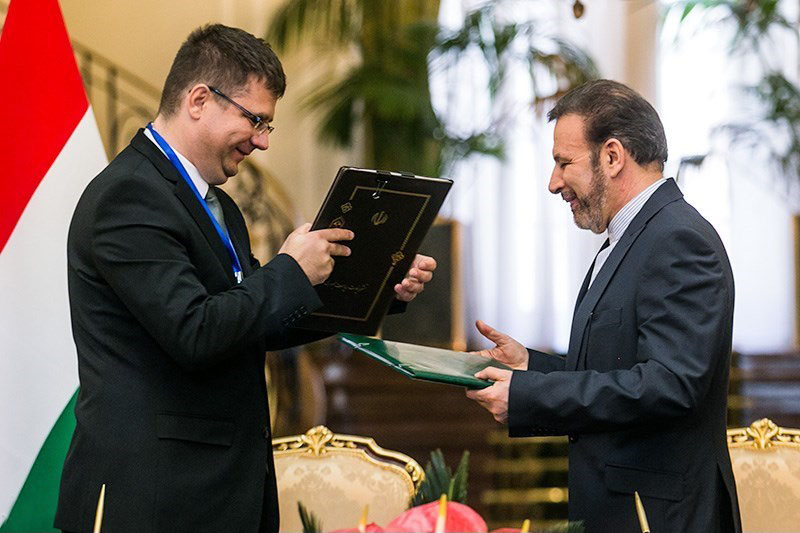
Seszták with Iranian ICT minister Mahmoud Vaezi in Tehran in November 2015

In February 2013, Varánusz blog revealed from public data of parliamentary, registry court and National Development Agency (NFÜ) documents that Seszták was simultaneously a member of the parliamentary subcommittees for Information Technology and Telecommunications and Procurement and Enterprise Regulatory and a member of the Supervisory Board of the Enternet Invest Ltd. in 2012, a company partially under Cypriot offshore control, when along with five companies controlled by as well as other Cypriot companies, registered under the same address, won 12.5 billion Hungarian forints (€45 million at the time) for the procurement of the National Development Agency for European funding for the Internet broadband in regions. Following critics by opposition MPs who claimed Seszták has used his political influence and parliamentary positions to obtaining the tender, the Prime Minister's Office revoked the opaque part of the tender in October 2013 and terminated the contract concluded earlier in January 2013. In April 2014 the European Commission informed the government that the European Anti-fraud Office (OLAF) found indications of corruption following a complete investigation, as a result the entire amount has been withdrawn from the project.

== Minister of National Development ==
Following the 2014 parliamentary election, Seszták was appointed Minister of National Development in Viktor Orbán's newly formed third cabinet, replacing Zsuzsanna Németh. Seszták was one of the two KDNP members (albeit also Fidesz politician) of the government, along with Deputy Prime Minister and party leader Zsolt Semjén during the inauguration. Seszták told his key objectives as minister are strengthening the economy, development of the countryside and support for families. He appointed his state secretaries on 16 June 2014 (Administration: Gábor Czepek, National Wealth: Sára Hegmann-Nemes, Parliamentary Affairs: János Fónagy, Energy: András Aradszki, Climate Policy: Zsolt Szabó, Infrastructure: László Tasó).

Few weeks after his appointment as minister, Index.hu revealed that Seszták involved as a lawyer in establishing hundreds of short-lived companies and limited partnerships with Russian and Ukrainian background between 2001 and 2003 in Kisvárda, most of them abolished leaving behind public debts. Referring to the lawyers' professional secrecy, the press office of Seszták's ministry has not responded in substance the content of the article. As a result, four opposition parties (Jobbik, Democratic Coalition, Politics Can Be Different and Together) demanded the minister's resignation or dismissal.

In September 2026, Seszták was arrested after his legal immunity was suspended by the National Assembly. Prosecutors accuse him of accepting bribes of several billion forints during his ministership. Seszták maintains his innocence. According to Prime Minister Péter Magyar, this is the first time since the 1990 end of communism that a minister has been arrested. During searches as part of the criminal proceedings against him, investigators found $19.5m in cash at secluded locations.

== Personal life ==
Seszták is married, he has two children. His wife, Mariann Seszták-Berecz was owner in three firms in January 2016. The family lived in New Jersey between 2010 and 2011, Miklós Seszták commuted between Hungary and the United States during that period. Seszták is a member of the Hungarian Greek Catholic Church, his brother István Seszták is a member of the church hierarchy.

Seszták also served as President of the Hungarian Chess Federation (MSSZ) from 2011 to 2015. He was replaced by his cousin Tamás Seszták in that position in May 2015. Seszták is also a supporter of local sports clubs, especially football team Várda SE (since 2013: Kisvárda FC). The team received more than one billion forints state aid in 2015 and a new stadium is also built. during Seszták's ministership. Therefore left-wing liberal portal 444.hu compared this case to Puskás Akadémia FC's Pancho Arena which was built just meters away from Prime Minister Viktor Orbán's house in Felcsút.

Political offices
Preceded by Zsuzsanna Németh	Minister of National Development; 2014–2018	Succeeded by Office abolished
