= Dana Kochavi =

Israeli chess player (born 2007)

Personal information
- Native name: דנה כוכבי
- Born: 2007 (age 18–19)

Chess career
- Country: Israel
- Title: FIDE Master (2024); Woman FIDE Master (2023)
- Peak rating: 2362 (December 2024)

Dana Kochavi (Hebrew: דנה כוכבי; born 2007) is an Israeli chess player. She is a FIDE master, having won that title in 2024.

In 2023, she won the title of Woman FIDE master. In September 2024, she competed in the 45th Chess Olympiad, where she won the gold medal for the women's reserve board category, and was the only chess player in the championship to win all her games. At the 2024 European Chess Championship, held in Montenegro, Kochavi won a silver medal. Following her performance in competitions that year, she added 196.4 points to her ranking, reached a ranking of 2362, and was promoted to the rank of FIDE Master.
