= Kevin Cupid =

Trinidadian chess player (born 1991)

Personal information
- Born: July 11, 1991 (age 35)

Chess career
- Country: Trinidad and Tobago
- Title: FIDE Master (2016)
- Peak rating: 2201 (April 2024)

Kevin Cupid is a Trinidadian chess player. He is a national champion of Trinidad and Tobago.

== Chess career ==
Cupid vs. Sedlak, Baku 2016

Position: c6 white king, b5 white pawn, c5 black pawn, a4 black knight, c4 white pawn, g4 black king, a3 black pawn, b3 white bishop

Final position

In September 2016, he defeated grandmaster Nikola Sedlak in an upset in the first round of the 42nd Chess Olympiad. He ended the event with an overall score of 5/10 on board 2.

In July 2017, he won the Trinidad and Tobago National Open Chess Championship with a score of 6.5/7.

In August 2022, he served as the coach for the Trinidad and Tobago women’s team in the 44th Chess Olympiad.

In September 2024, he played for Trinidad and Tobago at the 45th Chess Olympiad, scoring +2=2-4.

In February 2025, he finished in third place at the SITTU Barbados Open Chess Championship Group A.
