= Jan Šubelj =

Slovenian chess grandmaster (born 2004)

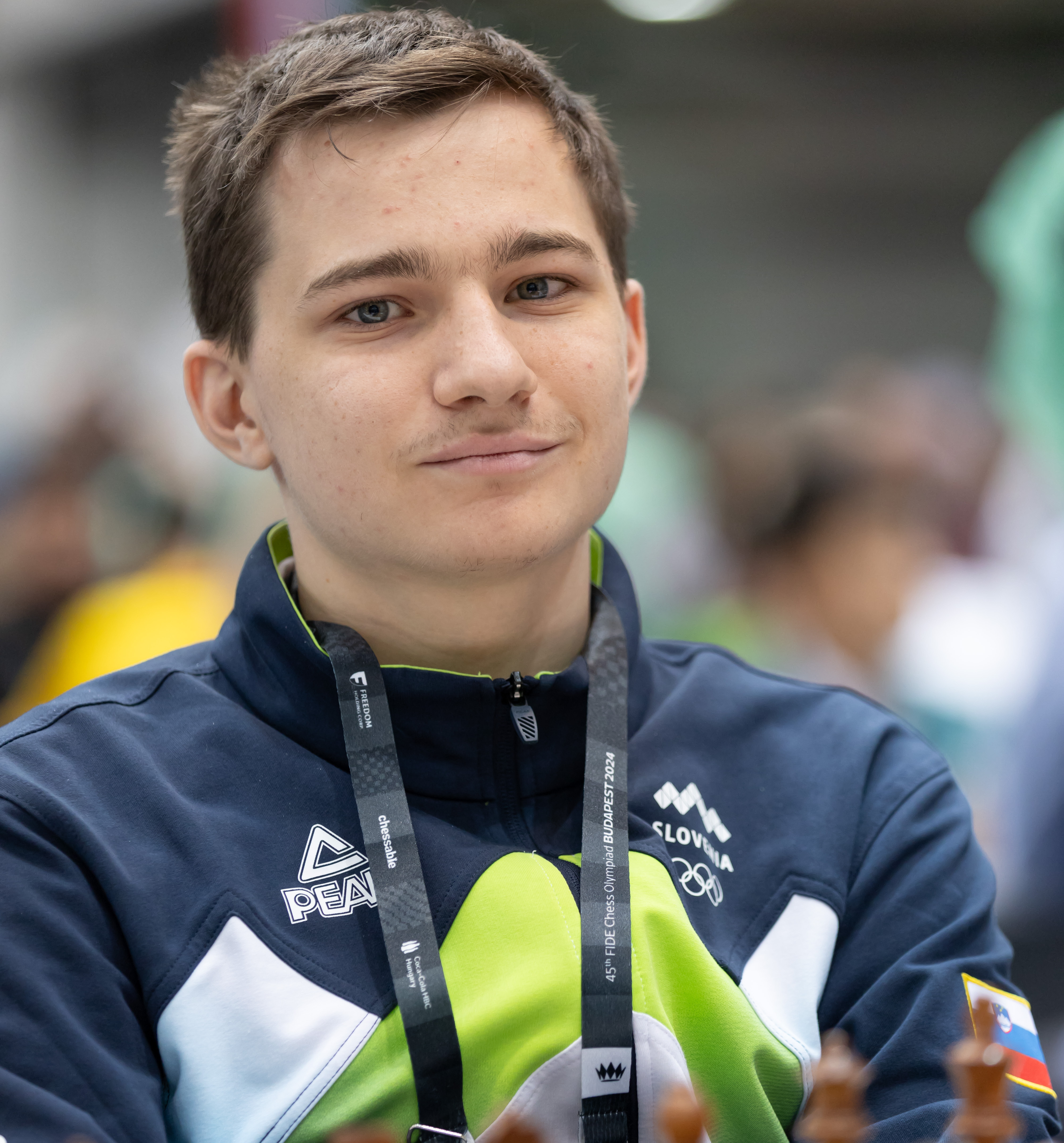
- Šubelj in 2024

Personal information
- Born: September 13, 2004 (age 21) Ljubljana, Slovenia

Chess career
- Country: Slovenia
- Title: Grandmaster (2023)
- FIDE rating: 2565 (July 2026)
- Peak rating: 2565 (June 2026)

Jan Šubelj is a Slovenian chess grandmaster.

== Chess career ==
In July 2020, he gained the International Master title at the St. Veitu Open.

He is the youngest Slovenian grandmaster, having earned his GM norms at the:

- GM Mix Third Saturday in Novi Sad, February 2022
- FE 7 Vergani Cup in Bassano del Grappa, February 2023
- European Individual Chess Championship in Vrnjacka Banja, March 2023

In December 2023, he finished 16th in the European Speed Chess Championship, with a score of 9.5/13.

At the 45th Chess Olympiad in September 2024, he was part of the Slovenian team that finished in 9th place overall.
