= Hungarian Chess Federation =

National organization for chess in Hungary

- Magyar Sakkszövetség
- Formation: 1927; 99 years ago
- Location: Hungary
- Affiliations: FIDE
- Website: www.chess.hu

The Hungarian Chess Federation (Hungarian: Magyar Sakkszövetség, pronounced [ˈmɒɟɒr ˈʃɒkːˈsøvɛt͡ʃːeːɡ] - MSSz) is the national organization for chess in Hungary. It is affiliated to the World Chess Federation and was founded in 1921. The chairman is Miklós Seszták. The Hungarian Chess Federation organizes a Hungarian Chess Championship.

Hungary hosted the 2nd unofficial Chess Olympiad in 1926.

== Organization ==
The board consists of a chairman, a deputy chairman, a secretary and a treasurer. The chairman and the deputy chairman are elected for a 4-year term.

=== Officers ===
- chairman : Zoltán Polyánszky Dr.
- secretary : István Sipos IM

== Hungarian chess players ==
- Péter Lékó, international grandmaster
- Judit Polgar
- Richárd Rapport
- Zoltán Almási
- Ferenc Berkes
