= Matic Lavrenčič =

Slovenian chess player (born 2008)

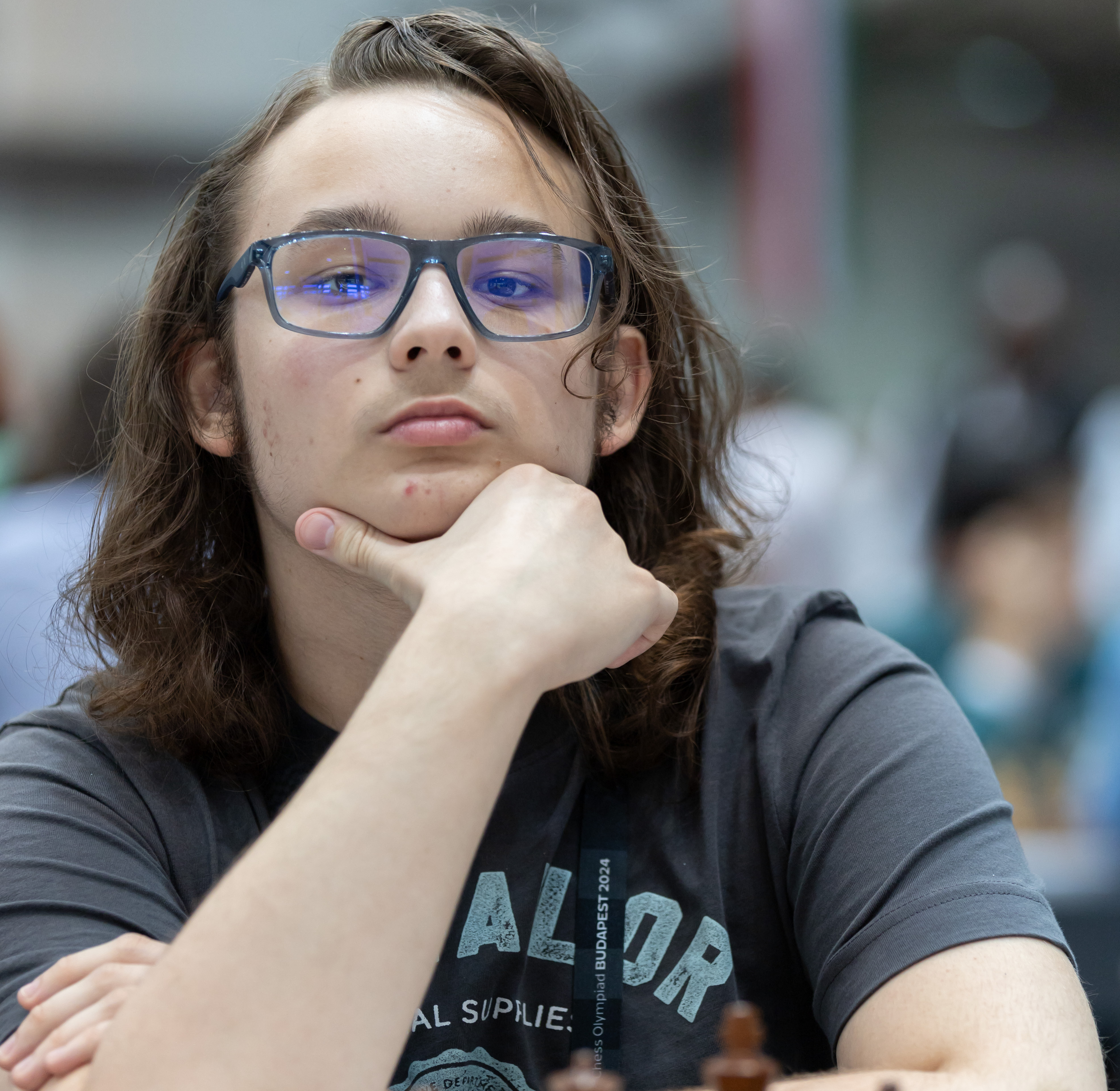

Personal information
- Born: August 26, 2008 (age 18)

Chess career
- Country: Slovenia
- Title: International Master (2025)
- FIDE rating: 2476 (October 2026)
- Peak rating: 2495 (June 2026)

Matic Lavrenčič (born 26 August 2008) is a Slovenian chess player.

== Chess career ==
In January 2020, he won the national U12 championship after going undefeated and only submitting one draw.

In October 2023, he played for his country alongside Maksim Goroškov, Matic Nareks, and Rudi Olenik Čampa at the European Youth Team Championships, helping the team secure the victory.

At the 45th Chess Olympiad in 2024, he was part of the Slovenian team that finished in 9th place overall.

At the FIDE World Youth Rapid & Blitz Championships 2024 Lavrenčič won the category U16.

At the World Junior Chess Championship 2025, he finished at second place by 8.5/11.
