= Thai Dai Van Nguyen =

Czech chess grandmaster (born 2001)

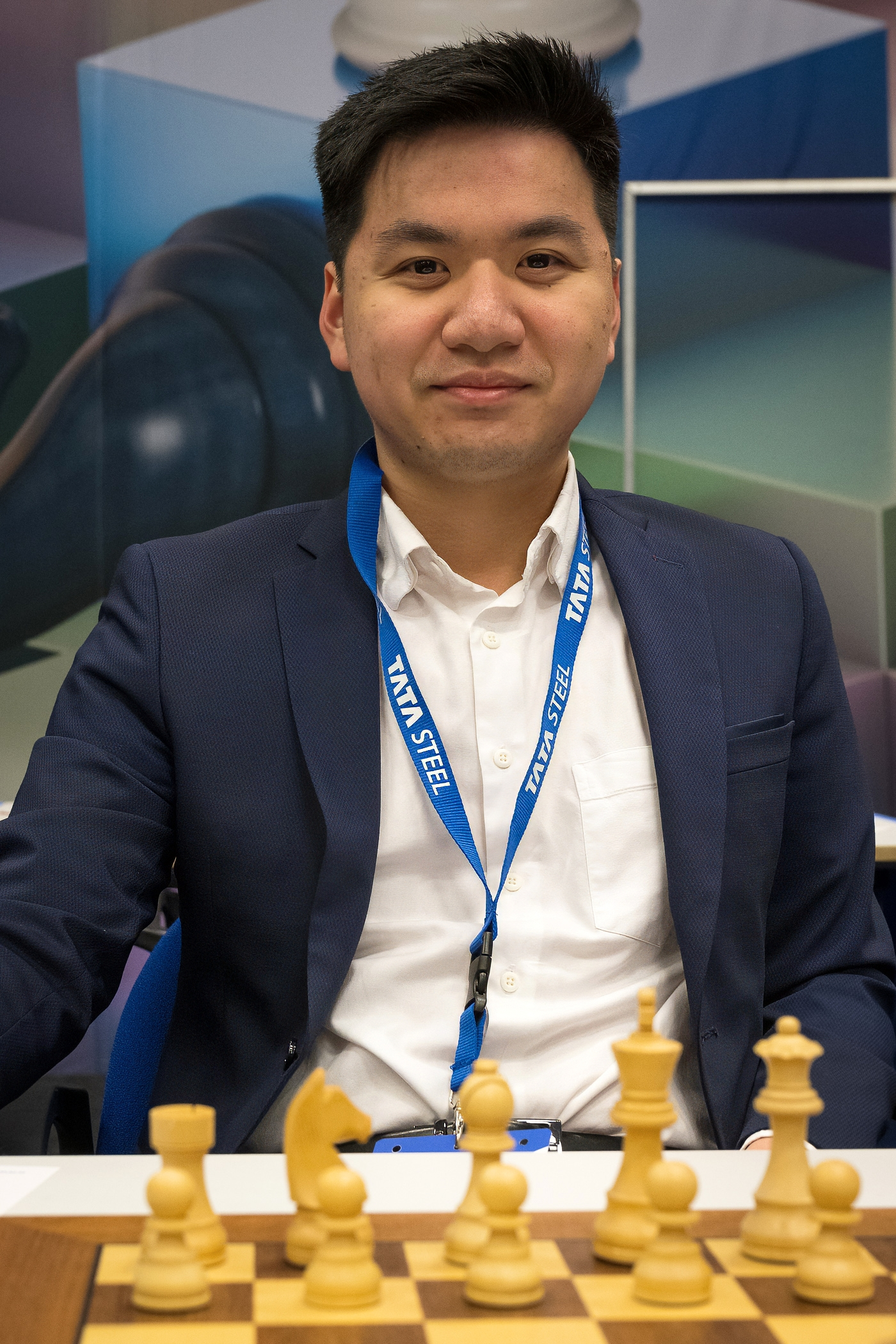
- Thai Dai Van Nguyen in 2025

Personal information
- Born: 12 December 2001 (age 24) Prague, Czech Republic

Chess career
- Country: Czech Republic
- Title: Grandmaster (2018)
- FIDE rating: 2633 (August 2026)
- Peak rating: 2677 (March 2025)
- Ranking: No. 93 (August 2026)
- Peak ranking: No. 46 (March 2025)

Thai Dai Van Nguyen (Note: Vietnamese: Nguyễn Thái Đại Văn) (Note: His first names are Thai Dai Van, but he introduces himself as Van.) (born 12 December 2001) is a Czech chess grandmaster.

== Biography ==
Nguyen's father is a Vietnamese businessman.

In 2011, Nguyen won the Czech Youth Chess Championship in the U10 age group. After that, he twice in a row won the Czech Youth Chess Championship in the U12 age group (2012, 2013).

In 2016, Nguyen was awarded the FIDE International Master (IM) title and received the FIDE Grandmaster (GM) title two years later. At just 16, Nguyen became the youngest chess grandmaster in the Czech Republic.

In 2017, he participated in the Budapest International Chess Tournaments First Saturday, where he won twice. He participated in the European Youth Chess Championships and World Youth Chess Championships in the different age groups. Best result - in 2019, in Bratislava, Nguyen won the European Youth Chess Championship in the U18 section.

Nguyen qualified and played in the Chess World Cup 2021, winning in the first round against Ádám Kozák but getting knocked out in the second round after losing against Andrey Esipenko.

In 2025, Nguyen won the Challengers section of the Tata Steel Chess Tournament 2025. He tied with Azerbaijani grandmaster Aydin Suleymanli for first place in the classical games and won the rapid tiebreaks to qualify to the Masters section of the Tata Steel Chess Tournament 2026.

Nguyen placed last in the aforementioned Tata Steel 2026, and subsequently withdrew from the Prague International Chess Festival for undisclosed reasons.
