= Maria Emelianova =

Russian-English chess player (born 1987

Personal information
- Born: 5 April 1987 (age 39) Yekaterinburg, Sverdlovsk Oblast, Russia

Chess career
- Country: Russia (until 2020); England (2020–2025); Belgium (since 2025)
- Title: Woman FIDE Master (2010)
- Peak rating: 2144 (April 2004)

Kick information
- Channel: MashaD4
- Years active: 2024–present
- Genre: Gaming
- Game: Chess
- Followers: 7.1 thousand (31 May 2025)

Twitch information
- Channel: MashaD4
- Years active: 2019–present
- Genre: Gaming
- Game: Chess
- Followers: 29.0 thousand

Maria Emelianova (born 5 April 1987) is a Russian-born Belgian chess player, photographer, and streamer who holds the FIDE title of Woman FIDE Master (WFM). She has a peak FIDE rating of 2144. She is the official photographer for Chess.com.

In 2025, Emelianova transferred to the Royal Belgian Chess Federation.
