= Matej Šebenik =

Slovenian chess grandmaster (born 1983)

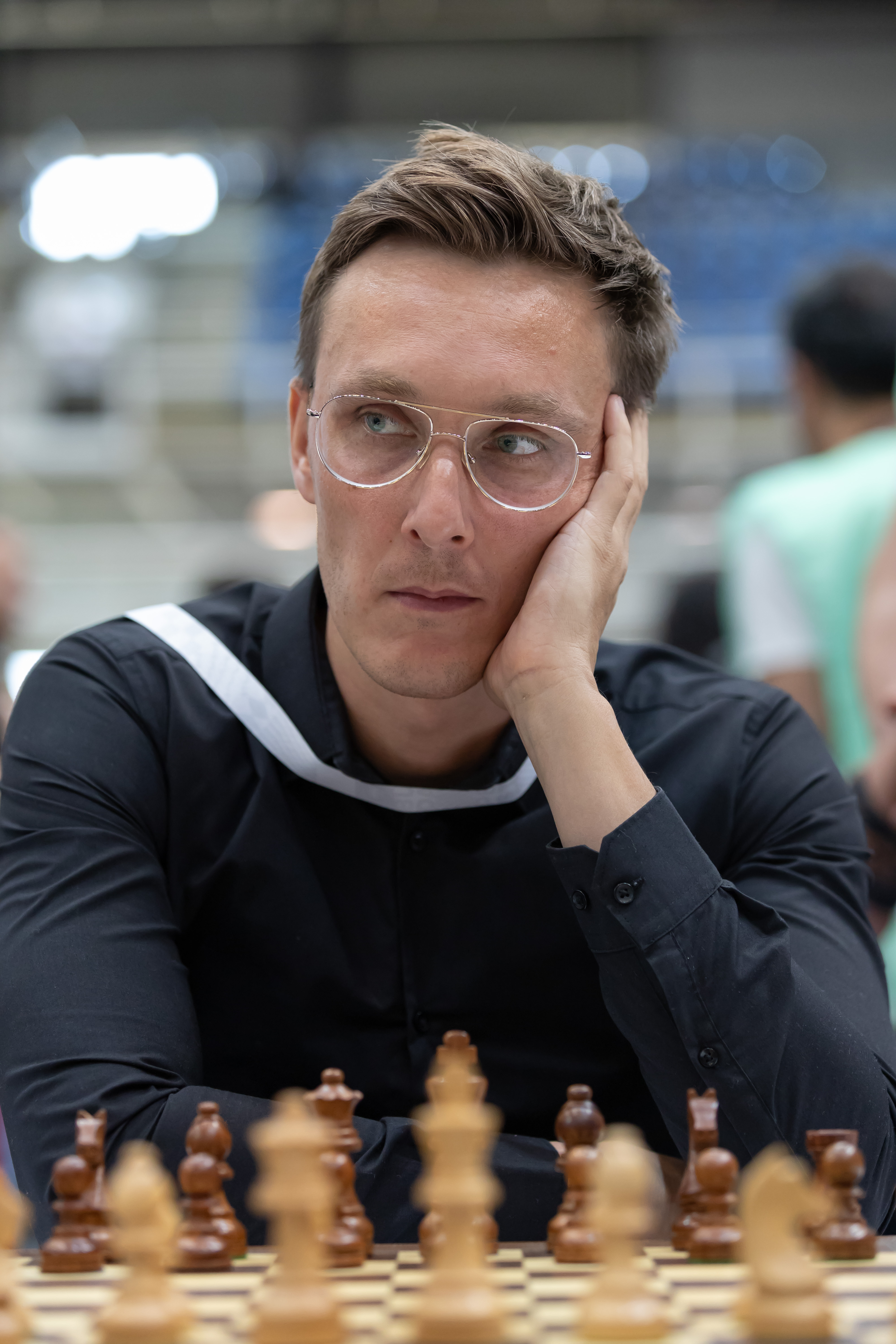
- Budapest 2024

Personal information
- Born: 28 August 1983 (age 42) Ljubljana, Slovenia

Chess career
- Country: Slovenia
- Title: Grandmaster (2012)
- FIDE rating: 2483 (July 2026)
- Peak rating: 2573 (May 2012)

Matej Šebenik (born 28 August 1983) is a Slovenian chess player. He was awarded the title of Grandmaster (GM) by FIDE in 2012. He won the Slovenian Chess Championship in 2014. In 2009, he won the San Sebastián tournament.

Šebenik has played for team Slovenia in the Chess Olympiad, European Team Chess Championship, Mitropa Cup and European Youth Team Championship. His team won the gold medal in the 2005 Mitropa Cup.
