= Aydin Suleymanli =

Azerbaijani chess grandmaster (born 2005)

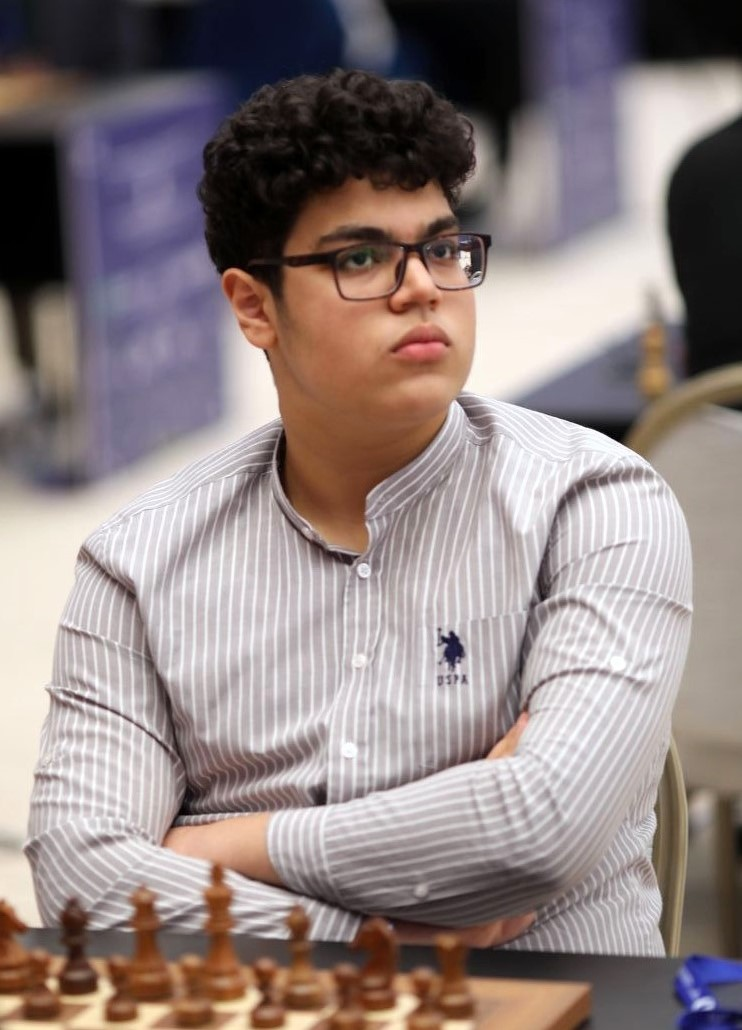

Personal information
- Born: March 22, 2005 (age 21) Baku, Azerbaijan

Chess career
- Country: Azerbaijan
- Title: Grandmaster (2021)
- FIDE rating: 2679 (October 2026)
- Peak rating: 2692 (November 2026)
- Ranking: No. 41 (October 2026)
- Peak ranking: No. 36 (November 2026)

Aydin Suleymanli (Azerbaijani: Aydın Süleymanlı; born 22 March 2005) is an Azerbaijani chess grandmaster.

== Biography ==
Aydin Suleymanli repeatedly represented Azerbaijan at the European Youth Chess Championships and World Youth Chess Championships in different age groups, where he won three gold medals: in 2013, in Budva at the European Youth Chess Championship in the U08 age group and was awarded the Candidate Master (CM) title, In 2017, he won the European Youth Chess Championship in the U12 age group in Mamaia and was awarded the title of FIDE Master (FM).

In 2014, at Tallinn, he won the European Youth Chess Championships in blitz and rapid in the U10 age group.

In 2019, he won the World Youth Chess Championship in the O14 age group.

In February 2020, Suleymanli finished first in the Aeroflot Open. In 2021, he won the Niksic Memorial with a score of 8/9. In the 8th round of the competition, he won against a local chess player Luka Drašković. Due to this victory, at the age of 16, he became the 27th grandmaster of Azerbaijan.

In December 2023, he won the rapid section of the Vugar Gashimov Memorial 2023 super tournament by scoring 11 points.

== Personal life ==
His current coach is GM Farid Abbasov.
