= List of chess organizations =

List of organizations specializing in chess

This is a list of chess organizations. Chess is played all over the world. The dominant international governing body of chess is FIDE, which confers titles and conducts world championship tournaments.

The first Official World Championship was held in 1886, and there has always been at least one world champion since then. From 1993 to 2008, there were always two champions from rival organizations.

The dominant correspondence chess organization is the International Correspondence Chess Federation (ICCF).

== International ==
- FIDE (International Chess Federation or World Chess Federation)
- Association of Chess Professionals
- Professional Chess Association
- International Braille Chess Association
- Grand Slam Chess Association
- International Correspondence Chess Federation
- Internationaler Fernschachbund

=== Chess boxing ===
- World Chess Boxing Organisation
- World Chess Boxing Association

== Americas ==
- Confederation of Chess for America

=== United States of America ===
- Academic Chess
- America's Foundation for Chess
- United States Chess Federation
  - Alaska Chess Federation
  - Colorado State Chess Association
  - Florida Chess Association
  - Idaho Chess Association
  - Nebraska State Chess Association
  - Silver State Chess Association
  - New York State Chess Association
  - Pennsylvania State Chess Federation
  - Utah Chess Association
  - Wyoming Chess Association
  - World Chess Hall of Fame
- United States Chess League
- US Chess Center
- Professional Rapid Online Chess League
- Collins Kids organization
- The Gift of Chess
- American Chess Association

=== Canada ===
- Chess Federation of Canada
- Chess'n Math Association
- Manitoba Chess Association

== South America ==
- Argentine Chess Federation
- Belize National Youth Chess Foundation
- Brazilian Chess Confederation
- Dominica Chess Federation
- Guyana Chess Federation
- Uruguayan Chess Federation
- Haitian Chess Federation

== Asia ==
- Asian Chess Federation

=== China ===
- Chinese Chess Association

=== Bangladesh ===
- Bangladesh Chess Federation

=== Hong Kong ===
- Hong Kong Chess Federation

=== Japan ===
- Japan Chess Association

=== Singapore ===
- Singapore Chess Federation

=== Malaysia ===
- Malaysian Chess Federation

=== Pakistan ===
- Chess Federation of Pakistan

=== Philippines ===
- National Chess Federation of the Philippines
- Professional Chess Association of the Philippines

=== Qatar ===
- Qatar Chess Association

=== India ===
- All India Chess Federation
  - All India Chess Federation for the Blind
  - All Assam Chess Association
  - All Tripura Chess Association
  - Bengal Chess Association
  - Chess Players Association of India
  - Goa State Chess Association
  - Maharashtra Chess Association
  - South Kanara District Chess Association
  - Tamil Nadu State Chess Association
  - West Bengal Chess Association
- Goodricke National Chess Academy
- Mind Champions Academy

=== Taiwan ===
- Chinese Taipei Chess Association

=== UAE ===
- UAE Chess Federation
- Dubai Chess and Culture Club
- Arab Chess Federation

== Europe ==
- European Chess Union
- Chess Federation of Armenia
- Austrian Chess Federation
- Azerbaijan Chess Federation
- Bulgarian Chess Federation
- Croatian Chess Federation
- English Chess Federation
- French Chess Federation
- German Chess Federation
- Hungarian Chess Federation
- Irish Chess Union
- Italian Chess Federation
- Malta Chess Federation
- Royal Dutch Chess Federation
- Norwegian Chess Federation
- Polish Chess Federation
- Portuguese Chess Federation
- Chess Scotland
- Turkish Chess Federation
- Welsh Chess Union

=== Societies and companies ===
- British Chess Problem Society
- Berlin Pleiades
- British Chess Variants Society
- Play Magnus Group
- ChessBase

=== Swedan ===
- Swedish Chess Federation
- Swedish Chess Computer Association

=== Russia ===
- Chess Federation of Russia
- USSR Chess Federation

== Africa ==
- African Chess Union
  - Chess Federation of Zambia
  - Chess South Africa
  - Uganda Chess Federation
- Chess in Slums Africa
- Botswana Chess Federation
- Ethiopia Chess Federation

== Oceania ==
- Oceania Chess Confederation

=== Australia ===
- Australian Chess Federation
- Chess Kids

=== New Zealand ===
- New Zealand Chess Federation

=== Fiji ===
- Fiji Chess Federation
