= Chess in Canada =

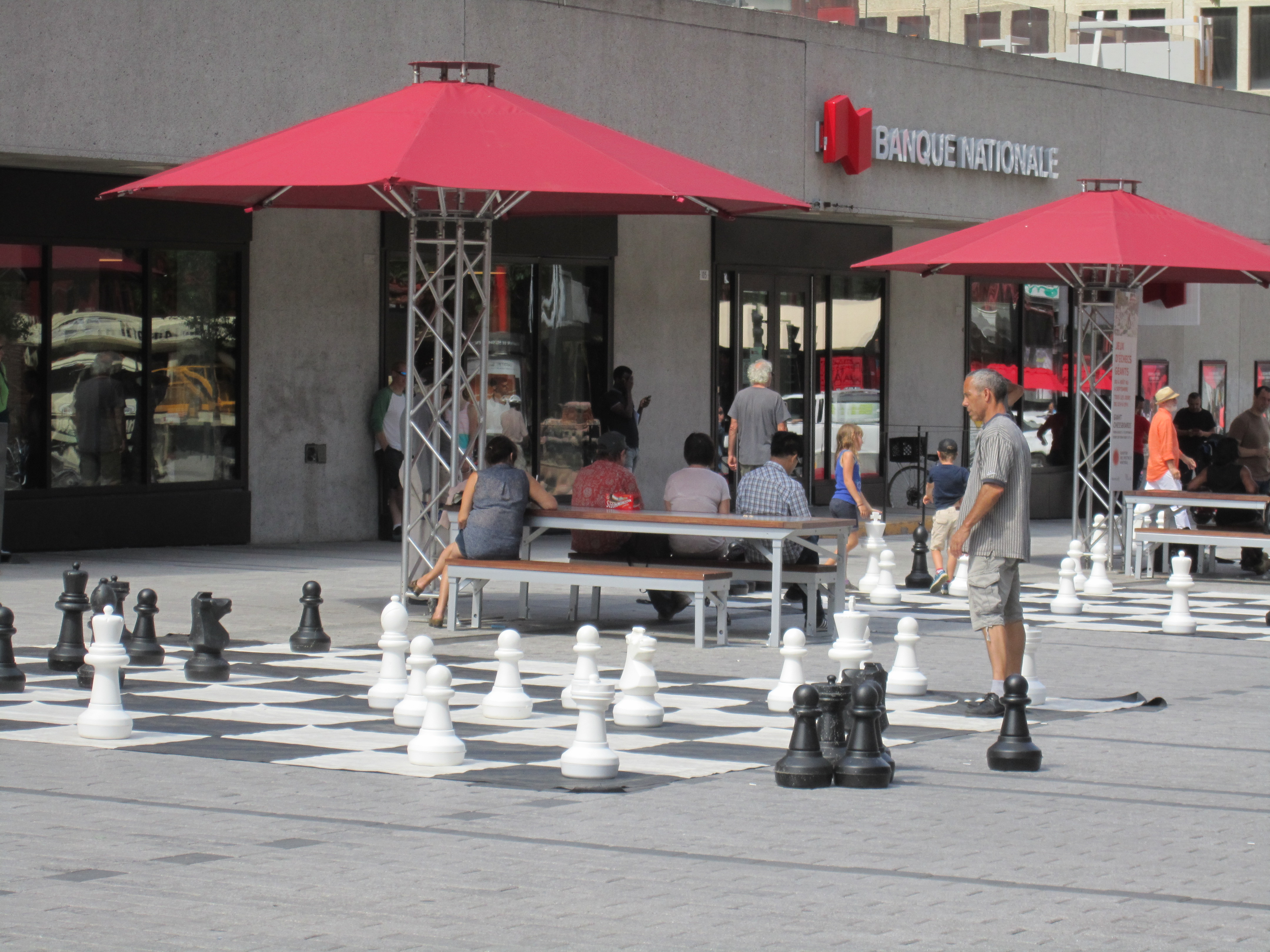
A giant chess set in Montreal

Organized gameplay of chess in Canada began in 1844, when the country's first club was founded in Montreal, Quebec. The Canadian Chess Association was founded in Hamilton, Ontario in 1872, which was later renamed to the Canadian Chess Federation in 1932 and later in 1945 the Chess Federation of Canada (French: Fédération canadienne des échecs). As of 2024, the CFC has over 2,500 members.

Notable tournaments hosted regularly in Canada include the Canadian Open, which has seen various non-Canadian players play including Boris Spassky, Paul Keres, Bobby Fischer, Bent Larsen, Alexei Shirov, and Vasyl Ivanchuk. The Canadian Chess Championship and the Canadian Women's Chess Championship are closed to only Canadian players, unlike the Canadian Open, and winners advance to the FIDE Chess World Cup. Canada has regularly sent men's and women's teams to Chess Olympiads. The Chess'n Math Association is a non-profit aimed to further the representation of chess within Canadian schools.

Canada has also hosted various one-off tournaments of global relevance. The World Chess Championship 1894 between Wilhelm Steinitz and Emanuel Lasker was contested in Montreal from games 12 to 19. In 1957, Toronto hosted the World Junior Chess Championship, which was won by William Lombardy. In 1971, Fischer defeated Mark Taimanov 6–0 in a Candidates qualification match in Vancouver, British Columbia. In 1975, Keres won the Vancouver Open, and while flying home, died during a stopover in Helsinki, Finland. The Paul Keres Memorial is hosted in both Vancouver and Keres' home country Estonia. Most recently, Toronto hosted the Candidates Tournament 2024, with eight competitors of five nationalities, resulting in its winner Gukesh D qualifying to play the World Chess Championship 2024.

== Publications ==
English

- Canadian Chess Review
- CHECK!
- En Passant
- Toronto Chess News

French

- Apprenti sorcier
- Au nom du Roi
- Bulletin de la Ligue d'Échecs de la Mauricie
- Échecs Montréal
- Hébert Parle Échecs
- Québecéchecs
- Spéchecs: Bulletin du club Le Specialiste des échecs

== Notable players ==
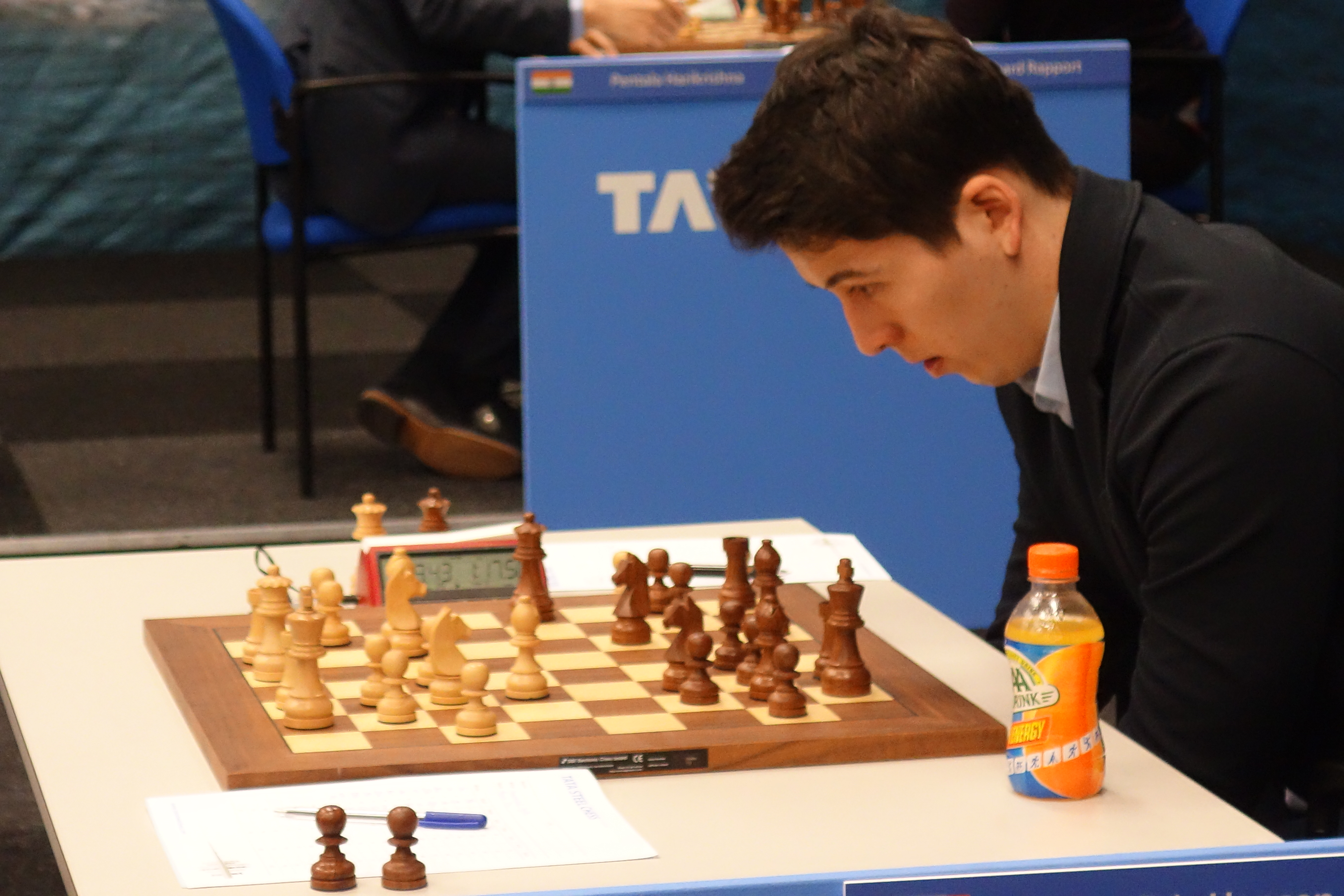
Canadian Grandmaster Eric Hansen

- Daniel Yanofsky (1925–2000), Ukrainian-Canadian and both Canada's first grandmaster and the first grandmaster of the Commonwealth of Nations
- Duncan Suttles (1945-), Canada's second grandmaster and noted practitioner of unorthodox openings like the Modern Defense
- Peter Biyiasas (1950-), Greek-Canadian, Canada's third grandmaster, and frequent training partner of Bobby Fischer
- Kevin Spraggett (1954-), Canada's first Canadian-born grandmaster, Canada's highest-rated grandmaster with a peak rating of 2633 FIDE, and the only Canadian to have ever qualified for the Candidates Tournament
- Evgeny Bareev (1966-), Russian-Canadian grandmaster and 2002 winner of the Tata Steel Chess Tournament who represented Russia until 2015 prior to switching federations to Canada
- Alexandre Lesiège (1975-), grandmaster and frequent member of the Canadian Chess Olympiad team
- Dimitri Tyomkin (1977-), Israeli-Canadian grandmaster and European Junior Chess Champion before switching to represent Canada in 2002
- Mark Bluvshtein (1988-), Soviet-born grandmaster who played for Israel before playing for Canada and becoming the country's youngest grandmaster at 16
- Pascal Charbonneau (1983-), grandmaster
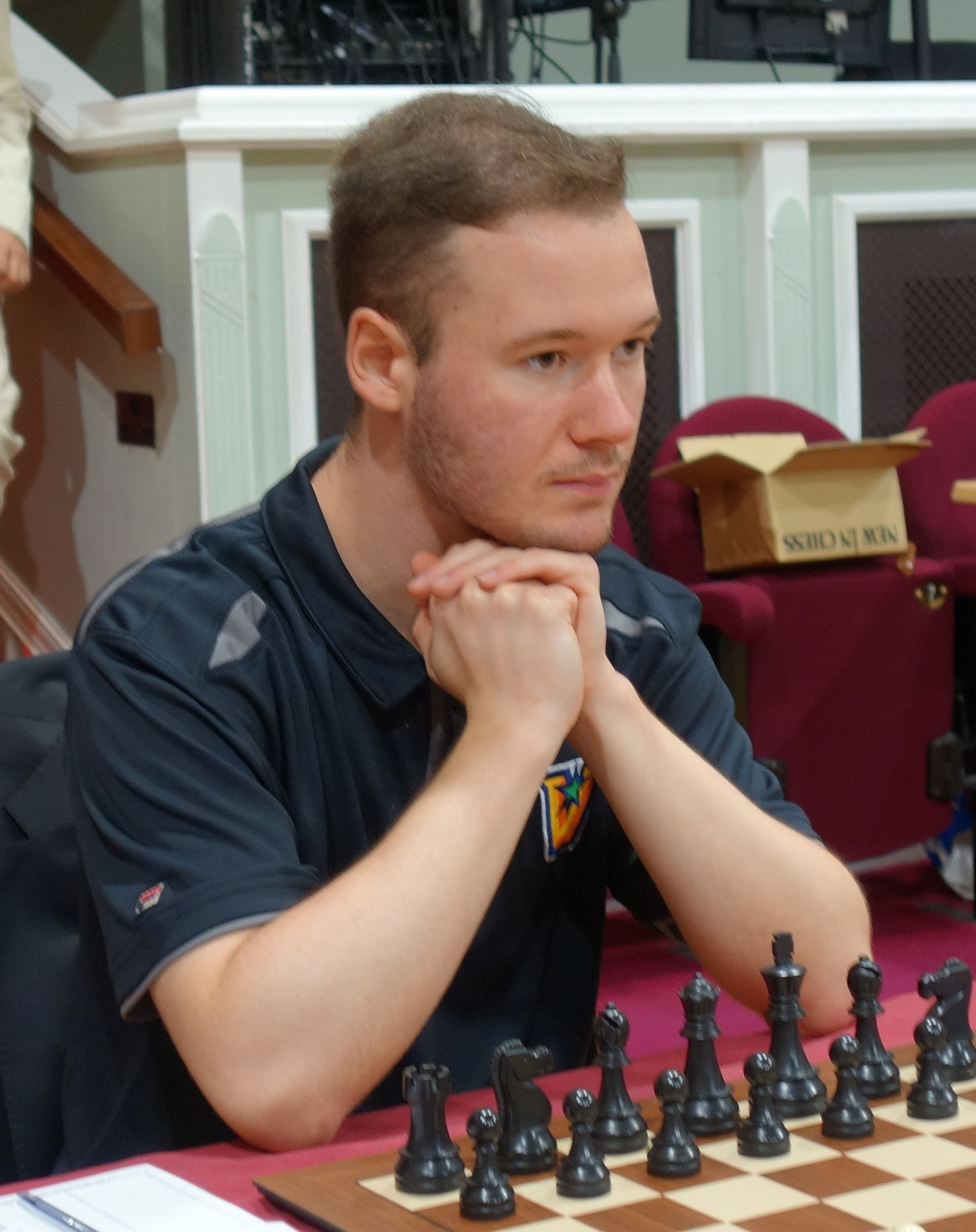
  Shawn Rodrigue-Lemieux, Canadian and 2022 World Junior Champion
- Bator Sambuev (1980-), Russian-Canadian grandmaster
- Anton Kovalyov (1992-), Ukrainian-born grandmaster who represented Argentina until 2013 and Canada since
- Thomas Roussel-Roozmon (1988-), grandmaster
- Eric Hansen (1992-), American-Canadian grandmaster and host of the "Chessbrah" chess channel alongside fellow Canadian GM Aman Hambleton
- Razvan Preotu (1999-), grandmaster
- Aman Hambleton (1992-), grandmaster and host of the "Chessbrah" chess channel alongside fellow Canadian GM Eric Hansen who has notably chessboxed IM Lawrence Trent
- Yang Kaiqi (1988-), Chinese-Canadian grandmaster
- Shawn Rodrigue-Lemieux (2004-), Canada's most recent grandmaster and 2022 World Under 18 Chess Championship winner

== See also ==
- Chess Federation of Canada
- Canadian Chess Championship
