= WBCA =

WBCA may refer to:

- Washington's Birthday Celebration
- Women's Basketball Coaches Association
- West Bengal Chess Association
- WBCA-LP, a low-power radio station (102.9 FM) licensed to serve Boston, Massachusetts, United States
- WBCA (New York), a defunct radio station (101.1 FM) which was deleted in 1952
- WTOF a Bay Minette, Alabama radio station (1110 AM) which held the WBCA call sign from 1957–2006
- Wild Bird Conservation Act
