= Sacred Heart School (Saratoga, California) =

Location
- 13718 Saratoga Avenue silicon valley Saratoga, Santa Clara County, California 95070; United States
- Coordinates: 37°16′04″N 122°01′03″W

Information
- Funding type: Tuition-based
- Religious affiliation: Catholic
- Denomination: Roman Catholic
- Established: 1957
- Founder: Sisters of Notre Dame de Namur
- Principal: Thomas Pulchny
- Grades: Pre K - 8th
- Enrollment: ~250
  - Grade 7: 37
  - Grade 8: 36
- Average class size: max 36
- Language: English and Spanish
- Hours in school day: 8:00-3:00 Wednesdays 8:00-12:30
- Campus size: 11+ Acres
- Colors: red, blue and white
- Slogan: Faith, Service and Academic Excellence
- Mascot: Mustang
- Team name: Mustangs
- Information: (408) 867-9241
- Website: school.sacredheartsaratoga.org

Sacred Heart School in Saratoga, California, USA is a private co-educational Roman Catholic school. The school grades range from pre-school for 4–5 year olds through junior high school (8th grade). The school is attached to Sacred Heart Church which was the first Roman Catholic church in Saratoga. Both the school and church are attached to the Diocese of San Jose. The current principal of Sacred Heart is Thomas Pulchny, a Canadian bagpipe player, and current enrollment is approximately 250 students. The school's colors are red, blue and white and its mascot is the Mustang.

== History ==
Sacred Heart School was founded in 1957 after Sacred Heart Parish moved from what is now downtown Saratoga to the school's current location on Saratoga Avenue. The school opened its doors in 1957 as a 4-grade school to address the growing need for a Catholic school in the area. However the school was quickly expanded both physically and in the number of grades to incorporate K–8 educational levels to serve the community needs. It would remain as such until the school was further expanded in 2000 with the addition of the Pre-K program. The average class size of Sacred Heart is 26 in a home room class.

Sacred Heart accepts Catholics and non-Catholics. Subjects taught include all state mandated subjects such as Social Studies, Math, and Religious Studies. Other programs offered by specialty teachers are Spanish, Music, P.E., Art, Science, and Math. Students in the 2nd grade who are Catholic participate in the sacraments first communion and first reconciliation. Students who reach the 8th grade and are Catholic participate in the sacrament of Confirmation.

Student Council is also available to those who choose to run for a position. The school offers opportunities for the students to participate in community service programs throughout the year. Extra-curricular classes such as piano, art, academic chess, robotics, league sports, choir and altar service are offered after school.

All students are required to wear uniforms. Boys generally wear red polo shirts with blue pants while girls wear plaid jumpers and in the junior high grades, skirts. In the late 1990s students were ordered to wear school-specific exercise clothes for physical education as well.

In addition to the primary school building, Sacred Heart includes Geary Hall, originally used as the church building proper before the addition of the current church building. Geary Hall now serves as the school's gym/theater for sports including Basketball, Volleyball as well as physical education classes and Movement and Lab. Other league sports students can participate in are flag football, softball, volleyball, and track.

During the renovation and rebuilding of the neighboring public library, the school leased part of its playground to house a temporary library in trailers so that the library was not forced to close completely during the renovation. This greatly reduced the amount of space for students to utilize during recess times, however it was deemed a worthy compromise for the community.

The Diocese of San Jose, being a relatively young diocese, recently underwent its first transition of power from one bishop to his successor in 1998–1999. The diocese first bishop, Pierre DuMaine, and his successor, Patrick Joseph McGrath. Bishop McGrath chose Sacred Heart as his temporary residence during the transition period when both DuMaine and himself were co-bishops of the diocese.

Sacred Heart was also going to be one of the first schools to utilize solar power to provide 50+ kilowatts of power to power the school as part of the statewide clean energy program. Unfortunately budget shortfalls in the Diocese of San Jose ended the project before it could be completed.
