= Millennium Hotel =

Millennium Hotel may refer to any of several hotels operated by Millennium & Copthorne Hotels, including:

== United States ==
- Millennium Alaskan Hotel, Anchorage, US
- Millennium Biltmore Hotel, Los Angeles, US
- Millennium Hotel St. Louis, US
- Millennium Hilton New York One UN Plaza, New York City, US
- Millennium Downtown New York Hotel, New York City, US (owned by Hilton Worldwide)
- Millennium Times Square New York

== Other countries ==
- Millennium Hotel Mayfair, London, UK
- Millennium Madejski Hotel, Reading, UK
- Millennium Hotel Taichung, Taiwan
- Grand Millennium Hotel, one of the tallest buildings in Amman, Jordan
