= ATCA =

ATCA may refer to:

- Atça, a town in Turkey
- Advanced Telecommunications Computing Architecture, a specification for communications equipment
- Aid to the civil authority, military aid to the civil power
- Alien Tort Claims Act, a U.S. statue on jurisdiction
- All Tripura Chess Association, an Indian organisation
- American Theatre Critics Association
- Association of Turkish Cypriots Abroad
- Australia Telescope Compact Array, a radio telescope in New South Wales
