= AACA =

AACA may refer to:

- AACA Museum in Hershey, Pennsylvania
- All Assam Chess Association
- American Association of Clinical Anatomists
- American Anti-Corruption Act
- American Assets Capital Advisers, investment management company, based in San Diego, California
