= Yang Kaiqi =

Chinese-Canadian chess grandmaster (born 1988)

Personal information
- Born: 6 May 1988 (age 38) Heilongjiang, China

Chess career
- Country: China (until 2017); Canada (since 2017)
- Title: Grandmaster (2019)
- FIDE rating: 2481 (July 2026)
- Peak rating: 2505 (March 2019)

Yang Kaiqi (born 6 May 1988 in Heilongjiang Province) is a Chinese-Canadian chess Grandmaster, who won the First (Hi Seoul) Korea Open Chess tournament held at the Olympic Parktel Convention Center, Seoul (from 29 November – 6 December 2008). This is the strongest chess tournament ever held in South Korea.

In 2008, Yang has also played at the 3rd PGMA Cup, at the Aeroflot Open, and at the Malaysian Open.

In 2015 he shared first place in the 46th National Chess Congress in Philadelphia, finishing ahead of strong Grandmasters such as Gata Kamsky and Sergey Erenburg. He is now based in Canada, and shared second place behind GM Evgeny Bareev in the 2015 "Chess to Remember" tournament in Toronto held to mark the 100th anniversary of the Armenian genocide.

In August 2017, he transferred to the Chess Federation of Canada.

In March 2019, he came first at GM Round Robin Paracin, Serbia, clinching his grandmaster title.
