= Chess in Florida =

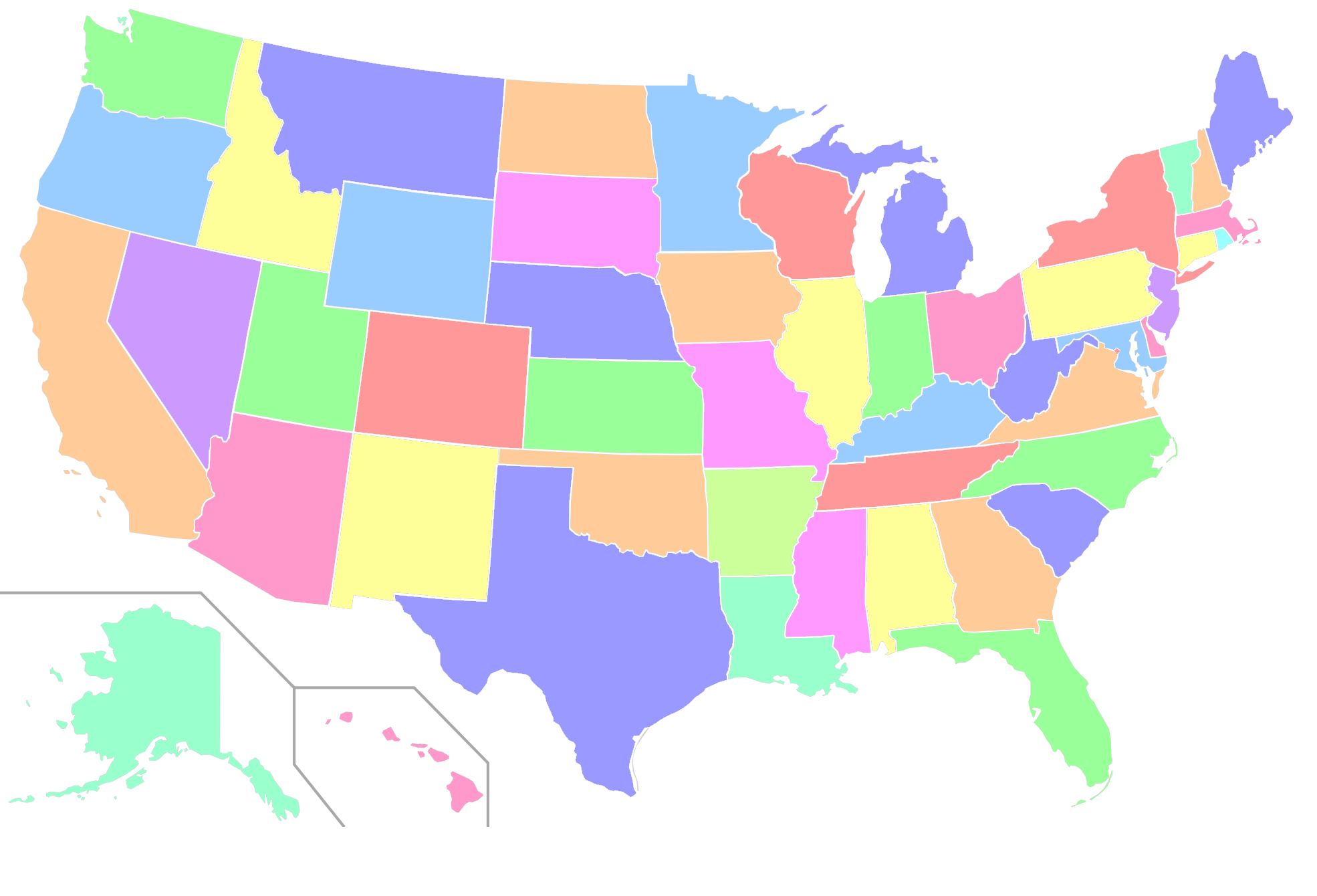
- Top Player: Fabiano Caruana (2862 USCF, 2784 FIDE)
- Champion: Bach Ngo
- USCF Affiliate: Florida Chess Association
- Active Players: 3874

As of August 2025, Florida has 3874 active players registered with the United States Chess Federation. The current USCF Florida state affiliate is the Florida Chess Association.

== History ==
The Florida Chess Association was established in 1939.

=== Panhandle ===
In 2011, the Robert L. Froemke Memorial tournament was established as an annual tournament. The 2011 tournament was the first chess tournament in Tallahassee in over 11 years. The last time the tournament was held was in 2014.

On December 1, 2018, the Tallahassee School of Math and Science hosted the first chess tournament in Tallahassee since 2014.

In March 2025, the Challenger Learning Center of Tallahassee hosted the Tallahassee Chess Fest. The event began with a Friday evening screening of Searching for Bobby Fischer. On Saturday, attendees could visit interactive chess sessions, a simultaneous exhibition, and a grandmaster showdown—a match between grandmasters Julio Becerra and Nikola Mitkov. Audience members to the grandmaster showdown were given headphones, which they could use to listen to commentary or classical music. On Sunday, the event hosted tournaments in quick chess and blitz. The Chest Fest ended with a planetarium show.

Florida A&M University has a competitive chess team that has grown exponentially in recent years. In April 2025, the FAMU Chess Club sent 10 student to the HBCU Chess Tournament at Morehouse College. The Chess Club Advisor is Dr. Daaim Shabazz, who was named 2025 Chess Educator of the Year by the University of Texas-Dallas Chess Program. Dr. Shabazz is the creator of an online chess magazine called The Chess Drum, which launched in 2001.

=== Jacksonville ===
In 1990, Jacksonville hosted the 91st U.S. Open Chess Championship.

In 1999, ScholasticChess.org hosted the first annual Jacksonville City Scholastic Championship. The tournament is four rounds long.

In 2014, Kevin Pryor revived the Jacksonville Chess Club. This effort revitalized chess in Northeast Florida. Pryor would receive a commendation from the city for his work 10 years later, in late September 2025.

=== North central Florida ===
Gator Chess Club
- Type: University Chess Club
- Location: Gainesville, Florida
- Country: United States
- Affiliation: University of Florida
- Website: Official Website

The Gator Chess Club at the University of Florida meets weekly.

On October 24, 2024, IM Levy Rozman (AKA GothamChess) visited UF. Rozman returned the following year on September 28, 2024. At the school, Rozman gave a one-hour lecture, a Q&A session, and played five blitz games against random attendees.

=== Central Florida ===
Central Florida hosts numerous national tournaments. Orlando hosted the U.S. Open Chess Championship in 2011, 2014, and 2019. Additionally, Kissimmee was the site of the 98th U.S. Open in 1997.

The Orlando Chess Open is a tournament held annually in August.

=== Suncoast ===
Saint Petersburg Chess Club
- Type: Regional Chess Club
- Founded: 1930
- Location: St. Petersburg, Florida
- Country: United States
- Website: Official Website; Legacy Website

In the early 1930s, the St. Pete Chess Club was established at a cottage in St. Petersburg. The St. Pete Chess Club is the oldest chess club in the United States that hasn't relocated. Some grandmasters who've played at the club include Sammy Reshevsky, Bobby Fischer, and Larry Christiansen.

Tampa hosted the 53rd U.S. Open Chess Championship in 1952.

In September 2014, the Tampa Bay Times published an article about the Knights of Knowledge Chess Club. The club would meet in Bay Vista Park in St. Petersburg.

=== South Florida ===
In 1989, Antonis Loudaros founded the first chess program in Palm Beach County at Elbridge Gale Elementary School in Wellington.

Hollywood was the site of the 86th annual US Open in 1985. Fort Lauderdale hosted the 105th US Open in 2004.

In 2013, Franklin Academy Boynton Beach (FABB) opened as the largest charter school in Palm Beach County. One of the mandatory classes at the school is chess. The establishment of the campus was funded with help from tennis player Andre Agassi. During a chess class, Agassi asked students to explain the role of different chess pieces, including a pawn. Starting in the 2014–15 school year, FABB would host an annual grand prix series of tournaments. In April 2015, the FABB chess team sent four chess players to the 2015 Junior High School Nationals. That same month, the school's chess coach Steve Abrahams wrote an article in the Chess Life magazine encouraging other schools to begin chess clubs of their own.

In September 2015, NM Jeff Haskel opened the Boca Chess Center.

In 2016, Antonis Loudaros retired from the Palm Beach County School District and launched a chess program at The Greene School, a private school launched by billionaire Jeff Greene. Under Loudaros' direction, the school's chess team won seven consecutive district championships.

FAU Chess Club
- Type: University Chess Club
- Founded: 2009
- Location: Boca Raton, Florida
- Country: United States
- Affiliation: Florida Atlantic University
- Website: University Webpage; Instagram

Florida Atlantic University has a chess club that meets weekly. In March 2016, the University Press posted a Weekly Spotlight article about the club. As of the publishing of the article, the Boca Raton Chess Club would help host a weekly Swiss tournament on the FAU campus.

In 2022, the FTX Crypto Cup esports chess tournament was hosted at the Eden Roc hotel in Miami Beach. This was a round-robin tournament where players would face a new opponent each day. Each match consisted of 4 rapid games, with blitz tiebreakers. Magnus Carlsen won first place with 16/21 points.

On Chess Day 2022, the West Palm Beach Downtown Development Authority launched opened Fern Street Chess Park. One club that regularly plays in the park is West Palm Street Chess.

In July 2024, Shama Yisrael became the first African-American woman to achieve the USCF National Master title. Yisrael achieved the title at the Pinecrest Independence Open, surpassing a USCF rating of 2200 after defeating Frank Castillo.

In January 2026, Antonis Loudaros received a $2,000 grant from the USCF to promote chess to girls ages 5 to 11 around Palm Beach County. Regarding the grant, Loudaros told Palm Beach Daily News, "I see a void, and this grant can help attract more girls and young women to this project."

=== Florida Keys ===
Chess activity in the Florida Keys has generally been smaller and more community-based than in Florida’s larger metropolitan areas. The Florida Keys chess scene has included library chess clubs, youth programming, casual play, and occasional rated events.

As of September 2009, the Caribbean Club in Key Largo had a free pool and chess night every Monday.

In September 2018, the First Annual Frederick Douglass Memorial Tournament took place at the Blue Flamingo Resort in Key West. The event featured simultaneous exhibitions with GM Maurice Ashley and WGM Nazí Paikidze. Proceeds from their simultaneous exhibitions went to Florida Keys SPCA and Zonta International of Key West. The tournament was a USCF Grand Prix event

The Key West Library Chess Club meets every Saturday.

== Competitors ==
As of August 2025, the following people are the top rated active USCF players from Florida:

Position	Name	USCF Rating	USCF Titles
1	Fabiano Caruana	2862	Original Life Master, National Master, Life Senior Master (norms-based)
2	Carissa Shiwen Yip	2540	Original Life Master, National Master, Life Senior Master (norms-based)
3	Henry Soto Hernandez	2512	National Master, Candidate Master (norms-based)
4	Julio J Becerra	2506	Original Life Master, National Master, Life Senior Master (norms-based)
5	Jorge Leon Oquendo	2501	National Master, Life Master (norms-based)
6	John Gabriel Ludwig	2469	Original Life Master, National Master, Life Master (norms-based)
7	Renier González	2464	Original Life Master, National Master, Life Senior Master (norms-based)
8	Nikola Mitkov	2463	Original Life Master, National Master, Life Senior Master (norms-based)
9	Yans Richard Girones Barrios	2463	National Master, Life Master (norms-based)
10	Bach Ngo	2448	Original Life Master, National Master, Life Master (norms-based)

Other top Idaho chess players who aren't currently active USCF members include IM Hao Yin (2637 Rating), GM Lars Hansen (2627 Rating), and IM Javid Maharramzade (2619 Rating).

== List of state champions (1947 - 2024) ==
Year	Champion	Location	Notes
1947	Dr. Gustave L. Drexler		
1948	Donald F. Dyal		
1949	Dr. Stephen J. Shaw		
1950	Clarence Kalenian	Orlando	
1951	Major John B. Holt		
1952	Nestor B. Hernandez		
1953	Nestor B. Hernandez (2)		
1954	Nestor B. Hernandez (3)		
1955	August C. Otten	Miami	
1956	Aristides Aguero	Daytona Beach	
1957	Dr. Gustave. L. Drexel (2)	Homestead	
1958	John L. Foster		
1959	Boris Siff		
1960	Robert Ludlow, Carl Dover, Charles Wisch	Miami	Tie
1961	Nick Lanni	Orlando (?)	
1962	Eugene Sidowski	Miami Beach	
1963	Frank B. Rose	Cocoa Beach	
1964	Juan Gonzalez	Miami Beach	
1965	David Brummer, Robert Ludlow (2), Charles Musgrove	St. Petersburg	Tie
1966	Anthony Santasiere	Cocoa Beach	
1967	Dr. Jose A. Fernandez-Leon	Pompano Beach	
1968	Eduardo J. Celorio		
1969	Eduardo J. Celorio (2), Dave Truesdel	Pompano Beach	Tie
1970	John P. Abraham		
1971	Eduardo Celorio (3)	Ft. Lauderdale	
1972	Eduardo Celorio (4)	Miami Beach	
1973	Eduardo Celorio (5)	Ormond Beach	
1974	Luis Buquets	Palm Beach	
1975	Luis Alfonso	Miami	
1976	Arnold Denker	Orlando	
1977	Nick Palevada	Miami	
1978	Arnold Denker (2), Nick Paleveda (2), David Dukes	Orlando	Tie
1979	Arnold Denker (3)	St. Petersburg	
1980	Mike Gatlin	St. Petersburg	
1981	Mike Petersen	Jacksonville	
1982	Gary Sanders	St. Petersburg	
1983	Mike Petersen (2)	Jacksonville	
1984	Eduardo Celorio (6)	Ft. Lauderdale	
1985	Anatoly Dozorets	Winter Park	
1986	Miles Ardaman	St. Petersburg	
1987*	Miles Ardaman (2)	Daytona Beach	
1988	Bill Cornwall	Jacksonville	
1989	Gary Sanders (2), Anatoly Dozorets (2)	Dania	Tie
1990	Gary Sanders (3)	Orlando	
1991	Michail Braude	Plant City	
1992	Larry Kaufman	Pompano Beach	
1993	Nick Paleveda (3)	Jacksonville	
1994	Larry Kaufman (2)	Ft. Lauderdale	
1995	Gabriel Schwartzman	Orlando	
1996	Fabio LaRota	St. Petersburg	
1997*	Rashid Ziatdinov	Orlando	
1998	Eduardo Celorio (7)	Jacksonville	
1999	Franklin Vilaseco	Miami	
2000	Virginijus Grabliauskas	Orlando	
2001	Daniel Fernandez	St. Petersburg	
2002*	Renier Gonzalez	Miami	
2003	Renier Gonzalez (2)	Melbourne	
2004	Renier Gonzalez (3)	Boca Raton	
2005	Wilmer Chavira	Orlando	
2006	Julio Becerra	St. Petersburg	
2007	Julio Becerra (2)	Daytona Beach	
2008	Julio Becerra (3)	St. Petersburg	
2009	Julio Becerra (4)	Miami	
2010	Julio Becerra (5)	Orlando	
2011	Jeff Haskel	Naples	
2012	Lars Bo Hansen	Daytona Beach	
2013	Lars Bo Hansen (2)	Daytona Beach	
2014	Julio Becerra (6)	Palm Beach Gardens	
2015	Julio Becerra (7)	Orlando	
2016	Julio Becerra (8)	Tampa	
2017	Jorge Leon Oquendo	Jacksonsville	
2018	Jorge Leon Oquendo (2)	Jacksonville	
2019	Mykola Bortnyk	Palm Beach Gardens	
2020	None		Cancelled because of COVID-19
2021	Julio Becerra (9)	St. Petersburg	
2022	Bach Ngo	Palm Beach Gardens	
2023	Bach Ngo (2)	Jacksonville	
2024	Bach Ngo (3)	Palm Beach Gardens	
