= Dubai Open Chess Tournament =

Annual chess tournament in Dubai

Dubai Open
Tournament information
- Location: Dubai Chess and Culture Club, Dubai, UAE
- Dates: 27 May–4 June 2025
- Format: 9-round Swiss tournament
- Purse: $39,500

Current champion
- Aleksey Grebnev

The Dubai Open Chess Tournament, also known as the Sheikh Rashid Bin Hamdan Cup, is an annual open chess tournament in Dubai, UAE that is usually held in April. First held in 1999 by the Dubai Chess and Culture Club with the aim of giving exposure to young talent in UAE, the Dubai Open Chess Tournament is today one of the most well-known and strongest open tournaments in the world. The inaugural event in 1999 was won by chess grandmaster Vladimir Akopian.

The 25th edition of the Dubai Open Chess Tournament was held from 27 May - 4 June 2025, at the Dubai Chess and Culture Club. It was won by Aleksey Grebnev.

== History ==
The Dubai Open was first organised in 1999 by the Dubai Chess and Culture Club to allow young players in the UAE to compete against top grandmasters. The tournament consistently attracts dozens of grandmasters, international masters and other titled players and is now considered one of the strongest open tournaments in the world.

=== Winners ===
Year	Champion	Country
2025	Aleksey Grebnev	Russia
2024	Mahammad Muradli	Azerbaijan
2023	Aravindh Chithambaram	India
2022	Aravindh Chithambaram	India
2019	Maxim Matlakov	Russia
2018	Diego Flores	Argentina
2017	Gawain Jones	England
2016	Gawain Jones	England
2015	Dragan Šolak	Turkey
2014	Romain Édouard	France
2013	Aleksandr Rakhmanov	Russia
2012	Ni Hua	China
2011	Abhijeet Gupta	India
2010	Eduardo Iturrizaga	Venezuela
2009	Tigran Kotanjian	Armenia
2008	Wesley So	Philippines
2007	Levan Pantsulaia	Georgia
2006	Sergey Fedorchuk	Ukraine
2005	Wang Hao	China
2004	Shakhriyar Mamedyarov	Azerbaijan
2003	Baadur Jobava	Georgia
2002	Alexander Goloshchapov	Ukraine
2001	Karen Asrian	Armenia
2000	Alexander Nenashev	Uzbekistan
1999	Vladimir Akopian	Armenia

=== 2016 Tournament ===
The 2016 edition of the tournament set a record in participation with 189 players from 37 countries competing in the 9-round Swiss System tournament. The participants included 46 Grandmasters, which was also a new record, eight Woman Grandmasters, 39 International Masters, five Woman International Masters, 22 Fide Masters and two Woman Fide Masters.

== Notable players ==
The tournament is also known to have attracted many young talented players, including world champion Magnus Carlsen, who earned his final GM norm with a round to spare in the 2004, making him the world's youngest GM at the time and the third-youngest GM in history at the age of 13 years, four months and 27 days. Other notable teenagers who have graced the tournament include Azerbaijan's Shakriyar Mamedyarov, who won the tournament in 2004 just two weeks after celebrating his 19th birthday, ahead of 138 players, including 39 grandmasters and 23 international masters. China's Wang Hao celebrated his 16th birthday during the seventh edition of the tournament in 2005 and went on the claim the championship as an untitled player ahead of 53 grandmasters and 30 international masters. Wesley So won his first major international tournament when he topped the Dubai Open in April 2008, just a few months before he turned 15. Wesley So was the youngest grandmaster in the world when he won the event and he is the tournament's youngest champion.

== Incidents ==
The Dubai Open Chess Tournament became known for its aggressive stance against cheating in chess.

In 2008, an untitled Iranian player, M. Sadatnajafi, was caught receiving moves by SMS on his cellphone. Sadatnajafi's games were subsequently annulled and he was disqualified from the tournament.

In 2015, Gaioz Nigalidze from Georgia was expelled from the tournament after tournament officials caught him cheating using a chess app on a smartphone hidden in a toilet cubicle. Nigalidze's opponent, Armenian Grandmaster Tigran Petrosian, complained to the officials about the Georgian's suspicious behaviour and upon inspection Chief Arbiter Mahdi Abdul Rahim found Nigalidze had stored a mobile phone in a cubicle, behind the pan and covered in toilet paper. The device was logged into Nigalidze's social networking account and had one of his games being analysed by a smartphone chess app. Upon confirmation, Yahya Mohammed, the tournament director, passed down the sanction to ban Nigalidze from the tournament.

The case is significant as it resulted to the first judgement on cheating since the Fide's Anti-Cheating Commission was created. Nigalidze, who was the Georgian champion in 2013 and 2014, was banned by Fide for three years from any rated chess competition or any chess activity as an arbiter, organizer or representative of a chess federation, and was also stripped of his Grandmaster title, although his international master (IM) title, obtained in 2009, was left intact.
