= Bengal Chess Association =

- Abbreviation: BCA
- Formation: 2012
- Type: Sports organisation
- Legal status: Association
- Purpose: Chess
- Location: Around West Bengal
- Region served: Entire West Bengal
- Members: Affiliated Districts and Academies/Clubs
- Official language: Bangla
- President: Santanu Lahiri
- Affiliations: All India Chess Federation
- Website: Official Website

The Bengal Chess Association (BCA) is a chess promotion and organising body in West Bengal, India.

== History ==
It was formed on 2012 after the West Bengal Chess Association was dissolved.

The erstwhile West Bengal Ad Hoc Committee, was given an elected form on 3 January 2012, where Sanjoy Sureka was elected president.

The state body, West Bengal Chess Association was dissolved, as it failed to implement the Calcutta High Court's order, given on July 6, 1993 to conduct election within two weeks. Dibyendu Barua, the election officer and the Vice-President of the AICF, held the elections and elected the members of the organisation.

It was affiliated to the All India Chess Federation.

== Affiliates ==
The BCA has a number of affiliated districts bodies, academies and clubs under it.

=== Affiliated Chess Associations ===
Chess associations affiliated with BCA
Alipurduar District Chess Circle
All Hoogly Chess Association
All Howrah Chess Association
All Jalpaiguri Chess Association
All Nadia Chess Association
Birbhum District Chess Association
Bankura District Chess Association
Coochbehar District Chess Association
District Chess Association of North 24 Parganas
District Chess Association of Paschim medinipur
District Chess Association of South 24 Parganas
District Chess Association of Uttar Dinajpur
Gorkha Hill Chess Association
Jhargram District Chess Association
Kalimpong District Chess Association
Kolkata Metropolitan Chess Association
Malda District Chess Association
Murshidabad District Chess Association
Paschim Burdwan District Chess Association
Purba Burdwan District Chess Association
Purulia District Chess Association
South Dinajpur District Chess Association

=== Affiliated Academies and Clubs ===
- Alekhine Chess Club
- Dibyendu Barua Chess Academy
- Bengal Chess Wizard
- Calcutta Chess Academy
- Calcutta Chess Club
- Behala Chess Club
- Lake Town Cultural Organization
- Sealdah Sports & Cultural Organization
- Gariahat Chess Club
- City Chess Forum
- Pioneer chess school

== Events ==
The BCA has been able to organize some notable events in the state.

It organizes the State Selection trials for the National Challengers Chess Tournament every year along with the different age-group tournaments for selecting players for various National Championships.

== See also ==
- All India Chess Federation
