= Chess in Nevada =

Competitive chess in the US state

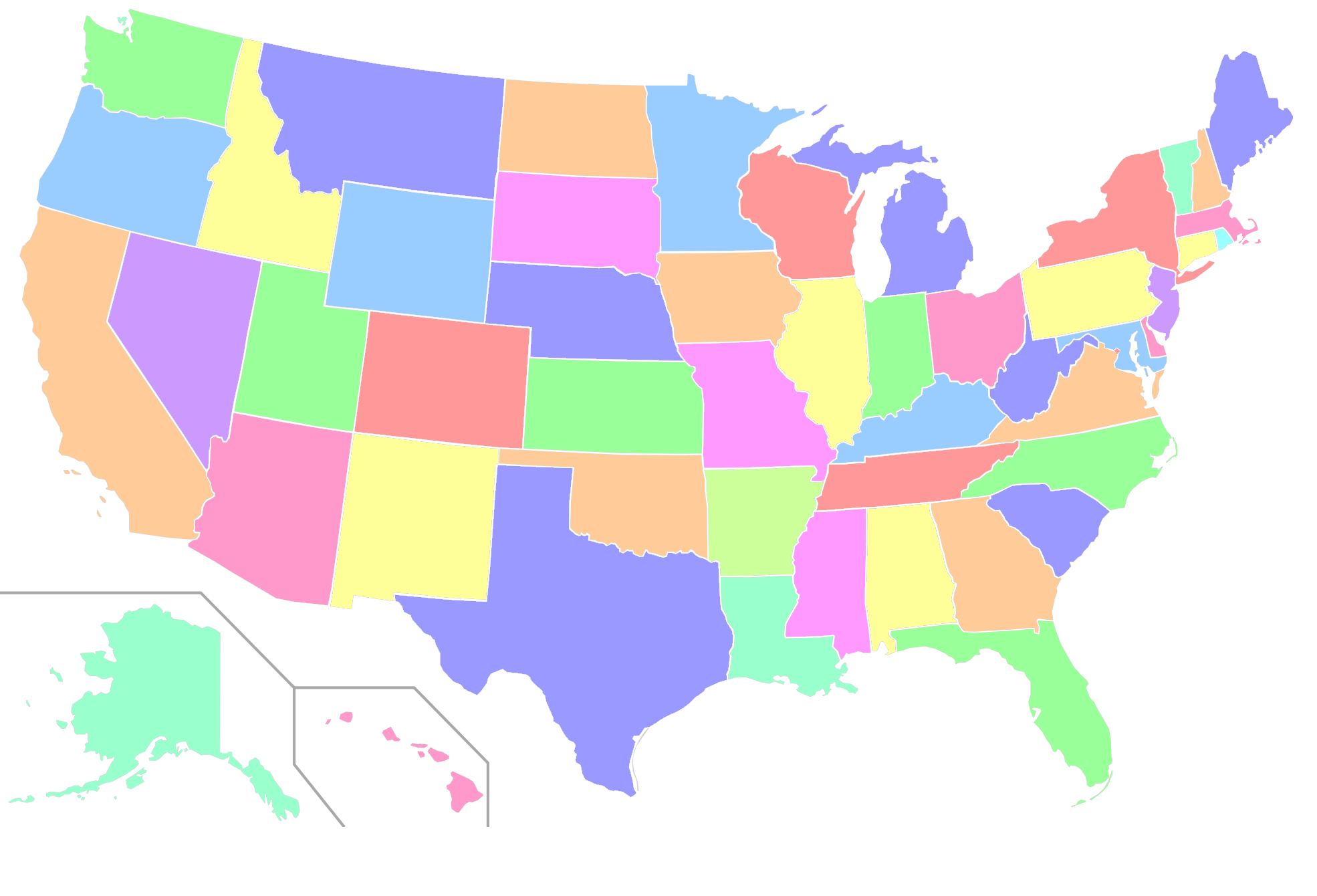
- Top Player: Richard Bitoon (2412 USCF, 2354 FIDE)
- Champion: Leo Creger
- USCF Affiliate: Silver State Chess Association
- Active Players: 560

Chess in Nevada refers to competitive chess played within the state of Nevada. As of August 2025, Nevada has 560 active players registered with the United States Chess Federation. The current USCF Nevada state affiliate is the Silver State Chess Association (formerly Nevada Chess, Inc.).

== History ==
Nevada is often the site of major national and international chess tournaments, going back to the 1960s. Since 1991, the North American Open has been held annually in Las Vegas. In 1999, the 100th annual U.S. Open Chess Championship was held in Reno. From July 31 to August 28, 1999, the FIDE World Chess Championship 1999 took place at Caesars Palace in the Vegas Strip. In July 2025, the 4th leg of the Chess960 Freestyle Chess Grand Slam Tour took place in Vegas.

In February 1996, the USCF Policy Board met to hear a dispute regarding the Nevada state affiliate. The Nevada State Chess Association had an internal dispute where two groups claimed to represent the USCF State Affiliate for Nevada. No other formal record of the proceedings was allowed. The dispute referenced years later by the USCF Executive board when discussing an affiliateship dispute in Alaska.

Late on December 3, 2016, and into the early hours of December 4, GM Timur Gareyev broke the Guinness World Record for most simultaneous blindfolded chess games, playing against 48 opponents. Overall, Gareyev won 35 games, drew 7, and lost 6.

Southern Nevada Chess Club
- Type: Regional Chess Club
- Founded: 2020
- Founder: Marvin Raab
- Location: Las Vegas, Nevada
- Country: United States
- Website: Official Website

In 2020, during the COVID-19 lockdown, Marvin Raab created Bridgeopolis LLC. This club provided online games for the American Contract Bridge League. As pandemic restrictions eased, Bridgeopolis began hosting face-to-face ACBL games. In April 2022, Bridgeopolis hosted the Nevada State Seniors and State Girls tournaments in chess. In June 2022, Bridgeopolis began hosting regular chess tournaments. In April 2024, Bridgeopolis moved to a new location and rebranded as the Southern Nevada Chess Club.

Every Saturday, the Carson City Library Chess Club meets.

In July 2025, the 4th leg of 2025 Freestyle Chess Grand Slam Tour took place in Vegas. Levon Aronian won the grand prize of $200,000. At a side event during the tournament, Magnus Carlsen beat ChatGPT in a game of blind chess.

== Competitors ==
As of August 2025, the following people are the top rated active USCF players from Nevada:

Position	Name	USCF Rating	USCF Titles
1	Richard Bitoon	2412	National Master, Life Master (norms-based)
2	Nazi Paikidze	2388	National Master, Life Master (norms-based)
3	Tom K Brownscombe	2214	Original Life Master, National Master, Candidate Master (norms-based)
4	Peterson Chin Durias	2209	National Master, Candidate Master (norms-based)
5	Edward William Formanek	2200	Original Life Master, National Master, Life Senior Master (norms-based)
6	Nachum Salman	2200	Original Life Master, National Master, Candidate Master (norms-based)
7	Lance Rheiniel Geslani Manalo	2164	1st Category
8	Michael Glick	2159	National Master, Candidate Master (norms-based)
9	Edwin Straver	2137	Candidate Master (norms-based)
10	Michael D Cincotta	2058	

Other top Nevada chess players who aren't currently active USCF members include GM Hovhannes Gabuzyan (2664 Rating), IM Andranik Matikozyan (2429 Rating), and Craig V Chellstorp (2412 Rating).
