= UAE Chess Federation =

Chess federation in the United Arab Emirates

UAE Chess Federation اتحاد الامارات للشطرنج
- Sport: Chess
- Jurisdiction: UAE
- Abbreviation: UAECF
- Founded: 1976
- Affiliation: FIDE; Asian Chess Federation; Arab Chess Federation
- Headquarters: Dubai
- President: Ph. D. Sarhan Hassan Almuaini
- Vice president(s): Abdulaziz Abdulla Khouri
- Secretary: Hussain Khalfan Alshamsi
- (United Arab Emirates)

United Arab Emirates Chess Federation (UAECF) was established in October 1976 to spread and develop the game of chess as a mental and cultural sport across the United Arab Emirates. It organizes national tournaments such as the Emirati Chess Championship.

The UAECF took part in the Against Chess Olympiad held in Libya in 1976. In 1977, it became a member of FIDE. Later on, chess started to spread across all Emirates and chess clubs were set up in Dubai, Sharjah, Abu Dhabi, Ajman, Fujairah and Al-Ain. Chess & Culture Club for Sharjah Women was opened in 1991 and another club for women was affiliated with Dubai Chess and Culture Club in 2000. now there are 16 club officially registered in UAE chess federation. All these clubs play a key role in the discovery and training the young talents, and later on UAECF choose the best players for the national teams, where they come for training under supervision of head coach of UAECF.

== Major achievements ==
Emirati native Saeed Ahmed Saeed won the 1979 Under-14 World Chess Championship held in Mexico and this was the first achievement for UAE in chess at the international level. He repeated the feat in 1981 and was referred to in Arab media as "The Arab computer." Rouda Essa Alserkal recently had the world title as (( world chess championship Under 8 girls, 2017 in Brazil)).

== See also ==
- Arab Chess Federation
