= Alexander Goloshchapov =

Ukrainian chess grandmaster (born 1978)

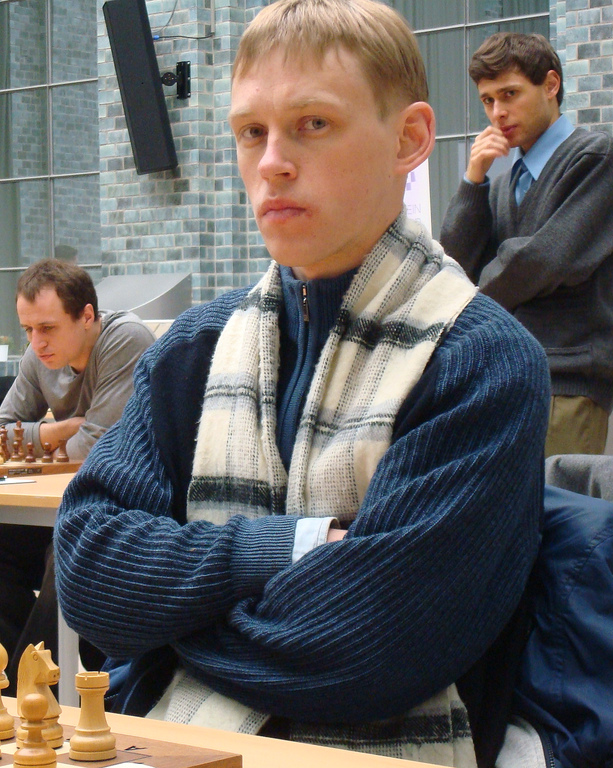
- Goloshchapov in 2008

Personal information
- Born: 25 January 1978 (age 48) Kharkiv, Ukrainian SSR, Soviet Union

Chess career
- Country: Ukraine
- Title: Grandmaster (1999)
- FIDE rating: 2578 (July 2026)
- Peak rating: 2588 (July 2013)

Alexander Anatolyevich Goloshchapov (Ukrainian: Олександр Голощапов; born 25 January 1978) is a Ukrainian chess player and trainer. He was awarded the title Grandmaster by FIDE in 1999.

== Career ==
In 2001 he tied for 1st–3rd with Alexander Riazantsev and Teimour Radjabov in the Alushta Spring tournament. In 2002 Goloshchapov won the Dubai Open. In 2004, came 4th in the 73rd Ukrainian Chess Championship. He tied for 2nd–7th with Friso Nijboer, Eduardas Rozentalis, Michail Brodsky, Erwin L'Ami and Ian Rogers in the Essent Open 2005. In 2006, he tied for 2nd–9th with Vugar Gashimov, Sergei Azarov, Yuri Drozdovskij, Sergey Grigoriants, Krishnan Sasikiran, Vladimir Burmakin and Marcin Szelag in the Cappelle-la-Grande Open tournament.

In 2015 he was awarded the title of FIDE Senior Trainer. Goloshchapov has trained, among others, Parimarjan Negi, S. P. Sethuraman, and Vaibhav Suri.
