= Chess Kids =

Australian chess company

Chess Kids is an Australian company (registered business name Chess World Australia Pty Ltd ) that provides a range of chess-related products and services to schools, individuals and chess clubs. Services include coaching and recreational programs, and vacation-seminars they refer to as "incursions". Their affiliated retailer, Chess World sells chess equipment and accessories to schools.

Chess Kids organises extensive local and regional chess tournaments for students in more than 645 schools across Australia, including the annual National Interschool Chess Championships, with over 9,000 students competing on the regional and national level in 2007.

The company was founded in 1998 by chess enthusiast David Cordover, who was only 20 years old at the time. The start-up funds were provided by the cash prize when Cordover won the Nescafé Big Break Award contest for his business plan vision of bringing chess to every school student in Australia. In an article in Teacher: the National Education Magazine, Cordover described the educational and character-development benefits of chess competition for young children; and wrote that "Research has shown that chess confers many educational benefits, including developing problem-solving ability, abstract analytical skill, spatial ability, memory and concentration."

== Tournaments ==
Chess Kids runs tournaments in Tasmania, Victoria, Western Australia, South Australia and occasionally the Northern Territory. Most of the participants are between 7 and 14 years of age. In the April 2008 issue of Teacher magazine, Chess Kids' founder and chess enthusiast, David Cordover wrote that during the five years since the founding of the tournaments, participation in the tournaments had grown from 821 children the first year to over 9,000 students competing.

The tournaments are set up as regional tournaments, with students from various primary and secondary schools competing on behalf of their schools and organized to that students from the same schools do not compete against each other. Tournaments are run in the Swiss Format with 7 games played by competitors. Each win is worth 1 point, a draw 0.5 points, and a loss 0 points. The events use the free Swiss tournament management software (created by Chess Kids) from www.swisstournament.com. The regional winners compete in the finals at Monash University in December each year.

Chess Kids has presented the National Interschool Chess Championship for five years in conjunction with Monash University, with the most recent event held in December 2015 at the Queens college in Melbourne. The 48-hour tournament hosted 221 student players, from 48 schools. Many schools such as Mount View Primary, Doncaster Gardens Primary and Valkstone Primary have been named 'the best school in Australia'

== Business model ==
Chess Kids offers coaching for individuals, chess clubs and school programs, runs educational holiday programs for children. The cost of the programs are paid on either an hourly or package basis, depending on the type of program and the organization purchasing the package. Chess equipment and supplies sold through their affiliated retail outlet, Chess World, include chess boards and pieces, books, chess clocks, and chess tables.

The company started franchising the concept as a method of expanding to other areas. After reaching 5 franchises in Melbourne and Adelaide the business model changed and all franchises were bought back by the company. Chess Kids New Zealand was started in late 2009 to replicate the business model.

== See also ==
- Chess in Australia
