= Thomas Roussel-Roozmon =

Canadian chess grandmaster (born 1988)

Personal information
- Born: January 8, 1988 (age 38) Laval, Quebec, Canada

Chess career
- Country: Canada
- Title: Grandmaster (2010)
- FIDE rating: 2454 (August 2026)
- Peak rating: 2500 (November 2010)

Thomas Roussel-Roozmon is a Canadian chess grandmaster.

== Chess career ==
Roussel-Roozmon began playing chess at the age of 5. He played for Canada at the 37th, 38th, and 39th Chess Olympiads.

In 2010, Roussel-Roozmon became the fourth Canadian-born player to achieve the Grandmaster title, which he obtained at the 2010 Chess Olympiad held in Khanty-Mansiysk.

== Achievements ==
Roussel-Roozmon has a number of notable chess achievements:

- 2010 Selected Canada's Olympiad National Team
- 2008 Represented Canada at Olympiad
- 2008 1st place, First Saturday Grand Master March, Budapest, Hungary
- 2007 2nd place, Quebec Open Championship
- 2006 Represented Canada at Olympiad
- 2003 Canadian Grade 10 Champion
- 2002 Canadian Grade 9 Champion
- 2000 Represented Canada at World Under-12 Championship (9th place)
- 2000 Canadian Under-12 Champion
- 2000 Canadian Grade 7 Champion

== Personal life ==
Roussel-Roozmon studied philosophy at the Université du Québec à Montréal.
