= Chess in Alaska =

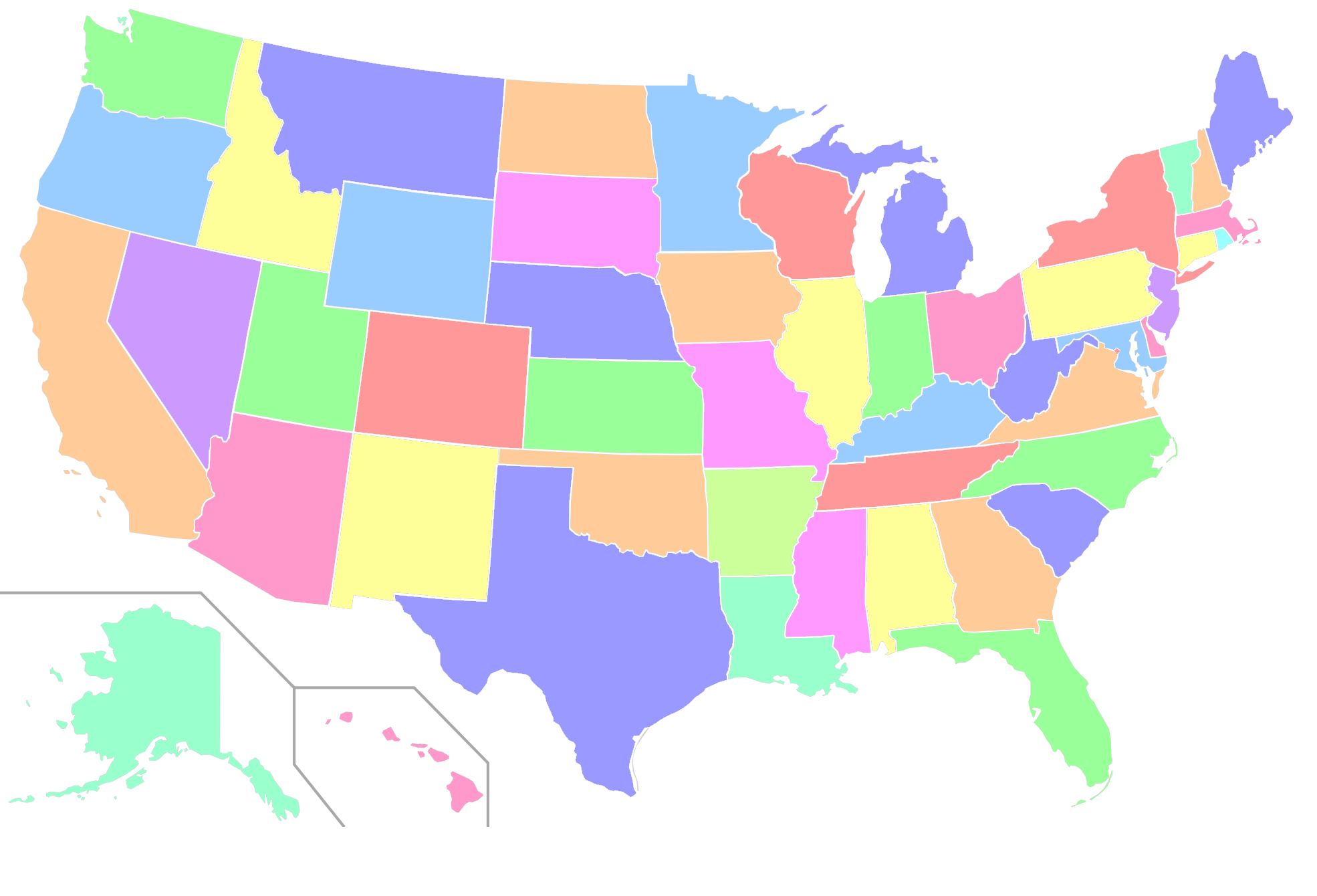
- Top Player: Matthew Parshall (2064 USCF)
- Champion: Mykyta Molla
- USCF Affiliate: Alaska Chess Federation
- Active Players: 166

Chess in Alaska refers to competitive chess played within the state of Alaska. As of March 2026, Alaska only has 166 active players registered with the United States Chess Federation. The current USCF Alaska state affiliate is the Alaska Chess Federation.

== History ==
As a non-contiguous state, Alaska has had limited chess opportunities. The cost of traveling to and from the contiguous states has discouraged chess participation across the state. For example, Alaska was one of three states that did not send a participant to the 2015 Dewain Barber Tournament of K–8 Champions. Alaska has also been the final stop for some “50-state” chess voyagers, including Michael Abron in 2019 and Megan Chen in 2023.

Alaska has had different state chapters throughout its history including Far North Chess, the Alaska Chess League, and the Last Frontier Chess Foundation. The Alaska Chess Federation is the current state chapter, having been founded in 2024.

=== Alaska Chess League Era ===
Alaska Chess League
- Type: Former State Affiliate
- Location: Alaska
- Country: United States
- Website: Archived Website

The Alaska Chess League was the official Alaska USCF state affiliate as far back as at least 1981. The organization was based in Anchorage. The organization's membership dues were $10.

In the March 1981 issue of Chess Life, John McCumiskey was listed as the organization contact and state delegate. Stephen Wayne Gordon was listed as the state's sole alternate voting member. In 1986, the state had no delegates.

In 1996, Far North Chess replaced the Alaska Chess League as the state affiliate.

=== Far North Chess Era ===
Far North Chess
- Type: Former State Affiliate
- Location: Alaska
- Country: United States
- Major events: Alaska State Championship
- Website: USCF Affiliate Page

Since 1996, Far North Chess has been the official Alaska USCF state affiliate. However, Far North Chess has hosted the Alaska state championship as far back as 1991.

In June 2001, the USCF Executive Board met over phone to discuss changing Alaska's state affiliate from Far North Chess to the Alaska Chess League. ACL President Rick Everett, referred to as a "highly regarded master" during the meeting, sent the request. The request had about 20 signatures from the state's most active tournament players. Remembering a previous situation in Nevada, the Executive Board decided to proceed cautiously.

On August 9, 2001, the Executive Board unanimously voted for an election by mail to determine the state affiliate. Any eligible USCF voting member in Alaska would be sent a ballot where they could mark their preference for affiliate leadership. The ballots would be mailed to the USCF office in New Windsor, where the results would be compiled. During the 2002 Delegates Call, the election action was rescinded and Far North Chess remained the official Alaska state affiliate.

In 2012, Grandmaster Bryan Smith recounted his experiences as a child chess player from Anchorage. At age 13, Smith competed in the Alaska junior championship, finishing in third place for his age category. At the 1994 Fur Rendezvous Festival, GM Dmitry Gurevich conducted a simultaneous exhibition that Smith participated in.

In 2014, Far North Chess held its last chess tournament. From 2014 to 2019, no organization that claimed to be the USCF Alaska state affiliate held statewide tournaments. Far North Chess would continue to be recognized as the state affiliate for Alaska, represented as such in the 2015 Chess Yearbook in Chess Life published in April 2016. The following year, however, the Alaska state affiliateship was vacant.

=== Last Frontier Chess Foundation Era ===
Last Frontier Chess Foundation
- Type: Former State Affiliate
- Founded: 2019
- Location: Alaska
- Country: United States
- Major events: Online Alaska State Championship
- Website: Chess.com Page

In January 2019, five individuals formed the Last Frontier Chess Foundation and its executive board: Camilla Malchoff as the president, Blaine Webb as the vice president, Alex Zmijewski as the secretary, Drea Ferrell as the treasurer, and Jonathon Singler as the state delegate. This organization became the official USCF state affiliate.

The Last Frontier Chess Foundation held its first major event Oct. 12, 2019 for National Chess Day 2019. The organization had just been given its state affiliate status at the USCF Delegates meeting in Orlando, Florida. One notable player who played at the event was Mike Abron, who became the first African American to play in a USCF rated tournament in all 50 states.

In November 2019, the Last Frontier Chess Foundation hosted two chess events at Alaska Pacific University: APU November Blitz 2019 and APU 2019 November Quick Open.

Chess saw a surge in popularity during the Coronavirus lockdown. In the midst of the pandemic, the Last Frontier Chess Foundation held two online annual state championship events.

In October 2020, the Last Frontier Chess Foundation won first place for State Percentage Gained in USCF's Membership Appreciation Program. This program recognizes chess organizations that sign up new USCF members.

The 2021 state championship was the organization's last chess event. From 2021 to 2024, no organization that claimed to be the USCF Alaska state affiliate held statewide tournaments. However, regional chess organizations would continue to host events. On National Chess Day 2023, chess players from Illinois competed in a Fairbanks chess tournament. This event was hosted by the Fairbanks Chess Club at the University of Alaska Fairbanks. At the tournament, Megan Chen became the first woman to play a rated tournament in all 50 states.

=== Alaska Chess Federation Era ===
Alaska Chess Federation
- Type: State Affiliate
- Founded: 2024
- Location: Alaska
- Country: United States
- Major events: Alaska State Chess Championship
- Website: Official Website; Instagram

The Alaska Chess Foundation was founded in 2024, which became the USCF Alaska state affiliate. This organization was described by Alaska Public Media as Alaska's "first state chapter in more than half of a decade."

On January 26, 2024, West Homer Elementary School hosted a chess tournament. The event consisted of competitors from Chapman School, Connections, Fireweed Academy, McNeil Canyon Elementary, West Homer Elementary and Homer Middle School. The tournament was orchestrated by a local volunteer.

In 2024, a group of Alaskans established the Alaska Chess Club. The club hosts tournaments at the Mendenhall Valley Public Library conference room in Juneau. A KTOO article documenting the club's seventh tournament was published on December 20, 2024. In the article, tournament organizer Maen Wolf stated that he started the club to expand over-the-board chess opportunities in the area.

The state's largest chess tournament in 2024 was an event in Soldotna hosted by the Arctic Chess Club. The tournament consisted of 33 players.

On May 18, 2025, the Sitka Chess Club hosted its first USCF chess tournament at Harrigan Centennial Hall.

The first state championship since 2013 will take place on October 4, 2025.

== Competitors ==
As of November 2026, the following people are the top rated active USCF players from Alaska:

Position	Name	USCF Rating	USCF Titles
1	Matthew Parshall	2064	1st Category
2	Benjamin Emmanuel Hoback	1829	2nd Category
3	Jim Hanlen	1800	1st Category
4	Mykyta Molla	1777	
5	Brett Michael Zicari	1710	
6	Evaristo Federico Granali Gicain	1707	
7	Aiden Conner Moffat	1676	
8	Jackson Jesalva Badon	1640	
9	David Joel Taylor	1639	3rd Category
10	Joseph William Mudry JR.	1615	

(Bold Indicates Current State Champion)

Other top Alaska chess players who aren't currently active USCF members include NM Rafael Castaneda (2240 Rating), NM Edward G Sawyer (2234 Rating), and NM Artem Edmund Ruppert (2229 Rating).

== State champions ==
Alaska has had numerous state chess champions under its different state affiliates. The known championship records contain gaps.

=== Earliest-known champions ===
These are the earliest-known Alaska chess champions:

No.	Year	Winner(s)
1	1968	Peter S. Cleghorn
2	1969	Peter S. Cleghorn (2)
3	1970	Peter S. Cleghorn (3)
4	1971	Roland Harper
5	1972	Roland Harper (2)
6	1981	Rafael Castaneda
7	1982	Rafael Castaneda (2)
8	1983	Robert Curry
9	1990	Ed Sawyer
10	1992	Mike Berki

=== Far North Chess Era ===
The earliest-known recorded chess tournaments under Far North Chess took place in 1991. The known state champion are as follows:

No.	Year	Winner(s)	Event Name
1	1992	Edward G Sawyer	ALASKA 92' STATE CHAMPIONSHIP
2	1993	William John Donaldson	1993 ALASKA OPEN CHAMP CONS EL
3	1994	Bill H MC Geary	ALASKA STATE CHAMPIONSHIP
4	1995	Unknown	No known tournament held.
5	1996	Unknown	No known tournament held.
6	1997	Unknown	No known tournament held.
7	1998	Unknown	No known tournament held.
8	1999	Unknown	No known tournament held.
9	2000	Artem E Ruppert	ALASKA STATE CHAMPIONSHIP
10	2001	Artem E Ruppert (2)	ALASKA STATE CHAMPIONSHIP
11	2002	Bryan G Smith	ALASKA STATE CHAMPIONSHIP
12	2003	Bryan G Smith (2)	ALASKA STATE CHAMPIONSHIP
13	2004	Artem E Ruppert (3)	2004 ALASKA STATE SCHOLASTIC
14	2005	Scott Mason	2005 AK STATE TOURNAMENT
15	2006	Artem E Ruppert (4)	2006 ALASKA STATE CHAMPIONSHIP
16	2007	Alvar Lluis Alabedra	2007 ALASKA STATE CHAMPIONSHIP
17	2008	Marven Breis	ALASKA STATE CHAMPIONSHIP
18	2009	Jim Hanlen	2009 ALASKA STATE CHAMPIONSHIP
19	2010	Matthew Parshall	ALASKA STATE CHAMPIONSHIP (Open)
20	2011	Jim Hanlen (2)	ALASKA STATE TOURNAMENT 2011
21	2012	Unknown	No known tournament held.
22	2013	David Forthoffer	ALASKA SATE CHAMPIONSHIP

Far North Chess stopped hosting tournaments after 2014, leaving 2013 as its last state championship event. The 2013 Alaska State Championship was the state's last in-person chess championship until 2025.

=== Last Frontier Chess Foundation Era ===
The Last Frontier Chess Foundation held online state championships in 2020 and 2021. Brian Fraiser won the event both times.

No.	Year	Winner(s)	Event Name	Note(s)
1	2020	Brian Fraiser	2020 ONLINE ALASKA STATE CHAMPIONSHIP	Online
2	2021	Brian Fraiser (2)	2021 AK ONL REG CHAMPIONSHIP	Online

Additionally, the Last Frontier Chess Foundation held an online blitz chess state championship in 2021. Benjamin E Hoback won this tournament.

No more statewide chess championships would be held until 2025.

=== Alaska Chess Foundation Era ===
The first Alaska State Championship under the Alaska Chess Federation took place on October 4, 2025, at the Lakefront Anchorage Hotel. FM Arkadii Kliashtornyi won the event.

The second Alaska State Championship under the Alaska Chess Federation took place on October 10-11, 2026, at the Lakefront Anchorage Hotel. Although Kevin Chen won the event, he wasn't a resident, so the title was given to the highest-placing Alaskan resident, Mykyta Molla.

No.	Year	Winner(s)	Champion(s)	Event Name
1	2025	Arkadii Kliashtornyi	Arkadii Kliashtornyi	2025 ALASKA STATE CHESS CHAMPIONSHIP
2	2026	Kevin Chen	Mykyta Molla	2026 ALASKA STATE CHESS CHAMPIONSHIP

== See also ==
- Chess in Utah
- Chess in Nebraska
- Chess in Wyoming
