= Richard Bitoon =

Filipino chess grandmaster (born 1975)

Personal information
- Born: Richard Balansag Bitoon; December 14, 1975 (age 50) Cebu, Philippines

Chess career
- Country: Philippines
- Title: Grandmaster (2011)
- Peak rating: 2515 (November 2011)

Richard Balansag Bitoon (born 14 December 1975, Cebu, Philippines) is a Filipino chess Grandmaster. He obtained the International Master title in 2003. FIDE awarded him the Grandmaster title in 2011.

== Notable tournaments ==
Tournament Name	Year	ELO	Points
ch-PHI 2015(Manila PHI)	2015	2417	7.0
Brunei GM Inv 2012(Bandar Seri Begawan)	2012	2455	5.5
DYTM Nazrin Shah Inv(Kuala Lumpur MAS)	2011	2504	6.5
PHI-ch(Quezon City)	1999	2393	7.0
