= Tamil Nadu State Chess Association =

- Official logo of TNSCA
- Abbreviation: TNSCA
- Formation: 26 April 1947
- Type: Sports organisation
- Legal status: Association
- Purpose: Chess
- Headquarters: 75, J N Street adium, Chennai
- Location: Around Tamil Nadu
- Region served: Entire Tamil Nadu
- Members: Affiliated district associations, academies and special units
- Official language: Tamil
- President: P. R. Venketrama Raja
- Affiliations: All India Chess Federation
- Staff: 18
- Website: Official Website

The Tamil Nadu State Chess Association (TNSCA) is the apex body for the game of chess in Tamil Nadu, India. It was formed on 26 April 1947 with a view to identifying upcoming chess players and mould them into world-class professionals. The association was earlier known as Madras Chess Club. It is affiliated with the All India Chess Federation.

== Affiliates ==
The TNSCA has a number of affiliated district associations, academies and special units under it.

=== District associations ===
- Chennai District Chess Association Refer http://tamilchess.com/distric-associations/
- Life Member District Chess Association
- Chengalpattu District Chess Association
- Coimbatore District Chess Association
- Cuddalore District Chess Association
- Dharmapuri District Chess Association
- Dindigul District Chess Association
- Erode District - Ad Hoc Committee
- Kanchipuram District Chess Association
- Kanyakumari District Chess Association
- Karur District Chess Association
- Krishnagiri District Chess Association
- Madurai District Chess Association
- Namakkal District Chess Foundation
- Nilgiris District Chess Association
- Pudukkottai District Chess Association
- Salem District Chess Association
- Sivagangai District Chess Association
- Thanjavur District Chess Association
- Thoothukudi District Chess Association
- Trichy District Chess Association
- Tirunelveli District Chess Association
- Tirupur District Chess Association
- Thiruvallur District Chess Association
- Tiruvannamalai District Chess Association
- Tiruvarur District Chess Association

CHennai

- Vellore District Chess Association Ad Hoc Committee
- Villupuram District Chess Association
- Virudhunagar District Chess Association

=== Academies ===
- Cape Chess Academy Nagercoil
- Aaron Chess Academy
- champion Chess Academy Tiruvannamalai
- Anna Nagar Chess Academy
- Chess Gurukul
- Chromepet Chess Institute
- King Chess Foundation
- Purasai Chess Academy
- Shakthi Chess Academy
- Solar Chess Club
- Stars Chess Academy Nagercoil
- T. Nagar Chess Academy
- Taanyakhavya School of Sports
- Vaishnavi Friends Club
- Mount Chess Academy
- Universal Sports Academy
- Meenakshi Chess Centre
- Nova Chess Academy
- The Elite Club of Chess
- Utilityforum of Chess
- Castle Chess Academy
- Chola Chess Academy
- Bloom Chess Academy
- Vishy Anand Chess Academy
- Thiruthuraipoondi Chess Club
- Vaelai Chess Academy
- Thirumangalam Kidscare Chess Academy
- sai chess academy, erode
- Villupuram Chess Academy, Villupuram

=== Special units ===
- ESI Corporation Regional Office (TN)
- ICF Sports Association
- Indian Bank Sports Central Sports Committee
- Nanjil Chess Club
- Southern Railway Sports Association
- Sports Promotion Foundation
- St. Johns International Residential School
- T.N.E.B. Sports Control Board
- SRM University
- St Joseph's College Of Engineering

== Events ==
1. The association has been organizing a number of chess events.
2. Chess tournament details can also be found in easypaychess.
2. Chess tournament details can also be found in https://www.chessfee.com/.
