= Mind Champions Academy =

The MindChampions Academy, a not-for-profit initiative, was set up as a joint initiative with the Grandmaster Viswanathan Anand and NIIT Ltd, with the objective of promoting chess in schools to enable development of young minds. Currently, over a million students in more than 5000 schools across India are benefiting from this initiative.

Since 2003, the academy has fostered nearly 5280 schools with over 100,000 students as its members, in schools across the country. GM Viswanathan Anand has personally traveled to Agartala, Guwahati, Hyderabad, Mumbai, New Delhi, Chennai and other cities across India, to encourage school students to start playing. The MindChampions Academy conducts an Annual Chess Tournament, known as ChessMaster for these school children across 16 states in the NIIT network.

As part of the academy, NIIT provides every school an MCA kit. The MCA kit consists of a diary, Computer Based Tutorials (CBT) enabling the students to learn the game on a self paced mode, chess software to play with the computer, validated web links on Chess, details about the most famous Chess players, explanation of some of the most useful tactics to win a match, software that enables kid to play more matches over the internet, a chess board and coins and also a process manual on how to form the club and the club functionalities and responsibilities.
