= West Bengal Chess Association =

Chess organization in India

- Official logo of WBCA
- Abbreviation: WBCA
- Formation: 1959
- Dissolved: 2012
- Type: Sports organisation
- Legal status: Association
- Headquarters: Room No. 28; Netaji Indoor Stadium; Eden Gardens; Calcutta - 700 021
- Location: Around West Bengal
- Region served: Entire West Bengal
- Members: Affiliated Districts and Academies/Clubs
- Official language: Bangla
- President: Ramola Chakraborty
- Affiliations: All India Chess Federation
- Staff: 12
- Website: Official Website

The West Bengal Chess Association (WBCA) the apex body for the game of chess in West Bengal, India, was dissolved in 2012 after the formation of the Bengal Chess Association. It was formed in the late 1959s and was affiliated with the All India Chess Federation.

== Affiliates ==
The WBCA used to have a number of affiliated districts bodies, academies and clubs under it.

=== Affiliated District Associations ===
- North 24 Parganas District Chess Association
- South 24 Parganas District Chess Association
- Howrah District Chess Association
- Hooghly District Chess Association
- Burdwan District Chess Association
- Purba Midnapur District Chess Association
- Jalpaiguri District Chess Association
- Darjeeling District Chess Association
- Murshidabad District Chess Association
- Coochbihar District Chess Association
- Uttar Dinajpur District Chess Association
- Nadia District Chess Association

=== Affiliated Academies and Clubs ===
- Alekhine Chess Club
- Dibyendu Barua Chess Academy
- Calcutta Chess Academy
- Calcutta Chess Club
- Behala Chess Club
- Lake Town Cultural Organization
- Sealdah Sports & Cultural Organization
- Gariahat Chess Club
- City Chess Forum
- Pulse Chess Academy

== Events ==
The WBCA had organised some notable events in the state.

- On December 4 to 14, 1996, the WBCA organized for the first time in India the Commonwealth Open Chess Championship at Kolkata.
- In 1999, the WBCA organised the National Age Group Chess Championship at Howrah.
- In 2000, WBCA held All India Fide Rated Chess Tournament at Kolkata.

== See also ==
- Gariahat Chess Club
