= Chess in Colorado =

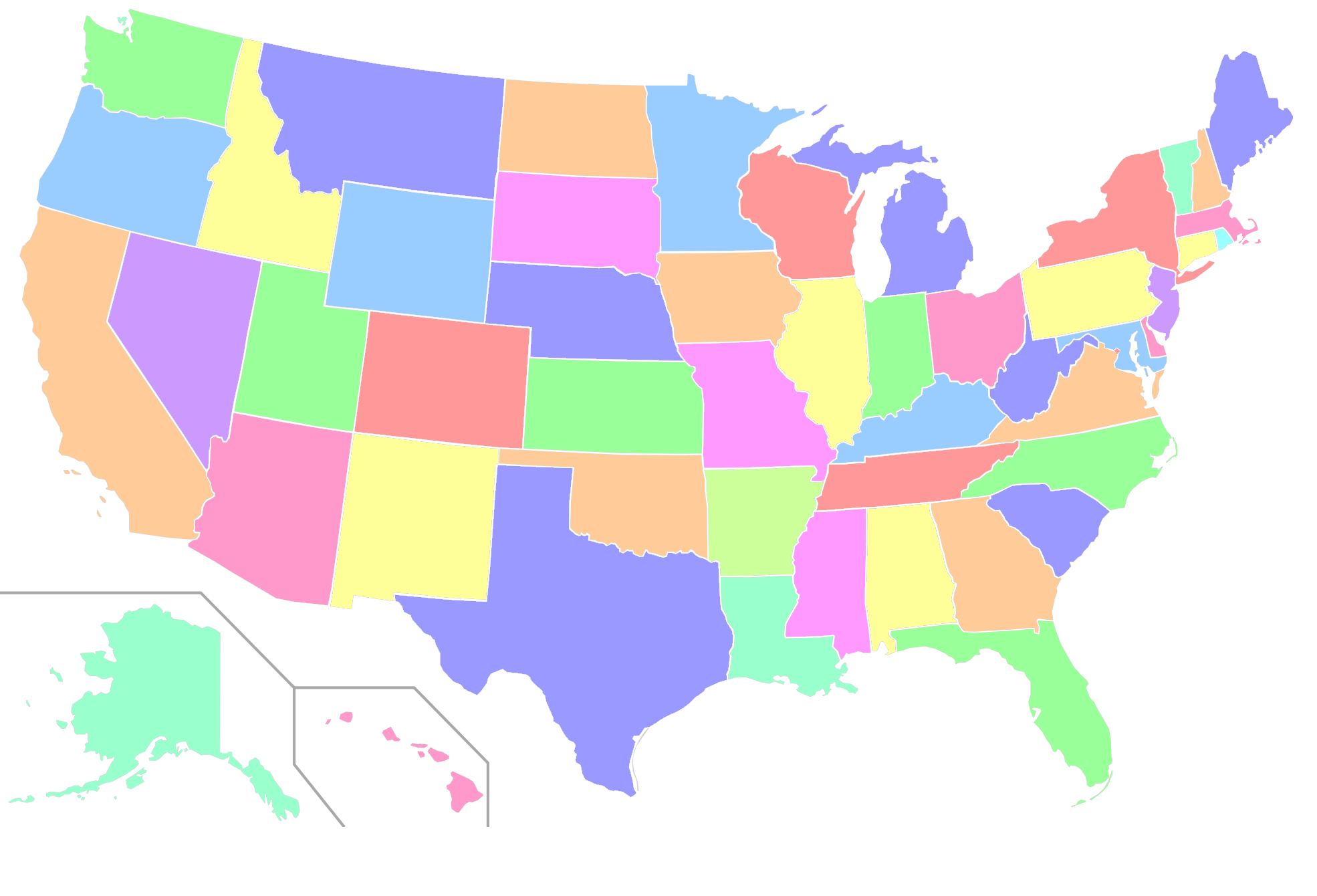
- Top Player: Michael Mulyar (2464 USCF)
- Champion: Griffin Thomas McConnell
- USCF Affiliate: Colorado State Chess Association
- Active Players: 868

Chess in Colorado refers to competitive chess played within the state of Colorado. As of August 2025, Colorado has 868 active players registered with the United States Chess Federation. The current USCF Colorado state affiliate is the Colorado State Chess Association.

== History ==
In 1968, the 69th annual U.S. Open Chess Championship was held in Aspen.

At the 1995 Colorado Open, David Lucky and Todd Bardwick played the longest continuous chess game between masters in U.S. history. In total, the game lasted for 12 hours with 143 moves.

In 2023, Kevin McConnell and his family took over PALs Chess Academy, one of Colorado’s largest chess enrichment programs. To encourage greater chess participation among girls, PALs hosted the Rocky Mountain All-Girls Chess Camp in July 2025. Helping teach the camp were WFM Mairebis Castillo and WGM Sabina Foisor.

On October 8, 2024, Garry Kasparov spoke at the University of Colorado Boulder. The event took place inside of the Macky Auditorium.

The coronavirus lockdowns led to increased interest to chess across the state, especially among youth. An October 2023 article in The Gazette noted strong turnout at a tournament that took place at St. Gabriel the Archangel Catholic Church in Colorado Springs.

The Peterson Space Force Base in Colorado Springs hosts free chess tournaments for participants of all ages at its library.

== Competitors ==
As of August 2025, the following people are the top rated active USCF players from Colorado:

Position	Name	USCF Rating	USCF Titles
1	Michael A Mulyar	2464	Original Life Master, National Master, Life Senior Master (norms-based)
2	Isaak Parpiev	2439	National Master
3	Gunnar Andersen	2381	Original Life Master, National Master, Life Master (norms-based)
4	Sullivan Mac McConnell	2355	Original Life Master, National Master, Life Master (norms-based)
5	Philipp Ponomarev	2328	National Master, Life Master (norms-based)
6	Paul Richter	2324	National Master, Life Master (norms-based)
7	Noel Hernandez Marques	2268	
8	Jesse Cohen	2228	National Master, Candidate Master (norms-based)
9	Richard Shtivelband	2218	Original Life Master, National Master, Life Master (norms-based),
10	Brian D Wall	2200	Original Life Master, National Master, Life Master (norms-based)

Other top Colorado chess players who aren't currently active USCF members include IM Steven M Odendahl (2507 Rating), GM Dashzegve Sharavdorj (2502 Rating), and Alexei Novikov (2459 Rating).

== State championship ==
The 2025 state champion is Griffin Thomas McConnell. In 2024, the state champion was Eamon Curchin Montgomery.
