= Dominica Chess Federation =

- Abbreviation: DCF
- Formation: December 28, 2021
- Headquarters: Roseau, Dominica
- President: Ian Dorival
- Vice President: Nigel Francis
- Technical Director: Larry Thomas
- Parent organization: FIDE
- Website: http://www.dominicachessfederation.org/

The Dominica Chess Federation (DCF) is the governing organization of chess in Dominica. It is a non-profit organization and a member of International Chess Federation. The DCF was founded in 2021 to grow and support chess on the island.

== Activities ==
The Dominica National Chess Tournament is run by the DCF and has been held Annually since 2022. The federation also hosts other tournament, and oversees the national Chess in Schools program.

== See also ==
- International Chess Federation
- Dominica Olympic Committee
