= Chess in Idaho =

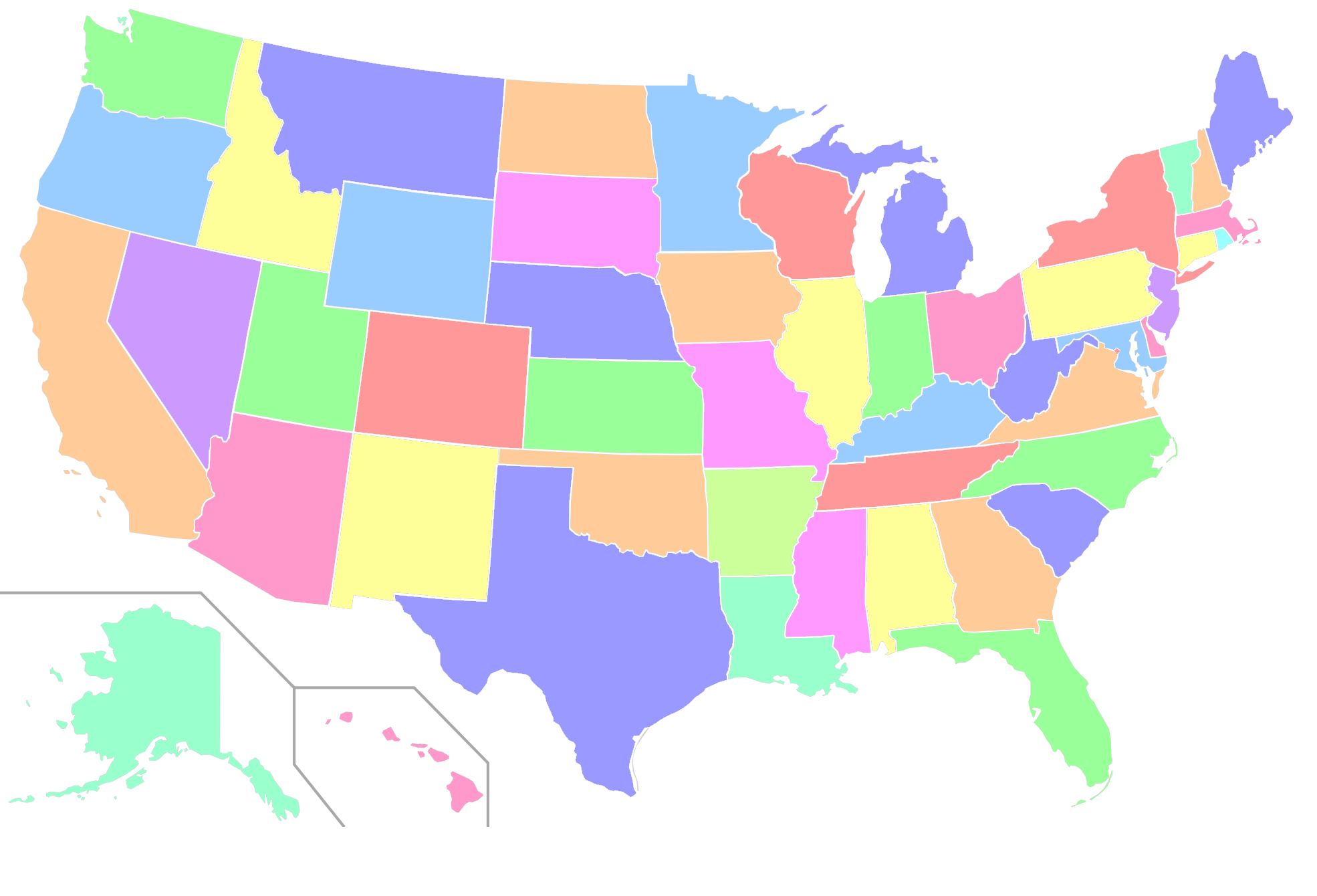
- Top Player: Christofer Peterson (2243 USCF)
- Champion: James Wei, Josh Price, & Cody Gorman
- USCF Affiliate: Idaho Chess Association
- Active Players: 258

Chess in Idaho refers to competitive chess played within the state of Idaho. As of August 2025, Idaho has 258 active players registered with the United States Chess Federation. The current USCF Idaho state affiliate is the Idaho Chess Association.

== History ==
In 2009, at age 10, Luke Vellotti from Boise became the highest-rated chess player in Idaho. By 2013, Vellotti became the top-ranked chess player under 15 in the United States. He began attending the University of California, Los Angeles at age 14.

Around 2016, a teenage Nathan Barry designed a logo for the Idaho Chess Association.

In May 2017, grandmaster Timur Gareyev travelled around Idaho to promote chess education. The trip was sponsored by the Blaine County School District (BCSD) Chess Club. GM Timur began the trip by playing blindfold chess with 18 players at Memorial Park in Boise. The next day, GM Timur travelled to Silver Creek High School, where he participated in a Socratic discussion and attended a chess lesson taught in sign language. One week prior to his trip, he trained the BSCD Chess Club Middle School chess team at that year's Supernationals in Knoxville, TN.

Throughout 2021, David Rush sought to break a world record every week. Rush ultimately broke 43 records, two being "Fastest time to arrange a chess set" and "Fastest time to arrange a chess set (team of two)".

In May 2025, 13-year-old Griffin Baldwin from Eagle captured local attention when he defeated local news anchor Scott McLinden in a friendly match before heading off to the Chess SuperNationals in Orlando, Florida.

== Competitions ==
The Idaho Chess Association invites top players from the state's scholastic chess championship to the Idaho Tournament of Champions and to major national competitions.

== Competitors ==
As of August 2025, the following people are the top rated active USCF players from Idaho:

Position	Name	USCF Rating	USCF Titles
1	Christofer Peterson	2243	National Master, Candidate Master (norms-based)
2	Jeff S Gamble	2140	National Master, 3rd Category
3	James Wei	2120	1st Category
4	Josh Price	2035	1st Category
5	Larry R Parsons	2000	National Master, 1st Category
6	Michael Edward Cambareri	1968	1st Category
7	Caleb Kircher	1966	1st Category
8	Linus Quinn Wannamaker	1956	2nd Category
9	Zygmond Mayer	1920	1st Category
10	Finn Belew	1892	1st Category

Other top Idaho chess players who aren't currently active USCF members include Singer Coats (2401 Rating), FM James J Maki (2323 Rating), and NM Michael D Gold (2310 Rating).

== List of state champions ==
№	Year	Winner(s)	Notes
1	1947	Charles H. Stewart	
2	1948	Mel Schubert	
3	1949	Charles H. Stewart (2)	
4	1950	LaVerl Kimpton	
5	1951	LaVerl Kimpton (2) & Glen Buckendorf	Tie
6	1952	LaVerl Kimpton (3)	
7	1953	LaVerl Kimpton (4)	
8	1954	Glen Buckendorf (2)	
9	1955	Dick Vandenburg	
10	1956	Glen Buckendorf (3)	
11	1957	Glen Buckendorf (4)	
12	1958	Dick Vandenburg (2)	
13	1959	Glen Buckendorf (5)	
14	1960	Glen Buckendorf (6)	
15	1961	George Krauss Jr.	
16	1962	George Krauss Jr. (2)	
17	1963	Dick Vandenburg (3)	
18	1964	Dick Vandenburg (4)	
19	1965	Dick Vandenburg (5)	
20	1966	Bert Germalm	
21	1967	Glen Buckendorf (7)	
22	1968	Glen Buckendorf (8)	
23	1969	Wolfgang Freese	
24	1970	Rex Wilcox	
25	1971	David Reynods	
26	1972	Glen Buckendorf (9)	
27	1973	Harold Moye	
28	1974	Kenneth Sanderson	
29	1975	Gregory T. Perryman	
30	1976	William Whitacre	
31	1977	Dick Vandenburg (6) & Larry R. Parsons	Tie
32	1978	William Whitacre (2)	
33	1979	Larry R. Parsons (2)	
34	1980	Richard Burchett	
35	1981	Yge Visser & Richard Burchett (2)	Tie
36	1982	Paul Johnson & Larry R. Parsons (3)	Tie
37	1983	Larry R. Parsons (4)	
38	1984	Larry R. Parsons (5)	
39	1985	Paul Johnson (2)	
40	1986	Leslie R. Colin	
41	1987	Larry R. Parsons (6)	
42	1988	Stewart Q. Sutton & Steven Allie	Tie
43	1989	Larry R. Parsons (7)	
44	1990	Joseph Kennedy	
45	1991	Joseph Kennedy (2)	
46	1992	Joseph Kennedy (3)	
47	1993	Michael A. Henderson	
48	1994	Larry R. Parsons (8) & Daniel D. Drumm	Tie
49	1995	John B. Carr & Jim A. McClure	Tie
50	1996	Larry R. Parsons (9)	
51	1997	Leroy Hill & Larry R. Parsons (10) & Stewart Q. Sutton (2)	Tie
52	1998	Larry R. Parsons (11)	
53	1999	Larry R. Parsons (12)	
54	2000	Larry R. Parsons (13)	
55	2001	Larry R. Parsons (14) & Stewart Q. Sutton (3) & Glen Buckendorf (10)	Tie
56	2002	Michael D. Gold & Larry R. Parsons (15)	Tie
57	2003	Michael D. Gold (2)	
58	2004	Stewart Q. Sutton (4) & Dylan T. Smith & David J. Eacker	Tie
59	2005	Karl T. Disher	
60	2006	Garrett Reynolds & Daniel A. Taylor	Tie
61	2007	Hans M. Morrow	
62	2008	Doitchin Krastev *	
63	2009	Garrett Reynolds (2)	
64	2010	Phil Weyland & Larry R. Parsons (16) & Doitchin Krastev (2) *	Tie
65	2011	Caleb P. Abernathy	
66	2012	Larry R. Parsons (17) & Blake Furlow	Tie
67	2013	Larry R. Parsons (18)	
68	2014	Caleb Paul Kircher	
69	2015	David Lucky	
70	2016	David Lucky (2)	
71	2017	David Lucky (3)	
72	2018	Alex Machin	
73	2019	Jacob Nathan & Kevin Xu	Tie
74	2020	Jacob Nathan (2)	
75	2021	Larry R. Parsons (19)	
76	2022	Kaustubh Kodihalli	
77	2023	James Wei, Kaustubh Kodihalli (2), & Josh Price	Tie
78	2024	James Wei (2)	
79	2025	James Wei (3), Josh Price (2), Cody Gorman	Tie
