= Maharashtra Chess Association =

- Official logo of MCA
- Abbreviation: MCA
- Formation: 1963
- Type: Sports organisation
- Legal status: Association
- Purpose: Chess
- Headquarters: Vastupuja Apartment; 39, Trisharan Nagar; Khamla, Nagpur-440025; Maharashtra, India
- Location: Around Maharashtra
- Region served: Entire Maharashtra
- Members: Affiliated districts
- Official language: Marathi
- President: Adv. Kashinath G. Navandar
- Affiliations: All India Chess Federation
- Staff: 14
- Website: [ Official Website]

The Maharashtra Chess Association (MCA) is the apex body for the game of chess in Maharashtra, India. It was formed in 1963 and is affiliated with the All India Chess Federation.

== History ==
The first chess association in Maharashtra is South Maharashtra Chess Club which was formed in 1921. In 1930 the Sangali Chess Society was established. Again in 1941, Nutan Buddhibal Mandal was formed in Sangali, which is still in existence. Later in 1955 the Southern Maratha Country Chess Association was formed. Looking at the growth of the game in Bombay Province, the first Chess body, Known as Bombay Chess Association was established in 1944. Then in 1950, All India Chess Federation was started in Bombay. In 1963, the Bombay Chess Association and Southern Maratha Country Chess Association were merged and the unified state Association came to be known as Maharashtra Chess Association.

== Affiliates ==
All the districts in Maharashtra are affiliated to the Maharashtra Chess Association.
