= Chess Federation of Canada =

Chess governing body in Canada

- Fédération canadienne des échecs
- Abbreviation: CFC (English); FCE (French)
- Formation: 1872
- Headquarters: Burlington, Ontario
- Region served: Canada
- Members: ▲5,848 (2026)
- President: Vlad Drkulec
- Vice President: Olga Mushtaler
- Executive Director: Robert Gillanders
- Affiliations: FIDE, Confederation of Chess for America
- Website: www.chess.ca/en/
- Formerly called: Canadian Chess Association (1872–1932)

The Chess Federation of Canada (CFC; Canadian French: Fédération canadienne des échecs, FCE) is Canada's national chess organization. The Canadian Chess Association, founded in 1872, was replaced in 1932 by the Canadian Chess Federation (CCF), which for the first time included representation from all major cities in Canada. In 1945, the name was changed to avoid confusion with the Co-operative Commonwealth Federation. The CFC organizes tournaments and publishes national ratings. The highest rated player in Canada by peak rating is GM Shawn Rodrigue-Lemieux of Quebec.

== Activities ==
From 1974 to 2008 the CFC published a bi-monthly magazine called Chess Canada. Its former titles were En Passant and CFC Bulletin. The magazine reported on the latest important tournaments in Canada, especially those with Grandmaster-strength players, including many game scores. The magazine also printed the top ratings of several age groups and top overall in Canada. Chess Canada also posted notices of upcoming tournaments across Canada. It has since been replaced with an online magazine, which contains many of the same functions. The editor is John Upper.

The CFC organizes the Canadian Open every July. The first Canadian Open was held in Montreal in 1956 and saw the participation of Bobby Fischer. In recent years, the tournament has increased in prestige, becoming a part of the ACP Tour in 2007. Previous editions attracted Boris Spassky, Paul Keres, Bent Larsen, Ljubomir Ljubojević, Alexei Shirov, Vasily Ivanchuk and Nigel Short. The Canadian Youth Chess Championships are usually held just prior to the Canadian Open at the same location.

The CFC organizes a national championship every one or two years. As Canada is a FIDE Zone, many players earn their International Master or FIDE Master title in the Canadian Chess Championship. In addition, the CFC runs the Canadian Women's and Canadian Junior Championship. It also sends men's and women's teams to Chess Olympiads held every other year.

== Ratings system ==
The CFC uses the Elo rating system. CFC ratings for a player tend to be around fifty points higher than United States Chess Federation ratings and ninety points higher than FIDE ratings.

== CFC titles ==
The CFC awards National Master titles to players who perform at a high level. They are awarded to players with a published, non-provisional CFC rating of 2200, and (at any point) three "norms", which are performances of 2300, comprising at least five games each. The other option is getting a non-provisional CFC rating of 2300 at any point.

== Current champions ==
- Canadian Open Champion: Nikolay Noritsyn
- Canadian Champion: Nikolay Noritsyn
- Women's Champion: Li Yunshan
- Junior Champion: Johnathan Han
- Youth Champion U18: Tymur Keleberda

== See also ==
- Chess in Canada
- Canadian chess periodicals
- Manitoba Chess Association
