= Saeed Ahmed Saeed =

Emirati chess player (born 1968)

Personal information
- Born: 24 November 1968 (age 57)

Chess career
- Country: United Arab Emirates
- Title: International Master (1982)
- FIDE rating: 2435 (July 2026)
- Peak rating: 2435 (January 1986)

Saeed Ahmed Saeed (Arabic: سعيد أحمد سعيد; born 24 November 1968) is an Emirati chess International Master.

== Chess career ==
Saeed Ahmed Saeed won the 1981 Under-14 World Chess Championship held in Xalapa.

In 1985 in Taxco he participated in the World Chess Championship Interzonal Tournament where he ranked in 15th place.

Saeed Ahmed Saeed played for the United Arab Emirates in the Chess Olympiads:

- In 1980, at second board in the 24th Chess Olympiad in La Valletta (+7, =4, -3),
- In 1984, at first board in the 26th Chess Olympiad in Thessaloniki (+7, =4, -3).

Saeed Ahmed Saeed played for the United Arab Emirates in the Men's Asian Team Chess Championships:

- In 1979, at second board in the 3rd Asian Team Chess Championship in Singapore (+6, =0, -2).

Saeed Ahmed Saeed was awarded the Chess International Master (IM) title. He is member of Dubai Chess and Culture Club.
