= The Lakefront Anchorage Hotel =

Hotel in Anchorage, Alaska, United States

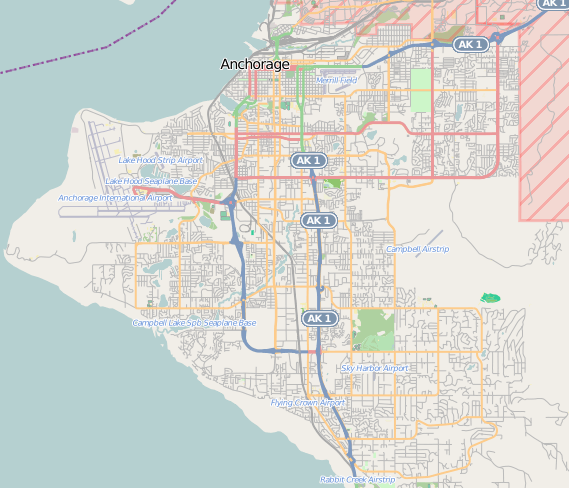
- Location within Anchorage The Lakefront Anchorage Hotel (Alaska)

General information
- Location: 4800 Spenard Road, Anchorage, AK
- Coordinates: 61°10′40″N 149°56′32″W

The Lakefront Anchorage Hotel, formerly known as The Millennium Alaska Hotel, is the only lakeside hotel in Anchorage situated on the shores of scenic Lake Hood, one mile from Anchorage International Airport and four miles from downtown Anchorage. The Lakefront Anchorage Hotel is operated as part of the Millennium & Copthorne Hotels chain. It has 248 guest rooms, laundry services, multiple meeting and events facilities, exercise room, and 2 restaurants known as "The Flying Machine", which serves breakfast all year, and dinner in the summer, and the "Fancy Moose Lounge" which serves lunch and dinner all year long. During the summer months they open up the deck area for guest to sit and dine, all while watching the float planes fly by.

It opened in 1986 as the Clarion, then 1992 Regal Alaska Hotel, then in 2001 The Millennium Alaska Hotel, and when the hotel remodeled in 2015 it became the now, Lakefront Anchorage Hotel.

Since it opened it has been the operational headquarters of the Iditarod Trail Sled Dog Race.

== History ==
Joe Spenard found the future site of this hotel by a moose trail, now Spenard RD, in 1922. This heavily forested area was considered a remote settlement and, after Spenard Resort was built, was an excuse for the citizens of Anchorage to “Get Out Of Town". Spenard Resort was a clapboard building with a veranda. Tourists were invited to swim in the lake, relax on the veranda and picnic on the grounds.

In 1938 the property was rebuilt and became the Idle Hour Country Club, a supper club with a sunken dance floor and a glass wall view to the lake. This club was the social hub of for several years, hosting many major functions. Oddly enough, considering that the then-named Town of Spenard was second is size to Anchorage on the State map, getting out to the Country Club was almost as difficult for guests as it was for our lost settler. The trail was still unpaved and riddled with Alaskan-sized, and often life-threatening potholes. Occasionally “someone might throw some gravel in the worst of them,” says a long-time resident of the area.

The building was destroyed by fire in 1952, and again in 1956. After this, owner after owner went bankrupt trying to re-establish the former glory of the Idle Hour, until 1970 when Terry Miller opened the Fancy Moose Inn. The Fancy Moose, named after Terry's wife, Fancy, was a supper club and a motel with 20 unites. The “Moose” part of the name came from the unusually large moose rack, shot with a bow and arrow by Terry himself, which hung in the original Fancy Moose. Today the moose rack can be seen in our lobby above the stone fireplace, too large to fit into the Fancy Moose Lounge.

In 1972, The Fancy Moose, having been remodeled into two separate rooms, because the Fancy Moose Supper Club in the front section, and “unofficially,” “The Rock in the Rear” in the back. Trouble with the local liquor licensing board followed this unauthorized use of the liquor license. Difficulties piled up, and by the 1975 the Fancy Moose liquor license was declared dead by reason of “non-renewal". Beginning in 1978, the Fancy Moose became the Flying Machine and the Flying Machine Mexican Restaurant. While the Flying Machine was successful for several years, the Mexican Restaurant was an instant failure and was succeeded by such establishments as the Red Baron, the Co-Pilot Club, the Oar House, and finally the Fly-By-Night Club.

In 1985, the Fly-By-Night Club moved up the road and the old building was torn down to make way for the Clarion Anchorage Hotel. The hotel opened on June 1, 1986. In 1992, the hotel's name was changed to the Regal Alaskan Hotel, which it remained until 2001.

In reference to former owners of the site, the hotel named their restaurant the Flying Machine and the lounge-café the Fancy Moose lounge. The Flying Machine Restaurant, Fancy Moose Lounge, and the hotel lobby all contain historic photos of the aviation pioneers and personalities that created the character of the "Last Frontier."

On October 4, 2025, the hotel hosted the 2025 Alaska State Championship in chess. This was Alaska's first chess state championship since 2013. FM Arkadii Kliashtornyi won the tournament.

== See also ==
- Chess in Alaska
