= Dubai Chess and Culture Club =

- نادي دبي للشطرنج والثقافة
- Formation: May 16, 1981
- Headquarters: Dubai, UAE
- Location: Al Mamzar
- Honorary President: Sheikh Hamdan Bin Rashid Al Maktoum, Deputy Ruler of Dubai and Minister of Finance and Industry of the UAE
- Chairman: Ebrahim Al Bannai
- General Manager: Mohamed Husseiny
- Parent organization: Dubai Sports Council
- Affiliations: FIDE and UAE Chess Federation
- Website: http://www.dubaichess.ae

Dubai Chess and Culture Club was established in 1979 as a part of the UAE Chess Federation, the governing body of chess in the UAE, and was officially recognized as an independent entity on May 16, 1981. The club's headquarters was acclaimed as the most modern and biggest dedicated chess club in the world when it was inaugurated on May 2, 1999. The building is designed in the shape of a rook, a piece in the game of chess. Some of the most notable members of the club include Saeed Ahmed Saeed, the UAE's first world champion in chess and first international master, and Taleb Moussa, the UAE's first chess grandmaster.

Sheikh Hamdan Bin Rashid Al Maktoum, Deputy Ruler of Dubai and Minister of Finance, is the honorary president of the Club. Sheikh Hamdan has played a major role in supporting the chess movement in the region.

== History ==
Dubai Chess and Culture Club was established in 1981. The club's headquarters was originally located in Burj Nahar in Deira District before it was moved permanently to its current location in Al Mamzar, Dubai. The club's current headquarters was built on May 2, 1999 and was widely acknowledged as the most modern and biggest dedicated chess club in the world when it was completed. The club played a major role in organizing the 27th World Chess Olympiad, which was hosted by the UAE Chess Federation from November 14 to December 2 at the Dubai World Trade Centre with 108 teams from 107 countries taking part, the first time participation in the Olympiad reached over a hundred. Some players who attended the event described it the best organized Olympiad. The club has hosted other international events such as the 2014 World Rapid and Blitz Championships, which was attended by nearly all the top players in the world, including then-World Champion Magnus Carlsen, FIDE Dubai Rapid Grand Prix in 2002, Asian Cities Championships, Arab Chess Championships and the annual Dubai Open Chess Tournament.

== Facilities ==
The Dubai Chess and Culture Club building located in Al Mamzar was regarded as the most modern and biggest chess club in the world when it was completed on May 2, 1999. The club is noted for having its own dedicated facilities that allows it to host chess and non-chess activities.

- His Highness Sheikh Seed Bin Hamdan Bin Rashid Al Maktoum Hall – The club's main tournament hall can accommodate more than 250 players.
- Light and sound systems – The club has its own light and sound systems that are used during tournaments and other activities. These systems are operated from a control room, where tournament managers and arbiters are also stationed during tournaments.
- Training rooms – Used by instructors and students of the club's chess school. The training rooms are equipped with computers, chess books and other chess training materials.
- Cafeteria
- Leisure area with a pool table
- Library – The club has a collection of chess books, CDs and DVDs, news clippings and other historical material inside its library, which is located on the second floor of the building.
- Offices – The building also houses the offices of the club's officials on the second floor.

== Tournaments ==
The club organizes several international and local tournaments each year

- Dubai Open Chess Tournament – An annual tournament organized and hosted by the club since 1999 that has become one of the strongest open tournaments in the world. It is also notable for attracting young players who would later become among the best in the world. Former world champion Magnus Carlsen of Norway earned his final grandmaster norm in the tournament in 2004. Wesley So, one of the world's top ten players as of the August 2015 FIDE World Rankings, won his first major international open tournament title when he topped the Dubai Open in April 2008, just a few months before he turned 15. The 2015 edition of the championship in 2014 was won by Turkish grandmaster Dragan Solak.
- Allegiance to Zayed Chess Tournament – A rapid chess tournament held during the month of Ramadan.
- Dubai Juniors Chess Championship – An annual tournament open to players 14 years old and below.
- UAE National Day Chess Tournament – The club hosts various tournaments to commemorate the UAE's founding anniversary on December 2 of each year.

Other international tournaments that have been hosted by Dubai Chess and Culture Club

- World Rapid and Blitz Championship in 2014
- 27th Chess Olympiad in 1986, which was considered at the time as the biggest sporting event hosted by the UAE.
- Youth Blitz World Chess championship in 1985
- Credit Swiss Chess Masters Tournament in 1994
- FIDE Active Chess Grand Prix in 2002
- Asian Cities Teams Chess Championships, also called the Dubai Cup, in 1996

== Members ==
The club has produced the UAE's first chess grandmaster, Taleb Moussa, who earned the title in 2004. The UAE's first chess world champion was also from the club, Saeed Saeed Ahmed, who won the Under-14 championship in the 1981 World Youth Championship in Xalapa, Mexico. Members of the club who have earned the FIDE International Master title are Saeed Saeed Ahmed, Nasser Ahmed Saeed and Mansoor Abdullah Mohammed.

=== Achievements ===
The club has won a total of 96 medals – including 30 gold medals – in pan-Arab, Asian, World and Olympic competitions. The club maintains a list on its website of members who have won medals in various international competitions. GM Taleb Moussa and FM Saeed Ishaq hold the distinction of having won the most number of medals while representing the UAE in international competitions, each with nine, followed by IM Saeed Ahmad Saeed with eight medals.

=== Contribution to chess world ===
The adoption of the rapid chess format was attributed to the club's former chairman and former UAE Chess Federation president Mohamed Ghobash during his tenure as FIDE vice-president. Rapid chess is now one of the official events in the FIDE annual calendar and has its own international rating list.
