= Renier González =

Cuban-American chess grandmaster (born 1972)

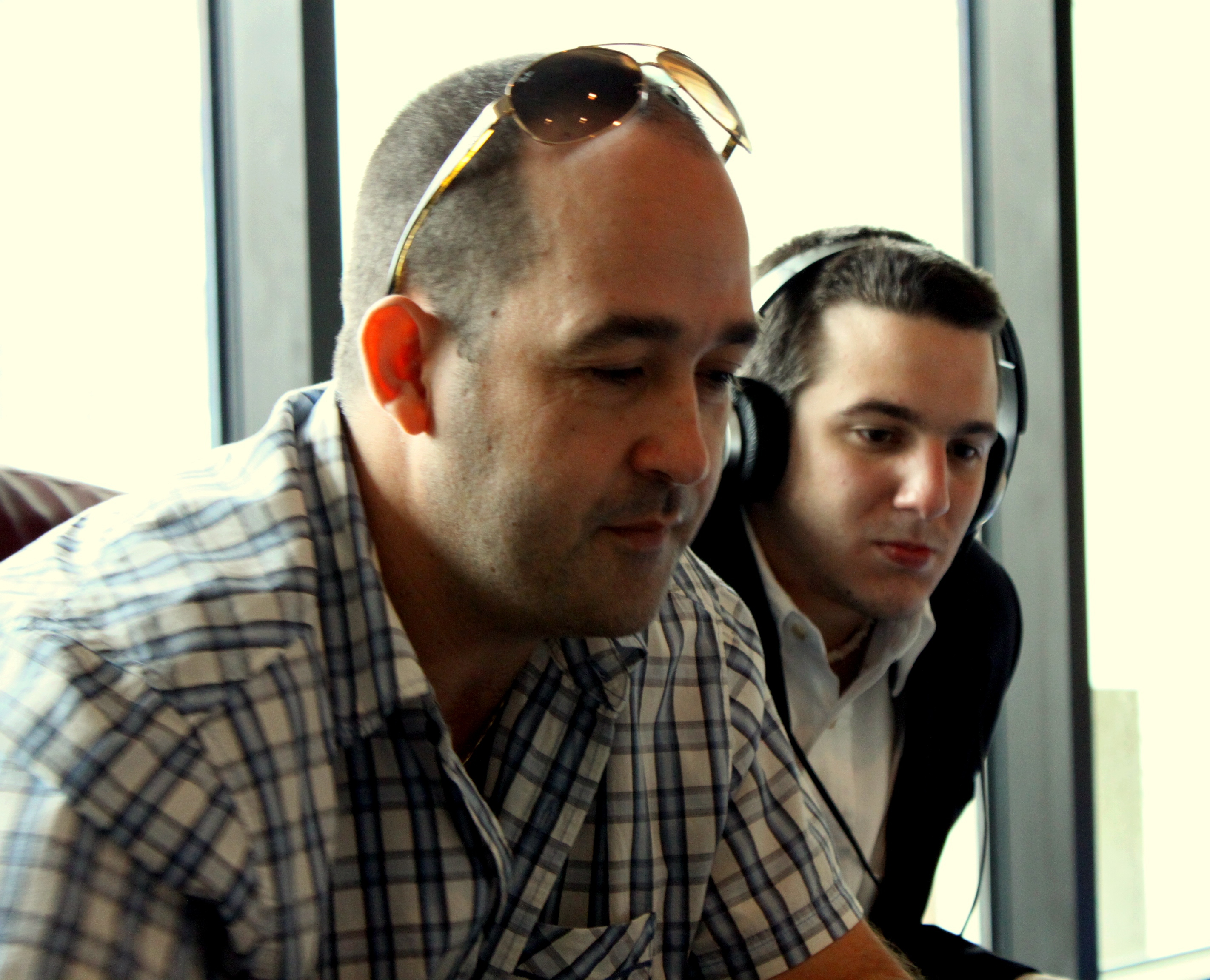
- González (left) with Axel Bachmann in 2009

Personal information
- Born: November 21, 1972 (age 53) Matanzas, Cuba

Chess career
- Country: Cuba (until 2004); United States (since 2004)
- Title: Grandmaster (2008)
- FIDE rating: 2419 (October 2026)
- Peak rating: 2560 (January 1996)

Renier González (born November 21, 1972) is a Cuban-American chess grandmaster.

== Chess career ==
González grew up in Cuba and began playing chess in the second grade, later playing for the national team. He defected from Cuba to the United States in 1999 and began living in Florida, where he taught chess at Nova Southeastern University and Pine Crest School.

In March 2004, he transferred chess federations from Cuba to the United States. Prior to this, he was the top ranked chess player in Cuba. In 2004, he achieved norms at the Mashantucket Open and at the Lindsborg Open. In 2007, he achieved his final norm at the Banyoles International Open, where he finished first and tied with grandmasters José González García, Mihail Marin, and Levan Aroshidze. Afterwards, he joined Miami Dade College's chess team as the captain. In 2008, he was awarded the Grandmaster title.

In May 2018, he provided training for the Bahamas Chess Federation's members for the 43rd Chess Olympiad.

He served as the captain of the Bahamas Chess Federation's open section team for the 44th Chess Olympiad in 2022.

In October 2022, he won the Michigan Chess Association men's championships.

== Personal life ==
González resides in Jonesville, Michigan.
