= Uruguayan Chess Federation =

National organisation for chess

- Founded: 1926
- Headquarters: Montevideo
- (Uruguay)

The Uruguayan Chess Federation (Spanish: Federación Uruguaya de Ajedrez – FUA) is the national organisation for chess in Uruguay. It is affiliated with the World Chess Federation.

Established in 1926, its headquarters are in Montevideo. Its current chairperson is Carlos Milans.

It organizes the Uruguayan Chess Championship once a year.
