= All Assam Chess Association =

Administrative body for chess in Assam, India

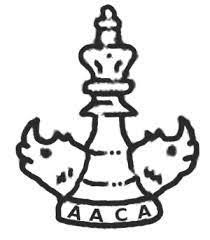
- Official logo of AACA
- Abbreviation: AACA
- Formation: 1960
- Type: Sports organisation
- Legal status: Association
- Purpose: Chess
- Headquarters: Chandmari, Guwahati Chess Academy, Guwahati, Assam
- Location: Around Assam
- Region served: Entire Assam
- Members: 32 affiliated district associations
- Official language: English and Assamese
- President: Kandarpa Kalita
- Affiliations: All India Chess Federation
- Staff: 22
- Website: Official Website

The All Assam Chess Association (Assamese: সদৌ অসম দবা সন্থা) is a registered (under the Societies Registration Act: XXI of 1860, Number 1347 of 1981–82) chess association of the Assam state of India. It was formed in the late 1960s by Bodiyuz Zaman from Jorhat. The first president of the association was Kamakhya Prasad Tripathi. It is affiliated with the All India Chess Federation and officially accredited by the Fédération Internationale des Échecs, (FIDE).

== Affiliates ==
Till date AACA has managed to establish district affiliates in each of Assam's districts. It has no less than 14 Districts out of a possible 23 districts, as well as various chess organizations under its affiliation. The district affiliates and organizations are even able to send players to participate regularly in National and International chess tournaments and events. Here is a list of the affiliated units:

- Barpeta District Chess Association
- Cachar District Chess Association
- Dibrugarh District Chess Association
- Duliajan Chess Academy, Duliajan Club
- Gauhati Town Club Chess Foundation
- Golaghat District Chess Association
- Guwahati Chess Association
- Hailakandi District Chess Association
- Hojai District Chess Association
- Jorhat District Chess Association
- Kaliabor District Chess Association
- Kamrup District (Rural) Chess Association
- Karimganj District. Chess Association
- Kokrajhar District Chess Association
- Mangaldoi District Chess Association
- Morigaon District Chess Association
- Nagaon District Chess association
- North Lakhimpur District Chess Association
- Oil India Ltd., Duliajan
- P. C. Borooah Chess Academy
- Sivasagar District Chess Association
- Tezpur District Chess Association
- Tinsukia District Chess Association

== Events ==
From 1 to 7 July 2003, the AACA, with the help of the Alekhine Chess Club of Calcutta, organized the Telegraph chess championship at the Netaji Vidyapith Railway Higher Secondary School in Maligaon. The event was the fourth Guwahati edition of The Telegraph School Chess Championship.
