= Manitoba Chess Association =

The Manitoba Chess Association, headquartered in Winnipeg, Manitoba, Canada is the official organization for rated chess tournaments in Manitoba.

== History ==
The Winnipeg Chess Club was founded in 1895, and before long it was one of the leading chess centres in the country. Winnipeg began beating bigger cities in telegraphic matches, and Magnus Smith emerged as the strongest player of the era. Soon after it was founded in 1919, the Winnipeg Jewish Chess Club continued the tradition of nurturing strong local players. The strongest of the strong was Abe Yanofsky, who went on to win eight Canadian championships and became the first player in the British Empire to earn the grandmaster title. The Winnipeg and Jewish clubs merged more than 30 years ago, and presently the local CFC affiliated organization is the Manitoba Chess Association which operates tournaments in several locations, but primarily at the University of Winnipeg.

== Current ==
The Manitoba Chess Association maintains a website which contains upcoming tournament information, tournament results, games library, photo gallery, and more.

There are also a number of related Manitoba chess weblogs. These include the Chess Manitoba blog edited by Tony Boron at , the Manitoba Junior Chess blog edited by Jim Green at .
