= All Tripura Chess Association =

- Official logo of ATCA
- Abbreviation: ATCA
- Formation: 1975
- Type: Governing body of Chess in Tripura
- Legal status: Association
- Purpose: Chess
- Region served: Tripura
- Members: Affiliated units
- Official language: English
- Affiliations: All India Chess Federation

The All Tripura Chess Association (ATCA) is the apex body for the game of chess in Tripura, India. It was formed in 1974 and is affiliated with the All India Chess Federation.

== History ==
The All Tripura Chess Association was created in 1974 and initially had the following persons as administrative representatives : Pranab Kumar Ghosh (President), Kanti Kumar Chakraborty (Secretary), Sudhir Dasgupta (Treasurer).

The association organizes national and regional level tournaments. It organized the National B Championship in 1982, the National A Championship in 1983 and the 5th North Eastern Chess Championship in 1986.

In April 2017, the Tripura Chess Club was created by Tripura's chess players to develop the game of chess throughout the state.
