= Academic Chess =

Chess program in the United States

- Formation: 1994
- Type: Elementary in-school and afterschool educational program
- Headquarters: Laguna Hills, California
- Region served: California, Nevada, Utah
- CEO: Eric Hicks
- Website: academicchess.com

Academic Chess is a non-profit program founded in 1994 that teaches elementary-aged students how to play chess. It produced many United States Chess Federation-ranked players, including Nicholas Nip, who in 2008 became the youngest chess master in history at age nine. Academic Chess has taught more than 100,000 children in California, Nevada and Utah.

== History ==
Academic Chess was founded by Eric Hicks, a native of Hawthorne, California. He was ranked among the top 100 players for his age group. He graduated from the University of California, Berkeley with a degree in English.

During his time at the college, he taught chess to young children, he was an instructor at The Berkeley School of Chess and gave particular attention inner-city youths who were most at-risk. After graduating from Berkeley, Hicks took a job writing software manuals but in his spare time he went back to teaching chess at the Las Palmas Elementary School in San Clemente. Other schools expressed interest in Hicks’ chess program and the Las Palmas Elementary School's teachers and administration recommended his instructional methods. Hicks taught other schools in the district.

Hicks founded Academic Chess in 1994. It has taught over 500,000 students and was one of the first independent afterschool programs in California. It is in 200 California, Nevada and Utah schools during school hours and afterschool. The program operates a summer program, as well as "Friday Knight Tournaments".

Academic Chess teaches children in elementary school the basics of chess by giving the pieces backstories to explain their movements, with rhyming and music devices.

== Students ==
One of the most famous members of Academic Chess was Nicholas Nip. In 2008, Nip broke the standing record at the time for the youngest US Chess Federation Master at 9 years and 11 months and was coached by Hicks and his wife, Lina Vark and was enrolled in Academic Chess programs from the time he was in kindergarten. Hicks saw Nip's potential when he was kindergarten and he defeated nine established masters before attaining the rank, progressing from Expert to Master in less than a year.

Other students Academic Chess helped to develop into USCF Masters include Kyle Shin and Alex Costello, among others.

Hicks stated that his primary goal is to introduce chess to a wide range of public and private schools, serving students of all ability levels and needs.
