= All India Chess Federation =

Administrative body for chess in India

- Sport: Chess
- Jurisdiction: India
- Abbreviation: AICF
- Founded: 1951; 75 years ago
- Affiliation: FIDE
- Regional affiliation: Asian Chess Federation
- Headquarters: New Delhi
- President: Nitin Narang

Official website
- www.aicf.in

The All India Chess Federation is the administrative body for the game of chess in India. Founded in 1951, the association is affiliated to the Asian Chess Federation and the International Chess Federation. Nitin Narang is the president of the federation. AICF's headquarters are in New Delhi.

Indian chess has players like Viswanathan Anand, Koneru Humpy, Gukesh Dommaraju, Arjun Erigaisi, Divya Deshmukh, Vidit Gujrathi, Harika Dronavalli, Praggnanandhaa Rameshbabu, and Vaishali Rameshbabu, among others. The organisation manages men's and women's chess.

== History ==
The All India Chess Federation was registered on 12 December 1958 and was registered as a Society under the Societies Registration act of 1860.

A new administration was formed, via an election of office bearers, on 10 March 2024 where Mr. Nitin Narang was elected as the president of the AICF.

In August 2022, AICF hosted the 44th Chess Olympiad in Chennai, India, which was the first Chess Olympiad ever to take place in the country. The event was organised by AICF in association with the International Chess Federation (FIDE) and the Tamil Nadu Government. Sanjay Kapoor, ex-AICF president, was the President of the Organising Committee for the 44th Chess Olympiad, and ex-AICF Secretary, Bharat Singh Chauhan was the Tournament Director.

== Charges of bureaucratic interference ==
AICF has been repeatedly accused of bureaucratic interference. In October 2009, chess Grandmaster Humpy Koneru (then female world No. 2) accused the AICF secretary DV Sundar of preventing her from participating in the 37th Chess Olympiad in Turin. The same year the AICF was accused of arbitrarily banning grandmaster G N Gopal for not playing in a match (the ban was subsequently revoked).

In 2012 the AICF president N Srinivasan was criticised for not supporting Viswanathan Anand in World Chess Championship 2010, by not trying to host the match in India.

However, things appear to be changing for better since the present management took over on January 4, 2021. The new AICF President, Sanjay Kapoor, and Secretary, Bharat Singh Chauhan have taken a slew of measures to ensure that the Federation actively focuses on promoting Chess sport in the country and works towards empowering the players.

== Affiliates ==
Till date the federation has more than 30 affiliated state associations and 10 special members Here is a list of them:

=== Affiliated state bodies ===
- All Arunachal Pradesh Chess Association
- All Assam Chess Association
- All Bihar Chess Association
- All Jammu and Kashmir Chess Association
- All Jharkhand Chess Association
- All Odisha Chess Association
- All Tripura Chess Association
- Andaman and Nicobar Chess Association
- Andhra Chess Association
- Chess Association of Kerala
- Chandigarh Chess Association
- Chhattisgarh Pradesh Shatranj Sangh
- Dev Bhoomi Chess Association
- Delhi Chess Association
- Gujarat State Chess Association
- Goa Chess Association
- Himachal Pradesh State Chess Association
- Karnataka Chess Association
- Maharashtra Chess Association
- Manipur Chess Development Association
- Meghalaya Chess Association
- Mizoram Chess Association
- Madhya Pradesh Chess Ad-Hoc Committee
- Nagaland Chess Association
- Pondicherry State Chess Association
- Punjab State Chess Association
- Rajasthan Chess Association
- Sarba Bangla Daba Sangstha
- Sikkim Chess Association
- Tamil Nadu State Chess Association
- Haryana Chess Association
- Telangana State Chess Association
- Uttar Pradesh Chess Sports Association

=== Special units ===
- Life Insurance Corporation
- All India Reserve Bank Sports and Cultural
- BSNL Sports and Cultural Board
- Defence Accounts Sports Control Board
- Major Ports Sports Control Board
- Railway Sports Promotion Board
- KIIT University
- All India Chess Federation for the Blind
- Petroleum Sports Control Board
- Services Sports Control Board

== Events ==
AICF has also played host to a number of major world events in India. Some of them are:

- World Junior Championships
- Commonwealth Chess Championship
- Asian Team Championships
- 44th Chess Olympiad

== See also ==
- Chess in India
