= Open event at the 44th Chess Olympiad =

2022 Chess tournament

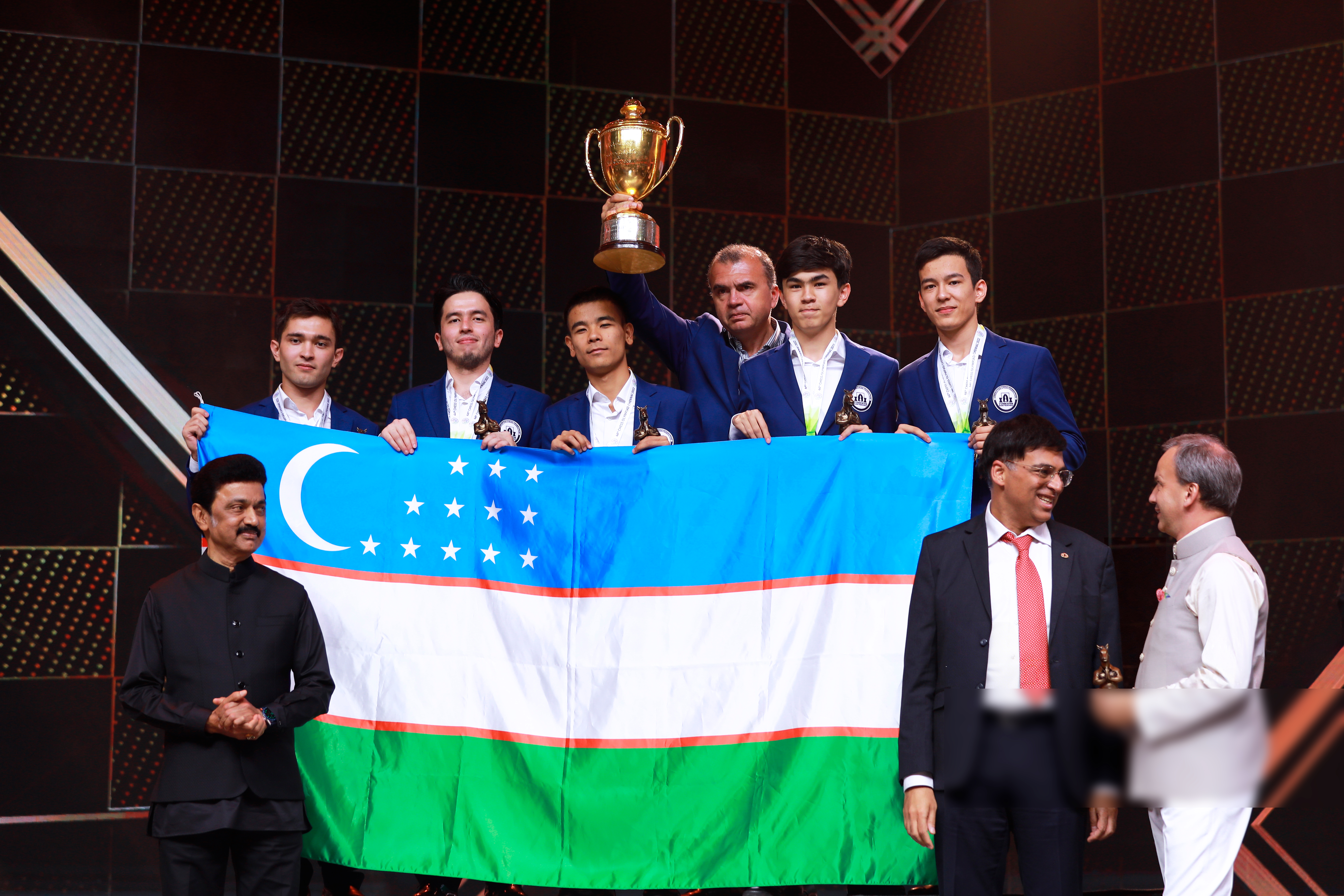
- Uzbekistan's captain Ivan Sokolov raising the Hamilton Russell Cup
- Host city: Mahabalipuram, Chennai
- Country: India
- Nations: 186
- Teams: 188
- Athletes: 937
- Dates: 29 July – 9 August 2022
- Main venue: Four Points by Sheraton

Medalists

Team
- 1st place, gold medalist(s): Uzbekistan
- 2nd place, silver medalist(s): Armenia
- 3rd place, bronze medalist(s): India

Individual
- Board 1: (India) Gukesh D
- Board 2: (India) Nihal Sarin
- Board 3: (England) David Howell
- Board 4: (Uzbekistan) Jahongir Vakhidov
- Reserve: (Poland) Mateusz Bartel

The open event at the 44th Chess Olympiad was held from 29 July to 9 August 2022. It was contested by a record number of 188 teams, representing 186 nations. India, as host nation, fielded three teams. A total of 937 players participated in the open event.

Uzbekistan won the gold medal in the Open event, which was their first overall medal in the Chess Olympiads. English player David Howell had the highest score for an individual player in the Open event, scoring 7½ out of a possible 8 points with a performance rating of 2898. Other players who won individual gold medals include Gukesh D of India-2 on board one who scored 9 out of 11 with a performance rating of 2867, Nihal Sarin also of India-2 on board two who scored 7½ of 10 with a performance rating of 2774, Jahongir Vakhidov of Uzbekistan on board four who scored 6½ out of 8 with a performance rating of 2813, and Mateusz Bartel of Poland as a reserve player who scored 8½ out of 10 points with a performance rating of 2778.

== Competition format and calendar ==
The tournament was played in a Swiss-system format. The time control for all games was 90 minutes for the first 40 moves, after which an additional 30 minutes were granted and increment of 30 seconds per move was applied from the first move. Players were permitted to offer a draw at any time. A total of 11 rounds were played, with all teams playing in every round.

In each round, four players from each team faced four players from another team; teams were permitted one reserve player who could be substituted between rounds. The four games were played simultaneously on four boards, scoring 1 game point for a win and ½ game point for a draw. The scores from each game were summed together to determine which team won the round. Winning a round was worth 2 match points, regardless of the game point margin, while drawing a round was worth one match point. Teams were ranked in a table based on match points. Tie-breakers for the table were i) the Sonneborn–Berger system; ii) total game points scored; iii) the sum of the match points of the opponents, excluding the lowest one.

Tournament rounds started on 29 July and ended with the final round on 9 August. All rounds began at 15:00 IST (UTC+5:30), except for the final round which began at 10:00 IST (UTC+5:30). There was one rest day at the tournament—on 4 August—after the sixth round.

All dates are IST (UTC+5:30)

1	Round	RD	Rest day

July/August	29th Fri	30th Sat	31st Sun	1st Mon	2nd Tue	3rd Wed	4th Thu	5th Fri	6th Sat	7th Sun	8th Mon	9th Tue
Tournament round	1	2	3	4	5	6	RD	7	8	9	10	11

== Teams and players ==
The open section of the tournament was contested by a record number of 188 teams, representing 186 nations. India, as host country, fielded three teams.

The tournament featured five out of the top ten players from the FIDE rating list published in July 2022. World Champion Magnus Carlsen played on the top board for his native Norway. Former World Champion Viswanathan Anand did not play for the host country and decided to mentor the team instead. Ian Nepomniachtchi and Ding Liren, the contenders for the title in the World Chess Championship 2023, missed the tournament because of Russia's suspension and China's withdrawal, respectively. Other top players who skipped the Olympiad include France's Alireza Firouzja and Maxime Vachier-Lagrave, with the latter citing the unfavourable weather conditions as reason for their decision, Teimour Radjabov withdrew from playing for his native Azerbaijan shortly before the start of the tournament due to the after-effects of a COVID-19 infection that he contacted after returning from the Candidates Tournament 2022, Lê Quang Liêm was also missing from the leaderboard since Vietnam did not send a team for the open event, and Richárd Rapport being in the middle of a federation change to Romania could not represent Hungary. On the other hand, Fabiano Caruana, Levon Aronian and Wesley So, all ranked in the top ten, played for the United States.

In the absence of Russia and China, the United States were clear favourites with an average rating of 2771, which was one rating point less than the average of the team at the Batumi Chess Olympiad. The new names in the line-up from the team that won a gold and a silver medal at the previous two Chess Olympiads were Levon Aronian and Leinier Domínguez who switched federations after the previous Chess Olympiad, while Fabiano Caruana, Wesley So and Sam Shankland make up the rest. Viswanathan Anand described the team as "breathtaking", and top-board Dutch player Anish Giri said that the team "not dominating the Olympiad would be a shocker". The host nation India had the second strongest team with an average pre-tournament rating of 2696, consisting of Vidit Santosh Gujrathi and Pentala Harikrishna, Arjun Erigaisi, S. L. Narayanan and Krishnan Sasikiran. Norway took the third place in the seedings with an average rating of 2692 thanks to having Magnus Carlsen on the team. Other pre-tournament favourites included Spain with Alexei Shirov on the top board and Poland led by the winner of the Chess World Cup 2021 Jan-Krzysztof Duda. The young squads of Germany, Uzbekistan and especially India's second team with the prodigies R Praggnanandhaa, Nihal Sarin and Gukesh D were also expected to surprise.

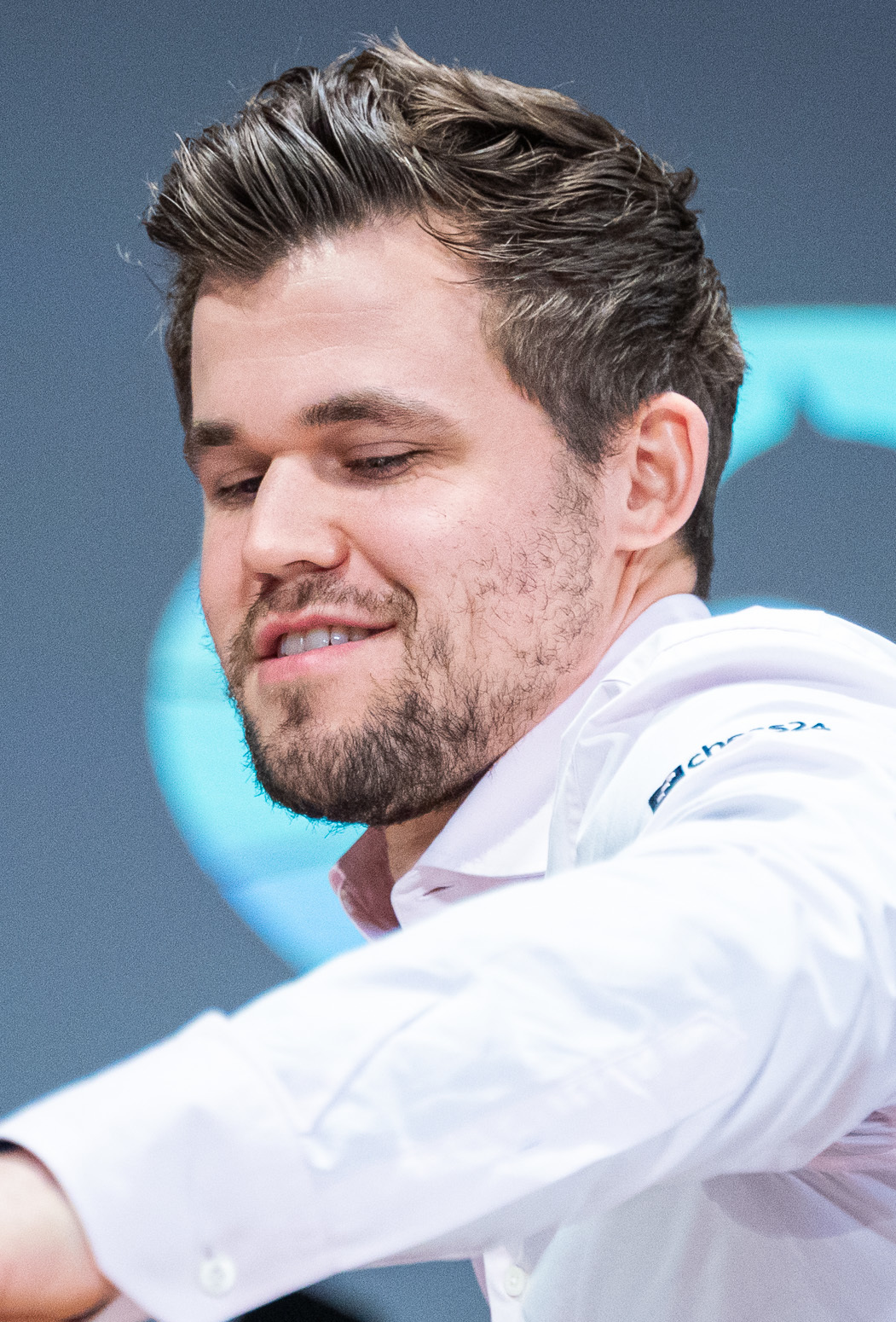
World Champion and world no. 1 Magnus Carlsen played on board one for Norway

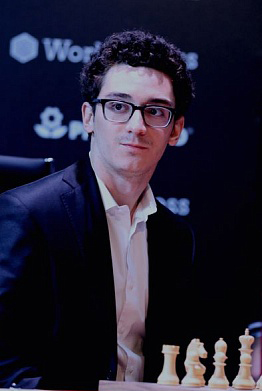
World no. 4 Fabiano Caruana played on board one for the United States

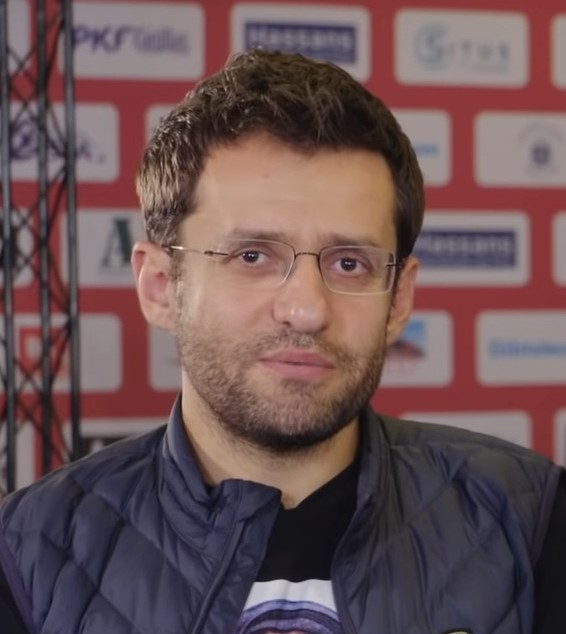
World no. 5 Levon Aronian played on board two for the United States

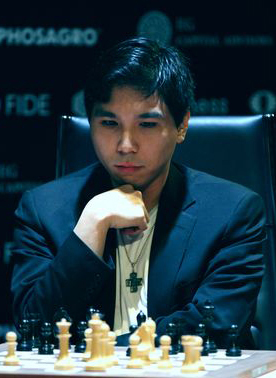
World no. 6 Wesley So played on board three for the United States

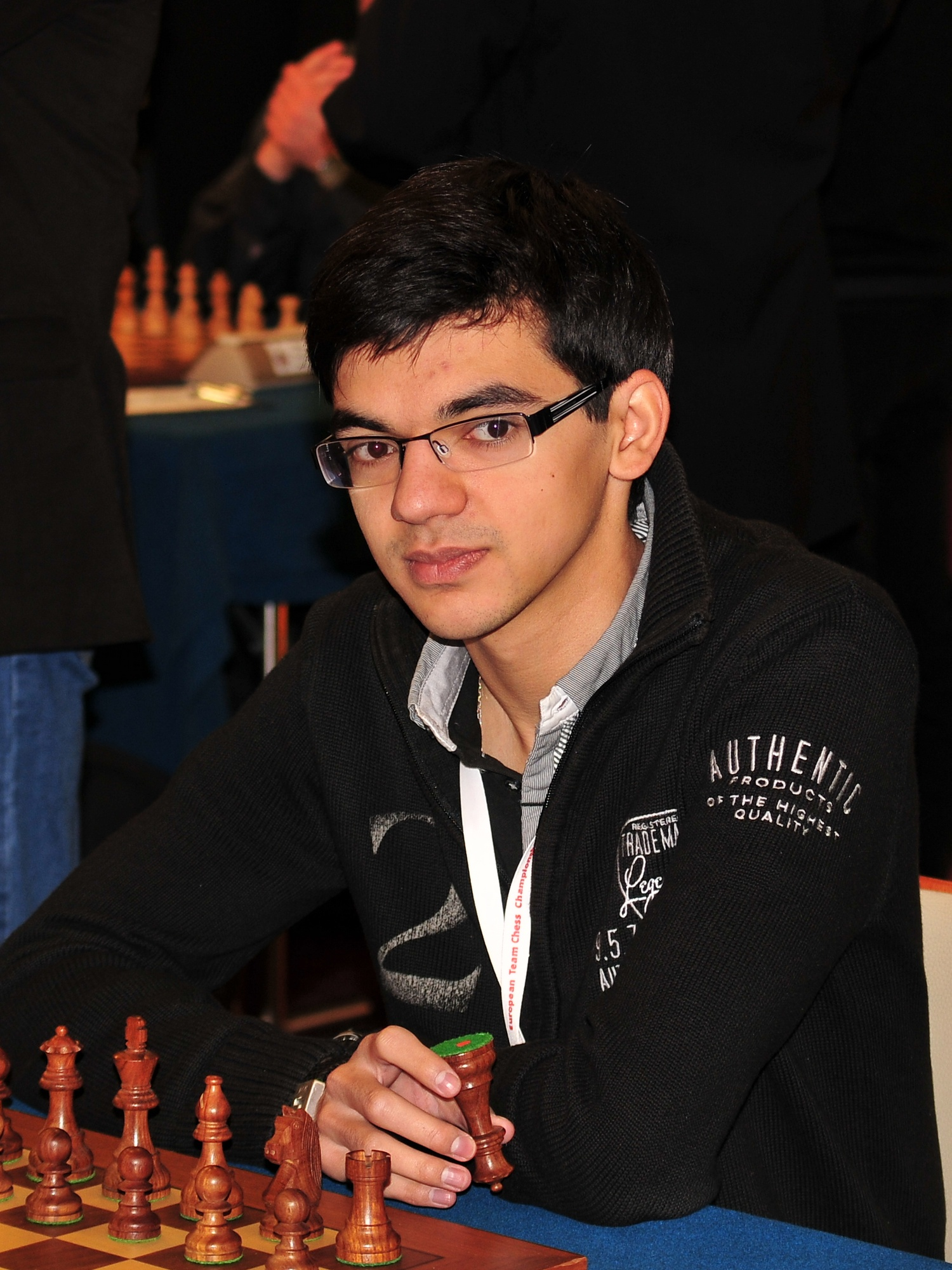
World no. 10 Anish Giri played on board one for the Netherlands

== Rounds ==
=== Round 1 ===
Silva vs. Aronian

Position: b8 black rook, d8 black queen, e8 black bishop, f8 black bishop, g8 black king, f7 black pawn, d6 white queen, e6 black pawn, g6 black pawn, a5 black pawn, b5 white knight, c5 black pawn, h5 black pawn, a4 white pawn, c4 white pawn, b3 white rook, f3 white pawn, h3 white pawn, g2 white pawn, b1 white rook, h1 white king

This is the position after 41... Bf8 in which players agreed to a draw. White could have exchanged queens to enter an endgame with a big advantage.

The first round went in line with the expectations and a total of 76 out of 92 matches ended 4–0. Among the top favourites, India, Spain, Azerbaijan and Poland blanked Zimbabwe, Wales, Algeria and Syria, respectively. The top-ranked team of the United States conceded a half point to Angola after Levon Aronian drew with the Black pieces on board one against David Silva. Aronian played risky in the middlegame and ended up in a position being an exchange down. However, his opponent accepted the draw offer after move 41 in a position which was arguably winning for him (see diagram).

World Champion Magnus Carlsen rested in the first round, but his team did not have problems beating Lebanon 3½–½. Johan-Sebastian Christiansen got in trouble in his game as Black on the third board after he had misplayed the position, but he was eventually able to reach a drawn position upon threefold repetition. One of the biggest upsets in the first round happened in the match between Guyana and Andorra, where Guyana's Anthony Drayton Huayan defeated Jordi Fluvia, who was rated 500 points better than his opponent. There was great fight in Alexei Shirov's game against Grzegorz Toczek of Wales, but Shirov managed to score a win in an attacking style, sacrificing a piece to catch his opponent's King in the centre.

=== Round 2 ===
Carlsen vs. Meier

Position: h8 black king, c5 black queen, f5 white queen, g5 white king, h5 white pawn, g4 white pawn

In this position, Meier lost defensive coordination by playing 78... Qe3+?. Instead, 78... Qc7!! would have held despite being two pawns down.

Most of the favourites scored their second victories in the second round even though the matches were closer. A total of 43 teams continued their winning streak and nine of them had perfect scores after scoring a clean 4–0 victory again. On the first table, India scored a convincing 3½–½ win against the substantially weakened Moldova, which miss Victor Bologan and Viorel Iordăchescu, with only Arjun Erigaisi drawing his game on the second board. The United States had a tough clash with Paraguay on the second table but managed to edge them out by 2½–1½ thanks to Leinier Domínguez who scored the only win in the match with the White pieces on the third board. Fabiano Caruana made his debut at his 30th birthday with a safe draw against Axel Bachmann on the top board. Wesley So and Sam Shankland also drew their games. This round also saw the World Champion Magnus Carlsen playing his first game at the Olympiad against Georg Meier who represents Uruguay. Carlsen won a pawn shortly before entering a queen endgame, which was drawn according to the engines, but he continued trying. The position was still a draw even after he got a two-pawn advantage, but Meier made a decisive mistake to let Carlsen grind out a win (see diagram). Norway ultimately won the match 4–0.

In the other matches involving top-seeded teams, Spain scored a 3½–½ victory against Belgium led by junior Grandmaster Daniel Dardha, while Poland, Azerbaijan and the Netherlands all won their matches against Colombia, Philippines and Portugal. India-2 whitewashed Estonia to extend their perfect score from the first round, while Ukraine have also recorded their second 4–0 victory against Albania. Bulgaria, whose team does not feature its top players at this Olympiad, upset Croatia by scoring a huge 3½–½ victory. Only Ivan Šarić on the top board was able to draw his game as White against Momchil Petkov. The biggest surprise of the day was perhaps Zambia's minimal match win against Denmark. On the top three boards, three Zambian International Masters drew against three Danish Grandmasters, whereas Nase Lungu checkmated Martin Haubro with the White pieces on the lowest board.

=== Round 3 ===
Harikrishna vs. Mastrovasilis

Position: a8 black knight, c8 black rook, f8 black rook, g8 black king, e7 black queen, f7 black pawn, g7 black pawn, a6 black bishop, e6 black pawn, h6 black pawn, a5 black pawn, d5 black pawn, e5 white pawn, a4 white pawn, b4 black bishop, d4 white pawn, f4 white bishop, g4 white knight, h4 white pawn, g3 white pawn, f2 white pawn, g2 white bishop, a1 white rook, c1 white rook, d1 white queen, g1 white king

Harikrishna sacrificed his bishop by playing 24. Bxh6! in this position. The game continued with 24... gxh6 25. Nf6+ Kg7 26. Qg4+ Kh8 27. Qf4 Kg7 28. Bxd5! Bd3 29. Nh5+ Kh7 30. Be4+ and Black resigned.

The number of teams which have won all their matches after three rounds reduced to 20, with India-2 being the only team with a perfect score of 12 wins out of 12 games. The team consisting of young players outclassed Switzerland 4–0 even though it did not seem realistic given that Yannick Pelletier had a big advantage with a safer king and better structure in his game against R Praggnanandhaa. However, the young Indian player posed problems in a difficult position and managed to force his opponent to error-prone play while short on time that eventually cost him the game after 67 moves. After the game, Praggnanandhaa confessed:

I have played badly, and this point doesn’t give me any joy. I struggled throughout this game in a bad position and I feel sorry for my opponent.

The first Indian team scored their third match victory after beating Greece 3–1 thanks to the wins scored by Pentala Harikrishna and Arjun Erigaisi with the White pieces. Harikrishna played an impressive attacking game against Dimitrios Mastrovasilis with a twin bishop sacrifice to open up the position around his opponent's king and snatch the win (see diagram). In a similar fashion as the top team of the host nation, the top-seeded team of the United States defeated Georgia 3–1. Levon Aronian and Sam Shankland with the White pieces converted small advantages to victories, whereas Fabiano Caruana and Leinier Domínguez drew their games as Black. Aronian played a great game in which he dominated his opponent with two rooks and a knight against two rooks and a bishop. Poland, Azerbaijan and the Netherlands scored their third wins in a row with Jan-Krzysztof Duda, Shakhriyar Mamedyarov and Anish Giri all winning their first games at the Olympiad.

Norway were surprised by the well-balanced team of Italy, who scored a clear 3–1 victory, with two wins on the lower boards where Lorenzo Lodici beat Jon Ludvig Hammer as White and Francesco Sonis won his game as Black against Johan-Sebastian Christiansen. On the top board, Daniele Vocaturo played a solid game in the Caro–Kann Defence and split the point with Magnus Carlsen. Another surprise of the day was Austria's minimal win over Germany thanks to the victories scored by Felix Blohberger and Dominik Horvath against Liviu-Dieter Nisipeanu and Dmitrij Kollars. The clash between Ukraine and Cuba ended a draw after each team scored one win. Yasser Quesada Pérez defeated Anton Korobov on board one, while his brother Luis Ernesto Quesada lost against Kirill Shevchenko on the third board.

This round was shadowed by the dramatic development with Estonia's fourth-board player Meelis Kanep, who fainted after the fourth hour of play and was rushed to a hospital in an ambulance. His opponent, Jaden Shaw of Jamaica, respectfully agreed to a draw. Kanep's condition in the hospital was reported to be stable.

=== Round 4 ===
Caruana vs. Abdusattorov

Position: c8 white queen, b7 black pawn, e7 black queen, h7 black pawn, a6 black pawn, h6 black king, a5 white pawn, f5 black pawn, c4 black pawn, e4 black rook, g3 black pawn, b2 white pawn, f2 white pawn, g2 white king, d1 white rook

In this position, Caruana played 44. Qxf5? and after 44... Rh4! 45. Kxg3 Rh5 46. Qf4+ Qg5+ 47. Qg4 Qxg4 48. Kxg4 Rg5+ 49. Kf4 Rxa5 Black got a winning endgame. Instead, 44.Rd7! would have given White counterplay.

In the fourth round, only five teams—India-2, Israel, England, Spain and Armenia—scored their fourth consecutive match wins. India-2 continued their impressive run by beating Italy 3–1 with wins on the higher boards scored by Gukesh D over Daniele Vocaturo and Nihal Sarin over Luca Moroni, while Rameshbabu Praggnanandhaa and Raunak Sadhwani conceded the first two draws for the team. Israel upset the Netherlands 2½–1½ thanks to Ilya Smirin's win on the third board against Erwin l'Ami. England scored a big 3½–½ victory over Serbia wherein Michael Adams, Luke McShane and David Howell won their games. Spain inflicted the first loss on an Indian team at the Olympiad by edging out the third Indian team after David Antón Guijarro defeated Abhijeet Gupta, while Armenia beat Austria with a 3–1 scoreline.

On the top tables, the first two seeds India and the United States split the points with France and Uzbekistan, respectively. All four games between the Indian and French players ended peacefully. The top-seeded American team survived a scare against the impressive Uzbek team. Levon Aronian made an easy draw in his game with Nodirbek Yakubboev, while Wesley So won his game against Javokhir Sindarov who played the Benko Gambit. Fabiano Caruana had a bad position against Uzbek prodigy and reigning World Rapid Chess Champion Nodirbek Abdusattorov and, when it seemed that he had found a tactical way out, he allowed his opponent to force a queen trade to get a winning endgame that he easily converted (see diagram). At the end, all eyes were on the game between Sam Shankland and Jahongir Vakhidov in which the American had a lost rook endgame but managed to get the needed half point to force the match end in a draw. In the press conference after the match, Uzbek coach Ivan Sokolov commented:

I would have immediately taken the draw before starting the match, but I think we have fallen short.

After the shocking loss to Italy in the previous round, Norway did not recover and drew their match against Mongolia despite Magnus Carlsen scoring a nice win over Dambasürengiin Batsüren in a sacrificial attacking game on the top board. However, Sugar Gan-Erdene defeated Frode Olav Olsen Urkedal to level the score 2–2 for his team, while Gundavaa Bayarsaikhan agreed to a draw in a winning position against Aryan Tari. In the other matches, Romania and Poland exchanged four draws in their 2–2 tie; Turkey held Azerbaijan to a draw thanks to Sahal Vanap's win over Gadir Guseinov; Canada and Iran played another tied match after Razvan Preotu beat Pouya Idani; Slovakia surprisingly defeated Ukraine 2½–1½ as a result of the wins by Jerguš Pecháč and Viktor Gažík on the top two boards; and Cuba secured a commanding victory over Hungary with wins by Yasser Quesada Pérez and Omar Almeida Quintana.

=== Round 5 ===
Dominguez vs. Rodshtein

Position: d8 black rook, f8 black knight, h8 black king, c7 black pawn, f7 black queen, h7 black pawn, b6 black pawn, d6 black rook, f6 black pawn, g6 black pawn, a5 black pawn, b5 white pawn, c5 black knight, d5 white pawn, e5 black pawn, a4 white pawn, e4 white pawn, g4 white bishop, h4 white knight, c3 white rook, g3 white pawn, h3 white pawn, c2 white queen, f2 white pawn, c1 white rook, g1 white king

This is the position in which Dominguez sacrificed the exchange by playing 30. Rxc5 to open up the position. The game continued with 30... bxc5 31. Qxc5 f5 32. Bf3 Rf6 33. Rc2 Nd7 34. Qxc7 and White won after 54 moves.

India-2 and Armenia were the only teams that extended their winning streak to five matches won in the fifth round. India-2 minimally defeated Spain 2½–1½ thanks to the wins by Gukesh D over Alexei Shirov on the first board and Adhiban Baskaran over Eduardo Iturrizaga on the last board, whereas Nihal Sarin drew with the ever-dangerous David Antón Guijarro and R Praggnanandhaa lost to Jaime Santos Latasa. Gukesh won his fifth consecutive game at the Olympiad after getting decisive advantage from a queenless middlegame with asymmetric pawn structure that emerged from a positional variation in the Sicilian Defence. Armenia edged past England with the only win in the match scored by Hrant Melkumyan, who managed to capitalise on a tactical error by Luke McShane and convert a rook endgame into a full point.

The first Indian team playing on the top table narrowly defeated Romania thanks to Arjun Erigaisi's victory over Mircea Pârligras, while the other three games ended in solid draws. Similarly, the United States snatched a minimal match victory against Israel with the only win scored by Leinier Domínguez over Maxim Rodshtein after Fabiano Caruana, Levon Aronian and Wesley So had all made relatively quick draws. Dominguez won a game in which he barely escaped losing on time with two seconds left on the clock before reaching the time control on the 40th move after he had previously sacrificed the exchange to open up the position (see diagram). France and Poland played a match that ended in a tie wherein Radosław Wojtaszek's win against Laurent Fressinet was offset by Maxime Lagarde's defeat of Wojciech Moranda. Cuba upset Azerbaijan 2½–1½ with two wins on boards two and three scored by Carlos Daniel Albornoz Cabrera over Rauf Mamedov and Luis Ernesto Quesada over Vasif Durarbayli.

In the other matches involving top seeds, Uzbekistan and the Netherlands swept Slovakia and Canada, respectively, with Canada's Eric Hansen losing on time against Anish Giri; Ukraine and Norway conceded only a half point in their victories over Estonia and Zambia; and Iran defeated Turkey 3–1.

=== Round 6 ===
Gukesh vs. Sargissian

Position: f8 black rook, h8 black king, a7 black bishop, c7 black pawn, e7 black queen, f7 black pawn, h7 black pawn, a6 black rook, e6 white pawn, a5 black pawn, f5 black pawn, g5 white rook, b4 black pawn, e3 white pawn, a2 white pawn, b2 white pawn, c2 white queen, d2 white bishop, h2 white pawn, b1 white king, g1 white rook

In this position, Gukesh sacrificed a piece by 25. Bxb4!! to clear the way for his queen to g2. The game continued 25... Qxb4 26. Qg2 Qe4+ 27. Qxe4 fxe4 28. e7! Re8 29. Rg8+! Rxg8 30. Rxg8 Kxg8 31. e8Q and White won after 41 moves.

The main match of the sixth round was the encounter on the top table between co-leaders India-2 and Armenia, the only teams which have scored five match victories in the first five rounds, in which the Armenian team scored a minimal 2½–1½ victory. Samvel Ter-Sahakyan and Robert Hovhannisyan won for Armenia on the lower boards, whereas Gukesh D brought the second Indian team a full point with his win over Gabriel Sargissian on the top board and scored his sixth consecutive game at the Olympiad. Gukesh won his game by forcing a sacrifice for a fierce attack that eventually resulted in promoting the e-pawn (see diagram). Ter-Sahakyan positionally outplayed Adhiban Baskaran in the centre, while Hovhannisyan achieved a win in the Berlin Defence against the well-prepared Raunak Sadhwani in a rook and opposite-coloured bishops endgame.

The first Indian team was held to a draw by Uzbekistan on the second table. Pentala Harikrishna beat Nodirbek Abdusattorov to put India in lead, but Shamsiddin Vokhidov equalised with his win over Krishnan Sasikiran. The top-seeded team of the United States approached the match against Iran with their four highest-rated players for a second round in a row and again narrowly defeated their opponents by 2½–1½. On the top board, Fabiano Caruana scored in the only decisive game against Parham Maghsoodloo, which was the first game in the Olympiad played by players rated above 2700 points. He combined an excellent calculation with a fine-tuned intuitive feel in a position with castling on opposite sites to bring his opponent into a desperate position. In the other games, Levon Aronian and Wesley So quickly drew, while Leinier Domínguez was not able to grind out a win in his game.

In the other matches involving top-seeded teams, Spain and Cuba split the points with four draws, Serbia upset Poland with a win by Robert Markuš over Kacper Piorun, while Peru and Kazakhstan surprised Croatia and Czech Republic with minimal match victories respectively. The Netherlands have edged out Georgia 2½–1½ with wins involving exchange sacrifices on the higher boards by Anish Giri over Baadur Jobava and Jorden van Foreest over Mikheil Mchedlishvili. World Champion Magnus Carlsen scored his fourth win in five games after beating Anton Smirnov, but his Norway minimally lost to Australia as a result of Temur Kuybokarov's win over Aryan Tari and Jon Ludvig Hammer's loss on time.

=== Round 7 ===
So vs. Melkumyan

Position: a8 black rook, d8 black queen, e8 black rook, g8 black king, a7 black pawn, b7 black pawn, d7 black knight, e7 black bishop, f7 black pawn, h7 black pawn, c6 black knight, g6 black pawn, h6 white bishop, d5 black pawn, d4 white pawn, e4 black pawn, c3 white pawn, d3 white bishop, e3 white rook, f3 white queen, g3 white knight, h3 white pawn, a2 white pawn, b2 white pawn, f2 white pawn, g2 white pawn, a1 white rook, g1 white king

This is the position after Melkumyan played 18... е4??. So responded with 19. Rxe4!! (Black cannot accept the sacrifice because of 19... dxe4 20. Qxf7+! Kxf7 21. Bc4+ Kf6 22. Nex4+ Kf5 23. g4+ Kxe4 24. Re1+ Kf3 25. Re3#/Bd5#) and went on to win after 25 moves.

The seventh round featured the clash between Armenia as tournament leaders and the United States as top seeds before the tournament. In a dramatic match with many turnarounds, the match ended in a 2–2 tie with decisive games on all boards. However, the drama started even before the event when Levon Aronian, who won three gold medals for Armenia at the Chess Olympiads, decided to not play against his former teammates. Wesley So was winning after less than 20 moves against Hrant Melkumyan with a rook sacrifice, which would have been followed by a queen sacrifice and mate in six (see diagram). On the top board, Gabriel Sargissian levelled the score by beating Fabiano Caruana, but Leinier Dominguez put the American team again in the lead after defeating Samvel Ter-Sahakyan. The last game in the match played between Sam Shankland and Robert Hovhanissyan took a dramatic course. After Hovhanissyan gained advantage early in the game, Shankland managed to equalise the position, but in a drawish position he touched his king after falsely anticipating that his rival would give a check. The only legal move with the king was losing on the spot, so Shankland immediately resigned and the teams split the points in the match.

On the top table, the first Indian team scored a 3–1 victory over the third team. The decisive games appeared on the lower boards where Arjun Erigaisi beat Abhijeet Gupta after the latter blundered in an equal position and S. L. Narayanan steadily developed a winning kingside attack against Abhimanyu Puranik. The games between Pentala Harikrishna and Surya Ganguly as well as S. P. Sethuraman and Vidit Gujrathi on the top boards were drawn. The second Indian team convincingly defeated Cuba 3½–½ with wins by Gukesh D, Nihal Sarin and R Praggnanandhaa. Gukesh extended his perfect score at the Olympiad to seven victories after obtaining a comfortable position out of the opening with the Black pieces against Carlos Daniel Albornoz Cabrera. In the other matches, France and the Netherlands drew after Maxime Lagarde won for the French and Benjamin Bok for the Dutch team; Germany edged out Serbia 2½–1½ thanks to Dmitrij Kollars who won with an extra pawn in a queen and a minor piece endgame, whereas Matthias Bluebaum, Liviu-Dieter Nisipeanu and Vincent Keymer drew their games; Kazakhstan minimally defeated Spain; and Uzbekistan whitewashed Peru.

=== Round 8 ===
Sargissian vs. Harikrishna

Position: f8 white bishop, a6 black pawn, b6 white king, e6 black king, c5 black pawn, c4 white pawn, d4 black bishop, b3 white pawn, a2 black knight, c2 white bishop

In this position, Harikrishna blundered with 96... Nb4?? (the drawing move order was 96... a5! 97. Kxa5 Kf7 98. Bd6 Nb4 99. Bb1 Ke6 100. Bf8 Kf7). White continued with 97. Bb1 a5 98. Bxc5 Bxc5 99. Kxc5 Kd7 100. Kb6 Kc8 101. Kxa5 Nc6 102. Kb6 and Black resigned.

Both matches that received central attention in the eight round involved teams of the host nation. The first Indian team faced the leading team of Armenia on the top table, whereas India's second team played against the top-seeded team of the United States. Armenia and India played a close match on all boards, but the Armenians narrowly won the battle 2½–1½ thanks to Gabriel Sargissian's win over Pentala Harikrishna on the top board to keep the tournament lead with 15 match points. Sargissian reached an endgame with two bishops versus a bishop and a knight on move 48 in which he was able to push for a win with his long-ranging minor pieces and active king. Harikrishna made the decisive mistake on the 96th move and the game ended decisively after 102 moves (see diagram). On the other boards, Vidit Gujrathi and Hrant Melkumyan drew quickly after the time control, S. L. Narayanan had difficulties against Robert Hovhannisyan but managed to hold after 45 moves, and Samvel Ter-Sahakyan and Arjun Erigaisi ended their game peacefully after 84 moves. In the other top match, the second Indian team snatched a resounding 3–1 victory against the United States with wins by Gukesh D, who scored his eighth full point in a row, over Fabiano Caruana and Raunak Sadhwani over Leinier Domínguez, whereas the games on the other two boards ended in a draw after a very complicated play.

Uzbekistan edged past Germany with the only win in the match scored by Nodirbek Yakubboev against Matthias Bluebaum on the second board to remain in a shared second place with India 2 only a point behind Armenia. Azerbaijan, the Netherlands and Iran constitute the next group of chasers with 13 match points won or two points behind the leaders. Azerbaijan and Iran minimally beat Kazakhstan and France, respectively, while the Netherlands scored defeated Hungary by a 3–1 scoreline. The victories for the Dutch team were scored by Anish Giri on the top board and Max Warmerdam in an attacking game against Gergely Kantor.

=== Round 9 ===
Sindarov vs.Ter-Sahakhyan

Position: c8 black rook, d8 black queen, f8 black rook, g8 black king, b7 black pawn, f7 black pawn, g7 black bishop, h7 black pawn, a6 black pawn, d6 black pawn, e6 black bishop, g6 black pawn, c5 black knight, e5 black knight, a4 white pawn, c4 white pawn, e4 white pawn, f4 white knight, b3 white pawn, e3 white knight, g3 white bishop, h3 white pawn, c2 white bishop, f2 white queen, g2 white pawn, d1 white rook, f1 white rook, h1 white king

Sindarov sacrificed a piece in this position by playing 32. Nf5!, which was followed by 32... gxf5 33. exf5 Bd7 34. Nh5! and White got a position with multiple threats. He went on to win after 49 moves.

In the ninth round, the first-placed team of Armenia suffered a 3–1 loss to Uzbekistan with wins by Javokhir Sindarov and Jahongir Vakhidov on the last boards. Sindarov opened the score by beating Samvel Ter-Sahakyan with a piece sacrifice after the Armenian rejected a draw by repetition (see diagram). Vakhidov scored the second victory for his team after outplaying previously undefeated Robert Hovhannisyan in a rook endgame. Uzbekistan leapfrogged Armenia and took the sole lead in the tournament with 16 match points.

Azerbaijan and India-2 split the points. Shakhriyar Mamedyarov put an end to Gukesh's winning streak with a 34-move draw, while Rauf Mamedov and Nihal Sarin have also drawn their game. Nijat Abasov scored a full point for the Azeri team by beating Raunak Sadhwani in a complicated endgame, whereas R Praggnanandhaa equalised the result after winning against Vasif Durarbayli. The Netherlands and Iran played another tie with four draws. The games on the lower tables between Benjamin Bok and Pouya Idani as well as Max Warmerdam and Seyed Khalil Mousavi were drawn. Anish Giri sacrificed an exchange against Parham Maghsoodloo but was not able to play for more in the endgame, while Amin Tabatabaei sacrificed the exchange in the opening against Jorden van Foreest and got a rook and bishop versus rook endgame that his opponent steadily defended.

The United States edged past Greece 2½–1½ despite Levon Aronian's defeat by Nikolaos Theodorou. Fabiano Caruana recovered after two consecutive losses and beat Dimitrios Mastrovasilis with the Black pieces in the Sveshnikov Variation of the Sicilian Defence, while Wesley So scored the key victory for his team after successfully pressing in an advantageous rook endgame. India convincingly defeated Brazil by 3–1 thanks to the wins by Arjun Erigaisi and Krishnan Sasikiran on the bottom boards. Lithuania held Germany to a draw with the wins on the lower boards by Paulius Pultinevičius and Valery Kazakouski over Rasmus Svane and Dmitrij Kollars, respectively.

=== Round 10 ===
Gukesh vs. Abdusattorov

Position: d8 white queen, g7 black queen, g6 black pawn, e5 white knight, f5 black bishop, h5 black king, b4 white king, c4 white pawn, h4 black pawn, b3 white pawn

This is the position in which Gukesh blundered by playing 72. Nf3??, which allowed Abdusattorov to continue with 72... Qb7+ and win the knight. White resigned immediately afterwards.

The penultimate round featured a dramatic clash between Uzbekistan and India-2 that ended in a draw. Jakhongir Vakhidov and Adhiban Baskaran played a wild draw, while Nodirbek Yakubboev and Nihal Sarin split the point in a relatively quieter game. The Indian team took a 2–1 lead after R Praggnanandhaa defeated Javokhir Sindarov and only the game with between Gukesh D as White and Abdusattorov was still being played. After the Indian missed a couple of winning moves in the middlegame, the players entered a balanced endgame with a queen and a knight versus a queen and a bishop in which Gukesh blundered the knight and let his opponent win the game to bring his team a draw in the match. Uzbekistan retained the lead in the tournament but where caught by Armenia which bounced back after the loss in the previous round and beat Azerbaijan 3–1. Gabriel Sargissian scored a nice victory over Shakhriyar Mamedyarov on the top board after the Azeri went wrong in the early stages of the game, while the second win for the Armenian team came thanks to Robert Hovhannisyan who defeated Nijat Abasov.

The top-seeded team of the United States scored their second consecutive match victory after clearly defeating Turkey by 3–1 with wins by Fabiano Caruana and Leinier Domínguez. India narrowly defeated Iran 2½–1½ mostly because of the win scored by Vidit Gujrathi over Amin Tabatabaei where the uneven play near the time control resulted in a lost endgame for Black. This was Vidit's second win in the tournament after he won in the first round and drew seven games in a row. In the other matches involving potential medal contenders, England and Germany beat Italy and Israel by a 3–1 scoreline, respectively, while Spain minimally defeated the Czech Republic.

=== Round 11 ===
Uzbekistan and Armenia entered into the final round tied for the first place with 17 match points each. The Uzbek team defeated the Netherlands by 2½–1½, while the Armenians beat Spain with the same result. As a result, Uzbekistan kept the superior tie-breaker to win the gold medal, whereas Armenia won the silver medal in the final standings. The second Indian team beat Germany 3–1 to secure the bronze medal.

== Final standings ==
Uzbekistan won the gold medal in the open event, with a total of 19 match points. Their eight wins and three draws made them the only undefeated team in the tournament. Silver medallists Armenia also scored 19 points, but lost the tie-break largely due to their loss to the Uzbek team in the ninth round. The second Indian team won the bronze medal following a strong performance by 16-year-old Gukesh D, who won eight consecutive games in the first eight rounds but blundered a loss to Nodirbek Abdusattorov in their match with the Uzbek team, which proved decisive. Three teams scored 17 match points (seven wins, three draws and one loss each): the first Indian team came fourth, the United States fifth, and Moldova sixth. The heavily favoured US team failed to win a medal due to lacklustre performances from Fabiano Caruana, who suffered three losses, and Levon Aronian, who won only one game in the tournament.

The highest scoring individual player in the Open event was David Howell, playing for England, who scored 7½ out of a possible 8 points (seven wins and one draw) with a performance rating of 2898. Individual gold medals were also given to Gukesh D of India-2, who scored 9 out of 11 with a performance rating of 2867, Nihal Sarin also of India-2 who scored 7½ of 10 with a performance rating of 2774, Jahongir Vakhidov of Uzbekistan who scored 6½ out of 8 with a performance rating of 2813, and Mateusz Bartel of Poland who began the tournament as a reserve player and scored 8½ out of 10 points with a performance rating of 2778.

Open event
#	Country	Players	Average rating	MP	dSB
1st place, gold medalist(s)	Uzbekistan	Abdusattorov, Yakubboev, Sindarov, Vakhidov, Vokhidov	2625	19	435.0
2nd place, silver medalist(s)	Armenia	Sargissian, Melkumyan, Ter-Sahakyan, Petrosyan, Hovhannisyan	2642	19	382.5
3rd place, bronze medalist(s)	India-2	Gukesh, Nihal, Praggnanandhaa, Adhiban, Sadhwani	2649	18	
4	India	Harikrishna, Gujrathi, Arjun, Narayanan, Sasikiran	2696	17	409.0
5	United States	Caruana, Aronian, So, Domínguez, Shankland	2771	17	352.0
6	Moldova	Schitco, Macovei, Hamițevici, Baltag, Cereș	2462	17	316.5
7	Azerbaijan	Mamedyarov, Mamedov, Guseinov, Durarbayli, Abasov	2680	16	351.5
8	Hungary	Erdős, Berkes, Bánusz, Kantor, Ács	2607	16	341.5
9	Poland	Duda, Wojtaszek, Piorun, Moranda, Bartel	2683	16	322.5
10	Lithuania	Laurušas, Stremavičius, Jukšta, Pultinevičius, Kazakouski	2540	16	297.0

Notes

- Average ratings calculated by chess-results.com based in July 2022 ratings.

All board prizes were given out according to performance ratings for players who played at least eight games at the tournament. David Howell on the third board had the best performance of all players in the tournament. The winners of the gold medal on each board are listed in turn:

- Board 1: (India) Gukesh D 2867
- Board 2: (India) Nihal Sarin 2774
- Board 3: (England) David Howell 2898
- Board 4: (Uzbekistan) Jahongir Vakhidov 2813
- Reserve: (Poland) Mateusz Bartel 2778

== See also ==
- Women's event at the 44th Chess Olympiad
