= Baltag =

Baltag is a Romanian surname. Notable people with the surname include:

- Cezar Baltag (1939 – 1997), Romanian poet
- Iulian Baltag (born 1986), Moldovan chess master
- Sabina Baltag (born 2001), Romanian weightlifter
