= Jegor Lashkin =

Moldovan chess grandmaster (born 2003)

Personal information
- Born: September 7, 2003 (age 23) Tiraspol, Moldova

Chess career
- Country: Moldova
- Title: Grandmaster (2025)
- FIDE rating: 2499 (November 2026)
- Peak rating: 2528 (April 2025)

Jegor Lashkin (born 2003) is a Moldovan chess grandmaster.

== Chess career ==
Lashkin won the Moldovan Chess Championship in 2023, finishing on 8.5/9, two points ahead of favourite Vladimir Hamitevici.

In 2024, Lashkin finished fourth in the Sharjah Challengers, after leading five rounds in.

Lashkin qualified to play in the Chess World Cup 2025. He was defeated by Tin Jingyao in the first round.
