= Baciu (disambiguation) =

Baciu is a commune in Cluj County.

Baciu may also refer to:

- Baciu (Olt), a tributary of the Olt in Covasna County
- Baciu (surname), a Romanian surname
- Baciu, a village in Blejești Commune, Teleorman County
- Baciu, a former village in Brașov County, now part of Săcele city
- Baciu, a tributary of the Râul Doamnei (Argeș basin) in Argeș County
