= Wladimir Skulener =

Chess player

Vladimir Skulener
Personal information
- Born: 24 January 1958 (age 68) Bălți, Soviet Union

Chess career
- Country: Soviet Union Germany
- Title: FIDE Master

Vladimir Elikovich Skulener (Russian: Владимир Еликович Скуленер; born January 24, 1958, in Bălți) is a German (formerly Soviet) chess player who won the Moldovan Chess Championship in 1981. FIDE Master.

Trained by Lazar Begelman (1937–2006) in Bălți (Moldova), Skulener participated in ten Moldovan Chess Championships and was awarded the title of Master of Sports of the USSR in chess in 1984. He also participated in two USSR Team Chess Championships (1981, 1985).

He later emigrated to Israel (and played for Madatech Haifa Chess Club) and then to Germany, where he plays for Makkabi Aachen. He lives in Eschweiler. In 2016 he became silver medalist in the German Maccabiah Games in blitz and fast chess.

== Literature ==
Игорь Бердичевский. Шахматная еврейская энциклопедия. Russian Chess House, 2016.
