= Anatoly Lutikov =

Russian chess grandmaster (1933–1989)

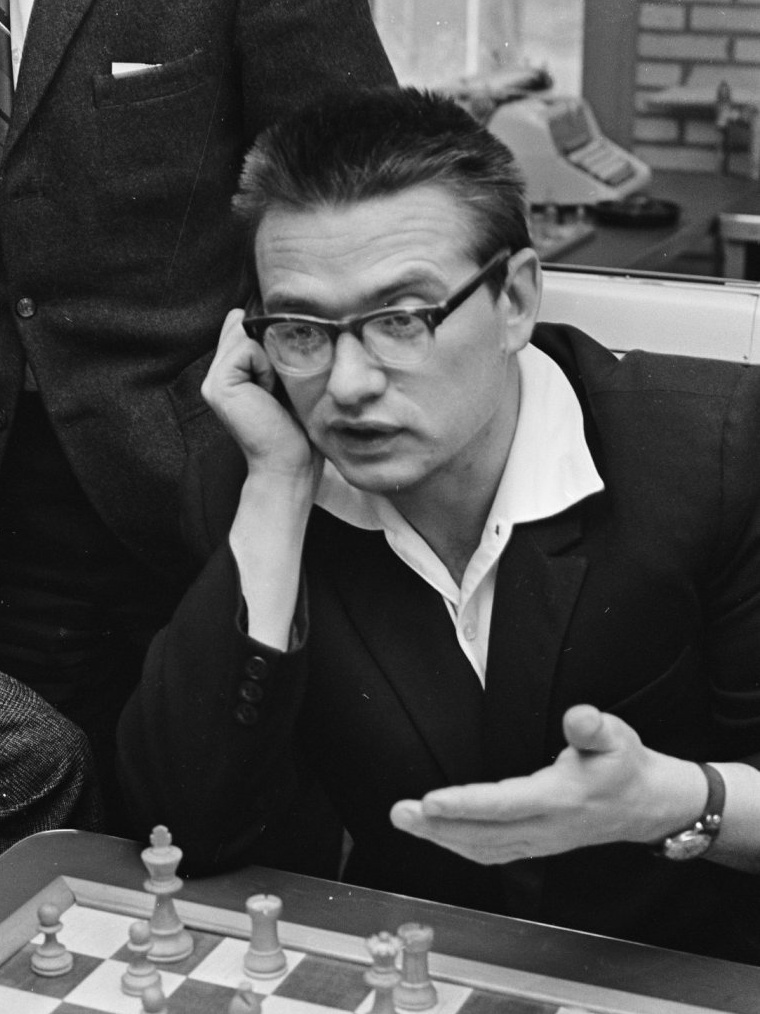
- Lutikov in 1967

Personal information
- Born: 5 February 1933 Leningrad, Soviet Union
- Died: 23 October 1989 (aged 56) Tiraspol, Soviet Union

Chess career
- Country: Soviet Union
- Title: Grandmaster (1974)
- Years active: 1949–1983
- Peak rating: 2545 (July 1972)

Anatoly Lutikov (5 February 1933 – 23 October 1989) was a Russian chess player. He was awarded the International Master title in 1967 and the Grandmaster title in 1974. He won the Moldovan championship six times (1963, 1964, 1965, 1966, 1968, 1977). He came third in the USSR Chess Championship 1968/69, finished second behind Boris Spassky at Wijk aan Zee 1967, was first at Dubna 1971, tied for first at Leipzig 1973 and came first at Albena 1976.
