= Elena Partac =

Moldovan chess player

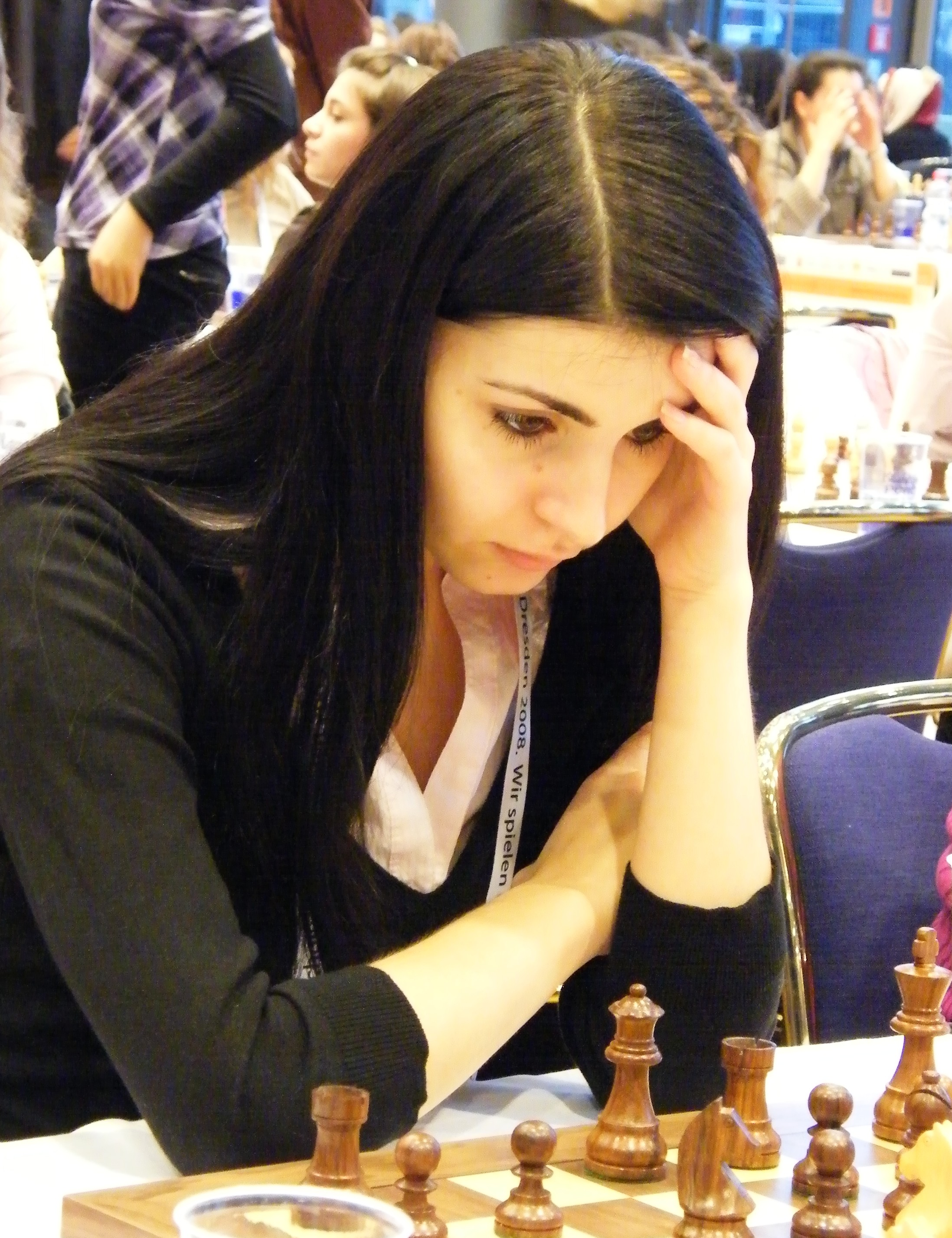
- Partac in 2008

Personal information
- Born: 25 March 1984 (age 42)

Chess career
- Country: Moldova
- Title: Woman Grandmaster (2003)
- Peak rating: 2275 (July 2004)

Elena Partac (born 25 March 1984) is a Moldovan chess player. She is a Woman Grandmaster (WGM) since 2003, her highest rating was 2275 (in July, 2004).

In 2000, she won the bronze medal at the European junior team championship. She was a member of the national team of Moldova in 2002, 2004, 2006, 2008 and 2010, during the Chess Olympiads.

She won the Moldovan women's championship in 2002, 2003, 2006 and 2010.
