= Marios Schinis =

Cypriot chess player (born 1954)

Personal information
- Born: 6 May 1954 (age 72)

Chess career
- Country: Cyprus
- Peak rating: 2230 (January 1989)

Marios Schinis (Greek: Μάριος Σχοινής; born 6 May 1954), is a Cypriot chess player, three-times Cypriot Chess Championship winner (1986, 1990, 1992), Chess Olympiad individual gold medalist (1984).

== Biography ==
From the mid-1980s to the mid-1992 Marios Schinis was one of the best chess players in Cyprus. He won the Cypriot Chess Championships three times (1986, 1990, 1992).

Marios Schinis played for Cyprus in the Chess Olympiads:

- In 1982, at first reserve board in the 25th Chess Olympiad in Lucerne (+2, =4, -5),
- In 1984, at second reserve board in the 26th Chess Olympiad in Thessaloniki (+5, =5, -0) and won individual gold medal,
- In 1988, at first reserve board in the 28th Chess Olympiad in Thessaloniki (+6, =4, -1),
- In 1990, at third board in the 29th Chess Olympiad in Novi Sad (+3, =4, -3),
- In 1992, at first board in the 30th Chess Olympiad in Manila (+1, =7, -2),
- In 1994, at third board in the 31st Chess Olympiad in Moscow (+5, =2, -4),
- In 1996, at third board in the 32nd Chess Olympiad in Yerevan (+2, =5, -3),
- In 1998, at fourth board in the 33rd Chess Olympiad in Elista (+3, =3, -2).

Marios Schinis played for Cyprus in the European Team Chess Championships:

- In 1989, at fifth board in the 9th European Team Chess Championship in Haifa (+1, =3, -3).

Since 1999, Marios Schinis has rarely participated in chess tournaments. He is known as one of Cyprus' best chess arbiters. In 2011, he became FIDE Arbiter and in 2016 FIDE Instructor. Also Marios Schinis is FIDE Directory member from Cyprus.
