= Weightlifting at the 2018 Summer Youth Olympics – Girls' 53 kg =

Girls' 53 kg at the III Summer Youth Olympic Games
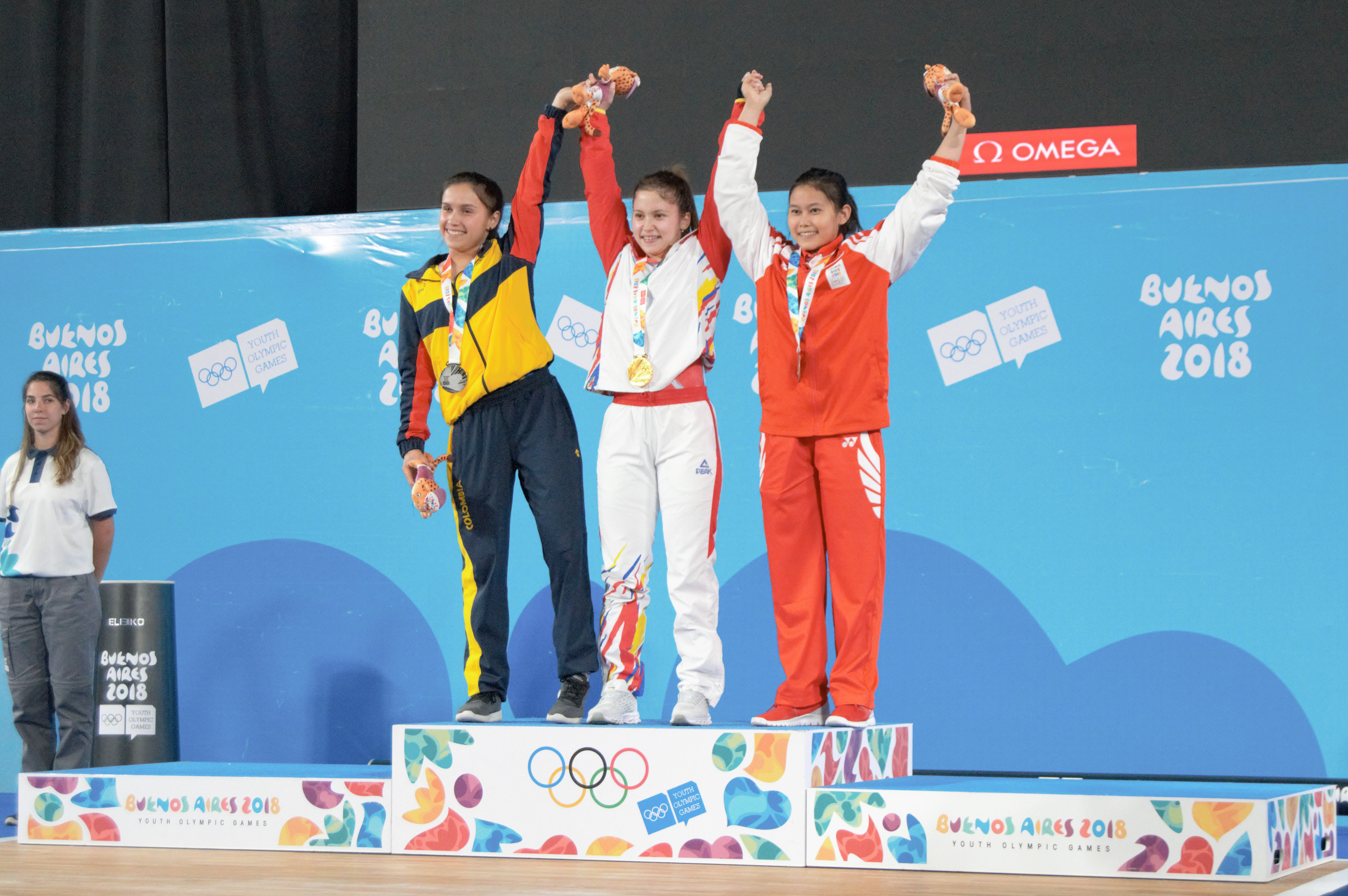
- Victory Ceremony
- Venue: Parque Polideportivo Roca
- Dates: October 9
- Competitors: 8 from 8 nations

Medalists
1st place, gold medalist(s)		Sabina Baltag	Romania
2nd place, silver medalist(s)		Kely Junkar	Colombia
3rd place, bronze medalist(s)		Nur Vinatasari	Indonesia

These are the results for the girls' 53 kg event at the 2018 Summer Youth Olympics.

== Results ==
Rank	Name	Nation	Body Weight	Snatch (kg)				Clean & Jerk (kg)				Total (kg)
Rank	Name	Nation	Body Weight	1	2	3	Res	1	2	3	Res	Total (kg)
1st place, gold medalist(s)	Sabina Baltag	Romania		72	75	77	77	96	~~100~~	100	100	177
2nd place, silver medalist(s)	Kely Junkar	Colombia		73	76	78	78	94	98	~~100~~	98	176
3rd place, bronze medalist(s)	Nur Vinatasari	Indonesia		72	~~76~~	~~77~~	72	90	~~95~~	~~95~~	90	162
4	Cintia Andrea Arva	Hungary		63	66	69	69	83	88	~~91~~	88	157
5	Gianella Valdiviezo	Peru		60	63	~~65~~	63	75	78	80	80	143
6	Ellie Pryor	Great Britain		58	61	~~63~~	61	75	78	81	81	142
7	Maddison Power	Australia		58	~~60~~	60	60	75	77	~~80~~	77	137
8	Nour El Houda Sabri	Algeria		47	~~51~~	~~53~~	47	65	70	~~76~~	70	117

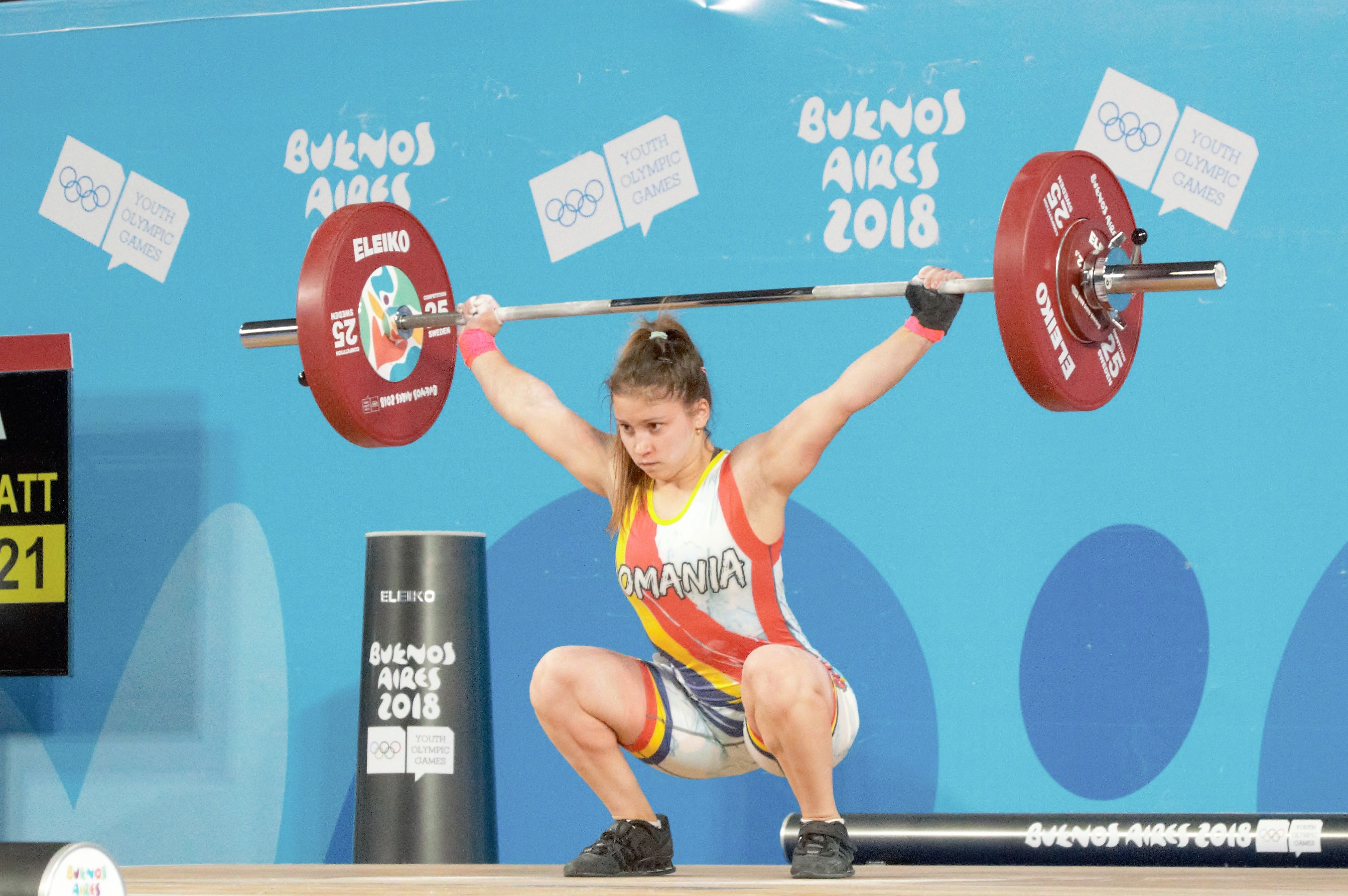
Sabina Baltag

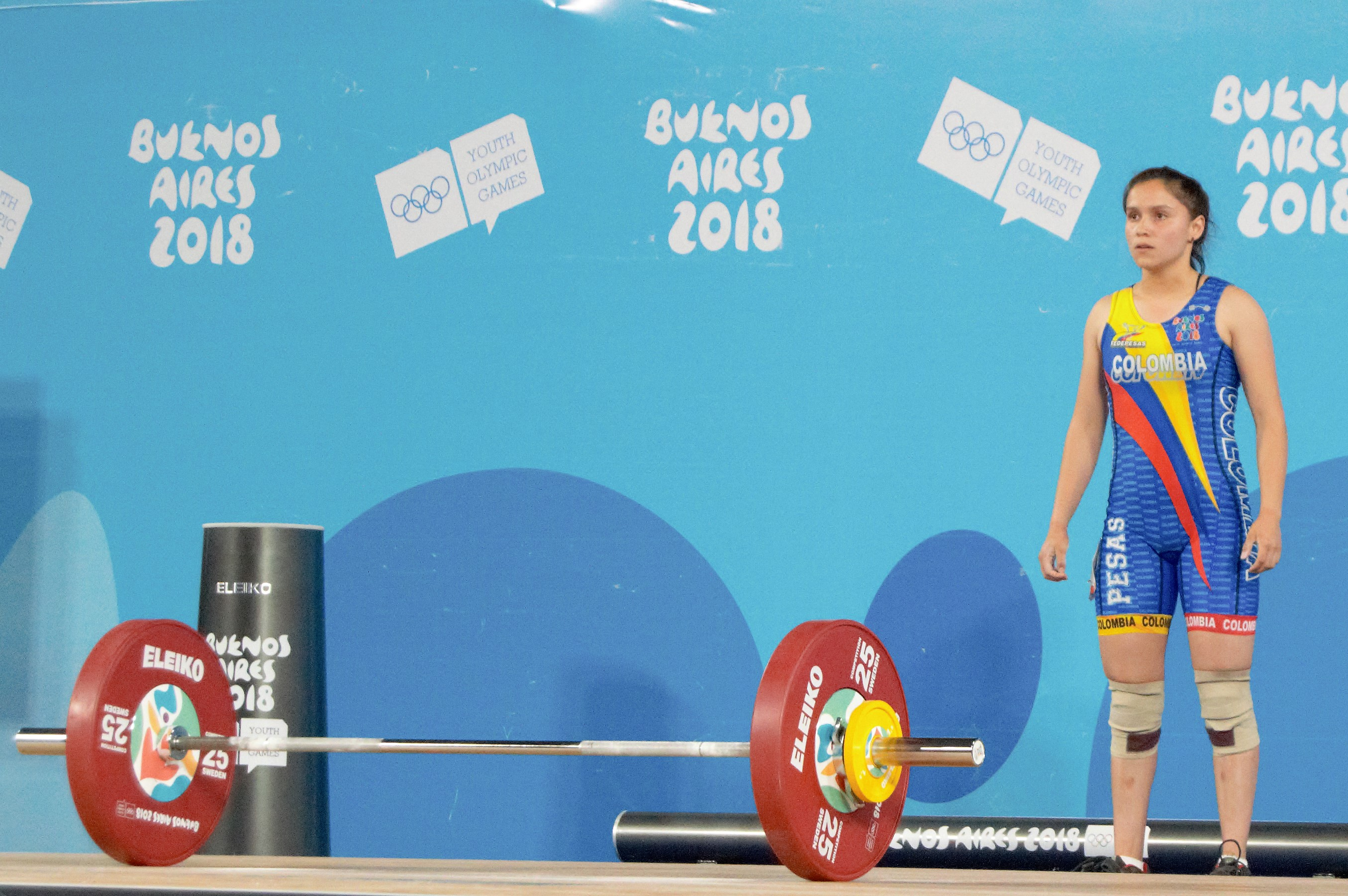
Kely Junkar

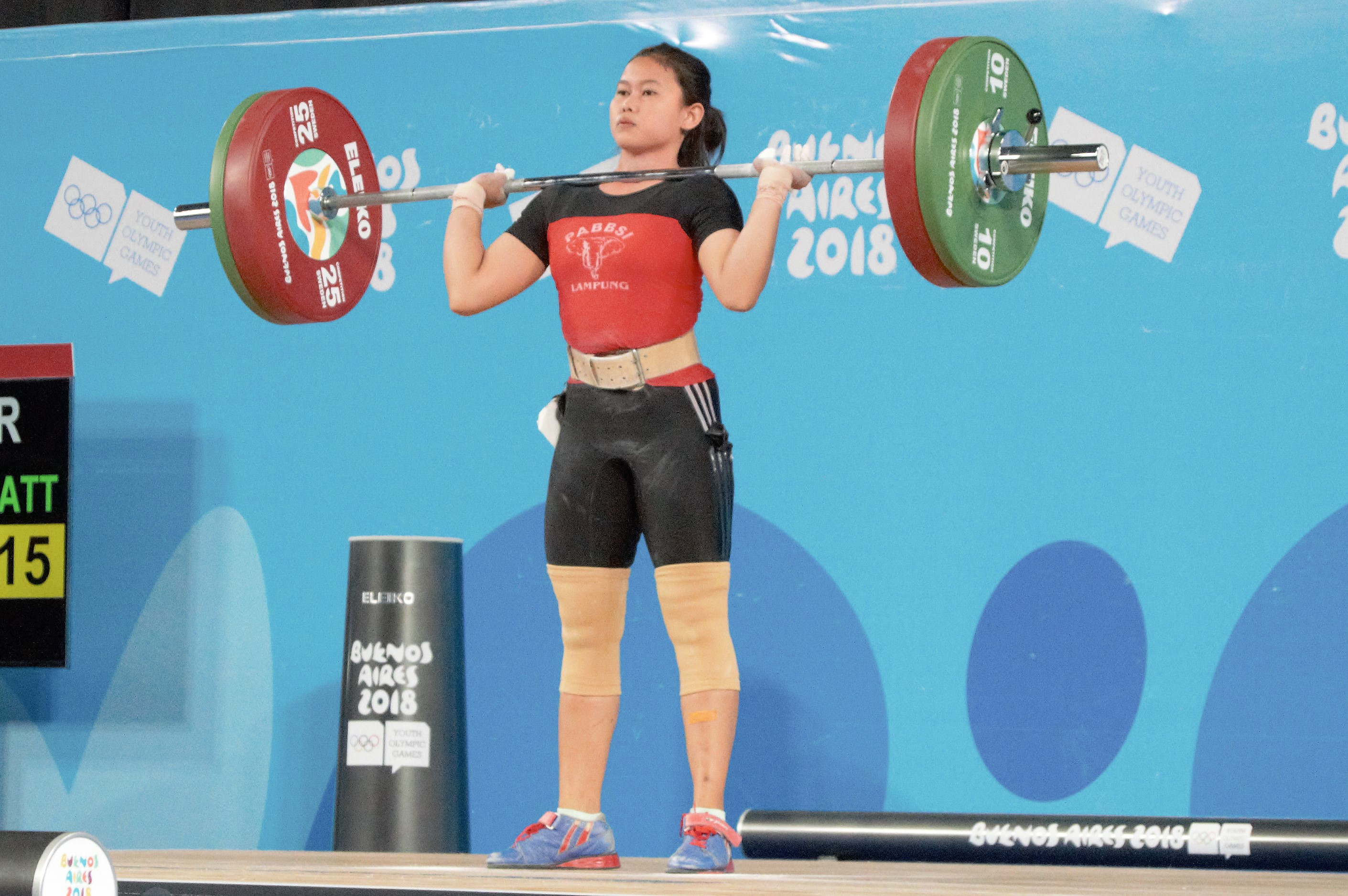
Nur Vinatasari
