= Polina Zilberman =

German chess player

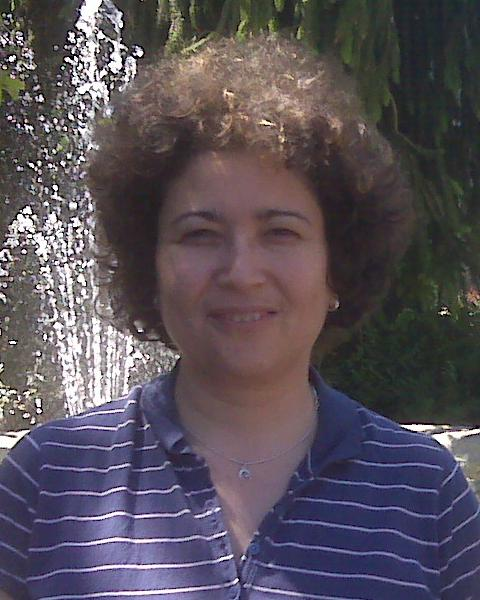
- Polina Zilberman in 2010

Personal information
- Born: 8 August 1969 (age 57) Chișinău, Moldova

Chess career
- Country: Soviet Union → Moldova (before 1997); Germany (after 1997)
- Title: Women International Master (2002)
- Peak rating: 2218 (July 1999)

Polina Zilberman (born 8 August 1969) is a Moldovan and German chess Women International Master (WIM, 2002) who twice won Moldovan Women's Chess Championship (1985, 1986) and won German Women's Chess Championship (2009).

== Chess career ==
Her father was Zinoviy Mironovich Zilberman, a member of the Union of Architects of Moldova, a native of village Coșnița. In 1990, Polina Zilberman graduated from the chess department Moscow Institute of Physical Culture and Sports. She twice in row won Moldovan Women's Chess Championship: 1985 and 1986.

Until 1997, before moving to Germany, Polina Zilberman played many tournaments in Bucharest. At the German Open Women's Chess Championship in 2002 in Bad Brueckenau she was fourth. In 2006 she became Baden Blitz and Rapid chess champion of the women in Pfalzgrafenweiler. The German Women's Chess Championship she won in 2009 in Hockenheim.

She played club chess for the FTG Frankfurt. In the 1st Chess Women's Bundesliga she played in the seasons 2005/06 and 2006/07 for the SV Walldorf. Until the 2010/11 season she played for SK Heidelberg-Handschuhsheim, where she also did youth training. From the 2012/13 season she will play for the Schachfreunde Rot 71. At SC Makkabi Heidelberg she was a passive member and trainer. German Women's Chess Team Championships of the regional chess associations she plays for the selection of the Baden Chess Association, which won the championship in 2007.

In 2002, she was awarded the FIDE Women International Master (WIM) title. Polina Zilberman was women's officer for the Badischer Schachverband and has been a certified chess trainer since 1991. Her daughter also played chess.
