= Svetlana Petrenko =

Moldovan chess player (born 1974)

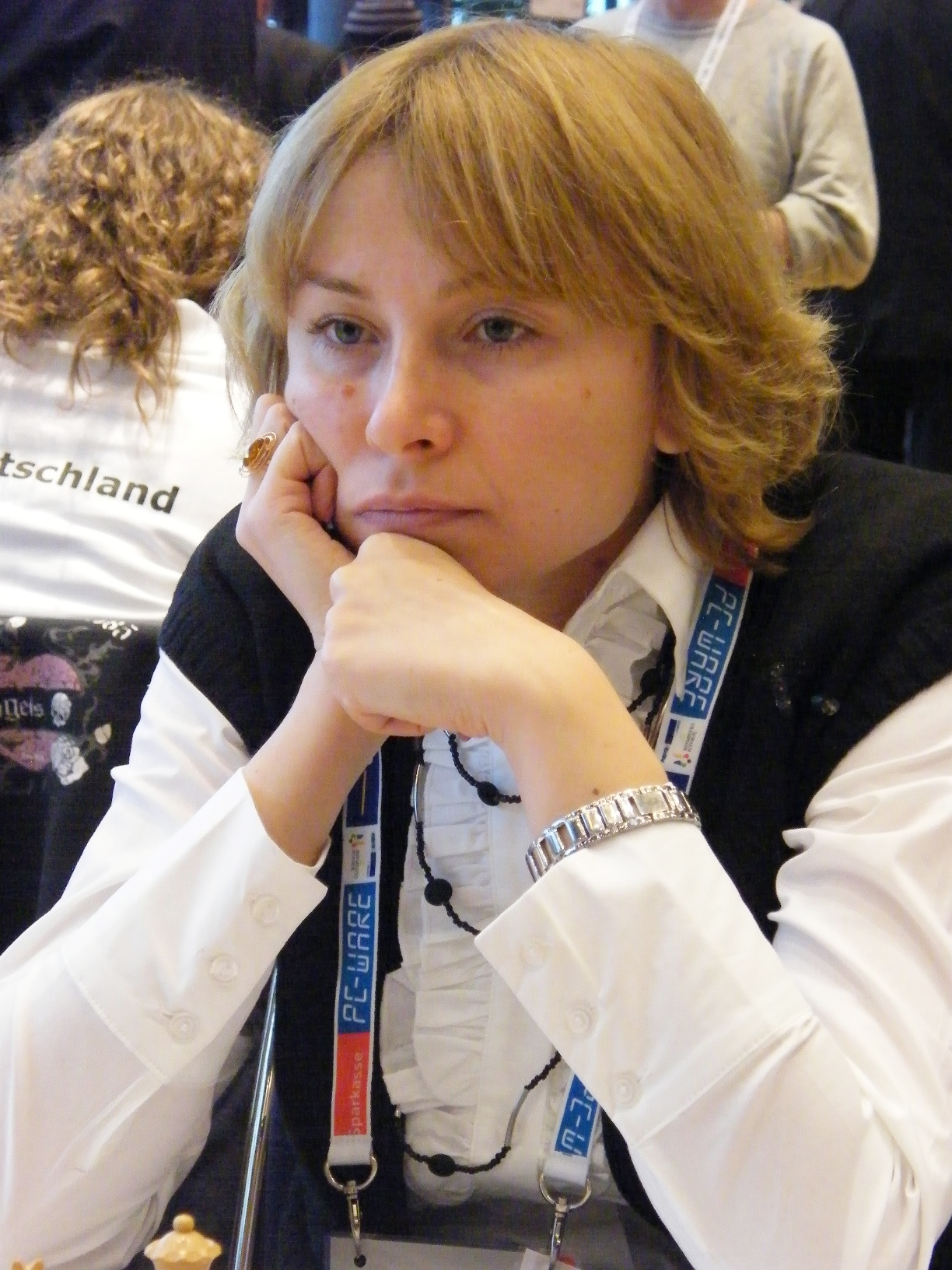
- Petrenko in 2008

Personal information
- Born: 27 May 1974 (age 52)

Chess career
- Country: Moldova
- Title: International Master (2004); Woman Grandmaster (2001)
- Peak rating: 2364 (January 2005)

Svetlana Petrenko (Romanian: Svetlana Petrenco; born 27 May 1974) is a Moldovan chess player who holds the titles of woman grandmaster (WGM, 2001) and international master (IM, 2004). She won the Moldovan Chess Championship in 2005 and is a thirteen-time Moldovan Women's Chess Champion.

== Chess career ==
Multiple Moldovan women's chess championship winner (1993, 1998, 1999, 2000, 2001, 2012, 2013, 2015, 2016, 2017, 2018, 2019, 2021). In 2005, she won the chess championship of Moldova (open to both men and women).

In 1999 Petrenko divided first place in the international women's chess tournament in Bucharest. In 2004, she won the chess tournament in Lviv. In 2005, she won the international women's chess tournament in Saint Petersburg and divided first place in the international women's chess tournament in Belgrade. In 2006 and 2007 she two times in a row won international women's chess tournament in Belgrade.

Petrenko participated in knock-out tournament Women's World Chess Championships:

- in 2001 in Moscow won Tatiana Kononenko in the 1st round but lost to next tournament winner Zhu Chen in the 2nd round;
- in 2004 in Elista lost Natalia Zhukova in the 1st round.

Petrenko played for Moldova in the Women's Chess Olympiads:

- In 1998, at first reserve board in the 33rd Chess Olympiad (women) in Elista (+4, =0, −4),
- In 2002, at first board in the 35th Chess Olympiad (women) in Bled (+6, =3, −3),
- In 2004, at first board in the 36th Chess Olympiad (women) in Calvià (+6, =6, −1),
- In 2006, at first board in the 37th Chess Olympiad (women) in Turin (+3, =4, −4),
- In 2008, at first board in the 38th Chess Olympiad (women) in Dresden (+2, =0, −8),
- In 2010, at first board in the 39th Chess Olympiad (women) in Khanty-Mansiysk (+2, =3, −3),
- In 2012, at first board in the 40th Chess Olympiad (women) in Istanbul (+4, =3, −2),
- In 2014, at second board in the 41st Chess Olympiad (women) in Tromsø (+5, =2, −2),
- In 2016, at second board in the 42nd Chess Olympiad (women) in Baku (+2, =1, −4).

Petrenko played for Moldova in the European Team Chess Championship:

- In 2001, at second board in the 4th European Team Chess Championship (women) in León (+3, =5, −1) and won team silver medal,
- In 2003, at first board in the 5th European Team Chess Championship (women) in Plovdiv (+3, =2, −4).

In 1996, she was awarded the FIDE Woman International Master (WIM) title and received the FIDE Woman Grandmaster (WGM) title five years later. In 2004, Petrenko was awarded the FIDE International Master (IM) title.
