= Marina Sheremetieva =

Moldovan chess player (born 1963)

Personal information
- Born: 7 June 1963 (age 63)

Chess career
- Country: Moldova
- Title: Woman Grandmaster (1998)
- Peak rating: 2345 (January 2000)

Marina Sheremetieva (née Afanasova; born 7 June 1963) is a Moldovan chess player who holds the FIDE title of Woman Grandmaster (WGM, 1998). She is a four-time Moldovan Women's Chess Championships winner (1978, 1987, 1988, 1992).

== Biography ==
Sheremetieva is Moldova chess trainer Vyacheslav Chebanenko's pupil. She graduated from Moldova State University. Sheremetieva four times won the Moldovan Women's Chess Championships: 1978, 1987, 1988 and 1992. In 1987, in Krasnodar, she won the USSR Trade Union Women's Chess Championship. Sheremetieva twice participated in the USSR Women's Chess Championship finals (1988, 1989), where achieved the best result in 1989 when she shared 8th-10th place. Three times Sheremetieva represented the Moldovan team at the Soviet Team Chess Championship (1983, 1985, 1991). In 1993, she won second prize in the Bucharest International Women's Chess tournament. In 1995, Marina Sheremetieva participated in the Women's World Chess Championship Interzonal Tournament in Chişinău were ranked 27th place.

Sheremetieva played for Moldova in the Women's Chess Olympiads:

- In 1992, at first board in the 30th Chess Olympiad (women) in Manila (+6, =3, -5),
- In 1994, at first reserve board in the 31st Chess Olympiad (women) in Moscow (+2, =4, -6),
- In 1996, at third board in the 32nd Chess Olympiad (women) in Yerevan (+3, =4, -3),
- In 2000, at second board in the 34th Chess Olympiad (women) in Istanbul (+5, =5, -3),
- In 2002, at second board in the 35th Chess Olympiad (women) in Bled (+3, =3, -5).

Sheremetieva played for Moldova in the European Team Chess Championship:

- In 1992, at first board in the 1st European Team Chess Championship (women) in Debrecen (+2, =5, -2).

In 1990, she was awarded the FIDE Woman International Master (WIM) title and received the FIDE Woman Grandmaster (WGM) title eight year later.
