= Vladimir Alterman =

Israeli chess player (born 1942)

Personal information
- Native name: Владимир Альтерман
- Born: 27 March 1942 (age 84) Sevastopol, Soviet Union

Chess career
- Country: Israel (after 1985); Soviet Union (before 1985)
- Title: International Master (1994)
- Peak rating: 2415 (January 1994)

Vladimir Isaakovich Alterman (Russian: Владимир Исаакович Альтерман, Hebrew: ולדימיר אלתרמן; born March 27, 1942) is an Israeli chess player who won the Moldovan Chess Championship in 1979 (and took a second place in 1978). FIDE International Master (1994).

Originally from Moldova, in the 1960-1970s he lived in Sevastopol, Ukrainian SSR, and worked as a chess coach (he was a trainer of Lea Nudelman, among others); he then moved to Chișinău and in 1985 immigrated to Israel. He plays for the Netanya Chess Club.

While in the USSR, he became Odessa champion in 1964, participated in two Soviet Army Chess Championships (1965, 1967), and USSR Chess Championship (1967). He was third in the Spartak Society Championship in 1972, and played in the finals of the Third and Seventh Spartakiads of Peoples of the USSR (1963, 1979) for Moldovan chess team.

After immigration to Israel, he participated in four Israeli Chess Championships (1986, 1990, 1999, 2003), was a winner of the Kőbánya Open Tournament (1988), and played in the 9th European Seniors Chess Championship (Dresden, 2007).

== Literature ==
Игорь Бердичевский. Шахматная еврейская энциклопедия. Russian Chess House, 2016; p. 18.
