= Baciu (surname) =

Baciu is a Romanian surname, a cognate of Slavic "Bača". Notable people with the surname include:

- Camil Baciu (1926–2005), Romanian journalist and science fiction writer
- Catalin Baciu (born 1988), Romanian basketball player
- Diana Baciu (born 1994), Moldovan chess champion
- Eugen Baciu (born 1980), Romanian football player
- Ioana Baciu (born 1990), Romanian female volleyball player
- Ion Baciu (born 1944), Romanian wrestler
- Maria Baciu (born 1942), Romanian poet
- Marius Baciu (born 1975), Romanian footballer
- Ștefan Baciu (1918–1993), Romanian poet
