= Cypriot Chess Championship =

The Cypriot Chess Championship is organized by the Cyprus Chess Federation (Greek: Κυπριακή Σκακιστική Ομοσπονδία), which joined FIDE in 1961.

== List of winners ==
Year	Champion Open	Champion Women
1961	Georgios Kleopas	
1962	Georgios Kleopas	
1963	Byron Zappas	
1965	Byron Zappas	
1966	Georgios Kleopas	
1967	Andreas Lantsias	
1968	Andreas Hadjikypris	
1969	Agathoclis Constantinou	
1970	Petros Avgousti	
1971	Petros Avgousti	
1973	N. Avraamidis	
1974	Conrad Riza	
1976	Avgousti Avgoustinos	
1977	Agathoclis Constantinou	
1980	Agathoclis Constantinou	
1981	Agathoclis Constantinou	
1982	Agathoclis Constantinou	
1983	Constantinos Hadjiyiannis	
1984	Agathoclis Constantinou	
1985	Andreas Savva	
1986	Marios Schinis	
1987	Agathoclis Constantinou	
1988	Herodotos Ipsarides	
1989	Agathoclis Constantinou	
1990	Marios Schinis	
1991	Agathoclis Constantinou	
1992	Marios Schinis	
1993	Matthaios Christodoulou	
1994	Antonis Georghiou	
1995	Panikos Savva	
1996	Paris Klerides	
1997	Paris Klerides	
1998	Herodotos Ipsarides	
1999	Antonis Antoniou	
2000	Yuri Poluektov	
2001	Paris Klerides	
2002	Paris Klerides	
2003	Antonis Antoniou	
2004	Paris Klerides	
2005	Antonis Antoniou	
2006	Iulian Baltag	
2007	Iulian Baltag	
2008	Vassilis Aristotelous	
2009	Alkis Martidis	
2010	Antonis Antoniou	
2011	Antonis Antoniou	
2012	Antonis Antoniou	
2013	Andreas Kelires	
2014	Andreas Kelires	
2015	Paris Klerides	
2016	Konstantinos Michaelides	
2017	Konstantinos Michaelides	
2018	Konstantinos Michaelides	
2019	Ioannis Damianou	
2020	Pavlos Constantinou	
2021	Konstantinos Michaelides	
2022	Konstantinos Michaelides	Christianna Markidou
2023	Konstantinos Michaelides	Victoria Sokolova
2024	Konstantinos Michaelides	Christianna Markidou
2025	Alexandros Isaakidis	Eleni Pica
2026	Rafail Antoniou	Aida Paunescu
