= Paris Klerides =

Cypriot chess player (born 1970)

Personal information
- Born: March 18, 1970 (age 56) Larnaca, Cyprus

Chess career
- Country: Cyprus
- Title: FIDE Master (2006)
- Peak rating: 2290 (January 1997)

Paris Klerides is a Cypriot chess player.

== Chess career ==
He won the Cypriot Chess Championship six times: in 1996, 1997, 2001, 2002, 2004, and 2015.

He played for Cyprus in every Chess Olympiad from the 32nd to the 39th.

He has served as the FIDE Social Action Commission councillor and the president for FIDE Zone 1.10.

In April 2018, he won the European Small Nations Blitz Chess Championship.

He was the Chief Arbiter of the World Rapid Chess Championship 2022 and the World Blitz Chess Championship 2022.
