= Andreas Kelires =

Cypriot chess grandmaster (born 1999)

Personal information
- Born: 1 July 1999 (age 27) Nicosia, Cyprus

Chess career
- Country: Cyprus (until 2016; since 2026); Greece (2016–2026)
- Title: Grandmaster (2016)
- FIDE rating: 2533 (July 2026)
- Peak rating: 2543 (December 2021)

Andreas Kelires (Greek: Αντρέας Κελίρης; born 1 July 1999) is a Cypriot chess grandmaster. He is a two-time Cypriot Chess Champion.

== Chess career ==
Born in 1999, Kelires won the Cypriot Chess Championship in 2013 and 2014. He earned his international master title in 2015 and his grandmaster title in 2016. He transferred to Greece in 2016. He is the No. 8 ranked Greek player as of February 2018. In March 2018, he competed in the European Individual Chess Championship, where he placed one-hundred-and-thirty-seventh, scoring 5½/11 (+5–5=1).
