= Moldovan Chess Championship =

The Moldovan Chess Championship has been contested every year since 1944. Since 1949 a separate women's championship has also been held in most years. Both championships are currently held under the auspices of the Moldova Chess Federation (Romanian: Federația de Șah a Republicii Moldova), which was founded on 2 November 1994.

== Open championship winners ==
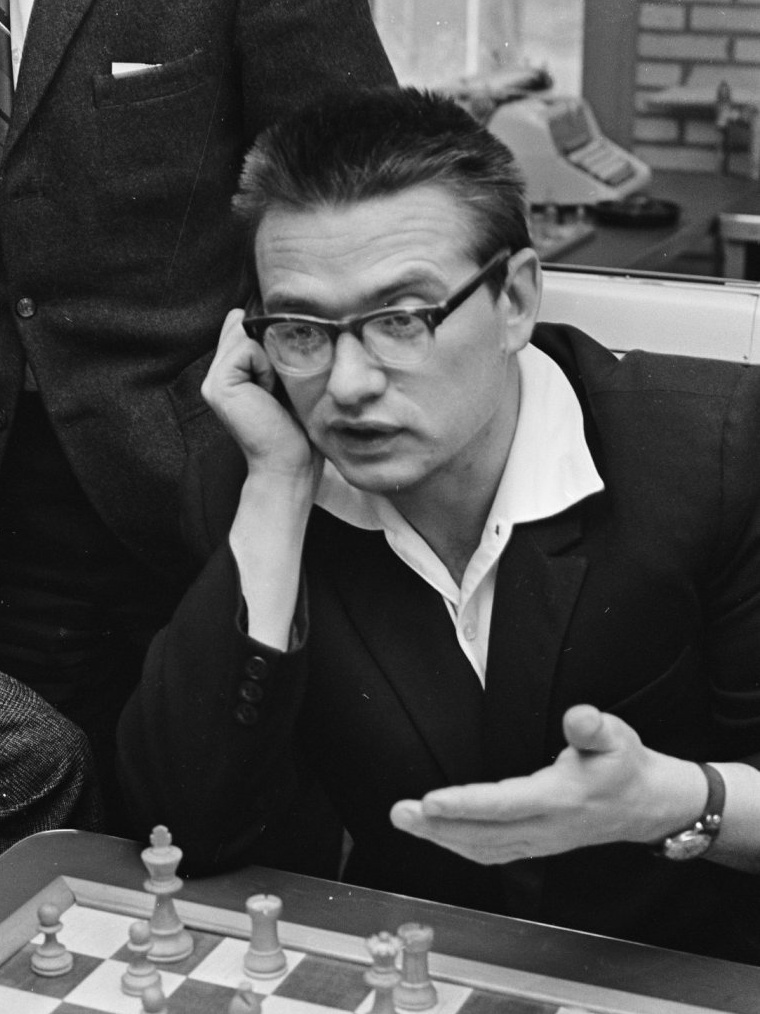
Anatoly Lutikov, six-time Moldovan champion from 1963 to 1977

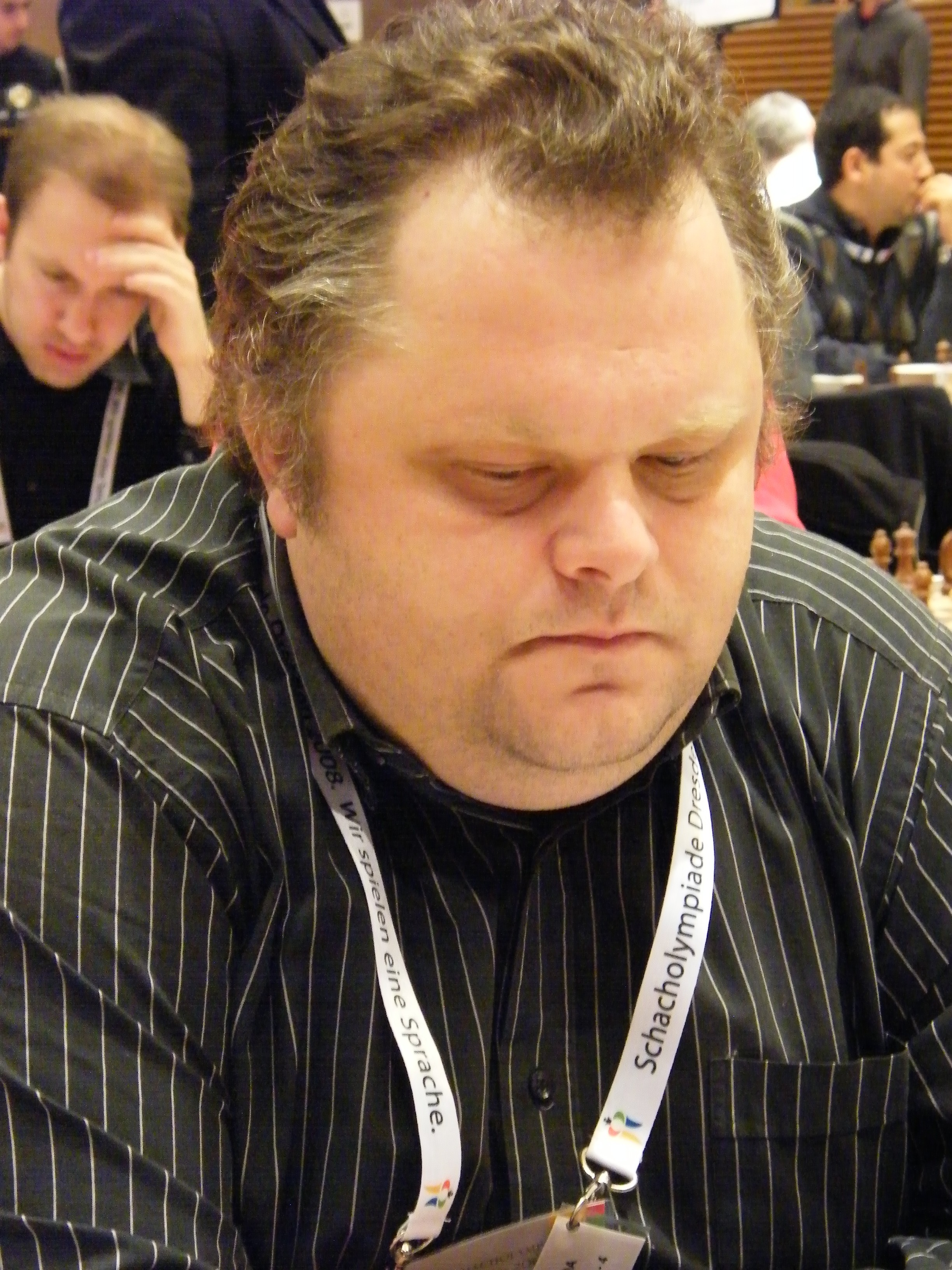
Vasile Sanduleac, five-time Moldovan champion from 1998 to 2008

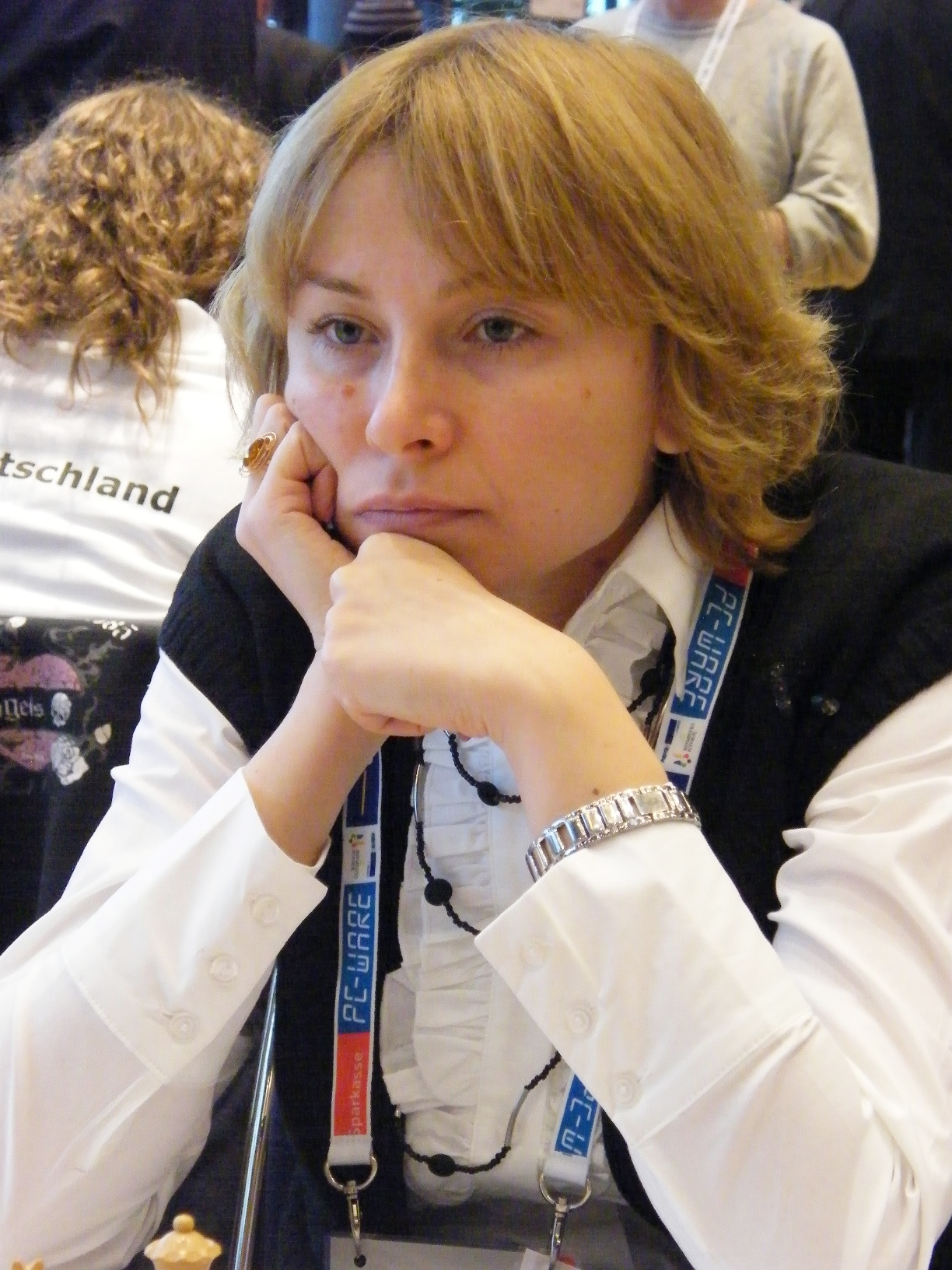
Svetlana Petrenko, Moldovan champion in 2005 and eleven-time Moldovan women's champion

Year	Champion
1944	Vasily Veter
1945	V. Uveatkin
1946	V. Uveatkin
1947	Vitaly Tarasov
1948	Vitaly Tarasov
1949	Vitaly Tarasov
1950	Vitaly Tarasov
1951	Vitaly Tarasov
1952	Mikhail Shofman
1953	M. Regenbogen
1954	Shlomo Giterman
1955	Vitaly Tarasov
1956	Shlomo Giterman
1957	Shlomo Giterman
1958	Samuel Zhukhovitsky
1959	Samuel Zhukhovitsky
1960	Shlomo Giterman
1961	Ilya Mosionzhik
1962	Mikhail Shofman
1963	Anatoly Lutikov
1964	Anatoly Lutikov
1965	Anatoly Lutikov
1966	Anatoly Lutikov
1967	Boris Nevednichy
1968	Anatoly Lutikov
1969	Mikhail Shofman
1970	Ilye Figler, Lazar Shusterman
1971	Boris Nevednichy
1972	Nikolay Popov
1973	Boris Nevednichy
1974	Nikolay Popov
1975	Nikolay Popov
1976	Nikolay Popov
1977	Anatoly Lutikov
1978	Orest Averkin
1979	Vladimir Alterman
1980	Boris Itkis
1981	Wladimir Skulener
1982	Boris Itkis
1983	Boris Itkis
1984	Boris Itkis
1985	Boris Nevednichy
1986	Georgi Orlov
1987	Boris Nevednichy
1988	German Titov
1989	Georgi Orlov
1990	Boris Itkis
1991	Ilye Figler
1992	Boris Itkis
1993	Boris Nevednichy
1994	Dorian Rogozenko
1995	Boris Nevednichy
1996	Vadim Chernov
1997	Boris Itkis
1998	Vasile Sanduleac
1999	Anatolij Bets
2000	Dmitry Svetushkin
2001	Vasile Sanduleac
2002	Alexei Furtuna
2003	Vasile Sanduleac
2004	Alexey Khruschiov
2005	Svetlana Petrenko
2006	Viacheslav Slovineanu
2007	Vasile Sanduleac
2008	Vasile Sanduleac
2009	Serghei Vedmediuc
2010	Vladimir Hamițevici
2011	Serghei Vedmediuc
2012	Iulian Baltag
2013	Dan Golub
2014	Liviu Cerbulenco
2015	Ruslan Soltanici
2016	Viorel Iordăchescu
2017	Nichita Morozov
2018	Vladimir Hamițevici
2019	Andrei Macovei
2020	Iulian Baltag
2021	Iulian Baltag
2022	Dragoș Cereș
2023	Jegor Lashkin

== Women's championship winners ==
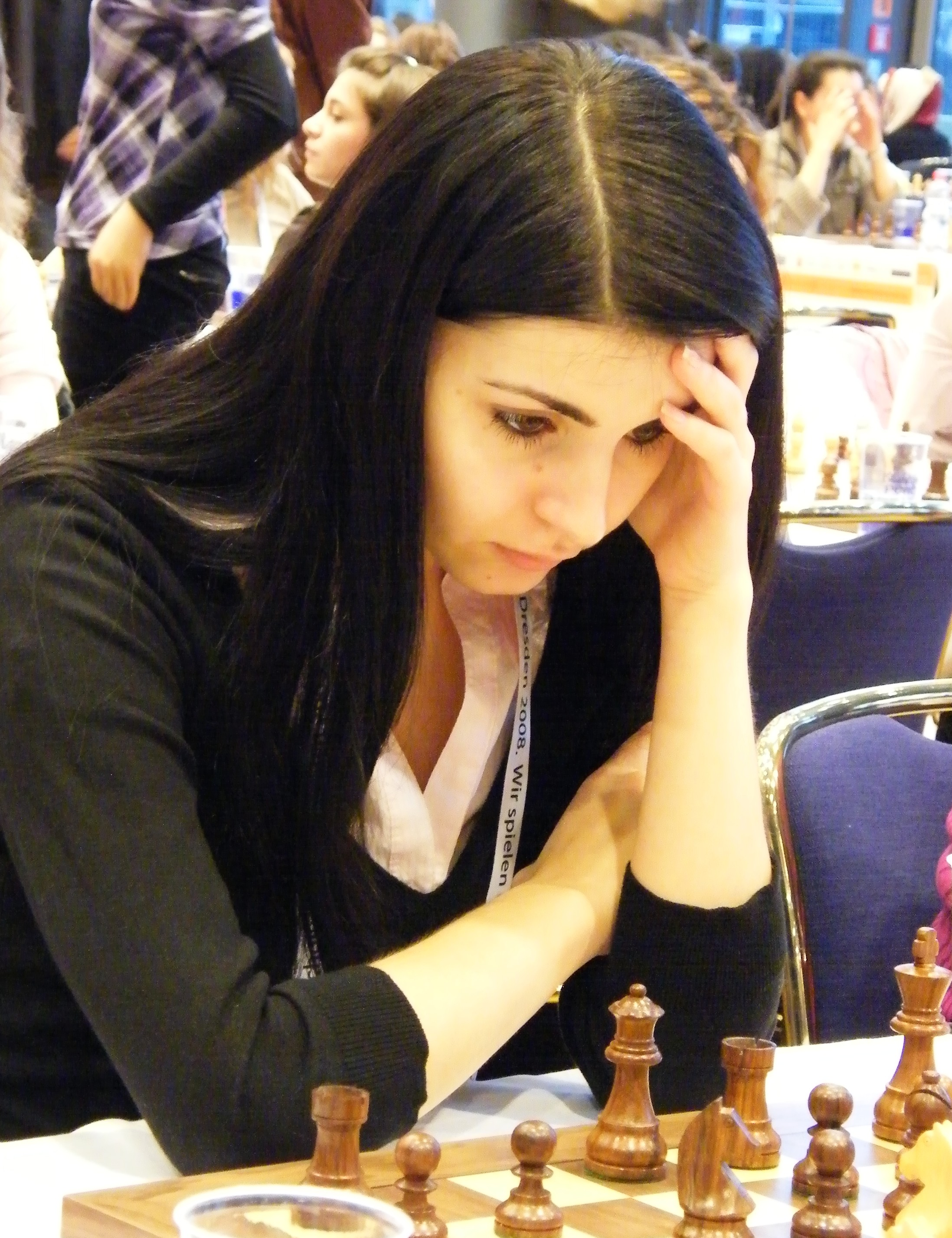
Elena Partac, four-time Moldovan women's champion from 2002 to 2010

Year	Champion
1949	Dekabrina Kazatsker
1950	N. Tarasova
1951	Natasha Kolotyi, Dekabrina Kazatsker
1952	Dekabrina Kazatsker
1953	Natasha Kolotyi
1954	E. Matos
1955	Natasha Kolotyi
1956	N. Kononova
1959	Bronislava Mosionzhik
1960	Bronislava Mosionzhik
1961	Bronislava Mosionzhik
1962	Bronislava Mosionzhik
1963	Bronislava Mosionzhik
1964	Bronislava Mosionzhik
1965	Bronislava Mosionzhik
1967	Natalia Ivanova, Bronislava Mosionzhik
1968	Bronislava Mosionzhik
1970	Bronislava Mosionzhik
1971	Raisa Nevednichaya
1972	Raisa Nevednichaya
1973	Bronislava Mosionzhik
1974	Raisa Nevednichaya
1975	Alla Grinfeld
1976	Ludmila Saunina
1977	Naira Agababean
1978	Marina Afanasova
1979	Raisa Nevednichaya
1980	Naira Agababean
1981	Naira Agababean
1982	Naira Agababean
1983	Naira Agababean
1984	Naira Agababean
1985	Polina Zilberman
1986	Polina Zilberman
1987	Marina Sheremetieva (née Afanasova)
1988	Marina Sheremetieva
1989	Irina Brandis
1990	Nadejda Roizen
1991	Irina Brandis
1992	Marina Sheremetieva
1993	Svetlana Petrenko
1994	Naira Agababean
1995	Anna Shusterman
1996	Naira Agababean
1997	Karolina Smokina
1998	Svetlana Petrenko
1999	Svetlana Petrenko
2000	Anna Shusterman, Svetlana Petrenko
2001	Svetlana Petrenko
2002	Elena Partac
2003	Elena Partac
2004	Anna Shusterman
2005	Lilia Doibani
2006	Elena Partac
2007	Irina Bulmaga
2008	Irina Bulmaga
2009	Diana Baciu
2010	Elena Partac
2011	Olga Hincu
2012	Svetlana Petrenko
2013	Svetlana Petrenko
2014	Paula-Alexandra Gitu
2015	Svetlana Petrenko
2016	Svetlana Petrenko
2017	Svetlana Petrenko
2018	Svetlana Petrenko
2019	Svetlana Petrenko
2020	Valentina Verbin
2021	Svetlana Petrenko
2022	Ana Petricenco
2023	Alina Mihailova
