= Diana Baciu =

Moldovan chess player (born 1994)

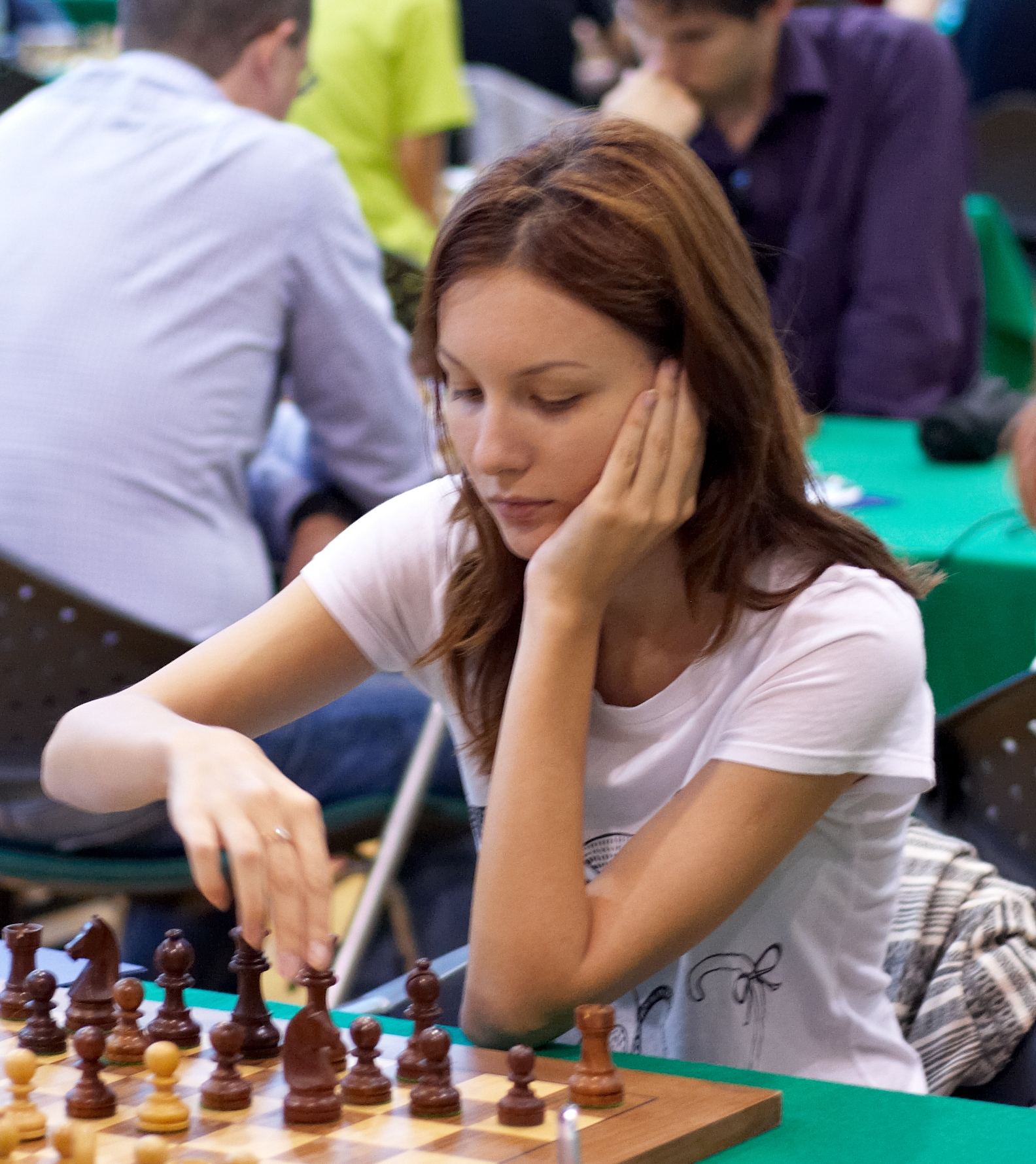
- Diana Baciu in 2012

Personal information
- Born: 26 March 1994 (age 32)

Chess career
- Country: Moldova
- Title: Woman International Master (2013)
- Peak rating: 2298 (May 2017)

Diana Baciu (born 26 March 1994) is a Moldovan chess player. She received the FIDE title of Woman International Master (WIM) in 2013. She won the Moldovan Women's Chess Championship in 2009.

== Biography ==
In the 2000s Diana Baciu repeatedly represented Moldova at the European Youth Chess Championships and World Youth Chess Championships in different age groups, where she won three medals:

- gold (in 2011, at the European Youth Chess Championship in the U18 girls age group);
- bronze (in 2006, at the World Youth Chess Championship in the U12 girls age group);
- bronze (in 2008, at the World Youth Chess Championship in the U14 girls age group).

She successfully participated in Moldovan Women's Chess Championships, where:

- in 2007 shared 2nd-3rd place,
- in 2008 won silver,
- in 2009 became champion,
- in 2010 won bronze .

Baciu played for Moldova in the Women's Chess Olympiads:

- In 2010, at fourth board in the 39th Chess Olympiad (women) in Khanty-Mansiysk (+5, =4, -1),
- In 2012, at second board in the 40th Chess Olympiad (women) in Istanbul (+5, =4, -2),
- In 2014, at first board in the 41st Chess Olympiad (women) in Tromsø (+4, =2, -4),
- In 2016, at first board in the 42nd Chess Olympiad (women) in Baku (+5, =2, -3),
- In 2018, at first board in the 43rd Chess Olympiad (women) in Batumi (+4, =3, -3).

In 2013, she was awarded the FIDE Woman International Master (WIM) title.
