= Dragoș Cereș =

Moldovan chess player (born 2004)

Personal information
- Born: July 16, 2004 (age 21)

Chess career
- Country: Moldova
- Title: International Master (2022)
- FIDE rating: 2444 (July 2026)
- Peak rating: 2484 (April 2024)

Dragoș Cereș (born 2004) is a Moldovan chess player who holds the title of International Master (IM, 2022). He won the Moldovan Chess Championship (2022).

== Biography ==
Dragoș Cereș multiple times won Moldovan Youth Chess Championships in various age groups: U10 (2014), U14 (2018) and U16 (2019). He participated in European Youth Chess Championships and World Youth Chess Championships. In 2019 Dragoș Cereș ranked in 2nd place in European School Chess Championship in U15 age group.

In 2022 Dragoș Cereș won Moldovan Chess Championship.

In August 2023, he finished third in the Riga Technical University Open "A" tournament.

Dragoș Cereș played for Moldova in the Chess Olympiad:

- In 2022, at reserve board in the 44th Chess Olympiad in Chennai (+5, =3, -1).

In 2022, he was awarded the FIDE International Master (IM) title.
