= Sabina Baltag =

Romanian weightlifter (born 2001)

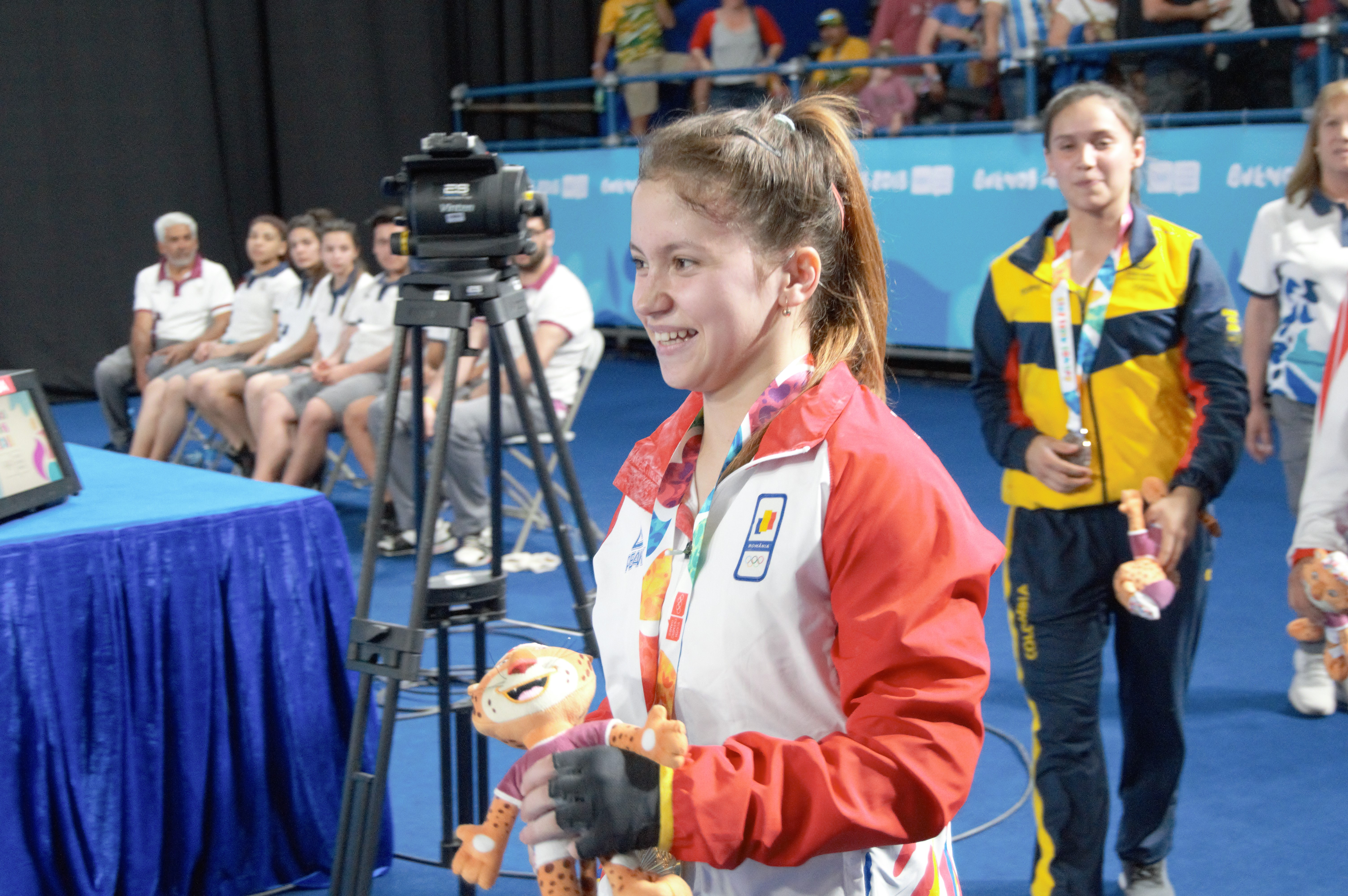
- Baltag at the 2018 Summer Youth Olympics

Personal information
- Born: 24 April 2001 (age 25)

Sport
- Country: Romania
- Sport: Weightlifting
- Weight class: 53 kg
Medal record
Women's weightlifting
Representing Romania
Summer Youth Olympics
Gold medal – first place	2018 Buenos Aires	53 kg
European Youth Weightlifting Championships
Gold medal – first place	2018 San Donato Milanese	53 kg
Bronze medal – third place	2017 Pristina	53 kg

Sabina Baltag (born 24 April 2001) is a Romanian weightlifter. She won the gold medal in the 53 kg event at the 2018 Summer Youth Olympics held in Buenos Aires, Argentina. In 2018, she also won the gold medal in the youth women's 53 kg event at the European Youth Weightlifting Championships held in San Donato Milanese, Italy.
