= Andrei Macovei =

Moldovan chess player (born 2000)

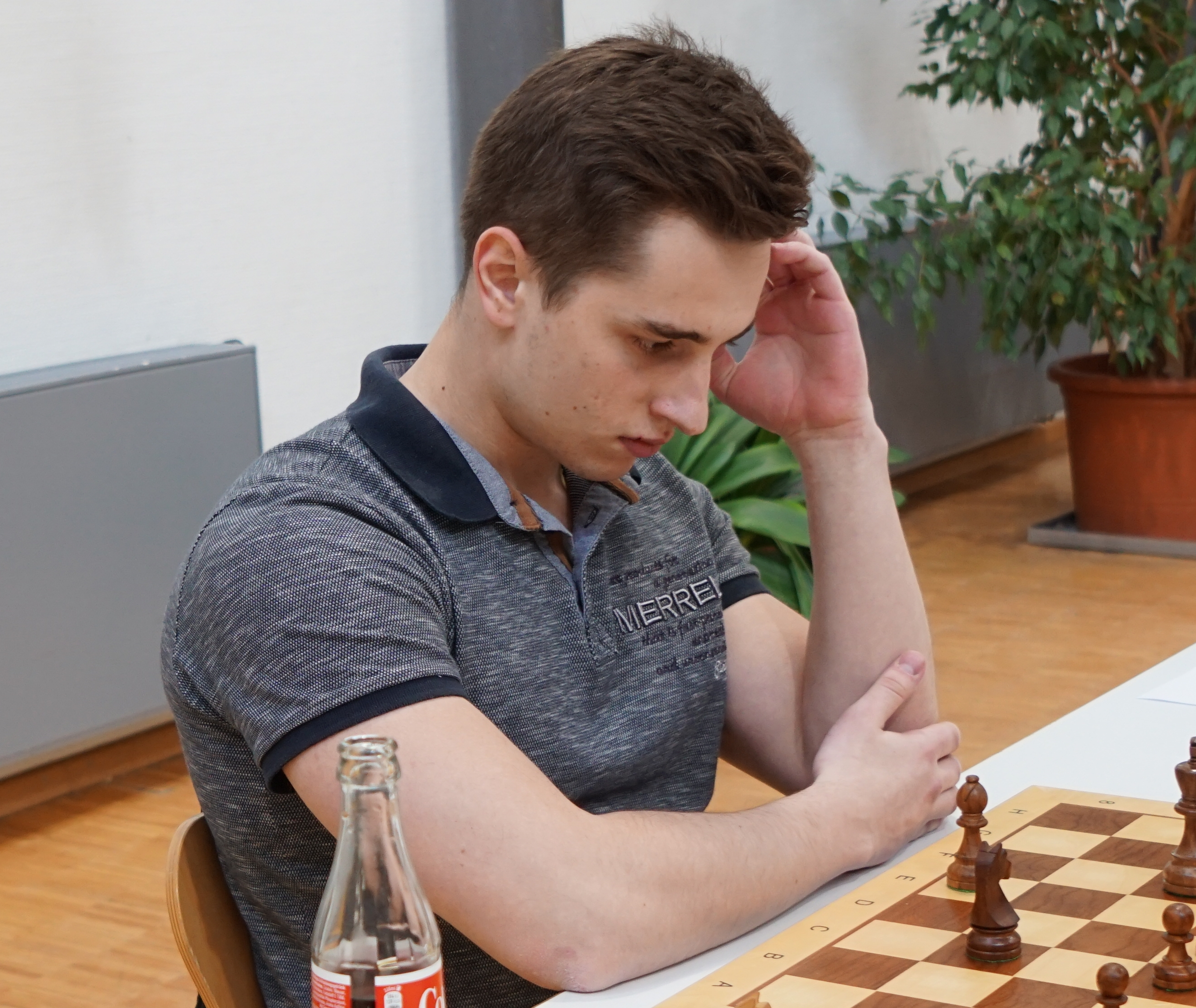

Personal information
- Born: 5 January 2000 (age 26)

Chess career
- Country: Moldova
- Title: International Master (2019)
- FIDE rating: 2484 (September 2026)
- Peak rating: 2491 (September 2022)

Andrei Macovei (born 5 January 2000) is a Moldovan chess player who holds the title of International Master (IM, 2019). He won the Moldovan Chess Championship (2019).

== Biography ==
Andrei Macovei was one of the best young Moldovan chess players. He participated in European Youth Chess Championships and World Youth Chess Championships. In 2017 Andrei Macovei won World School Chess Championship in Open U17 age group.

Andrei Macovei is a multiple participant in the Moldovan chess championships. In this tournaments he won gold (2019) and silver (2022) medals.

Andrei Macovei played for Moldova in the Chess Olympiad:

- In 2022, at second board in the 44th Chess Olympiad in Chennai (+4, =4, -2).

Andrei Macovei played for Moldova in the European Team Chess Championships:

- In 2017, at reserve board in the 21st European Team Chess Championship in Hersonissos (+2, =3, -2),
- In 2019, at second board in the 22nd European Team Chess Championship in Batumi (+2, =1, -3).

In 2019, he was awarded the FIDE International Master (IM) title.
