= Vladimir Hamițevici =

Moldovan chess grandmaster (born 1991)

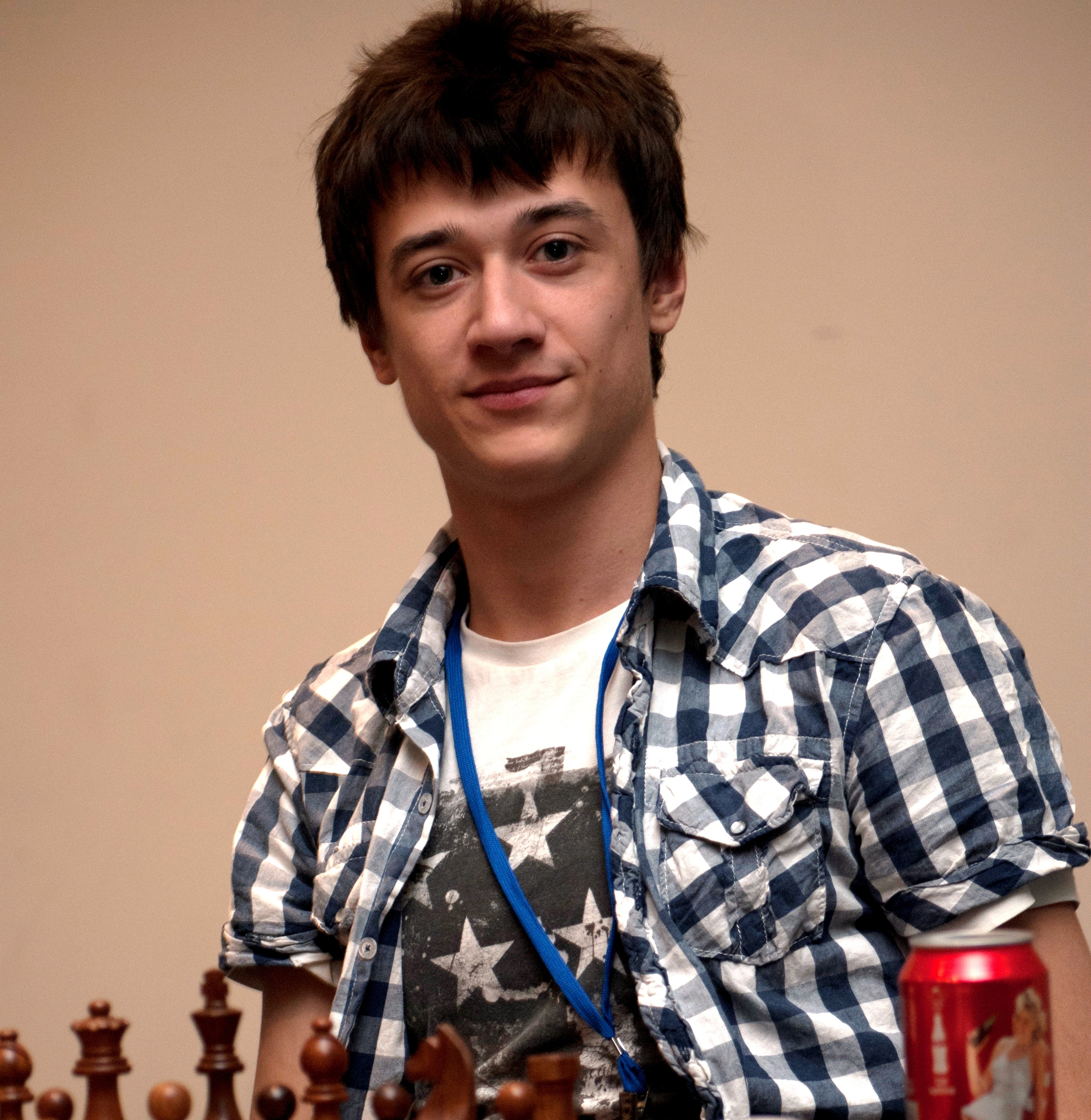
- Vladimir Hamițevici in 2011

Personal information
- Born: 19 February 1991 (age 35) Bender, Moldovan SSR, Soviet Union

Chess career
- Country: Moldova
- Title: Grandmaster (2017)
- FIDE rating: 2446 (September 2026)
- Peak rating: 2520 (June 2018)

Vladimir Hamițevici (born 19 February 1991) is a Moldovan chess player who holds the title of Grandmaster (GM, 2017). He won the Moldovan Chess Championship two times (2010, 2018).

== Biography ==
Vladimir Hamițevici is a multiple participant of the Moldovan chess championships. In this tournaments he won two gold (2010, 2018), silver (2019) and bronze (2017) medals.

In 2011 in Kyiv he won Vladimir Nabokov memorial chess tournament.

Vladimir Hamițevici played for Moldova in the Chess Olympiads:

- In 2010, at third board in the 39th Chess Olympiad in Khanty-Mansiysk (+4, =3, -3),
- In 2014, at third board in the 41st Chess Olympiad in Tromsø (+4, =1, -5),
- In 2016, at fourth board in the 42nd Chess Olympiad in Baku (+4, =1, -4),
- In 2018, at third board in the 43rd Chess Olympiad in Batumi (+1, =5, -1),
- In 2022, at third board in the 44th Chess Olympiad in Chennai (+6, =0, -2).

Vladimir Hamițevici played for Moldova in the European Team Chess Championships:

- In 2011, at reserve board in the 18th European Team Chess Championship in Porto Carras (+1, =3, -0),
- In 2015, at reserve board in the 20th European Team Chess Championship in Reykjavík (+2, =1, -2),
- In 2017, at third board in the 21st European Team Chess Championship in Hersonissos (+2, =1, -4),
- In 2019, at reserve board in the 22nd European Team Chess Championship in Batumi (+2, =5, -1).

In 2010, he was awarded the FIDE International Master (IM) title and received the FIDE Grandmaster (GM) title seven years later.
