= Iulian Baltag =

Moldovan chess player (born 1986)

Personal information
- Born: 1 July 1986 (age 40)

Chess career
- Country: Moldova
- Title: International Master (2011)
- FIDE rating: 2387
- Peak rating: 2435 (November 2022)

Iulian Baltag (born 1 July 1986) is a Moldovan chess player who holds the title of International Master (IM, 2011). He three times won Moldovan Chess Championship (2012, 2020, 2021) and twice won Cypriot Chess Championship (2006, 2007). In addition to his competitive career, Iulian Baltag has worked as a chess coach and educator. He is also in the top 10 best chess players in Moldova according to fide ratings.

== Biography ==
Iulian Baltag is a multiple participant of the Moldovan chess championships. In this tournament, he won three gold (2012, 2020, 2021) and bronze (2022) medals.

Also he twice in row won Cypriot Chess Championships: in 2006 and 2007.

Iulian Baltag played for Moldova in the Chess Olympiads:

- In 2012, at reserve board in the 40th Chess Olympiad in Istanbul (+1, =2, -1),
- In 2022, at fourth board in the 44th Chess Olympiad in Chennai (+3, =3, -1).

In 2011, he was awarded the FIDE International Master (IM) title.

== Playing style ==
Iulian Baltag is known for his positional understanding and experience in tournament play. Baltag also has a solid, practical approach and doesn't have an aggressive approach.
