= List of chess grandmasters =

The following people have all been grandmasters (GM) of chess. The title has been awarded since 1950 to players who have met the standards required by the sport's governing body, FIDE. Other than world champion, it is the highest title a chess player can attain and is awarded for life, although FIDE regulations allow for the revocation of titles for cheating or fraud. FIDE has awarded 2166 grandmaster titles, not counting four GM titles that have been revoked.

== Grandmasters ==
Player names are generally listed as they appear in FIDE records such as the FIDE Chess Profile pages, although accented letters are used where they apply, which FIDE databases simplify to the English alphabet. When player names or spellings have changed, the most recent is used even if it is different than that when the title was awarded which is then listed in the Notes column. Variants in transliteration such as "Alexei" vs. "Alexey" are not mentioned.

FIDE has issued ID codes since 1998; some older grandmasters were never assigned an ID. For living grandmasters, this field is a weblink to the FIDE Chess Profile page which usually gives the year the GM title was awarded and the player's birth year. FIDE IDs for deceased grandmasters are retained in this table to aid matching with older FIDE records such as the FIDE rating lists.

Title Year is the year FIDE officially awarded the title. Sometimes this may be a year after the player completed the final norm requirements for the title. In a few cases (e.g. Esteban Canal), the title was awarded retrospectively, many years after the relevant achievements.

The player's federation is stated at the time the GM title was awarded. If the player later changed federations, this is listed in Notes.

The Notes column gives the entire row's sources and those from 1950 to 2016 are equally in Chess International Titleholders, 1950–2016 by Di Felice.

| Name | FIDE ID | Born | Birthplace | Died | Title Year | Federation | Sex | Notes |
|---|---|---|---|---|---|---|---|---|
| Aagaard, Jacob | 1401815 | 1973-07-31 | Hørsholm | | 2007 | Denmark | M | title application; later Scotland, currently Denmark |
| Abasov, Nijat | 13402960 | 1995-05-14 | Baku | | 2011 | Azerbaijan | M | title application |
| Abbasifar, Hasan | 12501000 | 1972-09-12 | Shiraz | | 2013 | Iran | M | title application (Note: References have three different dates of birth for Abbasifar, the one shown (12 Sep 1972) is from his GM title application. Di Felice lists 11 Aug 1972; his IM title application gives 11 Sep 1982.); currently Spain |
| Abbasov, Farid | 13400665 | 1979-01-31 | Baku | | 2007 | Azerbaijan | M | title application |
| Abdisalimov, Abdimalik | 14206323 | 2002-03-03 | | | 2023 | Uzbekistan | M | title application |
| Abdumalik, Zhansaya | 13703544 | 2000-01-12 | Almaty | | 2021 | Kazakhstan | F | title application |
| Abdusattorov, Nodirbek | 14204118 | 2004-09-18 | Tashkent | | 2018 | Uzbekistan | M | title application (Note: Abdusattorov's date of birth is from ChessBase News: Friedel, Frederic (29 October 2017), Abdusattorov second youngest GM ever, ChessBase. His birthplace is from Barden, Leonard (6 January 2017), "Ramesh Praggnanandhaa and Nodirbek Abdusattorov race to break world record", The Guardian.) |
| Abergel, Thal | 614890 | 1982-10-13 | Haifa | | 2008 | France | M | title application |
| Abramović, Boško | 900206 | 1951-02-14 | Zrenjanin | 2021-12-19 | 1984 | Yugoslavia | M | later Serbia |
| Abreu Delgado, Aryam | 3502589 | 1978-07-09 | Güines | | 2008 | Cuba | M | title application |
| Ács, Péter | 708020 | 1981-05-10 | Eger | | 1998 | Hungary | M | |
| Aczél, Gergely | 727709 | 1991-02-27 | Budapest | | 2018 | Hungary | M | title application |
| Adams, Michael | 400041 | 1971-11-17 | Truro | | 1989 | England | M | |
| Adhiban B. | 5018471 | 1992-08-15 | Chennai | | 2010 | India | M | title application |
| Ahmad, Al Khatib | 8103178 | 1995-04-28 | Madaba | | 2023 | Jordan | M | winner 2023 Arab Chess Championship |
| Adly, Ahmed | 10601619 | 1987-02-19 | Cairo | | 2005 | Egypt | M | title application |
| Adorján, András | 700096 | 1950-03-31 | Budapest | 2023-05-11 | 1973 | Hungary | M | |
| Afanasiev, Nikita | 24183555 | 2000-08-29 | | | 2020 | Russia | M | title application |
| Agaragimov, Djakhangir | 13401718 | 1986-12-05 | | | 2014 | Azerbaijan | M | title application |
| Agdestein, Simen | 1500015 | 1967-05-15 | Asker | | 1985 | Norway | M | |
| Aghamaliyev, Cemil | 13400215 | 1974-08-31 | | | 2002 | Azerbaijan | M | formerly Gamil Agamaliev; currently Turkey |
| Aghasaryan, Robert | 13302841 | 1994-03-01 | Saint Petersburg | | 2014 | Armenia | M | title application |
| Agmanov, Zhandos | 13708309 | 2000-01-25 | Shymkent | | 2026 | Kazakhstan | M | GM title application; IM title application |
| Agrest, Evgenij | 1705024 | 1966-08-15 | Vitebsk | | 1997 | Russia | M | currently Sweden |
| Agüero Jiménez, Luis Lázaro | 3508455 | 1991-01-05 | Havana | | 2019 | Cuba | M | title application |
| Agzamov, Georgy | | 1954-09-06 | Almalyk | 1986-08-27 | 1984 | Soviet Union | M | |
| Ahmadzada, Ahmad | 13413007 | 2004-12-13 | Baku | | 2023 | Azerbaijan | M | title application; IM title application |
| Ajrapetjan, Yuriy | 14109069 | 1988-04-18 | Yerevan | | 2007 | Ukraine | M | title application; currently Russia |
| Akash, G. | 5040299 | 1996-10-01 | Chennai | | 2020 | India | M | title application |
| Akbaev, Kazbek | 4131045 | 1981-06-08 | Cherkessk | | 2015 | Russia | M | title application |
| Åkesson, Ralf | 1700120 | 1961-02-08 | Oxelösund | | 1995 | Sweden | M | |
| Akobian, Varuzhan | 13300580 | 1983-11-19 | Yerevan | | 2004 | Armenia | M | currently United States |
| Akopian, Vladimir | 13300032 | 1971-12-07 | Baku | | 1991 | Armenia | M | currently United States |
| Al-Sayed, Mohamad | 12100196 | 1981-11-02 | | | 2009 | Qatar | M | title application |
| Al-Mudahka, Mohd | 12100030 | 1974-06-01 | | | 1998 | Qatar | M | |
| Alatortsev, Vladimir | | 1909-05-14 | Turki | 1987-01-13 | 1983 | Soviet Union | M | honorary |
| Alavkin, Arseny | 4120612 | 1969-01-17 | Kazan | | 2010 | Russia | M | title application |
| Albornoz Cabrera, Carlos Daniel | 3518736 | 2000-12-26 | Camagüey | | 2019 | Cuba | M | title application |
| Alburt, Lev | 2000156 | 1945-08-21 | Orenburg | | 1977 | Soviet Union | M | currently United States |
| Aleksandrov, Aleksej | 13500139 | 1973-05-11 | Kobryn | | 1997 | Belarus | M | |
| Alekseenko, Kirill | 4135539 | 1997-06-22 | Saint Petersburg | | 2015 | Russia | M | title application; currently Austria |
| Alekseev, Evgeny | 4138147 | 1985-11-28 | Pushkin, Saint Petersburg | | 2002 | Russia | M | currently Israel |
| Alexakis, Dimitris | 4277023 | 2003 | | | 2025 | Greece | M | GM title application |
| Ali Marandi, Cemil Can | 6300529 | 1998-01-17 | İzmir | | 2017 | Turkey | M | title application |
| Almási, Zoltán | 702293 | 1976-08-29 | Járdánháza | | 1993 | Hungary | M | |
| Almeida Quintana, Omar | 3503313 | 1981-10-28 | Havana | | 2006 | Cuba | M | |
| Alonso Rosell, Alvar | 2270544 | 1992-09-13 | Figueres | | 2013 | Spain | M | title application |
| Alonso, Salvador | 105198 | 1974-09-07 | Buenos Aires | | 2009 | Argentina | M | title application |
| Alsina Leal, Daniel | 2252627 | 1988-05-10 | Barcelona | | 2010 | Spain | M | title application |
| Alterman, Boris | 2801906 | 1970-05-04 | Kharkiv | | 1992 | Ukraine | M | currently Israel |
| Alvarez Pedraza, Aramis | 3507408 | 1988-07-27 | Santa Clara, Cuba | | 2010 | Cuba | M | title application |
| Amanov, Mesgen | 14000652 | 1986-09-06 | Daşoguz | | 2009 | Turkmenistan | M | title application |
| Amar, Elham | 1533533 | 2005-01-02 | | | 2024 | Norway | M | title application |
| Amin, Bassem | 10601457 | 1988-09-09 | Tanta | | 2006 | Egypt | M | |
| Amonatov, Farrukh | 14700077 | 1978-04-13 | Dushanbe | | 2002 | Tajikistan | M | |
| Anagnostopoulos, Dimitris | 4204077 | 1970-06-11 | | | 1996 | Greece | M | sometimes Dmitri or Demetrios Agnos |
| Anand, Pranav | 46626786 | 2006-11-03 | Tiruchirappalli | | 2022 | India | M | title application |
| Anand, Viswanathan | 5000017 | 1969-12-11 | Chennai | | 1988 | India | M | |
| Anastasian, Ashot | 13300059 | 1964-07-16 | Yerevan | 2016-12-26 | 1993 | Armenia | M | |
| Andersen, Mads | 1413864 | 1995-03-01 | Nuuk | | 2016 | Denmark | M | title application |
| Andersson, Ulf | 1700014 | 1951-06-27 | Västerås | | 1972 | Sweden | M | |
| Andreev, Eduard | 14103400 | 1980-03-12 | Sloviansk | | 2005 | Ukraine | M | title application |
| Andreikin, Dmitry | 4158814 | 1990-02-05 | Ryazan | | 2007 | Russia | M | title application |
| Andriasian, Zaven | 13302000 | 1989-03-11 | Yerevan | | 2006 | Armenia | M | IM title application |
| Anić, Darko | 602612 | 1957-04-30 | Zadar | | 1999 | France | M | FIDE Golden Book; Di Felice (Note: Di Felice gives 2001 as Anić's GM title year, but the FIDE Golden Book and the FIDE Chess Profile show the title award was in 1999.) |
| Anisimov, Pavel | 4135229 | 1986-04-19 | Leningrad | | 2019 | Russia | M | title application; currently Montenegro |
| Anka, Emil | 700754 | 1969-01-20 | Békéscsaba | | 2001 | Hungary | M | |
| Annaberdiyev, Meylis | 14000563 | 1985-12-24 | Büzmeýin | | 2022 | Turkmenistan | M | title application; Di Felice |
| Annageldyev, Orazly | 14000016 | 1960-03-20 | Büzmeýin | | 2005 | Turkmenistan | M | title application |
| Annakov, Babakuli | 14000032 | 1972-05-29 | | | 1998 | Turkmenistan | M | currently United States |
| Ansat, Aldiyar | 13715658 | 2008-07-15 | | | 2026 | Kazakhstan | M | GM title application |
| Antal, Gergely | 717312 | 1985-03-20 | Budapest | | 2011 | Hungary | M | title application |
| Antić, Dejan | 901008 | 1968-12-09 | Belgrade | | 1999 | Yugoslavia (S&M) | M | currently Serbia |
| Antipov, Mikhail Al. | 4107012 | 1997-06-10 | Moscow | | 2013 | Russia | M | title application; currently United States |
| Antón Guijarro, David | 2285525 | 1995-06-23 | Murcia | | 2013 | Spain | M | title application |
| Antoniewski, Rafał | 1111078 | 1980-12-03 | Bielsko-Biała | | 2010 | Poland | M | title application |
| Antonio, Rogelio Jr. | 5200032 | 1962-02-19 | | | 1993 | Philippines | M | |
| Antoshin, Vladimir | | 1929-05-14 | Moscow | 1994-05-13 | 1964 | Russia | M | |
| Antunes, António | 1900013 | 1962-02-06 | Lisbon | | 1994 | Portugal | M | |
| Apicella, Manuel | 600164 | 1970-04-19 | Longjumeau | | 1995 | France | M | |
| Appel, Ralf | 4600924 | 1971-07-18 | Pirmasens | | 2008 | Germany | M | title application |
| Arakhamia-Grant, Ketevan | 13600168 | 1968-07-19 | Ochamchire | | 2009 | Scotland | F | title application |
| Aravindh Chithambaram | 5072786 | 1999-09-11 | Thirunagar | | 2015 | India | M | (Note: Di Felice and IM application give Aravindh's birth date as 11 Sep 1999, GM application has 15 Sep 1999) |
| Arbakov, Valentin | 4100620 | 1952-01-28 | | 2003-11-30 | 1994 | Russia | M | |
| Ardiansyah | 7100027 | 1951-12-05 | Banjarmasin | 2017-10-28 | 1986 | Indonesia | M | in some sources "Ardiansyah, H" or "Adiansyah, Hasan" (Note: FIDE rating lists from 1975 to 2017 list Ardiansyah as "Ardiansyah, H" and some sources such as Di Felice and FIDE Golden Book indicate his name was Hasan. Indonesian sources say that "H" is an abbreviation for the Muslim honorific Hajji and that his name was simply Ardiansyah. "Ardiansyah (1951–2017)", IndonesiaBase, 24 January 2010. "Granmaster Catur Indonesia, Ardiansyah, Meninggal Dunia" [Indonesian Chess Grandmaster, Ardiansyah, Passes Away], Tempo.co (in Indonesian), 30 October 2017.) |
| Arenas, David | 4403177 | 1991-12-24 | Envigado | | 2017 | Colombia | M | title application |
| Arencibia Rodríguez, Walter | 3500012 | 1967-07-21 | Holguín | | 1990 | Cuba | M | |
| Areshchenko, Alexander | 14109530 | 1986-06-15 | Luhansk | | 2002 | Ukraine | M | |
| Arizmendi Martínez, Julen Luís | 2205092 | 1976-07-05 | Weekawken | | 2004 | Spain | M | title application |
| Arkell, Keith C. | 400270 | 1961-01-08 | Birmingham | | 1995 | England | M | |
| Arkhipov, Sergey | 4101146 | 1954-06-23 | Moscow | | 1991 | Russia | M | |
| Árnason, Jón L. | 2300036 | 1960-11-13 | Reykjavík | | 1986 | Iceland | M | |
| Arnaudov, G. Petar | 2907127 | 1986-08-08 | Plovdiv | | 2013 | Bulgaria | M | title application |
| Arnold, Marc | 2022320 | 1992-11-20 | New York City | | 2012 | United States | M | title application |
| Aronian, Levon | 13300474 | 1982-10-06 | Yerevan | | 2000 | Armenia | M | later Germany; currently United States |
| Aroshidze, Levan | 13601865 | 1985-07-09 | Tbilisi | | 2006 | Georgia | M | title application; currently Spain |
| Arribas Lopez, Angel | 2283352 | 1993-11-27 | Madrid | | 2014 | Spain | M | title application |
| Artemiev, Vladislav | 24101605 | 1998-03-05 | Omsk | | 2014 | Russia | M | title application |
| Arun Prasad, S. | 5011167 | 1988-04-21 | Salem | | 2008 | India | M | title application |
| Arutinian, David | 13601741 | 1984-05-31 | Tbilisi | | 2006 | Georgia | M | title application |
| Arzumanian, Georgii | 13300660 | 1980-08-16 | Tbilisi | | 2009 | Armenia | M | title application; currently Austria |
| Asadli, Vugar | 13405764 | 2001-10-09 | Baku | | 2019 | Azerbaijan | M | title application |
| Asanov, Bolat | 13700049 | 1961-05-07 | Alma-Ata | | 1994 | Kazakhstan | M | |
| Aseev, Konstantin | 4100247 | 1960-10-20 | Novokuznetsk | 2004-08-22 | 1992 | Russia | M | |
| Ashley, Maurice | 2001012 | 1966-03-06 | Saint Andrew | | 2000 | United States | M | |
| Asis Gargatagli, Hipolito | 2260735 | 1986-08-17 | Barcelona | | 2019 | Spain | M | title application |
| Askarov, Marat | 4141229 | 1987-06-29 | Kazan | | 2008 | Russia | M | title application (Note: Di Felice gives Askarov's title year as 2007, but the FIDE Golden Book and the FIDE Chess Profile have 2008 as the title award year. The title application was considered at the 1st quarter Presidential Board Meeting 2008, 21-22 December 2007, Singapore.) |
| Asrian, Karen | 13300490 | 1980-04-24 | Yerevan | 2008-06-09 | 1998 | Armenia | M | |
| Assaubayeva, Bibisara | 13708694 | 2004-02-26 | | | 2025 | Kazakhstan | F | title application |
| Aswath, S | 46694919 | 2008 | | | 2026 | India | M | GM title application |
| Atabayev, Maksat | 14001101 | 1994-12-28 | Gypjak | | 2015 | Turkmenistan | M | title application |
| Atabayev, Saparmyrat | 14000571 | 1999-05-30 | Ashgabat | | 2025 | Turkmenistan | M | title application; IM title application |
| Atabayev, Yusup | 14001128 | 1994-05-11 | Ashgabat | | 2023 | Turkmenistan | M | title application |
| Atalık, Suat | 14401487 | 1964-10-10 | Istanbul | | 1994 | Turkey | M | later Bosnia and Herzegovina; currently Serbia |
| Atanasov, Anthony | 2623897 | 2008 | | | 2026 | Canada | M | IM title application; winner World Youth Chess Championship 2026 Open U-18 |
| Averbakh, Yuri L. | 4101529 | 1922-02-08 | Kaluga | 2022-05-07 | 1952 | Soviet Union | M | ; later Russia |
| Aveskulov, Valeriy | 14109743 | 1986-01-31 | Antratsyt | | 2006 | Ukraine | M | title application |
| Avila Pavas, Santiago | 4437128 | 2004 | | | 2023 | Colombia | M | title application |
| Avrukh, Boris | 2803895 | 1978-02-10 | Karaganda | | 1997 | Israel | M | currently United States |
| Azarov, Sergei | 13501470 | 1983-05-19 | Minsk | | 2003 | Belarus | M | title application |
| Azmaiparashvili, Zurab | 13601326 | 1960-03-16 | Tbilisi | | 1988 | Soviet Union | M | currently Georgia |
| Babaev, Rashad | 13400681 | 1981-09-03 | Baku | | 2007 | Azerbaijan | M | |
| Babujian, Levon | 13301993 | 1986-05-08 | Yerevan | | 2010 | Armenia | M | title application |
| Babula, Vlastimil | 301264 | 1973-10-02 | Uherský Brod | | 1997 | Czech Republic | M | |
| Baburin, Alexander | 2500914 | 1967-02-19 | Nizhny Novgorod | | 1996 | Ireland | M | |
| Bacallao Alonso, Yusnel | 3507416 | 1988-06-21 | Matanzas | | 2012 | Cuba | M | title application |
| Bachmann, Axel | 3700488 | 1989-11-04 | Ciudad del Este | | 2007 | Paraguay | M | title application |
| Bacrot, Étienne | 605506 | 1983-01-22 | Lille | | 1997 | France | M | |
| Badea, Bela | 1200038 | 1969-02-21 | Aiud | | 1999 | Romania | M | |
| Bagaturov, Giorgi | 13600133 | 1964-11-28 | | | 1999 | Georgia | M | |
| Baghdasaryan, Vahe | 13303139 | 1993-03-20 | Yerevan | | 2017 | Armenia | M | title application |
| Bagheri, Amir | 12500283 | 1978-09-20 | | | 2003 | Iran | M | later France and Iran; currently Monaco |
| Bagirov, Rufat | 13400401 | 1979-10-10 | | | 2002 | Azerbaijan | M | |
| Bagirov, Vladimir | 11600063 | 1936-08-16 | Batumi | 2000-07-21 | 1978 | Soviet Union | M | later Latvia |
| Bagrationi, Alexander | 14104954 | 1990-07-13 | | | 2014 | Ukraine | M | title application; currently Israel |
| Bai Jinshi | 8602280 | 1999-05-18 | Jilin | | 2015 | China | M | title application |
| Baidetskyi, Valentin | 14142317 | 2002 | | | 2026 | Austria | M | GM title application |
| Bailet, Pierre | 655830 | 1988-10-15 | Nice | | 2022 | France | M | title application; IM title application |
| Bajarani, Ulvi | 13403028 | 1995-01-27 | Baku | | 2013 | Azerbaijan | M | title application |
| Baklan, Vladimir | 14102196 | 1978-02-25 | Kyiv | | 1998 | Ukraine | M | |
| Bakre, Tejas | 5004195 | 1981-05-12 | Ahmedabad | | 2004 | India | M | |
| Balakrishnan, Praveen | 2064871 | 2002-05-21 | Irvine, California | | 2021 | United States | M | title application; IM title application |
| Balashov, Yuri S. | 4100263 | 1949-03-12 | Shadrinsk | | 1973 | Soviet Union | M | currently Russia |
| Baldauf, Marco | 4688210 | 1990-04-16 | Rosenheim | | 2019 | Germany | M | title application |
| Balinas, Rosendo Jr. | 5200075 | 1941-09-10 | Manila | 1998-09-24 | 1976 | Philippines | M | |
| Balinov, Ilia | 1610201 | 1966-07-28 | Batak | | 1999 | Austria | M | |
| Balog, Imre | 728446 | 1991-10-28 | Békéscsaba | | 2011 | Hungary | M | title application |
| Balogh, Csaba | 718939 | 1987-03-10 | Budapest | | 2004 | Hungary | M | |
| Banikas, Hristos | 4202031 | 1978-05-20 | Thessaloniki | | 2001 | Greece | M | |
| Bánusz, Tamás | 722413 | 1989-04-08 | Mohács | | 2011 | Hungary | M | title application |
| Baramidze, David | 4667719 | 1988-09-27 | Tbilisi | | 2004 | Germany | M | |
| Barbero, Gerardo | 100048 | 1961-08-21 | Lanús | 2001-03-04 | 1987 | Argentina | M | |
| Barbosa, Evandro Amorim | 2115824 | 1992-08-24 | São Sebastião do Paraíso | | 2016 | Brazil | M | title application |
| Barbosa, Oliver | 5201640 | 1986-09-29 | Pasig | | 2011 | Philippines | M | title application |
| Barcenilla, Rogelio | 5200059 | 1972-01-23 | Bacolod | | 2010 | Philippines | M | title application (Note: Di Felice lists 2009 as Bercenilla's title year, but the FIDE Chess Profile and the FIDE Golden Book show the title was awarded in 2010. The title application was considered at the 80th FIDE Congress 2009, 11-18 October 2009, Halkidiki, GRE.) |
| Barcza, Gedeon | | 1911-08-21 | Kisújszállás | 1986-02-27 | 1954 | Hungary | M | Gaige |
| Bárczay, László | 700851 | 1936-02-21 | Miskolc | 2016-04-07 | 1967 | Hungary | M | |
| Bareev, Evgeny | 4100140 | 1966-11-21 | Yemanzhelinsk | | 1989 | Soviet Union | M | later Russia; currently Canada |
| Barlov, Dragan | 900214 | 1957-01-30 | Kragujevac | | 1986 | Yugoslavia | M | currently Serbia |
| Baron, Tal | 2809958 | 1992-08-07 | | | 2011 | Israel | M | title application |
| Barrientos, Sergio E. | 4401824 | 1986-06-29 | Medellín | | 2011 | Colombia | M | title application |
| Barsov, Alexei | 14200082 | 1966-04-03 | Samarkand | | 2000 | Uzbekistan | M | |
| Bartel, Mateusz | 1112635 | 1985-01-03 | Warsaw | | 2005 | Poland | M | title application |
| Barua, Dibyendu | 5000025 | 1966-10-27 | Chittagong | | 1991 | India | M | |
| Barus, Cerdas | 7100094 | 1962-01-01 | Kabanjahe | | 2003 | Indonesia | M | |
| Baryshpolets, Andrey | 14117207 | 1991-01-16 | Kyiv | | 2013 | Ukraine | M | title application |
| Basso, Pier Luigi | 866970 | 1997-12-15 | Montebelluna | | 2018 | Italy | M | title application |
| Batchuluun, Tsegmed | 4900847 | 1987-02-04 | Ulaanbaatar | | 2012 | Mongolia | M | title application |
| Batsiashvili, Nino | 13602993 | 1987-01-01 | Batumi | | 2018 | Georgia | F | title application |
| Batsüren, Dambasürengiin | 4902920 | 2004-01-22 | | | 2020 | Mongolia | M | title application |
| Batyrov, Sapar | 14000237 | 1967-11-29 | | | 1998 | Turkmenistan | M | |
| Bauer, Christian | 603767 | 1977-01-11 | Forbach | | 1997 | France | M | |
| Becerra Rivero, Julio | 3501728 | 1973-10-15 | Havana | | 1997 | Cuba | M | currently United States |
| Bedia, Melor | 4137752 | 1979-09-26 | | | 2011 | Russia | M | title application |
| Beerdsen, Thomas | 1030108 | 1998-09-13 | Apeldoorn | | 2023 | Netherlands | M | title application; IM title application; certificat of GM title result |
| Begmuratov, Khumoyun | 14210207 | 2010 | | | 2026 | Uzbekistan | M | GM title application |
| Beim, Valeri | 1613782 | 1950-03-17 | | | 1994 | Israel | M | currently Austria |
| Beliavsky, Alexander G. | 14602377 | 1953-12-17 | Lviv | | 1975 | Soviet Union | M | later Ukraine; currently Slovenia |
| Belikov, Vladimir | 4103904 | 1971-08-02 | | | 2000 | Russia | M | |
| Belkhodja, Slim | 600229 | 1962-11-23 | | | 2002 | Tunisia | M | currently France |
| Bellahcene, Bilel | 696358 | 1998-03-14 | Strasbourg | | 2018 | France | M | title application; currently Algeria |
| Bellón López, Juan Manuel | 2200031 | 1950-05-08 | Valencia | | 1978 | Spain | M | |
| Belous, Vladimir | 4174003 | 1993-07-29 | Kamensk-Shakhtinsky | | 2013 | Russia | M | title application |
| Belov, Vladimir | 4132394 | 1984-08-06 | Kirzhach | | 2003 | Russia | M | |
| Belozerov, Andrei | 4120213 | 1977-06-17 | | | 2002 | Russia | M | |
| Benidze, Davit | 13603086 | 1991-02-15 | Kutaisi | | 2013 | Georgia | M | title application |
| Benjamin, Joel | 2000091 | 1964-03-11 | New York City | | 1986 | United States | M | |
| Benko, Pal | 2000687 | 1928-07-15 | Amiens | 2019-08-26 | 1958 | United States | M | Gaige; Di Felice |
| Bérczes, Dávid | 722960 | 1990-01-14 | Borås | | 2008 | Hungary | M | title application |
| Berdayes Ason, Dylan Isidro | 3516016 | 1998-05-15 | Havana | | 2023 | Cuba | M | title application; IM title application |
| Berdichevski, Igor | 4105249 | 1964-07-15 | Moscow | | 1996 | Russia | M | |
| Berelowitsch, Alexander | 14101440 | 1967-07-02 | Kharkiv | | 1997 | Ukraine | M | previously Aleksandar Berelovich; currently Germany |
| Berescu, Alin-Mile | 1204920 | 1980-04-14 | Timișoara | | 2007 | Romania | M | title application |
| Berg, Emanuel | 1704060 | 1981-12-28 | Skövde | | 2004 | Sweden | M | title application |
| Berkes, Ferenc | 718572 | 1985-08-08 | Baja | | 2002 | Hungary | M | |
| Bernadskiy, Vitaliy | 14100371 | 1994-10-17 | Chernovtsy | | 2014 | Ukraine | M | title application |
| Bernášek, Jan | 311995 | 1986-05-31 | Moravská Třebová | | 2013 | Czech Republic | M | title application |
| Bernstein, Ossip | | 1882-10-02 | Zhytomyr | 1962-11-30 | 1950 | France | M | Gaige; born 2 Oct [O.S. 20 Sep] |
| Beshukov, Sergei | 4105451 | 1971-04-01 | | 2024-06-08 | 1994 | Russia | M | |
| Bezgodov, Alexei | 4105257 | 1969-06-30 | | | 1999 | Russia | M | |
| Bezold, Michael | 4601718 | 1972-05-23 | Bayreuth | | 1998 | Germany | M | |
| Bharathakoti, Harsha | 5078776 | 2000-02-07 | Guntur | | 2019 | India | M | title application |
| Bhat, Vinay | 2011352 | 1984-06-04 | Santa Clara | | 2008 | United States | M | title application |
| Bilgüün, Sumiya | 4901541 | 1997-03-25 | | | 2020 | Mongolia | M | title application |
| Bilek, István | 700525 | 1932-08-11 | Budapest | 2010-03-20 | 1962 | Hungary | M | |
| Bindrich, Falko | 4676670 | 1990-10-17 | Zittau | | 2007 | Germany | M | title application |
| Bischoff, Klaus | 4600045 | 1961-06-09 | Ulm | | 1990 | West Germany | M | currently Germany |
| Bisguier, Arthur | 2001098 | 1929-10-08 | New York City | 2017-04-05 | 1957 | United States | M | |
| Bistrić, Faruk | 14400294 | 1958-10-01 | Sarajevo | | 2003 | Bosnia and Herzegovina | M | title application |
| Bitoon, Richard | 5201110 | 1975-12-14 | Cebu | | 2011 | Philippines | M | title application |
| Biyiasas, Peter | 2000431 | 1950-11-19 | Athens | | 1978 | Canada | M | currently United States |
| Bjerre, Jonas Buhl | 1444948 | 2004-06-26 | | | 2020 | Denmark | M | title application; IM title application |
| Blagojević, Dragiša | 900885 | 1966-01-01 | Tuzla | | 2004 | Serbia and Montenegro | M | title application; currently Montenegro |
| Blatný, Pavel | 300047 | 1968-06-22 | Brno | | 1993 | Czech Republic | M | |
| Blehm, Paweł | 1107836 | 1980-04-17 | Olkusz | | 2001 | Poland | M | |
| Blohberger, Felix | 1632051 | 2002-08-20 | Vienna | | 2022 | Austria | M | title application; IM title application |
| Blomqvist, Erik | 1709437 | 1990-10-19 | Stockholm | | 2013 | Sweden | M | title application |
| Blübaum, Matthias | 24651516 | 1997-04-18 | Lemgo | | 2015 | Germany | M | title application |
| Bluvshtein, Mark | 2603608 | 1988-04-20 | Yaroslavl | | 2004 | Canada | M | title application |
| Bobotsov, Milko | 2900270 | 1931-10-30 | Plovdiv | 2000-04-03 | 1961 | Bulgaria | M | |
| Bobras, Piotr | 1106880 | 1977-09-09 | Białystok | | 2005 | Poland | M | title application |
| Bocharov, Dmitry | 4138716 | 1982-10-20 | Novosibirsk | | 2003 | Russia | M | |
| Bocharov, Ivan | 4180887 | 1990-01-06 | Berdsk | | 2020 | Russia | M | title application |
| Bogdanov, Egor | 14119137 | 1996-04-23 | | | 2024 | Ukraine | M | title application |
| Bogdanovich, Stanislav | 14115298 | 1993-02-04 | Odesa | 2020-03-05 | 2017 | Ukraine | M | title application |
| Bogdanovski, Vlatko | 15000206 | 1964-12-31 | | | 1993 | North Macedonia | M | |
| Bogner, Sebastian | 4692055 | 1991-01-17 | Pforzheim | | 2009 | Germany | M | title application; currently Switzerland |
| Bogoljubow, Efim | | 1889-04-14 | Stanislavchyk near Kyiv | 1952-06-18 | 1951 | West Germany | M | Gaige |
| Bogosavljević, Boban | 931152 | 1988-04-26 | Vršac | | 2008 | Serbia | M | title application |
| Bojkov, Dejan | 2904292 | 1977-07-03 | Shumen | | 2008 | Bulgaria | M | title application |
| Bok, Benjamin | 1017063 | 1995-01-25 | Lelystad | | 2014 | Netherlands | M | title application |
| Bolbochán, Julio | | 1920-03-20 | Buenos Aires | 1996-06-28 | 1977 | Argentina | M | honorary |
| Boleslavsky, Isaac | | 1919-06-09 | Zolotonosha | 1977-02-15 | 1950 | Soviet Union | M | Gaige; Di Felice |
| Bologan, Victor | 13900048 | 1971-12-14 | Chișinău | | 1991 | Moldova | M | |
| Bondarevsky, Igor | | 1913-05-12 | Rostov-on-Don | 1979-06-14 | 1950 | Soviet Union | M | Gaige; Di Felice |
| Bönsch, Uwe | 4611268 | 1958-10-15 | Halle (Saale) | | 1986 | West Germany | M | currently Germany |
| Böök, Eero | | 1910-02-09 | Helsinki | 1990-01-07 | 1984 | Finland | M | honorary |
| Bora, Safal | 2066149 | 1998-05-19 | Michigan | | 2025 | United States | M | title application; IM title application |
| Borges Mateos, Juan | 3500160 | 1966-03-28 | Caimanera | | 2004 | Cuba | M | |
| Borišek, Jure | 14603152 | 1986-07-27 | Šempeter pri Gorici | | 2009 | Slovenia | M | title application (Note: Di Felice lists Borišek's title year as 2008, but the FIDE Chess Profile and the FIDE Golden Book have 2009.) |
| Boros, Dénes | 722340 | 1988-04-30 | Budapest | | 2009 | Hungary | M | title application |
| Borovikov, Vladislav | 14102811 | 1973-08-10 | | | 2001 | Ukraine | M | |
| Bortnyk, Olexandr | 14120828 | 1996-10-18 | Oleksandrivka | | 2015 | Ukraine | M | title application |
| Boruchovsky, Avital | 2800055 | 1997-03-15 | Israel | | 2014 | Israel | M | title application |
| Bosiočić, Marin | 14507927 | 1988-08-08 | Rijeka | | 2008 | Croatia | M | title application |
| Botvinnik, Mikhail | | 1911-08-17 | Kuokkala | 1995-05-05 | 1950 | Soviet Union | M | later Russia |
| Bouaziz, Slim | 5500010 | 1950-04-16 | Tunis | | 1993 | Tunisia | M | |
| Boyer, Mahel | 45102422 | 2004 | | | 2025 | France | M | title application |
| Brandenburg, Daan | 1011014 | 1987-11-14 | Lelystad | | 2011 | Netherlands | M | title application |
| Braun, Arik | 4663527 | 1988-02-08 | Aresing | | 2008 | Germany | M | title application |
| Brenjo, Slaviša | 913723 | 1974-04-02 | Nevesinje | | 2009 | Serbia | M | title application |
| Bricard, Emmanuel | 600245 | 1966-05-04 | Versailles | | 2005 | France | M | title application |
| Brkić, Ante | 14506688 | 1988-03-31 | Stari Mikanovci | | 2007 | Croatia | M | title application |
| Brodsky, David | 2073250 | 2002-08-19 | Mount Kisco, New York | | 2022 | United States | M | title application |
| Brodsky, Michail | 14100932 | 1969-03-27 | Kharkiv | | 1994 | Ukraine | M | |
| Bromberger, Stefan | 4635248 | 1982-03-19 | Neuss | | 2014 | Germany | M | title application |
| Bronstein, David | 4101359 | 1924-02-19 | Belaya Tserkov | 2006-12-05 | 1950 | Soviet Union | M | later Russia |
| Brown, Michael | 2037602 | 1997-08-24 | Irvine, California | | 2019 | United States | M | title application |
| Browne, Walter | 2000210 | 1949-01-10 | Sydney | 2015-06-24 | 1970 | Australia | M | later United States |
| Brunello, Sabino | 813613 | 1989-06-27 | Lovere | | 2010 | Italy | M | title application |
| Brunner, Lucas | 1300024 | 1967-05-29 | Bern | | 1994 | Switzerland | M | |
| Bruzón Batista, Lázaro | 3503739 | 1982-05-02 | Holguín | | 1999 | Cuba | M | currently United States |
| Bryakin, Mikhail | 4165314 | 1997-01-09 | | | 2022 | Russia | M | title application; IM title application; currently Serbia |
| Brynell, Stellan | 1700219 | 1962-09-28 | | | 2001 | Sweden | M | |
| Bryzgalin, Kirill | 4133285 | 1982-12-14 | Sochi | | 2008 | Russia | M | title application (Note: Di Felice lists Bryzgalin's title year as 2007, but the FIDE Chess Profile and the FIDE Golden Book give 2008.) |
| Bu Xiangzhi | 8601445 | 1985-12-10 | Qingdao | | 2000 | China | M | |
| Budisavljević, Luka | 960047 | 2004-01-22 | Belgrade | | 2021 | Serbia | M | title application |
| Buhmann, Rainer | 4651340 | 1981-02-20 | Leimen | | 2007 | Germany | M | title application |
| Bùi, Vinh | 12400726 | 1976-12-25 | | | 2008 | Vietnam | M | title application |
| Bukavshin, Ivan | 4199758 | 1995-05-03 | Rostov-on-Don | 2016-01-12 | 2011 | Russia | M | title application |
| Bukić, Enver | 14600030 | 1937-12-02 | Banja Luka | 2017-02-22 | 1976 | Yugoslavia | M | later Slovenia |
| Bulski, Krzysztof | 1121499 | 1987-02-12 | Częstochowa | 2020-12-17 | 2012 | Poland | M | title application |
| Bunzmann, Dimitrij | 4634284 | 1982-02-21 | Tekeli | | 2003 | Germany | M | |
| Burg, Twan | 1010697 | 1990-04-02 | Schijndel | | 2015 | Netherlands | M | title application |
| Burke, John M. | 2070901 | 2001-07-01 | Neptune City, New Jersey | | 2018 | United States | M | title application |
| Burmakin, Vladimir | 4105109 | 1967-06-06 | | | 1994 | Russia | M | |
| Butnorius, Algimantas | 12800066 | 1946-11-20 | Kaunas | 2017-10-30 | 2007 | Lithuania | M | later Monaco |
| Bykhovsky, Anatoly | 2806991 | 1988-11-19 | Samara | | 2010 | Israel | M | title application |
| Bykhovsky, Avigdor | 4101057 | 1955-03-05 | Moscow | | 1993 | Russia | M | currently Israel |
| Byrne, Robert | 2000385 | 1928-04-20 | New York City | 2013-04-12 | 1964 | United States | M | Gaige; Di Felice |
| Cabrera, Alexis | 3502783 | 1976-12-25 | Matanzas | | 2004 | Colombia | M | currently Spain |
| Čabrilo, Goran | 900249 | 1958-07-01 | Goražde | | 1995 | Yugoslavia (S&M) | M | currently Serbia |
| Cámpora, Daniel H. | 100013 | 1957-06-30 | San Nicolás de los Arroyos | | 1986 | Argentina | M | |
| Campos Moreno, Javier B. | 3400034 | 1959-03-06 | Santiago | | 2005 | Chile | M | title application |
| Can, Emre | 6302181 | 1990-01-21 | İzmir | | 2010 | Turkey | M | title application |
| Can, Işık | 6383742 | 2005-04-20 | | | 2025 | Turkey | M | title application; IM title application |
| Canal, Esteban | | 1896-04-19 | Chiclayo | 1981-02-14 | 1977 | Peru | M | honorary; later Italy |
| Cao Sang | 725056 | 1973-09-06 | | | 2003 | Hungary | M | currently Vietnam |
| Cardoso Cardoso, Jose Gabriel | 4430492 | 2004 | | | 2022 | Colombia | M | title application |
| Carlsen, Magnus | 1503014 | 1990-11-30 | Tønsberg | | 2004 | Norway | M | |
| Carlsson, Pontus | 1705814 | 1982-12-18 | Cali | | 2007 | Sweden | M | title application |
| Caruana, Fabiano | 2020009 | 1992-07-30 | Miami | | 2007 | Italy | M | title application; currently United States |
| Caspi, Israel | 2807394 | 1989 | | | 2021 | Israel | M | title application |
| Castañeda, Georgui | 3800954 | 1976-08-02 | Mytishchi | | 2009 | Peru | M | title application; born Georgy Kastanieda |
| Castellanos Rodriguez, Renier | 3404650 | 1982-07-03 | Matanzas | | 2024 | Spain | M | title application; IM title application |
| Cebalo, Mišo | 14500094 | 1945-02-06 | Zagreb | 2022-09-02 | 1985 | Yugoslavia | M | later Croatia |
| Chabanon, Jean-Luc | 600075 | 1971-08-13 | Clermont-Ferrand | | 2001 | France | M | |
| Chadaev, Nikolai | 4167392 | 1988-07-09 | Smolensk | | 2010 | Russia | M | title application |
| Chanda, Sandipan | 5004225 | 1983-08-13 | Kolkata | | 2003 | India | M | |
| Chandler, Murray G. | 400050 | 1960-04-04 | Wellington | | 1983 | New Zealand | M | later England; currently New Zealand |
| Chandra, Akshat | 25006711 | 1999-05-28 | Livingston, New Jersey | | 2017 | United States | M | title application |
| Charbonneau, Pascal | 2602504 | 1983-05-06 | Montreal | | 2006 | Canada | M | |
| Charnushevich, Aliaksei | 13500767 | 1978-12-18 | Lida | | 2012 | France | M | title application |
| Chasin, Nico | 30908477 | 2006 | | | 2026 | United States | M | GM title application |
| Chatalbashev, Boris | 2900440 | 1974-01-30 | Pleven | | 1997 | Bulgaria | M | currently Denmark |
| Chatterjee, Koustav | 25073060 | 2003-07-21 | Kolkata | | 2023 | India | M | title application |
| Checa, Nicolas | 2069342 | 2001-12-19 | New York City | | 2019 | United States | M | title application |
| Chekhov, Valery A. | 4100859 | 1955-11-27 | Moscow | | 1984 | Soviet Union | M | currently Russia |
| Cheng, Bobby | 4300033 | 1997-03-20 | Hamilton, New Zealand | | 2019 | Australia | M | title application |
| Cheparinov, Ivan | 2905540 | 1986-11-26 | Asenovgrad | | 2004 | Bulgaria | M | title application; later Georgia; currently Bulgaria |
| Cherniaev, Alexander | 4117301 | 1969-08-26 | Arkhangelsk | | 2004 | Russia | M | currently England |
| Chernikov, Oleg | 4103289 | 1936-10-15 | Nizhny Novgorod | 2015-02-06 | 2000 | Russia | M | winner 2000 World Senior Chess Championship |
| Chernin, Alexander | 715620 | 1960-03-06 | Kharkiv | | 1985 | Soviet Union | M | currently Hungary |
| Chernobay, Artem | 4167406 | 1989-06-23 | Fryazino | | 2011 | Russia | M | title application (Note: Di Felice gives Chernobay's date of birth as 11 Jun 1989, but his GM title application says 23 June.) |
| Chernyshov, Konstantin | 4117328 | 1967-06-11 | | | 2000 | Russia | M | |
| Chibukhchian, Artur | 13300717 | 1979-10-06 | Tbilisi | | 2009 | Armenia | M | title application |
| Chiburdanidze, Maia | 13600036 | 1961-01-17 | Kutaisi | | 1984 | Soviet Union | F | currently Georgia |
| Chigaev, Maksim | 4108116 | 1996-11-07 | Kemerovo | | 2016 | Russia | M | title application; currently Spain |
| Chirilă, Ioan-Cristian | 1211668 | 1991-01-06 | Bucharest | | 2009 | Romania | M | title application (Note: Di Felice lists 27 January 1991 as Chirilă's date of birth.) |
| Chopra, Aryan | 5084423 | 2001-12-10 | Delhi | | 2017 | India | M | title application |
| Christiansen, Johan-Sebastian | 1512668 | 1998-06-10 | | | 2018 | Norway | M | title application |
| Christiansen, Larry | 2000059 | 1956-06-27 | Riverside, California | | 1977 | United States | M | |
| Chuchelov, Vladimir | 201260 | 1969-09-28 | Moscow | | 1995 | Belgium | M | |
| Chuprov, Dmitry | 4119754 | 1978-05-10 | Kurgan | 2012-09-14 | 2008 | Russia | M | title application |
| Cicak, Slavko | 1700588 | 1969-10-25 | Titograd | | 2001 | Sweden | M | |
| Cifuentes Parada, Roberto | 2253488 | 1957-12-21 | Santiago | | 1991 | Netherlands | M | currently Spain |
| Ciocâltea, Victor | | 1932-01-16 | Bucharest | 1983-09-10 | 1978 | Romania | M | |
| Čirić, Dragoljub | 901431 | 1935-11-12 | Novi Sad | 2014-08-17 | 1965 | Yugoslavia | M | later Serbia |
| Čmilytė, Viktorija | 12801259 | 1983-08-06 | Šiauliai | | 2010 | Lithuania | F | title application |
| Čolović, Aleksandar | 15000729 | 1976-01-06 | Skopje | | 2013 | North Macedonia | M | title application |
| Comas Fabregó, Lluis | 2200325 | 1971-06-22 | Santa Eugènia de Berga | | 1999 | Spain | M | |
| Conquest, Stuart C. | 400181 | 1967-03-01 | Ilford | | 1991 | England | M | |
| Córdova, Emilio | 3801497 | 1991-07-08 | Lima | | 2008 | Peru | M | title application |
| Cori, Jorge | 3802272 | 1995-07-30 | Lima | | 2010 | Peru | M | title application (Note: Cori's birth date is given as 30 July 1995 by Di Felice and on his IM title application. His GM title application gives 2 July.) |
| Cori Quispe, Kevin Joel | 3814017 | 1999-08-02 | Lima | | 2018 | Peru | M | title application (Note: Di Felice lists Cori Quispe's birthday as 8 February 1999, but his GM title application has 2 August.); currently Mexico |
| Cornette, Matthieu | 620084 | 1985-09-04 | Bègles | | 2008 | France | M | title application |
| Corrales Jimenez, Fidel | 3506690 | 1987-07-07 | Pinar del Río | | 2009 | Cuba | M | title application; currently United States |
| Costa, Leonardo | 16213955 | 2008 | | | 2025 | Germany | M | title application |
| Cramling, Pia | 1700030 | 1963-04-23 | Stockholm | | 1992 | Sweden | F | |
| Cruz, Cristhian | 3801969 | 1992-02-07 | Lima | | 2012 | Peru | M | title application |
| Csom, István | 700100 | 1940-06-02 | Sátoraljaújhely | 2021-07-28 | 1973 | Hungary | M | |
| Cuartas, Jaime Alexander | 4401190 | 1975-10-28 | Medellín | | 2009 | Colombia | M | title application |
| Cubas, José | 3700267 | 1981-04-09 | Asunción | | 2011 | Paraguay | M | title application |
| Cuenca Jiménez, José Fernando | 2255570 | 1987-03-17 | Granada | | 2015 | Spain | M | title application |
| Cuhendi, Sean Winshand | 7101554 | 1997-11-05 | | | 2018 | Indonesia | M | title application |
| Cvek, Robert | 307424 | 1979-01-06 | Krnov | | 2007 | Czech Republic | M | title application |
| Cvitan, Ognjen | 14500086 | 1961-10-10 | Šibenik | | 1987 | Yugoslavia | M | currently Croatia |
| Cyborowski, Łukasz | 1108760 | 1980-06-21 | Legnica | | 2003 | Poland | M | |
| Czarnota, Paweł | 1121219 | 1988-04-14 | Olkusz | | 2006 | Poland | M | title application |
| Czebe, Attila | 705268 | 1975-12-26 | Budapest | | 2003 | Hungary | M | |
| Daggupati, Balaji | 2090759 | 2005-03-05 | Hayward, California | | 2022 | United States | M | title application; certificate of IM title result |
| Dai, Changren | 8608156 | 1999-01-10 | Tianjin | | 2023 | China | M | title application; IM title application |
| Dake, Arthur | 2001446 | 1910-04-08 | Portland | 2000-04-28 | 1986 | United States | M | honorary |
| Dambacher, Martijn | 1005030 | 1979-10-22 | Venlo | | 2014 | Netherlands | M | title application |
| Damjanović, Mato | 14500639 | 1927-03-23 | Đeletovci | 2011-02-12 | 1964 | Yugoslavia | M | later Croatia |
| Damljanović, Branko | 900125 | 1961-06-17 | Futog | | 1989 | Yugoslavia | M | currently Serbia |
| Daneshvar, Bardiya | 12576468 | 2006-06-21 | Tālesh | | 2023 | Iran | M | title application |
| Danielian, Elina | 13300210 | 1978-08-16 | Baku | | 2010 | Armenia | F | title application |
| Danielian, Oganes | 13300237 | 1974-01-03 | Yerevan | 2016-08-08 | 1999 | Armenia | M | |
| Danielsen, Henrik | 1400185 | 1966-01-21 | | | 1996 | Denmark | M | currently Iceland |
| Danin, Alexandre | 4144031 | 1986-03-14 | Bryansk | | 2011 | Russia | M | title application |
| Đào Thiên Hải | 12400084 | 1978-05-10 | | | 1995 | Vietnam | M | |
| Dardha, Daniel | 240990 | 2005-10-01 | Mortsel | | 2021 | Belgium | M | title application; IM title application |
| Darga, Klaus | 4600150 | 1934-02-24 | Pankow | | 1964 | West Germany | M | Gaige; currently Germany |
| Darini, Pouria | 12502200 | 1991-01-24 | Jiroft | | 2013 | Iran | M | title application |
| Das, Sayantan | 5034426 | 1997-04-08 | | | 2023 | India | M | title application; IM title application |
| Daştan, Muhammed Batuhan | 6300014 | 1997-08-07 | Bursa | | 2016 | Turkey | M | title application |
| Dautov, Rustem | 4623606 | 1965-11-28 | Ufa | | 1990 | Soviet Union | M | currently Germany |
| David, Alberto | 4000013 | 1970-03-26 | Milan | | 1998 | Luxembourg | M | currently Italy |
| Davies, Nigel R | 404420 | 1960-07-31 | Southport | | 1993 | England | M | later Wales and England |
| Davtyan, Artur | 13308327 | 2002-08-27 | Yerevan | | 2026 | Armenia | M | GM title application; IM title application |
| De Vreugt, Dennis | 1003909 | 1980-11-04 | | | 2000 | Netherlands | M | |
| Deac, Bogdan-Daniel | 1226380 | 2001-10-08 | Râmnicu Vâlcea | | 2016 | Romania | M | title application |
| Debashis, Das | 5024854 | 1993-06-27 | Bhubaneswar | | 2013 | India | M | title application |
| Deepan Chakkravarthy, J. | 5011132 | 1987-06-03 | | | 2006 | India | M | |
| De Firmian, Nick | 2000105 | 1957-07-26 | Fresno, California | | 1985 | United States | M | |
| Degraeve, Jean-Marc | 600270 | 1971-01-26 | Tourcoing | | 1998 | France | M | |
| Dehtiarov, Roman | 14186640 | 2008 | | | 2026 | Ukraine | M | winner 2026 European Individual Championship |
| De La Paz Perdomo, Frank | 3501833 | 1975-05-24 | Santa Clara, Cuba | | 2004 | Cuba | M | title application (Note: De La Paz Perdomo's GM title application lists 1973 as his birth year, but Di Felice and other sources give 1975.) |
| De La Riva Aguado, Oscar | 6900224 | 1972-07-15 | Barcelona | | 2004 | Andorra | M | |
| De La Villa Garcia, Jesús Maria | 2200040 | 1958-06-30 | Villahán | | 1999 | Spain | M | |
| Delchev, Aleksander | 2900394 | 1971-07-15 | Sofia | | 1998 | Bulgaria | M | currently Serbia |
| Delgado Ramírez, Neuris | 3503631 | 1981-09-17 | | | 2002 | Cuba | M | later Colombia; currently Paraguay |
| Delorme, Axel | 632023 | 1990-05-08 | Lyon | | 2017 | France | M | title application |
| Del Río De Angelis, Salvador Gabriel | 2203138 | 1976-10-02 | | | 2002 | Spain | M | |
| Dely, Péter | 700207 | 1934-07-05 | Sárospatak | 2012-12-29 | 1999 | Hungary | M | honorary |
| Demchenko, Anton | 4160258 | 1987-08-20 | Novorossiysk | | 2013 | Russia | M | title application; currently Slovenia |
| Demidov, Mikhail | 4197143 | 1992-06-17 | Odintsovo | | 2020 | Russia | M | title application |
| Demuth, Adrien | 642274 | 1991-04-14 | Saint-Denis, Réunion | | 2015 | France | M | title application; currently Switzerland |
| Dengla, Aarav | 45059756 | 2009-07-25 | Mumbai | | 2025 | India | M | GM title application |
| Denker, Arnold | 2002264 | 1914-02-21 | New York City | 2005-01-02 | 1981 | United States | M | honorary |
| Dervishi, Erald | 4700236 | 1979-11-10 | Durrës | | 1998 | Albania | M | |
| Deshmukh, Divya | 35006916 | 2005-12-09 | Nagpur | | 2025 | India | F | winner FIDE Women's World Cup 2025; WIM title application |
| Deuer, Marius | 16236432 | 2008 | | | 2026 | Germany | M | GM title application |
| Deviatkin, Andrei | 4121260 | 1980-10-07 | Moscow | | 2008 | Russia | M | title application |
| Dgebuadze, Alexandre | 203882 | 1971-05-21 | | | 2000 | Soviet Union | M | later Georgia; currently Belgium |
| Diamant, André | 2108356 | 1990-02-09 | Fortaleza | | 2009 | Brazil | M | title application |
| Diermair, Andreas | 1612468 | 1986-09-29 | Deutschlandsberg | | 2018 | Austria | M | title application |
| Díez del Corral, Jesús | 2200155 | 1933-04-06 | Zaragoza | 2010-02-19 | 1974 | Spain | M | |
| Dimitrov, Radoslav | 2908549 | 1993-03-27 | Veliko Tarnovo | | 2018 | Bulgaria | M | title application |
| Dimitrov, Vladimir | 2900050 | 1968-04-11 | Sofia | | 1993 | Bulgaria | M | |
| Ding Liren | 8603677 | 1992-10-24 | Wenzhou | | 2009 | China | M | title application |
| Dizdar, Goran | 14500124 | 1958-12-04 | Zagreb | | 1991 | Yugoslavia | M | currently Croatia |
| Dizdarević, Emir | 14400049 | 1958-04-02 | Zenica | | 1988 | Yugoslavia | M | later Croatia; currently Bosnia and Herzegovina |
| Djukić, Nikola | 922412 | 1983-01-26 | Titograd | | 2005 | Serbia and Montenegro | M | title application; currently Montenegro |
| Djurhuus, Rune | 1500082 | 1970-01-25 | Elverum | | 1996 | Norway | M | |
| Đurić, Stefan | 900133 | 1955-07-26 | Belgrade | | 1982 | Yugoslavia | M | currently Serbia |
| Dlugy, Maxim | 2000075 | 1966-01-29 | Moscow | | 1986 | United States | M | |
| Dobrov, Vladimir | 4136594 | 1984-04-13 | Moscow | | 2004 | Russia | M | |
| Dokhoian, Yury | 4100476 | 1964-10-26 | Zyryanovka | 2021-07-01 | 1988 | Soviet Union | M | later Russia |
| Dolmatov, Sergey | 4100093 | 1959-02-20 | Kiselyovsk | | 1982 | Soviet Union | M | currently Russia |
| Domínguez Pérez, Leinier | 3503240 | 1983-09-23 | Havana | | 2001 | United States | M | (Note: Di Felice states the title year as 2000, but FIDE Golden Book has 2001 and Domínguez was still noted as "m" in the FIDE July 2001 rating list.) later Cuba; currently United States |
| Domogaev, Sergey | 24103608 | 1964-11-07 | Kireyevsk | | 2012 | Russia | M | title application |
| Donchenko, Alexander | 24603295 | 1998-03-22 | Moscow | | 2015 | Germany | M | title application |
| Donchev, Dimitar I. | 2900025 | 1958-07-21 | Shumen | | 1990 | Bulgaria | M | |
| Donner, Johannes Hendrikus | | 1927-07-06 | The Hague | 1988-11-27 | 1959 | Netherlands | M | |
| Dorfman, Iossif | 604011 | 1952-05-01 | Zhytomyr | | 1978 | Soviet Union | M | (Note: Di Felice and other sources give Dorfman's birth year as 1952. FIDE records used to list 1952 as Dorfman's birth year as well, but his FIDE Chess Profile now says 1953.) currently France |
| Döttling, Fabian | 4627253 | 1980-08-04 | Heilbronn | | 2003 | Germany | M | also spelled Doettling |
| Dourerassou, Jonathan | 628050 | 1989-04-10 | Sarcelles | | 2016 | France | M | title application |
| Dragnev, Valentin | 1634852 | 1999-03-05 | Vienna | | 2018 | Austria | M | title application |
| Dragun, Kamil | 1134167 | 1995-06-25 | Gorzów Wielkopolski | | 2013 | Poland | M | title application |
| Draško, Milan | 900397 | 1962-12-06 | Čapljina | | 1993 | Yugoslavia (S&M) | M | currently Montenegro |
| Drašković, Luka | 944335 | 1995-09-20 | Bar, Montenegro | | 2022 | Montenegro | M | title application |
| Dražić, Siniša | 901172 | 1967-12-16 | Žabalj | | 2000 | Yugoslavia (S&M) | M | currently Serbia |
| Dreev, Aleksey | 4100107 | 1969-01-30 | Stavropol | | 1989 | Russia | M | |
| Drenchev, Petar | 2903261 | 1977-04-25 | Kazanlak | | 2011 | Bulgaria | M | title application |
| Dronavalli, Harika | 5015197 | 1991-01-12 | Gorantla | | 2011 | India | F | title application |
| Drozdovskij, Yuri | 14107180 | 1984-05-22 | Odesa | | 2004 | Ukraine | M | |
| Druska, Juraj | 14915650 | 1994-08-31 | Ružomberok | | 2025 | Slovakia | M | GM title application; IM title application |
| Drygalov, Andrey | 24171735 | 1999-05-19 | Kurgan | | 2021 | Russia | M | title application; IM title application |
| Drygalov, Sergey | 24171743 | 1999-05-19 | Kurgan | | 2022 | Russia | M | title application; IM title application |
| Dubov, Daniil | 24126055 | 1996-04-18 | Moscow | | 2011 | Russia | M | title application |
| Dückstein, Andreas | 1600168 | 1927-08-02 | Budapest | 2024-08-28 | 2024 | Austria | M | honorary |
| Duda, Jan-Krzysztof | 1170546 | 1998-04-26 | Kraków | | 2013 | Poland | M | title application |
| Dudin, Gleb | 34184934 | 2004-10-11 | | | 2023 | Hungary | M | title application |
| Durarbayli, Vasif | 13402935 | 1992-02-24 | Sumgait | | 2010 | Azerbaijan | M | title application |
| Duras, Oldřich | | 1882-10-30 | Prague | 1957-01-05 | 1950 | Czechoslovakia | M | Gaige; Di Felice |
| Dvirnyy, Danyyil | 817570 | 1990-10-21 | Saint Petersburg | | 2014 | Italy | M | title application |
| Dvoirys, Semen I. | 4100379 | 1958-11-02 | Zhmerynka | | 1990 | Russia | M | |
| Dyachkov, Sergej | 4119800 | 1976-11-06 | Saratov | | 2004 | Russia | M | |
| Dydyshko, Viacheslav | 13500031 | 1949-04-10 | Minsk | | 1995 | Belarus | M | |
| Dzagnidze, Nana | 13601903 | 1987-01-01 | Kutaisi | | 2008 | Georgia | F | title application |
| Dzhakaev, Dzhakay | 4136209 | 1980-04-05 | Makhachkala | | 2006 | Russia | M | |
| Dzhumaev, Marat | 14200236 | 1976-01-12 | Samarkand | | 2001 | Uzbekistan | M | |
| Dzindzichashvili, Roman | 2000113 | 1944-05-05 | Tbilisi | | 1977 | Soviet Union | M | later Israel; currently United States |
| Dziuba, Marcin | 1112953 | 1983-07-17 | Zamość | | 2007 | Poland | M | title application |
| Édouard, Romain | 633429 | 1990-11-28 | Poitiers | | 2009 | France | M | title application |
| Efimenko, Zahar | 14107201 | 1985-07-03 | Makiivka | | 2002 | Ukraine | M | |
| Efimov, Igor | 806404 | 1960-09-16 | Tbilisi | | 1992 | Georgia | M | later Italy; currently Monaco |
| Ehlvest, Jaan | 4500016 | 1962-10-14 | Tallinn | | 1987 | Soviet Union | M | later Estonia; currently United States |
| Eingorn, Vereslav S. | 14100053 | 1956-11-23 | Odesa | 2026-08-18 | 1986 | Soviet Union | M | later Ukraine (Note: Di Felice and Gaige 1987 give Eingorn's birthday as 25 November 1956, but other sources have 23 November.) |
| El Debs, Felipe de Cresce | 2106981 | 1985-01-29 | São Carlos | | 2010 | Brazil | M | title application |
| El Gindy, Essam | 10600140 | 1966-07-14 | Cairo | | 2008 | Egypt | M | title application |
| Elias Reyes, Jorge Roberto | 3517470 | 1999 | | | 2026 | Cuba | M | GM title application |
| Eliseev, Urii | 24131920 | 1996-08-29 | Moscow | 2016-11-26 | 2013 | Russia | M | title application (Note: The GM title application for Eliseev gives his birthdate as 29 July 1996, but Di Felice has 29 August.) |
| Eliskases, Erich | | 1913-02-15 | Innsbruck | 1997-02-02 | 1952 | Argentina | M | |
| Eljanov, Pavel | 14102951 | 1983-05-10 | Kharkiv | | 2001 | Ukraine | M | |
| Emms, John M. | 400254 | 1967-03-14 | Norwich | | 1995 | England | M | |
| Enchev, Ivajlo | 2907712 | 1989-09-05 | Razgrad | | 2018 | Bulgaria | M | title application |
| Enders, Peter | 4611314 | 1963-02-02 | | 2025-02-02 | 1997 | Germany | M | |
| Engel, Luis | 12961523 | 2002-10-14 | Hamburg | | 2020 | Germany | M | title application |
| Epishin, Vladimir | 4162714 | 1965-07-11 | Leningrad | | 1990 | Soviet Union | M | currently Russia |
| Erdoğdu, Aziz Mert | 6301495 | 1979-03-30 | Adana | | 2017 | Turkey | M | title application |
| Erdős, Viktor | 719978 | 1987-09-02 | Békéscsaba | | 2007 | Hungary | M | title application |
| Erdoğmuş, Yağız Kaan | 44599790 | 2011-06-30 | Bursa | | 2024 | Turkey | M | title application |
| Erenburg, Sergey | 2805642 | 1983-01-27 | | | 2003 | Israel | M | currently United States |
| Erigaisi Arjun | 35009192 | 2003-09-03 | Karimnagar | | 2018 | India | M | title application |
| Ermenkov, Evgenij | 2900106 | 1949-09-29 | Sofia | | 1977 | Bulgaria | M | |
| Ernst, Sipke | 1004689 | 1979-01-08 | Damwâld | | 2007 | Netherlands | M | title application |
| Ernst, Thomas | 1700065 | 1960-08-17 | Uppsala | | 1990 | Sweden | M | |
| Eryomenko, Volodymyr | 14109328 | 1987-05-05 | Odesa | | 2009 | Ukraine | M | title application |
| Escalante Ramírez, Brian | 3819566 | 1999-09-20 | | | 2024 | Peru | M | title application |
| Escobar Forero, Alder | 4400801 | 1977-03-11 | Colombia | | 2014 | Colombia | M | title application (Note: Escobar Forero's GM title application lists his birth date as 10 March 1977, but Di Felice has 11 March.) |
| Esen, Barış | 6302114 | 1986-11-03 | Antalya | | 2010 | Turkey | M | title application |
| Esipenko, Andrey | 24175439 | 2002-03-22 | Novocherkassk | | 2018 | Russia | M | title application (Note: Esipenko's birthplace is from Chessbase News: Friedel, Frederic (21 September 2018), Guess who came to encourage the Russian Olympiad teams?, ChessBase) |
| Espig, Lutz | 4611276 | 1949-01-05 | Greiz | | 1983 | Germany | M | |
| Espinosa Veloz, Ermes | 3507424 | 1987-07-30 | Villa Clara Province | | 2017 | Cuba | M | title application |
| Euwe, Max | | 1901-05-20 | Watergraafsmeer | 1981-11-26 | 1950 | Netherlands | M | Gaige; Di Felice |
| Evans, Larry | 2000369 | 1932-03-22 | New York City | 2010-11-15 | 1957 | United States | M | |
| Evdokimov, Alexander A. | 4139275 | 1985-10-28 | Astrakhan | | 2005 | Russia | M | title application |
| Fang Yuxiang | 8605840 | 1996-02-29 | Shanxi | | 2017 | China | M | title application |
| Faragó, Iván | 700134 | 1946-04-01 | Budapest | 2022-12-12 | 1976 | Hungary | M | |
| Fargère, François | 615935 | 1985-09-01 | Saint-Rémy, Saône-et-Loire | | 2009 | France | M | title application |
| Fawzy, Adham | 10613129 | 2000-01-03 | Alexandria | | 2019 | Egypt | M | title application |
| Fedorchuk, Sergey A. | 14102536 | 1981-03-14 | | | 2002 | Ukraine | M | |
| Fedorov, Alexei | 13500465 | 1972-09-27 | Mogilev | | 1995 | Belarus | M | |
| Fedorowicz, John | 2000083 | 1958-09-27 | New York City | | 1986 | United States | M | |
| Fedoseev, Vladimir | 24130737 | 1995-02-16 | Saint Petersburg | | 2011 | Russia | M | title application (Note: Fedoseev birthplace from McGourty, Colin (21 March 2017), Howell claims Winter Classic in thrilling finish, chess24); currently Slovenia |
| Felgaer, Rubén | 107069 | 1981-04-04 | Buenos Aires | | 2002 | Argentina | M | |
| Feller, Sébastien | 634654 | 1991-03-11 | Thionville | | 2007 | France | M | title application |
| Ferčec, Nenad | 14500299 | 1961-04-12 | Pula | | 2007 | Croatia | M | title application |
| Fernandes, António | 1900021 | 1962-10-18 | Pampilhosa da Serra | | 2003 | Portugal | M | |
| Fernández Garcia, José Luís | 2200023 | 1954-05-03 | Portugalete | | 1986 | Spain | M | |
| Fernandez Romero, Ernesto | 2214679 | 1983-01-23 | Málaga | | 2018 | Spain | M | title application |
| Fernandez, Daniel | 2015390 | 1985-05-09 | Lima | | 2022 | United States | M | title application; Di Felice |
| Fernandez, Daniel Howard | 5801605 | 1995-03-05 | Stockport | | 2017 | England | M | title application |
| Ferreira, Jorge Viterbo | 1910850 | 1994-06-24 | Porto | | 2018 | Portugal | M | title application |
| Feygin, Michael | 14103109 | 1975-01-02 | Kharkiv | | 2013 | Germany | M | title application |
| Fier, Alexandr | 2107139 | 1988-03-11 | Joinville | | 2007 | Brazil | M | title application |
| Filip, Miroslav | 300098 | 1928-10-27 | Prague | 2009-04-27 | 1955 | Czechoslovakia | M | |
| Filippov, Anton | 14200988 | 1986-06-12 | Tashkent | | 2008 | Uzbekistan | M | title application (Note: Di Felice lists Anton Filippov's birthday as 6 December 1986, but his GM title application has 12 June.) |
| Filippov, Valerij | 4117654 | 1975-11-28 | | | 1996 | Russia | M | |
| Fine, Reuben | | 1914-10-11 | New York City | 1993-03-26 | 1950 | United States | M | |
| Finegold, Benjamin | 2000261 | 1969-09-06 | Detroit | | 2009 | United States | M | title application |
| Finěk, Václav | 23718293 | 2010 | | | 2026 | Czech Republic | M | GM title application |
| Finkel, Alexander | 2801957 | 1975-01-01 | Kamianets-Podilskyi | | 1995 | Israel | M | |
| Fırat, Burak | 6305881 | 1993-01-01 | İzmir | | 2017 | Turkey | M | title application (Note: Fırat's 2017 GM title application gives his birthplace as Barcelona, Spain, but his 2010 IM application listed İzmir, Turkey, as does GM Burak Fırat 2019 yılında merkezimizde derslere başlamıştır [GM Burak Fırat started classes at our center in 2019] (in Turkish)) |
| Firman, Nazar | 14104490 | 1983-03-22 | Lviv | | 2011 | Ukraine | M | title application |
| Firouzja, Alireza | 12573981 | 2003-06-18 | Babol | | 2018 | Iran | M | title application; currently France |
| Fischer, Robert James | 2000016 | 1943-03-09 | Chicago | 2008-01-17 | 1958 | United States | M | |
| Fish, Gennadij | 14102803 | 1973-04-20 | Simferopol | | 2007 | Germany | M | title application |
| Fishbein, Alexander | 2000377 | 1968-05-08 | Leningrad | | 1992 | United States | M | |
| Flear, Glenn C. | 400165 | 1959-02-12 | Leicester | | 1987 | England | M | |
| Flesch, János | | 1933-09-30 | Budapest | 1983-12-09 | 1980 | Hungary | M | |
| Flohr, Salo | | 1908-11-21 | Horodenka | 1983-07-18 | 1950 | Soviet Union | M | Gaige; Di Felice |
| Flom, Gabriel | 621650 | 1986-01-27 | Paris | | 2020 | France | M | title application |
| Flores Ríos, Mauricio | 3408027 | 1990-09-10 | Valparaíso | | 2009 | Chile | M | title application |
| Flores, Diego | 108049 | 1982-12-18 | Las Palmas | | 2008 | Argentina | M | title application |
| Flumbort, András | 717274 | 1984-08-17 | Nagykanizsa | | 2010 | Hungary | M | title application |
| Fodor, Tamas Jr. | 723762 | 1991-06-02 | Kalocsa | | 2013 | Hungary | M | title application |
| Fogarasi, Tibor | 700363 | 1969-11-21 | Szolnok | | 2003 | Hungary | M | |
| Fominyh, Alexander | 4100590 | 1959-06-15 | Novosibirsk | | 1993 | Russia | M | |
| Fontaine, Robert | 605590 | 1980-11-18 | | | 2002 | France | M | later Monaco; currently Switzerland |
| Forcen Esteban, Daniel | 2288230 | 1994-06-12 | Zaragoza | | 2016 | Spain | M | title application |
| Forintos, Győző | 700690 | 1935-07-30 | Budapest | 2018-12-05 | 1974 | Hungary | M | |
| Franco Ocampos, Zenón | 2209381 | 1956-05-12 | Asunción | 2024-10-01 | 1990 | Spain | M | later Paraguay |
| Fressinet, Laurent | 608742 | 1981-11-30 | Dax, Landes | | 2000 | France | M | |
| Fridman, Daniel | 11600454 | 1976-02-15 | Riga | | 2001 | Latvia | M | currently Germany |
| Friedel, Joshua | 2017199 | 1986-12-03 | Goffstown, New Hampshire | | 2008 | United States | M | title application |
| Frolyanov, Dmitry | 4151976 | 1986-05-20 | Tolyatti | | 2007 | Russia | M | title application |
| Ftáčnik, Ľubomír | 14900017 | 1957-10-30 | Bratislava | | 1980 | Slovakia | M | |
| Fuderer, Andrija | 205591 | 1931-05-13 | Subotica | 2011-10-02 | 1990 | Yugoslavia | M | honorary; later Belgium |
| Furman, Semyon | | 1920-12-01 | Pinsk | 1978-03-17 | 1966 | Soviet Union | M | Gaige; Di Felice |
| Gabriel, Christian | 4600967 | 1975-03-03 | Reșița | | 1996 | Germany | M | |
| Gabrielian, Artur | 4131002 | 1982-12-26 | Hrazdan | | 2009 | Russia | M | title application |
| Gabuzyan, Hovhannes | 13303732 | 1995-05-19 | Yerevan | | 2012 | Armenia | M | title application |
| Gadimbayli, Abdulla | 13404938 | 2002-01-02 | Baku | | 2022 | Azerbaijan | M | IM title application; winner 2022 World Junior Chess Championship |
| Gagare, Shardul | 5037883 | 1997-09-02 | Sangamner | | 2016 | India | M | title application |
| Gagunashvili, Merab | 13601652 | 1985-01-03 | Tbilisi | | 2002 | Georgia | M | |
| Gajewski, Grzegorz | 1116207 | 1985-07-19 | Skierniewice | | 2006 | Poland | M | title application |
| Galaviz Medina, Sion Radamantys | 5123119 | 2005 | | | 2025 | Mexico | M | title application |
| Galdunts, Sergey | 13300067 | 1965-01-17 | Baku | | 2003 | Armenia | M | |
| Galego, Luís | 1900072 | 1966-04-25 | | | 2002 | Portugal | M | |
| Gallego Alcaraz, Andres Felipe | 4402669 | 1989-12-10 | Medellín | | 2018 | Colombia | M | title application |
| Galkin, Alexander | 4120426 | 1979-02-01 | Rostov-on-Don | | 1997 | Russia | M | |
| Gallagher, Joseph G. | 1303422 | 1964-05-04 | London | | 1990 | Switzerland | M | |
| Galperin, Platon | 14165414 | 2003-12-10 | | | 2022 | Ukraine | M | title application; currently Sweden |
| Galyas, Miklós | 707244 | 1978-09-25 | | | 2023 | Hungary | M | title application; certificate of GM title result |
| Ganguly, Surya Shekhar | 5002150 | 1983-02-24 | Kolkata | | 2003 | India | M | title application |
| Gao Rui | 8602387 | 1992-05-20 | Qingdao | | 2013 | China | M | title application |
| Gaprindashvili, Nona | 13600125 | 1941-05-03 | Zugdidi | | 1978 | Soviet Union | F | currently Georgia |
| Gaprindashvili, Valeriane | 13601091 | 1982-01-16 | | | 2001 | Georgia | M | FIDE Golden Book (Note: Di Felice gives Valeriane Gaprindashvili's GM title year as 2003, but both the FIDE Golden Book and the FIDE Chess Profile page have 2001.) |
| García, Gildardo | 4400020 | 1954-03-09 | Medellín | 2021-01-15 | 1992 | Colombia | M | |
| García González, Guillermo | | 1953-12-09 | Santa Clara, Cuba | 1990-10-26 | 1976 | Cuba | M | |
| García Ilundáin, David | 2200538 | 1971-04-02 | El Prat de Llobregat | 2002-06-19 | 1996 | Spain | M | |
| García Martínez, Silvino | 3500179 | 1944-07-04 | Havana | | 1975 | Cuba | M | |
| García Palermo, Carlos Horacio | 110124 | 1953-12-02 | La Plata | | 1985 | Argentina | M | currently Italy |
| García Pantoja, Roberto | 3509265 | 1992-10-31 | Havana | | 2019 | Cuba | M | title application; currently Colombia |
| Gareyev, Timur | 14200937 | 1988-03-03 | Tashkent | | 2004 | Uzbekistan | M | currently United States |
| Garriga Cazorla, Pere | 32011601 | 1998-12-14 | Mollet del Vallès | | 2024 | Spain | M | title application; IM title application |
| Gasanov, Eldar | 14104466 | 1982-09-26 | Kharkiv | | 2007 | Ukraine | M | title application |
| Gascón Del Nogal, José Rafael | 3902463 | 1995-05-23 | Caracas | | 2018 | Venezuela | M | title application |
| Gashimov, Vugar | 13400630 | 1986-07-24 | Baku | 2014-01-11 | 2002 | Azerbaijan | M | |
| Gausel, Einar J. | 1500031 | 1963-11-30 | | | 1995 | Norway | M | |
| Gavrikov, Viktor | 12801747 | 1957-07-29 | Criuleni | 2016-04-27 | 1984 | Soviet Union | M | later Lithuania, Switzerland |
| Gavrilescu, David | 1227190 | 2003-03-29 | Craiova | | 2023 | Romania | M | title application; IM title application |
| Gavrilov, Alexei | 4104358 | 1960-10-20 | Moscow | | 2010 | Russia | M | title application |
| Gazarian, Aram | 4127854 | 1983-04-11 | | | 2002 | Russia | M | |
| Gažík, Viktor | 14928752 | 2001-12-13 | | | 2022 | Slovakia | M | title application; IM title application |
| Gdański, Jacek | 1100106 | 1970-11-30 | Szczecinek | | 1997 | Poland | M | |
| Gelashvili, Tamaz | 13600702 | 1978-04-08 | | | 1999 | Georgia | M | |
| Gelfand, Boris | 2805677 | 1968-06-24 | Minsk | | 1989 | Soviet Union | M | later Belarus; currently Israel |
| Geller, Efim | 4100581 | 1925-03-08 | Odesa | 1998-11-17 | 1952 | Russia | M | Gaige; FIDE Golden Book (Note: Di Felice gives Geller's birth date as 2 March 1925.) |
| Geller, Jakov | 4151984 | 1986-08-11 | | | 2011 | Russia | M | title application |
| Genov, Petar | 2900211 | 1970-04-05 | Plovdiv | | 2002 | Bulgaria | M | |
| Georgescu, Tiberiu-Marian | 1213300 | 1991-02-08 | Bucharest | | 2015 | Romania | M | title application |
| Georgiadis, Nico | 1300113 | 1996-01-22 | Bülach | | 2017 | Switzerland | M | title application |
| Georgiev, Kiril | 2900017 | 1965-11-28 | Petrich | | 1985 | Bulgaria | M | later North Macedonia, currently Bulgaria |
| Georgiev, Krum | 2900092 | 1958-05-24 | Pazardzhik | 2024-07-31 | 1988 | Bulgaria | M | |
| Georgiev, Vladimir | 2903024 | 1975-08-27 | Dobrich | | 2000 | Bulgaria | M | currently North Macedonia |
| Gershon, Alik | 2802430 | 1980-06-03 | Dniepropetrovsk | | 2000 | Israel | M | |
| Ghaem Maghami, Ehsan | 12500739 | 1982-08-11 | Tehran | | 2001 | Iran | M | |
| Ghane, Shojaat | 12500313 | 1975-03-30 | Ardabil | | 2008 | Iran | M | title application |
| Gharamian, Tigran | 13301527 | 1984-07-24 | Yerevan | | 2009 | France | M | title application |
| Gharibyan, Mamikon | 13308300 | 2004-09-21 | Gyumri | | 2023 | Armenia | M | title application; IM title application |
| Ghasi, Ameet K | 409200 | 1987-02-04 | | | 2024 | England | M | title application; IM title application |
| Ghazarian, Kirk | 30908604 | 2006 | | | 2024 | United States | M | title application |
| Gheorghiu, Florin | 1200011 | 1944-04-06 | Bucharest | | 1965 | Romania | M | Gaige; Di Felice |
| Ghițescu, Theodor | 1200119 | 1934-01-24 | Bucharest | 2008-11-22 | 1986 | Romania | M | honorary |
| Gholami, Aryan | 12513342 | 2001-07-26 | Sari | | 2020 | Iran | M | title application |
| Gholami Orimi, Mahdi | 12558486 | 2002 | Mazandaran province | | 2024 | Iran | M | title application |
| Ghosh, Aronyak | 25072846 | 2003-12-06 | West Bengal | | 2026 | India | M | GM title application; IM title application |
| Ghosh, Diptayan | 5045207 | 1998-08-10 | Kolkata | | 2016 | India | M | title application |
| Giaccio, Alfredo | 101613 | 1970-07-15 | Buenos Aires | | 2013 | Argentina | M | title application |
| Gines Esteo, Pedro Antonio | 32080190 | 2004-01-15 | Zaragoza | | 2022 | Spain | M | title application; IM title application |
| Ginsburg, Gennadi | 4630629 | 1971-08-11 | Kommunarsk | | 2006 | Germany | M | title application |
| Giorgadze, Giorgi Gel | 13600044 | 1964-10-10 | | | 1993 | Georgia | M | |
| Giorgadze, Tamaz | 13600028 | 1947-11-09 | Tbilisi | | 1977 | Soviet Union | M | currently Georgia |
| Gipslis, Aivars | 11600080 | 1937-02-08 | Riga | 2000-04-13 | 1967 | Soviet Union | M | later Latvia |
| Girel, Joseph | 36033561 | 2004 | | | 2024 | France | M | title application |
| Giri, Anish | 24116068 | 1994-06-28 | Saint Petersburg | | 2009 | Netherlands | M | title application |
| Girish, A. Koushik | 5038448 | 1997-08-31 | Sringeri | | 2019 | India | M | title application |
| Girya, Olga | 4195752 | 1991-06-14 | Langepas | | 2021 | Russia | F | title application |
| Gledura, Benjámin | 712779 | 1999-07-04 | | | 2016 | Hungary | M | title application |
| Gleizerov, Evgeny | 4101332 | 1963-03-20 | Chelyabinsk | | 1993 | Russia | M | |
| Glek, Igor | 4100484 | 1961-11-07 | Moscow | | 1990 | Soviet Union | M | later Germany and Russia, currently Belgium |
| Gligorić, Svetozar | 900400 | 1923-02-02 | Belgrade | 2012-08-14 | 1951 | Yugoslavia | M | Gaige; later Serbia |
| Glud, Jakob Vang | 1407767 | 1988-04-06 | Aarhus | | 2014 | Denmark | M | title application |
| Godena, Michele | 800090 | 1967-06-30 | Valdobbiadene | | 1996 | Italy | M | |
| Gofshtein, Leonid | 2801574 | 1953-04-21 | | 2015-12-25 | 1993 | Israel | M | later Zvulon Gofshtein |
| Goganov, Aleksey | 24109959 | 1991-07-26 | | | 2013 | Russia | M | title application |
| Goh, Wei Ming Kevin | 5800706 | 1983-07-07 | Singapore | | 2020 | Singapore | M | title application |
| Gökerkan, Cem Kaan | 6336760 | 2000-11-09 | | | 2023 | Turkey | M | title application; IM title application |
| Goldin, Alexander | 2019540 | 1964-02-27 | Novosibirsk | | 1989 | Soviet Union | M | later Russia, Israel; currently United States |
| Golizadeh, Asghar | 12505269 | 1990-07-29 | Tabriz | | 2011 | Iran | M | title application |
| Golod, Vitali | 2804140 | 1971-06-23 | Lviv | | 1996 | Israel | M | |
| Golombek, Harry | | 1911-03-01 | London | 1995-01-07 | 1985 | England | M | honorary |
| Goloshchapov, Alexander | 14103222 | 1978-01-25 | | | 1999 | Ukraine | M | |
| Golubev, Mikhail | 14100983 | 1970-05-30 | Odesa | | 1996 | Ukraine | M | |
| Golubka, Petro | 14114224 | 1989-05-09 | | | 2020 | Ukraine | M | title application; IM title application; currently Canada |
| Gomez Esteban, Juan Mario | 2200163 | 1958-02-15 | Santurce | | 2004 | Spain | M | title application (Note: Gomez Esteban's GM title application lists his birthday as 5 February 1958, but Di Felice and other sources have 15 February.) |
| Gomez Garrido, Camilo Ernesto | 3507904 | 1987-10-23 | Holguín | | 2016 | Cuba | M | title application |
| Gómez, John Paul | 5201381 | 1986-05-23 | | | 2009 | Philippines | M | title application |
| Gonda, László | 720852 | 1988-04-24 | Tatabánya | | 2010 | Hungary | M | title application |
| Gonzáles, Jayson | 5201080 | 1969-02-05 | Quezon City | | 2008 | Philippines | M | |
| González, Renier | 3501841 | 1972-11-21 | Jagüey Grande | | 2008 | United States | M | title application |
| González Acosta, Bernal | 6500170 | 1973-06-10 | San José, Costa Rica | | 2015 | Costa Rica | M | title application |
| González García, José | 5101174 | 1973-08-12 | Madrid | | 2006 | Mexico | M | title application; currently Spain |
| González Vidal, Yuri | 3503321 | 1981-01-12 | Marianao | | 2009 | Cuba | M | title application (Note: Di Felice gives 2008 as the title year for González Vidal, but the FIDE Profile page and the FIDE Golden Book have 2009.) |
| Gonzalez Zamora, Juan Carlos | 3507548 | 1968-06-24 | Havana | | 2004 | Mexico | M | |
| González Pérez, Arian | 3507777 | 1988-08-17 | Santa Clara, Cuba | | 2018 | FIDE | M | title application; currently Spain |
| Gopal, G. N. | 5015693 | 1989-03-29 | Muvattupuzha | | 2007 | India | M | title application |
| Gordievsky, Dmitry | 24112798 | 1996-04-24 | Moscow | | 2017 | Russia | M | title application (Note: Gordievsky's date and place of birth are from Di Felice.) |
| Gordon, Stephen J. | 411477 | 1986-09-04 | Oldham | | 2009 | England | M | title application |
| Gormally, Daniel W. | 406465 | 1976-05-04 | Hertfordshire | | 2005 | England | M | title application |
| Gorovets, Andrey | 13504037 | 1987-09-14 | Vitebsk | | 2017 | Belarus | M | title application |
| Gorovykh, Eduard | 4176847 | 1990-02-07 | Krasnodar | | 2012 | Russia | M | title application |
| Gorshtein, Ido | 2815532 | 2002-04-13 | | | 2023 | Israel | M | title application |
| Goryachkina, Aleksandra | 4147103 | 1998-09-28 | Orsk | | 2018 | Russia | F | title application |
| Gozzoli, Yannick | 616915 | 1983-06-02 | Marseille | | 2012 | France | M | title application |
| Grabarczyk, Mirosław | 1101684 | 1971-01-03 | Płock | | 2002 | Poland | M | |
| Grachev, Boris | 4129199 | 1986-03-27 | Moscow | | 2007 | Russia | M | title application |
| Graf, Alexander | 4680804 | 1962-08-25 | Tashkent | | 1992 | Uzbekistan | M | born Alexander Nenashev; currently Germany |
| Granda Zúñiga, Julio E | 3800024 | 1967-02-25 | Camaná | | 1986 | Peru | M | |
| Grandelius, Nils | 1710400 | 1993-06-03 | Lund | | 2010 | Sweden | M | title application |
| Grebnev, Aleksey | 34189030 | 2006-07-26 | Tolyatti | | 2024 | Russia | M | title application |
| Grechikhin, Valery | 4121015 | 1937-09-06 | | 2008-05-13 | 1998 | Russia | M | |
| Greenfeld, Alon | 2800039 | 1964-04-17 | New York City | | 1989 | Israel | M | |
| Grétarsson, Helgi Áss | 2300699 | 1977-02-18 | | | 1994 | Iceland | M | |
| Grétarsson, Hjörvar Steinn | 2302241 | 1993-05-29 | Reykjavík | | 2013 | Iceland | M | title application |
| Grieve, Harry | 426520 | 2001 | | | 2026 | England | M | GM title application |
| Grigore, George-Gabriel | 1200186 | 1970-11-13 | Constanța | | 2002 | Romania | M | |
| Grigoriants, Sergey | 4130804 | 1983-11-02 | Tashkent | | 2003 | Russia | M | now Hungary |
| Grigorov, Grigor | 2907313 | 1987-05-26 | Petrich | | 2011 | Bulgaria | M | title application |
| Grigoryan, Avetik | 13302191 | 1989-01-27 | Yerevan | | 2008 | Armenia | M | IM title application; title application |
| Grigoryan, Karen H. | 13301004 | 1995-02-25 | Yerevan | | 2013 | Armenia | M | title application |
| Grischuk, Alexander | 4126025 | 1983-10-31 | Moscow | | 2000 | Russia | M | |
| Gritsak, Orest | 14102188 | 1973-02-24 | Lviv | | 2001 | Ukraine | M | |
| Grivas, Efstratios | 4200039 | 1966-03-30 | Aigio | | 1993 | Greece | M | |
| Groszpeter, Attila | 700053 | 1960-06-09 | Hódmezővásárhely | | 1986 | Hungary | M | |
| Grover, Sahaj | 5021103 | 1995-09-07 | Delhi | | 2012 | India | M | title application |
| Gruenfeld, Yehuda | 2800020 | 1956-02-28 | Dzierżoniów | | 1980 | Israel | M | |
| Grünfeld, Ernst | | 1893-11-21 | Vienna | 1962-04-03 | 1950 | Austria | M | Gaige; Di Felice |
| Guerra Mendez, Jose Angel | 3508129 | 1988-01-20 | Manzanillo, Cuba | | 2017 | Spain | M | title application |
| Gufeld, Eduard | 2015307 | 1936-03-19 | Kyiv | 2002-09-23 | 1967 | Ukraine | M | later United States |
| Guidarelli, Laurent | 611123 | 1981-06-18 | Carpentras | | 2014 | France | M | title application |
| Guimard, Carlos | 100650 | 1913-04-06 | Santiago del Estero | 1998-09-11 | 1960 | Argentina | M | |
| Gujrathi, Vidit | 5029465 | 1994-10-24 | Nashik | | 2013 | India | M | title application |
| Gukesh D | 46616543 | 2006-05-29 | Chennai | | 2019 | India | M | title application |
| Guliev, Sarhan | 13400231 | 1968-04-01 | | | 1995 | Azerbaijan | M | |
| Guliyev, Namig | 13400363 | 1974-02-13 | Beylagan | | 2005 | Azerbaijan | M | title application |
| Gulko, Boris | 2000040 | 1947-02-09 | Erfurt | | 1976 | Soviet Union | M | currently United States |
| Gumularz, Szymon | 1188062 | 2001-12-22 | Myślenice | | 2021 | Poland | M | title application; IM title application |
| Gunawan, Ruben | 7100248 | 1968-04-17 | Jakarta | 2005-08-28 | 1999 | Indonesia | M | |
| Gundavaa, Bayarsaikhan | 4901045 | 1989-05-29 | | | 2013 | Mongolia | M | title application |
| Gunina, Valentina | 4167570 | 1989-02-04 | Murmansk | | 2013 | Russia | F | title application |
| Guo, Arthur | 30903114 | 2006-05-19 | | | 2023 | United States | M | title application |
| Gupta, Abhijeet | 5010608 | 1989-10-16 | Bhilwara | | 2008 | India | M | title application |
| Gupta, Prithu | 46618546 | 2004-03-08 | Delhi | | 2019 | India | M | title application |
| Gupta, Sankalp | 5097010 | 2003-08-18 | Nagpur | | 2022 | India | M | title application; IM title application |
| Gürel, Ediz | 44507356 | 2008-12-05 | | | 2024 | Turkey | M | title application |
| Gurevich, Dmitry | 2000407 | 1956-09-11 | Moscow | | 1983 | United States | M | |
| Gurevich, Ilya | 2000628 | 1972-02-08 | Kyiv | | 1993 | United States | M | (Note: Di Felice and Gaige list Gurevich's birthday as 6 February 1972, but the FIDE Golden Book and other sources have 8 February.) |
| Gurevich, Mikhail | 200930 | 1959-02-22 | Kharkiv | | 1986 | Soviet Union | M | later Turkey; currently Belgium |
| Gurevich, Vladimir | 14100207 | 1959-08-04 | | | 1998 | Ukraine | M | currently Germany |
| Gurgenidze, Bukhuti | 13600184 | 1933-11-13 | Surami | 2008-05-24 | 1970 | Soviet Union | M | later Georgia |
| Guseinov, Aidyn | 13400169 | 1955-11-30 | | 2003-10-30 | 1998 | Azerbaijan | M | |
| Guseinov, Gadir | 13401378 | 1986-05-21 | Moscow | | 2002 | Azerbaijan | M | |
| Gustafsson, Jan | 4625498 | 1979-06-25 | Hamburg | | 2003 | Germany | M | |
| Gutman, Gennadi | 14102277 | 1973-11-01 | | | 2001 | Ukraine | M | |
| Gutman, Lev | 4600177 | 1945-09-26 | Riga | | 1986 | Israel | M | currently Germany |
| Gutov, Andrey | 4130480 | 1978-12-08 | Belovo | | 2006 | Russia | M | |
| Gyimesi, Zoltán | 702218 | 1977-03-31 | | | 1996 | Hungary | M | |
| Hába, Petr | 300160 | 1965-01-06 | Zlín | | 1997 | Czech Republic | M | |
| Haddouche, Mohamed | 7900660 | 1984-08-19 | Sidi Bel Abbès | | 2014 | Algeria | M | title application |
| Hakobyan, Aram | 13306677 | 2001-04-01 | Yerevan | | 2018 | Armenia | M | title application |
| Halkias, Stelios | 4201809 | 1980-04-11 | | | 2002 | Greece | M | |
| Hambleton, Aman | 2606577 | 1992-12-30 | Halifax | | 2018 | Canada | M | title application |
| Hamdouchi, Hicham | 9000011 | 1972-10-08 | Tangier | | 1994 | Morocco | M | later France; currently Morocco |
| Hamițevici, Vladimir | 13902393 | 1991-02-19 | Bender, Moldova | | 2017 | Moldova | M | title application |
| Hammer, Jon Ludvig | 1503707 | 1990-06-02 | Bergen | | 2009 | Norway | M | title application |
| Handke, Florian | 4634527 | 1982-03-22 | | | 2003 | Germany | M | title application |
| Handoko, Edhi | 7100043 | 1960-08-28 | Surakarta | 2009-02-17 | 1994 | Indonesia | M | |
| Hansen, Curt | 1400010 | 1964-09-18 | Bov Municipality | | 1985 | Denmark | M | |
| Hansen, Eric | 2606771 | 1992-05-24 | Irvine, California | | 2013 | Canada | M | title application |
| Hansen, Lars Bo | 1400037 | 1968-09-24 | | | 1990 | Denmark | M | |
| Hansen, Sune Berg | 1400266 | 1971-04-21 | | | 1998 | Denmark | M | |
| Hansen, Torbjørn Ringdal | 1501720 | 1979-03-01 | Lørenskog | | 2015 | Norway | M | title application |
| Hardaway, Brewington | 30941849 | 2009 | | | 2025 | United States | M | title application |
| Har-Zvi, Ronen | 2801485 | 1976-10-13 | | | 1995 | Israel | M | |
| Haria, Ravi | 415820 | 1999-02-07 | Elstree | | 2022 | England | M | title application; IM title application |
| Harikrishna, Pentala | 5007003 | 1986-05-10 | Guntur | | 2001 | India | M | |
| Harikrishnan A. Ra. | 5081483 | 2001-09-21 | Chennai | | 2025 | India | M | GM title application; IM title application |
| Haring, Filip | 14933080 | 2003 | | | 2025 | Slovakia | M | title application |
| Harshavardhan G B | 25059009 | 2003-11-15 | Kumbakonam | | 2026 | India | M | GM title application; IM title application |
| Harutjunyan, Gevorg | 13300873 | 1981-05-07 | Yerevan | | 2009 | Armenia | M | title application (Note: Harutjunyan's GM title application seems to show a date of birth of 5 July 1981, but Di Felice and other sources have 7 May.) |
| Harutyunyan, Tigran K. | 13303635 | 1997-01-15 | Yerevan | | 2019 | Armenia | M | title application |
| Hasangatin, Ramil | 4122160 | 1972-07-01 | Kazan | | 2003 | Russia | M | title application |
| Haslinger, Stewart G. | 405248 | 1981-11-25 | Ainsdale | | 2007 | England | M | title application |
| Haub, Thorsten Michael | 4610776 | 1968-02-15 | Siegen | | 2015 | Germany | M | title application |
| Hauchard, Arnaud | 600113 | 1971-11-15 | Rouen | | 2000 | France | M | |
| Hauge, Lars Oskar | 1509276 | 1998-11-17 | Oslo | | 2022 | Norway | M | title application; IM title application |
| Hausrath, Daniel | 4617495 | 1976-04-08 | Mülheim, Cologne | | 2013 | Germany | M | title application |
| Hawkins, Jonathan | 412686 | 1983-05-01 | Consett | 2025-12-22 | 2014 | England | M | title application |
| Hayrapetyan, Hovik | 13302639 | 1990-02-15 | Stepanakert | | 2013 | Armenia | M | title application |
| Haznedaroğlu, Kıvanç | 6300634 | 1981-01-01 | Ankara | | 2009 | Turkey | M | title application |
| Hebden, Mark L. | 400084 | 1958-02-15 | Leicester | | 1992 | England | M | |
| Heberla, Bartłomiej | 1115120 | 1985-06-19 | Rybnik | | 2006 | Poland | M | title application |
| Hecht, Hans-Joachim | 4600320 | 1939-01-29 | Luckenwalde | | 1973 | Germany | M | |
| Hector, Jonny | 1700090 | 1964-02-13 | Malmö | | 1991 | Sweden | M | |
| Heinemann, Thies | 4601556 | 1971-03-07 | Hamburg | | 2018 | Germany | M | title application |
| Heimann, Andreas | 24624632 | 1992-01-10 | Rheinfelden | | 2016 | Germany | M | title application |
| Heimann, Mark | 2028441 | 1993-01-25 | | | 2025 | United States | M | title application |
| Hellers, Ferdinand | 1700022 | 1969-01-28 | Stockholm | | 1988 | Sweden | M | |
| Hellsten, Johan | 1702092 | 1975-12-25 | Malmö | | 2004 | Sweden | M | title application |
| Henderson de La Fuente, Lance | 32096585 | 2003-05-19 | Marbella | | 2019 | Spain | M | title application; currently Andorra |
| Henley, Ron | 2000318 | 1956-12-05 | Houston | | 1982 | United States | M | |
| Henriquez Villagra, Cristóbal | 3409350 | 1996-08-07 | Santiago | | 2017 | Chile | M | title application |
| Héra, Imre Jr. | 716855 | 1986-09-03 | Budapest | | 2007 | Hungary | M | title application |
| Hernández Carmenate, Holden | 3504387 | 1984-08-10 | Güines | | 2007 | Cuba | M | title application; currently United States |
| Hernández Guerrero, Gilberto | 5100011 | 1970-02-04 | Ébano | | 1995 | Mexico | M | |
| Hernández Onna, Román | 3500063 | 1949-11-23 | Santiago de Cuba | 2021-06-01 | 1978 | Cuba | M | |
| Herraiz Hidálgo, Herminio | 2205009 | 1978-10-30 | Las Pedroñeras | | 2009 | Spain | M | title application |
| Herrera, Irisberto | 3500373 | 1968-12-07 | | | 1999 | Cuba | M | currently Spain |
| Hertneck, Gerald | 4600088 | 1963-09-18 | Munich | | 1991 | Germany | M | |
| Hesham, Abdelrahman | 10600183 | 1992-02-12 | | | 2016 | Egypt | M | winner 2016 African Individual Chess Championships |
| Hess, Robert | 2022036 | 1991-12-19 | New York City | | 2009 | United States | M | title application |
| Hevia Alejano, Carlos Antonio | 3508811 | 1991-10-30 | Havana | | 2015 | Cuba | M | title application |
| Hickl, Jörg | 4600118 | 1965-04-16 | Wiesbaden | | 1988 | Germany | M | |
| Hillarp Persson, Tiger | 1700812 | 1970-10-28 | Malmö | | 1999 | Sweden | M | |
| Himanshu, Sharma | 5007836 | 1983-09-16 | Rohtak | | 2017 | India | M | title application |
| Hjartarson, Jóhann | 2300044 | 1963-02-08 | Reykjavík | | 1985 | Iceland | M | |
| Hoàng Thanh Trang | 12400149 | 1980-04-25 | Hanoi | | 2007 | Hungary | F | title application |
| Hodgson, Julian M. | 400076 | 1963-07-25 | London | | 1988 | England | M | |
| Hoffman, Alejandro | 100340 | 1966-10-26 | Buenos Aires | | 1998 | Argentina | M | later Uruguay |
| Hoffmann, Michael | 4601297 | 1970-09-19 | Bochum | | 2009 | Germany | M | |
| Høi, Carsten | 1400100 | 1957-01-16 | Copenhagen | | 2001 | Denmark | M | |
| Holt, Conrad | 2034387 | 1993-07-09 | Wichita | | 2012 | United States | M | title application |
| Holm, Kristian Stuvik | 1508083 | 1998-02-16 | | | 2025 | Norway | M | title application; IM title application |
| Holzke, Frank | 4600428 | 1971-07-08 | Cologne | | 2008 | Germany | M | title application |
| Honfi, Károly | | 1930-10-25 | Pesterzsébet | 1996-08-14 | 1996 | Hungary | M | honorary |
| Hong, Andrew | 2099438 | 2004-11-23 | San Jose, California | | 2021 | United States | M | title application; IM title application |
| Hort, Vlastimil | 4600029 | 1944-01-12 | Kladno | 2025-05-12 | 1965 | Czechoslovakia | M | later West Germany and Germany |
| Horváth, Ádám | 708003 | 1981-07-14 | | | 2002 | Hungary | M | |
| Horvath, Csaba | 700118 | 1968-06-05 | | | 1993 | Hungary | M | |
| Horvath, Dominik | 1642561 | 2003-08-29 | | | 2024 | Austria | M | title application |
| Horvath, Jozsef | 700061 | 1964-08-13 | Budapest | | 1990 | Hungary | M | |
| Horváth, Péter | 700843 | 1972-06-17 | Pécs | | 2006 | Hungary | M | title application |
| Hossain, Enamul | 10200649 | 1981-09-30 | Dhaka | | 2008 | Bangladesh | M | title application |
| Hou Yifan | 8602980 | 1994-02-27 | Xinghua | | 2008 | China | F | title application |
| Hovhannisyan, Mher | 13300865 | 1978-09-25 | Gyumri | | 2018 | Belgium | M | title application |
| Hovhannisyan, Robert | 13302507 | 1991-03-23 | Yerevan | | 2010 | Armenia | M | title application |
| Howell, David W. L. | 410608 | 1990-11-14 | Eastbourne | | 2007 | England | M | title application |
| Howell, James C. | 400297 | 1967-05-17 | Brent | | 1995 | England | M | |
| Hráček, Zbyněk | 300071 | 1970-09-09 | Uherské Hradiště | | 1993 | Czech Republic | M | |
| Hübner, Robert | 4600010 | 1948-11-06 | Cologne | 2025-01-05 | 1971 | West Germany | M | Gaige; (Note: Di Felice lists Hübner's title year as 1970, but Gaige and the FIDE Golden Book show the title was awarded in 1971.) later Germany |
| Huerga Leache, Mikel | 2268795 | 1989-12-22 | Pamplona | | 2022 | Spain | M | title application; Di Felice |
| Hulak, Krunoslav | 14500060 | 1951-05-25 | Osijek | 2015-10-23 | 1976 | Yugoslavia | M | later Croatia |
| Hungaski, Robert | 2021030 | 1987-12-08 | Stamford, Connecticut | | 2013 | United States | M | title application |
| Huschenbeth, Niclas | 24604747 | 1992-02-29 | Hann. Münden | | 2012 | Germany | M | title application |
| Huzman, Alexander | 2803828 | 1962-04-10 | Zhytomyr | | 1991 | Israel | M | |
| Ibarra Chami, Luís Fernando | 5105048 | 1989-05-15 | Mérida, Yucatán | | 2020 | Mexico | M | title application |
| Ibarra Jeréz, José Carlos | 2226332 | 1985-08-07 | Murcia | | 2013 | Spain | M | title application |
| Ibragimov, Alibek | 13700952 | 1968-08-12 | | | 2002 | Kazakhstan | M | |
| Ibragimov, Ildar | 4102878 | 1967-08-16 | Kazan | | 1993 | Russia | M | later United States; currently Russia |
| Ibrahimov, Rasul | 13400495 | 1981-08-13 | Baku | | 2005 | Azerbaijan | M | title application |
| Ibrayev, Nurlan | 13700650 | 1977-02-25 | Tselinograd | | 2005 | Kazakhstan | M | title application |
| Idani, Pouya | 12510130 | 1995-09-22 | Ahvaz | | 2014 | Iran | M | title application; currently France |
| Ikonnikov, Vyacheslav | 4100972 | 1966-03-15 | | | 1999 | Russia | M | |
| Ilamparthi A R | 45015775 | 2009-03-28 | Pollachi | | 2026 | India | M | GM title application; IM title application |
| Ilinca, Felix-Antonio | 54764998 | 2010 | | | 2026 | Romania | M | GM title application |
| Ilinčić, Zlatko | 900346 | 1968-05-10 | | | 1994 | Yugoslavia (S&M) | M | currently Serbia |
| Iljin, Artem | 4156021 | 1987-01-04 | Tatarstan | | 2007 | Russia | M | title application; currently Montenegro |
| Iljiushenok, Ilia | 24105074 | 1993-08-16 | Langepas | | 2018 | Russia | M | title application |
| Iljushin, Alexei | 4122178 | 1980-07-29 | | | 2001 | Russia | M | |
| Illescas Cordoba, Miguel | 2200015 | 1965-12-03 | Barcelona | | 1988 | Spain | M | |
| Illingworth, Max | 3205207 | 1992-11-05 | Sydney | | 2016 | Australia | M | title application |
| Inarkiev, Ernesto | 4162722 | 1985-12-09 | Osh | | 2002 | Russia | M | |
| Indjić, Aleksandar | 911925 | 1995-08-24 | Stara Pazova | | 2013 | Serbia | M | title application |
| Iniyan P. | 25002767 | 2002-09-13 | Erode | | 2019 | India | M | title application |
| Inkiov, Ventzislav | 2900033 | 1956-05-19 | Stanke Dimitrov | | 1982 | Bulgaria | M | |
| Ioannidis, Evgenios | 4229274 | 2001-01-12 | | | 2023 | Greece | M | title application |
| Ionescu, Constantin | 1200089 | 1958-09-12 | Brașov | 2024-07-31 | 1998 | Romania | M | |
| Ionov, Sergey | 4100875 | 1962-01-07 | | | 1996 | Russia | M | |
| Iordăchescu, Viorel | 13900200 | 1977-04-20 | Kishinev | | 1999 | Moldova | M | |
| Iotov, Valentin | 2906074 | 1988-09-06 | Pleven | | 2008 | Bulgaria | M | title application |
| Ipatov, Alexander | 14116731 | 1993-07-16 | Lviv | | 2011 | Spain | M | title application; currently Turkey |
| Irzhanov, Ruslan | 13700154 | 1976-11-27 | | | 1997 | Kazakhstan | M | |
| Iskandarov, Misratdin | 13400312 | 1995-01-14 | Sumgait | | 2020 | Azerbaijan | M | title application |
| Iskusnyh, Sergei | 4120027 | 1974-09-05 | | | 2000 | Russia | M | |
| Ismagambetov, Anuar | 13701525 | 1986-03-21 | Astana | | 2008 | Kazakhstan | M | title application |
| Istrățescu, Andrei | 1200372 | 1975-12-03 | Bucharest | | 1994 | Romania | M | (Note: Di Felice lists 1993 as Istrățescu's title year, but the FIDE Chess Profile page and the FIDE Golden Book have 1994.) later France; currently Romania |
| Iturrizaga Bonelli, Eduardo | 3901211 | 1989-11-01 | Caracas | | 2008 | Venezuela | M | title application; currently Spain |
| Iuldachev, Saidali | 14200104 | 1968-01-31 | | | 1996 | Uzbekistan | M | |
| Ivanchuk, Vasyl | 14100010 | 1969-03-18 | Kopychyntsi | | 1988 | Soviet Union | M | currently Ukraine |
| Ivanišević, Ivan | 912417 | 1977-11-23 | Belgrade | | 2000 | Yugoslavia (S&M) | M | currently Serbia |
| Ivanov, Alexander | 2000202 | 1956-05-01 | Novovarshavka | | 1991 | United States | M | |
| Ivanov, Alexander A. | 4126360 | 1965-01-19 | Arkhangelsk | | 2008 | Russia | M | title application |
| Ivanov, Igor Vasilyevich | 2000288 | 1947-01-08 | Leningrad | 2005-11-17 | 2005 | Canada | M | Di Felice (Note: "he got the GM title in 2005 for norms that he made in the early 1990s and was unaware of" –"Igor Ivanov – Grandmaster and pianist", Chessbase News, 3 January 2006) |
| Ivanov, Mikhail M. | 4114906 | 1969-01-20 | | | 1993 | Russia | M | (Note: Di Felice lists Mikhail Ivanov's birth date as 20 Jan 1969, but old FIDE rating lists have 10 Jan. The FIDE Golden Book confirms that Ivanov was awarded the GM title in 1993, but it does not list a birth date.) currently Serbia |
| Ivanov, Sergey | 4101375 | 1961-09-29 | Leningrad | | 1995 | Russia | M | |
| Ivanović, Božidar | 900095 | 1946-08-24 | Cetinje | | 1978 | Yugoslavia | M | (Note: Di Felice lists 1977 as Božidar Ivanović's GM title year, but his FIDE Chess Profile page and the FIDE Golden Book have 1978. Di Felice lists Božidar's birth year as 1949 which is what FIDE records said at time the book was published, but FIDE subsequently changed the birth year to 1946.) currently Montenegro |
| Ivić, Velimir | 950122 | 2002-08-27 | Belgrade | | 2020 | Serbia | M | title application |
| Ivkov, Borislav | 900141 | 1933-11-12 | Belgrade | 2022-02-14 | 1955 | Yugoslavia | M | Gaige; later Serbia |
| Izeta Txabarri, Félix | 2200260 | 1961-08-03 | Zestoa | | 1994 | Spain | M | currently Senegal |
| Izmukhambetov, Salauat | 13700545 | 1972 | | | 1996 | Kazakhstan | M | |
| Izoria, Zviad | 13601733 | 1984-01-06 | Khoni | | 2002 | Georgia | M | FIDE Golden Book; currently United States |
| Jacimović, Dragoljub | 15000214 | 1964-01-10 | | | 2001 | North Macedonia | M | |
| Jacobson, Brandon | 30901561 | 2003-11-14 | Plainfield, New Jersey | | 2020 | United States | M | title application |
| Jakovenko, Dmitry | 4122356 | 1983-06-28 | Omsk | | 2001 | Russia | M | |
| Jakubiec, Artur | 1103261 | 1973-12-03 | Wadowice | | 2002 | Poland | M | |
| Jakubowski, Krzysztof | 1112848 | 1983-09-23 | Łomża | | 2009 | Poland | M | title application |
| Janev, Evgeni | 2900360 | 1973-05-16 | Sofia | | 2002 | Bulgaria | M | |
| Janik, Igor | 1159259 | 2000-06-09 | Elbląg | | 2022 | Poland | M | title application |
| Janjghava, Lasha | 13600087 | 1970-05-05 | | | 1990 | Soviet Union | M | also Dzandzhgava; currently Georgia |
| Janković, Alojzije | 14505959 | 1983-04-02 | Zagreb | | 2006 | Croatia | M | title application |
| Janošević, Dragoljub | | 1923-07-08 | Belgrade | 1993-05-20 | 1965 | Yugoslavia | M | |
| Janovsky, Sergey | 4102711 | 1960-02-17 | | | 1995 | Russia | M | |
| Jansa, Vlastimil | 300128 | 1942-11-27 | Prague | | 1974 | Czechoslovakia | M | currently Czech Republic |
| Janssen, Ruud | 1004816 | 1979-05-01 | Venray | | 2011 | Netherlands | M | title application |
| Jaracz, Paweł | 1102222 | 1975-07-22 | Kożuchów | | 2000 | Poland | M | |
| Jarmuła, Łukasz | 1160664 | 1998-11-10 | Warsaw | | 2021 | Poland | M | title application |
| Jayaram, Ashwin | 5018137 | 1990-08-14 | Aluva | | 2015 | India | M | title application |
| Jedynak, Radosław | 1109243 | 1982-06-09 | Warsaw | | 2006 | Poland | M | title application |
| Jenni, Florian | 1304232 | 1980-03-24 | Lieli | | 2002 | Switzerland | M | |
| Jeremić, Veljko | 927040 | 1985-11-09 | Priboj | | 2004 | Serbia and Montenegro | M | title application; currently Serbia |
| Jianu, Vlad-Cristian | 1208110 | 1984-09-27 | Bucharest | | 2007 | Romania | M | title application |
| Jirovský, Miloš | 303224 | 1974-03-17 | Kolin | | 2003 | Czech Republic | M | |
| Jobava, Baadur | 13601520 | 1983-11-26 | Gali | | 2001 | Georgia | M | |
| Johannessen, Leif Erlend | 1501674 | 1980-04-14 | Oslo | | 2002 | Norway | M | |
| Johansen, Darryl K. | 3200035 | 1959-02-04 | Melbourne | | 1995 | Australia | M | |
| Jojua, Davit | 13602543 | 1989-06-08 | Samtredia | | 2009 | Georgia | M | title application |
| Jonkman, Harmen | 1002708 | 1975-05-30 | Beverwijk | | 2002 | Netherlands | M | |
| Jovanić, Ognjen | 14504081 | 1978-05-04 | | | 2007 | Croatia | M | title application |
| Jovanović, Zoran | 14505320 | 1979-06-07 | | | 2006 | Croatia | M | |
| Ju Wenjun | 8603006 | 1991-01-31 | Shanghai | | 2014 | China | F | title application |
| Jumabayev, Rinat | 13702661 | 1989-07-23 | Shymkent | | 2009 | Kazakhstan | M | title application |
| Jurčík, Marián | 14907518 | 1987-01-27 | | | 2017 | Slovakia | M | title application |
| Jussupow, Artur | 4618777 | 1960-02-13 | Moscow | | 1980 | Soviet Union | M | previously Artur Yusupov; currently Germany |
| Kabanov, Nikolai | 4127820 | 1980-01-22 | | | 2009 | Russia | M | title application |
| Kacharava, Nikolozi | 13611860 | 2004-03-03 | | | 2023 | Georgia | M | title application; IM title application |
| Kacheishvili, Giorgi | 13600613 | 1977-02-10 | | | 1997 | Georgia | M | currently United States |
| Kadrić, Denis | 14403803 | 1995-06-12 | Frankfurt | | 2015 | Bosnia and Herzegovina | M | title application; currently Montenegro |
| Kaidanov, Gregory | 2008564 | 1959-10-11 | Berdychiv | | 1988 | Soviet Union | M | later Ukraine; currently United States |
| Kalinin, Alexander | 4112423 | 1968-05-26 | | | 2001 | Russia | M | |
| Kalinitschew, Sergey | 4637321 | 1956-02-03 | Moscow | | 1997 | Germany | M | |
| Kállai, Gábor | 700282 | 1959-02-21 | Budapest | 2021-12-31 | 1995 | Hungary | M | |
| Kallio, Heikki | 501778 | 1980-10-15 | Vaasa | | 2001 | Finland | M | |
| Kalod, Radek | 305421 | 1978-08-08 | Brno | | 2004 | Czech Republic | M | title application |
| Kalugin, Sergey G. | 4128567 | 1970-10-03 | | | 2000 | Russia | M | |
| Kalyan, Arjun | 35018701 | 2002-06-17 | Chennai | | 2021 | India | M | title application; IM title application |
| Kamiński, Marcin | 1100696 | 1977-03-10 | Wrocław | | 1996 | Poland | M | |
| Kamsky, Gata | 2000024 | 1974-06-02 | Novokuznetsk | | 1990 | United States | M | currently France |
| Kannappan Priyadharshan | 5018293 | 1993-12-01 | Madurai | | 2016 | India | M | title application |
| Kanarek, Marcel | 1126822 | 1993-02-05 | Koszalin | | 2016 | Poland | M | title application |
| Kandil, Adham | 10618490 | 2001 | | | 2025 | Egypt | M | winner 2025 Arab Chess Championship |
| Kanep, Meelis | 4501047 | 1983-05-27 | Võru | | 2006 | Estonia | M | |
| Kantāns, Toms | 11602945 | 1994-01-16 | Riga | | 2017 | Latvia | M | title application |
| Kántor, Gergely | 751499 | 1999-07-19 | | | 2019 | Hungary | M | title application |
| Kantsler, Boris | 2805359 | 1962-04-16 | Frunze | | 1999 | Israel | M | |
| Kapnisis, Spyridon | 4203445 | 1981-05-11 | | | 2011 | Greece | M | title application |
| Karjakin, Sergey | 14109603 | 1990-01-12 | Simferopol | | 2003 | Ukraine | M | currently Russia |
| Karlsson, Lars | 1700057 | 1955-07-11 | Stockholm | | 1982 | Sweden | M | |
| Karpatchev, Aleksandr | 4117182 | 1967-05-25 | | | 1997 | Russia | M | |
| Karpov, Anatoly | 4100026 | 1951-05-23 | Zlatoust | | 1970 | Soviet Union | M | Gaige; currently Russia |
| Karthikeyan P. | 5018226 | 1990-06-14 | Chennai | | 2019 | India | M | title application |
| Kashdan, Isaac | | 1905-11-19 | New York City | 1985-02-20 | 1954 | United States | M | Gaige |
| Kasimdzhanov, Rustam | 14200244 | 1979-12-05 | Tashkent | | 1997 | Uzbekistan | M | |
| Kasparov, Garry | 4100018 | 1963-04-13 | Baku | | 1980 | Soviet Union | M | currently Russia |
| Kasparov, Sergey | 13500481 | 1968-08-08 | Mogilev | | 2007 | Belarus | M | title application |
| Kaufman, Lawrence | 2000555 | 1947-11-15 | Washington | | 2008 | United States | M | winner 2008 World Senior Chess Championship |
| Kavalek, Lubomir | 2000121 | 1943-08-09 | Prague | 2021-01-18 | 1966 | United States | M | (Note: Gaige lists Kavalek's title year as 1965.) |
| Kayumov, Dmitry D. | 14200090 | 1949-02-28 | Tashkent | 2021-07-28 | 2003 | Uzbekistan | M | title application |
| Kayumov, Sergey | 14200880 | 1981-08-08 | Tashkent | | 2010 | Uzbekistan | M | title application |
| Kazakouski, Valery | 13507443 | 2000-07-14 | Minsk | | 2022 | Lithuania | M | title application; IM title application |
| Kazakov, Mikhail | 14102749 | 1972-05-28 | | | 2001 | Ukraine | M | also Mikhail Kozakov |
| Kazhgaleyev, Murtas | 13700316 | 1973-11-17 | Uralsk | | 1998 | Kazakhstan | M | |
| Keene, Raymond D. | 400211 | 1948-01-29 | London | | 1976 | England | M | |
| Keitlinghaus, Ludger | 4600479 | 1965-07-24 | | | 1998 | Germany | M | |
| Kekelidze, Mikheil | 13600818 | 1974-09-14 | | | 2000 | Georgia | M | |
| Kelires, Andreas | 5900727 | 1999-07-01 | Cyprus | | 2016 | Greece | M | title application; currently Cyprus |
| Kevlishvili, Robby | 1040634 | 2001-04-15 | Dronten | | 2021 | Netherlands | M | title application; IM title application |
| Keymer, Vincent | 12940690 | 2004-11-15 | Mainz | | 2020 | Germany | M | title application |
| Kempiński, Robert | 1105663 | 1977-07-11 | Gdańsk | | 1996 | Poland | M | |
| Ķeņģis, Edvīns | 11600039 | 1959-04-12 | Cēsis | | 1991 | Latvia | M | |
| Keres, Paul | | 1916-01-07 | Helsinki | 1975-06-05 | 1950 | Soviet Union | M | Gaige; Di Felice |
| Khachiyan, Melikset | 13300512 | 1970-07-06 | Baku | | 2006 | United States | M | (Note: Di Felice gives Kachiyan's title year as 2005, but FIDE rating lists show him as an IM until the July 2006 list.) |
| Khairullin, Ildar | 4151348 | 1990-08-22 | Perm | | 2007 | Russia | M | title application |
| Khalifman, Alexander | 4100115 | 1966-01-18 | Leningrad | | 1990 | Russia | M | later Germany; currently Russia |
| Khamrakulov, Djurabek | 14201143 | 1988-07-12 | Samarkand | | 2018 | Uzbekistan | M | title application |
| Khamrakulov, Ibragim S. | 14200295 | 1982-07-28 | | | 2006 | Spain | M | |
| Khan, Sultan | | 1903 | Mitha Tiwana | 1966-04-25 | 2024 | Pakistan | M | honorary |
| Khanin, Semen | 4111990 | 1999-05-23 | Novosibirsk | | 2023 | Russia | M | title application; IM title application |
| Kharchenko, Boris | 14113210 | 1991-07-15 | Luhansk | | 2013 | Ukraine | M | title application |
| Kharitonov, Alexandr | 4135202 | 1986-11-08 | Obninsk | | 2006 | Russia | M | title application |
| Kharitonov, Andrei | 4100948 | 1959-04-04 | Moscow | 2012-01-13 | 1993 | Russia | M | |
| Kharlov, Andrei | 4102185 | 1968-11-20 | Prokopyevsk | 2014-06-15 | 1992 | Russia | M | |
| Khasin, Alexander | 4101189 | 1951-04-29 | Novosibirsk | 2016-12-31 | 1996 | Russia | M | |
| Khatanbaatar, Bazar | 4900332 | 1973-02-25 | | | 1999 | Mongolia | M | |
| Khegay, Dmitriy | 24153729 | 1997-07-21 | | | 2020 | Russia | M | title application |
| Khenkin, Igor | 4659600 | 1968-03-21 | Vladimir, Russia | | 1992 | Russia | M | later Israel; currently Germany |
| Khismatullin, Denis | 4142578 | 1984-12-28 | Neftekamsk | | 2004 | Russia | M | |
| Khmelniker, Ilya | 2805340 | 1985-09-21 | Russia | | 2011 | Israel | M | title application |
| Kholmov, Ratmir | 4101090 | 1925-05-13 | Shenkursk | 2006-02-18 | 1960 | Soviet Union | M | later Russia |
| Khotenashvili, Bella | 13602640 | 1988-06-01 | Telavi | | 2013 | Georgia | F | title application |
| Khruschiov, Alexey | 13900544 | 1982-03-12 | Chișinău | | 2007 | Moldova | M | title application |
| Khubukshanov, Erdem | 54114527 | 2007-01-25 | Ulan-Ude | | 2026 | FIDE | M | GM title application |
| Khusnutdinov, Rustam | 13701703 | 1987-07-11 | Karaganda | | 2009 | Kazakhstan | M | title application |
| Kim, Alexey | 4129776 | 1986-04-05 | Tashkent | | 2004 | Russia | M | currently South Korea |
| Kindermann, Stefan | 4600053 | 1959-12-28 | Vienna | | 1988 | West Germany | M | later Germany; currently Austria |
| King, Daniel J. | 400068 | 1963-08-28 | Beckenham | | 1989 | England | M | |
| Kiriakov, Petr | 4119231 | 1975-01-11 | Krasnoyarsk | | 1998 | Russia | M | |
| Kirov, Nino | 2900076 | 1945-09-09 | Blagoevgrad | 2008-09-25 | 1975 | Bulgaria | M | (Note: Di Felice and Gaige give Kirov's date of birth as 9 Sep 1945, but some sources such as Chess24 – Nino Kirov (1945–2008) (in Bulgarian) give 11 Sep 1945) |
| Kiselev, Vitalii | 4194128 | 1988-06-16 | Rostov-on-Don | | 2007 | Russia | M | title application; currently Argentina |
| Kishnev, Sergey | 4100751 | 1956-11-01 | | | 1996 | Russia | M | |
| Kislinsky, Alexey | 14108801 | 1984-06-10 | Kyiv | | 2008 | Ukraine | M | title application; currently Czech Republic |
| Kjartansson, Guðmundur | 2301318 | 1988-03-06 | Reykjavík | | 2021 | Iceland | M | title application |
| Klarić, Zlatko | 14500248 | 1956-10-24 | Borovo | | 1983 | Yugoslavia | M | currently Croatia |
| Klein, David | 1003623 | 1993-12-20 | Haarlem | | 2014 | Netherlands | M | title application |
| Klekowski, Maciej | 1132717 | 1992-09-05 | Częstochowa | | 2020 | Poland | M | title application |
| Klimkowski, Jan | 21856222 | 2007 | | | 2025 | Poland | M | title application |
| Klimov, Sergey | 4121759 | 1979-01-22 | Leningrad | | 2009 | Russia | M | title application (Note: Di Felice indicates Klimov received the GM title in 2008, but the FIDE Golden Book gives 2009.) |
| Klinger, Josef | 1600010 | 1967-06-06 | St. Johann im Pongau | | 1988 | Austria | M | |
| Klovāns, Jānis | 11600128 | 1935-04-09 | Ruba | 2010-10-05 | 1997 | Latvia | M | |
| Knaak, Rainer | 4611250 | 1953-03-16 | Pasewalk | | 1975 | East Germany | M | currently Germany |
| Knežević, Milorad | 900494 | 1936-10-31 | Cetinje | 2005-03-31 | 1976 | Yugoslavia | M | later Serbia and Montenegro |
| Kobalia, Mikhail | 4119150 | 1978-05-03 | | | 1996 | Russia | M | |
| Kobo, Ori | 2812320 | 1997-04-24 | Israel | | 2017 | Israel | M | title application |
| Kochyev, Alexander | 4100719 | 1956-03-25 | Leningrad | | 1977 | Soviet Union | M | currently Russia |
| Kogan, Arthur | 2800802 | 1974-01-29 | Chernivtsi | | 1998 | Israel | M | |
| Kokarev, Dmitry | 4132181 | 1982-02-18 | Penza | | 2007 | Russia | M | title application |
| Kolev, Atanas | 2900130 | 1967-07-15 | Botevgrad | | 1993 | Bulgaria | M | |
| Kollars, Dmitrij | 12909572 | 1999-08-13 | Bremen | | 2017 | Germany | M | title application |
| Koltanowski, George | | 1903-09-17 | Antwerp | 2000-02-05 | 1988 | Belgium | M | honorary; later United States |
| Komarov, Dimitri | 14101270 | 1968-12-01 | | | 1994 | Ukraine | M | |
| Komliakov, Viktor | 13900030 | 1960-04-25 | | | 1995 | Moldova | M | |
| Komljenović, Davorin | 14500132 | 1944-07-01 | Mostar | | 1991 | Croatia | M | |
| Koneru, Humpy | 5008123 | 1987-03-31 | Vijayawada | | 2002 | India | F | |
| Kong, Xiangrui | 8632200 | 2009 | | | 2026 | China | M | IM title application; winner 2026 Asian Individual Chess Championship |
| Koniushkov, Igor | 4121376 | 1962-11-29 | | | 1998 | Russia | M | |
| Kononenko, Dmitry | 14113007 | 1988-08-23 | Dnipro | | 2007 | Ukraine | M | title application |
| Konovalov, Nikolay | 4170962 | 1989-08-07 | Moscow | | 2017 | Russia | M | title application |
| Konstantinopolsky, Alexander | | 1910-02-19 | Zhitomir | 1990-09-21 | 1983 | Soviet Union | M | honorary |
| Korchnoi, Viktor | 1300016 | 1931-03-23 | Leningrad | 2016-06-06 | 1956 | Soviet Union | M | later Switzerland |
| Kore, Akshayraj | 5012414 | 1988-09-01 | Ahmednagar | | 2013 | India | M | title application |
| Korneev, Oleg | 4156803 | 1969-07-25 | | | 1995 | Russia | M | currently Spain |
| Kornev, Alexei | 4120949 | 1976-12-20 | Vyazniki | | 2004 | Russia | M | |
| Korobov, Anton | 14105730 | 1985-06-25 | Kemerovo | | 2003 | Ukraine | M | |
| Korotylev, Alexey | 4119142 | 1977-03-01 | Moscow | | 2000 | Russia | M | |
| Korpa, Bence | 706671 | 1998-01-12 | Hungary | | 2017 | Hungary | M | title application |
| Kosakowski, Jakub | 1185080 | 2002-01-07 | | | 2025 | Poland | M | title application; IM title application |
| Kosanović, Goran A. | 901466 | 1962-03-16 | Belgrade (Zemun) | | 1998 | Yugoslavia (S&M) | M | currently Serbia |
| Kosashvili, Yona | 2800080 | 1970-07-03 | Tbilisi | | 1994 | Israel | M | |
| Kosić, Dragan | 900290 | 1970-02-15 | Sremska Mitrovica | | 1995 | Yugoslavia (S&M) | M | currently Montenegro |
| Kosintseva, Nadezhda | 4134974 | 1985-01-14 | Arkhangelsk | | 2011 | Russia | F | title application |
| Kosintseva, Tatiana | 4133471 | 1986-04-11 | Arkhangelsk | | 2009 | Russia | F | title application |
| Kosten, Anthony C. | 400114 | 1958-07-24 | London | | 1990 | England | M | later France, currently England |
| Kosteniuk, Alexandra | 4128125 | 1984-04-23 | Perm | | 2004 | Russia | F | currently Switzerland |
| Kostenko, Petr | 13700669 | 1976-02-16 | Kustanay | | 2006 | Kazakhstan | M | |
| Kostić, Boris | | 1887-02-24 | Vršac | 1963-11-03 | 1950 | Yugoslavia | M | Gaige |
| Kostić, Vladimir G. | 901482 | 1953-08-20 | Valjevo | | 2005 | Serbia and Montenegro | M | title application; currently Serbia |
| Kosyrev, Vladimir | 4122259 | 1980-11-07 | | | 2001 | Russia | M | |
| Kotanjian, Tigran | 13301250 | 1981-09-01 | Yerevan | | 2006 | Armenia | M | |
| Kotov, Alexander | | 1913-08-12 | Tula | 1981-01-08 | 1950 | Soviet Union | M | Gaige |
| Kotronias, Vasilios | 5900212 | 1964-08-25 | Athens | | 1990 | Greece | M | later Cyprus; currently Greece |
| Kotsur, Pavel | 13700278 | 1974-01-03 | Astana | | 1996 | Kazakhstan | M | |
| Kouatly, Bachar | 600032 | 1958-03-03 | Damascus | | 1989 | France | M | |
| Kourkoulos-Arditis, Stamatis | 4221990 | 1998-06-07 | | | 2023 | Greece | M | title application; IM title application |
| Kovačević, Aleksandar | 903124 | 1974-02-11 | Zurich | | 2000 | Yugoslavia (S&M) | M | currently Serbia |
| Kovačević, Blažimir | 14502712 | 1975-10-16 | Osijek | | 2018 | Croatia | M | title application |
| Kovačević, Vlatko | 14500078 | 1942-03-26 | Dubrovnik | | 1976 | Yugoslavia | M | currently Croatia |
| Kovalenko, Igor | 14117908 | 1988-12-29 | Novomoskovsk, Ukraine | | 2011 | Ukraine | M | title application; later Latvia, currently Ukraine |
| Kovalev, Andrei | 13500023 | 1961-11-07 | Vitebsk | | 1992 | Belarus | M | |
| Kovalev, Vladislav | 13504398 | 1994-01-06 | Minsk | | 2013 | Belarus | M | title application; currently FIDE |
| Kovalyov, Anton | 114987 | 1992-03-04 | Kharkiv | | 2008 | Argentina | M | title application; currently Canada |
| Kovchan, Alexander | 14103052 | 1983-10-21 | Chernigov | | 2002 | Ukraine | M | |
| Kozák, Ádám | 753246 | 2002-06-15 | Budapest | | 2020 | Hungary | M | title application |
| Koziak, Vitali | 14102234 | 1975 | | | 2025 | Ukraine | M | title application |
| Kožul, Zdenko | 14502879 | 1966-05-21 | Bihać | | 1989 | Yugoslavia | M | later Bosnia and Herzegovina; currently Croatia |
| Kraai, Jesse | 2002035 | 1972-05-06 | Santa Fe | | 2007 | United States | M | title application |
| Kraidman, Yair | 2800187 | 1932-11-01 | Haifa | | 1976 | Israel | M | |
| Krakops, Māris | 11600462 | 1978-04-03 | | | 1998 | Latvia | M | |
| Kramer, Julian | 12921742 | 1997 | | | 2025 | Germany | M | title application |
| Krämer, Martin | 4671910 | 1987-12-23 | Erfurt | | 2012 | Germany | M | title application |
| Kramnik, Vladimir | 4101588 | 1975-06-25 | Tuapse | | 1992 | Russia | M | |
| Krapivin, Alexander | 4154720 | 1987-07-23 | Moscow | | 2007 | Russia | M | title application |
| Krasenkow, Michał | 1113100 | 1963-11-14 | Moscow | | 1989 | Soviet Union | M | formerly Mikhail Krasenkov; later Russia; currently Poland |
| Kraus, Tomáš | 331708 | 1995-08-30 | | | 2024 | Czech Republic | M | title application; IM title application |
| Kravtsiv, Martyn | 14113147 | 1990-11-26 | Lviv | | 2009 | Ukraine | M | title application |
| Kreiman, Boris | 2007770 | 1976-06-07 | Moscow | | 2004 | United States | M | |
| Krejčí, Ján | 322156 | 1992-09-27 | | | 2011 | Czech Republic | M | title application |
| Kristiansen, Jens | 1400061 | 1952-05-25 | Copenhagen | | 2012 | Denmark | M | winner 22nd World Senior Chess Championships |
| Kristjánsson, Stefán | 2301172 | 1982-12-08 | Reykjavík | 2018-02-28 | 2011 | Iceland | M | title application |
| Kritz, Leonid | 4653530 | 1984-02-26 | Moscow | | 2003 | Germany | M | |
| Krivoborodov, Egor | 4155890 | 1989-12-24 | Moscow | | 2011 | Russia | M | title application; now Germany |
| Krivoshey, Sergei | 14102226 | 1971-05-23 | Zhitomir | | 2006 | Ukraine | M | |
| Krogius, Nikolai V. | 4100565 | 1930-07-22 | Saratov | 2022-07-14 | 1964 | Soviet Union | M | Gaige; later Russia |
| Kruppa, Yuri | 14100142 | 1964-06-21 | | | 1995 | Ukraine | M | |
| Krush, Irina | 2012782 | 1983-12-24 | Odesa | | 2013 | United States | F | title application |
| Kryakvin, Dmitry | 4153278 | 1984-04-10 | Rostov-on-Don | | 2009 | Russia | M | title application |
| Krylov, Mikhail | 4151364 | 1987-06-14 | Moscow | | 2012 | Russia | M | title application |
| Krysa, Leandro | 116807 | 1992-11-07 | Buenos Aires | | 2017 | Argentina | M | title application |
| Kryvoruchko, Yuriy | 14109182 | 1986-12-19 | Lviv | | 2006 | Ukraine | M | title application |
| Krzyżanowski, Marcin | 1132199 | 1994-01-11 | Rybnik | | 2020 | Poland | M | title application |
| Kuczyński, Robert | 1100033 | 1966-04-17 | Jelenia Góra | | 1993 | Poland | M | |
| Kudrin, Sergey | 2000164 | 1959-09-07 | Novosibirsk | | 1984 | United States | M | |
| Kulaots, Kaido | 4500261 | 1976-02-28 | Pärnu | | 2001 | Estonia | M | |
| Kuligowski, Adam | 1100092 | 1955-12-24 | Warsaw | | 1980 | Poland | M | |
| Kuljašević, Davorin | 14506661 | 1986-10-22 | Zagreb | | 2010 | Croatia | M | title application |
| Kumaran, Dharshan | 401978 | 1975-06-07 | | | 1997 | England | M | |
| Kunin, Vitaly | 4128737 | 1983-10-02 | Moscow | | 2006 | Germany | M | |
| Kunte, Abhijit | 5002265 | 1977-03-03 | Pune | | 2000 | India | M | |
| Kupreichik, Viktor | 13500066 | 1949-07-03 | Minsk | 2017-05-22 | 1980 | Soviet Union | M | later Belarus |
| Kurajica, Bojan | 14400057 | 1947-11-15 | Ljubljana | | 1974 | Yugoslavia | M | (Note: Di Felice lists Kurajica's title year as 1975, but the FIDE Golden Book has 1974.) later Bosnia and Herzegovina; currently Croatia |
| Kurnosov, Igor | 4142527 | 1985-05-30 | Chelyabinsk | 2013-08-08 | 2003 | Russia | M | |
| Kutirov, Rolando | 15000010 | 1962-01-23 | | | 1996 | North Macedonia | M | |
| Kuybokarov, Temur | 14203049 | 2000-07-22 | Tashkent | | 2019 | Australia | M | title application |
| Kuzmin, Alexey | 4100794 | 1963-03-08 | | | 1995 | Russia | M | |
| Kuzmin, Gennady | 14100070 | 1946-01-19 | Mariinsk | 2020-02-28 | 1973 | Ukraine | M | |
| Kuzubov, Yuriy | 14112906 | 1990-01-26 | Sychyovka | | 2005 | Ukraine | M | title application (Note: Birthdate and birthplace are from "КУЗУБОВ ЮРИЙ" [Kuzubov Yuri], www.chesspage.kiev.ua (in Ukrainian), 19 January 2005) |
| Kvaløy, Aksel Bu | 1528815 | 2008 | | | 2025 | Norway | M | GM title application |
| Kveinys, Aloyzas | 12800040 | 1962-07-09 | Vilnius | 2018-07-26 | 1992 | Lithuania | M | |
| Kvon, Andrey | 14201356 | 1989-04-16 | Tashkent | | 2018 | Uzbekistan | M | title application |
| Ladva, Ottomar | 4500024 | 1997-06-17 | Haapsalu | | 2016 | Estonia | M | title application |
| Lafuente, Pablo | 108820 | 1985-02-20 | Buenos Aires | | 2008 | Argentina | M | title application |
| Lagarde, Maxime | 662399 | 1994-03-16 | Niort | | 2013 | France | M | title application |
| Lagno, Kateryna | 14109336 | 1989-12-27 | Lviv | | 2007 | Ukraine | F | title application; currently Russia |
| Lajthajm, Borko | 916358 | 1976-04-16 | Belgrade (Zemun) | | 2007 | Serbia | M | title application |
| Lalić, Bogdan | 409081 | 1964-03-08 | Zagreb | | 1988 | Yugoslavia | M | later England; currently Croatia |
| Lalit Babu M. R. | 5024595 | 1993-01-05 | Vijayawada | | 2012 | India | M | title application |
| Lamard, Guillaume | 600261 | 1997-05-02 | Cannes | | 2024 | France | M | IM title application |
| L'Ami, Erwin | 1007998 | 1985-04-05 | Woerden | | 2005 | Netherlands | M | title application |
| Lampert, Jonas | 1303759 | 1997-08-27 | Hamburg | | 2020 | Germany | M | title application |
| Landa, Konstantin | 4101685 | 1972-05-22 | Omsk | 2022-10-12 | 1995 | Russia | M | |
| Lanka, Zigurds | 11600047 | 1960-05-21 | Baldone | | 1992 | Latvia | M | |
| Lariño Nieto, David | 2256444 | 1989-05-22 | Esteiro | | 2013 | Spain | M | title application |
| Larsen, Bent | 1400029 | 1935-03-04 | Tilsted, near Thisted | 2010-09-09 | 1956 | Denmark | M | |
| Lashkin, Jegor | 13907808 | 2003-09-07 | Tiraspol | | 2025 | Moldova | M | GM title application |
| Lastin, Alexander | 4119240 | 1976-10-30 | | 2015-01-23 | 1997 | Russia | M | |
| Lau, Ralf | 4600134 | 1959-10-19 | Delmenhorst | | 1986 | West Germany | M | currently Germany |
| Laurent-Paoli, Pierre | 26017962 | 2000-12-03 | | | 2023 | France | M | title application IM Norm |
| Laurušas, Tomas | 12803731 | 1996-02-13 | Kaunas | | 2021 | Lithuania | M | title application; IM title application |
| Lautier, Joël | 600016 | 1973-04-12 | Scarborough | | 1990 | France | M | |
| Laxman, R. R. | 5005361 | 1983-02-05 | Chennai | | 2009 | India | M | title application |
| Laylo, Darwin | 5201330 | 1980-06-01 | | | 2007 | Philippines | M | |
| Lazarev, Vladimir | 4113250 | 1964-06-05 | Saratov | | 2000 | Russia | M | currently France |
| Lazavik, Denis | 13515110 | 2006-11-17 | | | 2022 | Belarus | M | title application |
| Lazić, Miroljub | 900788 | 1966-06-28 | Lesnica | | 1995 | Yugoslavia (S&M) | M | currently Serbia |
| Laznicka, Viktor | 316385 | 1988-01-09 | Pardubice | | 2006 | Czechoslovakia | M | currently Czech Republic |
| Lê Quang Liêm | 12401137 | 1991-03-13 | Ho Chi Minh City | | 2006 | Vietnam | M | title application |
| Lê Tuấn Minh | 12401153 | 1996-10-21 | | | 2022 | Vietnam | M | title application; IM title application |
| Le Roux, Jean-Pierre | 609404 | 1982-05-18 | Guingamp | | 2010 | France | M | title application (Note: Di Felice gives Le Roux's date of birth as 1 May 1982, but his GM title application says 5 May.) |
| Lechtýnský, Jiří | 300217 | 1947-11-25 | Jablonec nad Nisou | | 1982 | Czech Republic | M | |
| Leenhouts, Koen | 1008439 | 1984-01-10 | Oostburg | | 2023 | Netherlands | M | title application; IM title application |
| Legky, Nikolay A. | 14100312 | 1955-04-11 | | | 1994 | Ukraine | M | currently France |
| Lehmann, Heinz | | 1921-10-20 | Kaliningrad | 1995-06-08 | 1992 | West Germany | M | honorary; later Germany |
| Lei Tingjie | 8605114 | 1997-03-03 | Chongqing | | 2017 | China | F | title application (Note: Lei's WGM title application lists her birthday as 13 March 1997, but Di Felice and her GM title application have 3 March.) |
| Lein, Anatoly | 2000270 | 1931-03-28 | Leningrad | 2018-03-01 | 1968 | Soviet Union | M | Gaige; later United States |
| Leitão, Rafael | 2101246 | 1979-12-28 | São Luís, Maranhão | | 1998 | Brazil | M | |
| Leko, Peter | 703303 | 1979-09-08 | Subotica | | 1994 | Hungary | M | |
| Lemos, Damián | 113581 | 1990-04-02 | Buenos Aires | | 2009 | Argentina | M | title application |
| Lenderman, Aleksandr | 2021285 | 1989-09-23 | Leningrad | | 2010 | United States | M | title application |
| Lengyel, Levente | 700541 | 1933-06-13 | Debrecen | 2014-08-18 | 1964 | Hungary | M | |
| Lenič, Luka | 14603853 | 1988-05-13 | Ljubljana | | 2007 | Slovenia | M | title application (Note: Lenič's GM application lists his birthday as 13 August 1988, but Di Felice gives 13 May.) |
| León Hoyos, Manuel | 5105269 | 1989-02-10 | Mérida, Yucatán | | 2008 | Mexico | M | title application |
| Lerner, Konstantin | 14100061 | 1950-02-28 | Odesa | 2011-09-24 | 1986 | Soviet Union | M | later Ukraine |
| Lesiège, Alexandre | 2600170 | 1975-08-18 | Montreal | | 1998 | Canada | M | |
| Leniart, Arkadiusz | 1124226 | 1991-06-20 | Warsaw | | 2020 | Poland | M | title application |
| Lev, Ronen | 2800063 | 1968-09-22 | | | 1994 | Israel | M | |
| Levenfish, Grigory | | 1889-03-21 | Petrokov | 1961-02-09 | 1950 | Soviet Union | M | Gaige; born 21 Mar [O.S. 9 Mar] |
| Leventić, Ivan | 14500442 | 1970-09-21 | | | 2005 | Croatia | M | title application |
| Levin, Evgeny A. | 4182596 | 1990-06-26 | Russia | | 2010 | Russia | M | title application |
| Levin, Felix | 4650905 | 1958-11-05 | Lviv | | 1998 | Germany | M | |
| Levitt, Jonathan P. | 400220 | 1963-06-03 | London | | 1990 | England | M | |
| Li Chao | 8604436 | 1989-04-21 | Taiyuan | | 2007 | China | M | title application |
| Li Di | 8607508 | 1999-12-15 | Chengdu | | 2019 | China | M | title application |
| Li Ruifeng | 2061074 | 2001-09-14 | Hangzhou | | 2017 | United States | M | title application |
| Li Shilong | 8600678 | 1977-08-10 | | | 2002 | China | M | |
| Liang, Awonder | 2056437 | 2003-04-09 | Madison | | 2017 | United States | M | title application |
| Liang Chong | 8600899 | 1980-01-29 | Guangzhou | | 2004 | China | M | |
| Liang, Jason | 30940303 | 2007 | | | 2026 | United States | M | GM title application |
| Liang Jinrong | 8600066 | 1960-05-21 | Guangdong | | 1998 | China | M | |
| Liberzon, Vladimir | | 1937-03-23 | Moscow | 1996-08-04 | 1965 | Soviet Union | M | (Note: Di Felice gives Liberzon's title year as 1966, but both Gaige and The FIDE Golden Book have 1965.) later Israel |
| Libiszewski, Fabien | 616834 | 1984-01-05 | Saint-Étienne | | 2009 | France | M | title application |
| Lie, Kjetil A. | 1501984 | 1980-11-18 | Porsgrunn | | 2005 | Norway | M | title application |
| Likavský, Tomáš | 14900483 | 1971-07-28 | Zvolen | | 2005 | Slovakia | M | title application |
| Lilienthal, Andor | 700436 | 1911-05-05 | Moscow | 2010-05-08 | 1950 | Soviet Union | M | later Hungary |
| Lima, Darcy | 2100045 | 1962-05-22 | Rio de Janeiro | | 1997 | Brazil | M | |
| Lin Chen | 8602298 | 1988-09-14 | Jiangsu | | 2016 | China | M | title application |
| Lintchevski, Daniil | 4171055 | 1990-05-17 | Gatchina | | 2009 | Russia | M | title application |
| Liss, Eran | 2800721 | 1975-07-02 | | | 1995 | Israel | M | |
| Liu Qingnan | 8603294 | 1992-05-23 | Shandong | | 2015 | China | M | title application |
| Liu Yan | 8608962 | 2000-03-29 | Chongqing | | 2018 | China | M | title application |
| Livaić, Leon | 14531534 | 2000-10-16 | Zagreb | | 2022 | Croatia | M | title application; IM title application |
| Ljubojević, Ljubomir | 900010 | 1950-11-02 | Užice | | 1971 | Yugoslavia | M | currently Serbia |
| Llanes Hurtado, Miguel | 2206706 | 1978-10-05 | Don Benito | | 2008 | Spain | M | title application |
| Lobanov, Sergei | 24183750 | 2001-05-19 | Saint Petersburg | | 2022 | Russia | M | title application; IM title application |
| Lobron, Eric | 4600037 | 1960-05-07 | Philadelphia | | 1982 | Germany | M | |
| Lodici, Lorenzo | 884189 | 2000-04-16 | Brescia | | 2021 | Italy | M | title application; IM title application |
| Loginov, Valery A | 4126297 | 1955-12-13 | Syzran | | 1991 | Russia | M | |
| Lomasov, Semyon | 24164879 | 2002-02-04 | | | 2021 | Russia | M | title application; IM title application; currently Israel |
| Lombardy, William | 2000415 | 1937-12-04 | New York City | 2017-10-13 | 1960 | United States | M | Gaige |
| Lomsadze, Davit | 13603450 | 1991-02-12 | | | 2016 | Georgia | M | title application |
| López Martínez, Josep Manuel | 2212943 | 1980-04-24 | Barcelona | | 2007 | Spain | M | title application |
| Lopushnoy, Denis | 4123395 | 1977-01-30 | | | 2000 | Russia | M | |
| Lorenzini, Martin | 105570 | 1975-09-26 | Santa Fe, Argentina | | 2014 | Argentina | M | title application |
| Lorparizangeneh, Shahin | 12521604 | 1999-01-16 | Isfahan | | 2017 | Iran | M | title application |
| Lputian, Smbat G. | 13300024 | 1958-02-14 | Yerevan | | 1984 | Soviet Union | M | currently Armenia |
| Lu Shanglei | 8603332 | 1995-07-10 | Liaoning | | 2011 | China | M | title application |
| Lubbe, Nikolas | 4694031 | 1990-08-14 | Wilhelmshaven | | 2023 | Germany | M | title application; IM title application |
| Lugovoi, Aleksei | 4116194 | 1975-03-05 | | | 1998 | Russia | M | |
| Lugovskoy, Maxim | 24126454 | 1996-08-14 | Kurganinsk | | 2017 | Russia | M | title application |
| Liutsko, Igor | 13500716 | 1962-04-06 | Minsk | | 2004 | Belarus | M | |
| Lukács, Péter | 700142 | 1950-07-09 | Budapest | | 1986 | Hungary | M | |
| Lukov, Valentin | 2900157 | 1955-12-11 | Pazardzhik | | 1988 | Bulgaria | M | |
| Lundin, Erik | | 1904-07-02 | Stockholm | 1988-12-05 | 1983 | Sweden | M | honorary |
| Lunev, Andrey | 4120957 | 1969-01-21 | | | 2001 | Russia | M | |
| Lupu, Mircea-Sergiu | 621501 | 1962-08-28 | Negrești | | 1995 | Romania | M | (Note: The FIDE Golden Book lists Lupu's title year as 1994; Di Felice gives 1995.) currently France |
| Lupulescu, Constantin | 1207822 | 1984-03-25 | Buftea | | 2006 | Romania | M | |
| Luther, Thomas | 4611420 | 1969-11-04 | Erfurt | | 1994 | Germany | M | |
| Lutikov, Anatoly | | 1933-02-05 | Leningrad | 1989-10-15 | 1974 | Soviet Union | M | |
| Lutz, Christopher | 4600193 | 1971-02-24 | Neukirchen | | 1992 | Germany | M | |
| Ly, Moulthun | 3204405 | 1991-11-20 | Cambodia | | 2016 | Australia | M | title application |
| Lysyj, Igor | 4150120 | 1987-01-01 | Nizhny Tagil | | 2007 | Russia | M | title application |
| Ma Qun | 8603154 | 1991-11-09 | Shandong | | 2013 | China | M | title application |
| Machulsky, Anatoly | 4100417 | 1956-09-24 | Bezhetsk | 2017-02-17 | 1991 | Russia | M | |
| Macieja, Bartłomiej | 1104306 | 1977-10-04 | Warsaw | | 1998 | Poland | M | |
| Madaminov, Mukhiddin | 14210703 | 2006-11-02 | | | 2024 | Uzbekistan | M | title application; IM title application |
| Magem Badals, Jordi | 2200074 | 1967-08-24 | Manresa | | 1994 | Spain | M | |
| Magerramov, Elmar | 13400142 | 1958-04-10 | Baku | | 1992 | Azerbaijan | M | (Note: Di Felice lists Magerramov's title year as 1990, but the FIDE Golden Book has 1992.) |
| Maghalashvili, Davit | 13602276 | 1987-06-27 | | | 2014 | Georgia | M | title application |
| Maghsoodloo, Parham | 12539929 | 2000-08-11 | Gorgan | | 2016 | Iran | M | title application |
| Magomedov, Magaram | 4156757 | 1966-05-20 | Khuri | | 1998 | Tajikistan | M | currently Russia |
| Mahjoob Zardast, Morteza | 12500798 | 1980-03-20 | Tehran | | 2007 | Iran | M | (Note: Mahjoob Zardast's GM title application lists his birthday as 28 March 1980, but Di Felice has 20 March.) title application |
| Mainka, Romuald | 4600258 | 1963-05-15 | Gliwice | | 1993 | Germany | M | |
| Mayorau, Mikita | 13501720 | 1985-04-19 | Vitebsk | | 2007 | Belarus | M | title application; currently Poland, also Nikita Maiorov |
| Maiorov, Oleg | 4119916 | 1971-07-21 | | | 1999 | Russia | M | |
| Maiwald, Jens-Uwe | 4612396 | 1974-05-06 | Dresden | | 1999 | Germany | M | |
| Makarian, Rudik | 44105681 | 2004-07-30 | Alatumani, Georgia | | 2025 | Russia | M | GM title application; IM title application |
| Makarichev, Sergey | 4100468 | 1953-11-17 | Moscow | | 1976 | Soviet Union | M | currently Russia |
| Makhnev, Denis | 13707647 | 2000-02-20 | Pavlodar | | 2021 | Kazakhstan | M | title application |
| Makarov, Marat | 4101103 | 1963-05-07 | | | 1993 | Russia | M | |
| Makogonov, Vladimir | | 1904-08-27 | Nakhichivan | 1993-01-02 | 1987 | Soviet Union | M | honorary |
| Maksimenko, Andrei | 14100584 | 1969-12-07 | Cherkasy | | 1995 | Ukraine | M | |
| Maksimović, Bojan | 14408120 | 2002-06-11 | Banja Luka | | 2025 | Bosnia and Herzegovina | M | GM title application; currently Serbia |
| Malakhatko, Vadim | 14104202 | 1977-03-22 | Kyiv | 2023-06-05 | 1999 | Ukraine | M | later Belgium |
| Malakhov, Vladimir | 4120787 | 1980-11-27 | Ivanovo | | 1998 | Russia | M | |
| Malaniuk, Vladimir | 14100177 | 1957-07-21 | Arkhangelsk | 2017-07-02 | 1987 | Soviet Union | M | later Ukraine |
| Malek, Jan | 21864080 | 2007 | | | 2025 | Poland | M | title application |
| Maletin, Pavel | 4146786 | 1986-11-06 | Novosibirsk | | 2007 | Russia | M | title application |
| Malich, Burkhard | 4611330 | 1936-11-29 | Schweidnitz-Świdnica | | 1975 | East Germany | M | currently Germany |
| Malinin, Vasily B. | 4140249 | 1956-04-26 | Petrozavodsk | 2020-11-22 | 2003 | Russia | M | |
| Mališauskas, Vidmantas | 12800031 | 1963-08-04 | | | 1993 | Lithuania | M | |
| Mamedov, Edgar | 13739980 | 2010-06-18 | | | 2025 | Kazakhstan | M | title application |
| Mamedov, Nidjat | 13400819 | 1985-04-02 | Nakhchivan | | 2006 | Azerbaijan | M | |
| Mamedov, Rauf | 13401653 | 1988-04-26 | Baku | | 2004 | Azerbaijan | M | |
| Mamedyarov, Shakhriyar | 13401319 | 1985-04-12 | Sumgait | | 2002 | Azerbaijan | M | |
| Mammadov, Zaur | 13401033 | 1994-04-16 | Baku | | 2015 | Azerbaijan | M | title application |
| Maník, Mikuláš | 14900734 | 1975-05-26 | Košice | | 2006 | Slovakia | M | title application |
| Manolache, Marius | 1201530 | 1973-04-22 | Galați | | 2007 | Romania | M | title application (Note: Manolache's GM title application lists his birth year as 1974, but Di Felice has 1973.) |
| Manor, Ilan | 2800110 | 1969-10-26 | Haifa | | 1996 | Israel | M | |
| Marcelin, Cyril | 607274 | 1979-03-16 | Suresnes | | 2002 | France | M | |
| Marciano, David | 600423 | 1969-07-04 | Toulouse | | 1998 | France | M | currently Monaco |
| Mareco, Sandro | 112275 | 1987-05-13 | Haedo | | 2010 | Argentina | M | title application |
| Margvelashvili, Giorgi | 13602926 | 1990-02-09 | Tbilisi | | 2010 | Georgia | M | title application |
| Mariano, Nelson | 5200610 | 1974-06-28 | Manila | | 2004 | Philippines | M | |
| Marin, Mihail | 1200020 | 1965-04-21 | Bucharest | | 1993 | Romania | M | |
| Mariotti, Sergio | 800023 | 1946-08-10 | Florence | | 1974 | Italy | M | |
| Marić, Rudolf | | 1927-05-13 | Novi Sad | 1990-08-26 | 1990 | Yugoslavia | M | honorary |
| Marjanović, Slavoljub | 900354 | 1955-01-06 | Lalinac (Niš) | 2026-03-08 | 1978 | Yugoslavia | M | later Serbia |
| Markoš, Ján | 14903474 | 1985-07-02 | Banská Bystrica | | 2007 | Slovakia | M | title application |
| Markosian, David S. | 13300466 | 1972-01-24 | Stepanakert | | 2008 | Armenia | M | title application |
| Marković, Miroslav | 901504 | 1973-05-08 | | | 1999 | Yugoslavia (S&M) | M | currently Serbia |
| Markowski, Tomasz | 1105680 | 1975-07-30 | Głogów | | 1998 | Poland | M | |
| Markuš, Robert | 921637 | 1983-10-07 | Bačka Topola | | 2004 | Serbia and Montenegro | M | currently Serbia |
| Maróczy, Géza | | 1870-03-03 | Szeged | 1951-05-29 | 1950 | Hungary | M | Gaige |
| Marović, Dražen | 14500183 | 1938-01-14 | Split | | 1975 | Yugoslavia | M | currently Croatia |
| Maroroa Jones, Gawain C. B. | 409561 | 1987-12-11 | Keighley | | 2007 | England | M | title application |
| Martinez Alcantara, Jose Eduardo | 3805662 | 1999-01-31 | Lima | | 2018 | Peru | M | title application; currently Mexico |
| Martinez Duany, Lelys Stanley | 3504727 | 1985-07-10 | Santiago de Cuba | | 2009 | Cuba | M | title application |
| Martinović, Saša | 14509792 | 1991-07-15 | | | 2011 | Croatia | M | title application |
| Martinović, Slobodan | 900931 | 1945-07-25 | Belgrade | 2015-01-10 | 1979 | Yugoslavia | M | later Serbia |
| Martirosyan, Haik M. | 13306553 | 2000-07-14 | Artashat | | 2017 | Armenia | M | title application |
| Maslak, Konstantin | 4130901 | 1984-08-27 | Volgograd | | 2008 | Russia | M | title application |
| Mastrovasilis, Athanasios | 4201990 | 1979-04-18 | | | 2005 | Greece | M | title application |
| Mastrovasilis, Dimitrios | 4202694 | 1983-06-12 | | | 2003 | Greece | M | |
| Matamoros Franco, Carlos S. | 3600017 | 1966-12-17 | | | 2002 | Ecuador | M | |
| Matanović, Aleksandar | 900230 | 1930-05-23 | Belgrade | 2023-08-09 | 1955 | Yugoslavia | M | Gaige; later Serbia |
| Mateo, Ramón | 6400019 | 1958-06-23 | Santo Domingo | | 2008 | Dominican Republic | M | title application |
| Matinian, Nikita | 24129100 | 1992-04-21 | Aygehovit | | 2017 | Russia | M | title application |
| Matjushin, Gennady | 14107910 | 1984-08-23 | Makiivka | | 2007 | Ukraine | M | title application |
| Matlakov, Maxim | 4168003 | 1991-03-05 | Saint Petersburg | | 2010 | Russia | M | title application |
| Matsenko, Sergei | 4170083 | 1990-06-21 | Chelyabinsk | | 2018 | Russia | M | title application |
| Matsuura, Everaldo | 2100169 | 1970-10-01 | Maringá | | 2011 | Brazil | M | title application |
| Matulović, Milan | 900362 | 1935-06-10 | Belgrade | 2013-10-09 | 1965 | Yugoslavia | M | later Serbia |
| Matuszewski, Michał | 1129775 | 1993-01-06 | Warsaw | | 2019 | Poland | M | title application |
| Matviishen, Viktor | 14129850 | 2002-01-10 | Vinnytsia | | 2022 | Ukraine | M | title application |
| Maurizzi, Marc Andria | 36083534 | 2007-05-16 | Bastia | | 2021 | France | M | title application; IM title application |
| Maximov, Dmitry | 14105659 | 1984-07-20 | Dnipro | | 2008 | Ukraine | M | title application |
| Mayank Chakraborty | 25659766 | 2009 | | | 2026 | India | M | GM title application |
| Mazé, Sébastien | 613762 | 1984-02-08 | Paris | | 2007 | France | M | title application |
| McDonald, Neil | 400629 | 1967-01-21 | Gravesend | | 1996 | England | M | |
| McNab, Colin A. | 2400030 | 1961-02-03 | Dundee | | 1992 | Scotland | M | |
| McShane, Luke J. | 404853 | 1984-01-07 | London | | 2000 | England | M | |
| Mchedlishvili, Mikheil | 13600966 | 1979-06-04 | | | 2002 | Georgia | M | |
| Mecking, Henrique | 2100010 | 1952-01-23 | Santa Cruz do Sul | | 1972 | Brazil | M | |
| Mednis, Edmar | 2000440 | 1937-03-22 | Riga | 2002-02-13 | 1980 | United States | M | |
| Meduna, Eduard | 300055 | 1950-09-11 | Prague | | 1987 | Czechoslovakia | M | currently Czech Republic |
| Medvegy, Zoltán | 708402 | 1979-03-21 | | | 2002 | Hungary | M | |
| Megaranto, Susanto | 7101384 | 1987-10-08 | Indramayu | | 2004 | Indonesia | M | |
| Meier, Georg | 4675789 | 1987-08-26 | Trier | | 2007 | Germany | M | title application; currently Uruguay |
| Meijers, Viesturs | 11600314 | 1967-12-05 | Limbaži | 2024-11-09 | 2004 | Latvia | M | (Note: Di Felice gives 2005 as Meijers' title year, but the FIDE Golden Book has 2004.) |
| Meister, Jakob | 4102541 | 1955-09-11 | Kopeysk | | 2008 | Germany | M | title application |
| Mekhitarian, Krikor Sevag | 2107660 | 1986-11-15 | São Paulo | | 2010 | Brazil | M | title application |
| Melkumyan, Hrant | 13302485 | 1989-04-30 | Yerevan | | 2008 | Armenia | M | IM title application; title application |
| Mendonca, Leon Luke | 35028561 | 2006-03-13 | Goa | | 2021 | India | M | title application |
| Meshkovs, Nikita | 11602740 | 1994-06-30 | Riga | | 2017 | Latvia | M | title application |
| Mestel, A. Jonathan | 400122 | 1957-03-13 | Cambridge | | 1982 | England | M | |
| Mhamal, Anurag | 5024366 | 1995-04-28 | Panaji | | 2017 | India | M | title application |
| Michalik, Peter | 14907526 | 1990-09-15 | Prievidza | | 2011 | Slovakia | M | title application; later Czech Republic |
| Michiels, Bart | 202967 | 1986-10-30 | Gent | | 2014 | Belgium | M | title application |
| Mieses, Jacques | | 1865-02-27 | Leipzig | 1954-02-23 | 1950 | England | M | Gaige |
| Miezis, Normunds | 11600136 | 1971-05-11 | Olaine | | 1997 | Latvia | M | |
| Mihók, Olivér | 728012 | 1993-06-23 | | | 2015 | Hungary | M | title application |
| Mikaelyan, Arman | 13304852 | 1996-11-25 | Yerevan | | 2017 | Armenia | M | title application |
| Mikėnas, Vladas | | 1910-04-17 | Tallinn | 1992-11-03 | 1987 | Lithuania | M | honorary |
| Mikhalchishin, Adrian | 14602385 | 1954-11-18 | Lviv | | 1978 | Soviet Union | M | later Ukraine; currently Slovenia |
| Mikhaletz, Lubomir | 14102340 | 1974-08-15 | Khmelnytskyi | | 2000 | Ukraine | M | |
| Mikhalevski, Victor | 2801914 | 1972-07-08 | Gomel | | 1996 | Israel | M | (Note: Di Felice gives Mikhalevski's birthday as 8 July 1972, but FIDE Golden Book has 12 July.) |
| Miladinović, Igor | 4203380 | 1974-01-25 | Niš | | 1993 | Yugoslavia (S&M) | M | later Greece; currently Serbia |
| Milanović, Danilo | 915483 | 1974-01-18 | Smederevska Palanka | | 2008 | Serbia | M | title application |
| Miles, Anthony J. | 403385 | 1955-04-23 | Edgbaston | 2001-11-12 | 1976 | England | M | |
| Milić, Borislav | | 1925-10-20 | Belgrade | 1986-05-28 | 1977 | Yugoslavia | M | honorary (Note: Di Felice and Gaige give Milić's date of death as 27 May 1986, but some online sources have 28 May.) |
| Miljković, Miroslav D. | 922722 | 1985-05-06 | Niš | | 2013 | Serbia | M | title application |
| Milos, Gilberto | 2100029 | 1963-10-30 | São Paulo | | 1988 | Brazil | M | |
| Milov, Leonid | 14101068 | 1966-02-06 | Dniepropetrovsk | | 2012 | Germany | M | title application |
| Milov, Vadim | 1304364 | 1972-08-01 | Ufa | | 1993 | Switzerland | M | |
| Minasian, Ara | 13300377 | 1974-04-14 | Gyumri | | 2004 | Armenia | M | |
| Minasian, Artashes | 13300040 | 1967-01-21 | Yerevan | | 1992 | Armenia | M | |
| Minić, Dragoljub | 14500477 | 1937-03-05 | Podgorica | 2005-04-05 | 1991 | Yugoslavia | M | honorary; later Serbia and Montenegro (Note: Di Felice and several other sources (Gaige 1987, Golombek 1977, Kažić 1974) give 5 March 1937 as Minić's birthday. Some online sources published shortly after his death such as TWIC 546 said his birthday was 5 April 1936.) |
| Mirallès, Gilles | 600059 | 1966-02-08 | Grasse | 2022-01-28 | 1997 | France | M | |
| Miranda Mesa, Elier | 3510697 | 1993-01-29 | Villa Clara Province | | 2019 | Cuba | M | title application |
| Miron, Lucian-Costin | 1210920 | 1987-09-14 | Ploiești | | 2019 | Romania | M | title application |
| Miroshnichenko, Evgenij | 14102595 | 1978-12-28 | Donetsk | | 2002 | Ukraine | M | |
| Mishra, Abhimanyu | 30920019 | 2009-02-05 | Long Branch, New Jersey | | 2021 | United States | M | title application; IM title application |
| Mirumian, Vigen | 316180 | 1977-09-29 | Yerevan | | 2008 | Czech Republic | M | title application |
| Mirzoev, Azer | 13400304 | 1978-03-28 | Baku | | 2001 | Azerbaijan | M | |
| Mirzoev, Emil | 14108640 | 1996-08-15 | | | 2019 | Ukraine | M | title application |
| Miśta, Aleksander | 1110381 | 1983-01-07 | Myszków | | 2003 | Poland | M | |
| Mitkov, Nikola | 15000290 | 1971-12-18 | | | 1993 | North Macedonia | M | |
| Mitoń, Kamil | 1111914 | 1984-04-12 | Kraków | | 2002 | Poland | M | |
| Mitrabha, Guha | 5057000 | 2001-09-15 | Kolkata | | 2022 | India | M | title application; IM title application |
| Mittal, Aditya | 35042025 | 2006-09-19 | Medhauli, Madhya Pradesh | | 2023 | India | M | title application |
| Mogranzini, Roberto | 810894 | 1983-01-06 | Carpi | | 2013 | Italy | M | title application |
| Mohr, Georg | 14600013 | 1965-02-02 | Maribor | | 1997 | Slovenia | M | |
| Mohr, Stefan | 4600290 | 1967-10-22 | Frankfurt | | 1989 | Germany | M | |
| Moiseenko, Alexander | 14102560 | 1980-05-17 | Severomorsk | | 2000 | Ukraine | M | |
| Moiseenko, Vadim | 4123700 | 1994-07-07 | Bratsk | | 2018 | Russia | M | title application |
| Mokrý, Karel | 306070 | 1959-02-07 | Prostějov | 2026-05-27 | 1984 | Czechoslovakia | M | later Czech Republic |
| Mollah Abdullah, Al Rakib | 10200444 | 1980-12-02 | Narayanganj | | 2007 | Bangladesh | M | title application; also Abdullah Al Rakib |
| Ochsner, Bjorn Moller | 1416928 | 1994-10-23 | Aarhus | | 2023 | Denmark | M | title application; IM title application; certificate of GM title result |
| Molner, Mackenzie | 2021722 | 1988-08-01 | Englewood, New Jersey | | 2013 | United States | M | title application |
| Mons, Leon | 4614950 | 1995-09-10 | Lübeck | | 2018 | Germany | M | title application |
| Monticelli, Mario | | 1902-03-16 | Venice | 1995-06-30 | 1985 | Italy | M | honorary |
| Moradiabadi, Elshan | 12501255 | 1985-05-22 | Tehran | | 2005 | Iran | M | title application; currently United States |
| Moranda, Wojciech | 1122401 | 1988-08-17 | Kielce | | 2009 | Poland | M | title application |
| Moreno Carnero, Javier | 2224267 | 1975-06-07 | Buenos Aires | | 2003 | Spain | M | |
| Moroni, Luca Jr. | 865834 | 2000-07-01 | Desio | | 2017 | Italy | M | title application |
| Morovic Fernández, Iván | 3405400 | 1963-03-24 | Viña del Mar | | 1986 | Chile | M | |
| Moroz, Alexander | 14100509 | 1961-01-18 | Dniepropetrovsk | 2009-01-17 | 1999 | Ukraine | M | |
| Morozevich, Alexander | 4116992 | 1977-07-18 | Moscow | | 1994 | Russia | M | |
| Mosadeghpour, Masoud | 12519278 | 1997 | Mashhad | | 2017 | Iran | M | title application |
| Moskalenko, Alexander | 4155351 | 1988-06-08 | Zhytomyr Oblast | | 2018 | Russia | M | title application |
| Moskalenko, Viktor | 14100100 | 1960-12-04 | Odesa | | 1992 | Ukraine | M | currently Spain |
| Motwani, Paul | 2400022 | 1962-06-13 | Glasgow | | 1992 | Scotland | M | |
| Motylev, Alexander | 4121830 | 1979-06-17 | Yekaterinburg | | 2000 | Russia | M | currently Romania |
| Mousavi, Seyed Khalil | 12511099 | 1998-04-20 | Langarud | | 2022 | Iran | M | title application; IM title application |
| Moussard, Jules | 642908 | 1995-01-16 | Paris | | 2016 | France | M | title application |
| Movahed, Sina | 42520835 | 2010 | | | 2024 | Iran | M | title application |
| Movsesian, Sergei | 310204 | 1978-11-03 | Tbilisi | | 1997 | Slovakia | M | currently Armenia |
| Movsziszian, Karen | 13301152 | 1963-01-06 | Yerevan | | 1994 | Armenia | M | |
| Mozharov, Mikhail | 4189825 | 1990-10-19 | Moscow | | 2014 | Russia | M | title application |
| Mrva, Martin | 14900092 | 1971-12-12 | Prešov | | 2005 | Slovakia | M | title application |
| Muller, Karsten | 4600347 | 1970-11-23 | Hamburg | | 1998 | Germany | M | |
| Munkhgal, Gombosuren | 4901266 | 1988-09-06 | | | 2020 | Mongolia | M | GM title application (Note: Munkhgal's birthday is from his IM title application.) |
| Muradli, Mahammad | 13409301 | 2003-08-01 | Baku | | 2022 | Azerbaijan | M | title application; IM title application |
| Murali, Karthikeyan | 5074452 | 1999-01-05 | Thanjavur | | 2015 | India | M | title application (Note: Di Felice gives Karthikeyan as born in Chennai on 1 May 1999, but his GM title application has Thanjavur on 5 January.) |
| Murariu, Andrei | 1209272 | 1986-02-17 | Bârlad | | 2006 | Romania | M | |
| Muratović, Alija | 921661 | 1962-01-05 | Novi Pazar | | 2009 | Serbia | M | title application |
| Murey, Jacob | 2803585 | 1941-08-02 | Moscow | 2025-09-09 | 1987 | Israel | M | |
| Murshed, Niaz | 10200010 | 1966-05-13 | Dhaka | | 1987 | Bangladesh | M | |
| Muñoz, Miguel | 3800229 | 1975-10-10 | La Merced, Junín | | 2012 | Spain | M | title application; currently Peru |
| Murzin, Volodar | 44155573 | 2006-07-18 | Nizhny Tagil | | 2022 | Russia | M | title application; IM title application |
| Muše, Mladen | 4600304 | 1963-01-20 | Bjelovar | | 2001 | Germany | M | currently Croatia |
| Muzychuk, Anna | 14111330 | 1990-02-28 | Stryi | | 2012 | Slovenia | F | title application; currently Ukraine |
| Muzychuk, Mariya | 14114550 | 1992-09-21 | Stryi | | 2015 | Ukraine | F | Women's World Champion 2015–2016; IM title application |
| Nabaty, Tamir | 2809052 | 1991-05-04 | Ness Ziona | | 2011 | Israel | M | title application |
| Nadyrkhanov, Sergey | 4135830 | 1963-09-28 | | | 1999 | Russia | M | |
| Nagy, Gábor | 737119 | 1994-09-18 | | | 2020 | Hungary | M | title application |
| Naiditsch, Arkadij | 4650891 | 1985-10-25 | Riga | | 2001 | Germany | M | later Azerbaijan, currently Bulgaria |
| Najdorf, Miguel | | 1910-04-15 | Grodzisk Mazowiecki | 1997-07-04 | 1950 | Argentina | M | |
| Najdoski, Toni | 15001334 | 1970-05-04 | | | 1998 | North Macedonia | M | |
| Najer, Evgeniy | 4118987 | 1977-06-22 | Moscow | | 1999 | Russia | M | |
| Nakamura, Hikaru | 2016192 | 1987-12-09 | Hirakata | | 2003 | United States | M | |
| Nalbandian, Tigran | 13300245 | 1975-06-05 | Yerevan | 2025-06-28 | 2004 | Armenia | M | |
| Nanu, Costică-Ciprian | 1204580 | 1977-07-28 | Brașov | | 2010 | Romania | M | title application |
| Narayanan, S. L. | 5058422 | 1998-01-10 | Trivandrum | | 2016 | India | M | title application; Sunilduth Lyna Narayanan |
| Narayanan, Srinath | 5018420 | 1994-02-14 | Chennai | | 2017 | India | M | title application |
| Narciso Dublan, Marc | 2201500 | 1974-01-20 | Barcelona | | 2003 | Spain | M | |
| Naroditsky, Daniel | 2026961 | 1995-11-09 | San Mateo | 2025-10-19 | 2013 | United States | M | title application |
| Nasanjargal, Urtnasan | 4900774 | 1994-02-19 | | | 2020 | Mongolia | M | title application |
| Nasuta, Grzegorz | 1141686 | 1996-03-01 | Białystok | | 2018 | Poland | M | title application |
| Nataf, Igor-Alexandre | 605492 | 1978-05-02 | Paris | | 1998 | France | M | |
| Naumann, Alexander | 4623169 | 1979-02-17 | Magdeburg | | 2005 | Germany | M | title application |
| Naumkin, Igor | 4101715 | 1965-08-10 | Moscow | 2022-07-13 | 1990 | Russia | M | |
| Navara, David | 309095 | 1985-03-27 | Prague | | 2002 | Czech Republic | M | |
| Nedev, Trajko | 15000605 | 1973-02-27 | | | 2001 | North Macedonia | M | |
| Neelotpal, Das | 5003512 | 1982-04-20 | Kolkata | | 2006 | India | M | |
| Negi, Parimarjan | 5016690 | 1993-02-09 | New Delhi | | 2006 | India | M | |
| Nei, Iivo | 4500059 | 1931-10-31 | Tartu | 2026-07-06 | 2024 | Estonia | M | honorary |
| Neikšāns, Arturs | 11601388 | 1983-03-16 | Valka | | 2012 | Latvia | M | title application |
| Nemet, Ivan | 1301438 | 1943-04-14 | Sombor | 2007-12-16 | 1978 | Yugoslavia | M | later Switzerland |
| Nepomniachtchi, Ian | 4168119 | 1990-07-14 | Bryansk | | 2007 | Russia | M | title application |
| Nesterov, Arseniy | 24198455 | 2003-01-20 | | | 2020 | Russia | M | title application |
| Nesterov, Yakov | 13700030 | 1966-11-24 | Tselinograd | | 2005 | Kazakhstan | M | title application |
| Nestorović, Nikola | 934526 | 1989-10-13 | Belgrade | | 2016 | Serbia | M | title application |
| Neuman, Petr | 305243 | 1978-03-11 | Rakovník | 2025-04-29 | 2013 | Czech Republic | M | title application |
| Nevednichy, Vladislav | 1205730 | 1969-09-03 | | | 1993 | Romania | M | |
| Neverov, Valeriy | 14100150 | 1964-06-21 | Kharkiv | | 1991 | Ukraine | M | |
| Nevostrujev, Vladimir | 4114345 | 1966-05-25 | Novokuznetsk | | 2003 | Russia | M | |
| Nguyễn Anh Dũng | 12400025 | 1976-03-17 | | | 2001 | Vietnam | M | |
| Nguyễn Anh Khôi | 12404675 | 2002-01-11 | | | 2019 | Vietnam | M | title application |
| Nguyễn Đức Hòa | 12401358 | 1989-07-13 | | | 2014 | Vietnam | M | title application |
| Nguyễn Huỳnh Minh Huy | 12401269 | 1987-10-11 | Đồng Tháp province | | 2014 | Vietnam | M | title application |
| Nguyễn Ngọc Trường Sơn | 12401110 | 1990-02-23 | Rạch Giá | | 2005 | Vietnam | M | |
| Nguyễn Thái Đai Vân | 358878 | 2001-12-12 | | | 2018 | Czech Republic | M | title application |
| Nguyễn Văn Huy | 12401064 | 1985-03-14 | | | 2020 | Vietnam | M | title application |
| Ni Hua | 8601160 | 1983-05-31 | Shanghai | | 2003 | China | M | |
| Nielsen, Peter Heine | 1400355 | 1973-05-24 | Holstebro | | 1994 | Denmark | M | |
| Niemann, Hans Moke | 2093596 | 2003-06-20 | California | | 2021 | United States | M | title application |
| Nigmatov, Ortik | 14202131 | 2000 | | | 2023 | Uzbekistan | M | title application |
| Nijboer, Friso | 1000063 | 1965-05-26 | Nijmegen | | 1993 | Netherlands | M | |
| Nikčević, Nebojša | 901776 | 1965-02-20 | | | 1997 | Yugoslavia (S&M) | M | currently Montenegro |
| Nikitenko, Mihail | 13506862 | 2000-03-28 | Minsk | | 2022 | Belarus | M | title application; IM title application |
| Nikitin, Andrey | 4119568 | 1974-08-10 | | | 2001 | Russia | M | |
| Nikolac, Juraj | 14500140 | 1932-04-22 | Metković | | 1979 | Yugoslavia | M | currently Croatia |
| Nikolaidis, Ioannis | 4202139 | 1971-01-04 | | | 1995 | Greece | M | |
| Nikolenko, Oleg | 4101880 | 1959-06-19 | Moscow | | 2008 | Russia | M | title application |
| Nikolić, Predrag | 14400014 | 1960-09-11 | Šamac | | 1983 | Yugoslavia | M | currently Bosnia and Herzegovina |
| Nikolić, Stanimir | 903191 | 1935-01-26 | Donja Trepča | 2021-05 | 1978 | Yugoslavia | M | later Serbia |
| Nikolov, Momchil | 2905710 | 1985-03-03 | Dobrich | | 2010 | Bulgaria | M | title application |
| Ninov, Nikolai | 2900424 | 1969-05-21 | Pazardzhik | | 2012 | Bulgaria | M | title application |
| Nisipeanu, Liviu-Dieter | 1202758 | 1976-08-01 | Brașov | | 1997 | Romania | M | later Germany, currently Romania |
| Noe, Christopher | 24692018 | 1996-04-27 | Sinsheim | | 2025 | Germany | M | GM title application; IM title application |
| Nogerbek, Kazybek | 13710427 | 2004-05-13 | Astana | | 2024 | Kazakhstan | M | winner 2024 World Junior Chess Championship |
| Nogueiras Santiago, Jesús | 3500020 | 1959-07-17 | Remedios | | 1979 | Cuba | M | |
| Norwood, David R. | 400106 | 1968-10-03 | Farnworth | | 1989 | England | M | currently Andorra |
| Nosenko, Alexander | 14100690 | 1968-01-13 | | 2017-02-04 | 2014 | Ukraine | M | title application (Note: Ukrainian Chess Federation news archive, 4 February 2017. Death reported on this date.) |
| Notkevich, Benjamin Arvola | 1506536 | 1993-02-09 | Oslo | | 2018 | Norway | M | title application |
| Novik, Maxim | 4102924 | 1970-04-03 | Leningrad | | 2003 | Russia | M | title application; currently Lithuania |
| Novikov, Igor | 14100037 | 1962-05-23 | Kharkov | | 1990 | Ukraine | M | currently United States |
| Novikov, Maxim | 4161289 | 1972-05-02 | Klimovsk | | 2005 | Russia | M | title application |
| Novikov, Stanislav | 4125371 | 1985-07-06 | Moscow | | 2004 | Russia | M | title application |
| Nunn, John D. M. | 400017 | 1955-04-25 | London | | 1978 | England | M | |
| Nybäck, Tomi | 503142 | 1985-04-03 | Järvenpää | | 2003 | Finland | M | |
| Nyzhnyk, Illya | 14118084 | 1996-09-27 | Vinnytsia | | 2011 | Ukraine | M | title application |
| Obregón, Andrés Carlos | 111724 | 1986-10-22 | Buenos Aires | | 2014 | Argentina | M | title application |
| Obregon Rivero, Juan Carlos | 3507815 | 1989-09-08 | Las Tunas | | 2020 | Cuba | M | title application; currently Mexico |
| Obukhov, Alexander | 4108442 | 1969-04-17 | | | 2005 | Russia | M | |
| Odeev, Handszar | 14000091 | 1972-01-27 | Moscow | | 2004 | Turkmenistan | M | |
| Øgaard, Leif | 1500074 | 1952-01-05 | | | 2007 | Norway | M | title application |
| Ohanyan, Emin | 13312022 | 2006-09-20 | | | 2023 | Armenia | M | title application |
| O'Kelly de Galway, Albéric | | 1911-05-17 | Brussels | 1980-10-03 | 1956 | Belgium | M | Gaige |
| Okhotnik, Vladimir | 14101289 | 1950-02-28 | Kyiv | | 2011 | France | M | winner 21st World Senior Chess Championship (Note: Di Felice records Okhotnik as a GM in 2006, but FIDE ratings lists show him as an IM until November 2011. In fact Okhotnik earned the GM title by winning the 21st World Senior Championship in November 2011.) |
| Ólafsson, Friðrik | 2300052 | 1935-01-26 | Reykjavík | 2025-04-04 | 1958 | Iceland | M | |
| Ólafsson, Helgi | 2300010 | 1956-08-15 | Reykjavík | | 1985 | Iceland | M | |
| Oleksiyenko, Mykhaylo | 4152417 | 1986-09-30 | Lviv | | 2005 | Ukraine | M | title application |
| Oliva Castañeda, Kevel | 3500799 | 1994-05-04 | Matanzas | | 2017 | Cuba | M | title application |
| Oll, Lembit | | 1966-04-23 | Kohtla-Järve | 1999-05-17 | 1990 | Soviet Union | M | (Note: Di Felice gives Oll's title year as 1992, but FIDE Golden Book and other sources have 1990. Oll was assigned FIDE ID 4500024 in the July 1998 and Jan 1999 rating lists, but this number was reassigned later to Ladva.) later Estonia |
| Olszewski, Michał | 1121251 | 1989-09-23 | Warsaw | | 2009 | Poland | M | title application |
| Omelja, Artem | 14119846 | 1991-10-18 | | | 2020 | Ukraine | M | title application |
| Oms Pallise, Josep | 2205521 | 1973-07-20 | Vallfogona de Balaguer | | 2007 | Andorra | M | title application; currently Spain |
| Onischuk, Alexander | 14101025 | 1975-09-03 | Simferopol | | 1994 | Ukraine | M | currently United States |
| Onyshchuk, Volodymyr | 14114038 | 1991-07-21 | Ivano-Frankivsk | | 2012 | Ukraine | M | title application |
| Oparin, Grigoriy | 24125890 | 1997-07-01 | Munich | | 2013 | Russia | M | title application; currently United States |
| Oral, Tomáš | 303739 | 1977-12-24 | Olomouc | | 1999 | Czech Republic | M | |
| Oratovsky, Michael | 2802090 | 1974-04-03 | | | 2002 | Israel | M | |
| Orlov, Andrey | 4125282 | 1977-03-19 | Leningrad | | 2008 | Russia | M | title application |
| Oro, Faustino | 20000197 | 2013 | | | 2026 | Argentina | M | GM title application |
| Ortega, Lexy | 811416 | 1960-03-08 | Camagüey | | 2001 | Italy | M | |
| Ortiz Suárez, Isan Reynaldo | 3507165 | 1985-04-02 | Guantánamo | | 2011 | Cuba | M | title application (Note: The Ortiz Suárez GM title application lists his birthday as 30 March 1980, but Di Felice has 2 April 1985 and the Ortiz Suarez FIDE Chess Profile also lists his birth year as 1985.) |
| Ostenstad, Berge | 1500058 | 1964-09-15 | Asker | | 2003 | Norway | M | |
| Ostojić, Predrag | | 1938-02-22 | Kraljevo | 1996-07-05 | 1975 | Yugoslavia | M | |
| Ovetchkin, Roman | 4119991 | 1973-01-16 | | | 2005 | Russia | M | |
| Ovsejevitsch, Sergei | 14101866 | 1977-05-04 | | | 2000 | Ukraine | M | (Note: FIDE gives Ovsejevitsch's birth year as 1977, but Di Felice says his birthday is 4 May 1974 because of an error in a previous version of the FIDE database.) |
| Pacher, Milan | 14907445 | 1990-10-03 | Bratislava | | 2016 | Slovakia | M | title application |
| Pachman, Luděk | 4662989 | 1924-05-11 | Bělá pod Bezdězem | 2003-03-06 | 1954 | Czechoslovakia | M | later West Germany, Germany |
| Padevsky, Nikola | 2900190 | 1933-05-29 | Plovdiv | 2023-12-17 | 1964 | Bulgaria | M | Gaige |
| Pähtz, Elisabeth | 4641833 | 1985-01-08 | Erfurt | | 2022 | Germany | F | title application; decision at FIDE council meeting, Nov 2022 |
| Pähtz, Thomas | 4611349 | 1956-09-04 | Erfurt | | 1990 | Germany | M | (Note: Di Felice lists 1992 as Thomas Pähtz GM title year, but the correct year is 1990 as given in the FIDE Golden Book.) |
| Paichadze, Luka | 13602934 | 1991-03-06 | Georgia | | 2012 | Georgia | M | title application |
| Pakleza, Zbigniew | 1119290 | 1986-12-05 | Gliwice | | 2014 | Poland | M | title application (Note: Di Felice gives Paleza's birthday as 5 December 1986, but his GM title application says 8 December.) |
| Palac, Mladen | 14500116 | 1971-02-18 | Donji Mamići | | 1993 | Croatia | M | |
| Palatnik, Semon | 2014610 | 1950-03-26 | Odesa | | 1978 | Soviet Union | M | currently United States |
| Palo, Davor | 1405853 | 1985-11-02 | Sarajevo | | 2005 | Denmark | M | title application |
| Panarin, Mikhail | 4153251 | 1983-08-04 | Rostov-on-Don | | 2007 | Russia | M | title application |
| Panchanathan, Magesh Chandran | 5007429 | 1983-08-10 | Madurai | | 2006 | India | M | |
| Panchenko, Alexander | 4102126 | 1953-10-05 | Chelyabinsk | 2009-05-19 | 1980 | Soviet Union | M | later Russia |
| Pang, Tao | 8609950 | 2001-02-20 | Qingdao | | 2025 | China | M | GM title application; IM title application |
| Panno, Óscar | 100153 | 1935-03-17 | Buenos Aires | | 1955 | Argentina | M | Gaige |
| Pantsulaia, Levan | 13602071 | 1986-02-26 | Tbilisi | | 2005 | Georgia | M | |
| Paoli, Enrico | 1306855 | 1908-01-13 | Trieste | 2005-12-15 | 1996 | Italy | M | honorary |
| Pap, Gyula | 725323 | 1991-04-20 | Szekszárd | | 2011 | Hungary | M | title application |
| Pap, Miša | 921610 | 1979-05-01 | Novi Sad | | 2011 | Serbia | M | title application |
| Papadopoulos, Ioannis K. | 4207742 | 1988-04-12 | | | 2009 | Greece | M | title application |
| Papaioannou, Ioannis | 4201345 | 1976-04-20 | | | 1998 | Greece | M | |
| Papin, Vasily | 4143183 | 1988-09-21 | Moscow | | 2011 | Russia | M | title application |
| Papp, Gábor | 718602 | 1987-05-04 | Pécs | | 2011 | Hungary | M | title application |
| Paragua, Mark | 5201241 | 1984-03-29 | | | 2005 | Philippines | M | title application |
| Paravyan, David | 4194985 | 1998-03-08 | Moscow | | 2017 | Russia | M | title application (Note: Paravyan's GM title application lists his birthday as 3 August 1998, but Di Felice, his IM title application and other sources give 8 March 1998.) |
| Parker, Jonathan F. | 400580 | 1976-05-19 | | | 2001 | England | M | |
| Parkhov, Yair | 2813408 | 2002-11-24 | | | 2024 | Israel | M | title application; IM title application |
| Pârligras, Mircea-Emilian | 1204297 | 1980-12-28 | | | 2002 | Romania | M | |
| Parma, Bruno | 14600706 | 1941-12-30 | Ljubljana | 2026-02-06 | 1963 | Yugoslavia | M | later Slovenia |
| Pashikian, Arman | 13301578 | 1987-07-28 | Irkutsk | | 2007 | Armenia | M | title application |
| Paunović, Dragan | 900516 | 1961-11-08 | Belgrade (Zemun) | 2016-05-19 | 2007 | Serbia | M | title application |
| Pavasovič, Duško | 14600986 | 1976-10-15 | Split | | 1999 | Slovenia | M | |
| Pavlidis, Antonios | 4212312 | 1993-04-01 | | | 2014 | Greece | M | title application |
| Pavlov, Maxim | 14104350 | 1979-06-13 | | | 2014 | Ukraine | M | title application; currently Russia |
| Pavlović, Miloš | 900389 | 1964-01-05 | Belgrade | | 1993 | Yugoslavia (S&M) | M | currently Serbia |
| Pecháč, Jerguš | 14926970 | 2001-10-31 | Žilina | | 2019 | Slovakia | M | title application |
| Pelletier, Yannick | 1301837 | 1976-09-22 | Biel | | 2001 | Switzerland | M | |
| Pena Gomez, Manuel | 2252813 | 1988-06-13 | Vigo | | 2019 | Spain | M | title application |
| Peng, Li Min | 14112620 | 1997-01-15 | | | 2022 | Ukraine | M | title application; Di Felice; currently Switzerland |
| Peng Xiaomin | 8600511 | 1973-04-08 | | | 1996 | China | M | |
| Peng Xiongjian | 8610550 | 2000-05 | Panzhihua | | 2023 | China | M | title application |
| Peng Zhaoqin | 1004786 | 1968-05-08 | Guangzhou | | 2004 | Netherlands | F | |
| Penrose, Jonathan | 400360 | 1933-10-07 | Colchester | 2021-11-30 | 1993 | England | M | honorary |
| Peralta, Fernando | 105309 | 1979-12-16 | Lomas de Zamora | | 2004 | Argentina | M | |
| Perelshteyn, Eugene | 2012529 | 1980-06-15 | Zhitomir | | 2006 | United States | M | (Note: Di Felice lists Perelshteyn's birthday as 15 June 1980, but many online sources have 2 February 1980.) |
| Pérez Candelario, Manuel | 2210622 | 1983-05-25 | Zafra | | 2011 | Spain | M | title application |
| Pérez Mitjans, Orelvis | 3502856 | 1976-07-28 | Havana | | 2012 | Spain | M | title application |
| Pérez Ponsa, Federico | 117927 | 1993-10-22 | Zarate | | 2012 | Argentina | M | title application |
| Pérez Rodriguez, Luís Manuel | 3503364 | 1978-10-05 | Holguín | | 2008 | Cuba | M | title application |
| Pert, Nicholas | 403989 | 1981-01-22 | Ipswich | | 2004 | England | M | |
| Perunović, Miloš | 921629 | 1984-01-14 | Belgrade | | 2004 | Serbia and Montenegro | M | title application; currently Serbia |
| Petkevich, Jusefs | 11600110 | 1940-12-19 | Riga | 2024-05-01 | 2002 | Latvia | M | |
| Petkov, Momchil | 2921642 | 2005-11-11 | Dobrich | | 2022 | Bulgaria | M | title application; IM title application |
| Petkov, Vladimir | 2901188 | 1971-01-26 | Vidin | | 2007 | Bulgaria | M | title application |
| Petr, Martin | 318299 | 1988-08-23 | Broumov | | 2011 | Czech Republic | M | title application |
| Petriashvili, Nikoloz | 13611216 | 2002-07-16 | | | 2026 | Georgia | M | GM title application; IM title application |
| Petřík, Tomáš | 14901625 | 1980-10-31 | Modra | | 2008 | Slovakia | M | title application |
| Petrosian, Arshak B. | 13300288 | 1953-12-16 | Yerevan | | 1984 | Armenia | M | |
| Petrosian, Davit G. | 13301349 | 1984-09-20 | Yerevan | | 2009 | Armenia | M | title application |
| Petrosian, Tigran | | 1929-06-17 | Tbilisi | 1984-08-13 | 1952 | Soviet Union | M | Gaige |
| Petrosian, Tigran L. | 13301616 | 1984-09-17 | Yerevan | | 2004 | Armenia | M | |
| Petrosyan, Manuel | 13300857 | 1998-05-06 | | | 2017 | Armenia | M | title application (Note: Manual Petrosyan's GM title application gives his birthday as 6 May 1998, but Di Felice has 15 May.) |
| Petrov, Marian | 2901773 | 1975-09-14 | Veliko Tarnovo | | 2010 | Bulgaria | M | title application |
| Petrov, Martin | 2911086 | 2000-10-03 | Sofia | | 2022 | Bulgaria | M | title application; IM title application |
| Petrov, Nikita | 4101286 | 1996-07-01 | Novorossiysk | | 2018 | Russia | M | title application; currently Montenegro |
| Pétursson, Margeir | 2300028 | 1960-02-15 | Reykjavík | | 1986 | Iceland | M | |
| Pfleger, Helmut | 4600100 | 1943-08-06 | Teplice-Šanov | | 1975 | West Germany | M | currently Germany |
| Pichot, Alan | 110973 | 1998-08-13 | Buenos Aires | | 2016 | Argentina | M | title application; currently Spain |
| Pietzsch, Wolfgang | | 1930-12-21 | Wittgendorf | 1996-12-29 | 1965 | East Germany | M | (Note: Di Felice gives Pietzsch's title year as 1966, but both Gaige and the FIDE Golden Book give 1965.) later Germany |
| Pigusov, Evgeny | 4100514 | 1961-03-31 | Kemerovo | | 1987 | Russia | M | |
| Pijpers, Arthur | 1019554 | 1994-05-19 | Zoetermeer | | 2025 | Netherlands | M | GM title application; IM title application |
| Piket, Jeroen | 1000055 | 1969-01-27 | Leiden | | 1989 | Netherlands | M | |
| Pikula, Dejan | 906379 | 1969-07-31 | | | 2002 | Yugoslavia (S&M) | M | currently Serbia |
| Pilavov, Georgy | 14109158 | 1974-12-13 | Luhansk | | 2005 | Ukraine | M | title application; currently Russia |
| Pilnik, Herman | | 1914-01-08 | Stuttgart | 1981-11-12 | 1952 | Argentina | M | Gaige; also Hermann Pilnik |
| Pintér, József | 700045 | 1953-11-09 | Budapest | | 1982 | Hungary | M | |
| Piorun, Kacper | 1130420 | 1991-11-24 | Łowicz | | 2012 | Poland | M | title application |
| Pirc, Vasja | | 1907-12-19 | Idrija | 1980-06-02 | 1953 | Yugoslavia | M | Gaige |
| Piskov, Yury | 4101731 | 1964-10-17 | Moscow | | 1993 | Russia | M | |
| Plachetka, Ján | 14900068 | 1945-02-18 | Trenčín | 2026-05-24 | 1978 | Czechoslovakia | M | later Slovakia |
| Planinec, Albin | 14600730 | 1944-04-18 | Briše | 2008-12-20 | 1972 | Yugoslavia | M | later Slovenia; also Planinc |
| Plaskett, H. James | 400238 | 1960-03-18 | Dhekelia Cantonment | | 1985 | England | M | |
| Plát, Vojtěch | 325740 | 1994-01-23 | | | 2017 | Czech Republic | M | title application; currently Slovakia |
| Podolchenko, Evgeniy | 13504134 | 1988-02-07 | Salihorsk | | 2010 | Belarus | M | title application (Note: Di Felice gives Podochenko's birthday as 2 July 1988, but his GM title application has 7 Feb 1988.); currently Serbia |
| Poetsch, Hagen | 24615137 | 1991-08-27 | Salihorsk | | 2018 | Germany | M | title application |
| Pogorelov, Ruslan | 14100363 | 1959-06-07 | | | 1998 | Ukraine | M | currently Spain |
| Polák, Tomáš | 300560 | 1974-04-24 | Brno | | 2000 | Czech Republic | M | |
| Polgar, Judit | 700070 | 1976-07-23 | Budapest | | 1992 | Hungary | F | FIDE Golden Book |
| Polgar, Susan | 700088 | 1969-04-19 | Budapest | | 1991 | Hungary | F | also Zsuzsanna; later United States; currently Hungary |
| Polugaevsky, Lev | | 1934-11-20 | Mogilev | 1995-08-30 | 1962 | Soviet Union | M | later Russia |
| Poluljahov, Aleksandr | 4112849 | 1965-06-06 | | | 1993 | Russia | M | |
| Polzin, Rainer | 4610741 | 1971-02-13 | | | 2007 | Germany | M | title application |
| Pomar, Arturo | 2200449 | 1931-09-01 | Palma de Mallorca | 2016-05-26 | 1962 | Spain | M | |
| Ponkratov, Pavel | 4157800 | 1988-07-15 | Chelyabinsk | | 2010 | Russia | M | title application |
| Ponomariov, Ruslan | 14103320 | 1983-10-11 | Horlivka | | 1998 | Ukraine | M | |
| Popchev, Milko | 2900165 | 1964-11-11 | Plovdiv | | 1998 | Bulgaria | M | |
| Popilski, Gil | 2809060 | 1993-10-06 | | | 2013 | Israel | M | title application |
| Popov, Ivan | 4170350 | 1990-03-20 | Rostov-on-Don | | 2007 | Russia | M | title application |
| Popov, Valerij | 4119410 | 1974-09-10 | Leningrad | | 1999 | Russia | M | |
| Popović, Dušan | 927031 | 1983-02-28 | Sombor | | 2007 | Serbia | M | title application |
| Popović, Petar | 900109 | 1959-02-14 | Orlovat | | 1981 | Yugoslavia | M | currently Serbia |
| Portisch, Lajos | 700037 | 1937-04-04 | Zalaegerszeg | | 1961 | Hungary | M | Gaige |
| Postny, Evgeny | 2804344 | 1981-07-03 | | | 2002 | Israel | M | |
| Potapov, Alexander | 4115074 | 1969-01-05 | | | 2004 | Russia | M | |
| Potapov, Pavel | 4169786 | 1990-09-28 | Korkino | | 2016 | Russia | M | title application |
| Potkin, Vladimir | 4131061 | 1982-06-28 | Rybinsk | | 2001 | Russia | M | |
| Pourramezanali, Amirreza | 12511412 | 1992-09-23 | Rasht | | 2016 | Iran | M | title application |
| Pozo Vera, Sandro | 3507203 | 1987-07-27 | Santa Clara | | 2012 | Cuba | M | title application |
| Pranav, V | 25060783 | 2006-10-13 | Bengaluru | | 2022 | India | M | title application |
| Pranesh M | 35028600 | 2006-08-26 | Karaikudi | | 2023 | India | M | title application; IM title application |
| Predke, Alexandr | 24107581 | 1994-01-05 | Dmitrovgrad | | 2016 | Russia | M | title application; currently Serbia |
| Predojević, Borki | 930849 | 1987-04-06 | Teslić | | 2005 | Bosnia and Herzegovina | M | title application |
| Preotu, Razvan | 2613280 | 1999-08-11 | Toronto | | 2016 | Canada | M | title application |
| Priasmoro, Novendra | 7105029 | 1999-11-24 | Jakarta | | 2020 | Indonesia | M | title application |
| Pridorozhni, Aleksei | 4127870 | 1981-08-27 | Surgut | | 2011 | Russia | M | title application |
| Prié, Éric | 600172 | 1962-03-14 | Paris | | 1995 | France | M | |
| Prins, Lodewijk | 1001566 | 1913-01-27 | Amsterdam | 1999-11-11 | 1982 | Netherlands | M | honorary |
| Prohászka, Péter | 726265 | 1992-01-13 | Vác | | 2010 | Hungary | M | title application |
| Prokopchuk, Evgeny | 4120965 | 1978-07-13 | Tyumen | | 2001 | Russia | M | |
| Prraneeth Vuppala | 46622373 | 2007-01-02 | Alagadapa | | 2023 | India | M | title application; IM title application |
| Pruijssers, Roeland | 1013068 | 1989-08-16 | Hendrik-Ido-Ambacht | | 2012 | Netherlands | M | title application |
| Prusikin, Michael | 4642325 | 1978-01-19 | Kharkov | | 2004 | Germany | M | |
| Psakhis, Lev | 2800012 | 1958-11-29 | Kalinin | | 1982 | Soviet Union | M | currently Israel |
| Puc, Stojan | 14600838 | 1921-04-09 | Novo Mesto | 2004-01-29 | 1984 | Yugoslavia | M | honorary; later Slovenia |
| Pultinevicius, Paulius | 12809390 | 2001-11-24 | | | 2019 | Lithuania | M | title application |
| Puranik, Abhimanyu | 5061245 | 2000-02-11 | Mumbai | | 2017 | India | M | title application |
| Pushkov, Nikolai | 4117131 | 1946-11-28 | Tambov | | 1994 | Russia | M | |
| Putnam, Liam | 30938279 | 2008 | | | 2026 | United States | M | GM title application; IM title application |
| Qashashvili, Alexandre | 13600842 | 1975-09-02 | | | 2017 | Georgia | M | title application |
| Quesada Pérez, Luis Ernesto | 3520773 | 1999-01-04 | Ciego de Ávila | | 2018 | Cuba | M | title application; currently Mexico |
| Quesada Pérez, Yasser | 3509362 | 1992-05-23 | Villa Clara Province | | 2017 | Cuba | M | title application |
| Quesada Pérez, Yuniesky | 3504409 | 1984-07-31 | Santa Clara | | 2005 | Cuba | M | currently United States |
| Quinteros, Miguel A. | 100021 | 1947-12-28 | Buenos Aires | | 1973 | Argentina | M | |
| Quintiliano, Renato R. | 2117568 | 1992-10-04 | São Paulo | | 2022 | Brazil | M | title application; IM title application |
| Quizon, Daniel | 5217911 | 2004-10-11 | Rizal, Philippines | | 2024 | Philippines | M | title application |
| Quparadze, Giga | 13602250 | 1987-08-23 | Kutaisi | | 2017 | Georgia | M | title application |
| Raahul V S | 25035525 | 2003 | | | 2025 | India | M | IM title application; winner 6th ASEAN Individual Open Chess Championship |
| Rabiega, Robert | 4601475 | 1971-02-01 | Berlin | | 2002 | Germany | M | |
| Radjabov, Teimour | 13400924 | 1987-03-12 | Baku | | 2001 | Azerbaijan | M | |
| Radulov, Ivan | 2900300 | 1939-01-07 | Burgas | | 1972 | Bulgaria | M | |
| Radulski, Julian | 2901595 | 1972-05-24 | Plovdiv | 2013-02-16 | 2004 | Bulgaria | M | title application |
| Raetsky, Alexander | 4103203 | 1961-10-17 | Voronezh | | 2005 | Russia | M | title application |
| Ragger, Markus | 1610856 | 1988-02-05 | Klagenfurt | | 2008 | Austria | M | title application |
| Ragozin, Viacheslav | | 1908-10-08 | Saint Petersburg | 1962-03-11 | 1950 | Soviet Union | M | Gaige |
| Rahman, Ziaur | 10200037 | 1974-05-01 | | 2024-07-05 | 2002 | Bangladesh | M | |
| Rahul Srivatshav P | 25059653 | 2002-12-29 | Guntur | | 2022 | India | M | title application; IM title application |
| Raičević, Vladimir | 900605 | 1949-05-02 | Travnik | | 1976 | Yugoslavia | M | later Serbia and Montenegro; currently Serbia |
| Raja, Harshit | 5089000 | 2001-04-03 | Pune | | 2022 | India | M | title application |
| Raja Rithvik R | 35007394 | 2004-05-04 | Hyderabad | | 2022 | India | M | title application; IM title application |
| Rajković, Dušan | 900265 | 1942-06-17 | Kruševac | | 1977 | Yugoslavia | M | currently Serbia |
| Ratković, Milovan | 914525 | 1994-11-20 | Pančevo | | 2026 | Serbia | M | GM title application; IM title application |
| Rajpara, Ankit | 5023335 | 1994-08-27 | Ahmedabad | | 2014 | India | M | title application |
| Rakhmanov, Aleksandr | 4173708 | 1989-08-28 | Cherepovets | | 2007 | Russia | M | title application |
| Rambaldi, Francesco | 20657307 | 1999-01-19 | Milan | | 2015 | Italy | M | title application |
| Ramesh R. B. | 5002109 | 1976-04-20 | Chennai | | 2003 | India | M | |
| Rameshbabu, Praggnanandhaa | 25059530 | 2005-08-10 | Chennai | | 2018 | India | M | title application |
| Rameshbabu, Vaishali | 5091756 | 2001-06-21 | Chennai | | 2024 | India | F | title application |
| Ramírez, Alejandro | 6500617 | 1988-06-21 | San José, Costa Rica | | 2004 | Costa Rica | M | currently United States |
| Rantanen, Yrjö | 500038 | 1950-04-23 | Tampere | 2021-01-14 | 1981 | Finland | M | |
| Rapport, Richárd | 738590 | 1996-03-25 | Szombathely | | 2010 | Hungary | M | title application; later Romania, currently Hungary |
| Rashkovsky, Nukhim N. | 4100603 | 1946-04-18 | Sverdlovsk | 2023-03-14 | 1980 | Soviet Union | M | later Russia |
| Rašík, Vitězslav | 300306 | 1973-11-07 | | | 2017 | Czech Republic | M | title application |
| Rasmussen, Allan Stig | 1406000 | 1983-11-20 | Læsø | | 2009 | Denmark | M | title application |
| Rasulov, Vugar | 13402390 | 1991-04-05 | Ganja | | 2011 | Azerbaijan | M | title application |
| Ratković, Miloje | 914517 | 1996-04-05 | Pančevo | | 2021 | Serbia | M | title application |
| Raznikov, Danny | 2811154 | 1993-03-29 | Israel | | 2015 | Israel | M | title application |
| Razuvaev, Yuri | 4100301 | 1945-10-10 | Moscow | 2012-03-21 | 1976 | Soviet Union | M | later Russia |
| Rechlis, Gad | 2800047 | 1967-02-05 | | | 1990 | Israel | M | |
| Ree, Hans | 1000098 | 1944-09-15 | Amsterdam | | 1980 | Netherlands | M | |
| Reefat, Bin-Sattar | 10200207 | 1974-07-25 | Barguna | | 2006 | Bangladesh | M | title application |
| Reinderman, Dimitri | 1001302 | 1972-08-12 | Hoorn | | 1998 | Netherlands | M | |
| Relange, Éloi | 600822 | 1976-07-01 | | | 1998 | France | M | |
| Renet, Olivier | 600040 | 1964-12-21 | Paris | | 1990 | France | M | |
| Repka, Christopher | 14918781 | 1998-10-06 | Stará Ľubovňa | | 2018 | Slovakia | M | title application |
| Reshevsky, Samuel | | 1911-11-26 | Ozorków | 1992-04-04 | 1950 | United States | M | |
| Riazantsev, Alexander | 4125029 | 1985-09-12 | Moscow | | 2001 | Russia | M | |
| Ribli, Zoltán | 700010 | 1951-09-06 | Mohács | | 1973 | Hungary | M | |
| Ricardi, Pablo | 100242 | 1962-02-25 | Buenos Aires | | 1997 | Argentina | M | |
| Richter, Michael | 4618920 | 1978-07-20 | Berlin | | 2015 | Germany | M | title application |
| Riff, Jean-Noël | 611190 | 1981-04-22 | Mulhouse | | 2014 | France | M | title application (Note: Riff's GM title application lists his birthday as 29 April 1981, but Di Felice has 22 April as does Jean-Noël Riff[fr].) |
| Ringoir, Tanguy | 208027 | 1994-06-29 | Wetteren | | 2015 | Belgium | M | title application |
| Ríos Gomez, Cristhian Camilo | 4403940 | 1993-04-09 | Tuluá | | 2019 | Colombia | M | title application |
| Ristic, Nenad | 901318 | 1958-11-19 | Kragujevac | | 1997 | Yugoslavia (S&M) | M | currently Serbia |
| Rivas Pastor, Manuel | 2200058 | 1960-07-13 | Jaén | | 1987 | Spain | M | |
| Rizouk, Aimen | 7900309 | 1979-08-03 | Algiers | | 2007 | Algeria | M | title application |
| Robatsch, Karl | 1600052 | 1929-10-14 | Klagenfurt | 2000-09-19 | 1961 | Austria | M | |
| Robson, Ray | 2023970 | 1994-10-25 | Guam | | 2010 | United States | M | title application |
| Rodrigue-Lemieux, Shawn | 2620049 | 2004-03-22 | Montreal | | 2024 | Canada | M | title application |
| Rodríguez Céspedes, Amador | 3500039 | 1956-09-08 | San Germán, Cuba | | 1977 | Spain | M | |
| Rodríguez Guerrero, Enrique | 2216892 | 1983-11-08 | Granada | | 2007 | Spain | M | title application |
| Rodríguez Vargas, Orestes | 2203189 | 1943-07-04 | Lima | | 1978 | Peru | M | currently Spain |
| Rodríguez Vila, Andrés | 3000010 | 1973-12-19 | Montevideo | | 1997 | Uruguay | M | |
| Rodshtein, Maxim | 2806851 | 1989-01-19 | Leningrad | | 2007 | Israel | M | IM title application; title application |
| Roganović, Miloš | 937614 | 1991-12-23 | Vrbas | | 2017 | Serbia | M | title application |
| Rogers, Ian | 3200019 | 1960-06-24 | Hobart | | 1985 | Australia | M | |
| Rogić, Davor | 14501228 | 1971-07-27 | | | 2006 | Croatia | M | |
| Rogoff, Kenneth | 2000237 | 1953-03-22 | Rochester, New York | | 1978 | United States | M | |
| Rogovski, Vladimir | 14101378 | 1965-02-07 | | | 2005 | Ukraine | M | title application |
| Rogozenco, Dorian | 1210319 | 1973-08-18 | Kishinev | | 1995 | Moldova | M | currently Romania |
| Rohde, Michael | 2000172 | 1959-08-26 | New York City | | 1988 | United States | M | |
| Rohith Krishna S | 46617051 | 2005 | | | 2025 | India | M | GM title application |
| Roiz, Michael | 2804158 | 1983-10-12 | | | 2003 | Israel | M | |
| Romanenko, Vladimir | 13502921 | 1985-04-06 | Minsk | | 2011 | Belarus | M | title application (Note: Romanenko's GM title application gives his birthday as 4 June 1985, but Di Felice and other sources have 6 April.) |
| Romanishin, Oleg M. | 14100088 | 1952-01-10 | Lviv | | 1976 | Soviet Union | M | currently Ukraine |
| Romanov, Evgeny | 4148843 | 1988-11-02 | Kaliningrad | | 2007 | Russia | M | title application; later Norway, currently North Macedonia |
| Rombaldoni, Axel | 815837 | 1992-03-23 | Pesaro | | 2013 | Italy | M | title application |
| Romero Holmes, Alfonso | 2200066 | 1965-05-28 | Barcelona | | 1995 | Spain | M | |
| Rossetto, Héctor | 100935 | 1922-09-08 | Bahía Blanca | 2009-01-23 | 1960 | Argentina | M | |
| Rossolimo, Nicolas | | 1910-02-28 | Kyiv | 1975-07-24 | 1953 | United States | M | Gaige |
| Rotstein, Arkadij | 4662997 | 1961-04-29 | Lviv | | 1994 | Ukraine | M | currently Germany |
| Roussel-Roozmon, Thomas | 2603659 | 1988-01-08 | Laval | | 2010 | Canada | M | title application |
| Rowson, Jonathan | 2400561 | 1977-04-18 | Aberdeen | | 1999 | Scotland | M | |
| Saptarshi, Roy | 5008980 | 1986-03-21 | Kolkata | | 2018 | India | M | title application |
| Roy Chowdhury, Saptarshi | 5002974 | 1982-02-13 | Kolkata | | 2013 | India | M | title application |
| Royal, Shreyas | 448869 | 2009 | | | 2024 | England | M | title application |
| Rozen, Eytan | 2816750 | 2006 | | | 2026 | Israel | M | GM title application |
| Rozentalis, Eduardas | 12800023 | 1963-05-27 | Vilnius | | 1991 | Lithuania | M | |
| Rozum, Ivan | 24104272 | 1991-12-09 | Saint Petersburg | | 2014 | Russia | M | title application |
| Ruban, Vadim | 4100387 | 1964-06-13 | Novosibirsk | | 1991 | Russia | M | |
| Rubinstein, Akiba | | 1880-12-01 | Stawiski | 1961-03-15 | 1950 | Poland | M | (Note: For many years it was believed that Rubinstein was born on 12 Oct 1882, but more recent research has shown that 1 Dec 1880, the birth date on Rubinstein's gravestone, is correct. Rubinstein's DOB, Chess History & Literature Society, 19 Apr 2014) |
| Rublevsky, Sergei | 4115309 | 1974-10-15 | Kurgan | | 1994 | Russia | M | |
| Ruiz Castillo, Joshua Daniel | 4400704 | 1997-07-08 | Bogotá | | 2019 | Colombia | M | title application |
| Ruck, Róbert | 705713 | 1977-12-10 | | | 2000 | Hungary | M | |
| Rusev, Krasimir | 2905434 | 1983-10-16 | Dimitrovgrad, Bulgaria | | 2008 | Bulgaria | M | title application |
| Rustemov, Alexander | 4119002 | 1973-07-06 | Murmansk | | 1998 | Russia | M | |
| Ruželė, Darius | 12800104 | 1968-04-27 | | | 1996 | Lithuania | M | |
| Rychagov, Andrey | 4119932 | 1979-08-03 | Moscow | | 2006 | Russia | M | title application |
| Rychagov, Mikhail | 4500040 | 1967-11-12 | Tallinn | | 1997 | Estonia | M | also Rytshagov |
| Sadhwani, Raunak | 35093487 | 2005-12-22 | Nagpur | | 2020 | India | M | title application |
| Sadler, Matthew D. | 400173 | 1974-05-15 | Chatham | | 1993 | England | M | |
| Sadikhov, Ulvi | 13401416 | 1998-11-23 | Azerbaijan | | 2019 | Azerbaijan | M | title application |
| Sadorra, Julio Catalino | 5201268 | 1986-09-14 | Quezon City | | 2011 | Philippines | M | title application |
| Sadvakasov, Darmen | 13700464 | 1979-04-28 | Astana | | 1999 | Kazakhstan | M | |
| Sadzikowski, Daniel | 1132253 | 1994-01-20 | Chrzanów | | 2017 | Poland | M | title application |
| Safarli, Eltaj | 13402129 | 1992-05-18 | Baku | | 2008 | Azerbaijan | M | title application |
| Safin, Shukhrat | 14200147 | 1970-04-03 | Samarkand | 2009-09-20 | 1999 | Uzbekistan | M | |
| Sagalchik, Gennadij | 2007916 | 1969-04-22 | | | 1994 | United States | M | |
| Šahović, Dragutin | 901644 | 1940-08-08 | Kraljevo | 2005-11-12 | 1978 | Yugoslavia | M | (Note: Šahović was assigned FIDE ID 901644, but after his death that ID was given to a different player.) later Serbia and Montenegro |
| Šajtar, Jaroslav | | 1921-12-03 | Ostrava | 2003-02-04 | 1985 | Czechoslovakia | M | honorary |
| Sakaev, Konstantin | 4104226 | 1974-04-13 | Leningrad | | 1993 | Russia | M | |
| Saleh, Salem A. R. | 9301348 | 1993-01-04 | Sharjah | | 2009 | United Arab Emirates | M | title application |
| Salgado López, Iván | 2257327 | 1991-06-29 | Ourense | | 2008 | Spain | M | title application |
| Salinas Herrera, Pablo | 3407128 | 1994-06-03 | Concepción | | 2019 | Chile | M | title application |
| Salomon, Johan | 1509500 | 1997-05-07 | Oslo | | 2017 | Norway | M | title application |
| Salov, Valery | 4100069 | 1964-05-26 | Wrocław | | 1986 | Soviet Union | M | currently Russia |
| Saltaev, Mihail | 14200058 | 1962-11-19 | | | 1995 | Uzbekistan | M | |
| Salvador, Roland | 5201047 | 1982-01-03 | Manila | | 2010 | Philippines | M | title application |
| Samant, Aditya | 35080580 | 2006-09-09 | | | 2023 | India | M | title application AICF |
| Sambuev, Bator | 4128290 | 1980-11-25 | Ulan-Ude | | 2006 | Russia | M | title application; currently Canada |
| Sämisch, Friedrich | | 1896-09-20 | Berlin | 1975-08-16 | 1950 | West Germany | M | |
| Samunenkov, Ihor | 14187086 | 2009-06-15 | Kyiv | | 2023 | Ukraine | M | title application |
| San Segundo Carrillo, Pablo | 2200082 | 1970-02-09 | Madrid | | 1995 | Spain | M | |
| Şanal, Vahap | 6300545 | 1998-05-26 | İzmir | | 2016 | Turkey | M | title application |
| Sánchez, Joseph | 5201233 | 1970-08-19 | Cebu City | | 2009 | Philippines | M | title application |
| Sănduleac, Vasile | 13900161 | 1971-01-02 | Bălți | | 2006 | Moldova | M | |
| Sanguineti, Raúl | 100030 | 1933-02-03 | Paraná, Buenos Aires | 2000-08-06 | 1982 | Argentina | M | honorary |
| Sanikidze, Tornike | 13602608 | 1989-01-01 | Tbilisi | | 2008 | Georgia | M | title application |
| Santiago, Yago De Moura | 2103877 | 1992-04-17 | Recife | | 2017 | Brazil | M | title application (Note: Di Felice gives 18 April 1992 as Yago Santiago's birthday, but his GM title application says 17 April.) |
| Santo-Roman, Marc | 600083 | 1960-09-13 | Toulouse | | 1996 | France | M | |
| Santos Latasa, Jaime | 2293307 | 1996-07-03 | San Sebastián | | 2018 | Spain | M | title application |
| Santos Ruiz, Miguel | 22291482 | 1999-10-04 | Utrera | | 2018 | Spain | M | title application |
| Sarana, Alexey | 24133795 | 2000-01-26 | Moscow | | 2017 | Russia | M | title application; currently Serbia |
| Sargissian, Gabriel | 13300881 | 1983-09-03 | Yerevan | | 2002 | Armenia | M | |
| Sargsyan, Shant | 13306766 | 2002-01-27 | Yerevan | | 2019 | Armenia | M | title application |
| Šarić, Ante | 14506254 | 1984-04-06 | Split | | 2007 | Croatia | M | title application |
| Šarić, Ibro | 14401290 | 1982-02-20 | Cazin | | 2007 | Bosnia and Herzegovina | M | title application (Note: Ibro Saric's GM title application lists his birthday as 20 December 1982, but both Di Felice and his IM application have 20 February.) |
| Šarić, Ivan | 14508150 | 1990-08-17 | Split | | 2008 | Croatia | M | title application |
| Sarin, Nihal | 25092340 | 2004-07-13 | Thrissur | | 2018 | India | M | title application |
| Sasikiran, Krishnan | 5004985 | 1981-01-07 | Chennai | | 2000 | India | M | |
| Savchenko, Boris | 4147332 | 1986-07-10 | Krasnodar | | 2007 | Russia | M | title application |
| Savchenko, Stanislav | 14101262 | 1967-01-21 | | | 1993 | Ukraine | M | |
| Savić, Miodrag R. | 920479 | 1977-04-06 | Banovići | | 2003 | Serbia and Montenegro | M | currently Serbia |
| Savon, Vladimir | 14100193 | 1940-09-26 | Chernigov | 2005-06-01 | 1973 | Soviet Union | M | later Ukraine |
| Sax, Gyula | 700029 | 1951-06-18 | Budapest | 2014-01-25 | 1974 | Hungary | M | |
| Schandorff, Lars | 1400070 | 1965-04-20 | Copenhagen | | 1996 | Denmark | M | |
| Schebler, Gerhard | 4603338 | 1969-10-03 | Duisburg | | 2004 | Germany | M | title application |
| Schitco, Ivan | 13905465 | 2003-01-04 | Chișinău | | 2022 | Moldova | M | title application; IM title application |
| Schlosser, Philipp | 4600169 | 1968-08-19 | Munich | | 1992 | Germany | M | |
| Schmaltz, Roland | 4614054 | 1974-11-15 | Mannheim | | 2001 | Germany | M | |
| Schmid, Lothar | 4600061 | 1928-05-10 | Dresden | 2013-05-18 | 1959 | West Germany | M | later Germany |
| Schmidt, Włodzimierz | 1100041 | 1943-04-10 | Poznań | 2023-04-01 | 1976 | Poland | M | |
| Schmittdiel, Eckhard | 4600096 | 1960-05-13 | Dortmund | | 1994 | Germany | M | |
| Schoppen, Casper | 1046730 | 2002-03-21 | Utrecht | | 2020 | Netherlands | M | title application |
| Schröder, Jan-Christian | 24662259 | 1998-01-31 | Limburg | | 2015 | Germany | M | title application |
| Schüssler, Harry | 1700081 | 1957-06-24 | Malmö | | 1988 | Sweden | M | |
| Schwartzman, Gabriel | 2011255 | 1976-10-23 | Bucharest | | 1993 | Romania | M | currently United States |
| Sebag, Marie | 617822 | 1986-10-15 | Paris | | 2008 | France | F | title application |
| Šebenik, Matej | 14602296 | 1983-08-28 | Ljubljana | | 2012 | Slovenia | M | title application |
| Sedlak, Nikola | 922900 | 1983-12-13 | Subotica | | 2003 | Serbia and Montenegro | M | currently Serbia |
| Seemann, Jakub | 21874697 | 2008 | | | 2025 | Poland | M | GM title application |
| Seferjan, Narek | 13301071 | 1974-08-20 | Moscow | | 1998 | Armenia | M | |
| Seirawan, Yasser | 2000032 | 1960-03-24 | Damascus | | 1980 | United States | M | |
| Semcesen, Daniel | 1706993 | 1986-08-17 | Sweden | | 2014 | Sweden | M | title application |
| Sengupta, Deep | 5008352 | 1988-06-30 | Chakradharpur | | 2010 | India | M | title application |
| Seres, Lajos | 701254 | 1973-12-08 | Kisköre | | 2003 | Hungary | M | |
| Sergeev, Vladimir | 14101076 | 1964-05-01 | Kyiv | | 2007 | Ukraine | M | title application |
| Sermek, Dražen | 14600714 | 1969-01-30 | Osijek | | 1994 | Slovenia | M | currently Croatia |
| Serper, Grigory | 2012642 | 1969-09-14 | Tashkent | | 1992 | Uzbekistan | M | currently United States |
| Sethuraman, S. P. | 5021596 | 1993-02-25 | Chennai | | 2011 | India | M | title application |
| Sevdimaliyev, Urfan | 13402463 | 1989-01-09 | Nakhchivan | | 2015 | Azerbaijan | M | title application |
| Sevian, Samuel | 2040506 | 2000-12-26 | Corning | | 2014 | United States | M | title application |
| Sevillano, Enrico | 5200156 | 1968-03-17 | Cebu City | | 2012 | United States | M | title application |
| Shabalov, Alexander | 2008572 | 1967-09-12 | Riga | | 1991 | United States | M | |
| Shabanov, Yuri | 4103726 | 1937-11-11 | Khabarovsk | 2010-03-31 | 2004 | Russia | M | |
| Shaked, Tal | 2007991 | 1978-02-05 | Albuquerque | | 1997 | United States | M | |
| Shalnev, Nikolai | 4146042 | 1944-04-16 | | | 2001 | Russia | M | currently Germany |
| Shamkovich, Leonid | 2000857 | 1923-06-01 | Rostov-on-Don | 2005-04-22 | 1965 | Soviet Union | M | later Israel, United States |
| Shanava, Konstantine | 13601784 | 1985-05-05 | | | 2006 | Georgia | M | title application |
| Shankland, Sam | 2004887 | 1991-10-01 | Berkeley | | 2011 | United States | M | title application |
| Shaposhnikov, Evgeny | 4122232 | 1981-06-01 | Saratov | | 2004 | Russia | M | |
| Sharapov, Yevhen | 14103133 | 1981-10-29 | | | 2010 | Ukraine | M | title application |
| Sharavdorj, Dashzegve | 4900340 | 1974-10-21 | | | 1999 | Mongolia | M | |
| Shariyazdanov, Andrey | 4122747 | 1976-07-12 | | | 1998 | Russia | M | currently Serbia |
| Shaw, John | 2400553 | 1968-10-16 | Irvine, North Ayrshire | | 2006 | Scotland | M | |
| Shchekachev, Andrei | 4107730 | 1972-10-27 | | | 1996 | Russia | M | currently France |
| Shcherbakov, Ruslan | 4102240 | 1969-09-14 | Borovichi | | 1993 | Russia | M | |
| Sheng, Joshua | 2057360 | 2000 | | | 2021 | United States | M | title application |
| Shengelia, David | 13601270 | 1980-03-06 | Tbilisi | | 2005 | Georgia | M | title application; currently Austria |
| Sher, Miron | 2019574 | 1952-06-29 | Kaliningrad | 2020-08-22 | 1992 | United States | M | |
| Sherzer, Alex | 2000512 | 1971-02-01 | | 2022-12-04 | 1993 | United States | M | |
| Shimanov, Aleksandr | 4198603 | 1992-05-08 | Saint Petersburg | | 2009 | Russia | M | title application |
| Shipov, Sergei | 4113624 | 1966-04-17 | Murom | | 1996 | Russia | M | |
| Shirov, Alexei | 2209390 | 1972-07-04 | Riga | | 1990 | Soviet Union | M | later Latvia; currently Spain |
| Shishkin, Vadim | 14101696 | 1969-03-04 | Kyiv | | 2007 | Ukraine | M | title application |
| Shkuro, Iuri | 14108836 | 1982-06-20 | Kherson | | 2009 | Ukraine | M | title application |
| Shneider, Aleksandr | 14100045 | 1962-05-22 | Luhansk | | 1990 | Ukraine | M | |
| Shoker, Samy | 627143 | 1987-08-01 | Asnières-sur-Seine | | 2014 | Egypt | M | title application |
| Shomoev, Anton | 4135148 | 1981-06-05 | Ulan-Ude | | 2002 | Russia | M | |
| Short, Nigel D. | 400025 | 1965-06-01 | Leigh | | 1984 | England | M | |
| Shtembuliak, Evgeny | 14113325 | 1999-03-12 | Illichivsk | | 2019 | Ukraine | M | title application |
| Shtyrenkov, Veniamen | 4103351 | 1958-04-23 | | | 1999 | Russia | M | |
| Shubin, Kirill | 34119962 | 2003-04-02 | Vladivostok | | 2026 | FIDE | M | GM title application |
| Shulman, Yury | 13500520 | 1975-04-29 | Minsk | | 1995 | Belarus | M | currently United States |
| Shvyrjov, Igor | 4500490 | 1955-05-24 | Kyiv | | 2005 | Estonia | M | title application (Note: Di Felice lists Luhansk as Shvyrjov's birthplace, but his title application says Kyiv.) |
| Shyaam Nikhil P | 5024218 | 1992-03-21 | Thiruvananthapuram | | 2024 | India | M | title application; IM title application |
| Shyam Sundar M. | 5019141 | 1992-05-28 | Vellore | | 2013 | India | M | |
| Shytaj, Iart Luca | 812633 | 1986-02-03 | Tirana | | 2018 | Italy | M | title application |
| Siddharth, Jagadeesh | 5818320 | 2007 | | | 2024 | Singapore | M | title application |
| Siebrecht, Sebastian | 4609352 | 1973-04-16 | Herdecke | | 2008 | Germany | M | title application |
| Sigurjónsson, Guðmundur | 2300079 | 1947-09-25 | Reykjavík | | 1975 | Iceland | M | |
| Sikula, Vaszilij | 14104911 | 1981-11-29 | Vynohradiv | | 2011 | Ukraine | M | title application |
| Šimáček, Pavel | 307165 | 1979-04-28 | | | 2018 | Czech Republic | M | title application |
| Simagin, Vladimir | | 1919-06-21 | Moscow | 1968-09-25 | 1962 | Soviet Union | M | Gaige |
| Simantsev, Mikhail | 14104555 | 1978-11-01 | Kharkiv | | 2008 | Ukraine | M | title application |
| Simić, Radoslav | 900184 | 1948-06-09 | Mali Požarevac | 2020-01-13 | 1984 | Yugoslavia | M | later Serbia |
| Simonian, Hrair | 13302337 | 1991-01-08 | Yerevan | | 2009 | Armenia | M | IM title application; title application |
| Simutowe, Amon | 8700168 | 1982-01-06 | Ndola | | 2009 | Zambia | M | title application |
| Sindarov, Javokhir | 14205483 | 2005-12-08 | Tashkent | | 2019 | Uzbekistan | M | title application; IM title application |
| Sisniega Campbell, Marcel | 5100020 | 1959-07-28 | Chicago | 2013-01-19 | 1992 | Mexico | M | Gaige |
| Sivuk, Vitaly | 14116502 | 1992-01-01 | | | 2014 | Ukraine | M | title application, currently Sweden |
| Sjugirov, Sanan | 4189302 | 1993-01-31 | Elista | | 2008 | Russia | M | title application; currently Hungary |
| Skatchkov, Pavel | 4121848 | 1979-09-14 | Togliatti | | 2007 | Russia | M | title application |
| Skembris, Spyridon | 4200020 | 1958-02-22 | Mandouki, Corfu | | 1990 | Greece | M | |
| Škoberne, Jure | 14604299 | 1987-03-20 | Šempeter pri Gorici | | 2010 | Slovenia | M | title application |
| Skorchenko, Dmitriy | 4131029 | 1983-10-17 | Pyatigorsk | | 2007 | Russia | M | title application |
| Slipak, Sergio | 100250 | 1965-07-28 | Buenos Aires | | 2001 | Argentina | M | |
| Śliwa, Bogdan | 1102290 | 1922-02-04 | Wieliczka | 2003-05-16 | 1987 | Poland | M | honorary |
| Slobodjan, Roman | 4617347 | 1975-01-01 | Potsdam | | 1996 | Germany | M | |
| Smagin, Sergey | 4100425 | 1958-09-08 | Norilsk | | 1987 | Soviet Union | M | currently Russia |
| Smeets, Jan | 1007246 | 1985-04-05 | Leiden | | 2004 | Netherlands | M | |
| Smejkal, Jan | 300020 | 1946-03-22 | Lanškroun | | 1972 | Czechoslovakia | M | currently Czech Republic |
| Smerdon, David C. | 3202305 | 1984-09-17 | Brisbane | | 2009 | Australia | M | title application |
| Smirin, Ilia | 2801990 | 1968-01-21 | Vitebsk | | 1990 | Soviet Union | M | later Belarus; currently Israel |
| Smirnov, Anton | 3208923 | 2001-01-28 | Canberra | | 2017 | Australia | M | title application |
| Smirnov, Igor | 14110482 | 1987-10-28 | Sevastopol | | 2008 | Ukraine | M | title application |
| Smirnov, Pavel | 4123425 | 1982-04-27 | Mezhdurechensk | | 2003 | Russia | M | |
| Smith, Axel | 1707930 | 1986-06-27 | Ystad | | 2016 | Sweden | M | title application |
| Smith, Bryan | 2017083 | 1980-02-26 | California | | 2013 | United States | M | title application |
| Smyslov, Vasily | 4100310 | 1921-03-24 | Moscow | 2010-03-27 | 1950 | Soviet Union | M | later Russia |
| So, Wesley | 5202213 | 1993-10-09 | Bacoor | | 2008 | Philippines | M | title application; currently United States |
| Soćko, Bartosz | 1107038 | 1978-11-10 | Piaseczno | | 1999 | Poland | M | |
| Soćko, Monika | 1106619 | 1978-03-24 | Warsaw | | 2008 | Poland | F | title application; née Bobrowska |
| Soffer, Ram | 2800101 | 1965-09-06 | | | 1994 | Israel | M | |
| Sochacki, Christophe | 662569 | 1994-06-19 | Paris | | 2022 | France | M | title application; IM title application |
| Sokolov, Andrei | 627089 | 1963-03-20 | Vorkuta | | 1984 | Soviet Union | M | currently France |
| Sokolov, Ivan | 14400030 | 1968-06-13 | Jajce | | 1987 | Yugoslavia | M | later Bosnia and Herzegovina; currently Netherlands |
| Sokolovsky, Yahli | 2820242 | 2006 | | | 2024 | Israel | M | title application |
| Šolak, Dragan | 916811 | 1980-03-30 | Vrbas | | 2001 | Yugoslavia (S&M) | M | later Serbia; currently Turkey |
| Solleveld, Maarten | 1005286 | 1979-02-05 | Amsterdam | | 2012 | Netherlands | M | title application |
| Solodovnichenko, Yuri | 14104369 | 1978-02-08 | Kherson | | 2007 | Ukraine | M | title application |
| Solomon, Kenneth Terence | 14300192 | 1979-10-08 | | | 2015 | South Africa | M | winner African Individual Championships 2014 |
| Solozhenkin, Evgeniy | 4102266 | 1966-07-31 | Leningrad | | 1993 | Russia | M | |
| Soltis, Andrew | 2000741 | 1947-05-28 | Hazleton, Pennsylvania | | 1980 | United States | M | |
| Song, Raymond | 3203824 | 1994-01-11 | | | 2023 | Taiwan | M | title application |
| Sonis, Francesco | 895733 | 2002-04-29 | Genoa | | 2021 | Italy | M | title application; IM title application |
| Sorín, Ariel | 100196 | 1967-04-26 | Buenos Aires | | 1995 | Argentina | M | |
| Sorokin, Aleksey | 24176460 | 2000 | Barnaul | | 2021 | Russia | M | title application |
| Sorokin, Maxim | 108928 | 1968-01-22 | | 2007-06-30 | 1992 | Russia | M | later Argentina |
| Sosa, Tomas | 121576 | 1998-09-09 | Buenos Aires | | 2022 | Argentina | M | title application; IM title application |
| Sosonko, Gennadi | 1000039 | 1943-05-18 | Troitsk | | 1976 | Soviet Union | M | currently Netherlands |
| Spangenberg, Hugo | 101966 | 1975-11-22 | Buenos Aires | | 1996 | Argentina | M | |
| Spasov, Vasil | 2900041 | 1971-02-17 | Varna | | 1990 | Bulgaria | M | |
| Spassky, Boris V. | 600024 | 1937-01-30 | Leningrad | 2025-02-27 | 1955 | Russia | M | |
| Spassov, Liuben | 2900220 | 1943-03-22 | Sofia | | 1976 | Bulgaria | M | sometimes spelled Spasov |
| Speelman, Jon S. | 400033 | 1956-10-02 | London | | 1980 | England | M | |
| Spiridonov, Nikola | 2900238 | 1938-02-28 | Pleven | 2021-03-13 | 1979 | Bulgaria | M | |
| Spoelman, Wouter | 1010891 | 1990-06-05 | Zwolle | | 2009 | Netherlands | M | title application |
| Spraggett, Kevin | 2600013 | 1954-11-10 | Montreal | | 1985 | Canada | M | |
| Sprenger, Jan Michael | 4646258 | 1982-11-26 | Cologne | | 2018 | Germany | M | title application |
| Srihari L R | 46617116 | 2005 | | | 2025 | India | M | title application |
| Sriram Jha | 5001668 | 1976-07-18 | Madhubani | | 2010 | India | M | title application |
| Ståhlberg, Gideon | | 1908-01-26 | Angered | 1967-05-26 | 1950 | Sweden | M | Gaige |
| Stanec, Nikolaus | 1601776 | 1968-04-29 | Vienna | | 2003 | Austria | M | |
| Stangl, Markus | 4600274 | 1969-04-29 | | 2020-11-01 | 1993 | Germany | M | |
| Stanojoski, Zvonko | 15000257 | 1964-01-29 | Prilep | | 2004 | North Macedonia | M | |
| Stany G. A. | 5029104 | 1993-01-22 | Bhadravati, Karnataka | | 2019 | India | M | title application |
| Starostīts, Ilmārs | 11600748 | 1979-05-30 | Rēzekne | | 2010 | Latvia | M | title application |
| Stean, Michael F. | 400130 | 1953-09-04 | London | | 1977 | England | M | |
| Stefanova, Antoaneta | 2902257 | 1979-04-19 | Sofia | | 2002 | Bulgaria | F | |
| Stefánsson, Hannes | 2300087 | 1972-07-18 | | | 1993 | Iceland | M | |
| Stefansson, Vignir Vatnar | 2308649 | 2003-02-07 | | | 2023 | Iceland | M | title application |
| Stein, Leonid | | 1934-11-12 | Kamenets-Podolskiy | 1973-07-04 | 1962 | Soviet Union | M | Gaige |
| Steinberg, Nitzan | 2801795 | 1998-01-12 | | | 2017 | Israel | M | title application |
| Steingrímsson, Héðinn | 2300117 | 1975-01-11 | Reykjavík | | 2007 | Iceland | M | title application |
| Stella, Andrea | 827061 | 1993-08-14 | Cremona | | 2017 | Italy | M | title application |
| Stellwagen, Daniël | 1006673 | 1987-03-01 | Soest | | 2004 | Netherlands | M | title application (Note: Stellwagen's GM title application gives 3 January 1987 as his birthday, but Di Felice and other sources say 1 March.) |
| Stern, René | 4611799 | 1972-02-15 | Dresden | | 2014 | Germany | M | title application (Note: Stern's birthday is listed as 15 February 1972 by Di Felice and on his GM title application, but the German Wikipedia biography René Stern[de] gives 15 May.) |
| Stević, Hrvoje | 14502569 | 1980-01-08 | Osijek | | 2002 | Croatia | M | |
| Štoček, Jiří | 304760 | 1977-05-10 | | | 1998 | Czech Republic | M | |
| Štohl, Igor | 14900025 | 1964-09-27 | Bratislava | | 1992 | Slovakia | M | |
| Stojanović, Dalibor | 922692 | 1983-12-09 | Bijeljina | | 2012 | Bosnia and Herzegovina | M | title application |
| Stojanović, Mihajlo | 916366 | 1977-05-11 | Belgrade | | 2007 | Serbia | M | title application |
| Stoltz, Gösta | | 1904-05-09 | Stockholm | 1963-07-25 | 1954 | Sweden | M | Gaige |
| Stopa, Jacek | 1119591 | 1987-01-03 | Wrocław | | 2015 | Poland | M | title application |
| Stremavičius, Titas | 12804444 | 1998-02-15 | Kaunas | | 2020 | Lithuania | M | title application |
| Striković, Aleksa | 900150 | 1961-05-12 | Skopje | | 1996 | Yugoslavia (S&M) | M | currently Serbia |
| Stripunsky, Alexander | 2015315 | 1970-08-18 | | | 1998 | United States | M | |
| Studer, Noel | 1319620 | 1996-10-18 | Bern | | 2017 | Switzerland | M | title application |
| Stukopin, Andrey | 24107131 | 1994-06-02 | Rostov-on-Don | | 2014 | Russia | M | title application |
| Stupak, Kirill | 13503758 | 1990-03-16 | Minsk | | 2011 | Belarus | M | title application |
| Sturt, Raven | 2007304 | 1993-08-01 | Sedona, Arizona | | 2022 | United States | M | title application; IM title application |
| Sturua, Zurab | 13600095 | 1959-06-08 | Tbilisi | | 1991 | Georgia | M | |
| Șubă, Mihai | 1203363 | 1947-06-01 | Bucharest | 2025-10-26 | 1978 | Romania | M | currently Spain |
| Šubelj, Jan | 14618583 | 2004-09-13 | Ljubljana | | 2023 | Slovenia | M | title application; IM title application |
| Subramaniyam, Bharath | 46634827 | 2007-10-17 | Chennai | | 2022 | India | M | title application; IM title application |
| Suetin, Alexey | 4104668 | 1926-11-16 | Kirovograd | 2001-09-10 | 1965 | Russia | M | |
| Šulava, Nenad | 14500205 | 1962-12-25 | Osijek | 2019-09-05 | 2000 | Croatia | M | later Monaco |
| Suleymanli, Aydin | 13413937 | 2005-03-20 | Baku | | 2021 | Azerbaijan | M | title application; IM title application (Note: Although Suleymanli's IM title application lists his birthdate as 20 March 2005, other online sources have 22 March.) |
| Suleymenov, Alisher | 13707833 | 2000-08-05 | Pavlodar | | 2023 | Kazakhstan | M | title application; IM title application; IM title result |
| Šulskis, Šarūnas | 12800112 | 1972-11-26 | Kėdainiai | | 1996 | Lithuania | M | |
| Sulypa, Oleksandr | 14100487 | 1972-06-03 | Lviv | | 2000 | Ukraine | M | |
| Sumets, Andrey | 14105500 | 1980-04-15 | Odesa | | 2006 | Ukraine | M | title application |
| Summerscale, Aaron P. | 400980 | 1969-08-26 | London | | 1997 | England | M | |
| Sundararajan Kidambi | 5005370 | 1982-12-29 | Chennai | | 2009 | India | M | title application (Note: Di Felice gives 29 Jun 1982 as Sundararajan Kidambi's birthday, but his GM title application lists 29 December.) |
| Sunye Neto, Jaime | 2100037 | 1957-05-02 | Curitiba | | 1986 | Brazil | M | |
| Supi, Luis Paulo | 2106388 | 1996-10-10 | Catanduva | | 2018 | Brazil | M | title application |
| Suradiradja, Herman | 7100167 | 1947-10-14 | Sukabumi | 2016-06-06 | 1978 | Indonesia | M | |
| Sutovsky, Emil | 2802007 | 1977-09-19 | Baku | | 1996 | Israel | M | |
| Suttles, Duncan | 2600056 | 1945-12-21 | San Francisco | | 1973 | Canada | M | |
| Suyarov, Mukhammadzokhid | 14210495 | 2009 | | | 2026 | Uzbekistan | M | GM title application |
| Svane, Frederik | 12923044 | 2004-01-21 | Lübeck | | 2022 | Germany | M | title application |
| Svane, Rasmus | 4657101 | 1997-05-21 | Allerød Municipality | | 2016 | Germany | M | title application |
| Sveshnikov, Evgeny | 4100638 | 1950-02-11 | Chelyabinsk | 2021-08-18 | 1977 | Soviet Union | M | later Latvia and Russia |
| Svetushkin, Dmitry | 13900463 | 1980-07-25 | | 2020-09-04 | 2002 | Moldova | M | |
| Svidler, Peter | 4102142 | 1976-06-17 | Leningrad | | 1994 | Russia | M | |
| Swapnil Dhopade | 5019184 | 1990-10-05 | Nagpur | | 2016 | India | M | title application |
| Swayams, Mishra | 5028183 | 1992-08-13 | Cuttack | | 2019 | India | M | title application |
| Świercz, Dariusz | 1126881 | 1994-05-31 | Tarnowskie Góry | | 2009 | Poland | M | title application (Note: Świercz's GM title application gives his birth year as 1984. Di Felice says he was born in 1994.); currently United States |
| Swinkels, Robin | 1010824 | 1989-04-06 | Asten | | 2009 | Netherlands | M | title application |
| Sychev, Klementy | 4114060 | 1996-07-12 | | | 2019 | Russia | M | title application |
| Szabó, Gergely-Andras-Gyula | 1205064 | 1983-04-13 | Bucharest | | 2010 | Romania | M | title application |
| Szabó, Krisztián | 722901 | 1989-06-21 | Székesfehérvár | | 2010 | Hungary | M | title application |
| Szabó, László | | 1917-03-19 | Budapest | 1998-08-08 | 1950 | Hungary | M | |
| Székely, Péter | 700258 | 1955-02-08 | Budapest | 2003-08-31 | 1994 | Hungary | M | |
| Szpar, Miłosz | 1184989 | 2002 | | | 2025 | Poland | M | title application |
| Tabatabaei, M. Amin | 12521213 | 2001-02-05 | Tehran | | 2018 | Iran | M | title application |
| Tadić, Branko | 916412 | 1973-10-04 | Belgrade | | 2010 | Serbia | M | title application |
| Tahirov, Farhad | 13401661 | 1987-04-12 | | | 2002 | Azerbaijan | M | |
| Taimanov, Mark | 4100760 | 1926-02-07 | Kharkov | 2016-11-28 | 1952 | Soviet Union | M | later Russia |
| Tal, Mikhail | | 1936-11-09 | Riga | 1992-06-28 | 1957 | Soviet Union | M | later Ukraine, Latvia |
| Taleb, Moussa | 9300201 | 1978-07-01 | Dubai | | 2004 | United Arab Emirates | M | |
| Talla, Vladimir | 303445 | 1973-07-03 | Ostrava | | 2010 | Czech Republic | M | title application |
| Tan, Justin | 3206882 | 1997-03-19 | Cardiff | | 2018 | Australia | M | title application |
| Tan Zhongyi | 8603642 | 1991-05-29 | Chongqing | | 2017 | China | F | Women's World Champion 2017–2018; WGM title application |
| Tang, Andrew | 2059630 | 1999-11-29 | Naperville | | 2018 | United States | M | title application |
| Tarhan, Adar | 34544712 | 2007 | | | 2026 | Turkey | M | GM title application |
| Tari, Aryan | 1510045 | 1999-06-04 | Stavanger | | 2016 | Norway | M | title application |
| Tarjan, James | 2000180 | 1952-02-22 | Pomona, California | | 1976 | United States | M | |
| Tarlev, Konstantin | 14114089 | 1987-02-09 | | | 2013 | Ukraine | M | title application |
| Tartakower, Savielly | | 1887-02-21 | Rostov-on-Don | 1956-02-05 | 1950 | France | M | Gaige |
| Tazbir, Marcin | 1122452 | 1988-08-22 | Piotrków Trybunalski | | 2013 | Poland | M | title application (Note: Tazbir's GM title application lists his birthday as 2 August 1988, but Di Felice and his IM title application have 22 August.) |
| Teclaf, Paweł | 1185934 | 2003-06-18 | | | 2023 | Poland | M | title application; IM title application |
| Temirbayev, Serikbay | 13700022 | 1961-08-08 | | | 1995 | Kazakhstan | M | |
| Ten Hertog, Hugo | 1026356 | 1994-07-06 | Utrecht | | 2020 | Netherlands | M | title application |
| Ter-Sahakyan, Samvel | 13302531 | 1993-09-19 | | | 2009 | Armenia | M | title application |
| Teschner, Rudolf | 4603850 | 1922-02-16 | Potsdam | 2006-07-23 | 1992 | West Germany | M | honorary; later Germany |
| Teske, Henrik | 4611500 | 1968-02-28 | | | 1996 | Germany | M | |
| Teterev, Vitaly | 13501429 | 1983-01-07 | Novopolotsk | | 2007 | Belarus | M | title application |
| Thejkumar, M. S. | 5009154 | 1981-01-01 | Mysore | | 2017 | India | M | title application |
| Theodorou, Nikolas | 4262875 | 2000-09-17 | | | 2021 | Greece | M | title application; IM title application |
| Thipsay, Praveen M | 5000033 | 1959-08-12 | Mumbai | | 1997 | India | M | |
| Thorfinnsson, Bragi | 2300958 | 1981-04-10 | Reykjavík | | 2018 | Iceland | M | title application |
| Thórhallsson, Thröstur | 2300109 | 1969-03-19 | | | 1996 | Iceland | M | |
| Thybo, Jesper Søndergaard | 1438832 | 1999-01-10 | | | 2020 | Denmark | M | title application |
| Tiglon, Bryce | 2087456 | 2000-12-28 | | | 2024 | United States | M | title application |
| Tihonov, Jurij | 13500325 | 1978-07-03 | Minsk | | 2006 | Belarus | M | |
| Tikkanen, Hans | 1706446 | 1985-02-06 | Karlstad | | 2010 | Sweden | M | title application |
| Tilicheev, Viacheslav | 24114928 | 1994-07-17 | Krasnoyarsk | | 2020 | Russia | M | title application; currently Serbia |
| Timman, Jan H. | 1000012 | 1951-12-14 | Amsterdam | 2026-02-18 | 1974 | Netherlands | M | |
| Timofeev, Artyom | 4140419 | 1985-01-06 | Kazan | | 2003 | Russia | M | |
| Timoscenko, Gennadij | 14901536 | 1949-04-27 | Cheliabinsk | | 1980 | Soviet Union | M | currently Slovakia |
| Timoshenko, Georgy | 14100118 | 1966-06-01 | Kyiv | | 1994 | Ukraine | M | |
| Tin, Jingyao | 5804418 | 2000-07-13 | | | 2022 | Singapore | M | title application |
| Tischbierek, Raj | 4611322 | 1962-09-24 | Leipzig | | 1990 | Germany | M | |
| Tisdall, Jonathan D. | 1500066 | 1958-08-26 | Buffalo | | 1993 | Norway | M | (Note: Di Felice lists Tisdall's GM title year as 1995, but FIDE Golden Book and Tisdall's FIDE Chess Profile say the title was awarded in 1993.) |
| Tishin, Petr | 4130057 | 1976-10-21 | | | 2002 | Russia | M | (Note: Di Felice lists Tishin's GM title year as 2005, but FIDE Golden Book and Tishin's FIDE Chess Profile say the title award was in 2002.) |
| Tiviakov, Sergei | 1008013 | 1973-02-14 | Krasnodar | | 1991 | Russia | M | currently Netherlands |
| Tkachiev, Vladislav | 618438 | 1973-11-09 | Moscow | | 1995 | Kazakhstan | M | currently France |
| Todorčević Antić, Miodrag | 900060 | 1940-11-10 | Belgrade | | 1989 | Yugoslavia | M | later Serbia and Montenegro; currently Spain |
| Todorov, Todor | 2903237 | 1974-11-08 | Varna | | 2006 | Bulgaria | M | currently Belgium |
| Todorović, Goran M. | 900168 | 1963-05-17 | | | 1997 | Yugoslavia (S&M) | M | currently Serbia |
| Tolnai, Tibor | 700126 | 1964-09-23 | Hódmezővásárhely | | 1990 | Hungary | M | |
| Tolush, Alexander | | 1910-05-01 | Saint Petersburg | 1969-03-03 | 1953 | Soviet Union | M | Gaige |
| Tomashevsky, Evgeny | 4147235 | 1987-07-01 | Saratov | | 2005 | Russia | M | |
| Tomczak, Jacek | 1124668 | 1990-03-05 | Śrem | | 2012 | Poland | M | title application |
| Xiao, Tong | 8622388 | 2008 | | | 2024 | China | M | title application |
| Topalov, Veselin | 2900084 | 1975-03-15 | Ruse | | 1992 | Bulgaria | M | |
| Torre Repetto, Carlos | | 1904-11-29 | Mérida, Yucatán | 1978-03-19 | 1977 | Mexico | M | honorary (Note: Most sources including FIDE records give his birth date as 23 November 1905, but his birth certificate says 29 November 1904. "Birth certificate, TORRE Y REPETTO Carlos Jesús", Geneanet) |
| Torre, Eugenio | 5200016 | 1951-11-04 | Iloilo City | | 1974 | Philippines | M | |
| Tošić, Miroslav | 900460 | 1960-06-15 | Svrljig | 2019-11-24 | 1998 | Yugoslavia (S&M) | M | later Serbia |
| Totsky, Leonid | 4115228 | 1967-08-10 | | | 2000 | Russia | M | |
| Toufighi, Homayoon | 12503592 | 1990-03-21 | Rasht | | 2010 | Iran | M | title application |
| Trajković, Predrag | 915874 | 1970-05-28 | Gnjilane | 2019-02-13 | 2008 | Serbia | M | title application |
| Trần, Tuấn Minh | 12401820 | 1997-10-21 | | | 2017 | Vietnam | M | title application |
| Tratar, Marko | 14600684 | 1974-05-20 | Ljubljana | | 2006 | Slovenia | M | |
| Tregubov, Pavel V. | 4115341 | 1971-12-21 | Krasnodar | | 1994 | Russia | M | currently France |
| Trifunović, Petar | | 1910-08-31 | Dubrovnik | 1980-12-08 | 1953 | Yugoslavia | M | |
| Tringov, Georgi | 2900203 | 1937-03-07 | Plovdiv | 2000-07-02 | 1963 | Bulgaria | M | |
| Tristán, Leonardo | 113816 | 1989-11-22 | Necochea | | 2020 | Argentina | M | title application |
| Troff, Kayden | 2047896 | 1998-05-06 | Murray, Utah | | 2014 | United States | M | title application |
| Tsaruk, Maksim | 13511173 | 2005-07-10 | Svyetlahorsk | | 2025 | Belarus | M | GM title application; IM title application |
| Tseitlin, Mark D. | 2800128 | 1943-09-23 | Leningrad | 2022-01-24 | 1997 | Israel | M | |
| Tseshkovsky, Vitaly | 4100921 | 1944-09-25 | Omsk | 2011-12-24 | 1975 | Soviet Union | M | later Russia |
| Tsydypov, Zhamsaran | 4108566 | 1996-09-05 | Ulan-Ude | | 2019 | Russia | M | title application |
| Từ Hoàng Thông | 12400076 | 1972-06-22 | Ho Chi Minh City | | 1999 | Vietnam | M | |
| Tukhaev, Adam | 14109476 | 1988-02-14 | Kerch | | 2007 | Ukraine | M | title application |
| Tukmakov, Vladimir B. | 14100096 | 1946-03-15 | Odesa | | 1972 | Soviet Union | M | currently Ukraine |
| Tunik, Gennady | 4101219 | 1953-05-27 | Magadan | | 2002 | Russia | M | |
| Turner, Matthew J. | 402893 | 1975-12-11 | | | 2002 | England | M | currently Scotland |
| Turov, Maxim | 4120086 | 1979-12-07 | Gukovo | | 1999 | Russia | M | |
| Tyomkin, Dimitri | 2803089 | 1977-03-25 | | | 2001 | Canada | M | currently Israel |
| Tzidkiya, Yeshaayahu | 2824493 | 2003 | | | 2026 | Israel | M | GM title application |
| Ubilava, Elizbar | 13600052 | 1950-08-27 | Tbilisi | | 1988 | Soviet Union | M | later Georgia; currently Spain |
| Udovčić, Mijo | | 1920-09-11 | Stara Jošava | 1984-04-08 | 1962 | Yugoslavia | M | |
| Uhlmann, Wolfgang | 4611284 | 1935-03-29 | Dresden | 2020-08-24 | 1959 | East Germany | M | later Germany |
| Ulybin, Mikhail | 4101405 | 1971-05-31 | Sverdlovsk | | 1991 | Russia | M | |
| Unzicker, Wolfgang | 4600126 | 1925-06-26 | Pirmasens | 2006-04-20 | 1954 | West Germany | M | later Germany |
| Urday, Henry | 3800032 | 1967-07-05 | Lima | | 1992 | Peru | M | |
| Urkedal, Frode Olav Olsen | 1506102 | 1993-05-14 | Oslo | | 2016 | Norway | M | title application |
| Ushenina, Anna | 14110911 | 1985-08-30 | Kharkiv | | 2012 | Ukraine | F | Women's World Champion 2012–2013; IM title application |
| Uskov, Artem | 34254854 | 2010 | | | 2025 | FIDE | M | title application |
| Vachier-Lagrave, Maxime | 623539 | 1990-10-21 | Nogent-sur-Marne | | 2005 | France | M | title application |
| Vadász, László | 700401 | 1948-01-27 | Kiskunfélegyháza | 2005-01-03 | 1976 | Hungary | M | |
| Vaganian, Rafael A. | 13300016 | 1951-10-15 | Yerevan | | 1971 | Soviet Union | M | currently Armenia |
| Vaibhav, Suri | 5045185 | 1997-02-08 | New Delhi | | 2012 | India | M | title application |
| Vaisser, Anatoli | 603252 | 1949-03-05 | Alma Ata | | 1985 | Soviet Union | M | later Russia; currently France |
| Vajda, Levente | 1203975 | 1981-02-13 | Odorheiu Secuiesc | | 2001 | Romania | M | |
| Vakhidov, Jakhongir | 14201801 | 1995-04-27 | Samarkand | | 2014 | Uzbekistan | M | title application |
| Vakhidov, Tair | 14200155 | 1963-12-11 | Samarkand | | 2009 | Uzbekistan | M | title application |
| Valerga, Diego | 100587 | 1971-10-01 | Buenos Aires | | 2009 | Argentina | M | title application |
| Vallejo Pons, Francisco | 2205530 | 1982-08-21 | Mahón | | 1999 | Spain | M | |
| Valsecchi, Alessio | 818860 | 1992-04-25 | Bergamo | | 2019 | Italy | M | title application |
| Van den Doel, Erik | 1003720 | 1979-05-15 | Leiden | | 1998 | Netherlands | M | |
| Van der Sterren, Paul | 1000071 | 1956-03-17 | Venlo | | 1989 | Netherlands | M | |
| Van der Weide, Karel | 1003143 | 1973-08-11 | Amsterdam | | 2004 | Netherlands | M | |
| Van der Wiel, John T. H. | 1000020 | 1959-08-09 | Leiden | | 1982 | Netherlands | M | |
| Van Foreest, Jorden | 1039784 | 1999-04-30 | Groningen | | 2016 | Netherlands | M | title application |
| Van Foreest, Lucas | 1039792 | 2001-03-03 | Groningen | | 2018 | Netherlands | M | title application |
| Van Kampen, Robin | 1020854 | 1994-11-14 | Blaricum | | 2011 | Netherlands | M | title application |
| Van Wely, Loek | 1000268 | 1972-10-07 | Heesch | | 1993 | Netherlands | M | |
| Varavin, Viktor | 4101766 | 1967-05-23 | | | 1995 | Russia | M | |
| Varga, Zoltán | 700509 | 1970-07-12 | | | 1995 | Hungary | M | |
| Varshney, Aaryan | 45048975 | 2005 | | | 2026 | India | M | GM title application |
| Vasilev, Milen | 2903628 | 1978-06-06 | Burgas | | 2009 | Bulgaria | M | title application |
| Vasiukov, Evgeni | 4100522 | 1933-03-05 | Moscow | 2018-05-10 | 1961 | Russia | M | |
| Vásquez Schroeder, Rodrigo | 3400042 | 1969-12-06 | | | 2004 | Chile | M | |
| Vaulin, Alexander | 4101634 | 1957-03-18 | | 2008 | 1994 | Russia | M | |
| Vavulin, Maxim | 4169530 | 1998-05-06 | Moscow | | 2018 | Russia | M | title application; currently Germany |
| Vázquez, Guillermo | 3702308 | 1997-03-16 | Asunción | | 2022 | Paraguay | M | title application; IM title application |
| Vázquez Igarza, Renier | 3503054 | 1979-01-08 | | | 2007 | Spain | M | title application; currently Cuba |
| Velička, Petr | 300659 | 1967-02-26 | Frýdek-Místek | | 2007 | Czech Republic | M | title application |
| Velikov, Petar | 2900149 | 1951-03-30 | Tolbukhin | | 1982 | Bulgaria | M | |
| Velimirović, Dragoljub | 900079 | 1942-05-12 | Valjevo | 2014-05-22 | 1973 | Yugoslavia | M | later Serbia |
| Velten, Paul | 681091 | 1993-08-10 | Hanoi | | 2018 | France | M | title application |
| Venkataraman, Karthik | 25006479 | 1999-12-22 | Vellore | | 2018 | India | M | title application |
| Venkatesh, M. R. | 5005779 | 1985-05-20 | Chennai | | 2012 | India | M | title application |
| Vera González-Quevedo, Reynaldo | 3500055 | 1961-01-07 | Unión de Reyes | | 1988 | Cuba | M | |
| Vera Sigueñas, Deivy | 3804623 | 1992-01-18 | Chicama | | 2020 | Peru | M | title application |
| Vernay, Clovis | 633046 | 1989-07-15 | Saint-Chamond | | 2022 | France | M | title application; Di Felice; currently Switzerland |
| Vescovi, Giovanni | 2100789 | 1978-06-14 | Porto Alegre | | 1998 | Brazil | M | |
| Vetokhin, Savva | 44144474 | 2009 | | | 2024 | FIDE | M | title application |
| Vetoshko, Volodymyr | 14122480 | 1998-04-16 | Horodok | | 2017 | Ukraine | M | title application |
| Vidmar, Milan | | 1885-06-22 | Ljubljana | 1962-10-09 | 1950 | Yugoslavia | M | |
| Vignesh N. R. | 25012215 | 1998-01-24 | Thiruvananthapuram | | 2023 | India | M | title application; IM title application |
| Vila Gázquez, Xavier | 2261090 | 1990-03-08 | Barcelona | | 2011 | Spain | M | title application |
| Villamayor, Buenaventura | 5200393 | 1967-05-04 | Mauban | | 2000 | Philippines | M | currently Singapore |
| Visakh N. R. | 25012223 | 1999-04-24 | Nagercoil | | 2019 | India | M | title application |
| Vishnu Prasanna V. | 5030692 | 1989-08-12 | Chennai | | 2013 | India | M | title application |
| Visser, Yge | 1000578 | 1963-07-29 | Sneek | | 2006 | Netherlands | M | |
| Vitiugov, Nikita | 4152956 | 1987-02-04 | Leningrad | | 2007 | Russia | M | title application; currently England |
| Vlachos, Anatole | 26093189 | 2002-02-11 | | | 2026 | Greece | M | GM title application; IM title application |
| Vladimirov, Yevgeniy | 13700014 | 1957-01-20 | Alma Ata | | 1989 | Soviet Union | M | currently Kazakhstan |
| Vocaturo, Daniele | 813192 | 1989-12-16 | Rome | | 2009 | Italy | M | title application |
| Vogel, Roven | 12908088 | 2000-07-17 | Oschatz | | 2024 | Germany | M | title application; IM title application |
| Vogt, Lothar | 4611292 | 1952-01-17 | Görlitz | | 1976 | Germany | M | |
| Voitsekhovsky, Stanislav | 4113470 | 1964-08-06 | | | 1999 | Russia | M | |
| Vokáč, Marek | 300101 | 1958-12-06 | Prague | 2021-11-14 | 1999 | Czech Republic | M | |
| Vokarev, Sergey | 4119711 | 1970-08-28 | Yekaterinburg | | 2008 | Russia | M | title application |
| Vokhidov, Shamsiddin | 14204223 | 2002-01-11 | | | 2020 | Uzbekistan | M | title application |
| Volkov, Sergey | 4122763 | 1974-02-07 | Saransk | | 1998 | Russia | M | |
| Volodin, Aleksandr | 4501950 | 1990-12-10 | Kohtla-Järve | | 2011 | Estonia | M | IM title application |
| Volokitin, Andrei | 14107090 | 1986-06-18 | Lviv | | 2001 | Ukraine | M | |
| Volosin, Leon | 311111 | 1964-05-10 | Kazan | | 2003 | Czech Republic | M | |
| Volzhin, Alexander | 4115031 | 1971-02-02 | Makhachkala | | 1997 | Russia | M | |
| Vorobiov, Evgeny E. | 4121341 | 1976-12-13 | | | 2000 | Russia | M | |
| Vorontsov, Pavlo | 14116367 | 1998-01-23 | Kyiv | | 2017 | Ukraine | M | title application |
| Vorotnikov, Vladislav V. | 4103009 | 1947-08-17 | Leningrad | | 2005 | Russia | M | |
| Votava, Jan | 300535 | 1974-11-29 | | | 1999 | Czech Republic | M | |
| Vovk, Andriy | 14114470 | 1991-11-22 | Lviv | | 2009 | Ukraine | M | title application |
| Vovk, Yuri | 14113171 | 1988-11-11 | Lviv | | 2008 | Ukraine | M | title application |
| Vrolijk, Liam | 1048333 | 2002-07-05 | Capelle aan den IJssel | | 2022 | Netherlands | M | title application; IM title application |
| Vučković, Bojan | 922277 | 1980-09-12 | Belgrade | | 2001 | Yugoslavia (S&M) | M | currently Serbia |
| Vukić, Milan | 900273 | 1942-08-19 | Sanski Most | | 1975 | Yugoslavia | M | later Serbia and Montenegro and Serbia; currently Bosnia and Herzegovina |
| Vul, Arkadi Eremeevich | 4104307 | 1953-09-11 | | | 2003 | Russia | M | title application |
| Vykouk, Jan | 349658 | 2000 | | | 2026 | Czech Republic | M | GM title application |
| Vysochin, Spartak | 14103516 | 1975-04-30 | Kyiv | | 2001 | Ukraine | M | |
| Vyzmanavin, Alexey | 4100190 | 1960-12-04 | Moscow | 2000-01-06 | 1989 | Russia | M | |
| Wadsworth, Matthew | 415804 | 2000-06-27 | Ascot | | 2025 | England | M | title application |
| Wagner, Dennis | 24650684 | 1997-06-19 | Kassel | | 2015 | Germany | M | title application |
| Wahyuwidayat, Utut Adianto | 7100019 | 1965-03-16 | Jakarta | | 1986 | Indonesia | M | commonly Utut Adianto |
| Wahls, Matthias | 4600070 | 1968-01-25 | Hamburg | | 1989 | Germany | M | (Note: Wahls' birthplace from Matthias Wahls, "My Chess CV, 1968", matthias-wahls.com) |
| Wan Yunguo | 8603189 | 1990-06-28 | Shandong | | 2016 | China | M | title application |
| Wang Hao | 8602883 | 1989-08-04 | Harbin | | 2005 | China | M | |
| Wang Rui | 8601003 | 1978-04-18 | Hebei | | 2009 | China | M | title application |
| Wang Yue | 8601429 | 1987-03-31 | Taiyuan | | 2004 | China | M | |
| Wang Zili | 8600023 | 1968-06-14 | | | 1995 | China | M | |
| Warakomski, Tomasz | 1124552 | 1989-06-22 | Suwałki | | 2017 | Poland | M | title application |
| Ward, Chris G | 400203 | 1968-03-26 | London | | 1996 | England | M | |
| Warmerdam, Max | 1048104 | 2000-03-30 | Tegelen | | 2021 | Netherlands | M | title application |
| Watson, William N. | 400157 | 1962-04-18 | Baghdad | | 1990 | England | M | |
| Wedberg, Tom | 1700073 | 1953-11-26 | Stockholm | | 1990 | Sweden | M | (Note: Di Felice lists Wedberg's GM title year as 1995, but FIDE Golden Book and the online FIDE Chess Profile say his title was awarded in 1990.) |
| Wei Yi | 8603405 | 1999-06-02 | Wuxi | | 2013 | China | M | title application |
| Wells, Peter K. | 400327 | 1965-04-17 | Portsmouth | | 1994 | England | M | |
| Wen Yang | 8602956 | 1988-07-07 | Shandong | | 2008 | China | M | title application |
| Werle, Jan | 1006088 | 1984-01-15 | Warnsveld | | 2006 | Netherlands | M | |
| Westerberg, Jonathan | 1701754 | 1994-02-25 | | | 2021 | Sweden | M | title application |
| Westerinen, Heikki M. J. | 500020 | 1944-04-27 | Helsinki | | 1975 | Finland | M | |
| Wieczorek, Oskar | 1133950 | 1994-06-13 | Wrocław | | 2019 | Poland | M | title application |
| Wilder, Michael | 2000130 | 1962-08-17 | Philadelphia | | 1988 | United States | M | |
| Williams, Simon K. | 404454 | 1979-11-30 | Guildford | | 2008 | England | M | |
| Winants, Luc | 200018 | 1963-01-01 | Brussels | 2023-02-07 | 1998 | Belgium | M | |
| Wirig, Anthony | 615013 | 1983-02-03 | Thionville | | 2011 | France | M | title application |
| Wojtaszek, Radosław | 1118358 | 1987-01-13 | Elbląg | | 2005 | Poland | M | title application |
| Wojtkiewicz, Aleksander | 1100025 | 1963-01-15 | Riga | 2006-07-14 | 1990 | Poland | M | later United States |
| Wolff, Patrick | 2000148 | 1968-02-15 | New York City | | 1990 | United States | M | |
| Womacka, Mathias | 4611390 | 1966-06-26 | Karl-Marx-Stadt | | 2010 | Germany | M | title application |
| Wong Meng Kong | 5800030 | 1963-09-18 | Singapore | | 1999 | Singapore | M | |
| Woodward, Andy | 30953499 | 2010 | | | 2024 | United States | M | title application |
| Wu Shaobin | 5800714 | 1969-02-04 | | | 1998 | China | M | currently Singapore |
| Wu Wenjin | 8600716 | 1976-03-10 | | | 2000 | China | M | |
| Xie Jun | 8600147 | 1970-10-30 | Baoding | | 1993 | China | F | FIDE Golden Book; Di Felice (Note: Di Felice gives 1995 as Xie Jun's GM title year, but FIDE Golden book lists her with the 1993 awardees.) |
| Xiong, Jeffery | 2047640 | 2000-10-30 | Plano | | 2015 | United States | M | title application |
| Xiu Deshun | 8603693 | 1989-02-01 | Qingdao | | 2011 | China | M | title application |
| Xu Jun | 8600031 | 1962-09-17 | Suzhou | | 1994 | China | M | |
| Xu Xiangyu | 8608288 | 1999-09-19 | Taiyuan | | 2017 | China | M | title application (Note: Xu Xiangyu's birthday is more legible on his IM title application.) |
| Xu Yi | 8605564 | 1998-05-28 | Shanghai | | 2019 | China | M | title application |
| Xu Yinglun | 8604940 | 1996-12-03 | Harbin | | 2017 | China | M | title application |
| Xu Yuhua | 8600635 | 1976-10-29 | Jinhua | | 2007 | China | F | |
| Xu, Zhihang | 8611572 | 2001-11-09 | Shandong | | 2026 | China | M | GM title application; IM title application |
| Xue, Haowen | 8625492 | 2008 | | | 2025 | China | M | title application |
| Yagupov, Igor | 4113632 | 1965-10-13 | Tula | | 2003 | Russia | M | |
| Yakovich, Yuri | 4100654 | 1962-11-30 | Kuybyshev | | 1990 | Russia | M | |
| Yakubboev, Nodirbek | 14203987 | 2002-01-23 | | | 2019 | Uzbekistan | M | title application |
| Yandemirov, Valeri | 4102622 | 1963-02-11 | Kazan | 2017-11-16 | 1997 | Russia | M | |
| Yang, Darwin | 2029111 | 1996-12-04 | Dallas | | 2016 | United States | M | title application |
| Yang Kaiqi | 8604398 | 1988-05-06 | Heilongjiang | | 2019 | Canada | M | title application |
| Yankelevich, Lev | 24684074 | 1997-10-28 | Kasan, Iran | | 2022 | Germany | M | title application; IM title application |
| Yanofsky, Daniel | 2600080 | 1925-03-26 | Brody | 2000-03-05 | 1964 | Canada | M | |
| Ye Jiangchuan | 8600040 | 1960-11-20 | Shanxi | | 1993 | China | M | |
| Ye Rongguang | 8600015 | 1963-10-03 | Wenzhou | | 1990 | China | M | |
| Yegiazarian, Arsen | 13300520 | 1970-06-18 | Yerevan | 2020-04-20 | 2001 | Armenia | M | (Note: Yegiazarian's death reported in "Մահացել է գրոսմայստեր Արսեն Եղիազարյանը". 1lurer.am (in Armenian). 20 April 2020.) |
| Yemelin, Vasily | 4113217 | 1976-02-01 | Leningrad | | 1994 | Russia | M | |
| Yeoh, Li Tian | 5702895 | 1999-10-16 | | | 2025 | Malaysia | M | GM title application |
| Yermolinsky, Alex | 2005492 | 1958-04-11 | Leningrad | | 1992 | United States | M | |
| Yevseev, Denis | 4126378 | 1973-07-03 | Murmansk | | 2003 | Russia | M | |
| Yılmaz, Mustafa | 6302718 | 1992-11-05 | Kastamonu | | 2012 | Turkey | M | title application |
| Yılmazyerli, Mert | 6305962 | 1992-09-17 | Bornova | | 2022 | Turkey | M | title application; IM title application |
| Yoo, Christopher Woojin | 30909694 | 2006-12-19 | Fremont, California | | 2022 | United States | M | title application; IM title application |
| Yrjölä, Jouni | 500011 | 1959-10-24 | Vilppula | | 1990 | Finland | M | |
| Yu Ruiyuan | 8603090 | 1991-09-01 | Guangdong | | 2012 | China | M | title application |
| Yu Shaoteng | 8600660 | 1979-03-26 | Guangzhou | | 2004 | China | M | title application |
| Yu Yangyi | 8603820 | 1994-06-08 | Hubei | | 2009 | China | M | title application |
| Yudasin, Leonid | 2802341 | 1959-08-08 | Leningrad | | 1990 | Soviet Union | M | FIDE Golden Book; currently Israel |
| Yudin, Sergei | 4159659 | 1986-06-10 | Novosibirsk | | 2009 | Russia | M | title application |
| Yuffa, Daniil | 24131423 | 1997-02-25 | Tyumen | | 2016 | Russia | M | title application; currently Spain |
| Yurtaev, Leonid | 13800019 | 1959-05-01 | Frunze | 2011-06-02 | 1996 | Kyrgyzstan | M | |
| Zablotsky, Sergei | 4131606 | 1982-01-15 | Krasnoyarsk | | 2010 | Russia | M | title application |
| Zaibi, Amir | 5500796 | 1988-05-22 | | | 2020 | Tunisia | M | winner Arab championship 2019 |
| Zagorskis, Darius | 12800120 | 1969-11-20 | Kaunas | | 2013 | Lithuania | M | title application |
| Zagrebelny, Sergey | 14200040 | 1965-04-09 | | | 1993 | Uzbekistan | M | |
| Zaichik, Gennadi | 13600109 | 1957-02-11 | Tbilisi | | 1984 | Soviet Union | M | later Georgia; currently United States |
| Zaitsev, Alexander | | 1935-06-15 | Vladivostok | 1971-10-31 | 1967 | Soviet Union | M | Gaige |
| Zaitsev, Alexander | 4164490 | 1985-06-28 | Tula | | 2017 | Russia | M | title application |
| Zaitsev, Igor A. | 4103017 | 1938-05-27 | Ramenskoye | | 1976 | Russia | M | (Note: FIDE gives Igor Zaitsev's birth year as 1937, but Di Felice and other sources say he was born 27 May 1938.) |
| Žaja, Ivan | 14500450 | 1965-07-29 | Aržano | | 2001 | Croatia | M | |
| Zajić, Milan | 912336 | 1999-01-11 | Kruševac | | 2016 | Serbia | M | title application |
| Zakharevich, Igor | 4107969 | 1963-07-14 | | 2008-08-10 | 2000 | Russia | M | |
| Zakhartsov, Viacheslav V. | 4115333 | 1968-03-30 | Omsk | | 2007 | Russia | M | title application |
| Zakhartsov, Vladimir | 4145097 | 1997-01-30 | Rostov-on-Don | | 2019 | Russia | M | title application |
| Zambrana, Osvaldo | 3300200 | 1981-07-07 | Sucre | | 2007 | Bolivia | M | title application |
| Zanan, Evgeny | 24101940 | 1998-02-05 | Russia | | 2020 | Israel | M | title application |
| Zapata, Alonso | 4400011 | 1958-08-22 | Pereira | | 1984 | Colombia | M | |
| Zaragatski, Ilja | 4655192 | 1985-09-26 | Leningrad | | 2013 | Germany | M | title application |
| Zarnicki, Pablo | 100137 | 1972-11-12 | Bulnes | | 1994 | Argentina | M | |
| Zaw Win Lay | 13000098 | 1963-10-22 | Mandalay | 2014-10-03 | 2000 | Myanmar | M | |
| Zeitlein, Michael | 4655060 | 1947-06-16 | Babruysk | | 1987 | Soviet Union | M | formerly Mikhail Tseitlin; later Russia; currently Germany |
| Zelčić, Robert | 14500310 | 1965-09-21 | Zagreb | | 1997 | Croatia | M | |
| Zemgalis, Elmārs | | 1923-09-09 | Riga | 2014-12-08 | 2003 | Latvia | M | honorary; later United States |
| Zemlyanskii, Ivan | 24249971 | 2010-08-31 | | | 2024 | Russia | M | title application |
| Zeng Chongsheng | 8603847 | 1993-06-10 | Guangdong | | 2013 | China | M | title application |
| Zezulkin, Jurij | 13500147 | 1971-08-16 | Minsk | | 1999 | Belarus | M | currently Poland |
| Zhalmakhanov, Ramazan | 13706357 | 2002 | | | 2024 | Kazakhstan | M | title application |
| Zhang Pengxiang | 8600970 | 1980-06-29 | Tianjin | | 2001 | China | M | |
| Zhang Zhong | 8600694 | 1978-09-05 | Chongqing | | 1998 | China | M | later Singapore; currently China |
| Zhao Jun | 8602522 | 1986-12-12 | Jinan | | 2005 | China | M | title application |
| Zhao, Chenxi | 8611513 | 2002 | | | 2025 | China | M | title application |
| Zhao Xue | 8601283 | 1985-04-06 | Jinan | | 2008 | China | F | title application |
| Zhao, Yuanhe | 8609497 | 2000-11-27 | Harbin | | 2026 | China | M | GM title application; IM title application |
| Zhao Zong-Yuan | 3202534 | 1986-06-26 | Beijing | | 2008 | Australia | M | title application |
| Zherebukh, Yaroslav | 14116804 | 1993-07-14 | Lviv | | 2009 | Ukraine | M | title application (Note: Zherebukh's GM application lists his birthday as 14 September 1993, but Di Felice and his IM application have 14 July.); currently United States |
| Zhigalko, Andrey | 13502247 | 1985-09-18 | Minsk | | 2006 | Belarus | M | title application |
| Zhigalko, Sergei | 13502956 | 1989-03-28 | Minsk | | 2007 | Belarus | M | title application |
| Zhou Jianchao | 8603537 | 1988-06-11 | Shanghai | | 2006 | China | M | currently United States |
| Zhou Weiqi | 8601674 | 1986-10-01 | Changzhou | | 2009 | China | M | title application |
| Zhu Chen | 8600546 | 1976-03-16 | Wenzhou | | 2001 | China | F | Women's World Champion 2001–2004; currently Qatar |
| Zhu Jiner | 8608059 | 2002-11-16 | Jiaxing | | 2023 | China | F | title application |
| Zhukova, Natalia | 14101513 | 1979-06-05 | Dresden | | 2010 | Ukraine | F | title application (Note: Zhukova's GM application lists her birthday as 5 May 1979, but Di Felice has 5 June.) |
| Ziatdinov, Raset | 2015323 | 1958-12-27 | | | 2005 | United States | M | title application |
| Zierk, Steven | 2034255 | 1993-08-27 | Mountain View, California | | 2018 | United States | M | title application |
| Zifroni, Dov | 2800659 | 1976-02-17 | | | 1999 | Israel | M | |
| Zilberman, Yaacov | 2801612 | 1954-05-26 | | | 1998 | Israel | M | |
| Žilka, Štěpán | 315303 | 1988-11-11 | Litovel | | 2014 | Czech Republic | M | title application |
| Zinchenko, Yaroslav | 14110547 | 1987-02-14 | Dniepropetrovsk | | 2006 | Ukraine | M | title application |
| Ziska, Helgi Dam | 7200595 | 1990-07-27 | Tórshavn | | 2017 | Faroe Islands | M | title application |
| Zlochevsky, Aleksandr | 811424 | 1963-06-25 | Moscow | | 1994 | Russia | M | later Italy; currently Russia |
| Zoler, Dan | 2800705 | 1974-01-10 | | | 2011 | Israel | M | title application (Note: Di Felice gives Zoler's birthday as 19 January 1974, but his GM title application has 10 January.) |
| Zontakh, Andrey | 14101130 | 1970-11-04 | | | 1997 | Ukraine | M | |
| Zubarev, Alexander | 14104385 | 1979-12-17 | | | 2002 | Ukraine | M | |
| Zubov, Oleksandr | 14109409 | 1983-04-04 | | | 2011 | Ukraine | M | title application |
| Zverev, Lev | 24250775 | 2010 | | | 2026 | FIDE | M | GM title application |
| Zvjaginsev, Vadim | 4113403 | 1976-08-18 | Moscow | | 1994 | Russia | M | |

== Revoked titles ==
FIDE titles including the grandmaster title are valid for life, but FIDE regulations allow a title to be revoked for "use of a FIDE title or rating to subvert the ethical principles of the title or rating system" or if a player is found to have violated the anti-cheating regulations in a tournament on which the title application was based.

Revoked GM Title Awards
| Name | FIDE ID | Born | Died | Year | Revoked | Federations | Sex | Notes |
|---|---|---|---|---|---|---|---|---|
| Crișan, Alexandru | 1201271 | 1962-07-31 | | 1993 | 2015 | Romania | M | Falsified tournament reports; Date of title revocation is unclear (Note: Although it was recommended that Crișan's title be revoked in 2001, he was still listed as a grandmaster in FIDE's official rating list until July 2015. FIDE made no announcement when adjusting his rating downwards and de-listing his title in August 2015. However, the rating deduction was retroactively applied from October 2001. According to Di Felice, all titles (FM, IM, and GM) were revoked in 2015.) |
| Nigalidze, Gaioz | 13603078 | 1989-04-24 | | 2014 | 2015 | Georgia | M | FIDE Ethics Commission Case n. 7/2015; title application |
| Rausis, Igors | 11600098 | 1961-04-07 | 2024-03-28 | 1992 | 2019 | Latvia • Bangladesh • Czech Republic | M | FIDE Ethics Commission Case n. 8/2019 |
| Shevchenko, Kirill | 14129574 | 2002-09-22 | | 2017 | 2025 | Ukraine • Romania | M | FIDE report |

== See also ==
- List of chess players by peak FIDE rating
- List of grandmasters for chess composition
