= List of Azerbaijani chess players =

This is a complete list of Azerbaijani chess title-holders as of October 2019.

== Grandmasters ==
- Fərid Abbasov
- Nicat Abasov
- Cəmil Ağamalıyev
- Cahangir Ağarəhimov
- Vugar Asadli
- Rəşad Babayev
- Rüfət Bağırov
- Vasif Durarbəyli
- Vüqar Həşimov (deceased)
- Aydın Hüseynov (deceased)
- Qədir Hüseynov
- Rəsul İbrahimov
- Elmar Məhərrəmov
- Nicat Məmmədov
- Rauf Məmmədov
- Şəhriyar Məmmədyarov
- Azər Mirzəyev
- Namiq Quliyev
- Sərxan Quliyev
- Teymur Rəcəbov
- Eltac Səfərli
- Aydin Suleymanli
- Gövhər Beydullayeva
- Vugar Rasulov

== International Masters ==
- Orxan Abdulov
- Kamal Ağayev
- Nicat Ağayev
- Anar Allahveridyev
- Talib Babayev
- İlqar Bacarani
- Sənan Dövlətov
- Rauf Hacılı
- Ulvi Alibeyli
- Misrəddin İsgəndərov
- İzzət Kənan
- Cavad Məhərrəmzadə
- Ayaz Məmmədov
- Rəhim Qasımov
- Loğman Quliyev
- Vüqar Rəsulov
- Bəhruz Rzayev
- Ülvi Sadıqov
- Fikrət Sideifzadə
- Asif Yəqubi
- Məhəmməd Zülfüqarlı
- Vüqar Salamov

== Women Grandmasters ==
- Elmira Əliyeva
- Ağasıyeva Fidan
- Xəyalə İsgəndərova
- Gülnar Məmmədova
- Türkan Məmmədyarova
- Zeynəb Məmmədyarova
- Günay Məmmədzadə
- Kazımova Nərmin
- İsmayılova Pərvanə
- İlahə Qədimova
- Aynur Sofiyeva
- Nərgiz Umudova

== Women International Masters ==
- Nərmin Məmmədova

== See also ==
- Chess in Azerbaijan
- Azerbaijan Chess Federation
- List of Azerbaijanis
- List of chess players
