= Azerbaijan Chess Federation =

Governing body of chess in Azerbaijan

Azerbaijan Chess Federation Azərbaycan Şahmat Federasiyası
- Abbreviation: AŞF
- Formation: 1920 (1992)
- Headquarters: Xaqani küçəsi 1, Baku
- Region served: Azerbaijan
- President: Mahir Mammedov
- Affiliations: FIDE, European Chess Union
- Website: www.chess.az

The Azerbaijan Chess Federation (Azerbaijani: Azərbaycan Şahmat Federasiyası, AŞF) is the governing chess organization in Azerbaijan and is affiliated to the World Chess Federation FIDE. The Azerbaijan Chess Federation was founded in 1920 when Azerbaijan became a member of the Soviet Union as the Azerbaijan SSR the same year, and was reorganized in 1992, after Azerbaijan attained its independence with the dissolution of the Soviet Union, and became a member of FIDE the same year. Its headquarters are in Baku.

Elman Rustamov was the President of the Azerbaijan Chess Federation from 2007 until 2021.

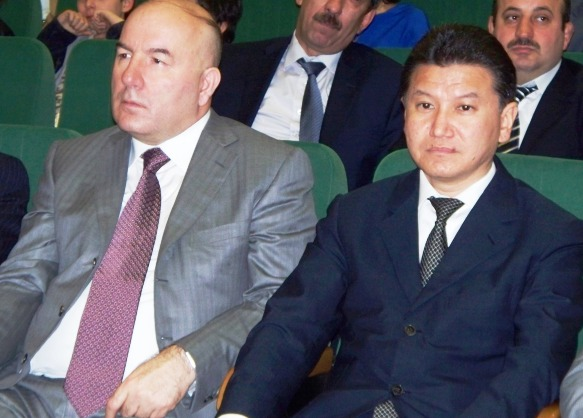
President of the Azerbaijan Chess Federation Elman Rustamov (left) with the President of the World Chess Federation FIDE, Kirsan Ilyumzhinov.

== Executive committee ==
The executive committee includes:

- President – Mahir Mammedov
- First Vice-president – Faiq Hasanov
- Vice-president – Seymur Talibov
- General Secretary – Ilaha Gadimova

== Members ==
Its members include:

Grandmasters

- Vüqar Həşimov
- Şəhriyar Məmmədyarov
- Rauf Məmmədov
- Qədir Hüseynov
- Nicat Məmmədov
- Azər Mirzəyev
- Eltac Səfərli
- Fərid Abbasov
- Rəsul İbrahimov
- Rəşad Babayev
- Namiq Quliyev
- Elmar Məhərrəmov
- Sərxan Quliyev
- Cəmil Ağamalıyev
- Rüfət Bağırov
- Aydın Hüseynov
- Teimour Radjabov

International Masters

- Abasov Nicat
- Vasif Durarbəyli
- Vüqar Rəsulov
- Loğman Quliyev
- Anar Allahveridyev
- Elmir Hüseynov
- Sənan Dövlətov
- Fikrət Sideifzadə
- Rəhim Qasımov
- İlqar Bacarani

Women Grandmasters

- İlahə Qədimova
- Zeynəb Məmmədyarova
- Türkan Məmmədyarova
- Firuzə Vəlixanlı
- Aynur Sofiyeva

Women International Masters

- Kazımova Nərmin
- Nərgiz Umudova
- Xəyalə İsgəndərova
- Elmira Əliyeva
- Məmmədova Gülnar
- İsmayılova Pərvanə
- Ağasıyeva Fidan

== Competitions ==
The federation organizes the following chess competitions:

- Azerbaijani Chess Championship
- Azerbaijan Women's Chess Championship
- Azerbaijan Children's Chess Championship

== International events ==
- FIDE Grand-Prix 2008 (April 19 – May 6, 2008) in Baku
- 42nd Chess Olympiad (2016) in Baku

== See also ==
- Chess in Azerbaijan
- List of Azerbaijani chess players
- Fédération Internationale des Échecs (FIDE)
