= Chess in Azerbaijan =

Overview of Azerbaijan's participation in professional chess

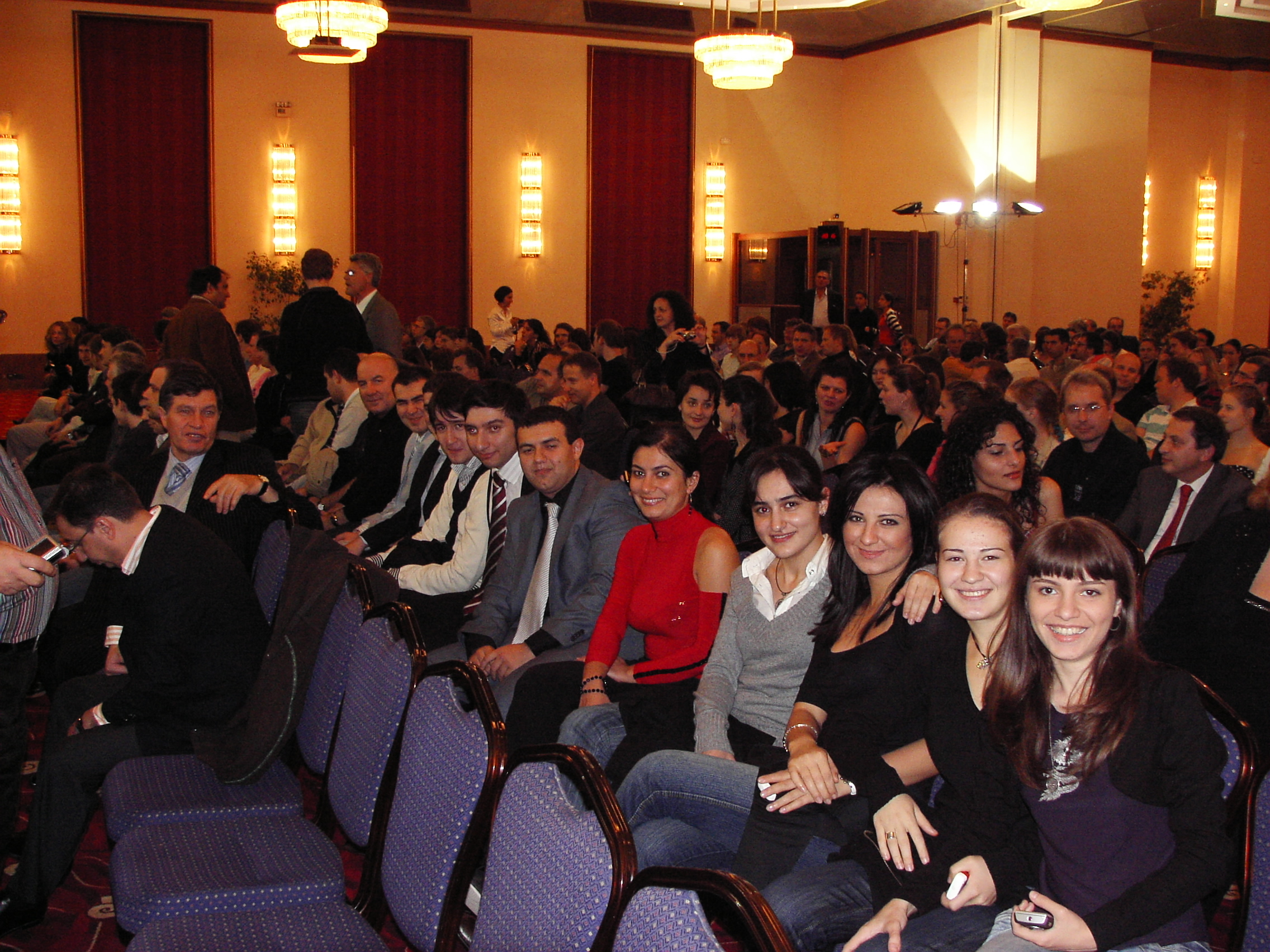
Azerbaijan's National men's and women's teams in the European Championship 2007

Chess is one of the most popular sports in Azerbaijan, where it is governed by the Azerbaijan Chess Federation (ACF). On May 5, 2009 Azerbaijani president Ilham Aliyev, who is also the chairman of the National Olympic Committee, signed an executive order initiating a state-supported chess development program, covering the years 2009–2014.

== History of chess in Azerbaijan ==
=== Azerbaijan as a member of the USSR ===
Organized chess began in Azerbaijan shortly after the creation of the Azerbaijan Soviet Socialist Republic in 1920, and the game soon became widespread. The first chess column appeared in the newspaper Bakinsky Rabochy in the early 1920s. In 1923 the first Baku championship took place, won by brothers Vladimir and Mikhail Makogonov. In 1924, a conference of Komsomol (Young Communist League) and trade unions set about promoting chess, leading to the participation of Fedor Duz-Khotimirsky and Nikolai Grigoriev in a tournament in Baku. Towards the end of the 1920s, a number of strong young players emerged, including the Sarychev and Danilov brothers, O. Rostovtsev, N. Doktorsky, K. Selimkhanov and A. Bilibin. Lectures and simultaneous exhibitions stimulated interest in chess in Azerbaijan. On May 2–3, 1929, a match between teams from Baku and Tbilisi was held on 8 boards in Baku.

In 1934 the first Azerbaijani Championship took place. This was won by Selimkhanov, who in 1935 became chairman of the Azerbaijan Chess Organization. in 1936 the first Women's Championship was held, won by Rozhdestvenskaya. In 1936, A. Polisskaya of Baku became women's champion of the South Caucasus. In 1938, a women's chess school was opened at the Baku Chess and Checkers Club.

During the Second World War, there was little competitive chess in Azerbaijan. In 1942 there was a match between Salo Flohr and Vladimir Makogonov in Baku; the match was abandoned after 10 games with Makogonov leading 5½-4½. In June–July 1943, Flohr won a double round tournament with a score of 5/8 ahead of Makogonov, David Bronstein, Archil Ebralidze and Suren Abramyan. The championship of the Republic of Azerbaijan was held annually from 1947.

The active development of chess in Azerbaijan began in the 1950s. The Baku Pioneer Palace Chess Club, led by Suren Abramyan, played an important role in the development of junior chess. Sports clubs such as Neftchi, Spartak, Nauka, Energiya, Medik, Iskra and others had active chess departments. These initiatives also contributed to the success of Vladimir Makogonov, Azerbaijan's leading player. The Azerbaijan women's championships has been held regularly since 1960.

In the 1950s, A.Zeynalli, S.Khalilbeyli (the 1st Azerbaijani master on chess) and V.Bagirov (repeated republic champion) became the leaders of the Republic chess-players. Elmar Magerramov, F.Sideifzade, O.Pavlenko, B.Levitas, L.Listengarten, O.Privorotskiy, G.Govashelishvili, L.Guldin, A.Morgulev and R.Korsunskiy won in championships. E.Sardarov, A.Shakhtakhtinskiy, R.Amirkhanov and D.Abakarov participated in competitions successfully.

In 1970-1980's, advance a number of young chess-players: A.Huseynov (champion of the South Caucasus, 1982), A.Shakarov, A.Velibeyov, S.Suleymanov, K.Askaryan, A.Avshalumov, Kh.Rasulov, S.Guliyev, Jabbarov brothers, G.Gojayev and others. In the 1980s, Garry Kasparov achieved great successes and became the world champion. T.Zatulovskaya, M.Martirosova, N.Avanesova (Karakashyan), A.Tokarjevskaya, A.Gorbuleva, A.Pirbudagova, Kh.Nabiyeva, S.Alasgarova, V.Jebrayilova, N.Agababayan, A.Saakova, E.Aliyeva, A.Sofiyeva (Champion of the USSR among girls, 1986) successfully participated in championships and other competitions. Women's national team of the Republic was the winner of a Sport Contest of the USSR nations (1986).

Besides the chess circle of Baku Palace of Pioneers and Pupils named after Y.Gagarin (including alumni – Kasparov, Bagirov, Zatulovskaya, Maharramov and others), such unions as “Spartak”, “Burevestnik”, “Neftchi”, “Dinamo” and others in rural areas- “Mehsul” union, which opened chess clubs were also engaged in chess. The 1st Baku Children and Youth Chess School of Azerbaijan (since 1982-Republic sport school of chess of the Ministry of Education of Azerbaijan) was established in 1968. From the late 1970s, more than 50 sport schools for children and youth were opened in districts of the Republic. Annual chess festivals of pupils are held since 1982.

In Baku were held great All-union and international competitions: 29th and 49th Men's championships of the country (1961–1972); 23rd Women's championship (1963); 20th international tournament of the Central Chess Club of the USSR; Baku tournaments. National team of Azerbaijan participated in team championships of the USSR: in 1951-the 5th; 1958-10th; 1960-the 9th; 1952-10th; 1969 and 1972 – the 9th; 1981-14th; 1985-the 7th and 8th places. Team of the Republic participated in sport competitions of the USSR nations: in 1959, 1963, 1967 – the 9th; 1975 – the 11th; 1979 the 13th; 1983 – the 11th; 1986 - the 14th (men) and 1st places (women).

=== Modern times ===
Since Azerbaijan gained its independence, Azerbaijani chess players have achieved high results in various international competitions, World and European championships. In 1992, the national team of women for the first time at the World Chess Olympiad in Manila, Philippines represented independent Azerbaijan and ranked 7th among 67 teams. The women team won bronze medals at the European Championship held in Debrecen, Hungary in 1993. The national team of men won bronze medals in 2007 in European Championship held in Greece. Men's team won the title of “Europe’s strongest team” in Serbia in 2009, then won silver medals in 2011 in Greece and in 2013 in Poland. In 2012 and 2014, the men's team “SOCAR-Azerbaijan” won inter-club European Championships twice. Azerbaijani grandmasters Shahriyar Mammadyarov, Teymur Radjabov and Vugar Hashimov managed to rise to the 4th and 6th places in the world rankings.

On May 5, 2009, the President Ilham Aliyev signed an Order to approve the “State Program for the Development of Chess in Azerbaijan for 2009-2014” to increase the country's international role in this area by ensuring the implementation of state policy in the field of chess, further development of chess and its infrastructure in the country, training of international chess players, coaches, arbiters and other chess specialists. In the framework of this State Program, Chess Faculty has been launched at the Azerbaijan State Academy of Physical Culture and Sport, “Chess” classes started to be taught in more than 70 schools in Azerbaijan.

Grandmaster Teymur Radjabov became the first owner of the World Chess Cup in the history of Azerbaijan on October 4, 2019, in Khanty-Mansiysk, Russia.

== Individual statistics ==
As of October 2018

FIDE, the World Chess Federation, lists 24 active Azerbaijani grandmasters, 30 international masters and a total of 151 titled players.

=== Open ===
The Top 10 Azerbaijani grandmasters as of August 2022 are listed below.

Azerbaijani players in FIDE

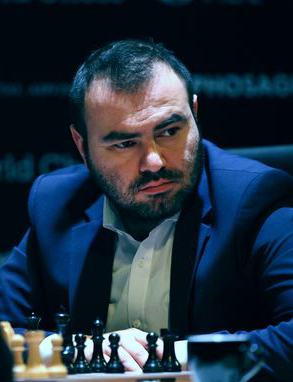
Shakhriyar Mamedyarov (10)

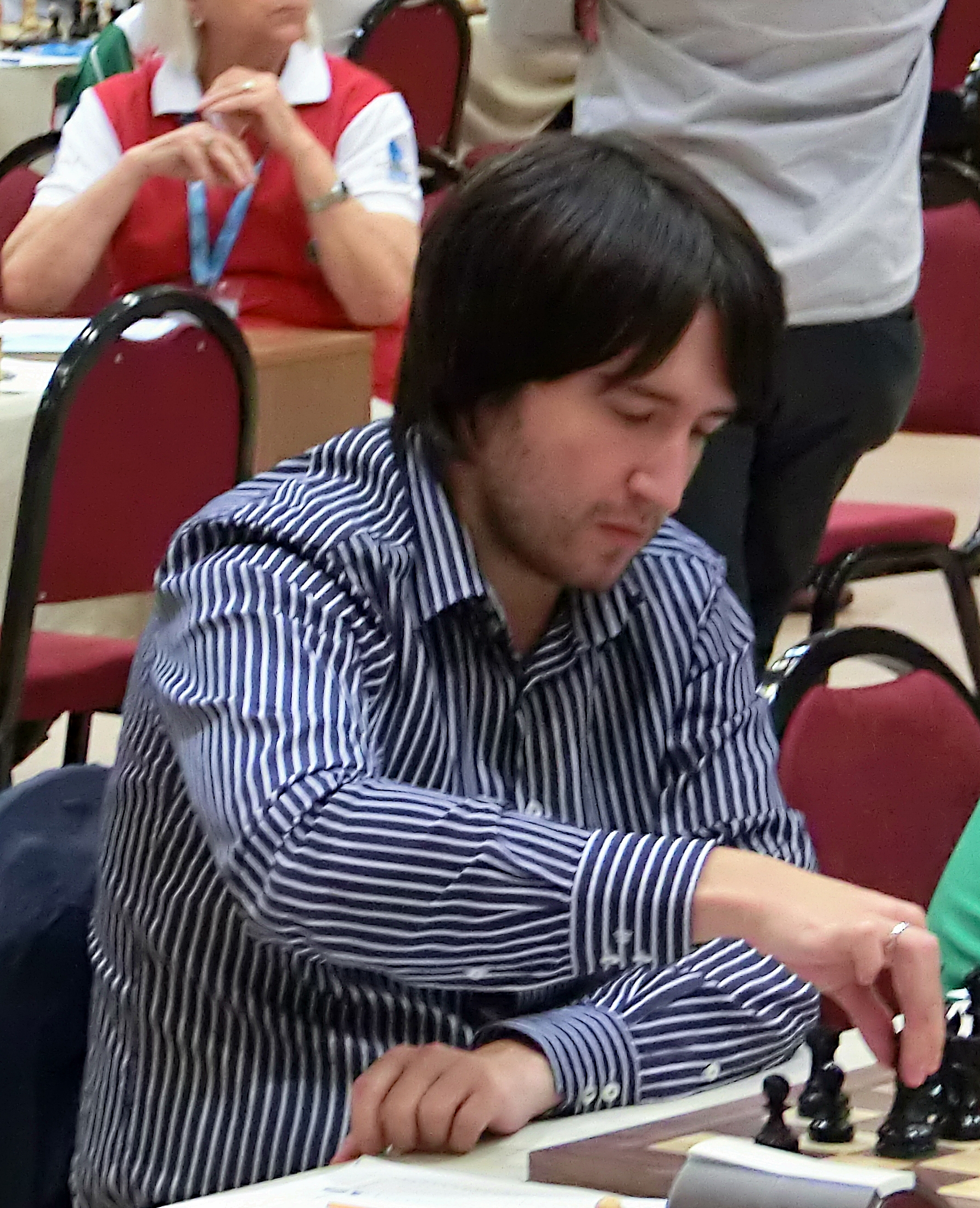
Teimour Radjabov (15)

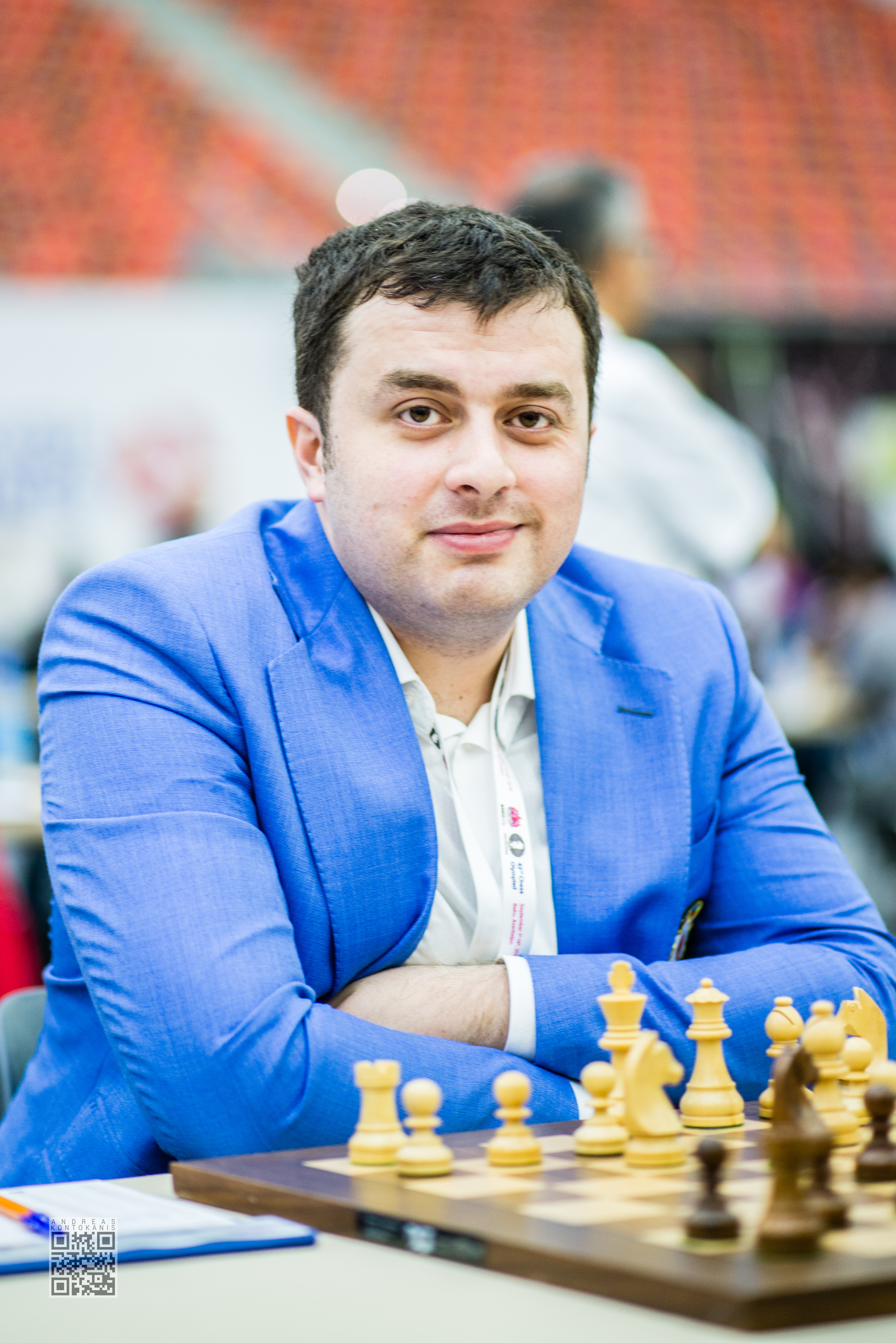
Gadir Guseinov (78)

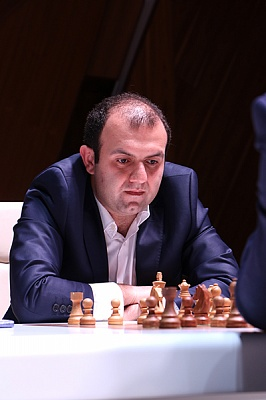
Rauf Mamedov (93)

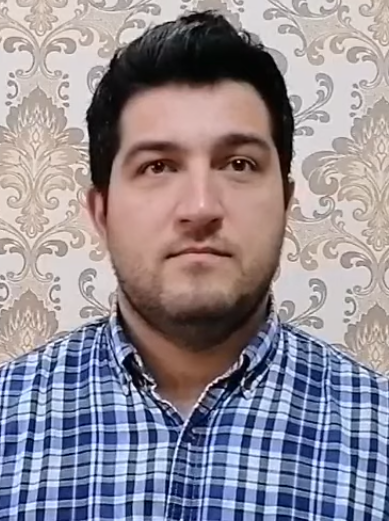
Vasif Durarbayli (118)

#	Player	Birth year	GM Title	Rating	World rank (Note: active players only)
1	Shakhriyar Mamedyarov	1985	2002	2758	10
2	Teimour Radjabov	1987	2001	2747	15
3	Gadir Guseinov	1986	2002	2668	78
4	Rauf Mamedov	1988	2004	2656	93
5	Vasif Durarbayli	1992	2010	2638	118
6	Nijat Abasov	1995	2011	2633	129
7	Eltaj Safarli	1992	2008	2602	203
8	Misratdin Iskandarov	1995	2020	2589	245
9	Nidjat Mamedov	1985	2006	2589	246
10	Vugar Asadli	2001	2019	2575	299

=== Women ===
The Top 10 Azerbaijani women chess players as of August 2022 are listed below.

Azerbaijani women players in FIDE

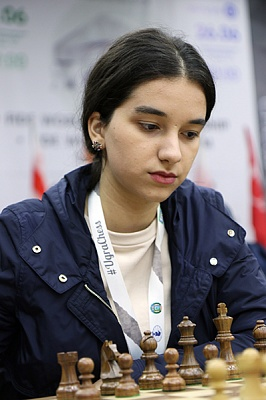
Gunay Mammadzada (1000)

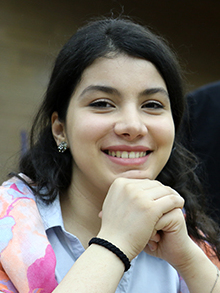
Ulviyya Fataliyeva (1668)

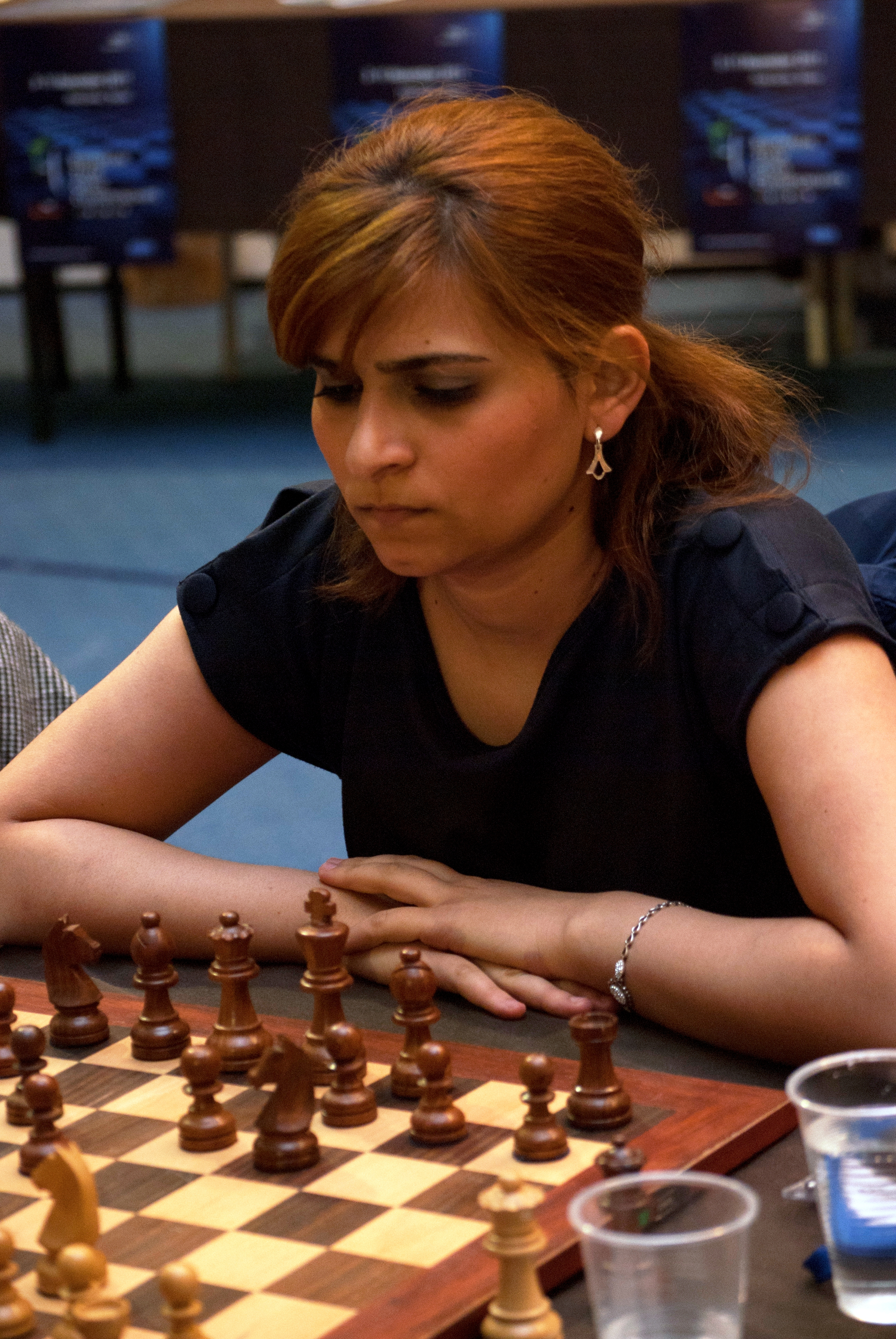
Gulnar Mammadova (2350)

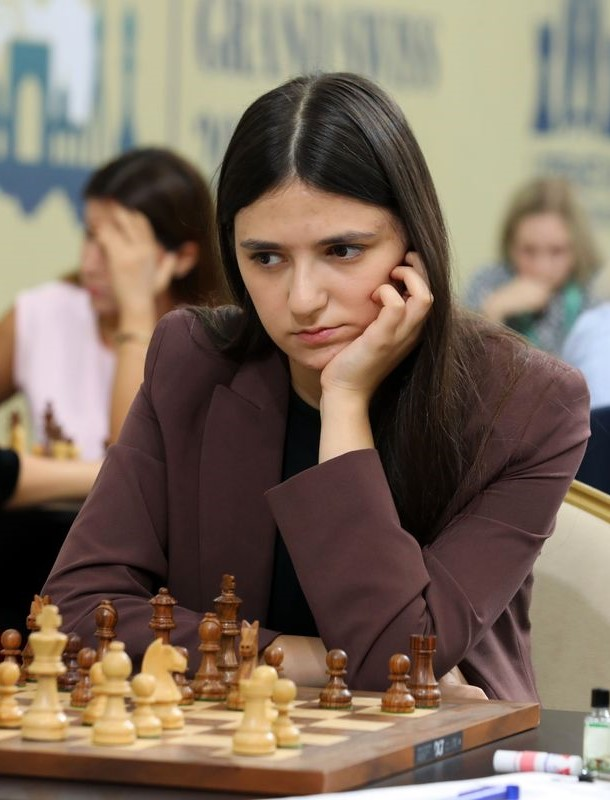
Khanim Balajayeva (3134)

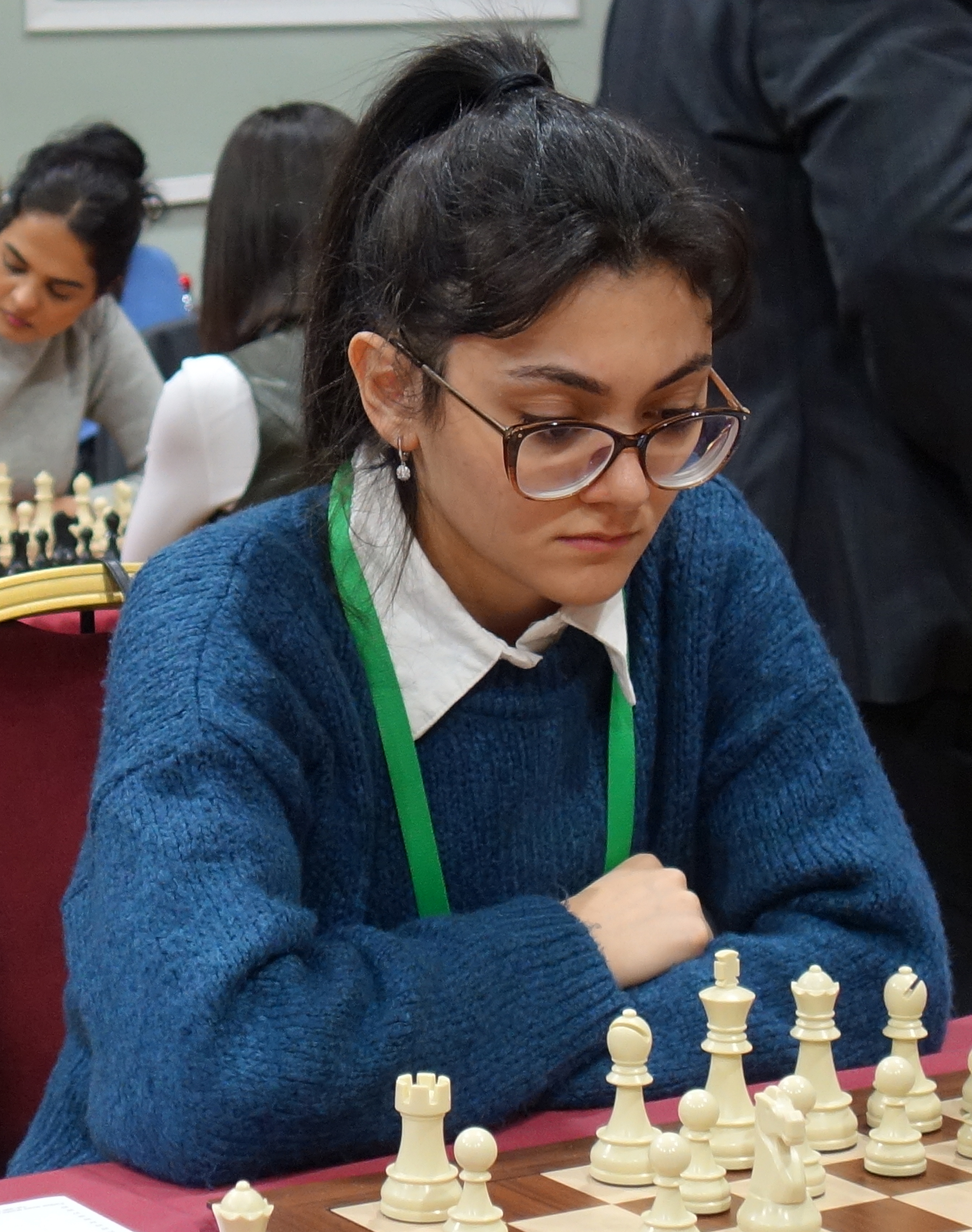
Govhar Beydullayeva (3253)

#	Player	Birth year	Title (year)	Rating	World rank (Note: active female players only)
1	Gunay Mammadzada	2000	IM (2018)	2466	1000
2	Ulviyya Fataliyeva	1996	WGM (2017)	2413	1668
3	Gulnar Mammadova	1991	IM (2017)	2380	2350
4	Khanim Balajayeva	2001	WGM (2019)	2344	3134
5	Govhar Beydullayeva	2003	WGM (2022)	2339	3253
6	Nargiz Umudova	1989	WGM (2015)	2280	5005
7	Zeinab Mamedyarova	1983	WGM	2249	6140
8	Turkan Mamedyarova	1989	WGM (2007)	2244	6340
9	Narmin Kazimova	1993	WGM (2015)	2198	8454
10	Khayala Abdulla	1993	WGM (2015)	2183	9268

== Team records ==
=== Chess Olympiads ===
Men's

Year	Event	Location	Players	Position	Ref
1994	31st Chess Olympiad	Moscow, Russia	S.Guliyev, Hajily, N.Guliyev, Bedgarani, Ibrahimov, Allahverdiyev	36	
1998	33rd Chess Olympiad	Elista, Russia	Huseynov, Guliyev, Hajily, Allahverdiyev, Mirzoev, Maherramzade	43	
2000	34th Chess Olympiad	Istanbul, Turkey	Zulfugarli, Maherramzade, Mirzoev, Bagirov, Mamedyarov, Mammadov	46	
2002	35th Chess Olympiad	Bled, Slovenia	Radjabov, Gashimov, Huseynov, Mamedyarov, Ibrahimov, Maherramzade	30	
2004	36th Chess Olympiad	Calviá, Spain	Radjabov, Gashimov, Huseynov, Mamedyarov, Mamedov, Ibrahimov	22	
2006	37th Chess Olympiad	Turin, Italy	Radjabov, Gashimov, Huseynov, Guliyev, Mamedov, Durarbeyli	24	
2008	38th Chess Olympiad	Dresden, Germany	Radjabov, Gashimov, Huseynov, Mamedov, Mamedyarov	6	
2010	39th Chess Olympiad	Khanty-Mansiysk, Russia	Radjabov, Safarli, Huseynov, Mamedov, Mamedyarov	12	
2012	40th Chess Olympiad	Istanbul, Turkey	Radjabov, Safarli, Huseynov, Mamedov, Mamedyarov	10	
2014	41st Chess Olympiad	Tromsø, Norway	Radjabov, Safarli, Huseynov, Mamedov, Mamedyarov	5	
2016	42nd Chess Olympiad	Baku, Azerbaijan	Sh.Mamedyarov, T.Radjabov, R.Mamedov, A.Naiditsch, E.Safarli	12	

Women's

Year	Event	Location	Players	Position	Ref
1992	30th Chess Olympiad	Manila, Philippines	Sofiyeva, Velikhanli, Kadimova, Babayeva	7	
1994	31st Chess Olympiad	Moscow, Russia	Sofiyeva, Velikhanli, Kadimova, Babayeva	18	
1998	33rd Chess Olympiad	Elista, Russia	Aliyeva, Mammadyarova, Shukurova	30	
2000	34th Chess Olympiad	Istanbul, Turkey	Babayeva, Aliyeva, Shukurova, Mammadyarova	21	
2002	35th Chess Olympiad	Bled, Slovenia	Velikhanli, Shukurova, Z.Mammadyarova, T.Mammadyarova	8	
2004	36th Chess Olympiad	Calviá, Spain	Mammadyarova, Shukurova, Velikhanli, Khudaverdiyeva	22	
2006	37th Chess Olympiad	Turin, Italy	Isgandarova, Umudova, Agasiyeva, Avdeeva	51	
2008	38th Chess Olympiad	Dresden, Germany	Z.Mammadyarova, T.Mammadyarova, Umudova, Isgandarova, Kazimova	31	
2010	39th Chess Olympiad	Khanty-Mansiysk, Russia	Z.Mammadyarova, T.Mammadyarova, Mammadova, Isgandarova, Umudova	7	
2012	40th Chess Olympiad	Istanbul, Turkey	Z.Mammadyarova, T.Mammadyarova, Mammadova, Isgandarova, Umudova	28	
2014	41st Chess Olympiad	Tromsø, Norway	Z.Mammadyarova, T.Mammadyarova, Mammadova, Abdulla, Ibrahimova	23	
2016	42nd Chess Olympiad	Baku, Azerbaijan	Z.Mamedyarova, G.Mammadzada, G.Mammadova, A.Hojjatova, N.Kazimova	8	

=== World Team Championships ===
Men's

Year	Location	Players	Position	Ref
2010	Bursa, Turkey	Radjabov, Mammadov, Huseynov, Mamedov, Mamedyarov, Gashimov	4	
2011	Ningbo, China	Radjabov, Huseynov, Mamedov, Mamedyarov, Gashimov	7	
2013	Antalya, Turkey	Mamedov, Safarli, Huseynov, Mammadov, Durarbayli	8	

=== European Team Championships ===
Men's

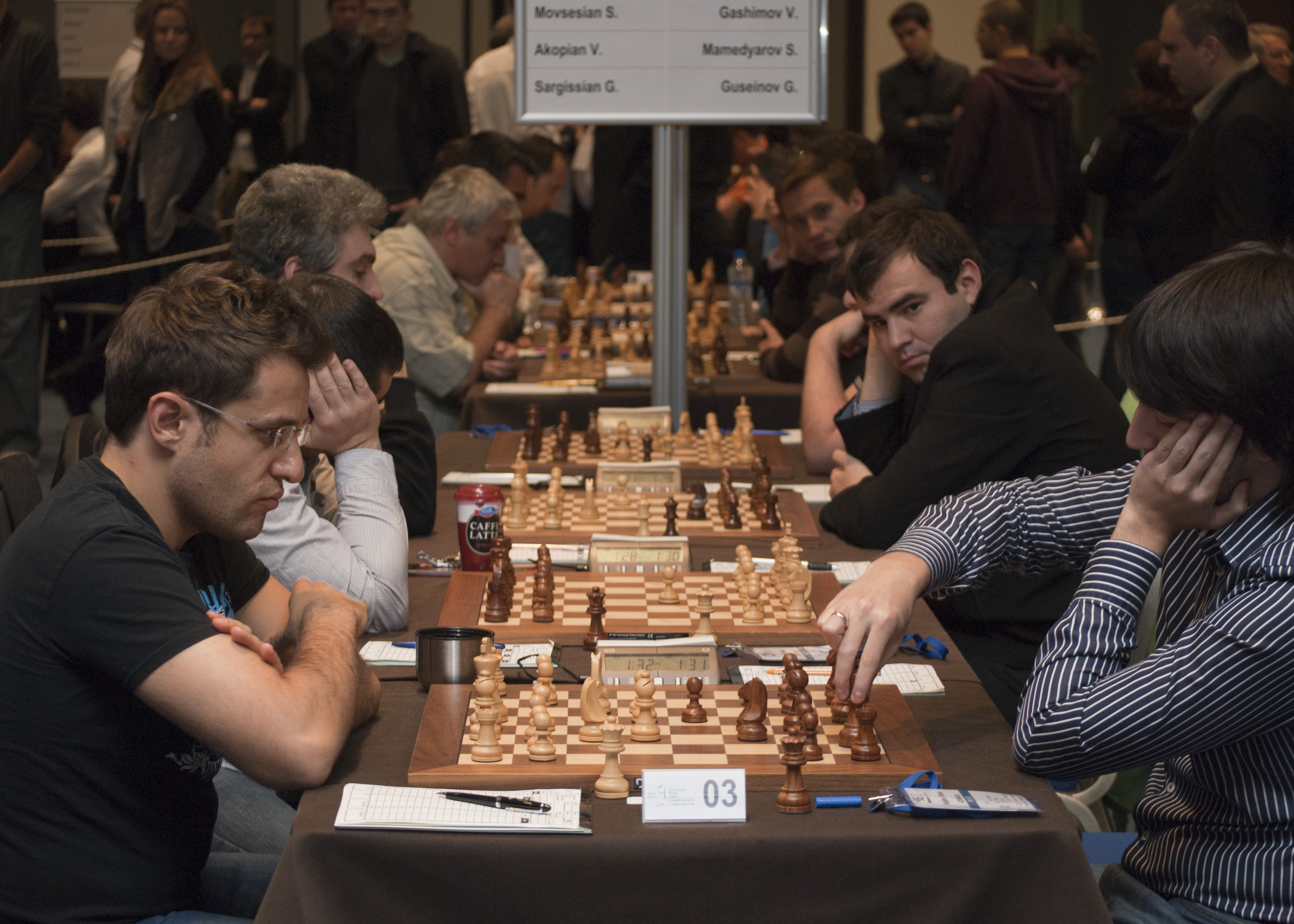
Armenia vs Azerbaijan at the 2011 European Team Chess Championship. Levon Aronian (left) and Teimour Radjabov (right) pictured in the foreground.

Year	Location	Players	Position	Ref
1992	Debrecen, Hungary		40	
1997	Pula, Croatia	Guliyev, Huseynov, Allakhverdiev, Hajily, Sideif-sade	15	
1999	(Georgia (country)) Batumi, Georgia	Bagirov, Hajily, Zulfugarli, Ibrahimov	22	
2001	León, Spain	Radjabov, Gashimov, Ibrahimov, Mamedyarov	22	
2003	Plovdiv, Bulgaria	Radjabov, Mamedyarov, Huseynov, Ibrahimov, Sideif-sade	16	
2005	Gothenburg, Sweden	Radjabov, Mamedyarov, Huseynov, Gashimov, Guliyev	9	
2007	Heraklion, Greece	Radjabov, Mamedyarov, Huseynov, Gashimov, Mamedov	3rd place, bronze medalist(s)	
2009	Novi Sad, Serbia	Radjabov, Mamedyarov, Huseynov, Gashimov, Mamedov	1st place, gold medalist(s)	
2011	Porto Carras, Greece	Radjabov, Mamedyarov, Huseynov, Gashimov, Safarli	2nd place, silver medalist(s)	
2013	Warsaw, Poland	Radjabov, Mamedyarov, Huseynov, Safarli, Mamedov	1st place, gold medalist(s)	

Women's

Year	Location	Players	Position	Ref
1992	Debrecen, Hungary	Velikhanli, Kadimova	3rd place, bronze medalist(s)	
1997	Pula, Croatia	Velikhanli, Aliyeva, Kadimova	12	
1999	(Georgia (country)) Batumi, Georgia	Babayeva, Shukurova	13	
2001	León, Spain	Z.Mamedyarova, Shukurova	8	
2003	Plovdiv, Bulgaria	Z.Mamedyarova, T.Mamedyarova	17	
2007	Heraklion, Greece	Z.Mamedyarova, T.Mamedyarova, Kadimova, Umudova, Isgandarova	10	
2009	Novi Sad, Serbia	Z.Mamedyarova, T.Mamedyarova, Kazimova, Mammadova, Isgandarova	4	
2011	Porto Carras, Greece	Z.Mamedyarova, T.Mamedyarova, Kazimova, Mammadova, Umudova	20	
2013	Warsaw, Poland	Z.Mamedyarova, T.Mamedyarova, Abdulla, Mammadova, Umudova	20	

=== Correspondence chess ===
Correspondence chess competitions are held from the mid 1970s. In 1976, a commission on correspondence game was established under the Chess Federation of Azerbaijan; 4 championships were held in Azerbaijan (winners – L.Voloshin (1974–1975); S.Vdovin (1977–1978); V.Tsaturyan (1981–1983); S.Serebryakov (1984–1985)). Baku citizen P.Atyeshev took the 1st place at the 2nd championship of the USSR and in correspondence he became the champion of the 3rd Olympiad as a member of the USSR team. Azerbaijani team took the 11th place among 13 teams in the 5th championship of the USSR (in the 6th championship 10-11th places among 17, in 7th championship the 3rd place among 17 teams).

=== Chess composition ===
Initial activity of the chess composition in Azerbaijan is connected to A.Gurvich. In the 1920s, problems and endgames of Sarychev brothers were published in “Bakinskiy Rabochiy” newspaper. In 1970, a Commission on Composition was created under the Chess Federation of Azerbaijan. Its first chairman was master A.Sarychev. The following people won in the championships of Azerbaijan:

- The 1st (1974) – N.Gulamov - twomover, A.Sarychev - endgames;
- The 2nd (1974–1977) – Gulamov - twomover, R.Alovsatzade - threemover, S.Khachaturov - moremover, Sarychev - endgames;
- The 3rd (open, 1977–1979) – V.Melnichenko - twomovement, A.Kalinin - threemover, A.Popandopulo - moremover, Alovsatzade - helpmate, M.Vahidov – selfmate;
- The 4th (1983) – Rauf Adigozalzade – twomovers and moremovers, Z.Eyvazova – threemovers, Sarychev – endgames;
- The 5th (open, 1985) – S.Shedey – twomovers, V.Kopayev – threemovers, Khachaturov – moremovers, G.Nadareishvili – endgames, A.Pankartyev-helpmate and selfmate.

National team of Azerbaijan took the 8th place in the 8th All-Union Team Championship of Chess Compositors (1972–1973), the 9th place in the 9th (1975–1976), 4th place in the 10th (1977–1978), 8th place in the 11th (1981–1982) and 7th place in the 12th (1984–1985).

A number of composers achieved success in the All-Union and international contests: Sarychev (endgames) – the 2nd place in Olympiad in Leipzig (1961) and the 1st place in international contests of such magazines as “New statesman” (1961, 1977), “Shakkelet (1970), “Ceskoslovenski schah” (1977); B.Baday (endgames) – the first place in a contest of “Shahmati v SSSR” (1961) magazine and in a contest to A.Kubbel; Khachaturov – the 1st place in thematic contest of moremoves (1973); E. Yusupov – he 1st place in a contest of the Roman magazine “Revista Romine de shah (1976); Rauf Adigozalzade and Vahidov (twomovers) – the 1st place in international contests of “Student” newspaper (Yugoslavia; 1979–1980) and others; A.Zygalov – the 1st place in international contests of “Tem-64” (France;1979) magazine and in Hungary (1982).

=== Published books ===
The first chess books – “Iqra v shahmati” (Chess game) (1982) and “Nachalniy kurs shahmatnoy iqri”(Essentials of chess game) (1932) by R.Safarova. “Course of chess lections” M.Eyve (1936) and “Chess codex of the USSR” (1938) were also published in Azerbaijani. From March, 1981 a biweekly attachment called “Chess” was published in the Republican newspaper “Sport” in Russian and Azerbaijani languages. Regular chess headings were published in “Kommunist”, “Bakinskiy rabochiy”, “Vishka” newspapers and in district newspapers. Television organizes programs called “Chess club” and “Schools of chess coaches” two times in a month.

=== Chess and Azerbaijani literature ===
Chess took an important place in Azerbaijani literature. A German professor Meier gave explanation to Azerbaijani poet Mahsati Genjevi's rubai about chess, in a book called “Beautiful Mahsati’ published in 1963, in Wiesbaden.

Khagani Shirvani, poet of the 12th century, in his work "Tohfatul Iraqeyn" writes that connection of rooks in chess enables threat and it is very dangerous for an enemy. Chess motifs are also reflected in works of the great classic Azerbaijani literature - Nizami Ganjavi. A frequent tracing of chess game are in all poems included to Khamse. Haji Ali Tebrizi, living in the 14th century, could play chess without looking, simultaneously with four players. He gained a name of the first chess-player, becoming the winner among all strongest chess-players not only in his country and also in the whole empire of Timur. In his “Leyli and Majnun” poem Fuzuli, giving a deep meaning to formation of chess figures and comparing Mejnun with himself wrote that despite Majnun lived in the more earlier historical period there is always a pawn in the world of love, while he is (Fuzuli) the king and despite that the pawn stands in front of the king he prefers to be the pawn and Majnun, who came to life earlier is just a pawn standing in front of the king.

== Azerbaijan's national team of men ==
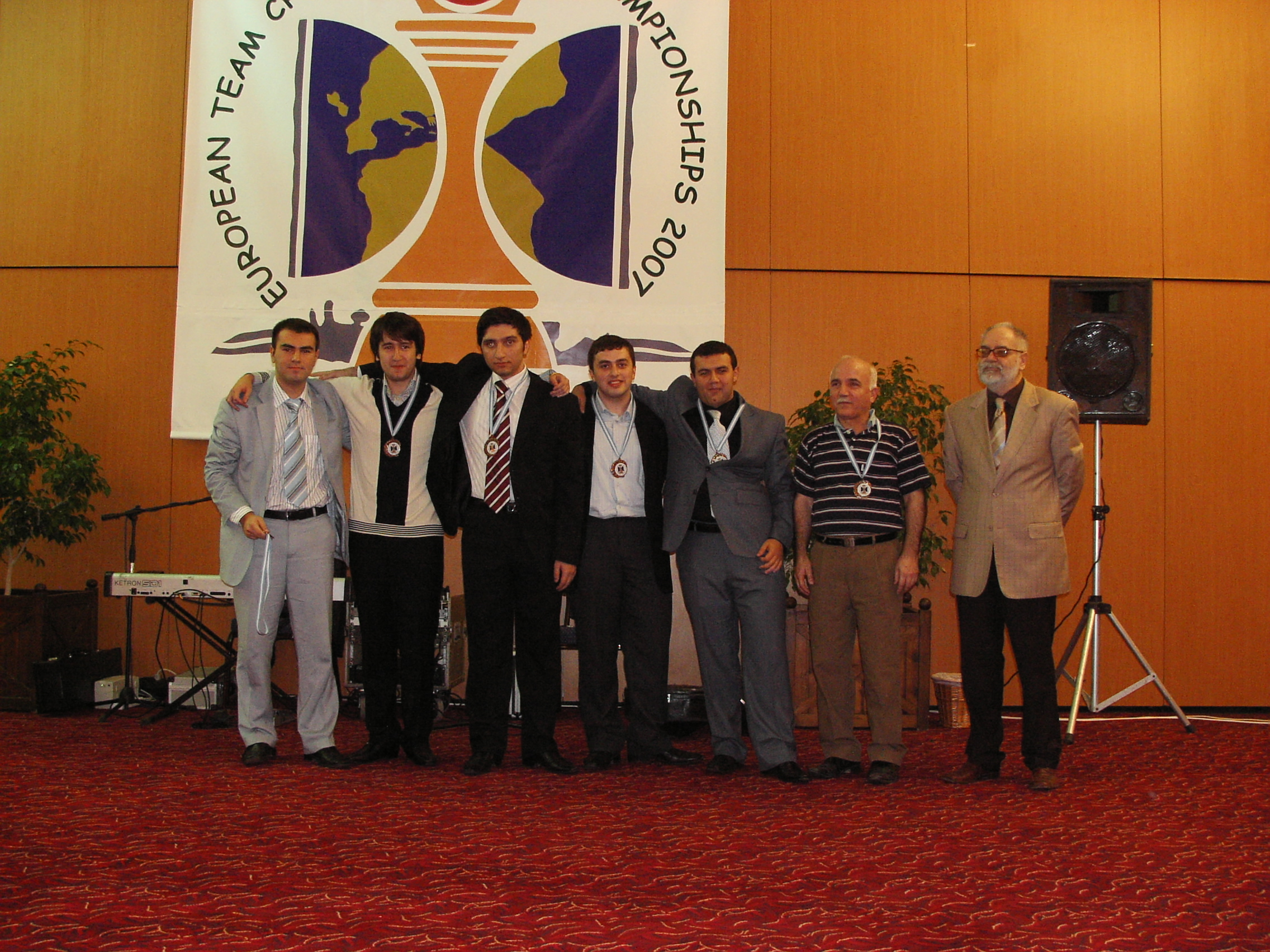
Men's team of Azerbaijan

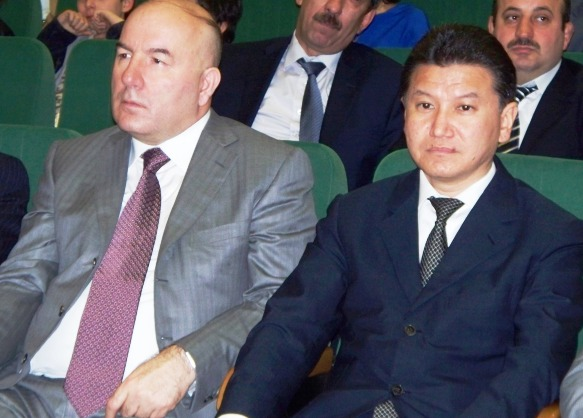
President of the Azerbaijan Chess Federation Elman Rustamov (left) and President of the World Chess Federation FIDE Kirsan Ilyumzhinov.

No.	Participant	Team	Current rating
1	Shakhriyar Mamedyarov	National team of Azerbaijan	2757
2	Teimour Radjabov	National team of Azerbaijan	2715
3	Eltaj Safarli	National team of Azerbaijan	2653
4	Rauf Mamedov	National team of Azerbaijan	2647
5	Qadir Huseynov	National team of Azerbaijan	2607

The National team of Azerbaijan became the third team in the history of chess, which won a match against the combined team of the world. The first similar game was held in 1970, in Belgrade, where the combined team of the USSR beat the combined team of the world with a score of 20,5:19,5. The Soviet chess-players repeated their achievement in 1984, but this time in London, winning the compound team of the world with a score of 21:19. But in 2002, in Moscow, during the third meeting, compound team of Russia yielded to the world grand, where also played Azerbaijani grandmaster Teymur Rajabov with a score of 48:52.

On October 30, 2009 Men's Compound Chess Team of Azerbaijan became a champion of Team championship of Europe in a Serb city Novi Sad. Vugar Gashimov brought victory to the team, after a long struggle with Daniël Stellwagen. The other three parts finished in a draw. As a result, Azerbaijan gained 15 points and outrun Russia with 1 point, winning the world title.

On November 17, 2013 Men's Compound Chess Team of Azerbaijan for the second time in history became champion of Team championship of Europe in a Polish city Warsaw. Azerbaijan played a 2-2 draw against Armenia in the final ninth round of the Open tournament. In a very important match Russia beat France 2.5-1.5. This allowed the Azerbaijani team to set above France in the tournament table and come first. In the final our team gained 14 points. France is second (13 points) and Russia is a bronze winner with its 13 points.

== International chess competitions in Baku ==
=== Baku Grand-Prix 2008 ===
The first series of Grand Prix of 2008-2009's, held in Baku from April 20 to May 6, 2008. Category was 19th. The average rating of its participants was 2717. The following people became winners:

- Vugar Hashimov, Azerbaijan
- Wang Yue, (China) PRC
- Magnus Carlsen, Norway

=== Cup of the President of Azerbaijan ===
A meeting of Azerbaijan's National team against the World's Compound team in which the guests won with a score of 21,5-10,5, was held from May 7 to 9, 2009, on the stage of “Uns” theatre in Baku and was held under the President's Cup dedicated to the memory of Heydar Aliyev. Structures of the teams were the following:

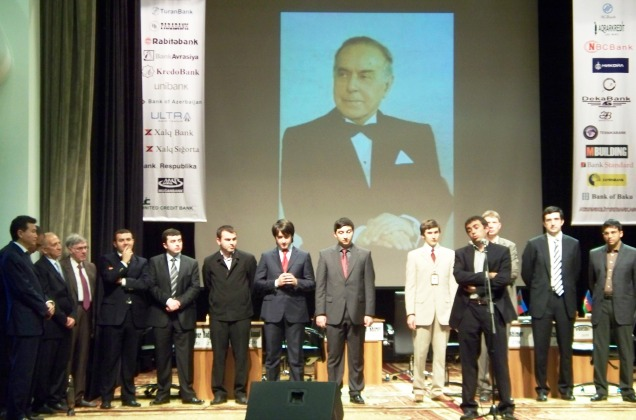
The participants of the tournament on the stage of "Uns" theatre

No.	Participant	Team	Country
1	Teimour Radjabov	National team of Azerbaijan	(Azerbaijan)
2	Vugar Gashimov	National team of Azerbaijan	(Azerbaijan)
3	Shakhriyar Mamedyarov	National team of Azerbaijan	(Azerbaijan)
4	Qadir Huseynov	National team of Azerbaijan	(Azerbaijan)
5	Rauf Mamedov	National team of Azerbaijan	(Azerbaijan)
6	Viswanathan Anand	Combined team of the world (FIDE)	(India)
7	Vladimir Kramnik	Combined team of the world (FIDE)	(Russia)
8	Alexei Shirov	Combined team of the world (FIDE)	(Spain)
9	Sergey Karjakin	Combined team of the world (FIDE)	(Ukraine)

=== Women’s Chess Tournament “Baku-2007” ===
Women's Chess Tournament “Baku 2007” was held in 2007, in Baku, with participation of such famous chess-players as Antoaneta Stefanova from Bulgaria – ex-champion of the world, Kateryna Lahno from Ukraine – twice champion of Europe, Monika Soćko from Poland – winner of team championship of Europe in 2005 and others.

== Literature ==
- Кулиев Ш., Страницы из нашей шахмат истории, Баку, 1966 (на азербайджанском языке);
- Султанов Ч. А., Гасанов Ф. 3., Шахматы в Азербайджане, Баку, 1980 (на азербайджанском языке);
- Сарычев А. В., Шахматная композиция в Азербайджане, Баку, 1985 (на азербайджанском языке).
