= Azerbaijani Chess Championship =

National Chess championship in Azerbaijan

The Azerbaijani Chess Championship is usually held in Baku, Azerbaijan. It is organised by the Azerbaijan Chess Federation (ACF). The first championship was played in 1934, when Azerbaijan was a part of the Transcaucasian Socialist Federative Soviet Republic. Championships were held sporadically in the Azerbaijan Soviet Socialist Republic until 1945, when they became contested every year; this has continued today in independent Azerbaijan.

== Winners ==
Year	Open city	Open winner	Women's city	Women's winner
1992	Baku	Raouf Gadjily		
1993	Baku	Rahim Gasimov		
1994	Baku	Raouf Gadjily		
1995	Baku	Azer Mirzoev		
1996	Baku	Sarhan Guliev		
1997	Baku	Aidyn Guseinov		
1998	Baku	Rufat Bagirov		
1999	Baku	Magomed Zulfugarli		
2000	Baku	Azer Mirzoev		
2001	Baku	Shakhriyar Mamedyarov	Baku	Zeinab Mamedyarova
2002	Baku	Shakhriyar Mamedyarov	Baku	Firuza Velikhanli
2003	Baku	Rauf Mamedov	Baku	Turkan Mamedyarova
2004	Baku	Rauf Mamedov	Baku	Afag Khudaverdiyeva
2005				
2006	Baku	Rauf Mamedov	Baku	Khayala Isgandarova
2007	Baku	Elmir Guseinov	Baku	Zeinab Mamedyarova
2008	Baku	Rauf Mamedov	Baku	Zeinab Mamedyarova
2009	Baku	Rashad Babaev	Baku	Narmin Kazimova
2010	Baku	Eltaj Safarli	Baku	Turkan Mamedyarova
2011	Baku	Nidjat Mamedov	Baku	Turkan Mamedyarova
2012	Baku	Vugar Rasulov	Baku	Turkan Mamedyarova
2013	Baku	Zaur Mammadov	Baku	Khayala Abdulla
2014	Baku	Ulvi Bajarani	Baku	Aytan Amrayeva
2015	Baku	Rauf Mamedov	Baku	Zeinab Mamedyarova
2016	Baku	Eltaj Safarli	Baku	Narmin Kazimova
2017	Baku	Nijat Abasov	Baku	Gunay Mammadzada
2018	Baku	Abdulla Gadimbayli	Baku	Khanim Balajayeva
2019	Baku	Mahammad Muradli	Baku	Gunay Mammadzada
2020			Baku	Khanim Balajayeva
2021	Nakhchivan	Vasif Durarbayli	Nakhchivan	Gulnar Mammadova
2022	Nakhchivan	Mahammad Muradli	Baku	Govhar Beydullayeva
2023	Baku	Vasif Durarbayli	Baku	Govhar Beydullayeva
2024	Baku	Aydin Suleymanli	Baku	Ayan Allahverdiyeva
2025	Baku	Rauf Mamedov	Baku	Gunay Mammadzada
2026	Baku	Mahammad Muradli	Baku	Ulviyya Fataliyeva
