= Seyed Khalil Mousavi =

Iranian chess grandmaster (born 1998)

Personal information
- Born: April 20, 1998 (age 28) Lahijan, Iran

Chess career
- Country: Iran
- Title: Grandmaster (2022)
- FIDE rating: 2484 (July 2026)
- Peak rating: 2540 (October 2022)

Seyed Khalil Mousavi is an Iranian chess grandmaster.

== Chess career ==
In October 2021, he tied for second place with Vitaliy Bernadskiy, Srinath Narayanan, Mitrabha Guha, Shyam Sundar M., and Vugar Rasulov in the Sheikh Russel International GM tournament. He was ranked in 6th after tiebreaks and earned his second GM norm.

In June 2022, he tied for first place with Bardiya Daneshvar in the Iranian Chess Championship, but was ranked in second place after tiebreak scores.

He was awarded the Grandmaster title in 2022, after achieving his norms at the:

- Khazar University Chess Academi GM Norm Zirve Cup in May 2019
- Sheikh Russel International Grandmaster Chess Cup in October 2021
- Second Sunday Nakhchivan tournament in May 2022
