= Rufat Bagirov =

Azerbaijani chess grandmaster (born 1979)

Personal information
- Born: October 10, 1979 (age 46)

Chess career
- Country: Azerbaijan
- Title: Grandmaster (2002)
- FIDE rating: 2429 (July 2026)
- Peak rating: 2541 (July 2002)

Rufat Bagirov (born October 10, 1979) is an Azerbaijani chess grandmaster.

== Career ==
He was the Chess Champion of Azerbaijan in 1998 and Sub Champion of Azerbaijan in 2011. He got International Master (IM) title in 1998 and Grandmaster (GM) title in 2002. He was a member of the Azerbaijan Chess Olympiad team in 2000.

The Vladimir Open, a multi-round chess tournament that drew 89 competitors in the 2010 edition. Bagirov concluded the competition with 3.5 points, including a drawn game against Ukrainian player Andrei Kislinsky. The event was won by Vladislav Nozdrachov, who achieved 4.5 points.

He was awarded the title FIDE Trainer (2014).

== Notable tournaments ==
Tournament Name	Year	ELO	Points
ch-AZE(Baku AZE)	2011	2471	7.0
Moscow(Moscow)	2003	2494	7.0
Baku Bestcomp Cup active(Baku)	2000	2481	8.0
AZE-ch(Baku)	2000	2481	6.0
AZE-ch(Baku)	1998	NA	7.0
EU-ch U14(Szombathely)	1993	NA	7.0
