= Mahammad Muradli =

Azerbaijani chess grandmaster (born 2003)

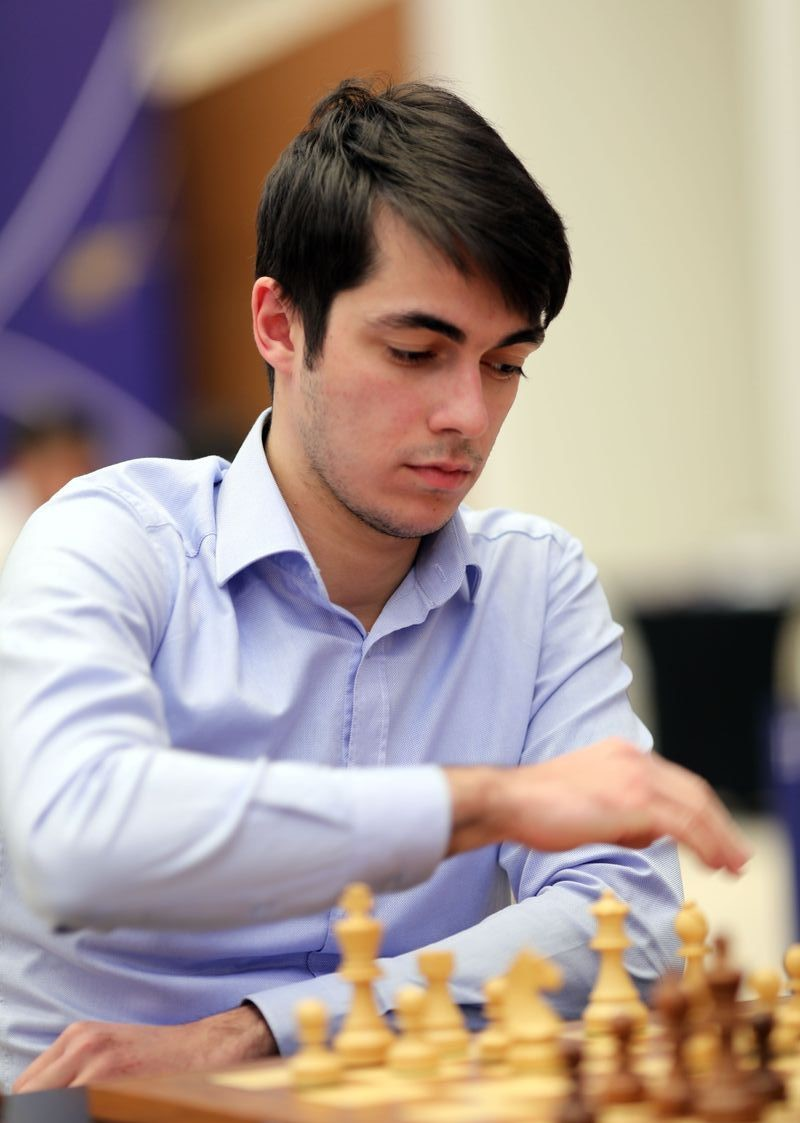
- Muradli in 2023

Personal information
- Born: August 1, 2003 (age 23) Baku, Azerbaijan

Chess career
- Country: Azerbaijan
- Title: Grandmaster (2022)
- FIDE rating: 2653 (September 2026)
- Peak rating: 2662 (October 2026)
- Ranking: No. 64 (September 2026)
- Peak ranking: No. 53 (October 2026)

Mahammad Muradli (Azerbaijani: Məhəmməd Muradlı; born 1 August 2003) is an Azerbaijani chess grandmaster (GM) and a three-time national champion.

== Career ==
Mahammad Muradli won the U12 section in the 2015 World Youth Chess Championship.

He played for Azerbaijan-3 team in the Chess Olympiad:

- In 2016, at the third board in the 42nd Chess Olympiad in Baku (+2, =0, -3).

In 2019, Muradli played for the Azerbaijan team in the World Youth Chess Olympiad and the team became an Olympic champion.

In 2019, 2022 and 2026, Muradli won Azerbaijani championship.

In July 2022, Muradli won the 2022 Biel MTO edition with a score of 7.0/9 and a rating performance of 2726.

In October 2023, at the world blitz chess championship among boys and girls under the age of 20, held on the island of Sardinia, Italy, Mahammad Muradli scored 9.5 points from 11 games and was awarded the gold medal ahead of all his opponents and won the title of world champion.
