= Faiq Hasanov =

Azerbaijani chess player (born 1940)

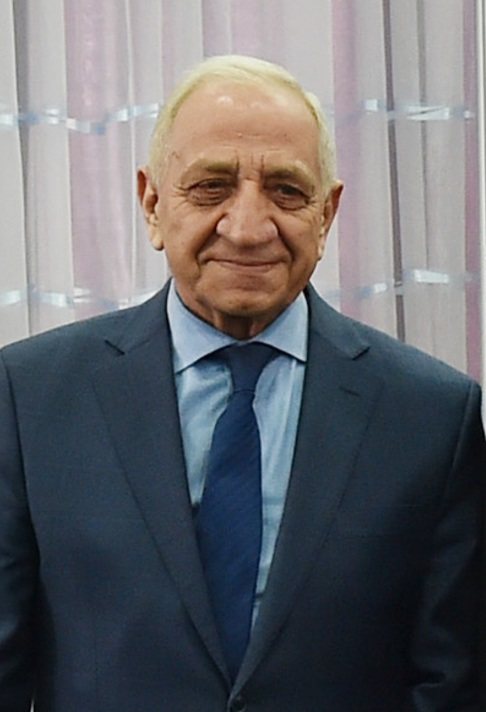

Personal information
- Born: Faiq Zülfüqar oğlu Həsənov; April 13, 1940 (age 86) Ganja, Azerbaijan SSR, USSR

Chess career
- Country: Azerbaijan

Faiq Hasanov (transliterated as Gasanov; Azerbaijani: Faiq Həsənov; born April 13, 1940, in Kirovobad, Azerbaijan SSR, USSR) is an Azerbaijani chess International Arbiter (1980), coach, television presenter, author and vice-president of Azerbaijan Chess Federation.

== Chess arbiter ==
The first international tournament that Hasanov refereed took place in Baku in 1964. He also refereed sports contest between the USSR nations.

Hasanov was awarded the title of International Arbiter by FIDE in 1980. He has been in charge of World and European Championships, Olympiads, World Team Chess Championship. He also has been refereeing the tournament in Linaress for twenty years and was the chief arbiter of the first FIDE Grand Prix tournament in Baku. He was a member of the reconstituted Appeal Committee during the World Chess Championship 2006.

== Author and presenter ==
Hasanov is widely known as television presenter of weekly Şahmat klubu (Chess Club) programme, which is broadcasting each Sunday in AzTV. He has presenting this programme for 40 years without any major interruptions as programme considered to be one of the longest programmes in the history of AzTV channel.

== Awards and titles ==
He was awarded with Shohrat Order (Order of Glory) for his role in the development of chess in Azerbaijan. Since 2006, he holds the position of vice-president of Azerbaijani Chess Federation.
