= Josefine Safarli =

German chess player (born 1998)

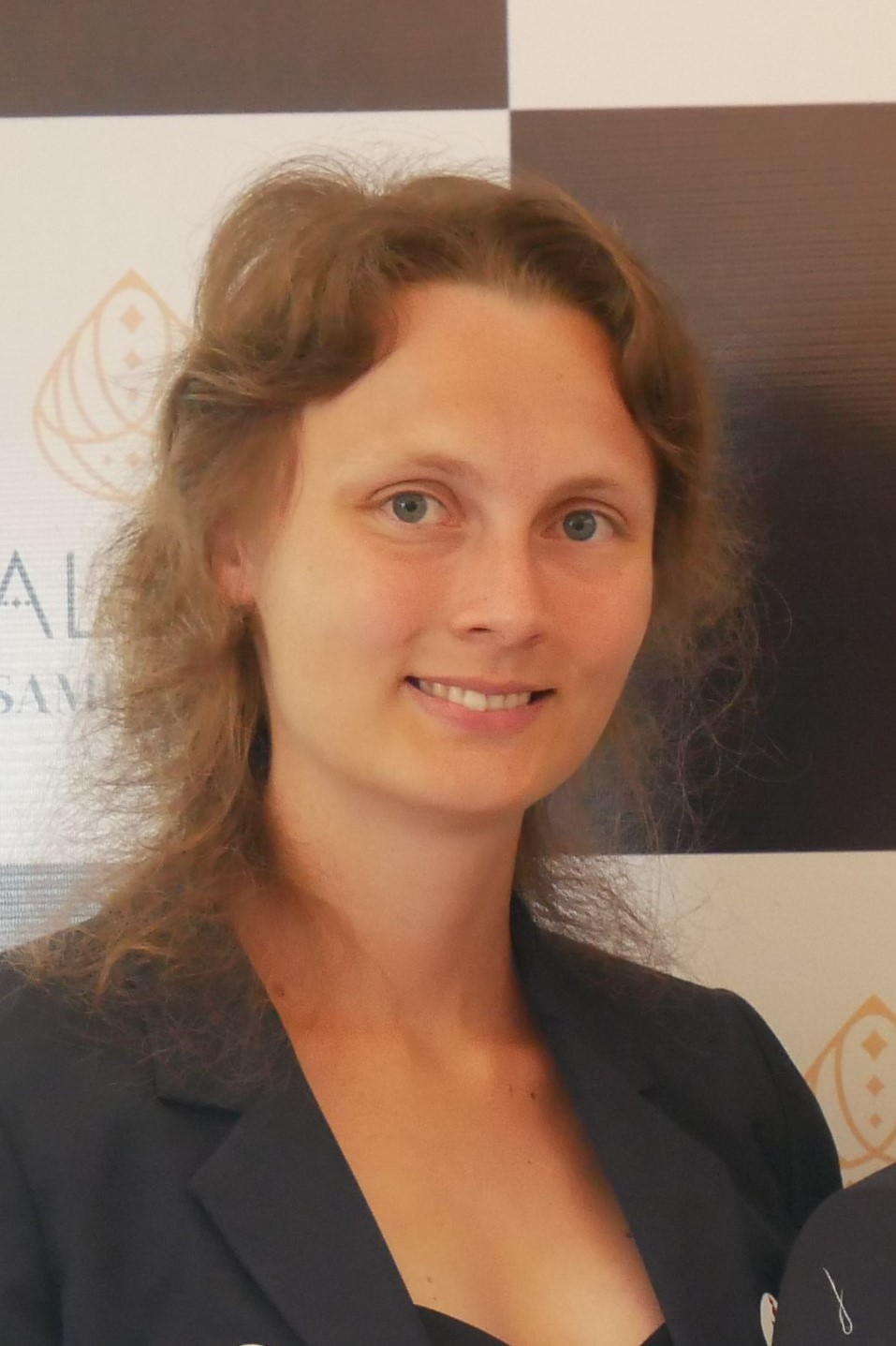
- Josefine Safarli in 2022

Personal information
- Born: 7 January 1998 (age 28) Gardelegen, Saxony-Anhalt, Germany
- Spouse: Eltaj Safarli (m. 2024)

Chess career
- Country: Germany
- Title: Woman Grandmaster (2018)
- Peak rating: 2369 (December 2021)

Josefine Safarli (née Heinemann, born 7 January 1998) is a German chess player who holds the title of Woman Grandmaster.

== Biography ==
Josefine Heinemann first participation in a German Chess Championship is the U10 championship in 2007 in Willingen. In 2015 she won German Youth Chess Championship in Girls U18 age group. In the same year she ranked in 5th place in World Youth Chess Championship in Girls U18 age group. In 2016 she ranked in 10th place in this tournament.

In 2018 in Dresden Josefine Heinemann ranked 3rd in German Masters for women.

Josefine Safarli played for Germany in the Women's Chess Olympiad:

- In 2022, at second board in the 44th Chess Olympiad (women) in Chennai (+2, =6, -1),
- In 2024, at third board in the 45th Chess Olympiad (women) in Budapest (+4, =3, -2).

Josefine Safarli played for Germany in the European Women's Team Chess Championships:

- In 2015, at reserve board in the 11th European Team Chess Championship (women) in Reykjavík (+4, =0, -3),
- In 2017, at second board in the 12th European Team Chess Championship (women) in Crete (+1, =1, -4),
- In 2021, at second board in the 14th European Team Chess Championship (women) in Čatež ob Savi (+4, =4, -1),
- In 2023, at third board in the 15th European Team Chess Championship (women) in Budva (+4, =4, -0),
- In 2025, at third board in the 16th European Team Chess Championship (women) in Batumi (+2, =5, -1) and won team bronze medal.

Josefine Safarli played for Germany in the Women's Chess Mitropa Cups:

- In 2016, at reserve board in the 13th Chess Mitropa Cup (women) in Prague (+2, =3, -1) and won team gold medal,
- In 2017, at second board in the 14th Chess Mitropa Cup (women) in Balatonszárszó (+4, =1, -4).

In 2016, she was awarded the FIDE Woman International Master (WIM) title and received the FIDE Woman Grandmaster (WGM) title two years later.

== Personal life ==
Heinemann studied business mathematics at the University of Mannheim and received a scholarship due to her sporting success. In 2024 she married the Azerbaijani grandmaster Eltaj Safarli.
