= Djakhangir Agaragimov =

Azerbaijani chess grandmaster (born 1986)

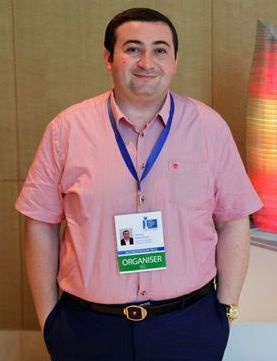
- Djakhangir Agaragimov, 2015

Personal information
- Born: December 15, 1986 (age 39)

Chess career
- Country: Azerbaijan
- Title: Grandmaster (2014)
- FIDE rating: 2502 (July 2026)
- Peak rating: 2502 (February 2014)

Djakhangir Agaragimov (born December 15, 1986), in Azerbaijani Cahangir Ağarəhimov, is an Azerbaijani chess grandmaster.

Agaragimov visited secondary school #258 in Baku and studied at the Azerbaijan State University of Economics. He trains chess together with Eltaj Safarli.

He holds the Grandmaster title since February 2014, fulfilling norms at the Baku Open in August 2010, where he won against the Grandmasters Natalia Zhukova and Davit Jojua among others, and at a double-round rating tournament in Alushta in June 2013. He is one of the few chess players who became Grandmaster without holding the title International Master before.

As a chess player, he is inactive. His last tournament was a tournament in Rustavi in January 2014.

He was Operating Director at the Chess World Cup 2015 in Baku.

== Publications ==
- Pearls of Azerbaijan, by Vladimir Bagirov (chief editor), Niepołomice, Chess Evolution, 2016, ISBN 978-83-944290-8-9.
