= Omar Almeida Quintana =

Cuban chess grandmaster (born 1981)

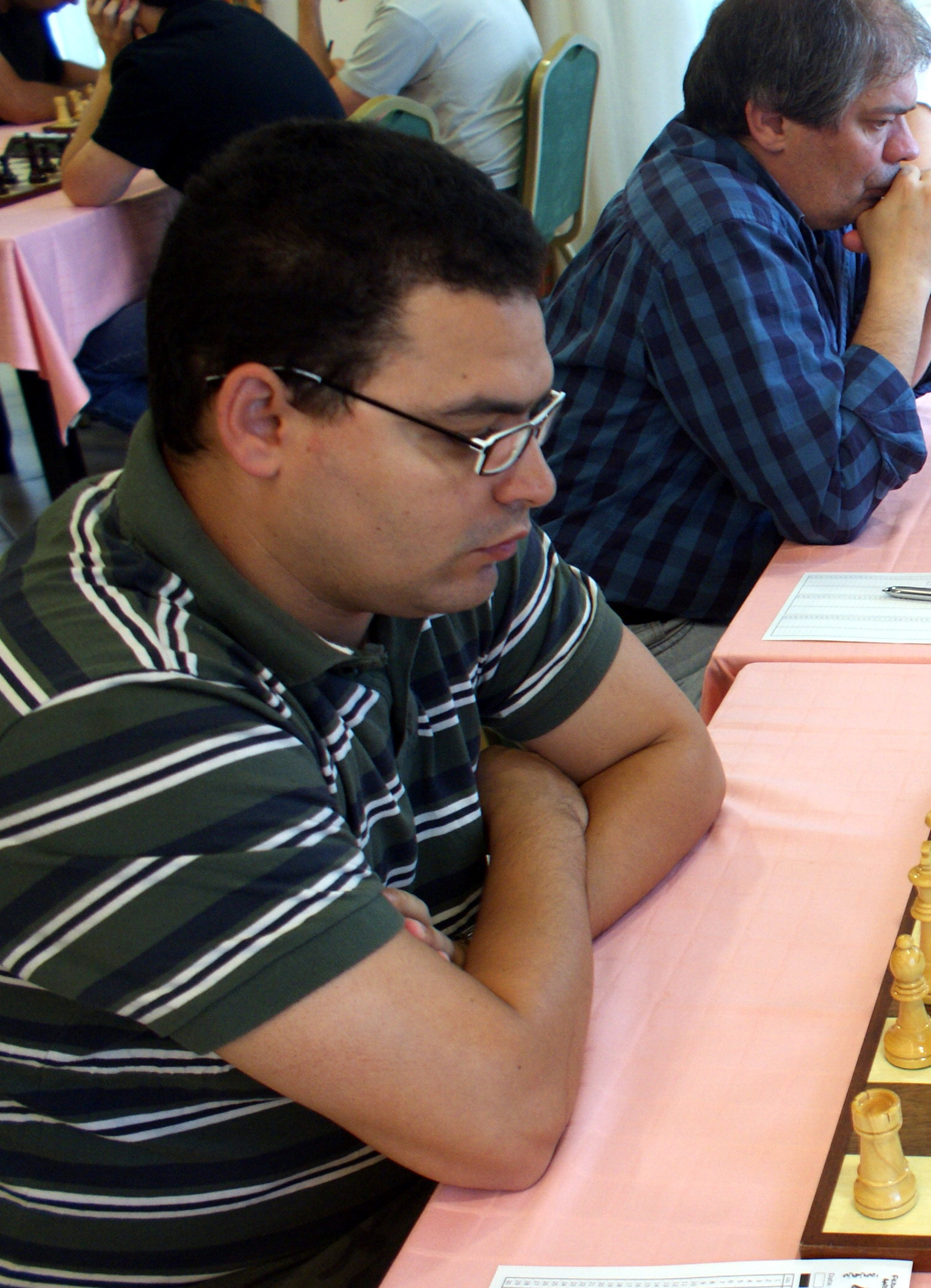

Personal information
- Born: October 28, 1981 (age 44)

Chess career
- Country: Cuba
- Title: Grandmaster (2006)
- FIDE rating: 2454 (July 2026)
- Peak rating: 2593 (November 2010)

Omar Almeida Quintana (born October 28, 1981) is a Cuban chess Grandmaster. Almeida Quintana became a Grandmaster in 2006 and his current FIDE rating is 2523. His highest achieved FIDE rating in the database is 2593. He is the 6th best chess player in Cuba as of May 2020.

In 2010 he tied for 1st with Azer Mirzoev at the XVIII Torneo Internacional in Albacete.
