= Aidyn Guseinov =

Azerbaijani chess grandmaster (1957–2003)

Personal information
- Born: Aydın Qurban oğlu Hüseynov; 31 August 1957 Batumi, Georgian SSR, Soviet Union
- Died: 30 October 2003 (aged 46) Baku, Azerbaijan

Chess career
- Country: Soviet Union; Azerbaijan
- Title: Grandmaster (1998)
- Peak rating: 2513 (January 1999)

Aidyn Guseinov (Azerbaijani: Aydın Hüseynov) (31 August 1957 – 30 October 2003) was an Azerbaijani chess grandmaster. He became a FIDE International Master in 1996 and a Grandmaster in 1998.

== Biography ==
He started attending chess classes in the «Burevestnik» club, particularly because he was part of GM Vladimir Bagirov group. Besides that for several month, he was attending group lessons of GM Vladimir Makogonov. Besides that period, over the whole of his career, Aidyn Guseinov never had a chess coach. Master of Sports from 1978, International Master from 1995, International Grandmaster from 1998 (3rd GM in the history of Azerbaijan). In 1991-1996 worked as a coach for Qatar Chess Federation. He died on 30 October 2003 at the age of 46 in Baku.

=== Family ===
His wife, Elmira Aliyeva, is a 13 times Azerbaijan National Chess champion, International Master and the first Azerbaijani woman to reach the title of Master of Sports. His son Elmir Guseinov holds the title of International Master is a several times Azerbaijan Junior Champion and the 2007 Azerbaijan Chess Champion.

== Results ==
Aidyn Guseynov played very successfully in the Caucasus Championships (Azerbaijan, Armenia, Georgia) and in the All-Union Championships:

- 1982– Caucasus Championship (Gandja), 1st place
- 1984– Caucasus Championship (Tbilisi), 3rd place
- 1983– «Urojay» All-union Championship, 1st place
- 1987– USSR Championship (Tyumen), 2nd place
- 1988– USSR Championship (Uzhgorod), 2nd place
- 1990– USSR Championship (Herson), 2nd place
- 1996– Azerbaijan Championship, (Baku), 1st place

International tournaments:

- 1983: International tournament (Baku), 2nd place (behind Nigel Short)
- 1984: International tournament (Czech Republic), 1st place
- 1988: International tournament (Poland), 1st place
- 1994: International tournament (Uzbekistan), 2nd place
- 1997: International tournament (Azerbaijan, Zagulba), 1-2 place
- 1998: International tournament (Turkey, Ankara), 1-2 place
- 1999: International tournament (Greece, Athens), 2-4 place

Aidyn Guseynov has successfully represented Azerbaijan in team tournaments for almost 30 years:

- 1974 – USSR Spartakiada (among schools), 1st place on 1st board (5.5 out 7) with Garry Kasparov on the 2nd board, team took 2nd place overall.
- 1990 – USSR Spartakiada, 1st place on 2nd board (8 out of 9)

Aidyn Guseynov also played for Azerbaijan on USSR Spartakiadas in 1979 and 1983, as well as played in the 1998 33rd Chess Olympiad in Elista and 1997 European Chess Championship in Pula, Croatia (6 out of 9 on the 1st board).
