= Rashad Babaev =

Azerbaijani chess grandmaster and trainer (born 1981)

Personal information
- Born: September 3, 1981 (age 44) Baku, Azerbaijan

Chess career
- Country: Azerbaijan
- Title: Grandmaster (2007)
- FIDE rating: 2525 (July 2026)
- Peak rating: 2535 (April 2009)

Rashad Babaev (Azerbaijani: Raşad Babayev; born September 3, 1981, Baku, Azerbaijan) is an Azerbaijani FIDE grandmaster and trainer as of 2019. He is a full-time chess coach/arbiter. He became a Grandmaster (GM) in 2007.
