= Sarhan Guliev =

Azerbaijani chess grandmaster

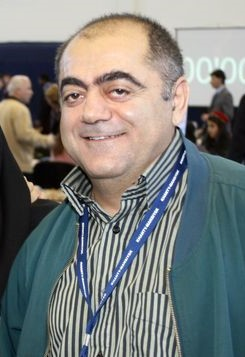

Personal information
- Born: April 1, 1968 (age 58) Aşağı Mollu, Qubadli District, Azerbaijan SSR, USSR

Chess career
- Country: Azerbaijan
- Title: Grandmaster (2005)
- Peak rating: 2537 (July 2003)

Sarhan Guliev (Azerbaijani: Sərxan Quliyev; born 1 April 1968) is an Azerbaijani chess player who holds the title of Grandmaster (GM). He earned the International Master (IM) title in 1993 and the Grandmaster title in 1995. He was a member of the Azerbaijan Chess Olympiad team in 1994 and 1998.
