= Khayala Abdulla =

Azerbaijani chess player (born 1993)

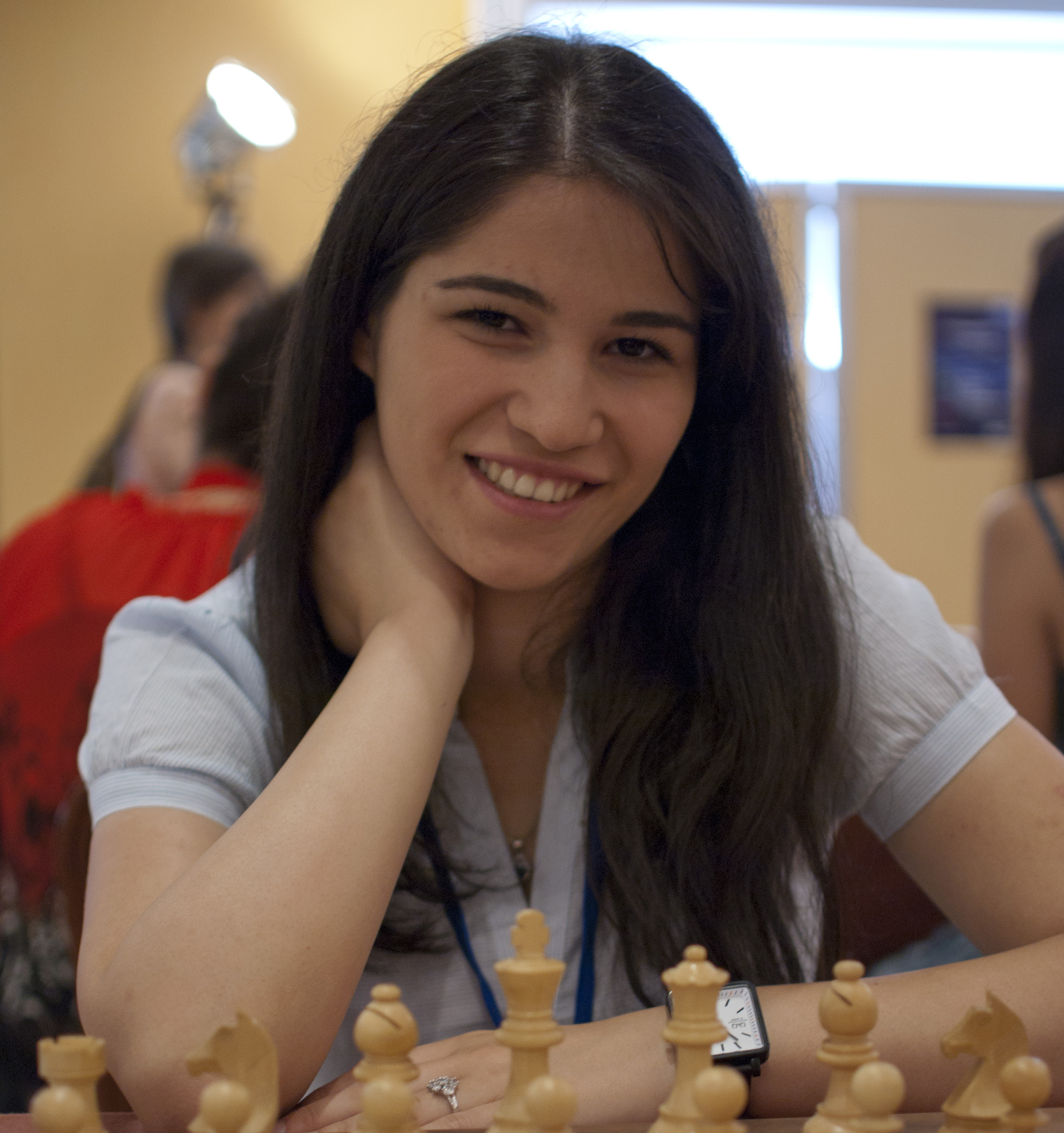
- Abdulla in 2012

Personal information
- Born: Khayala Mardan qizi Abdulla; 13 July 1993 (age 32)

Chess career
- Country: Azerbaijan
- Title: Woman Grandmaster (2015)
- Peak rating: 2320 (September 2015)

Khayala Abdulla (Azerbaijani: Xəyalə Abdulla; born 13 July 1993) is an Azerbaijani chess player who holds the title of Woman Grandmaster (WGM, 2015).

== Chess career ==
In 2010, Khayala Abdulla won a bronze medal in the European Youth Chess Championship in Batumi, in the age category U18. In 2011, she won the Azerbaijani Youth Chess Championship in the age category U18, and second place in the age category U20. In 2012, Abdulla repeatedly won the silver medal in the Azerbaijani Youth Chess Championship in age category U20.

Twice winner of the Azerbaijani Women's Chess Championships (2013, 2014).

Abdulla played for Azerbaijan in the Women's Chess Olympiads:

- In 2014, at third board in the 41st Chess Olympiad (women) in Tromsø (+3, =3, -2),
- In 2016, at second board (Azerbaijan 2) in the 42nd Chess Olympiad (women) in Baku (+1, =0, -4).

Abdulla played for Azerbaijan in the European Team Chess Championship:

- In 2013, at third board in the 10th European Team Chess Championship (women) in Warsaw (+2, =2, -2),
- In 2015, at fourth board in the 11th European Team Chess Championship (women) in Reykjavík (+1, =3, -2).

In 2010, she was awarded the FIDE Woman International Master (WIM) title, and in 2015, the Woman Grandmaster (WGM) title.
