= Hugo ten Hertog =

Dutch chess grandmaster (born 1994)

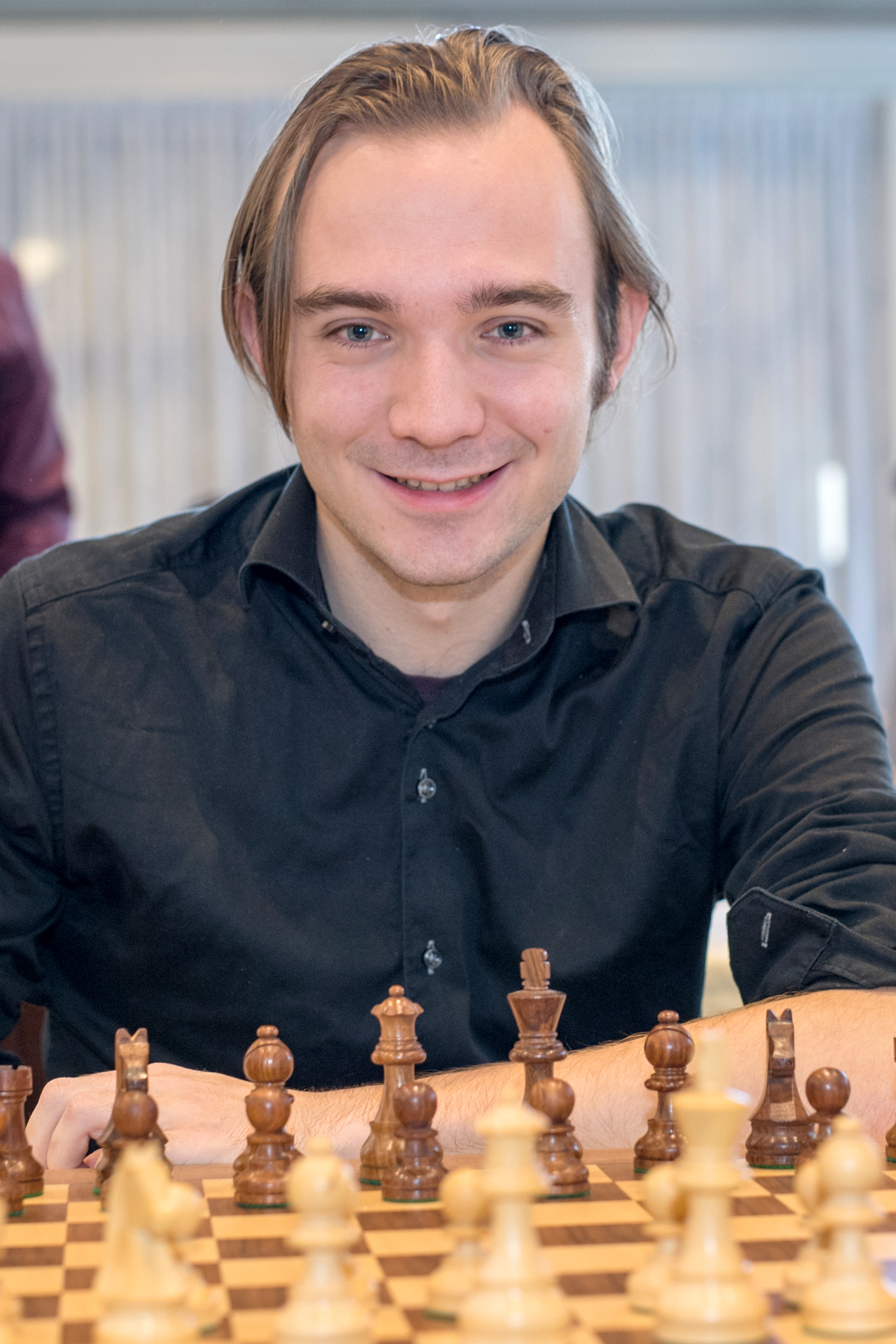
- ten Hertog in 2016

Personal information
- Born: July 6, 1994 (age 32) Utrecht, Netherlands

Chess career
- Country: Netherlands
- Title: Grandmaster (2020)
- FIDE rating: 2518 (July 2026)
- Peak rating: 2532 (October 2025)

Hugo ten Hertog is a Dutch chess grandmaster.

== Chess career ==
In February 2012, he was in third place after the fourth round of the Batavia Tournament. He held a draw against top seed grandmaster Sipke Ernst, who was rated over 200 points higher.

In February 2020, he earned his final GM norm at the Lisbon Open, where he tied for second place.

In October 2021, he participated in the Dutch Chess Championship, where he was eliminated in the second round by Erik van den Doel.
