= Aynur Sofiyeva =

Azerbaijani chess player (born 1970)

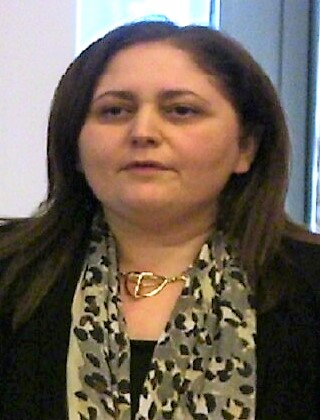
- Sofiyeva in 2015

Personal information
- Born: 19 July 1970 (age 55) Qakh, Azerbaijan SSR, Soviet Union

Chess career
- Country: Azerbaijan; Soviet Union
- Title: Woman Grandmaster (1991)
- FIDE rating: 2313 (June 2022)
- Peak rating: 2420 (July 1991)
- Peak ranking: No. 12 (July 1991)

Aynur Mammadiyya qizi Sofiyeva (Azerbaijani: Aynur Məmmədiyyə qızı Sofiyeva; born 19 July 1970) is an Azerbaijani politician and former chess player. She has been Deputy Chair of the State Committee for Family, Women and Children Affairs since 2007.

== Early life and education ==
Sofiyeva was born on 19 July 1970 in Qakh District. She graduated from Baku State University with a degree in journalism in 1991 and a degree in law in 2001.

== Chess player ==
Sofiyeva has played chess since 1974. She was district champion at age 6 and national and Soviet Union champion at 15. She won a gold medal al at the World Championships in 1990. She was the first international grandmaster in Azerbaijan and in the Islamic world. From 2002 until 2007 she served as President of the Azerbaijan Chess Federation.

== Career ==
Sofiyeva worked as a legal advisor at the Ministry of Labor and Social Protection of Population from 1998 until 2000. She was elected as a member of the National Assembly in 2000 for the New Azerbaijan Party representing the Sheki district, serving until 2005. She was a member of the Parliamentary Assembly of the Council of Europe from 2004 until 2006.

In March 2007, she was appointed Deputy Chair of the State Committee on Family, Women, and Children's Affairs, working to promote gender equality. In 2011, she proposed increasing the marriage age for Azerbaijani girls.

== Personal life ==
Sofiyeva is married to footballer and former national coach Yunis Hüseynov and they have two children.
