= Zağulba Bağları =

Beach in Azerbaijan

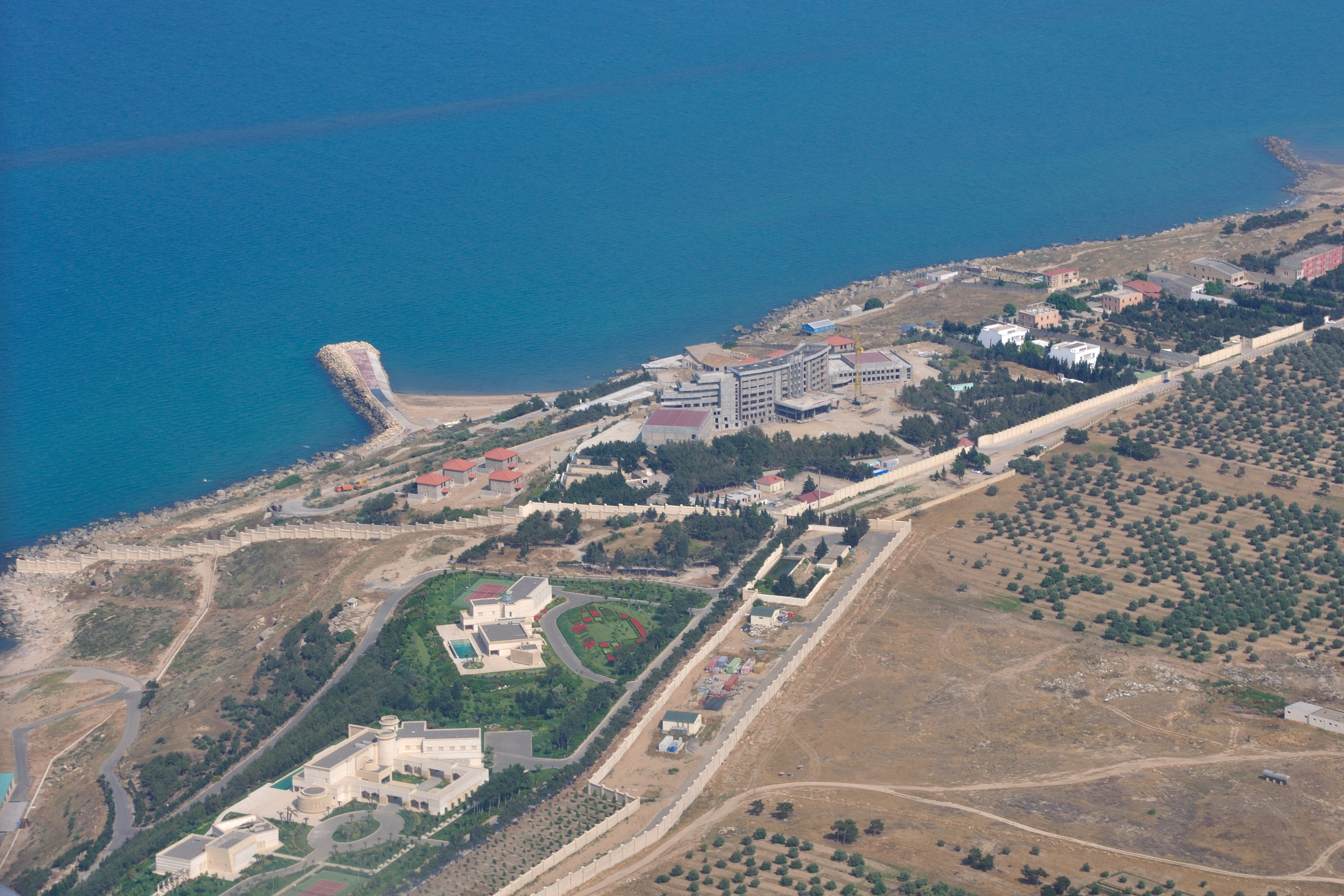

- Location within Azerbaijan
- Coordinates: 40°33′05″N 50°05′05″E
- Country: Azerbaijan
- City: Baku
- Time zone: UTC+4 (AZT)
  - Summer (DST): UTC+5 (AZT)

Zağulba Bağları (also, Bağlar, Buzovnyneft’, Dacha Zagul’ba, Zagul’ba, and Zyugyul’ba) is a resort in Baku, Azerbaijan, and one of the main beaches. The city also hosts a disco club of the same name.

== Tourism ==
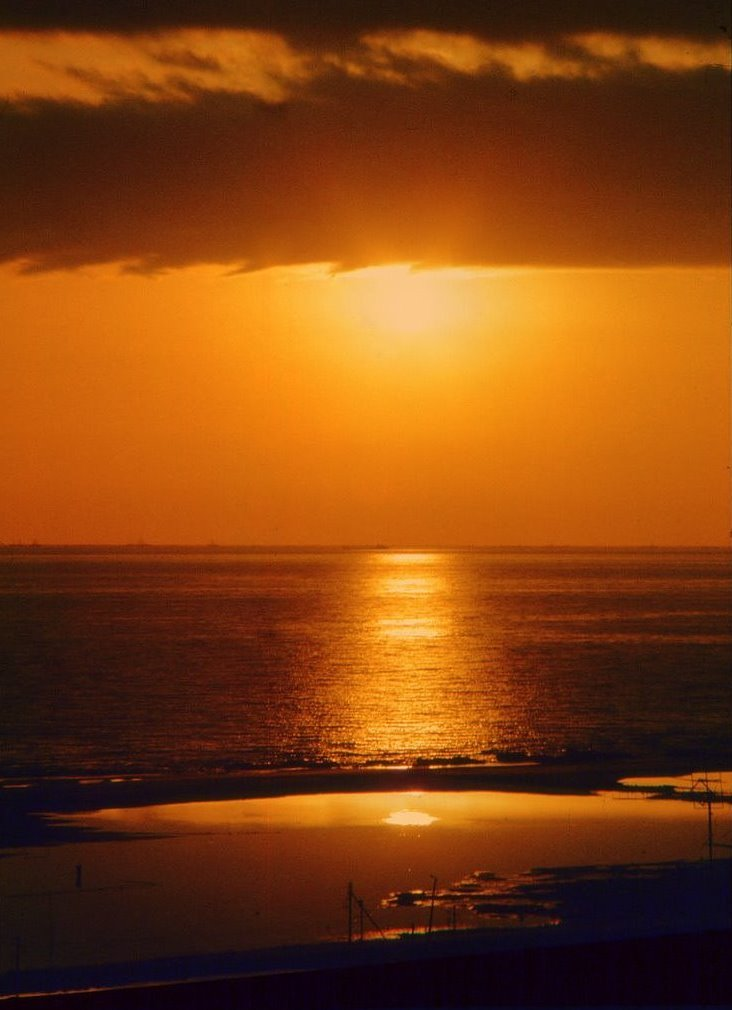
Zaqulba Beach view from Ganclik Hotel

For decades, Zagulba has attracted the Baku intelligentsia. It resembles the Riviera and Monaco for locals with interesting land and sea views.
