= Vugar Asadli =

Azerbaijani chess grandmaster (born 2001)

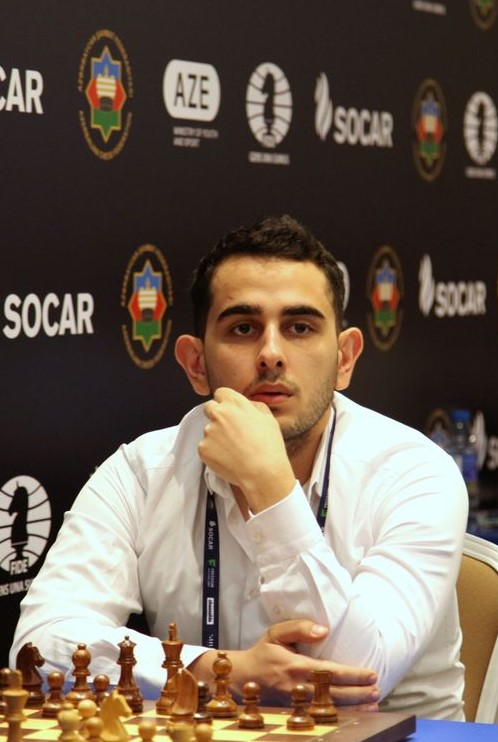
- Asadli in 2023

Personal information
- Born: 9 October 2001 (age 24) Baku, Azerbaijan

Chess career
- Country: Azerbaijan
- Title: Grandmaster (2019)
- FIDE rating: 2545 (July 2026)
- Peak rating: 2586 (February 2023)

Vugar Asadli (Azerbaijani: Vüqar Əsədli, born 9 October 2001) is an Azerbaijani chess player who was awarded the title of chess grandmaster in 2019. Asadli is ranked as the 9th best chess player in Azerbaijan in the rating list of September 2020.

He scored 6/8 on the 3rd board at the 2016 World Youth Chess Olympiad, while in the 2020 Portugal open rapid, he scored 6.5/8, placing him in the 9th place. In the 2020 Portugal open, he scored 7/9, placing him in the 2- 9th place along with Hugo Ten Hertog, Evgeny Alekseev, Eduardo Iturrizaga, Aleksandar Indjic, Aryan Tari, Alexander Motylev, and Tigran Ghamarian. In the Baku Open 2019, he ranked 3rd with a score of 7.5/9.

He will be playing in the world rapid and blitz championship 2023 held in Samarkand, Uzbekistan.

Asadli received an international master title from FIDE in 2017, a FIDE master title in 2015, and a Candidate master title in 2014.
