= Misratdin Iskandarov =

Azerbaijani chess grandmaster (born 1995)

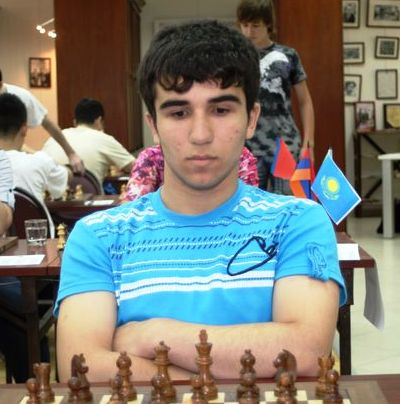
- Iskandarov in 2011

Personal information
- Born: January 14, 1995 (age 31) Sumgait, Azerbaijan
- Spouse: Narmin Kazimova

Chess career
- Country: Azerbaijan
- Title: Grandmaster (2020)
- FIDE rating: 2520 (September 2026)
- Peak rating: 2601 (May 2022)

Misratdin Iskandarov is an Azerbaijani chess grandmaster.

== Chess career ==
In December 2021, Iskandarov won the International Bicapawn Open by defeating Masoud Mosadeghpour in the final round.

In May 2022, he led the Sharjah Masters tournament after the third round.

In May 2023, he was defeated by Hans Niemann in the fourth round of the Dubai Open Chess Tournament.

Iskandarov competed in the Chess World Cup 2023, where he defeated the higher-seeded Bobby Cheng in the first round, but was defeated by Gukesh D in the second round.
