= Ilaha Kadimova =

Azerbaijani chess player

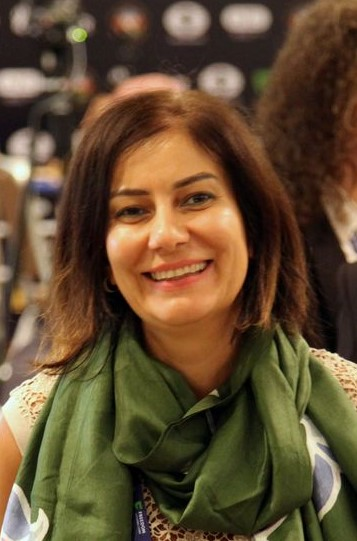
- Kadimova in 2023

Personal information
- Born: November 5, 1975 (age 50) Ganja, Soviet Union

Chess career
- Country: Azerbaijan
- Title: Woman Grandmaster (1994)
- FIDE rating: 2314 (March 2018)
- Peak rating: 2420 (January 1997)
- Peak ranking: No. 14 woman (July 1996)

Ilaha Kadimova (Azerbaijani: İlahə Akif qızı Qədimova; born November 5, 1975) is an Azerbaijani Woman Grandmaster chess player.

She won the World Youth Chess Championship (Girls) in 1992, 1993 and European Junior Chess Championship (Girls) in 1993.
