= Khayala Isgandarova =

Azerbaijani-Turkish chess player

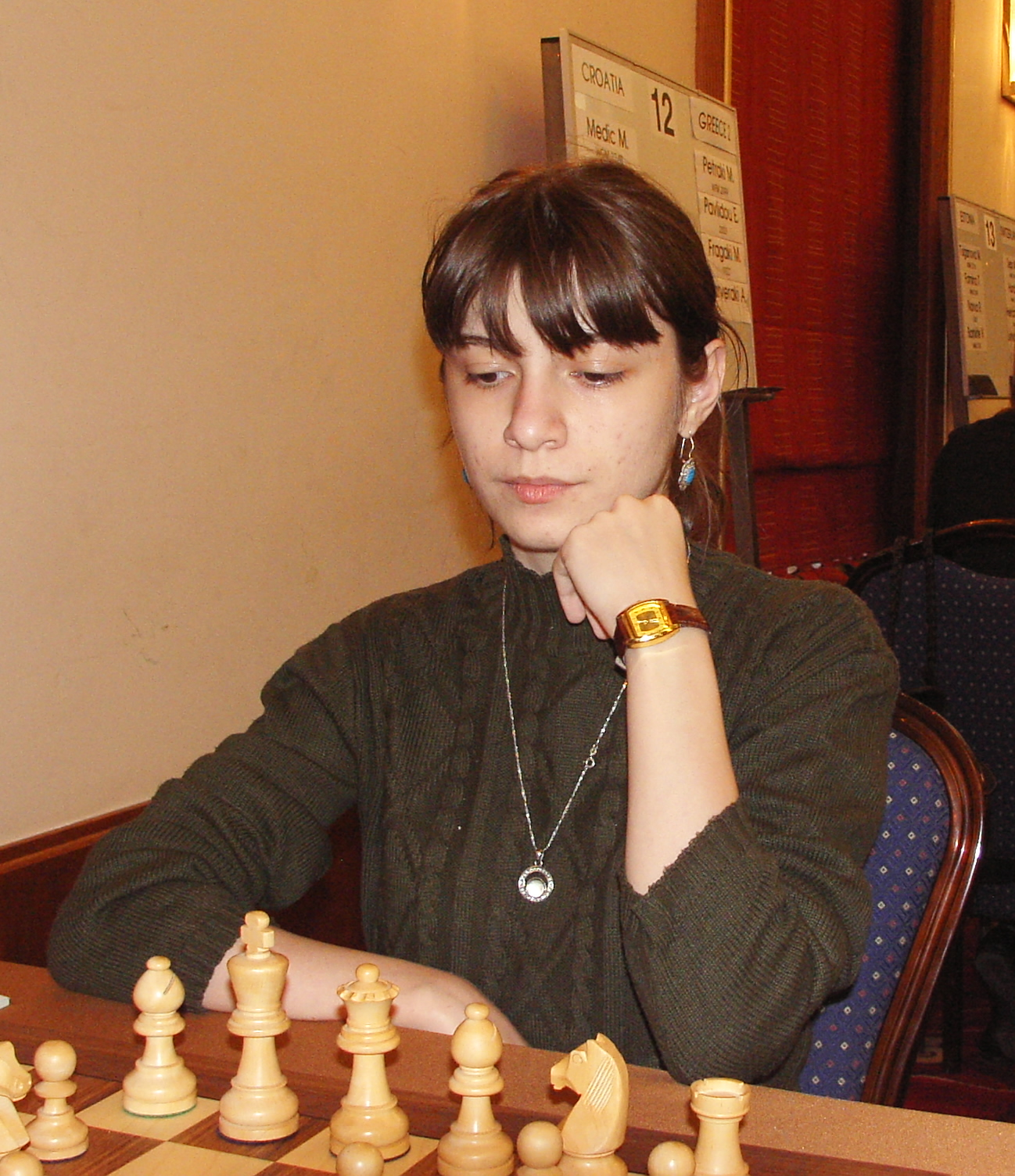
- Khayala Isgandarova in 2007

Personal information
- Born: 20 October 1988 (age 37) Baku, Azerbaijan SSR, Soviet Union

Chess career
- Country: Azerbaijan (until 2013); Turkey (since 2013)
- Title: Woman International Master (2009)
- Peak rating: 2257 (May 2017)

Khayala Isgandarova (Azerbaijani: Xəyalə İsgəndərova; born 20 October 1988) is an Azerbaijan born Turkish chess player who holds the title of Woman International Master (WIM, 2009).

== Chess career ==
In 2008, Khayala Isgandarova won the Azerbaijani Girls' chess championship in age category U20. Twice won bronze medals in the ⁣⁣Azerbaijani women's chess championships (2007, 2008). In the ⁣⁣Turkish women's chess championship won silver (2015) and two bronze (2014, 2016) medals. In 2015 in Sharjah Khayala Isgandarova won the international women's chess tournament Sharjah Cup.

Khayala Isgandarova played for Azerbaijan and Turkey in the Women's Chess Olympiads:

- In 2006, at first board in the 37th Chess Olympiad (women) in Turin (+2, =2, -7),
- In 2008, at the fourth board in the 38th Chess Olympiad (women) in Dresden (+3, =3, -2),
- In 2010, at reserve board in the 39th Chess Olympiad (women) in Khanty-Mansiysk (+1, =2, -1),
- In 2012, at reserve board in the 40th Chess Olympiad (women) in Istanbul (+2, =3, -1),
- In 2014, at the third board in the 41st Chess Olympiad (women) in Tromsø (+5, =2, -3),
- In 2016, at the fourth board in the 42nd Chess Olympiad (women) in Baku (+3, =3, -1).

Khayala Isgandarova played for Azerbaijan and Turkey in the European Team Chess Championship:

- In 2007, at reserve board in the 7th European Team Chess Championship (women) in Heraklion (+0, =2, -1),
- In 2009, at fourth board in the 8th European Team Chess Championship (women) in Novi Sad (+3, =2, -2),
- In 2015, at fourth board in the 11th European Team Chess Championship (women) in Reykjavík (+3, =1, -2).
