= Cemil Aghamaliyev =

Azerbaijani chess Grandmaster (born 1974)

Personal information
- Born: 31 August 1974 (age 51)

Chess career
- Country: Azerbaijan (until 2014); Turkey (since 2014)
- Title: Grandmaster (2002); FIDE Trainer (2017)
- FIDE rating: 2486 (July 2026)
- Peak rating: 2526 (October 2003)

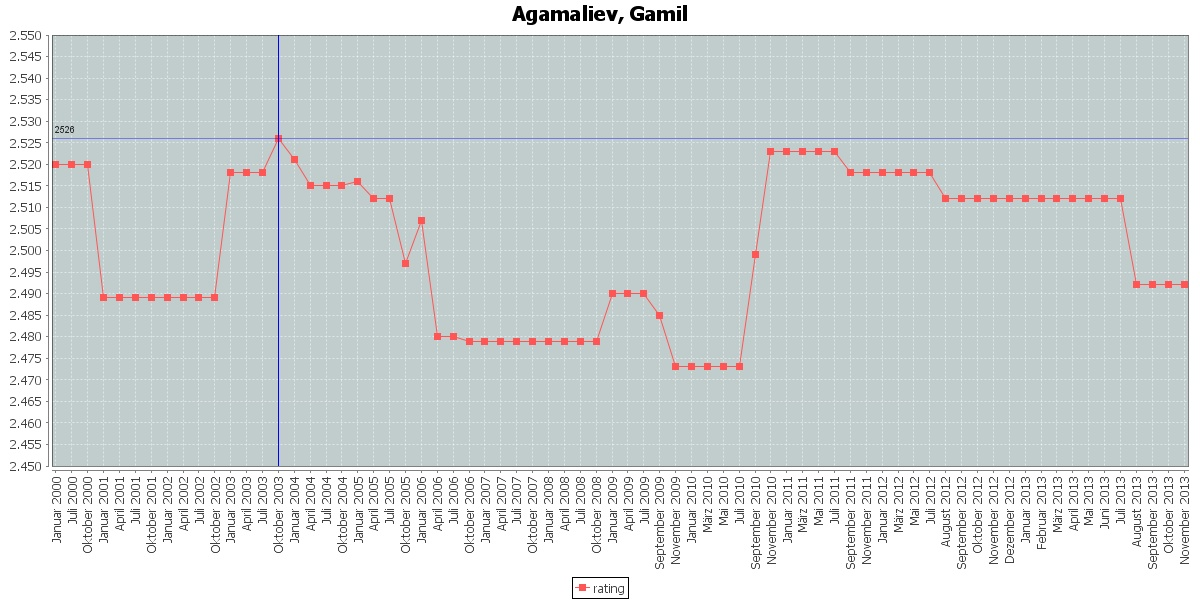
Development of Elo rating

Cemil Aghamaliyev (Azerbaijani: Cəmil Ağamalıyev), Turkish spelling Cemil Ağamaliyev, (born 31 August 1974) is an Azerbaijani chess Grandmaster, now resident of Turkey.

He played for Azerbaijan in the World Youth U26 Team Chess Championship of 1993. In 2005, he finished fifth in the 2nd Kish GM tournament in Iran.

In 2014, he transferred to Turkey, where he now spells his name as Cemil Aghamaliyev. His handle on the Internet Chess Club is "Sheki".
