= Nidjat Mamedov =

Azerbaijani chess grandmaster (born 1985)

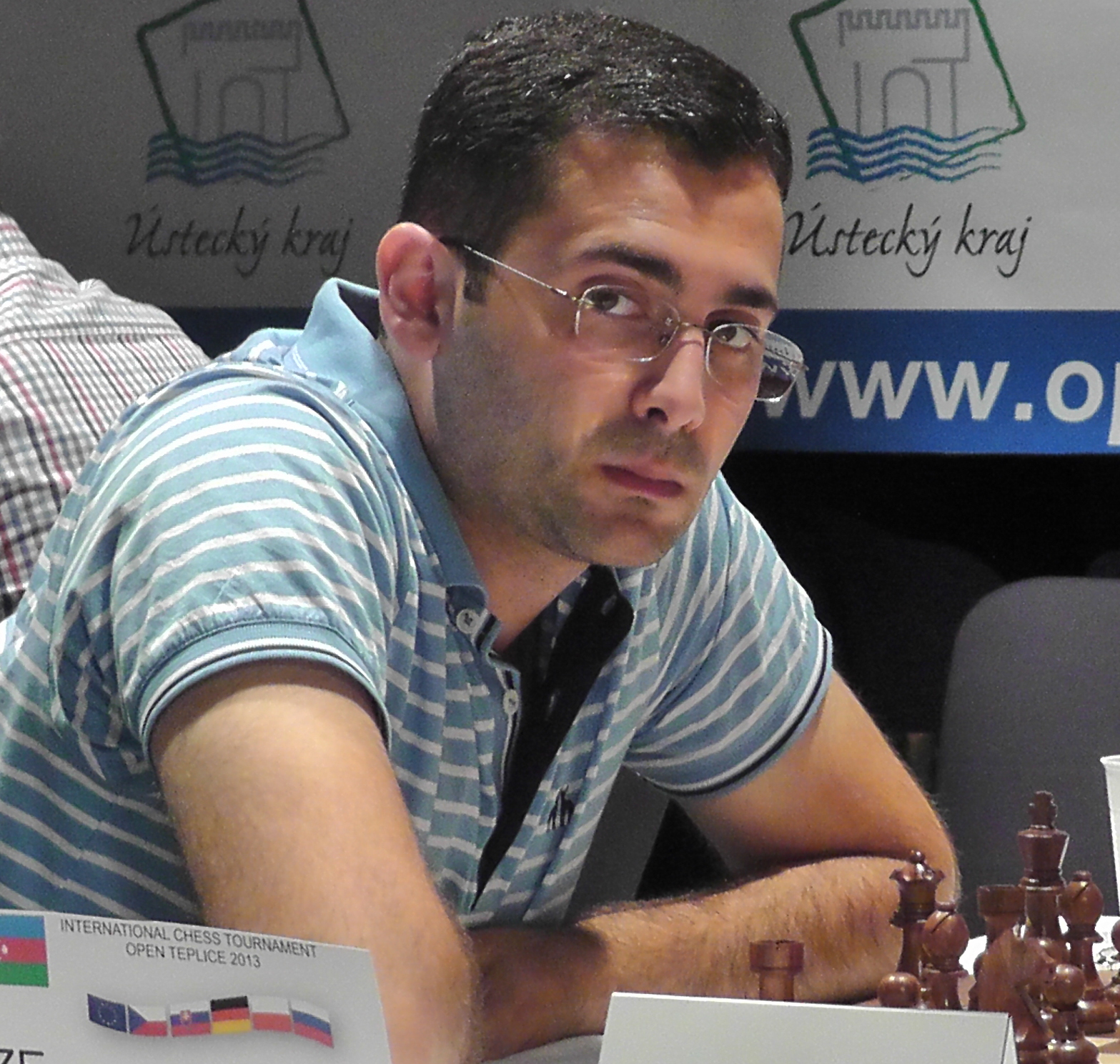
- Barcelona 2010

Personal information
- Born: April 2, 1985 (age 41) Nakhchivan, Azerbaijan SSR, Soviet Union

Chess career
- Country: Azerbaijan
- Title: Grandmaster (2006)
- FIDE rating: 2575 (October 2026)
- Peak rating: 2624 (January 2014)

Nidjat Mamedov (Azerbaijani: Nicat Məmmədov; born 2 April 1985) is an Azerbaijani chess player. He was awarded the title Grandmaster by FIDE in 2006.

== Career ==
He won the U14 section of European Youth Chess Championships in 1999. In 2007 Mamedov tied for first place with Mircea Pârligras in the 11th Open International Bavarian Championship in Bad Wiessee winning the tournament on tiebreak. He tied for first with Vadim Malakhatko and Valeriy Neverov in the 2007/08 Hastings International Chess Congress. In 2008 he tied for 4–8th with Tamaz Gelashvili, Anton Filippov, Constantin Lupulescu and Alexander Zubarev in the Romgaz Open tournament in Bucharest. In 2010 in Baku he got second place at the Azerbaijani Chess Championship. Mamedov won the Azerbaijani championship in 2011. In June 2013, he won the Teplice Open in Czech Republic. In 2018 Mamedov won the Nakhchivan Open, edging out Sergei Tiviakov on tiebreak score.

He played for Azerbaijan in the 2000 Chess Olympiad in Istanbul, Turkey and in the World Team Chess Championships of 2010 and 2013.
