= Zeinab Mamedyarova =

Azerbaijani chess player (born 1983)

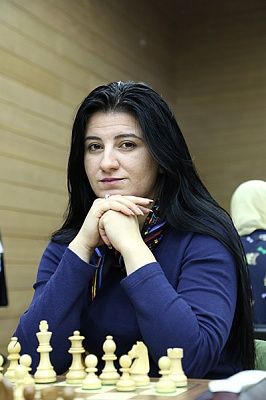
- Mamedyarova in 2017

Personal information
- Born: Zeynəb Həmid qızı Məmmədyarova; 3 October 1983 (age 42) Sumgayit, Azerbaijan SSR, Soviet Union

Chess career
- Country: Azerbaijan
- Title: Woman Grandmaster (2002)
- Peak rating: 2384 (July 2007)

Zeinab Hamid qizi Mamedyarova (also spelled Mamedjarova; Azerbaijani: Zeynəb Həmid qızı Məmmədyarova; born 3 October 1983) is an Azerbaijani chess player holding the FIDE title of Woman Grandmaster (WGM).

== Career ==
In 2000, Mamedyarova won the Girls U18 section of the World Youth Championships in Oropesa del Mar and took a silver medal at the 34th Chess Olympiad, held in Istanbul. In 2002, she won the European junior girls championship in Baku and a bronze medal at the 35th Chess Olympiad in Bled.

Mamedyarova won the Azerbaijani women's championship in 2001, 2008, 2015. She took part in the Istanbul leg of the FIDE Women's Grand Prix series in 2009.

== Personal life ==
She is the elder sister of Shakhriyar Mamedyarov and Turkan Mamedyarova, both also chess players. Zeinab is married and has a son.
