= Turkan Mamedyarova =

Azerbaijani chess player (born 1989)

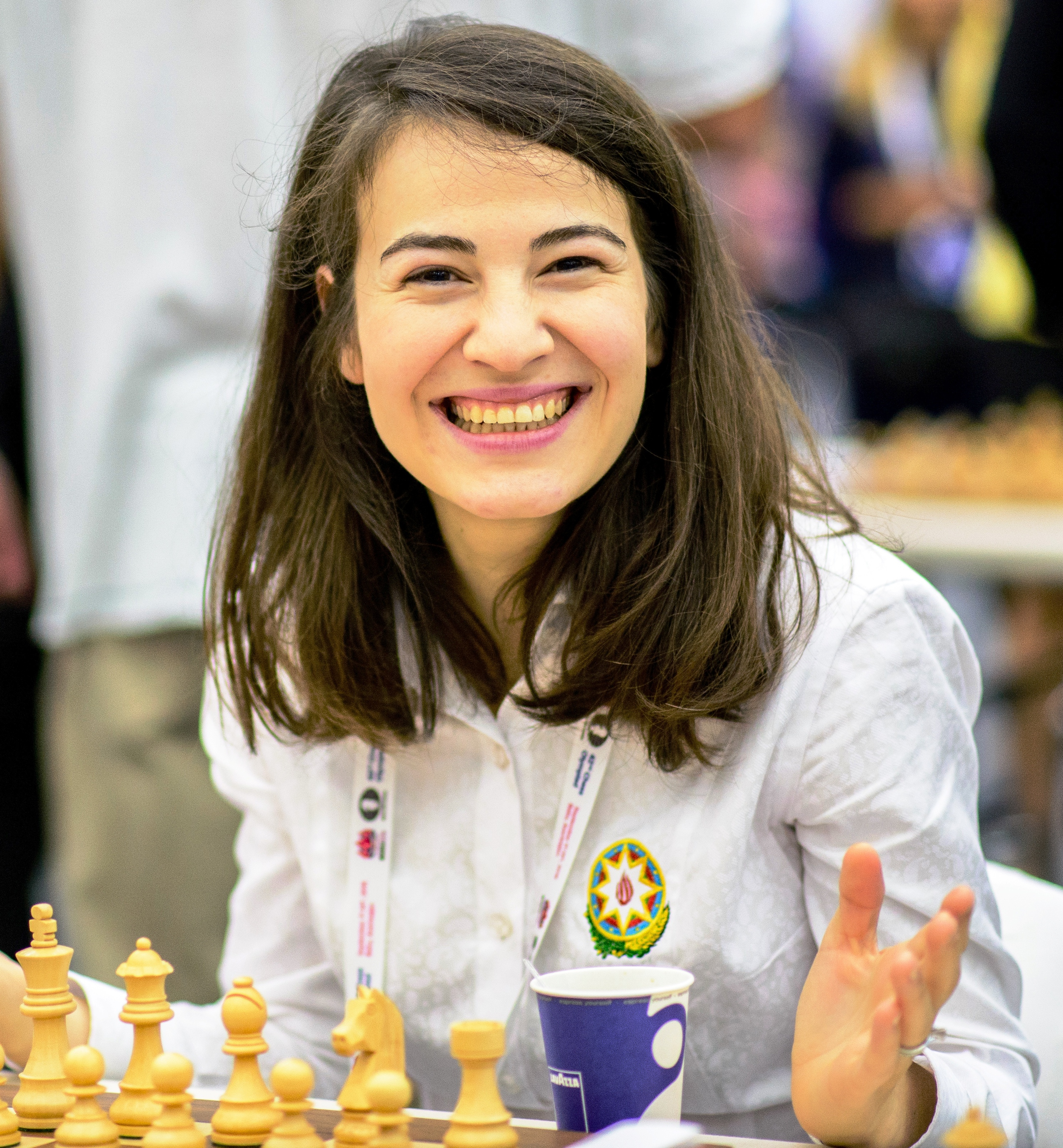
- Turkan Mamedyarova in 2016

Personal information
- Born: 7 August 1989 (age 36) Sumqayit, Azerbaijan SSR, Soviet Union

Chess career
- Country: Azerbaijan
- Title: Woman Grandmaster (2007)
- Peak rating: 2322 (March 2011)

Turkan Hamid qizi Mamedyarova (Azerbaijani: Türkan Həmid qızı Məmədyarova, IPA: [tyɾˈkɑn hæˈmit ɡɯˈzɯ mæmædˈjɑɾovɑ]; born 7 August 1989) is an Azerbaijani chess player who holds the title of Woman Grandmaster (WGM, 2007).

== Chess career ==
Turkan's first chess trainer was her father. Her brother Shakhriyar and sister Zeinab also have titles of chess grandmasters.

Several times represented to Azerbaijan in European Youth Chess Championships and World Youth Chess Championships. Turkan Mamedyarova won gold medal in 2002 European Youth Chess Championship in age category U14 and World medal in 2002 European Youth Chess Championship in age category U14. In 2003 she won Azerbaijani Youth Chess Championship in age category U20. In 2005 Turkan Mamedyarova won one of Wijk aan Zee chess festival tournament.

Twice winner of the Azerbaijani Women's Chess Championships (2005, 2006).

Turkan Mamedyarova played for Azerbaijan in Women's Chess Olympiads:

- In 2002, at first reserve board in the 35th Chess Olympiad (women) in Bled (+0, =2, -0),
- In 2008, at second board in the 38th Chess Olympiad (women) in Dresden (+1, =4, -5),
- In 2010, at second board in the 39th Chess Olympiad (women) in Khanty-Mansiysk (+3, =5, -2),
- In 2012, at third board in the 40th Chess Olympiad (women) in Istanbul (+4, =4, -1),
- In 2014, at fourth board in the 41st Chess Olympiad (women) in Tromsø (+7, =0, -3),
- In 2016, at first board (Azerbaijan 2) in the 42nd Chess Olympiad (women) in Baku (+2, =4, -4).

Turkan Mamedyarova played for Azerbaijan in European Team Chess Championship:

- In 2003, at second board in the 5th European Team Chess Championship (women) in Plovdiv (+3, =3, -3),
- In 2007, at third board in the 7th European Team Chess Championship (women) in Heraklion (+3, =5, -1),
- In 2009, at third board in the 8th European Team Chess Championship (women) in Novi Sad (+5, =1, -2),
- In 2011, at fourth board in the 9th European Team Chess Championship (women) in Porto Carras (+1, =2, -3),
- In 2013, at fourth board in the 10th European Team Chess Championship (women) in Warsaw (+2, =3, -2).

In 2003 she awarded the FIDE Woman International Master (WIM) title and in 2007 the Woman Grandmaster (WGM) title.
