= Vugar Rasulov =

Azerbaijani chess grandmaster (born 1991)

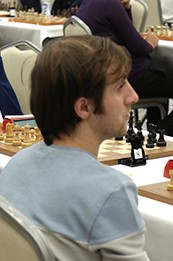

Personal information
- Born: 5 April 1991 (age 35) Ganja, Azerbaijan SSR, Soviet Union

Chess career
- Country: Azerbaijan
- Title: Grandmaster (2011)
- FIDE rating: 2563 (September 2026)
- Peak rating: 2572 (October 2026)

Vugar Rasulov (Azerbaijani: Vüqar Rəsulov; born 5 April 1991) is an Azerbaijani chess Grandmaster.

== Biography ==
Vugar Rasulov repeatedly represented Azerbaijan at the European Youth Chess Championships and World Youth Chess Championships in different age groups, where he won two medals: gold (in 2007, at the European Youth Chess Championship in the U16 age group) and bronze (in 2006, at the European Youth Chess Championship in the U16 age group). In 2006, he played for Azerbaijan in World Youth U16 Chess Olympiad. Vugar Rasulov is multiple winner of Azerbaijani Youth Chess Championships in different age groups, including two consecutive winners in U20 age group (2010, 2011). In 2009, he shared third place in Azerbaijani Chess Championship.

Vugar Rasulov is winner of many international chess tournaments, including winning or first prize in Isfahan (2011), and in Çanakkale chess festival Troya Festival (2014).

In 2009, he was awarded the FIDE International Master (IM) title and received the FIDE Grandmaster (GM) title two years later.
