= Eltaj Safarli =

Azerbaijani chess grandmaster (born 1992)

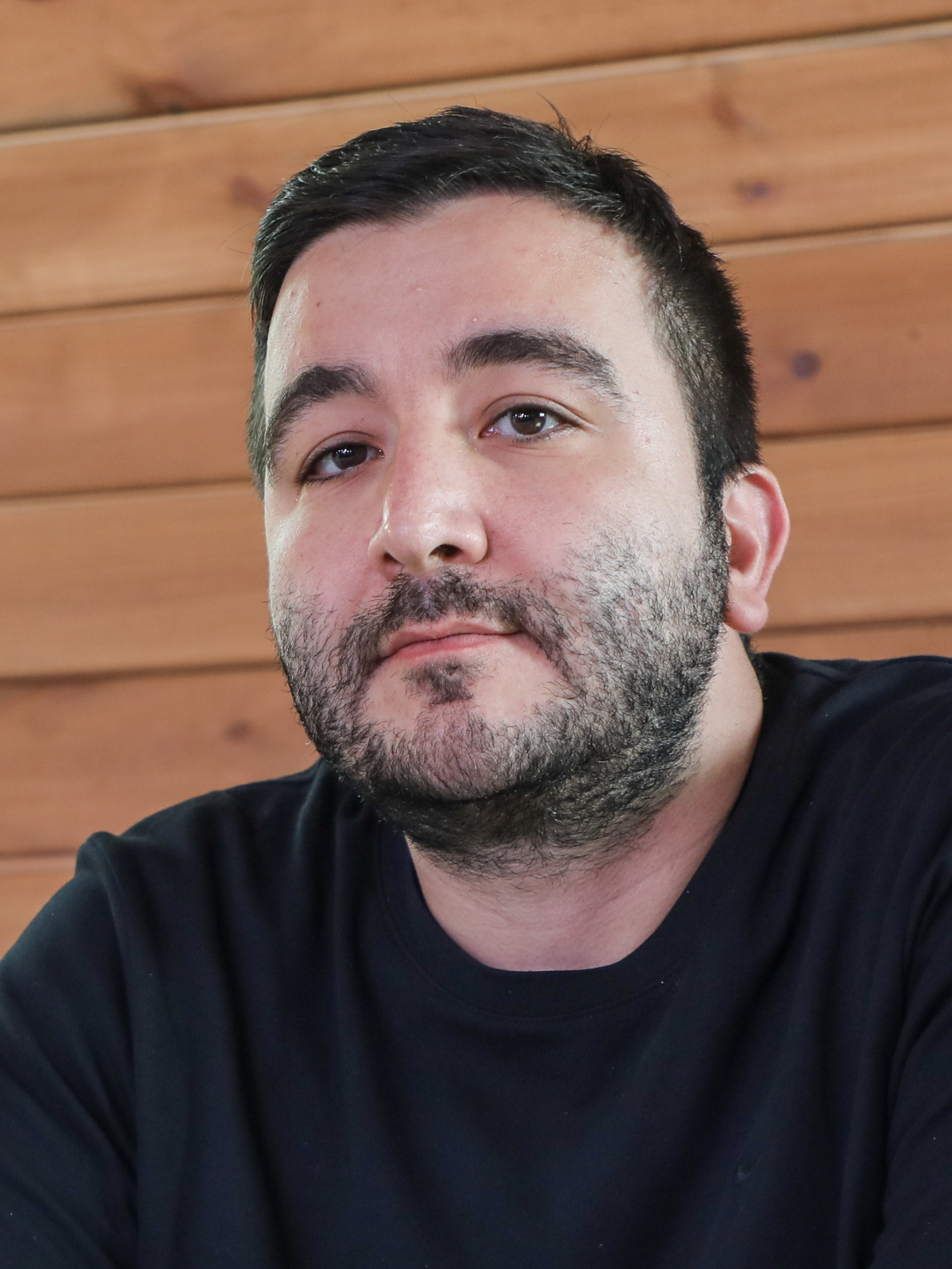
- Safarli in 2026

Personal information
- Born: Eltac Səfərli; May 18, 1992 (age 34) Baku, Azerbaijan
- Spouse: Josefine Heinemann (m. 2024)

Chess career
- Country: Azerbaijan
- Title: Grandmaster (2008)
- FIDE rating: 2616 (September 2026)
- Peak rating: 2694 (October 2016)
- Peak ranking: No. 46 (October 2016)

Eltaj Safarli (Azerbaijani: Eltac Səfərli; born 18 May 1992) is an Azerbaijani chess grandmaster. In October 2016, he reached his all-time-highest rating of, 2694 and was ranked as No. 3 in Azerbaijan and No. 46 in the world.

He entered tournaments from the age of 6, with modest success. Safarli won the Azerbaijan Championships in 2010 and 2016. He won the under 10 World Youth Chess Championship in Heraklion in 2002.

== Team competitions ==
Safarli played in the silver medal-winning Azerbaijani team at the European Team Chess Championship in Porto Carras in 2011, alongside Shakhriyar Mamedyarov, Teimour Radjabov, Vugar Gashimov and Qadir Huseynov.

== Notable tournament victories ==
- 2010 Mikhail Chigorin Memorial, Saint Petersbourg, 1st
- Winner of Azerbaijan Chess Championship (2016)
- Co-winner of the Tata Steel Challengers Tournament 2016 (+6-1=5)

== Personal life ==
In 2024 he married the German woman grandmaster Josefine Heinemann.
