= Azer Mirzoev =

Azerbaijani chess grandmaster (born 1978)

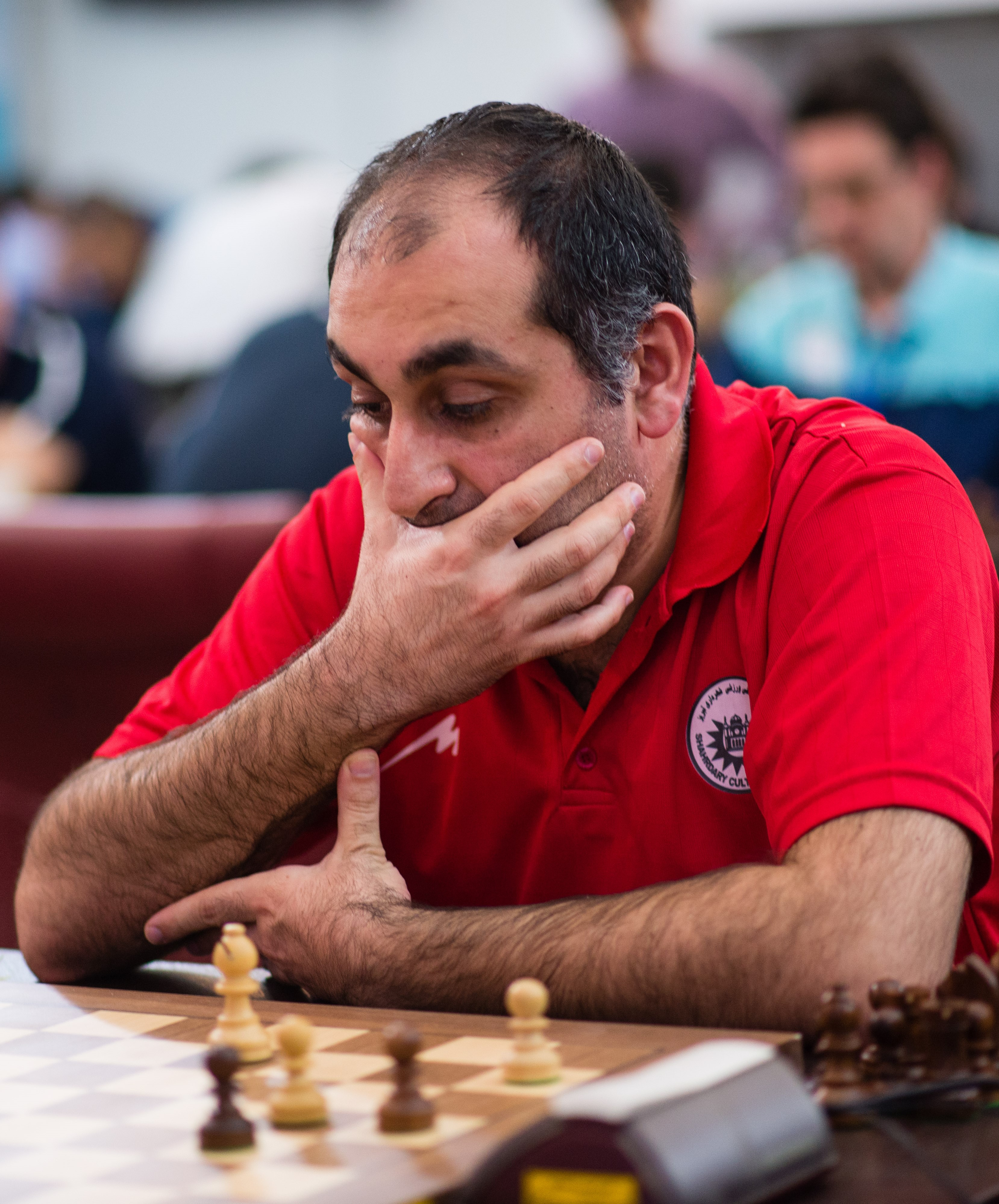

Personal information
- Born: 20 March 1978 (age 48) Baku, Azerbaijan SSR, Soviet Union

Chess career
- Country: Azerbaijan
- Title: Grandmaster (2001)
- FIDE rating: 2414 (July 2026)
- Peak rating: 2617 (November 2009)

Azer Mirzoev (Azerbaijani: Azər Mirzəyev; born 20 March 1978) is an Azerbaijani chess grandmaster.

== Chess career ==
His results in international tournaments include 1st at Elgoibar 2006, 1st at San Sebastián 2009, 1st at Calvi 2010, 1st–2nd with Omar Almeida Quintana at Albacete 2010. He also won the Stadium Casablanca tournament twice. 1st place in Figueres tournament in August 2012. 1st place in Stadium Casablanca in Zaragoza in December 2012. 1st place in 7th Beirut International open, May 2014. 1-2 places in Panevezys GM closed tournament. 1–3 places in Ceske Budejovice GM closed tournament in June 2017. 1st place in Wasselonne open in August 2017. 1st place in Cesenatico open in September 2017. 2nd place in Fuad Jafarov memorial in Baku, January 2018. 2nd place in Kathmandu open in April 2018.1-2 places in Pedro Lezcano memorial in Gran Canaria, Spain, April 2019. 1–2 places in České Budějovice open, Czech Republic in July 2019.
