= Narmin Kazimova =

Azerbaijani chess player (born 1993)

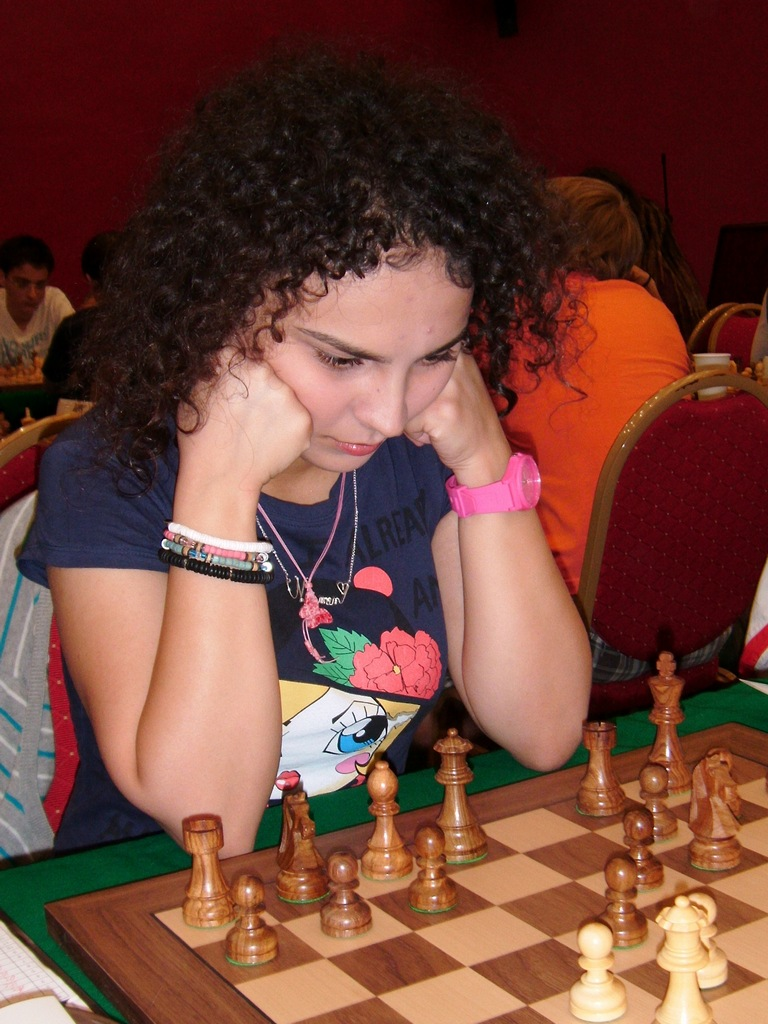
- Kazimova in 2011

Personal information
- Born: July 28, 1993 (age 32) Baku, Azerbaijan
- Spouse: Misratdin Iskandarov

Chess career
- Country: Azerbaijan
- Title: Woman Grandmaster (2015)
- Peak rating: 2364 (April 2016)

Narmin Kazimova (Azerbaijani: Nərmin Kazımova; born July 28, 1993) is an Azerbaijani Woman Grandmaster chess player.

She won the World Youth Chess Championship (Girls) in 2010.

She is a Woman Grandmaster (2015).
