= Chess in Slovakia =

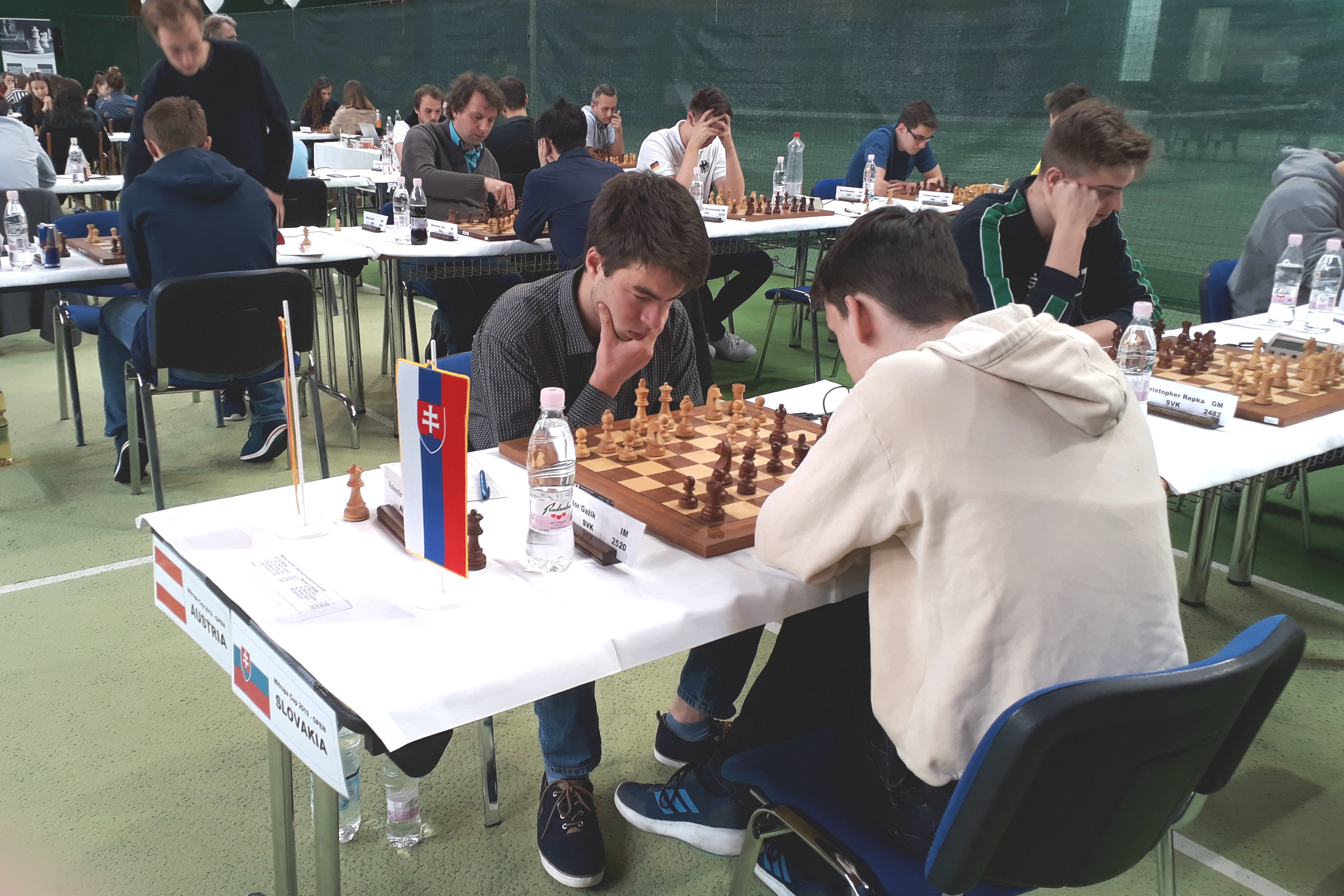
Slovak grandmaster Viktor Gažík playing Austrian grandmaster Valentin Dragnev in 2019.

Organized gameplay of chess (Slovak: šach, Slovak pronunciation: [ˈʃax]) in Slovakia is overseen by the Slovak Chess Federation, founded in 1993 after the dissolution of the Czechoslovak Socialist Republic. The Slovak Chess Federation is a member of FIDE and the European Chess Union, and is headquartered in Nové Zámky. There are over 8,800 registered FIDE players in Slovakia.

== History ==
=== Czechoslovakia (1918–1993) ===
Czechoslovakia hosted the 1931 Chess Olympiad in Prague. The 3rd Women's World Chess Championship also took place during the Olympiad.

Salo Flohr was among the best Czechoslovak players and was one of the first recipients of FIDE's International Grandmaster title. Opening variations named for Flohr include variations in the Caro–Kann Defence, the Ruy Lopez, the English Opening and the Grünfeld Defence. After the German invasion of Czechoslovakia in 1938, Flohr, a Polish-Ukrainian Jew, fled to the Soviet Union with the help of Mikhail Botvinnik.

=== Slovakia (1993–present) ===
The Slovak Chess Federation (Slovak: Slovenský šachový zväz) serves as the governing body of organized chess in Slovakia. It was founded in 1993 after the dissolution of the Czechoslovak Socialist Republic. It regularly organizes the Slovak Open and the Slovak Chess Championship (Open and Women's).

== Notable players ==
- Ján Plachetka (born 1945), grandmaster
- Viktor Gažík (born 2001), grandmaster and 2018 winner of the World Youth Chess Championship U18 group
- Richard Réti (1889–1929), player, author, namesake of the Réti Opening and composer of the Réti endgame study
- Igor Štohl (born 1964), grandmaster and 1993 champion of the Paul Keres Memorial
- Jerguš Pecháč (born 2001), Slovakia's youngest ever grandmaster
