= Repka =

Repka (Slovak feminine: Repková) or Řepka (Czech feminine: Řepková) is a surname of Slovak and Czech origin. Notable people with the surname include:

- Attila Repka (born 1968), Hungarian wrestler
- Christopher Repka (born 1998), Slovak chess grandmaster
- Ed Repka (born 1960), American artist
- Eva Repková (born 1975), Slovak chess player
- František Repka (born 1966), Slovak skier
- Lionel Repka (1935–2015), Canadian ice hockey player
- Oskar Repka (born 1999), Polish footballer
- Tomáš Řepka (born 1974), Czech footballer
