= Mrva =

Mrva (feminine: Mrvová) is a Slovak surname. Notable people with the surname include:

- Alena Mrvová (born 1978), Slovak chess grandmaster
- Mário Mrva (born 1999), Slovak footballer
- Martin Mrva (born 1971), Slovak chess grandmaster
- Maxim Mrva (born 2007), Czech tennis player
- Tomáš Mrva (born 1989), Slovak footballer
