= Slovak Chess Championship =

National chess competition

The Slovak Chess Championship is the chess competition, which determines the best slovak chess player.

== History ==
- 1993 - today - championships of Slovakia
- for Czechoslovak championship see Czechoslovak Chess Championship

== Men's winners ==
=== In Slovakia, part of Czechoslovakia ===
#	Year	Location	Winner
01	1955	Starý Smokovec	Ján Šefc
02	1975	Hlohovec	Ján Plachetka
03	1977	Detva	Ľubomír Ftáčnik
04	1978	Prešov	Jozef Franzen
05	1979	Dolný Kubín	Ľubomír Ftáčnik
06	1981	Bardejov	Ladislav Dobrovolský
07	1983	Nová Baňa	Róbert Tibenský
08	1984	Čadca	Igor Štohl
09	1985	Piešťany	Ján Baňas
10	1986	Bratislava	Igor Gažík
11	1987	Šaľa	Róbert Tibenský
12	1988	Trnava	Peter Petrán
13	1989	Michalovce	Martin Mrva
14	1991	Trenčín	Ivan Novák

=== In independent Slovakia ===
#	Year	Location	Winner
01	1993	Topoľčianky	Ján Plachetka
02	1994	Topoľčianky	Róbert Tibenský
03	1995	Trenčín	Róbert Tibenský
04	1996	Martin	Róbert Tibenský
05	1997	Prešov	Ladislav Salai
06	1998	Prievidza	Tomáš Balogh
07	1999	Nové Zámky	Ján Baňas
08	2000	Zvolen	Ján Markoš
09	2001	Prešov	Vítězslav Priehoda
10	2002	Galanta	Sergei Movsesian
11	2003	Vysoké Tatry	Mikuláš Maník
12	2004	Zemplínska Šírava	Eduard Hagara
13	2005	Trenčianske Teplice	Tomáš Petrík
14	2006	Banská Štiavnica	Tomáš Petrík
15	2007	Banská Štiavnica	Sergei Movsesian
16	2008	Zvolen	Peter Vavrák
17	2009	Vysoké Tatry	Martin Mrva
18	2010	Banská Štiavnica	Marián Jurčík
19	2011	Banská Štiavnica	Ján Markoš
20	2012	Banská Štiavnica	Ján Markoš
21	2013	Banská Štiavnica	Peter Michalik
22	2014	Prievidza	Peter Michalik
23	2015	Banská Štiavnica	Peter Michalik
24	2016	Banská Štiavnica	Milan Pacher
25	2017	Banská Štiavnica	Christopher Repka
26	2018	Banská Štiavnica	Christopher Repka

== Women's winners ==
#	Year	Location	Winner
01	1991	Trenčín	Ivana Sedláková
02	1993	Topoľčianky	Jarmila Kačincová
03	1994	Martin	Andrea Cigániková
04	1996	Žiar nad Hronom	Mirjana Medic
11	2003	Vysoké Tatry	Eva Repková
16	2008	Zvolen	Mária Machalová
17	2009	Vysoké Tatry	Regina Pokorná
18	2010	Banská Štiavnica	Eva Repková
19	2011	Banská Štiavnica	Julia Kochetkova
20	2012	Banská Štiavnica	Julia Kochetkova
21	2013	Banská Štiavnica	Eva Repková
22	2014		Zuzana Borošová
23	2015		Monika Motyčáková
