= Vedant Panesar =

Indian chess player (born 2003)

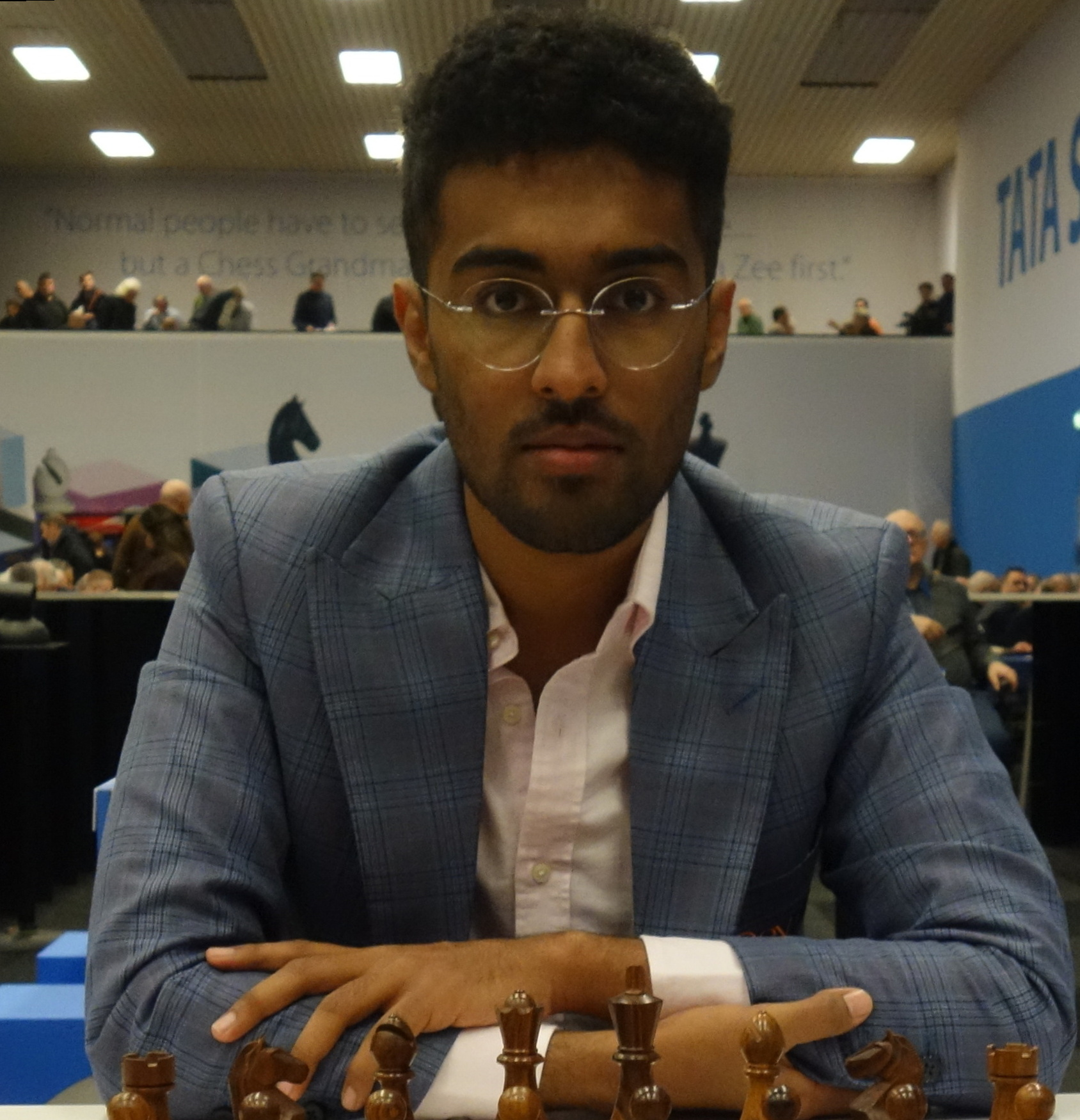

Personal information
- Born: September 18, 2003 (age 22) Mumbai, India

Chess career
- Country: India
- Title: FIDE Master (2021)
- FIDE rating: 2439 (July 2026)
- Peak rating: 2462 (March 2024)

Vedant Panesar is an Indian chess player.

== Chess career ==
He is coached by Hungarian grandmaster Krisztián Szabó.

In October 2019, he defeated Viktor Gažík in the U18 section of the World Youth Chess Championship, who had been the defending champion.

He achieved the requirements for the IM title in late 2023, but chose not to apply for the title.

In February 2025, he won the Tata Steel Qualifiers 2025, earning the right to play in the Challengers section of the Tata Steel Chess Tournament 2026. Later that month, he won the Aquinas International School Rapid Rating Open, beating Atharva Madkar on tiebreak scores.

In May 2025, he won the Motilalji Firodiya Rating Open, beating Rahul Sangma on tiebreak scores.
