= Regina Pokorná =

Slovak-Austrian chess player (born 1982)

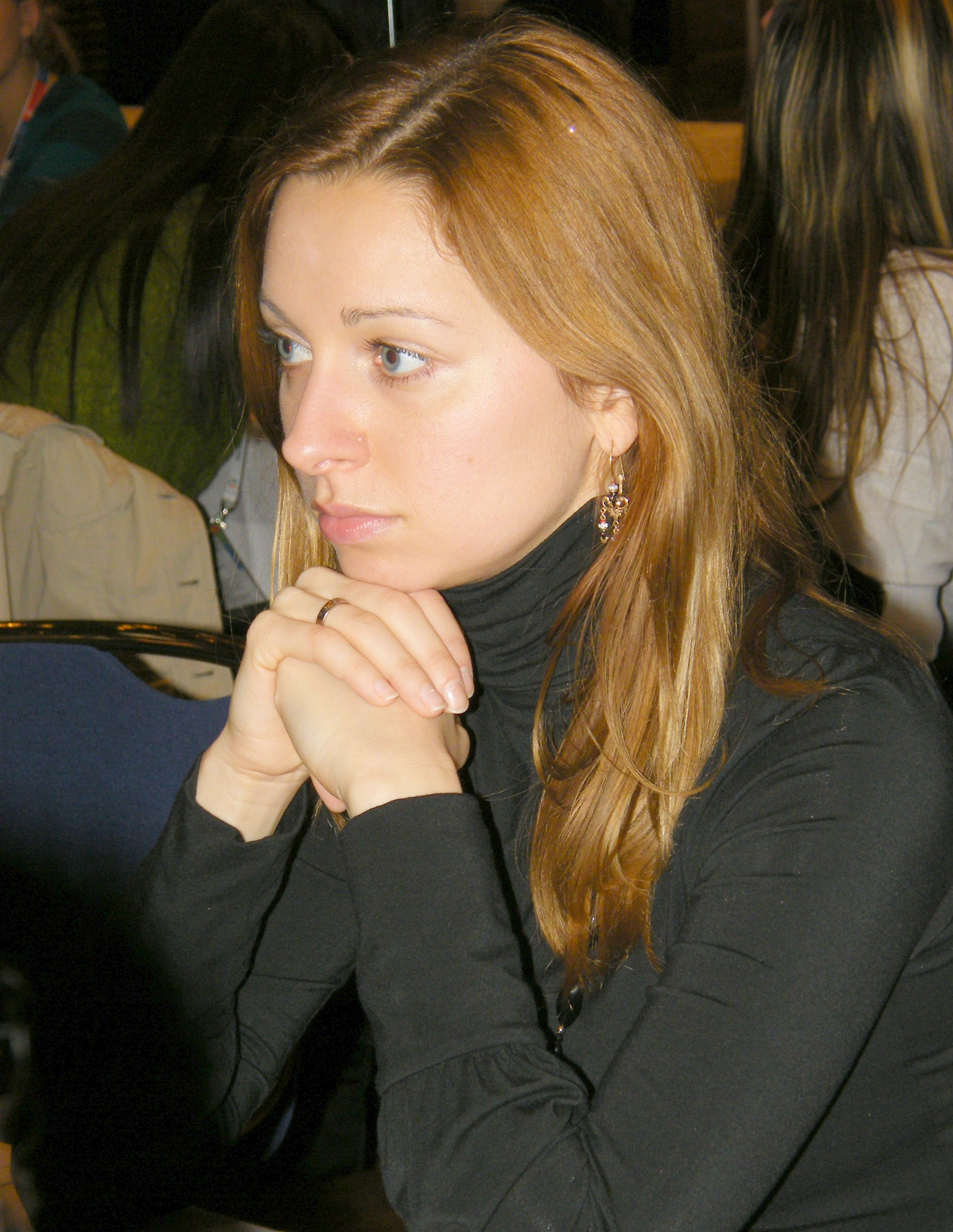
- Regina Pokorná at the 38th Chess Olympiad in Dresden, Germany 2008

Personal information
- Born: Regina Theissl Pokorná; 18 January 1982 (age 44) Bratislava, Czechoslovakia

Chess career
- Country: Slovakia (until 2015); Austria (since 2015)
- Title: Woman Grandmaster (2001)
- Peak rating: 2429 (July 2003)

Regina Theissl Pokorná (born 18 January 1982) is a Slovak-Austrian chess player holding the title Woman Grandmaster (WGM).

== Chess career ==
Pokorná was trained by Grandmaster Ján Plachetka from 1997. Pokorná won the European girls under 10 championship in 1992 and the Slovak girls under 18 championship in 1996, 1997 and 1999. Also in 1999 she won the European Junior Girls' Chess Championship in Patras, Greece.

Pokorná represented Slovakia in eight Women's Chess Olympiads between 1998 and 2012. Her best result was in the 37th Chess Olympiad in Turin 2006, where she scored 7/10 and finished eighth among players playing board 3.

She represented Slovakia in three European Women's Team Chess Championships from 1997 to 2001, and won the team gold medal and individual bronze medal in Batumi 1999.

In 2009, Pokorná won the Slovak Women's Chess Championship. She has also won, or jointly won, a series of strong women's chess tournaments, including the Mediterranean Flowers tournaments in Rijeka in 2001, 2002, 2005, and 2009, the EWS Cup in Jakarta 2007, and the Mediterranean Golden Island tournament in Vrbnik 2008.

In 2015, Theissl Pokorná transferred federations to represent Austria. She represented Austria in the European Championships held that year, in which they finished ninth, their best-ever performance.

In 2019 Theissl Pokorná won the Austrian Women's Chess Championship.

== Personal life ==
Pokorná was born in Bratislava. She went to school at the Metodova Gymnasium in Bratislava. Her sister Renata Pokorna is also a FIDE-rated chess player; she also has a brother called Richard. In 2010 Pokorná was living in Romania and working as a project manager.

Her image was used in a sheet of four postage stamps, featuring leading female chess players, called "Chess Masters", issued in Chad in 2010. She has two children.

== Notable games ==
Pokorná vs. Gaprindashvili, Silivri 2003

Position: a8 black rook, b8 black queen, f8 black knight, h8 black king, b7 black pawn, g7 black bishop, a6 black pawn, c6 black bishop, h6 white bishop, f5 black pawn, c4 white bishop, h4 white queen, c3 white knight, h3 white pawn, a2 white pawn, b2 white pawn, c2 white pawn, g2 white pawn, g1 white king

Final position
- Regina Pokorna vs Nona Gaprindashvili, 4th European Championship (Women), (2003), Sicilian Defense: Classical Variation (B57), 1-0
