= Eva Repková =

Slovak chess player (born 1975)

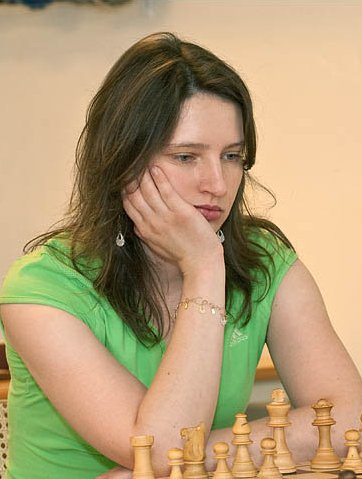
- Eva Repková playing in the Summer chess tournament in Aarhus, Denmark 2009

Personal information
- Born: 16 January 1975 (age 51) Stará Ľubovňa, Czechoslovakia

Chess career
- Country: Czechoslovakia (until 1992); Slovakia (1992–97, since 2001); Lebanon (1997–2001)
- Title: International Master (2007); Woman Grandmaster (1995)
- Peak rating: 2447 (September 2010)

Eva Repková (born 16 January 1975 in Stará Ľubovňa) is a Slovak chess player holding the FIDE titles of International Master (IM) and Woman Grandmaster (WGM). She was Czechoslovak Women's Champion in 1991 and Slovak Women's Champion in 2003, 2010 and 2013.

== Chess career ==
Repková learned to play chess at the age of five, while watching her parents play chess on Sundays. She became Slovak Women's Champion in 1987 at the age of 12, and won the Czechoslovak Women's Chess Championship in Pardubice in 1991.

Repková won silver medals in the World Girl's Under-14 Chess Championship in Timișoara 1988, and the World Girl's Under-18 Chess Championships in Guarapuava 1991 and Bratislava 1993. In 1995 she came second, on tie break, behind Nino Khurtsidze in the World Girl's Under-20 Chess Championship in Halle.

Repková represented Czechoslovakia in the 30th Chess Olympiad in 1992, and has represented Slovakia on board 1 of the Women's team in eight Chess Olympiads between 1994 and 2016. Her best result was in her Olympiad debut in Manila 1992, where she scored 9½/13 and finished fourth on board 3.

She represented Czechoslovakia in 1992 and Slovakia in 2001 in the European Women's Team Chess Championship, and won the individual silver medal in León 2001.

After her first marriage to Lebanese International Master Fadi Eid, Repková won the Arab Women's Chess Championship in Agadir 1998 and Beirut 2000. She came second in the Asian Women's Chess Championship twice, behind Subbaraman Vijayalakshmi in Tehran 1997, and behind Xu Yuhua in the Genting Highlands 1998.

She won the Slovak Women's Chess Championship in Tatranské Zruby 2003, in Banská Štiavnica 2010, and in Banská Štiavnica 2013.

She won various international tournaments, including the Mediterranean Flower tournament in Rijeka 2003 and 2013, the Mediterranean Golden Island (Women) in Punat 2003 and Malinska 2005, and the Summer-A IM in Aarhus 2009.

Repková represented Slovakia in the open chess Mitropa Cup in 2005 and 2006, winning the team bronze in Steinbrunn 2005. She represented Slovakia in the women's chess Mitropa Cup in Meissen 2013, winning both the individual and team gold medals.

Repková was awarded the title of Woman Grandmaster (WGM) in 1995, and International Master (IM) in 2007.

== Personal life ==
Repková married Lebanese IM Fadi Eid, and represented Lebanon from 1997 until 2001. In October 1998, their son Christopher Repka was born; he won the Slovak Junior Chess Championship in his age group several times and became a GM in 2018.

She is from Nová Ľubovňa.
