= Christopher Repka =

Slovak chess grandmaster (born 1998)

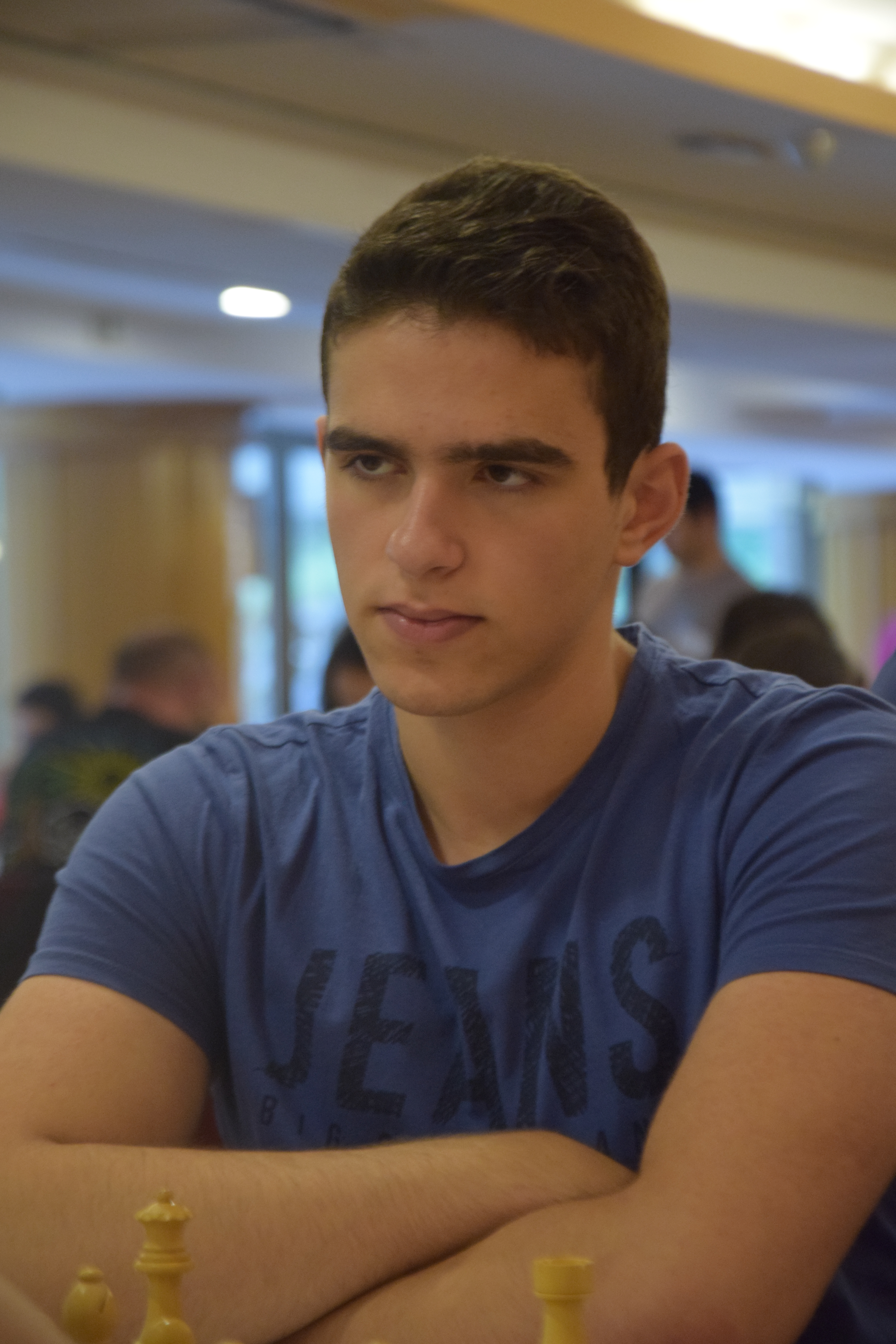
- Repka at the 2018 Andorra Open

Personal information
- Born: 6 October 1998 (age 27) Stará Ľubovňa, Slovakia

Chess career
- Country: Slovakia
- Title: Grandmaster (2018)
- FIDE rating: 2487 (July 2026)
- Peak rating: 2534 (May 2018)

Christopher Repka (born 6 October 1998) is a Slovak chess grandmaster. He is a two-time Slovak Chess Champion. His father comes from Lebanon and his mother from Nová Ľubovňa.

== Chess career ==
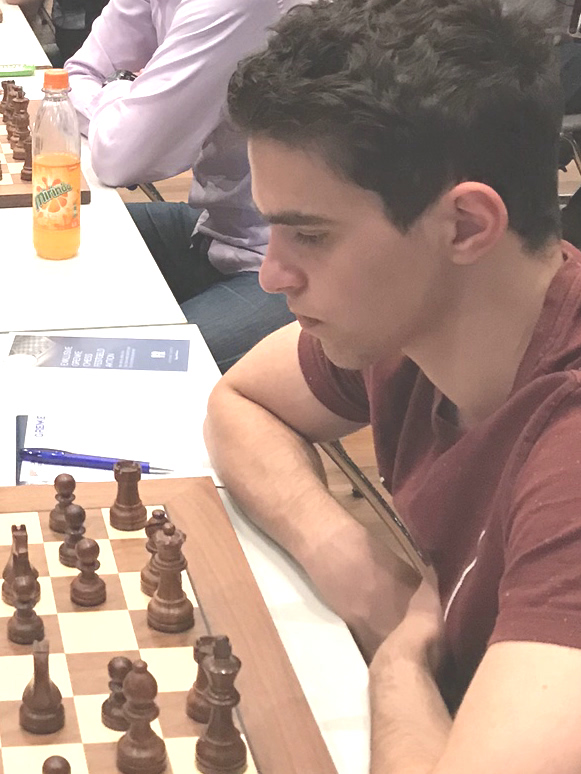
Repka at the Grenke Chess Open 2019

Born on 6 October 1998, Repka earned his international master (IM) title in 2016 and his grandmaster (GM) title in 2018, becoming the youngest GM in Slovak history. He won the Slovak Chess Championship in 2017. He is the No. 2 ranked Slovak player as of May 2018. He won the Slovak Championship again in 2018.

== Personal life ==
Christopher Repka is the son of the Slovak IM Eva Repková and Lebanese IM Fadi Eid.
