= Mikuláš Maník =

Slovak chess grandmaster (born 1975)

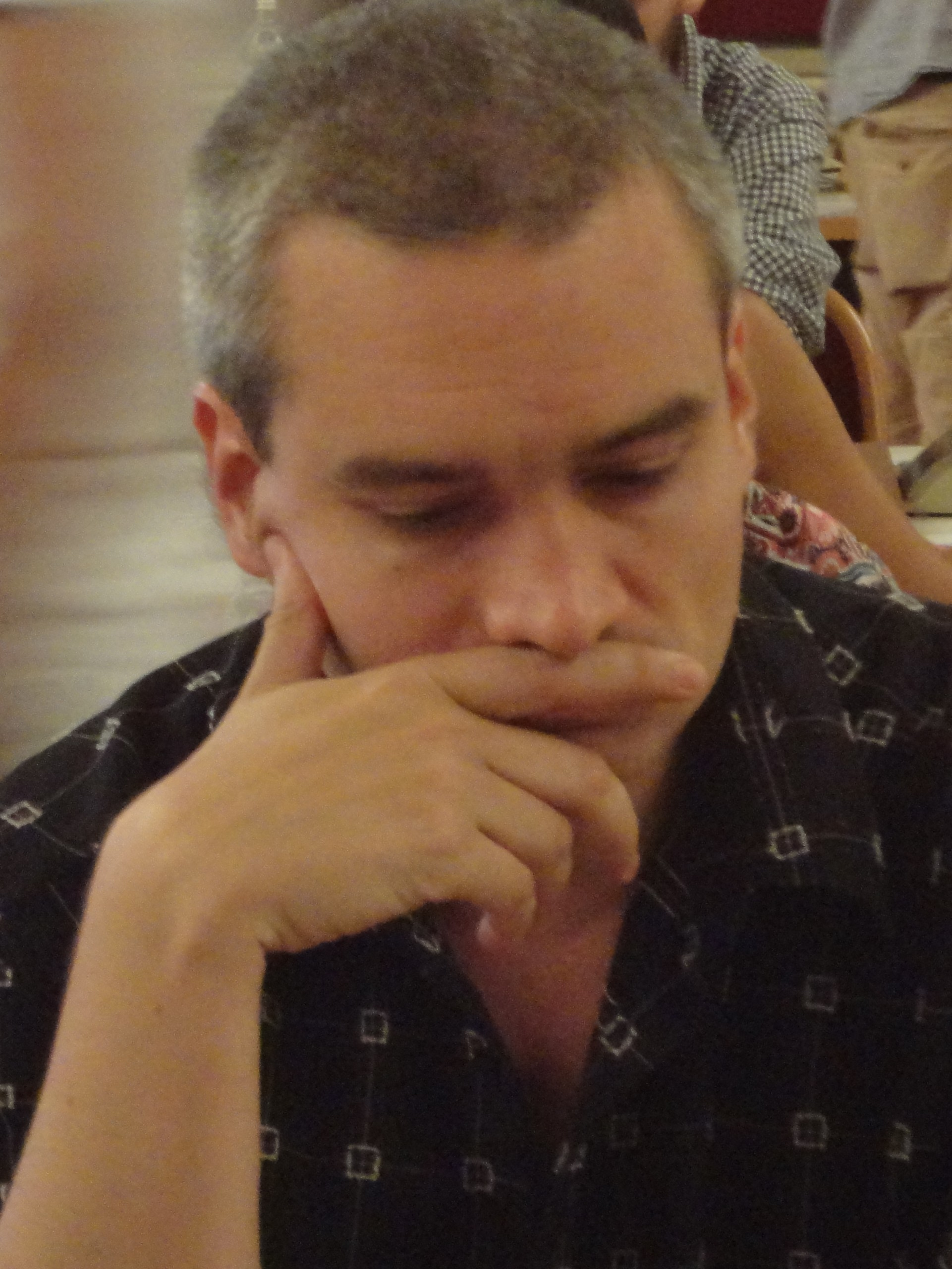
- Mikuláš Maník in 2015

Personal information
- Born: 26 May 1975 (age 51) Košice, Czechoslovakia

Chess career
- Country: Slovakia
- Title: Grandmaster (2006)
- Peak rating: 2512 (January 2005)

Mikuláš Maník (born 26 May 1975), is a Slovak chess Grandmaster (GM) (2006), Slovak Chess Championship winner (2003).

== Biography ==
In 2000s Mikuláš Maník was one of the leading Slovak chess players. In 2003, he won Slovak Chess Championship. Mikuláš Maník has achieved many successes in international chess tournaments, winning or sharing first places among others in Lázně Bohdaneč (1996), Litomyšl (1997), Tatranská Lomnica (1998), Pardubice (1998), Tatrzańskie Zręby (2001), Vienna (2003), Prešov (2004), Česká Třebová (2006).

Mikuláš Maník played for Slovakia in the Chess Olympiads:

- In 2002, at third reserve board in the 35th Chess Olympiad in Bled (+2, =3, -1),
- In 2004, at reserve board in the 36th Chess Olympiad in Calvià (+4, =5, -2).

Mikuláš Maník played for Slovakia in the European Team Chess Championship:

- In 1999, at fourth board in the 12th European Team Chess Championship in Batumi (+2, =4, -3).

In 2006, he was awarded the FIDE Grandmaster (GM) title.
