= Ján Šefc =

Slovak chess player

Personal information
- Born: 10 December 1924
- Died: 17 May 2014 (aged 89)

Chess career
- Country: Czechoslovakia; Slovakia

Ján Šefc (10 December 1924 – 17 May 2014), was a Slovak chess player, Czechoslovak Chess Championship winner (1955), European Team Chess Championship team medalist (1957).

== Biography ==
Ján Šefc grew up in Košice, but after the occupation of the city of Hungary in 1938, his parents moved to Prešov. In 1949, after the death of his father Ján Šefc began to work in Bratislava, where he studied medicine. In 1953 Ján Šefc became a professional chess trainer. He was repeated participant of Czechoslovak Chess Championship, where in 1954 Ján Šefc won bronze, and in 1955 in Prague became the winner. In 1956, he ranked 6th in Wilhelm Steinitz memorial in Mariánské Lázně.

Ján Šefc played for Czechoslovakia in the Chess Olympiads:

- In 1956, at third board in the 12th Chess Olympiad in Moscow (+1, =5, -3),
- In 1958, at second reserve board in the 13th Chess Olympiad in Munich (+2, =3, -1).

Ján Šefc played for Czechoslovakia in the European Team Chess Championship:

- In 1957, at sixth board in the 1st European Team Chess Championship in Vienna (+0, =2, -3) and won team bronze medal.

Among Ján Šefc chess students were grandmasters Ľubomír Ftáčnik and Igor Štohl, and an international master Róbert Tibenský. He was a member of the chess club Slovan from Bratislava.
