= Milan Pacher =

Slovak chess grandmaster (born 1990)

Personal information
- Born: 3 October 1990 (age 35) Banská Bystrica, Czechoslovakia

Chess career
- Country: Slovakia
- Title: Grandmaster (2016)
- Peak rating: 2508 (March 2016)

Milan Pacher (born 3 October 1990) is a Slovak chess grandmaster.

== Chess career ==
He won the 2016 Slovak Chess Championship.

In January 2018, he won the Prague Open with a score of 7.5/9, defeating Ilya Chekletsov on tiebreak scores.

In June 2021, he won his game against Abhimanyu Mishra in the Vezérképző GM Mix tournament, though Mishra would later become the world's youngest grandmaster after the tournament.

In March 2021, he tied for first with Leon Luke Mendonca in the 2nd Kumania GM chess tournament, but lost the championship on tiebreaks.
