= Tata Steel Chess Tournament 2026 =

Chess competition

| | Masters Champion | Challengers Champion |
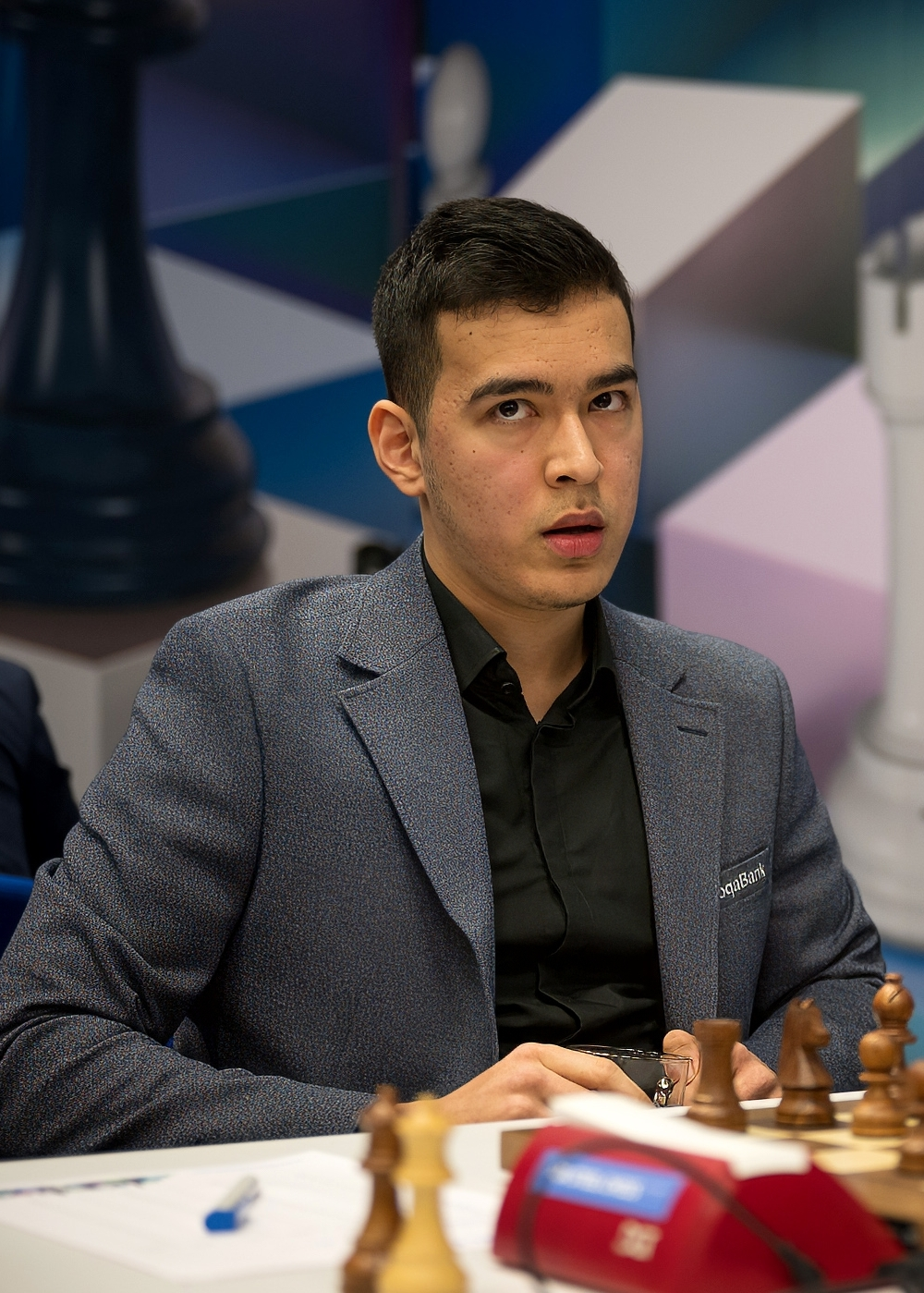
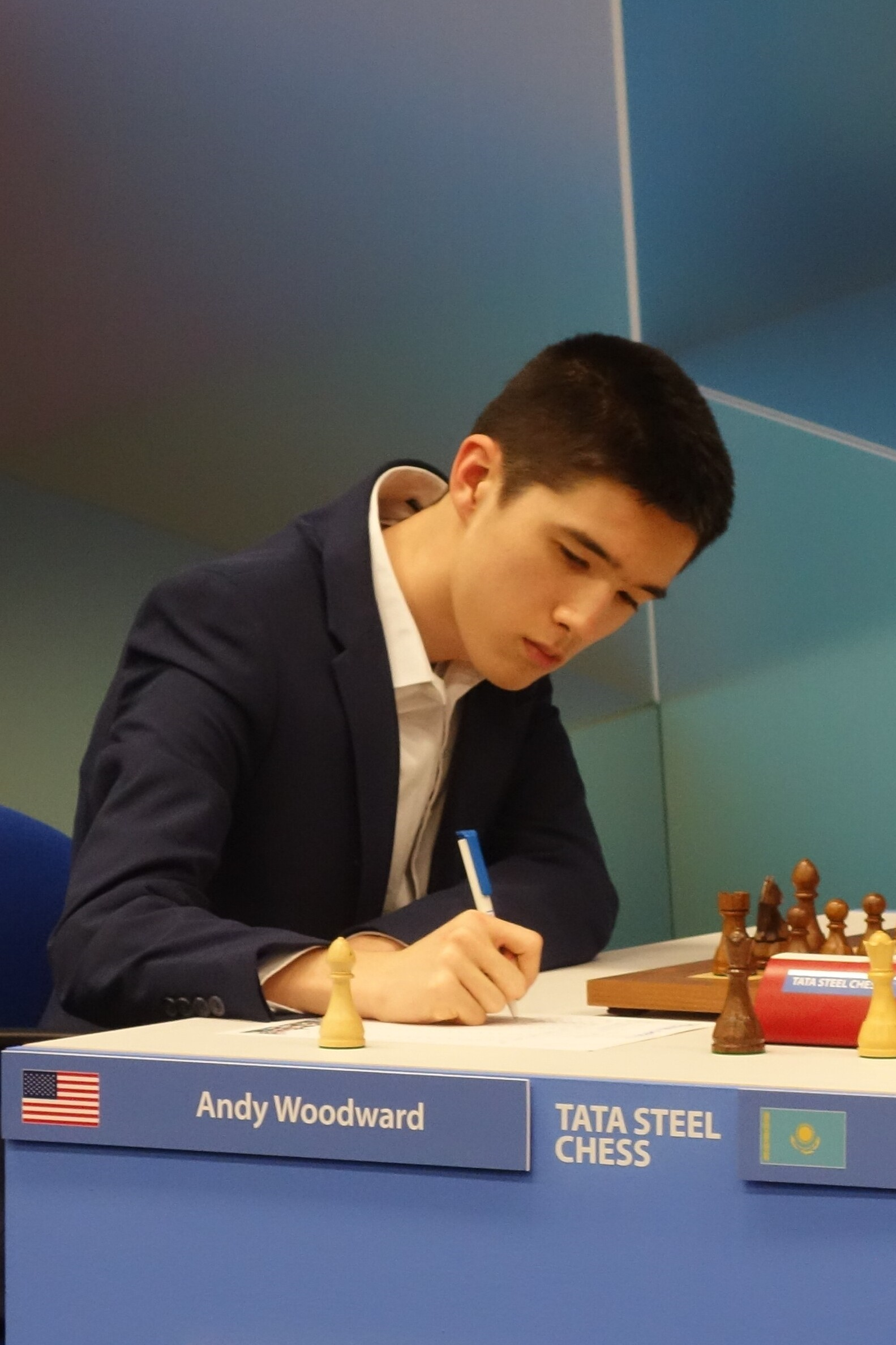
| | (Uzbekistan) Nodirbek Abdusattorov | (United States) Andy Woodward |
| 9/13 | Scores | 10/13 |
| | Born 18 September 2004; 21 years old | Born 2 May 2010; 15 years old |

The Tata Steel Chess Tournament 2026 was the 88th edition of the annual chess tournament held in Wijk aan Zee. It was held from 16 January to 1 February 2026. The field of 14 players in the Masters section included defending champion R Praggnanandhaa and Thai Dai Van Nguyen, the winner of the Tata Steel Challengers 2025. This was also the youngest ever field of players in the annual Tata Steel chess tournament, with the oldest player, Anish Giri, being only 31 years old.

The Masters section was won by Nodirbek Abdusattorov. American grandmaster Andy Woodward won the Challengers section.

== Organization ==
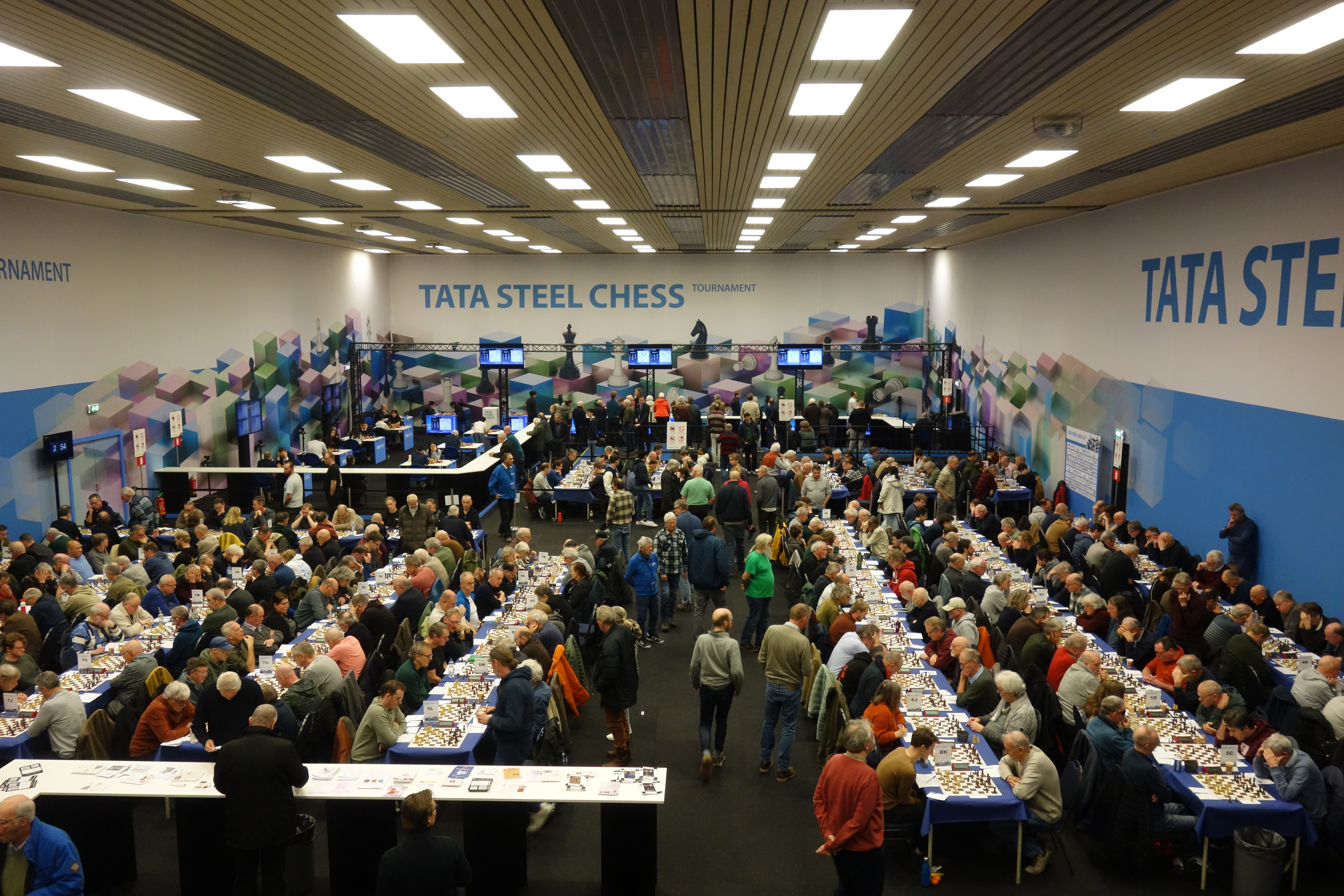
Tata Steel Chess 2026

The tournament was a fourteen-player, single round-robin tournament, meaning there were 13 rounds with each player facing the others once.

The field of 14 players in the Masters section included defending champion R Praggnanandhaa, the winner of the Tata Steel Challengers 2025 Thai Dai Van Nguyen and the reigning World Chess Champion, Gukesh Dommaraju. This was also the youngest ever field of players in the annual Tata Steel chess tournament, with the oldest player Anish Giri, being only 31 years old.

=== Regulations ===
For the first time, the tournament was played with a time control of 120 minutes for the first 40 moves, followed by 30 minutes for the rest of the game with a 30-second increment per move starting from move 41, matching the Candidates Tournament time control. Players got 1 point for a win, ½ point for a draw and 0 points for a loss.

Tiebreaks for the first place would have been addressed as follows:

- Players would play two blitz chess games at 3 minutes plus 2 seconds per move. If three or more than four players had tied, a single round-robin would be played. If only four players were tied, a single elimination tournament would be played.
- Two players still tied for first after the blitz chess games would play a "sudden death" game with white receiving 2½ minutes while black receives 3 minutes plus both players would gain 2 seconds per move. A drawing of lots determined which player had white. If the game had been drawn, the players would have switched colors and played again with that colour for the next two games, and then repeated this process until a decisive result was obtained.

== Standings ==
=== Masters ===
All players in the Masters section are grandmasters.

88th Tata Steel Masters, 16 January – 1 February 2026, Wijk aan Zee, Netherlands, Category XIX (2723)
| | Player | Rating | 1 | 2 | 3 | 4 | 5 | 6 | 7 | 8 | 9 | 10 | 11 | 12 | 13 | 14 | Total | SB | TPR |
|---|---|---|---|---|---|---|---|---|---|---|---|---|---|---|---|---|---|---|---|
| 1 | Nodirbek Abdusattorov (Uzbekistan) | 2751 | | ½ | ½ | ½ | 1 | 1 | ½ | 0 | ½ | 1 | 1 | ½ | 1 | 1 | 9 | 54.75 | 2862 |
| 2 | Javokhir Sindarov (Uzbekistan) | 2726 | ½ | | ½ | ½ | ½ | 1 | 1 | ½ | ½ | ½ | ½ | ½ | 1 | 1 | 8½ | 52.00 | 2833 |
| 3 | Jorden van Foreest (Netherlands) | 2703 | ½ | ½ | | ½ | 1 | ½ | 0 | 1 | ½ | ½ | ½ | 1 | ½ | ½ | 7½ | 47.50 | 2782 |
| 4 | Hans Niemann (United States) | 2725 | ½ | ½ | ½ | | 0 | ½ | ½ | ½ | 1 | ½ | ½ | 1 | ½ | 1 | 7½ | 45.00 | 2780 |
| 5 | Vincent Keymer (Germany) | 2776 | 0 | ½ | 0 | 1 | | 0 | ½ | 1 | 0 | ½ | 1 | 1 | 1 | 1 | 7½ | 42.50 | 2776 |
| 6 | Matthias Blübaum (Germany) | 2679 | 0 | 0 | ½ | ½ | 1 | | ½ | 1 | ½ | 1 | ½ | ½ | ½ | ½ | 7 | 43.50 | 2756 |
| 7 | Yağız Kaan Erdoğmuş (Turkey) | 2658 | ½ | 0 | 1 | ½ | ½ | ½ | | 0 | 1 | 0 | ½ | ½ | 1 | 1 | 7 | 42.00 | 2757 |
| 8 | Anish Giri (Netherlands) | 2760 | 1 | ½ | 0 | ½ | 0 | 0 | 1 | | ½ | 1 | ½ | ½ | ½ | ½ | 6½ | 42.50 | 2720 |
| 9 | Vladimir Fedoseev (Slovenia) | 2705 | ½ | ½ | ½ | 0 | 1 | ½ | 0 | ½ | | 0 | ½ | 1 | 1 | ½ | 6½ | 40.00 | 2725 |
| 10 | Gukesh Dommaraju (India) | 2754 | 0 | ½ | ½ | ½ | ½ | 0 | 1 | 0 | 1 | | ½ | ½ | ½ | 1 | 6½ | 39.25 | 2721 |
| 11 | R Praggnanandhaa (India) | 2758 | 0 | ½ | ½ | ½ | 0 | ½ | ½ | ½ | ½ | ½ | | 1 | 0 | ½ | 5½ | 34.50 | 2664 |
| 12 | Aravindh Chithambaram (India) | 2700 | ½ | ½ | 0 | 0 | 0 | ½ | ½ | ½ | 0 | ½ | 0 | | ½ | 1 | 4½ | 27.50 | 2615 |
| 13 | Arjun Erigaisi (India) | 2775 | 0 | 0 | ½ | ½ | 0 | ½ | 0 | ½ | 0 | ½ | 1 | ½ | | ½ | 4½ | 26.75 | 2609 |
| 14 | Thai Dai Van Nguyen (Czechia) | 2656 | 0 | 0 | ½ | 0 | 0 | ½ | 0 | ½ | ½ | 0 | ½ | 0 | ½ | | 3 | 18.75 | 2517 |

=== Challengers ===
88th Tata Steel Challengers, 16 January – 1 February 2026, Wijk aan Zee, Netherlands, Category XII (2544)
| | Player | Rating | 1 | 2 | 3 | 4 | 5 | 6 | 7 | 8 | 9 | 10 | 11 | 12 | 13 | 14 | Total |
|---|---|---|---|---|---|---|---|---|---|---|---|---|---|---|---|---|---|
| 1 | GM Andy Woodward (United States) | 2608 | | 0 | ½ | 1 | 0 | 1 | 1 | 1 | ½ | 1 | 1 | 1 | 1 | 1 | 10 |
| 2 | GM Vasyl Ivanchuk (Ukraine) | 2605 | 1 | | 1 | ½ | ½ | ½ | ½ | 1 | 1 | 1 | 0 | ½ | 1 | 1 | 9½ |
| 3 | GM Aydin Suleymanli (Azerbaijan) | 2628 | ½ | 0 | | 1 | ½ | 1 | 1 | ½ | 0 | 1 | 1 | ½ | 1 | 1 | 9 |
| 4 | GM Marc'Andria Maurizzi (France) | 2611 | 0 | ½ | 0 | | 1 | ½ | 1 | 0 | 1 | ½ | ½ | 1 | 1 | 1 | 8 |
| 5 | GM Bibisara Assaubayeva (Kazakhstan) | 2497 | 1 | ½ | ½ | 0 | | ½ | ½ | 0 | ½ | ½ | 1 | 1 | ½ | 1 | 7½ |
| 6 | IM Faustino Oro (Argentina) | 2516 | 0 | ½ | 0 | ½ | ½ | | ½ | 0 | ½ | 1 | 1 | ½ | 1 | 1 | 7 |
| 7 | IM Carissa Yip (United States) | 2466 | 0 | ½ | 0 | 0 | ½ | ½ | | 1 | 1 | 0 | ½ | 1 | 1 | 1 | 7 |
| 8 | GM Max Warmerdam (Netherlands) | 2576 | 0 | 0 | ½ | 1 | 1 | 1 | 0 | | ½ | ½ | ½ | 1 | 0 | ½ | 6½ |
| 9 | GM Velimir Ivić (Serbia) | 2638 | ½ | 0 | 1 | 0 | ½ | ½ | 0 | ½ | | ½ | 1 | ½ | 0 | 1 | 6 |
| 10 | GM Daniil Yuffa (Spain) | 2604 | 0 | 0 | 0 | ½ | ½ | 0 | 1 | ½ | ½ | | 1 | ½ | 1 | 0 | 5½ |
| 11 | GM Erwin l'Ami (Netherlands) | 2634 | 0 | 1 | 0 | ½ | 0 | 0 | ½ | ½ | 0 | 0 | | ½ | 1 | 1 | 5 |
| 12 | FM Vedant Panesar (India) | 2406 | 0 | ½ | ½ | 0 | 0 | ½ | 0 | 0 | ½ | ½ | ½ | | 0 | 1 | 4 |
| 13 | IM Lu Miaoyi (China) | 2431 | 0 | 0 | 0 | 0 | ½ | 0 | 0 | 1 | 1 | 0 | 0 | 1 | | 0 | 3½ |
| 14 | IM Eline Roebers (Netherlands) | 2398 | 0 | 0 | 0 | 0 | 0 | 0 | 0 | ½ | 0 | 1 | 0 | 0 | 1 | | 2½ |

== Results by round ==
=== Masters ===
Round 1 – 17 January 2026
| Yagiz Kaan Erdogmus | ½–½ | Nodirbek Abdusattorov |
| Aravindh Chithambaram | ½–½ | Matthias Bluebaum |
| Hans Niemann | 1–0 | Vladimir Fedoseev |
| Vincent Keymer | 1–0 | Anish Giri |
| Javokhir Sindarov | ½–½ | Gukesh Dommaraju |
| Jorden van Foreest | ½–½ | Thai Dai Van Nguyen |
| Arjun Erigaisi | 1–0 | R Praggnanandhaa |
Round 2 – 18 January 2026
| Yagiz Kaan Erdogmus (½) | ½–½ | Aravindh Chithambaram (½) |
| Vladimir Fedoseev (0) | 1–0 | Vincent Keymer (1) |
| Anish Giri (0) | ½–½ | Javokhir Sindarov (½) |
| Matthias Bluebaum (½) | ½–½ | Hans Niemann (1) |
| Gukesh Dommaraju (½) | ½–½ | Jorden van Foreest (½) |
| Thai Dai Van Nguyen (½) | ½–½ | Arjun Erigaisi (1) |
| Nodirbek Abdusattorov (½) | 1–0 | R Praggnanandhaa (0) |
Round 3 – 19 January 2026
| Arjun Erigaisi (1½) | ½–½ | Gukesh Dommaraju (1) |
| Aravindh Chithambaram (1) | ½–½ | Nodirbek Abdusattorov (1½) |
| Vincent Keymer (1) | 0–1 | Matthias Bluebaum (1) |
| Javokhir Sindarov (1) | ½–½ | Vladimir Fedoseev (1) |
| R Praggnanandhaa (0) | ½–½ | Thai Dai Van Nguyen (1) |
| Jorden van Foreest (1) | 1–0 | Anish Giri (½) |
| Hans Niemann (1½) | ½–½ | Yagiz Kaan Erdogmus (1) |
Round 4 – 20 January 2026
| Matthias Bluebaum (2) | 0–1 | Javokhir Sindarov (1½) |
| Aravindh Chithambaram (1½) | 0–1 | Hans Niemann (2) |
| Gukesh Dommaraju (1½) | ½–½ | R Praggnanandhaa (½) |
| Vladimir Fedoseev (1½) | ½–½ | Jorden van Foreest (2) |
| Anish Giri (½) | ½–½ | Arjun Erigaisi (2) |
| Yagiz Kaan Erdogmus (1½) | ½–½ | Vincent Keymer (1) |
| Nodirbek Abdusattorov (2) | 1–0 | Thai Dai Van Nguyen (1½) |
Round 5 – 21 January 2026
| Arjun Erigaisi (2½) | 0–1 | Vladimir Fedoseev (2) |
| Thai Dai Van Nguyen (1½) | 0–1 | Gukesh Dommaraju (2) |
| Javokhir Sindarov (2½) | 1–0 | Yagiz Kaan Erdogmus (2) |
| R Praggnanandhaa (1） | ½–½ | Anish Giri (1) |
| Jorden van Foreest (2½) | ½–½ | Matthias Bluebaum (2) |
| Vincent Keymer (1½) | 1–0 | Aravindh Chithambaram (1½) |
| Hans Niemann (3) | ½–½ | Nodirbek Abdusattorov (3) |
Round 6 – 23 January 2026
| Matthias Bluebaum (2½) | ½–½ | Arjun Erigaisi (2½) |
| Aravindh Chithambaram (1½) | ½–½ | Javokhir Sindarov (3½) |
| Yagiz Kaan Erdogmus (2) | 1–0 | Jorden van Foreest (3) |
| Anish Giri (1½) | ½–½ | Thai Dai Van Nguyen (1½) |
| Vladimir Fedoseev (3) | ½–½ | R Praggnanandhaa (1½) |
| Nodirbek Abdusattorov (3½) | 1–0 | Gukesh Dommaraju (3) |
| Hans Niemann (3½) | 0–1 | Vincent Keymer (2½) |
Round 7 – 24 January 2026
| Arjun Erigaisi (3) | 0–1 | Yagiz Kaan Erdogmus (3) |
| Thai Dai Van Nguyen (2) | ½–½ | Vladimir Fedoseev (3½) |
| Gukesh Dommaraju (3) | 0–1 | Anish Giri (2) |
| Javokhir Sindarov (4) | ½–½ | Hans Niemann (3½) |
| R Praggnanandhaa (2) | ½–½ | Matthias Bluebaum (3) |
| Jorden van Foreest (3) | 1–0 | Aravindh Chithambaram (2) |
| Vincent Keymer (3½) | 0–1 | Nodirbek Abdusattorov (4½) |

Round 8 – 25 January 2026
| Matthias Bluebaum (3½) | ½–½ | Thai Dai Van Nguyen (2½) |
| Aravindh Chithambaram (2) | ½–½ | Arjun Erigaisi (3) |
| Yagiz Kaan Erdogmus (4) | ½–½ | R Praggnanandhaa (2½) |
| Vincent Keymer (3½) | ½–½ | Javokhir Sindarov (4½) |
| Vladimir Fedoseev (4) | 0–1 | Gukesh Dommaraju (3) |
| Hans Niemann (4) | ½–½ | Jorden van Foreest (4) |
| Nodirbek Abdusattorov (5½) | 0–1 | Anish Giri (3) |
Round 9 – 27 January 2026
| Arjun Erigaisi (3½) | ½–½ | Hans Niemann (4½) |
| Thai Dai Van Nguyen (3) | 0–1 | Yagiz Kaan Erdogmus (4½) |
| Anish Giri (4) | ½–½ | Vladimir Fedoseev (4) |
| Gukesh Dommaraju (4) | 0–1 | Matthias Bluebaum (4) |
| Javokhir Sindarov (5) | ½–½ | Nodirbek Abdusattorov (5½) |
| R Praggnanandhaa (3) | 1–0 | Aravindh Chithambaram (2½) |
| Jorden van Foreest (4½) | 1–0 | Vincent Keymer (4) |
Round 10 – 28 January 2026
| Matthias Bluebaum (5) | 1–0 | Anish Giri (4½) |
| Aravindh Chithambaram (2½) | 1–0 | Thai Dai Van Nguyen (3) |
| Javokhir Sindarov (5½) | ½–½ | Jorden van Foreest (5½) |
| Yagiz Kaan Erdogmus (5½) | 0–1 | Gukesh Dommaraju (4) |
| Vincent Keymer (4) | 1–0 | Arjun Erigaisi (4) |
| Nodirbek Abdusattorov (6) | ½–½ | Vladimir Fedoseev (4½) |
| Hans Niemann (5) | ½–½ | R Praggnanandhaa (4) |
Round 11 – 30 January 2026
| Arjun Erigaisi (4) | 0–1 | Javokhir Sindarov (6) |
| Thai Dai Van Nguyen (3) | 0–1 | Hans Niemann (5½) |
| Gukesh Dommaraju (5) | ½–½ | Aravindh Chithambaram (3½) |
| R Praggnanandhaa (4½) | 0–1 | Vincent Keymer (5) |
| Anish Giri (4½) | 1–0 | Yagiz Kaan Erdogmus (5½) |
| Jorden van Foreest (6) | ½–½ | Nodirbek Abdusattorov (6½) |
| Vladimir Fedoseev (5) | ½–½ | Matthias Bluebaum (6) |
Round 12 – 31 January 2026
| Aravindh Chithambaram (4) | ½–½ | Anish Giri (5½) |
| Javokhir Sindarov (7) | ½–½ | R Praggnanandhaa (4½) |
| Yagiz Kaan Erdogmus (5½) | 1–0 | Vladimir Fedoseev (5½) |
| Jorden van Foreest (6½) | ½–½ | Arjun Erigaisi (4) |
| Hans Niemann (6½) | ½–½ | Gukesh Dommaraju (5½) |
| Nodirbek Abdusattorov (7) | 1–0 | Matthias Bluebaum (6½) |
| Vincent Keymer (6) | 1–0 | Thai Dai Van Nguyen (3) |
Round 13 – 1 February 2026
| Arjun Erigaisi (4½) | 0–1 | Nodirbek Abdusattorov (8) |
| Matthias Bluebaum (6½) | ½–½ | Yagiz Kaan Erdogmus (6½) |
| Thai Dai Van Nguyen (3) | 0–1 | Javokhir Sindarov (7½) |
| R Praggnanandhaa (5) | ½–½ | Jorden van Foreest (7) |
| Gukesh Dommaraju (6) | ½–½ | Vincent Keymer (7) |
| Anish Giri (6) | ½–½ | Hans Niemann (7) |
| Vladimir Fedoseev (5½) | 1–0 | Aravindh Chithambaram (4½) |

==== Points by round ====
This table shows the total number of wins minus the total number of losses each player has after each round. '=' indicates the player has won and lost the same number of games after that round. Green backgrounds indicate the player(s) with the highest score after each round. Red backgrounds indicate player(s) who could no longer win the tournament after each round. (Note: Players are marked in red if there is no permutation of remaining results that allows them to catch up the tournament leader(s) after remaining rounds.)

| Rank | Player | Rounds | | | | | | | | | | | | |
| Rank | Player | 1 | 2 | 3 | 4 | 5 | 6 | 7 | 8 | 9 | 10 | 11 | 12 | 13 |
|---|---|---|---|---|---|---|---|---|---|---|---|---|---|---|
| 1 | Nodirbek Abdusattorov (Uzbekistan) | = | +1 | +1 | +2 | +2 | +3 | +4 | +3 | +3 | +3 | +3 | +4 | +5 |
| 2 | Javokhir Sindarov (Uzbekistan) | = | = | = | +1 | +2 | +2 | +2 | +2 | +2 | +2 | +3 | +3 | +4 |
| 3 | Jorden van Foreest (Netherlands) | = | = | +1 | +1 | +1 | = | +1 | +1 | +2 | +2 | +2 | +2 | +2 |
| 4 | Hans Niemann (United States) | +1 | +1 | +1 | +2 | +2 | +1 | +1 | +1 | +1 | +1 | +2 | +2 | +2 |
| 5 | Vincent Keymer (Germany) | +1 | = | -1 | -1 | = | +1 | = | = | -1 | = | +1 | +2 | +2 |
| 6 | Matthias Blübaum (Germany) | = | = | +1 | = | = | = | = | = | +1 | +2 | +2 | +1 | +1 |
| 7 | Yağız Kaan Erdoğmuş (Turkey) | = | = | = | = | -1 | = | +1 | +1 | +2 | +1 | = | +1 | +1 |
| 8 | Anish Giri (Netherlands) | -1 | -1 | -2 | -2 | -2 | -2 | -1 | = | = | -1 | = | = | = |
| 9 | Vladimir Fedoseev (Slovenia) | -1 | = | = | = | +1 | +1 | +1 | = | = | = | = | -1 | = |
| 10 | Gukesh Dommaraju (India) | = | = | = | = | +1 | = | -1 | = | -1 | = | = | = | = |
| 11 | R Praggnanandhaa (India) | -1 | -2 | -2 | -2 | -2 | -2 | -2 | -2 | -1 | -1 | -2 | -2 | -2 |
| 12 | Aravindh Chithambaram (India) | = | = | = | -1 | -2 | -2 | -3 | -3 | -4 | -3 | -3 | -3 | -4 |
| 13 | Arjun Erigaisi (India) | +1 | +1 | +1 | +1 | = | = | -1 | -1 | -1 | -2 | -3 | -3 | -4 |
| 14 | Thai Dai Van Nguyen (Czechia) | = | = | = | -1 | -2 | -2 | -2 | -2 | -3 | -4 | -5 | -6 | -7 |

=== Challengers ===
Round 1 – 17 January 2026
| Velimir Ivic | ½–½ | Faustino Oro |
| Vasyl Ivanchuk | ½–½ | Carissa Yip |
| Erwin l'Ami | 0–1 | Aydin Suleymanli |
| Bibisara Assaubayeva | 1–0 | Andy Woodward |
| Eline Roebers | 0–1 | Vedant Panesar |
| Lu Miaoyi | 1–0 | Max Warmerdam |
| Marc'Andria Maurizzi | ½–½ | Daniil Yuffa |
Round 2 – 18 January 2026
| Carissa Yip (½) | 1–0 | Max Warmerdam (0) |
| Vedant Panesar (1) | 0–1 | Lu Miaoyi (1) |
| Faustino Oro (½) | 1–0 | Erwin l'Ami (0) |
| Andy Woodward (0) | 1–0 | Eline Roebers (0) |
| Daniil Yuffa (½) | ½–½ | Velimir Ivic (½) |
| Vasyl Ivanchuk (½) | ½–½ | Marc'Andria Maurizzi (½) |
| Aydin Suleymanli (1) | ½–½ | Bibisara Assaubayeva (1) |
Round 3 – 19 January 2026
| Bibisara Assaubayeva (1½) | ½–½ | Faustino Oro (1½) |
| Lu Miaoyi (2) | 0–1 | Andy Woodward (1) |
| Marc'Andria Maurizzi (1) | 1–0 | Carissa Yip (1½) |
| Velimir Ivic (1) | 0–1 | Vasyl Ivanchuk (1) |
| Erwin l'Ami (0) | 0–1 | Daniil Yuffa (1) |
| Max Warmerdam (0) | 1–0 | Vedant Panesar (1) |
| Eline Roebers (0) | 0–1 | Aydin Suleymanli (1½) |
Round 4 – 20 January 2026
| Marc'Andria Maurizzi (2) | 1–0 | Velimir Ivic (1) |
| Faustino Oro (2) | 1–0 | Eline Roebers (0) |
| Andy Woodward (2) | 1–0 | Max Warmerdam (1) |
| Carissa Yip (1½) | 1–0 | Vedant Panesar (1) |
| Daniil Yuffa (2) | ½–½ | Bibisara Assaubayeva (2) |
| Vasyl Ivanchuk (2) | 0–1 | Erwin l'Ami (0) |
| Aydin Suleymanli (2½) | 1–0 | Lu Miaoyi (2) |
Round 5 – 21 January 2026
| Bibisara Assaubayeva (2½) | ½–½ | Vasyl Ivanchuk (2) |
| Lu Miaoyi (2) | 0–1 | Faustino Oro (3) |
| Velimir Ivic (1) | 0–1 | Carissa Yip (2½) |
| Vedant Panesar (1) | 0–1 | Andy Woodward (3) |
| Erwin l'Ami (1) | ½–½ | Marc'Andria Maurizzi (3) |
| Max Warmerdam (1) | ½–½ | Aydin Suleymanli (3½) |
| Eline Roebers (0) | 1–0 | Daniil Yuffa (2½) |
Round 6 – 23 January 2026
| Faustino Oro (4) | 0–1 | Max Warmerdam (1½) |
| Marc'Andria Maurizzi (3½) | 1–0 | Bibisara Assaubayeva (3) |
| Velimir Ivic (1) | 1–0 | Erwin l'Ami (1½) |
| Carissa Yip (3½) | 0–1 | Andy Woodward (4) |
| Daniil Yuffa (2½) | 1–0 | Lu Miaoyi (2) |
| Vasyl Ivanchuk (2½) | 1–0 | Eline Roebers (1) |
| Aydin Suleymanli (4) | ½–½ | Vedant Panesar (1) |
Round 7 – 24 January 2026
| Bibisara Assaubayeva (3) | ½–½ | Velimir Ivic (2) |
| Max Warmerdam (2½) | ½–½ | Daniil Yuffa (3½) |
| Lu Miaoyi (2) | 0–1 | Vasyl Ivanchuk (3½) |
| Vedant Panesar (1½) | ½–½ | Faustino Oro (4) |
| Andy Woodward (5) | ½–½ | Aydin Suleymanli (4½) |
| Erwin l'Ami (1½) | ½–½ | Carissa Yip (3½) |
| Eline Roebers (1) | 0–1 | Marc'Andria Maurizzi (4½) |

Round 8 – 25 January 2026
| Marc'Andria Maurizzi (5½) | 1–0 | Lu Miaoyi (2) |
| Faustino Oro (4½) | 0–1 | Andy Woodward (5½) |
| Velimir Ivic (2½) | 1–0 | Eline Roebers (1) |
| Erwin l'Ami (2) | 0–1 | Bibisara Assaubayeva (3½) |
| Carissa Yip (4) | 0–1 | Aydin Suleymanli (5) |
| Daniil Yuffa (4) | ½–½ | Vedant Panesar (2) |
| Vasyl Ivanchuk (4½) | 1–0 | Max Warmerdam (3) |
Round 9 – 27 January 2026
| Bibisara Assaubayeva (4½) | ½–½ | Carissa Yip (4) |
| Max Warmerdam (3) | 1–0 | Marc'Andria Maurizzi (6½) |
| Andy Woodward (6½) | 1–0 | Daniil Yuffa (4½) |
| Lu Miaoyi (2) | 1–0 | Velimir Ivic (3½) |
| Vedant Panesar (2½) | ½–½ | Vasyl Ivanchuk (5½) |
| Eline Roebers (1) | 0–1 | Erwin l'Ami (2) |
| Aydin Suleymanli (6) | 1–0 | Faustino Oro (4½) |
Round 10 – 28 January 2026
| Marc'Andria Maurizzi (6½) | 1–0 | Vedant Panesar (3) |
| Bibisara Assaubayeva (5) | 1–0 | Eline Roebers (1) |
| Velimir Ivic (3½) | ½–½ | Max Warmerdam (3) |
| Erwin l'Ami (3) | 1–0 | Lu Miaoyi (3) |
| Carissa Yip (4½) | ½–½ | Faustino Oro (4½) |
| Daniil Yuffa (4½) | 0–1 | Aydin Suleymanli (7) |
| Vasyl Ivanchuk (6) | 1–0 | Andy Woodward (7½) |
Round 11 – 30 January 2026
| Faustino Oro (5) | 1–0 | Daniil Yuffa (4½) |
| Andy Woodward (7½) | 1–0 | Marc'Andria Maurizzi (7½) |
| Max Warmerdam (4½) | ½–½ | Erwin l'Ami (4) |
| Lu Miaoyi (3) | ½–½ | Bibisara Assaubayeva (6) |
| Vedant Panesar (3) | ½–½ | Velimir Ivic (4) |
| Eline Roebers (1) | 0–1 | Carissa Yip (5) |
| Aydin Suleymanli (8) | 0–1 | Vasyl Ivanchuk (7) |
Round 12 – 31 January 2026
| Bibisara Assaubayeva (6½) | 0–1 | Max Warmerdam (5) |
| Velimir Ivic (4½) | ½–½ | Andy Woodward (8½) |
| Marc'Andria Maurizzi (7½) | 0–1 | Aydin Suleymanli (8) |
| Erwin l'Ami (4½) | ½–½ | Vedant Panesar (3½) |
| Carissa Yip (6) | 0–1 | Daniil Yuffa (4½) |
| Vasyl Ivanchuk (8) | ½–½ | Faustino Oro (6) |
| Eline Roebers (1) | 1–0 | Lu Miaoyi (3½) |
Round 13 – 1 February 2026
| Faustino Oro (6½) | ½–½ | Marc'Andria Maurizzi (7½) |
| Andy Woodward (9) | 1–0 | Erwin l'Ami (5) |
| Max Warmerdam (6) | ½–½ | Eline Roebers (2) |
| Lu Miaoyi (3½) | 0–1 | Carissa Yip (6) |
| Daniil Yuffa (5½) | 0–1 | Vasyl Ivanchuk (8½) |
| Vedant Panesar (4) | 0–1 | Bibisara Assaubayeva (6½) |
| Aydin Suleymanli (9) | 0–1 | Velimir Ivic (5) |

==== Points by round ====
| Rank | Player | Rounds | | | | | | | | | | | | |
| Rank | Player | 1 | 2 | 3 | 4 | 5 | 6 | 7 | 8 | 9 | 10 | 11 | 12 | 13 |
|---|---|---|---|---|---|---|---|---|---|---|---|---|---|---|
| 1 | GM Andy Woodward (United States) | -1 | = | +1 | +2 | +3 | +4 | +4 | +5 | +6 | +5 | +6 | +6 | +7 |
| 2 | GM Vasily Ivanchuk (Ukraine) | = | = | +1 | = | = | +1 | +2 | +3 | +3 | +4 | +5 | +5 | +6 |
| 3 | GM Aydin Suleymanli (Azerbaijan) | +1 | +1 | +2 | +3 | +3 | +3 | +3 | +4 | +5 | +6 | +5 | +6 | +5 |
| 4 | GM Marc'Andria Maurizzi (France) | = | = | +1 | +2 | +2 | +3 | +4 | +5 | +4 | +5 | +4 | +3 | +3 |
| 5 | GM Bibisara Assaubayeva (Kazakhstan) | +1 | +1 | +1 | +1 | +1 | = | = | +1 | +1 | +2 | +2 | +1 | +2 |
| 6 | IM Faustino Oro (Argentina) | = | +1 | +1 | +2 | +3 | +2 | +2 | +1 | = | = | +1 | +1 | +1 |
| 7 | IM Carissa Yip (United States) | = | +1 | = | +1 | +2 | +1 | +1 | = | = | = | +1 | = | +1 |
| 8 | GM Max Warmerdam (Netherlands) | -1 | -2 | -1 | -2 | -2 | -1 | -1 | -2 | -1 | -1 | -1 | = | = |
| 9 | GM Velimir Ivić (Serbia) | = | = | -1 | -2 | -3 | -2 | -2 | -1 | -2 | -2 | -2 | -2 | -1 |
| 10 | GM Daniil Yuffa (Spain) | = | = | +1 | +1 | = | +1 | +1 | +1 | = | -1 | -2 | -1 | -2 |
| 11 | GM Erwin l'Ami (Netherlands) | -1 | -2 | -3 | -2 | -2 | -3 | -3 | -4 | -3 | -2 | -2 | -2 | -3 |
| 12 | FM Vedant Panesar (India) | +1 | = | -1 | -2 | -3 | -3 | -3 | -3 | -3 | -4 | -4 | -4 | -5 |
| 13 | IM Lu Miaoyi (China) | +1 | +2 | +1 | = | -1 | -2 | -3 | -4 | -3 | -4 | -4 | -5 | -6 |
| 14 | IM Eline Roebers (Netherlands) | -1 | -2 | -3 | -4 | -3 | -4 | -5 | -6 | -7 | -8 | -9 | -8 | -8 |
