= Zašová =

Municipality in the Czech Republic

- Municipality
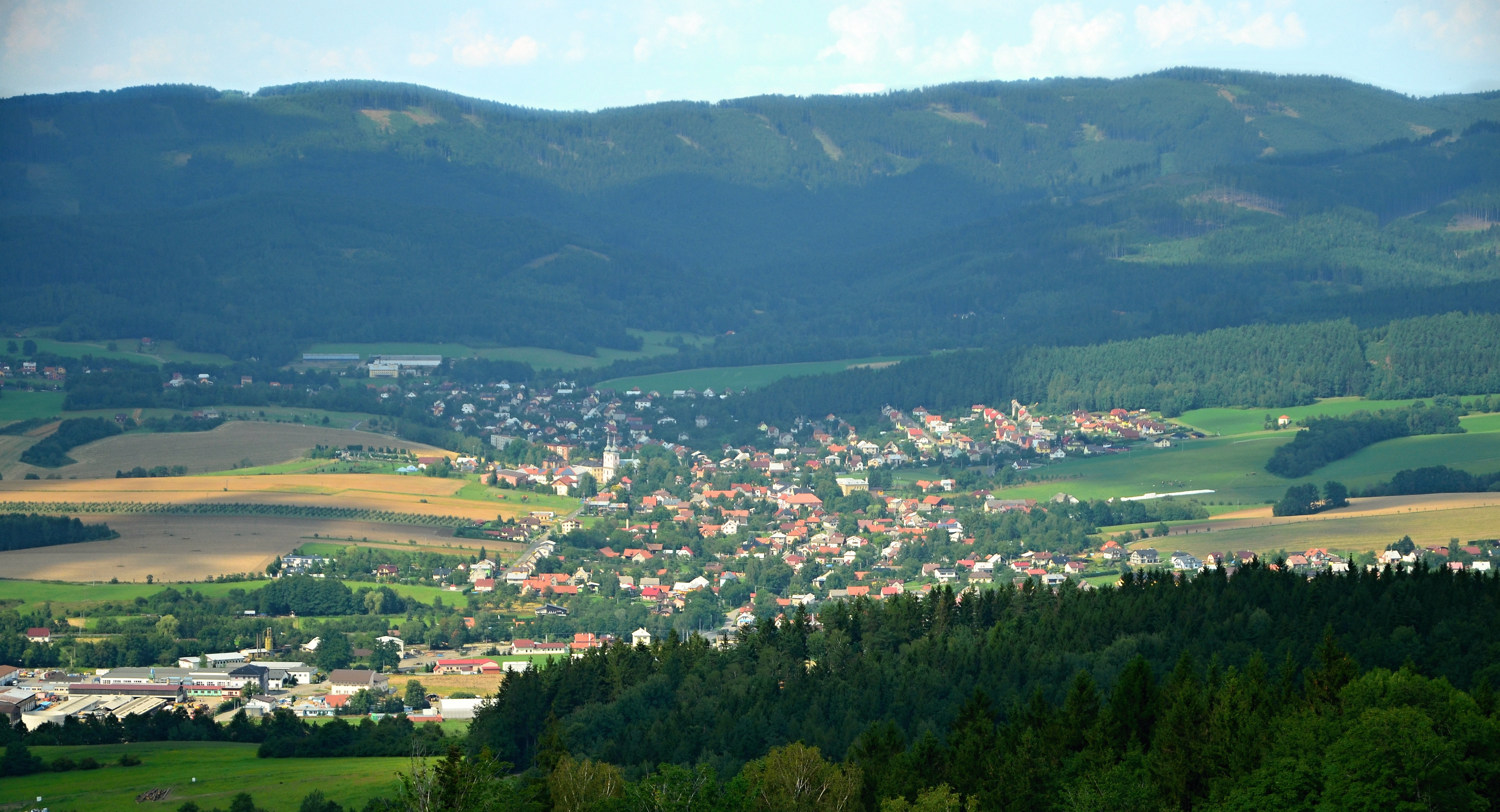
- View from the south

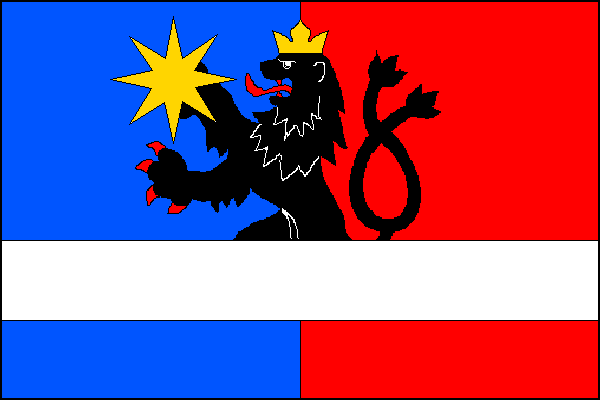
- Flag Coat of arms

- Location in the Czech Republic
- Coordinates: 49°28′27″N 18°2′40″E
- Country: Czech Republic
- Region: Zlín
- District: Vsetín
- First mentioned: 1370

Area
  - Total: 22.53 km^{2} (8.70 sq mi)
- Elevation: 338 m (1,109 ft)

Population (2026-01-01)
  - Total: 3,082
  - Density: 136.8/km^{2} (354.3/sq mi)
- Time zone: UTC+1 (CET)
  - Summer (DST): UTC+2 (CEST)
- Postal code: 756 51
- Website: www.zasova.cz

Zašová (Czech pronunciation: [ˈzaʃovaː]) is a municipality and village in Vsetín District in the Zlín Region of the Czech Republic. It has about 3,100 inhabitants.

== Administrative division ==
Zašová consists of two municipal parts (in brackets population according to the 2021 census):

- Zašová (2,445)
- Veselá (526)

== Geography ==
Zašová is located about 15 kilometres (9 mi) north of Vsetín and 39 km (24 mi) south of Ostrava. It extends into three natural regions: the central part of the municipal territory with the built-up area lies in the Rožnov Furrow valley, the northern part lies in the Moravian-Silesian Beskids mountain range, and the southern part lies in the Hostýn-Vsetín Mountains. The highest point is the Huštýn mountain at 748 m (2,454 ft) above sea level.

The brook Zašovský potok flows through the municipality and then joins the Rožnovská Bečva River, which crosses the municipality in the south.

== History ==
Zašová was founded in the 14th century. From 1549, the village was owned by the Zierotin family. In 1985, the municipality of Veselá was merged with Zašová.

== Demographics ==
Historical population

Year	Pop.	±%
1869	1,894	—
1880	1,950	+3.0%
1890	2,027	+3.9%
1900	2,222	+9.6%
1910	2,263	+1.8%

Year	Pop.	±%
1921	2,215	−2.1%
1930	2,543	+14.8%
1950	2,549	+0.2%
1961	2,688	+5.5%
1970	2,689	+0.0%

Year	Pop.	±%
1980	2,587	−3.8%
1991	2,645	+2.2%
2001	2,750	+4.0%
2011	2,913	+5.9%
2021	2,971	+2.0%

Source: Censuses

== Transport ==
The I/35 road (part of the European route E442) from Valašské Meziříčí to the Czech–Slovak border runs through the municipality.

Zašová is located on the railway line Rožnov pod Radhoštěm–Kojetín.

== Sights ==
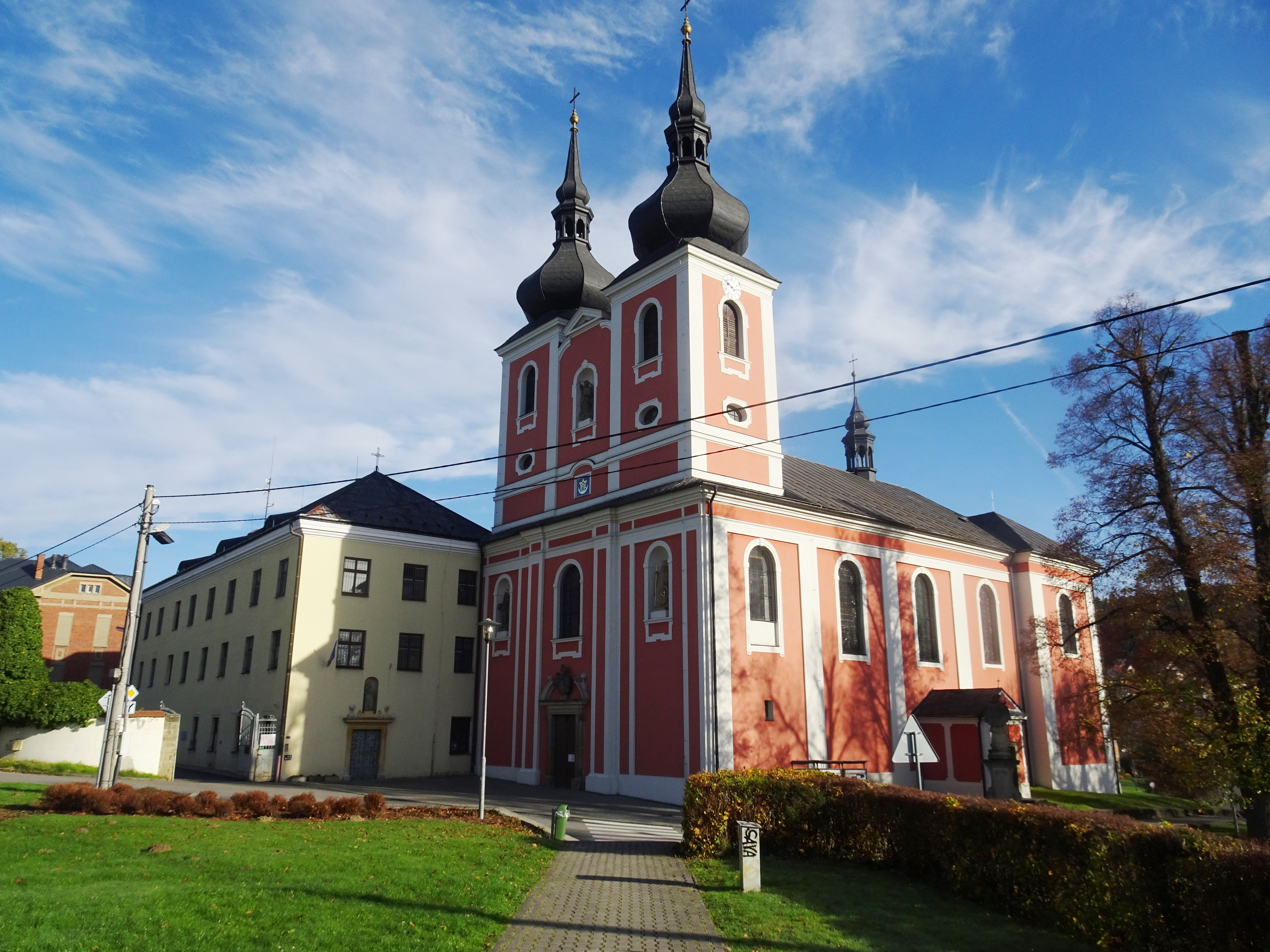
Church of the Visitation of Our Lady and the former monastery

The pilgrimage Church of the Visitation of Our Lady was built in the Baroque style in 1714 by the Zierotins, and thus replaced an old wooden church. Its most valuable decoration is the Gothic panel painting of the Madonna with Child on the Baroque main altar. It is a Marian image from the mid-15th century, associated with legends of miraculous healings and answered prayers. A former Trinitarian monastery is adjacent to the church. The monastery was founded in 1725, but was abolished in 1783 by the decree of Joseph II. Today, the premises of the former monastery are used as a social welfare institution.

== Twin towns – sister cities ==
Zašová is twinned with:

- Nová Ľubovňa, Slovakia

Zašová also cooperates with Veľký Meder and Vrútky in Slovakia.
