= Ján Markoš =

Slovak chess grandmaster (born 1985)

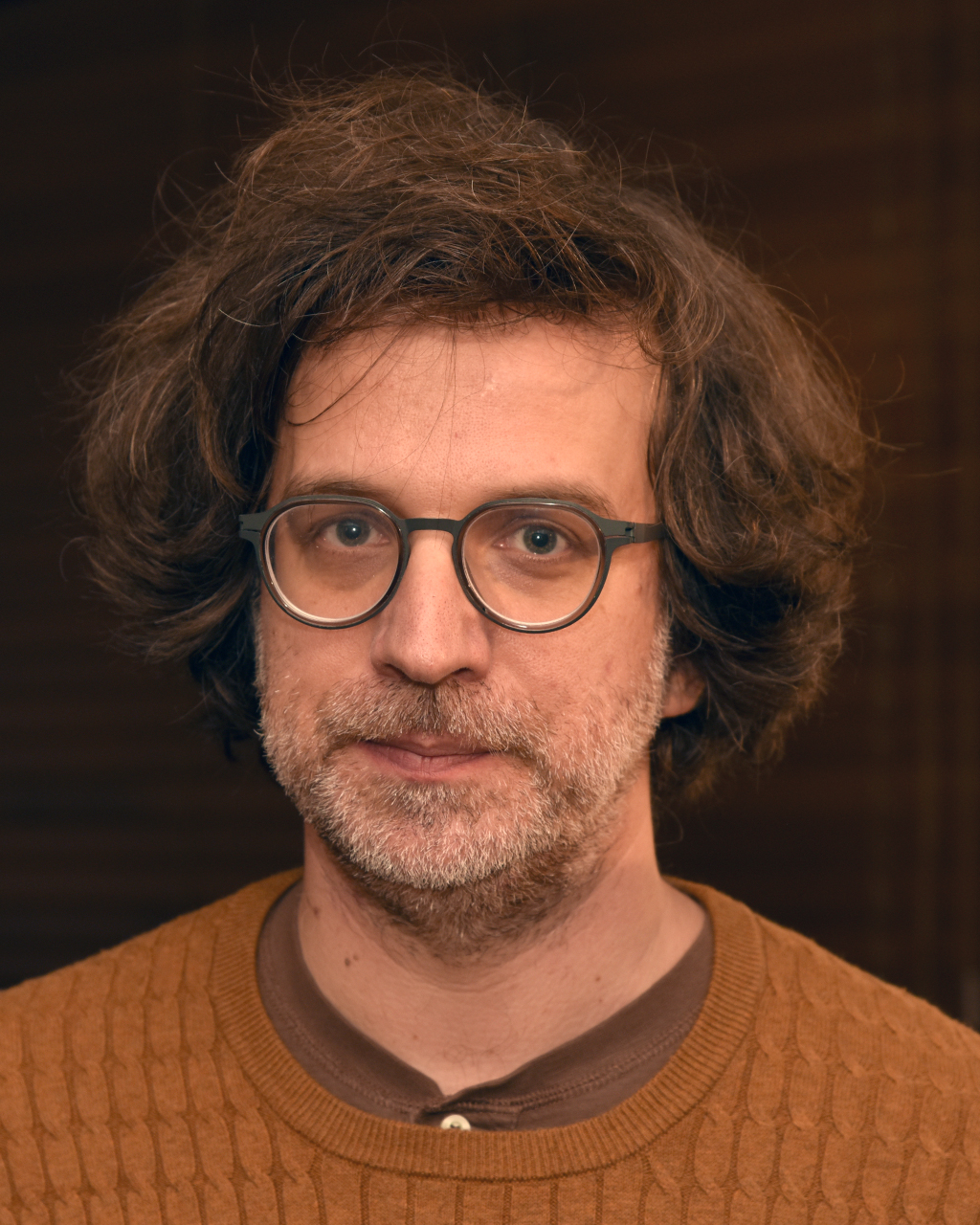

Personal information
- Born: July 2, 1985 (age 41) Banská Bystrica, Czechoslovakia

Chess career
- Country: Slovakia
- Title: Grandmaster (2007)
- FIDE rating: 2555 (July 2026)
- Peak rating: 2602 (July 2014)

Ján Markoš (born July 2, 1985) is a Slovak chess grandmaster and three-time national champion.

He is a regular contributor to the Moderný šach magazine, as well as the Novoborský šachový server and the ChessFriends.com News. He graduated in Philosophy and Evangelical theology in Prague.

== Career ==
Markoš learned to play chess from his sister at age six. He studied under the mentorship of Štefan Blaho, Róbert Tibenský, and Ľubomír Ftáčnik.

In 1997, Markoš became the Slovak champion in the under-12 category and subsequently in the U14 and U16. In 2000, he won the Under 16 section of the European Youth Chess Championships. In the same year, he also won for the first time the Slovak Chess Championship in Zvolen. Markoš won the Slovak championship again in 2011 and 2012. He was awarded the title of International Master in 2001. He finished second in the national championships of 2006, behind Tomáš Petrík, and in 2007, behind Sergei Movsesian.

In 2007, Markoš gained the Grandmaster title. In 2012 he won the 2nd Riga Technical University Open.

== Team competitions ==
He played for the Slovak national team at the Chess Olympiads of 2000, 2002, 2006, 2008, 2010 and 2014, at the European Team Chess Championship of 2001 in León, Spain, at the European Under-18 Team Chess Championship in 2000 and 2001, and at the Mitropa Cup of 2002, 2008 and 2014.

Markoš also plays in the Slovak Extraliga for Slovan Bratislava, the Czech Extraliga for Novoborský ŠK, the German Bundesliga for SF Berlin, in the Austrian Bundesliga for Lackenbach.

== Bibliography ==
- Markos, Jan (2008). Beat the KID!. Quality Chess. ISBN 978-1-906552-15-2.
- Markos, Jan (2018). Under the Surface. Quality Chess. ISBN 978-1-78483-049-6. - ECF 2018 Book of the Year
- Markoš, Ján; Navara, Dávid (2022). The Secret Ingredient: To Winning at Chess. Quality Chess. ISBN 9781784831424.
