= Zuzana Cibičková =

Slovak chess player (born 1988)

Zuzana Borošová
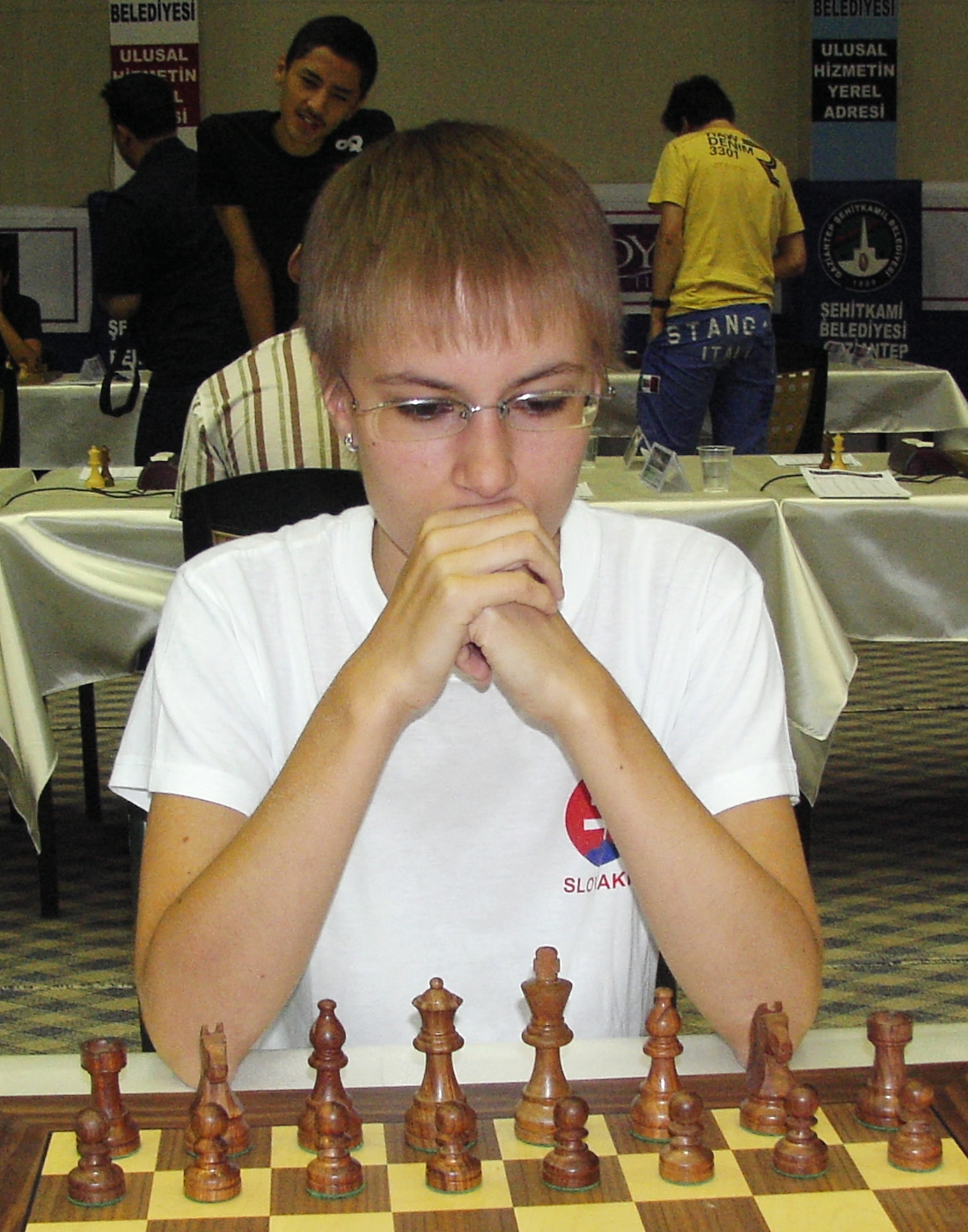
- Borošová in 2008

Personal information
- Born: 26 August 1988 (age 37) Komárno, Slovakia

Chess career
- Country: Slovakia
- Title: Woman Grandmaster (2011)
- FIDE rating: 2259 (November 2021)
- Peak rating: 2327 (April 2018)

Zuzana Borošová (born 26 August 1988), also known as Zuzana Cibičková, is a Slovak chess player who holds the FIDE title of Woman Grandmaster (WGM, 2011). She won the Slovak Women's Chess Championship in 2014.

== Biography ==
In the years 2006–2008, Borošová three times in a row won gold medals in the Slovak Junior Chess Championships in U20 girl's year group. In 2008, she won bronze medal in Slovak Women's Chess Championship. In 2014, Borošová won gold medal in Slovak Women's Chess Championship.

Borošová played for Slovakia in the Women's Chess Olympiads:

- In 2004, at first reserve board in the 36th Chess Olympiad (women) in Calvià (+4, =0, -2),
- In 2006, at first reserve board in the 37th Chess Olympiad (women) in Turin (+3, =3, -3),
- In 2012, at first board in the 40th Chess Olympiad (women) in Istanbul (+2, =6, -3),
- In 2018, at third board in the 43rd Chess Olympiad (women) in Batumi (+3, =4, -2).

She played for Slovakia in the European Girls' U18 Team Chess Championships:

- In 2004, at first board in the 5th European U18 Team Chess Championship (girls) in Belgrade (+2, =2, -2) and won team bronze medal,
- In 2006, at first board in the 6th European U18 Team Chess Championship (girls) in Balatonlelle (+4, =2, -1) and won team and individual bronze medals.

In 2008, Borošová was awarded the FIDE Woman International Master (WIM) title and in 2011 the Woman Grandmaster (WGM) title.
