= Peter Michalik =

Slovak chess grandmaster (born 1990)

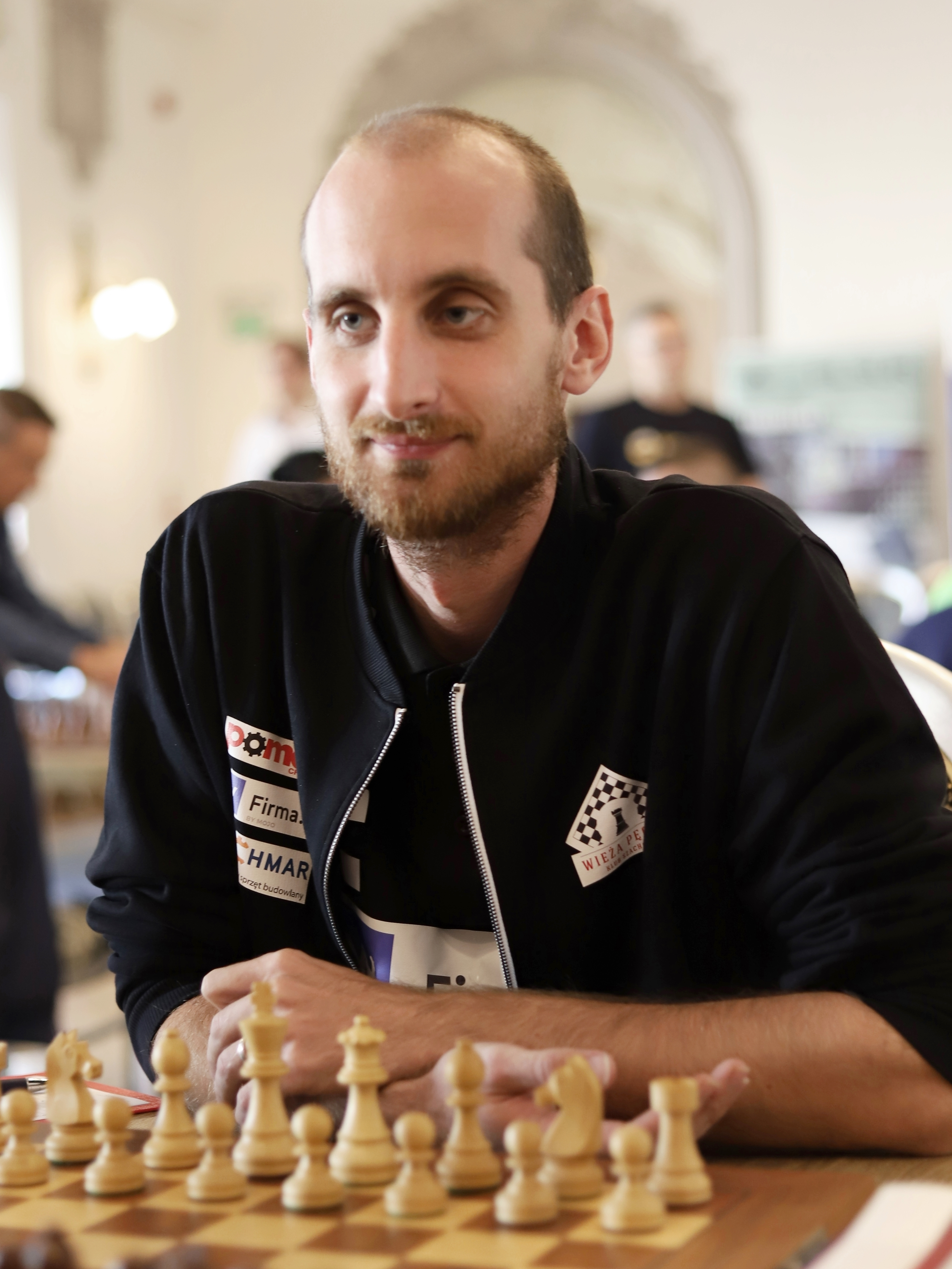
- Michalik in 2021

Personal information
- Born: September 15, 1990 (age 36) Prievidza, Czechoslovakia

Chess career
- Country: Slovakia (until 2016; since 2025); Czech Republic (2016–2025)
- Title: Grandmaster (2011)
- FIDE rating: 2543 (September 2026)
- Peak rating: 2605 (September 2020)

Peter Michalik is a Slovak chess grandmaster.

== Chess career ==
Michalik began playing chess at the age of 5. He played for the Croatia Bulldogs.

In June 2012, Michalik won the Individual Blitz Slovak Chess Championship with a perfect score of 17/17.

In December 2012, Michalik took an early lead in the Groningen Chess Tournament, but finished in joint 5th place.

In December 2017, Michalik finished joint second with Luke McShane behind winner Sergei Zhigalko in the European Blitz Chess Championship.

Michalik competed in the Chess World Cup 2023, where he was defeated by Ivan Ivanišević in the first round.
