= Martin Mrva =

Slovak chess grandmaster (born 1971)

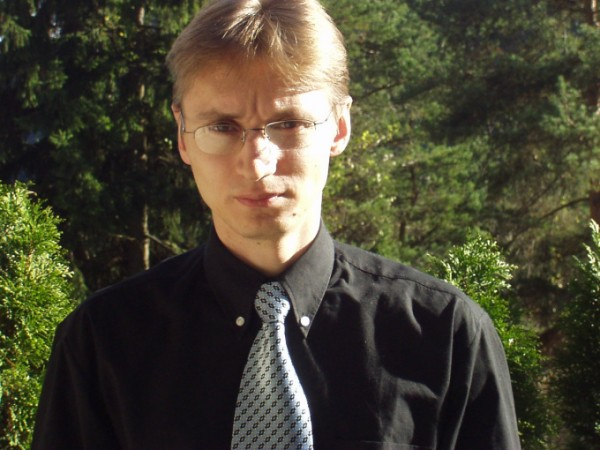

Personal information
- Born: 12 December 1971 (age 54) Prešov, Czechoslovakia
- Spouse: Alena Bekiarisová

Chess career
- Country: Slovakia
- Title: Grandmaster (2005)
- Peak rating: 2512 (April 2005)

Martin Mrva (born 12 December 1971) is a Slovak chess grandmaster. He achieved his highest Elo rating of 2512 in 2005.

He won the Slovakia Championship in 1989, he is the second vicechampion of students in 1992 in Odese, in zonal tournament in Budapešt 2000 took 5th place, he is winner of grandmaster tournaments in Budapešt 1993, Piešťany 2004. Grandmaster title achieved in 2005. He is author of CD Učim sa hrať šach (I learn to play chess) and publisher of portals c7c5.com and www.64.sk.

== Private life ==
Martin Mrva is married to a Slovak chess player, Woman International Master Alena Mrvová (née Bekiarisová).
