= Alena Mrvová =

Slovak chess player (born 1978)

Personal information
- Born: 22 February 1978 (age 48) Bardejov, Czechoslovakia
- Spouse: Martin Mrva

Chess career
- Country: Slovakia
- Title: Woman International Master (2010)
- Peak rating: 2298 (May 2010)

Alena Mrvová (née Bekiarisová; born 22 February 1978) is a Slovak chess Woman International Master (WIM, 2010). She is European Women's Team Chess Championship winner (1999).

== Biography ==
In 1993, Alena Mrvová won a silver medal in the Slovak Youth Chess Championship in the girl's age group U16. She has repeatedly represented Slovakia at the European Youth Chess Championships and the World Youth Chess Championships in various age groups, with the biggest success in 1996 in Rimavská Sobota when she won the bronze medal at the European Youth Chess Championships in the girl's U18 age group.

Alena Mrvová fulfilled the norm of a Woman International Master (WIM) at an Open Chess Tournament in the Tatras (2009) and at the European Women's Individual Chess Championship in Rijeka (2010).

Alena Mrvová played for Slovakia in the Women's Chess Olympiads:

- In 1996, at third board in the 32nd Chess Olympiad (women) in Yerevan (+2, =0, -4),
- In 1998, at first reserve board in the 33rd Chess Olympiad (women) in Elista (+3, =1, -4),
- In 2000, at third board in the 34th Chess Olympiad (women) in Istanbul (+4, =3, -3),
- In 2002, at third reserve board in the 35th Chess Olympiad (women) in Bled (+4, =1, -3),
- In 2010, at fourth board in the 39th Chess Olympiad (women) in Khanty-Mansiysk (+5, =2, -3),
- In 2012, at fourth board in the 40th Chess Olympiad (women) in Istanbul (+2, =2, -2).

Alena Mrvová played for Slovakia in the European Women's Team Chess Championship:

- In 1999, at reserve board in the 3rd European Team Chess Championship (women) in Batumi (+1, =1, -0) and won team gold medal.

== Personal life ==
Alena Mrvová is married to Slovak chess grandmaster Martin Mrva.
