= Igor Štohl =

Slovak chess grandmaster (born 1964)

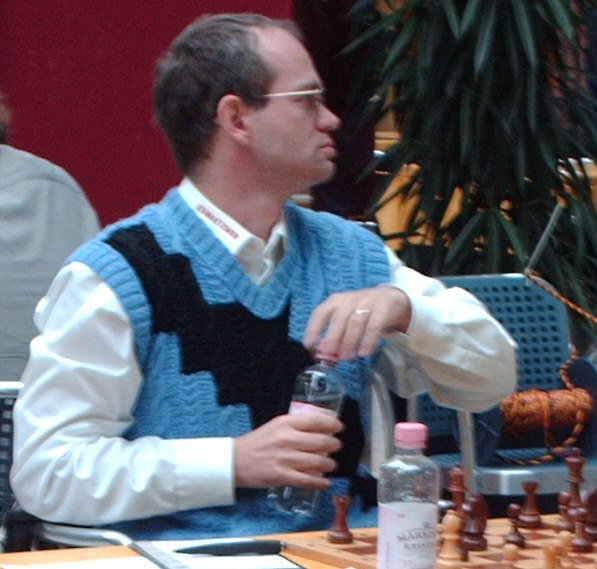
- Igor Štohl in 2006

Personal information
- Born: 27 September 1964 (age 61) Bratislava, Slovakia

Chess career
- Country: Czechoslovakia; Slovakia
- Title: Grandmaster (1992)
- Peak rating: 2600 (July 1999)
- Peak ranking: No. 82 (July 1999)

Igor Štohl (born 27 September 1964) is a Slovak chess player who holds the titles of Grandmaster and Slovak Chess Championship winner (1984).

== Biography ==
Igor Štohl learned to play chess at the age of 10. In 1982, in Copenhagen he won silver medal in World Junior Chess Championship after winner Andrei Sokolov. Two years later Igor Štohl won Slovak Chess Championship. In 1990 in Manila he participated in the World Chess Championship Interzonal Tournament where he was ranked in 23rd place.

Igor Štohl is winner of many international chess tournaments, including winning or sharing first place in Trnava (1983), Starý Smokovec (1986, 1988), Hradec Králové (1988), Vrnjačka Banja (1989), Dortmund Sparkassen Chess Meeting (1991), Paul Keres Memorial Tournament (Vancouver, 1993), Vinkovci (1995), Stavanger (1998).

Igor Štohl played for Czechoslovakia and Slovakia in the Chess Olympiads:

- In 1990, at third board in the 29th Chess Olympiad in Novi Sad (+4, =7, -1),
- In 1992, at second board in the 30th Chess Olympiad in Manila (+4, =8, -1),
- In 1994, at second board in the 31st Chess Olympiad in Moscow (+5, =8, -1),
- In 2000, at second board in the 34th Chess Olympiad in Istanbul (+2, =8, -3),
- In 2006, at second board in the 37th Chess Olympiad in Turin (+0, =4, -2).

Igor Štohl played for Czechoslovakia and Slovakia in the European Team Chess Championships:

- In 1989, at fourth board in the 9th European Team Chess Championship in Haifa (+3, =3, -1),
- In 1997, at second board in the 11th European Team Chess Championship in Pula (+3, =3, -2),
- In 1999, at first board in the 12th European Team Chess Championship in Batumi (+3, =4, -2),
- In 2001, at second board in the 13th European Team Chess Championship in León (+0, =7, -1).

In 1983, he was awarded the FIDE International Master (IM) title and in 1992 received the FIDE Grandmaster (GM) title.

Igor Štohl is a regular collaborator of ChessBase. He took, among others participation in the development of the monograph about Emanuel Lasker. Igor Štohl also published several chess books, including two dedicated to Garry Kasparov chess career.
