= Nová Ľubovňa =

- Municipality
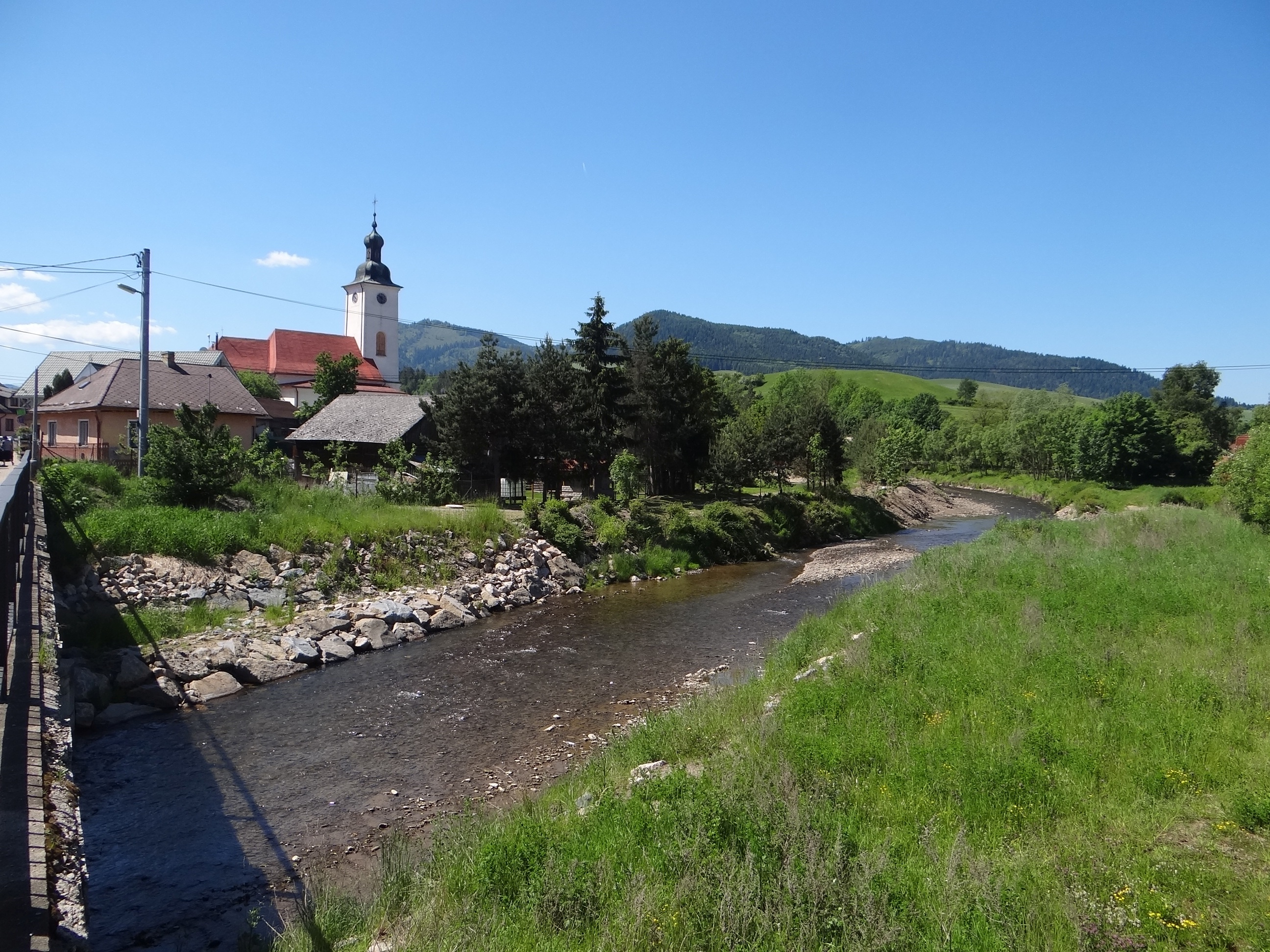

- Flag

- Location of Nová Ľubovňa in the Prešov Region Location of Nová Ľubovňa in Slovakia
- Coordinates: 49.27°N 20.68°E
- Country: Slovakia
- Region: Prešov Region
- District: Stará Ľubovňa District
- First mentioned: 1322

Area
  - Total: 14.49 km^{2} (5.59 sq mi)
- Elevation: 557 m (1,827 ft)

Population (2025)
  - Total: 3,009
- Time zone: UTC+1 (CET)
  - Summer (DST): UTC+2 (CEST)
- Postal code: 651 1
- Area code: +421 52
- Vehicle registration plate (until 2022): SL
- Website: www.novalubovna.sk

Nová Ľubovňa (Hungarian: Újlubló, German: Neulublau, Rusyn: Нова Любовня) is a village and municipality in Stará Ľubovňa District in the Prešov Region of northern Slovakia.

== History ==
In historical records the village was first mentioned in 1308. Before the establishment of independent Czechoslovakia in 1918, Nová Ľubovňa was part of Szepes County within the Kingdom of Hungary. From 1939 to 1945, it was part of the Slovak Republic. On 24 January 1945, the Red Army dislodged the Wehrmacht from Nová Ľubovňa and it was once again part of Czechoslovakia.

== Geography ==
The municipality lies at an altitude of 557 metres (1,827 ft) and covers an area of 14.49 km^{2} (5.59 sq mi) (2025).

== Population ==
Population statistic (10 years)
| Year | 1995 | 2005 | 2015 | 2025 |
|---|---|---|---|---|
| Count | 2442 | 2762 | 2988 | 3009 |
| Difference | | +13.10% | +8.18% | +0.70% |

Population statistic
| Year | 2024 | 2025 |
|---|---|---|
| Count | 3032 | 3009 |
| Difference | | −0.75% |

It has a population of 3009 people (31 December 2025).

=== Ethnicity ===
Census 2021 (1+ %)
| Ethnicity | Number | Fraction |
|---|---|---|
| Slovak | 2938 | 97.64% |
| Not found out | 584 | 19.4% |
| Rusyn | 119 | 3.95% |
| Total | 3009 | |

In year 2021 was 3009 people by ethnicity 2938 as Slovak, 584 as Not found out, 119 as Rusyn, 25 as Romani, 18 as Polish, 16 as Other, 9 as German, 7 as Czech, 4 as Ukrainian, 3 as Russian, 2 as Italian, 1 as Irish, 1 as Romanian, 1 as Moravian, 1 as Hungarian, 1 as Canadian and 1 as Greek.

Note on population: The difference values of population numbers in the table "Population statistic" and in the sections "Ethnicity" & "Religion" is caused by the use of various statistical methods.

=== Religion ===
Census 2021 (1+ %)
| Religion | Number | Fraction |
|---|---|---|
| Roman Catholic Church | 2531 | 84.11% |
| Greek Catholic Church | 269 | 8.94% |
| None | 134 | 4.45% |
| Not found out | 34 | 1.13% |
| Total | 3009 | |

In year 2021 was 3009 people by religion 2531 from Roman Catholic Church, 269 from Greek Catholic Church, 134 from None, 34 from Not found out, 11 from Eastern Orthodox Church, 6 from Other, 6 from Buddhism, 5 from Evangelical Church, 3 from Paganism and natural spirituality, 3 from Other and not ascertained christian church, 3 from Jehovah's Witnesses, 2 from Christian Congregations in Slovakia, 1 from Seventh-day Adventist Church and 1 from Ad hoc movements.

== Twin towns – sister cities ==
Nová Ľubovňa is twinned with:

- Zašová, Czech Republic
