= Viktor Gažík =

Slovak chess grandmaster (born 2001)

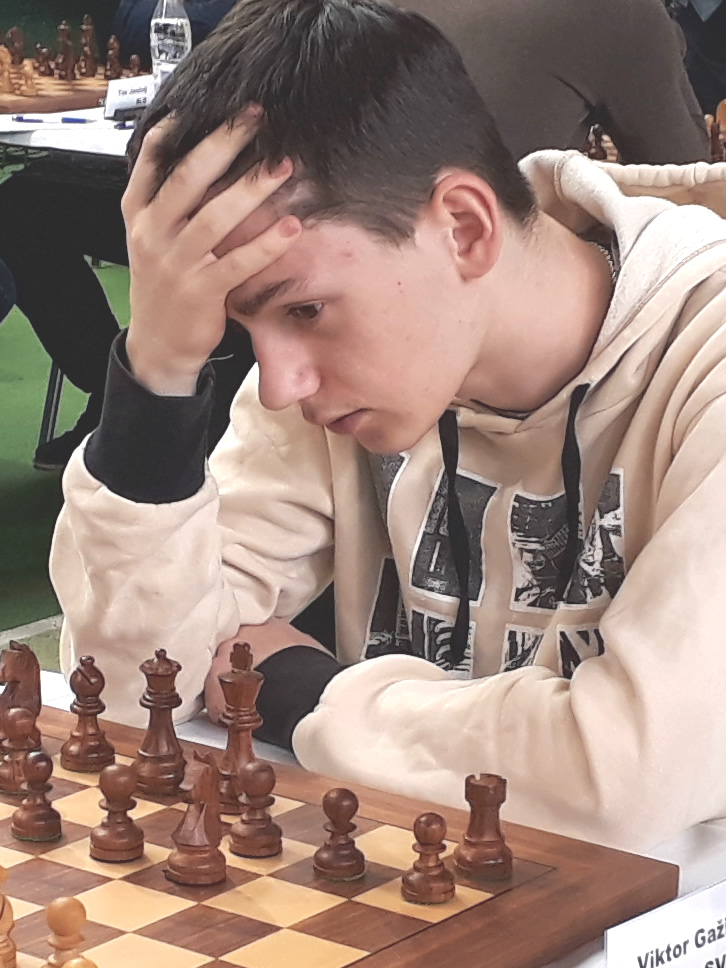
- Mitropa Cup 2019

Personal information
- Born: 13 December 2001 (age 24) Handlová, Slovakia

Chess career
- Country: Slovakia
- Title: Grandmaster (2022)
- FIDE rating: 2544 (July 2026)
- Peak rating: 2585 (February 2024)

Viktor Gažík (born 13 December 2001) is a Slovak chess grandmaster.

== Biography ==
Viktor Gažík is multiple winner of Slovak Youth Chess Championships in different age groups. He played for Slovakia in European Youth Chess Championships and World Youth Chess Championships in the different age groups and best results reached in 2010 in Batumi, when he won European Youth Chess Championship in the U10 age group and in 2018 in Chalkidiki, when he won World Youth Chess Championship in the U18 age group.

Viktor Gažík won the Slovakia International Chess Tournament Prievidza (2015) and Chess Masters Pieniny (2017).

In 2016, he was awarded the FIDE International Master (IM) title. In 2022, he was awarded the Grandmaster (GM) title by FIDE.
