= Ján Plachetka =

Slovak chess grandmaster (1945–2026)

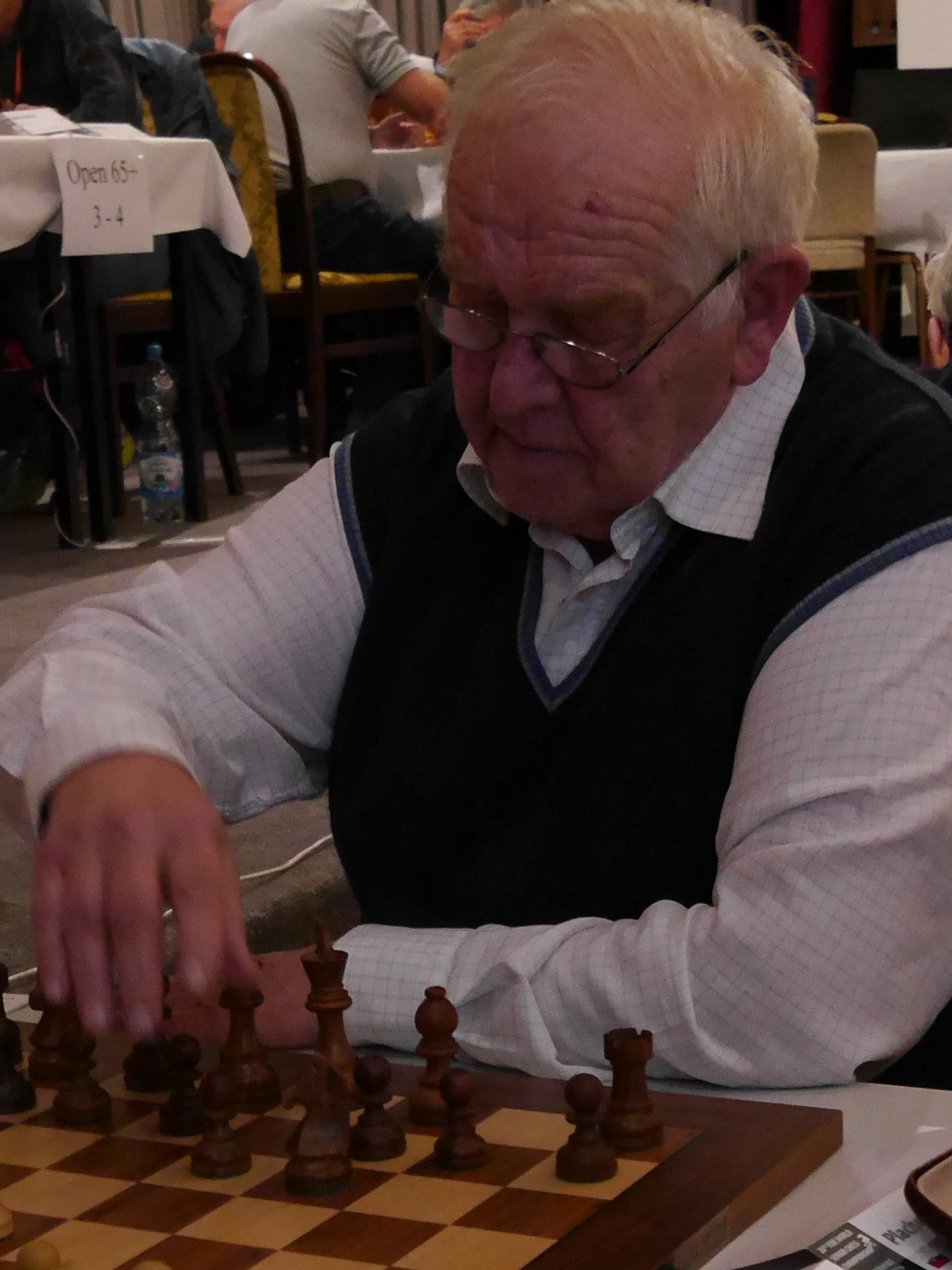
- Plachetka in 2016

Personal information
- Born: 18 February 1945 Trenčín, Slovak Republic
- Died: 24 May 2026 (aged 81)

Chess career
- Country: Czechoslovakia; Slovakia
- Title: Grandmaster (1978)
- Peak rating: 2480 (January 1980)

Ján Plachetka (18 February 1945 – 24 May 2026) was a Slovak chess Grandmaster.

Plachetka was awarded the GM title in 1978. He shared the first place at Polanica-Zdrój 1975, was first at Sofia 1979, first at Trnava 1979, and shared the first place at Strasbourg 1985. He was also a member of the Czechoslovak Chess Olympiad teams from 1980 to 1986. As a senior, Plachetka participated in chess tournaments including playing for the Slovak Senior Team. Plachetka died on 24 May 2026, at the age of 81.

Plachetka was the first Slovak player to be awarded the FIDE Grandmaster title (the nationality of Richard Réti, born in Pezinok in present-day Slovakia, is disputed).
