= Daniel Hausrath =

German chess grandmaster (born 1976)

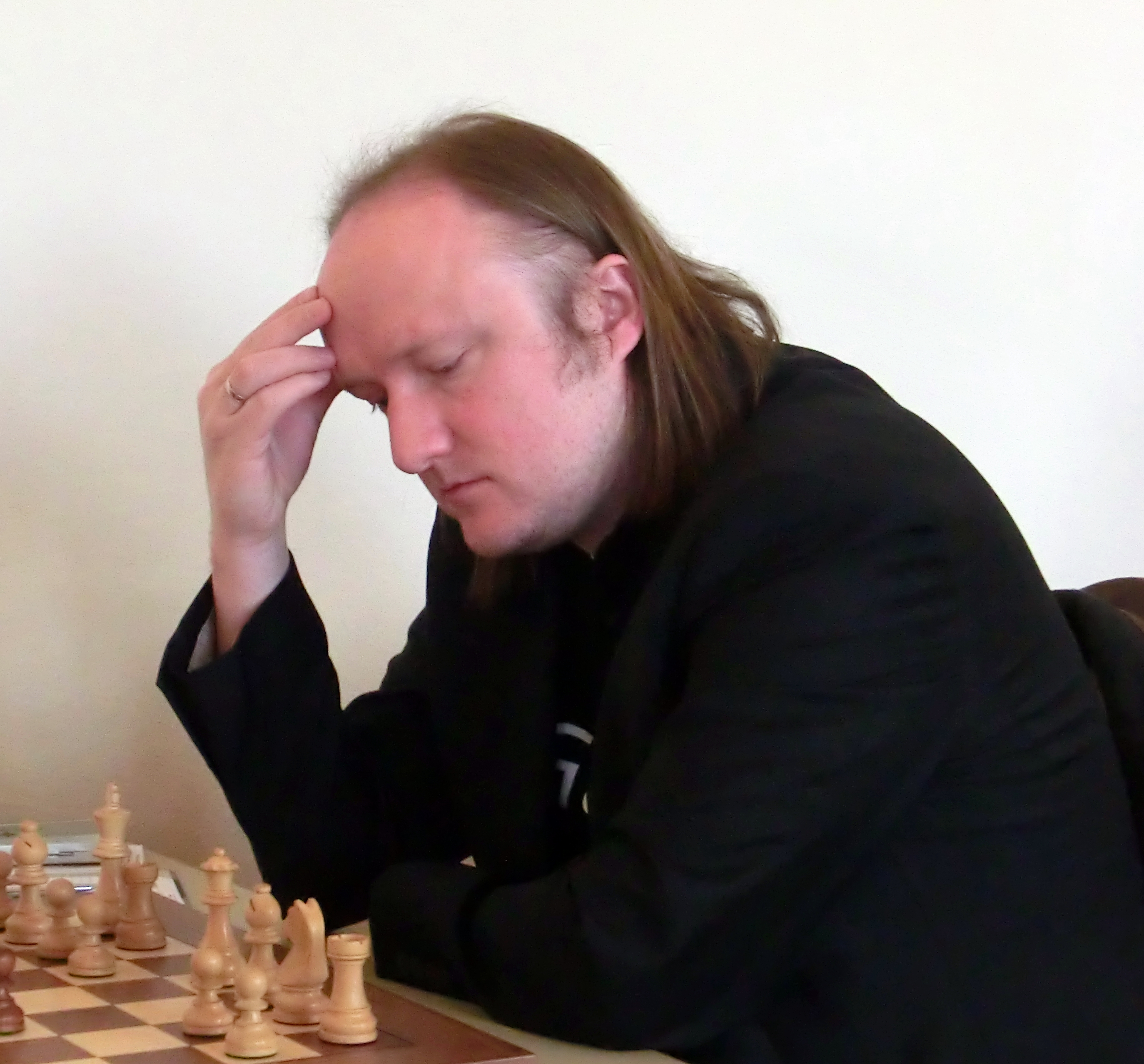
- Hausrath in 2013

Personal information
- Born: April 8, 1976 (age 50) Mülheim, Germany

Chess career
- Country: Germany
- Title: Grandmaster (2013)
- FIDE rating: 2456 (July 2026)
- Peak rating: 2540 (November 2010)

Daniel Hausrath is a German chess grandmaster.

== Chess career ==
He was awarded the Grandmaster title in 2013, after achieving his norms at the:

- Deutsche Bundesliga in April 2006
- Schachfestival Biel MTO in July 2009
- Schachfestival Biel Open Masters in August 2013

In August 2024, he tied for second place with ten other players in the HZ University of Applied Sciences Chess Tournament, ultimately being ranked in 6th place after tiebreak scores.

In August 2025, he was tied for first place after the fifth round of the Zeeland Open. He ultimately finished with 6.5/9.
