= Vladimir Gurevich =

Ukrainian-German chess grandmaster (born 1959)

- Vladimir Gurevich in 2009

Personal information
- Born: 4 August 1959 (age 67) Luhansk, Ukrainian SSR, Soviet Union

Chess career
- Country: Soviet Union (until 1992); Ukraine (1992–2025); Germany (since 2025)
- Title: Grandmaster (1998)
- FIDE rating: 2442 (November 2026)
- Peak rating: 2520 (July 1999)

Vladimir Yakovych Gurevich (Ukrainian: Володимир Гуревич, romanized: Volodymyr Hurevych; born 4 August 1959) is a Ukrainian-German chess Grandmaster (1998). He has represented Germany since 2025.

== Chess career ==
In 2020, Gurevich competed in the 2. Bundesliga Süd (South), scoring 4 points. He returned to the competition in 2022, finishing with 3 points, and scored 4 points in the 2023 edition.

He achieved his highest FIDE rating of 2,492 on 1 December 2013.
