= Igor Berdichevski =

Russian chess grandmaster, author, and FIDE Trainer

Personal information
- Born: July 15, 1964 (age 61) Moscow, Soviet Union

Chess career
- Country: Russia
- Title: Grandmaster (1996)
- FIDE rating: 2555 (July 2026)
- Peak rating: 2555 (May 2022)

Igor Berdichevski (born July 15, 1964, in Moscow, Soviet Union) is a Russian chess grandmaster, author, and FIDE Trainer. He received the grandmaster title in 1996. Berdichevski retired from international chess play in 2002. He is the author of an encyclopedia on Jewish chess players, Modern Practice 1 Nc6 (1998), and World Chess Championship Matches (2002).

== Notable tournaments ==
Tournament Name	Year	ELO	Points
Ilyumzhinov Cup	2006	2555	5.5
Moscow CCC-ch	1991	2340	2.0
Moscow op	1990	2340	5.0
