= Daniel Forcén Esteban =

Spanish chess grandmaster (born 1994)

Personal information
- Born: June 12, 1994 (age 32) Zaragoza, Spain

Chess career
- Country: Spain
- Title: Grandmaster (2016)
- FIDE rating: 2541 (July 2026)
- Peak rating: 2580 (August 2022)

Daniel Forcén Esteban is a Spanish chess grandmaster.

== Chess career ==
He achieved the Grandmaster title in 2016, after earning his norms at the:

- IV Open International St Casablanca in December 2010
- Winterchess Mallorca Masters Marzo in March 2013
- XXXV Open International Villa de Benasque in July 2015

In May 2018, he finished in second place in the Villa de Estadilla International Chess Open, half a point behind winner Sergio Garza.

In July 2025, he finished with 7.5/10 in the Open Internacional "Villa de Benasque", during which he held a draw against the higher-rated Daniele Vocaturo.
