= Nikolozi Kacharava =

Georgian chess grandmaster (born 2004)

Personal information
- Born: March 3, 2004 (age 22) Tbilisi, Georgia

Chess career
- Country: Georgia
- Title: Grandmaster (2023)
- FIDE rating: 2525 (September 2026)
- Peak rating: 2550 (April 2023)

Nikolozi Kacharava is a Georgian chess grandmaster.

== Chess career ==
In October 2022, he won the bronze medal in the World Junior Chess Championship, after tying with four other players for first place.

He was awarded the Grandmaster title in 2023, after achieving his norms at the:

- European Individual Championship in September 2021
- World Junior B-20 Championship in October 2022
- European Individual Championship in March 2023

In February 2024, he finished in second place in the Georgian Chess Championship with a score of 5.5/9, beating defending champion Mikheil Mchedlishvili on tiebreak scores.
