= Kevel Oliva Castañeda =

Cuban chess grandmaster (born 1994)

Personal information
- Born: May 4, 1994 (age 32) Matanzas, Cuba

Chess career
- Country: Cuba
- Title: Grandmaster (2017)
- FIDE rating: 2459 (July 2026)
- Peak rating: 2516 (June 2018)

Kevel Oliva Castañeda is a Cuban chess grandmaster.

== Chess career ==
In July 2014, he played in the Barbera del Valles, where he tied for fourth place and earned his final IM norm.

In August 2014, he played in the Badalona Open, where he finished 9th. Previously, he had achieved IM norms in all five tournaments he played in the Catalan circuit, a GM norm in Sant Marti, and winning the Sitges Open.
