= Sapar Batyrov =

Turkmenistan chess player

Personal information
- Born: November 29, 1967 (age 58)

Chess career
- Country: Turkmenistan
- Title: Grandmaster (1998)
- Peak rating: 2409 (June 2018)

Sapar Batyrov (born November 29, 1967, Turkmenistan) is a chess grandmaster (GM) from Turkmenistan. He received the grandmaster title in 1998.

== Notable tournaments ==
| Tournament Name | Year | ELO | Points |
|---|---|---|---|
| Schleusen IM 4th (Datteln) | 2002 | 2456 | 6.0 |
| Ashkhabad (Ashkhabad) | 1996 | 2360 | 10.0 |
