= Toni Najdoski =

Macedonian chess grandmaster (born 1970)

Personal information
- Born: 4 May 1970 (age 56)

Chess career
- Country: Yugoslavia → North Macedonia
- Title: Grandmaster (1998)
- FIDE rating: 2598 (July 2026)
- Peak rating: 2601 (January 2001)
- Peak ranking: No. 90 (January 2002)

Toni Najdoski (born 4 May 1970) is a Macedonian chess grandmaster. He became a Grandmaster in 1998.
