= Luis Lázaro Agüero Jiménez =

Cuban chess grandmaster (born 1991)

Personal information
- Born: January 5, 1991 (age 35) Havana, Cuba

Chess career
- Country: Cuba
- Title: Grandmaster (2019)
- FIDE rating: 2472 (July 2026)
- Peak rating: 2508 (May 2019)

Luis Lázaro Agüero Jiménez (born 1991) is a Cuban international chess Grandmaster titled in 2019.
