= Orazly Annageldyev =

Turkmenistan chess grandmaster (born 1960)

Personal information
- Born: March 20, 1960 (age 66)

Chess career
- Country: Turkmenistan
- Title: Grandmaster (2005)
- Peak rating: 2490 (July 1996)

Orazly Annageldyev (born 1960) is a Chess Grandmaster from Turkmenistan.
