= Arseny Alavkin =

Russian chess grandmaster

Personal information
- Born: January 17, 1969 (age 57)

Chess career
- Country: Russia
- Title: Grandmaster (2010)
- Peak rating: 2507 (July 2005)

Arseny Alavkin (born 1969) is a Russian Chess Grandmaster titled in 2010.
