= Chinese Chess Association =

Governing body of chess in China

- 中国国际象棋协会
- Abbreviation: CCA
- Formation: 1962 (gained independence in 1986)
- Headquarters: Beijing, China
- Region served: Mainland China
- Members: 300,000
- President: Jiangchuan Ye
- Vice President: Yuhua Xu
- General Secretary: Hongwei Tian
- Parent organization: Zhongguo Qiyuan
- Affiliations: FIDE, Asian Chess Federation
- Website: http://cca.imsa.cn/

The Chinese Chess Association (CCA) (中国国际象棋协会) is the governing body of chess in China, one of the federations of FIDE, and a member of the Asian Chess Federation (ACF). It is the principal authority over all chess events in China, including the China Chess League (CCL). Founded in 1986, the CCA is headquartered in Beijing.

== History ==
Due to its unpopularity in the country the game of chess was first affiliated to the Chinese Xiangqi Association when it was established in November 1962. With the achievements made by Chinese chess players in major world tournaments and the increasing popularity of the game in China, the Chinese Chess Association was formed in 1986, with Hong Lin as the president. Former women's world champion Xie Jun was appointed president in 2019.

== Role ==
CCA is a member of the National Olympic Committee and officially joined FIDE in 1975. Its aims are to promote and popularize the game of chess and general organization of the chess sport in China, represent the country on the international stage, coordinate the activities of clubs and regional associations as well as organization of individual and team tournaments and championships (in different age categories). It promotes the participation of the game in schools.

The CCA selects and finances the Chinese national team for the biannual Chess Olympiad, World Team Chess Championships (every 4 years), Asian Team Chess Championships, Asian Chess Games, Asian Indoor Games, national chess summits, and it also funds players' training and for them to participate in individual tournaments.

=== National team ===
Following is a name list of the national chess team setup:

- Team manager: Lin Feng
- Deputy team manager: Li Wenliang
- Head coach: Ye Jiangchuan
- Deputy head coach: Zhang Weida
- Coaches: Xu Jun, Yin Hao, Yu Shaoteng
- Players:

Men's team

- Ding Liren
- Yu Yangyi
- Wei Yi
- Bu Xiangzhi
- Ni Hua
- Wang Yue
- Wang Hao
- Li Chao
- Lu Shanglei
- Bai Jinshi
- Zhou Jianchao
- Wen Yang
- Xu Xiangyu

Women's team

- Hou Yifan
- Ju Wenjun
- Tan Zhongyi
- Lei Tingjie
- Zhao Xue
- Shen Yang
- Huang Qian
- Guo Qi
- Ding Yixin
- Zhai Mo

== Commissions ==
- Judges Commission
- Press & Publicity Commission
- Technical Training Commission
- Junior Working Commission
- Promotion & Development Commission
- Qualification Appraisal Commission
- Women Working Commission
- External Affairs Commission

== Funding ==
Officials of the Chinese Chess Association are appointed by the National Sports Committee which also provides funding.

The Chinese Chess Association, in 1993, received an endowment fund from Singapore businessman Mr. Lee Seng Tee who donated about US$1.5 million. Ten percent of this donation was for the establishment of the Chess library in China QiYuan. The remaining 90% were deposited in a fixed account from which the Chinese Chess Association drew interest mainly for its administrative operations and to send players for overseas competitions. In 1997, the Chinese Chess Association founded a computer firm to fund its other activities on an annual basis.

== See also ==
- Geography of chess
- Chess in China
- Chinese Chess Championship, national championship
- Zhongguo Qiyuan, an official national super-agency responsible for board games and card games
