= Chess in China =

Overview of China's participation in professional chess

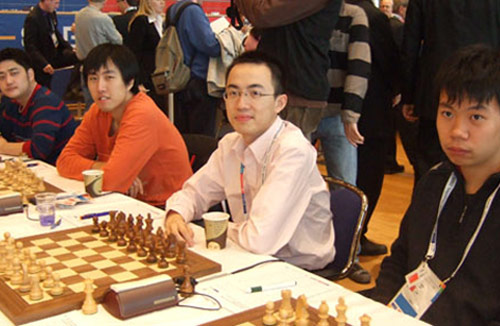
China's 2008 Olympiad Team: left to right, Wang Yue, Bu Xiangzhi, Ni Hua, Wang Hao

China is a major chess power, with the women's team winning gold medals at the Olympiad in 1998, 2000, 2002, 2004, 2016, 2018, 2026; silver medals in 1996, 2010, 2012, and 2014; bronze medals in 1990, 1992, 1994, 2006. The Open team won gold at the 2014 and 2018 Olympiads, and silver at 2006. The average rating for the country's top ten players is 2666, which is third in the FIDE rankings as of May 2026.

Chinese progress has been underpinned by large government support and testing competition in numerous tough events. As of May 2023, eight of the world's top hundred players are from China, as is the world's highest-rated woman player, Hou Yifan. The former World chess champion Ding Liren and Women's World chess champion Ju Wenjun are also from China.

Chess has only gained popularity in China in the last few decades, and while chess has grown exponentially in China, it still trails Chinese chess (xiangqi) and go (weiqi) by a small margin. There are about three million people in China who play chess, of which 300,000 are in the federation.

In 1974 a seminal meeting was held in Kuala Lumpur that was attended by Malaysian Chess Federation President Dato Tan Chin Nam, a prominent businessman; Lim Kok Ann, then President of the Singapore Chess Association; President of the Japan Chess Association Yasuji Matsumoto; FIDE and Philippine Chess Federation President, Florencio Campomanes and two observers from the Chinese Embassy. The aim of this important meeting was to figure out how to raise the technical level of chess in Asia in order to reach the highest levels.

It was decided to promote chess first in China where it was believed to have the biggest potential for success. The plan came to be known in Asian chess circles as the "Big Dragon Project" and the man behind it was Dato Tan Chin Nam. He was instrumental in gaining China entrance into FIDE in 1976 and has since backed Asian and Chinese chess in particular financially. The Big Dragon plan called for the Chinese to reach world-class status by the end of the century, something that was largely achieved.

== Governing body ==
The national governing body for chess is the Chinese Chess Association, which runs the country's premier chess training academy, the National Chess Center in Beijing. (See Chess Centres.)

== Early history ==
Chess in its current form was developed in medieval to early modern Europe where in the 19th century modern tournament play began, and the first world chess championship was held. The most accepted view is that the direct ancestor of the game, shatranj, was transmitted by the Persians from ancient India, where it was known as chaturanga. Chaturanga is assumed to have also spread eastward to China, under the name of xiangqi ("elephant game"). According to the chess historian H. J. R. Murray, the earliest certain reference to xiangqi in Chinese sources dates to 762 AD (earlier passages containing the character xiang, which has several different meanings, cannot be proven to refer to elephant chess).

== Modern history ==
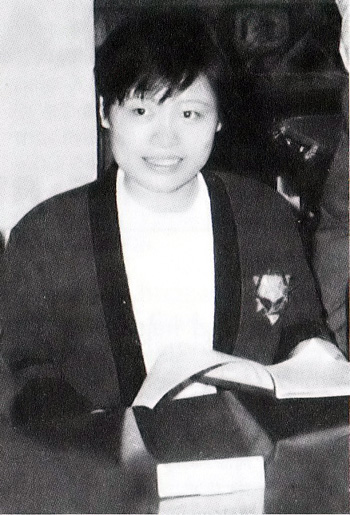
Xie Jun had two reigns as Women's World Chess Champion, from 1991 to 1996 and again from 1999 to 2001.

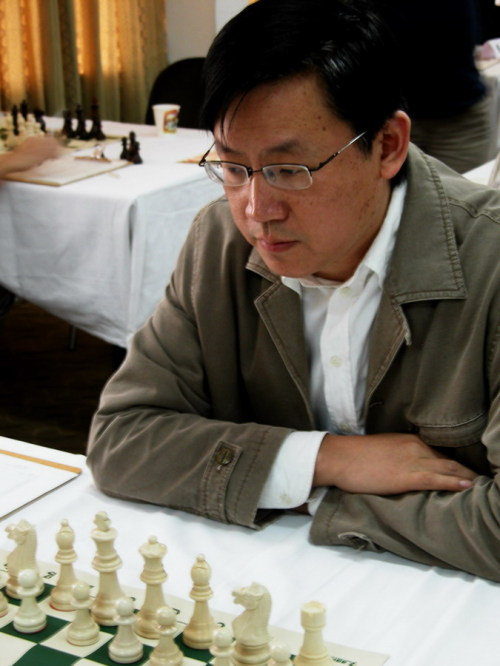
Ye Jiangchuan has been one of China's leading players in modern history and is the national team coach. He became National Champion for the first time in 1981

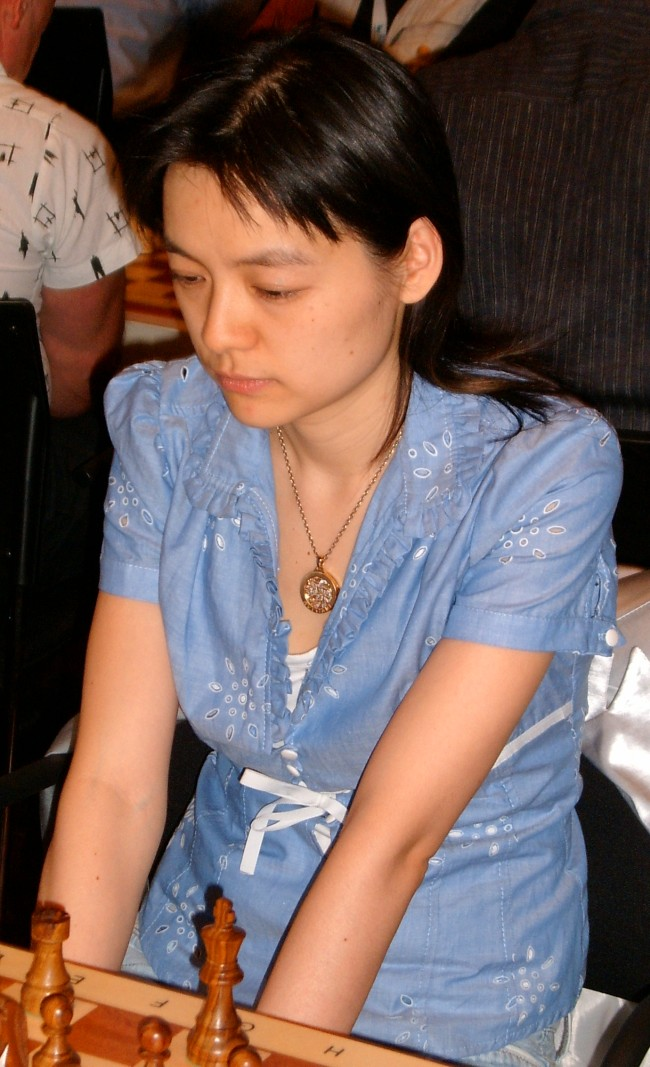
Zhu Chen became China's second women's world chess champion, after Xie Jun, in 2001

Zhang Pengxiang has been one of China's leading players in modern history and is one of the country's top trainers. He became National Champion in 2002

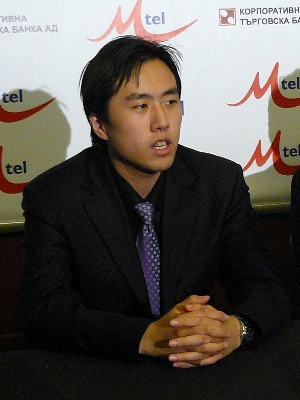
Bu Xiangzhi became at the time the world's youngest grandmaster in 1999. He became National Champion in 2004, and the Champion of the 2007 Blindfold Chess World Cup

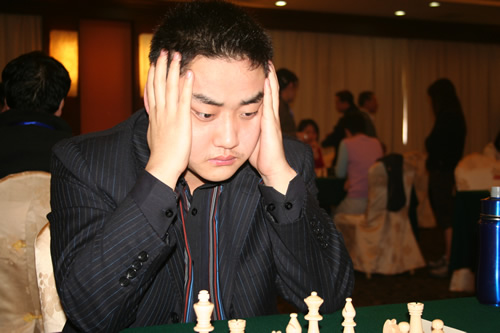
Wang Yue became the highest rated grandmaster in China and China's first world top-ten player. He became National Champion in 2005

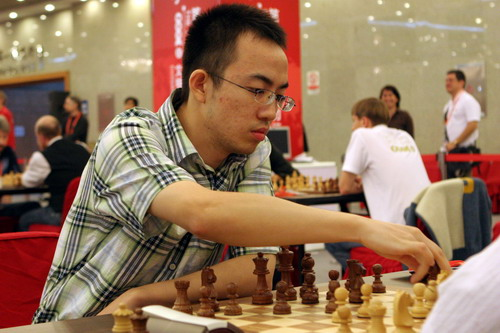
Ni Hua became National Champion three times in a row (2006–2008)

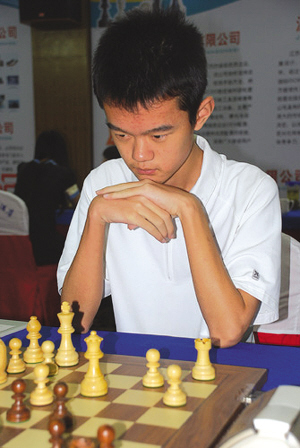
Ding Liren won the National Championship of China in 2009

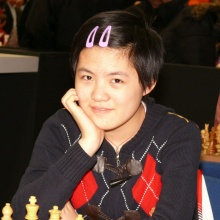
Hou Yifan holds the record for the youngest female grandmaster in history, achieving the title at the age of 14 years 6 months. She became National Women's Champion in 2007 and 2008

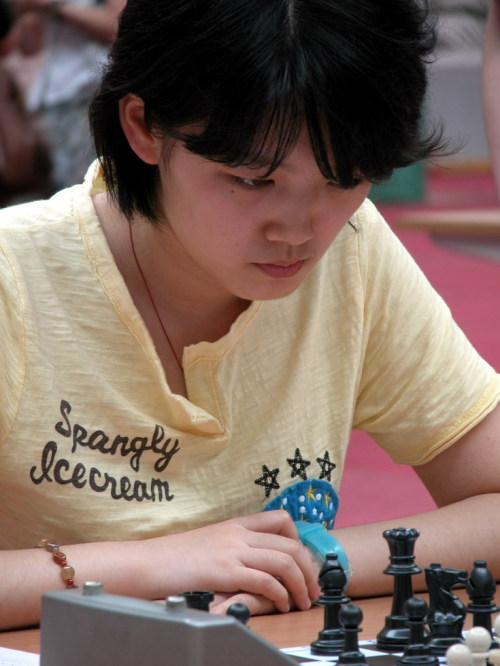
Shen Yang won the Women's National Championship of China (2009)

The European form of Chess was only introduced in China during the 19th century but has never been as popular as Weiqi or Xiangqi. Alexander Alekhine was the first great chess player to visit China in 1933. In an exhibition played in Shanghai, he was held to two draws, one to Xie Xiaxun Chinese: 谢侠逊, the leading xiangqi player, also nicknamed 总司令 (Chinese for Top Commander) of the first half of the 20th century and later nicknamed "Centurian chess king" because at 100 years old, he was a strong player in all the three strategy board games. Xie Xiaxun (not related to former women's world champion Xie Jun), helped to promote the game and was the top player in China after World War II. In 1935, he visited Malaya and Singapore and defeated their champion as well as the British Air Forces champion Hunter. In 1936, in Guangzhou, the British sponsored a tournament with top players from Austria, Britain, China, Germany and the United States. Xie won the tournament convincingly by drawing one and winning the other 18 games. In 1987, Xie (who lived in Wenzhou) died at the age of 101.

Chess was not listed as a competitive sport in China until 1956. In the same year, the 1st Chess Exhibition Tournament was held in Beijing, where only six players from four provinces participated. But at the National Chess Tournament held one year later, 22 players from approximately 10 provinces and cities were attending. From 1957 to 1966, national competition was almost held once a year and the number of players grew exponentially.

The Chess Association of China was formed in 1962 as a minor affiliate of the Chinese Xiangqi Association due to the lack of popularity for the game at the time and only became a fully-fledged independent organization in 1986. It has been only in the last 30 or so years that chess has made major inroads in China, where the game is seen as the poorer cousin of the more popular xiangqi. Chess was banned during the first eight years of the Cultural Revolution (1966–1976), but by 1974 there was an easing of the ban that saw China begin to participate in international competitions, the first being in 1976.

In the early 1960s, chess classes were conducted at Children's Palaces or Amateur Sports Schools in key chess cities such as Shanghai, Beijing, Wenzhou and Hangzhou. From the mid-1970s, junior chess classes have also been established consecutively in Chengdu, Guangzhou, Shanxi and Tianjin, where professional chess coaches were hired or arranged to deliver trainings. This has facilitated the growth of many young players. Many big names had been trained at those chess classes when they were young, such as female grandmasters Liu Shilan and Wu Minqian; female master An Yanfeng; male master Qi Jingxuan, Li Zunian, Liang Jinrong, Yang Xian, Lin Ta, Ma Hongding (马红丁, born in 1963) and Wang Li.

Before the ban on chess was imposed in 1966, the Chinese national team played four international matches with the Soviet Union, represented by master players.

After the end of the Chinese National Chess Championship Final in December 1958, three Soviet masters, Boris Baranov, Mamadzhan Mukhitdinov and Alexander Grushevsky visited China. They met top three finishers of Chinese National Chess Championship in Cultural Garden, Guangzhou. The Chinese lost all three games. In the game Grushevsky-Xian Quan (later known as Sin Kuen after leaving to Hong Kong) the Chinese had good winning chances in the middlegame but blundered badly and lost. The USSR team then went to Shanghai and Hohhot, where they met local chess players and defeating them all as well.

In 1963, China invited a Soviet team to play the return match. To prepare for the match, the Chinese National Sports Committee from June 14 – July 15 selected over 20 players from all over the country to form a National Chess Training Team: Deng Wenxiang, Feng Bingrong, Feng Zuquan, Hong Kemin, Hou Chengji, Huang Xinzhai, Jian Mingji, Li Chengyi, Li Zhongjian, Li Zhu, Liu Chengwan, Liu Zhenguo, Lu Zhuoran, Qian Zongxiang, Wang Bijun, Wu Weiwen, Xu Hongshun, Xu Jialiang, Xu Tianli, Zhang Donglu, Zhang Fujiang and Zhu Fushan. Jian Mingji, the young player from Guangdong, who changed his name to Kan Wai Shui when he left to Hong Kong, took the first place in the round robin qualifying tournament.

In early September 1963, the following qualified eight players from their results: Xu Tianli, Jian Mingji, Deng Wenxiang, Xu Hongshun, Zhang Donglu, Huang Xinzhai, Feng Bingrong and Li Zhongjian. They traveled from Shanghai to Beijing to meet the Soviet team. In September it was confirmed that the Soviets would be led by GM Andor Lilienthal, and other two players were IM Mikhail Yudovich and Vladimir Zagorovsky. As preparation the Chinese team looked at their opponents’ games in order to analyze their style of play and predict what kind of strategy or tactics would be used.

- Beijing (September 8–12, 1963): the soviet team arrived at the Yuexin Palace, Beihai (North Sea) Garden, Beijing, to play the first three rounds of the match with a total of nine games. Huang Zhong, Chinese Deputy Chairman of the National Sports Committee also attended to watch the match. It was the first occasion that Chinese chess players had met strong foreign players. They played cautiously and fought hard with tension and excitement. Although the Chinese did their best, the Soviets were just too strong for them, winning six games and drawing three.
- Shanghai (September 16–20, 1963): the teams then played in Shanghai, where the venue was Shanghai Sports Club to host another set of three rounds. Huang Xinzhai, the young player from Shanghai, scored historic win against Zagorovsky in 6th round, which was the only Chinese success in the whole match. Huang Xinzhai was a fan of xiangqi since his childhood and he won in 1957 the Shanghai Secondary School Xiangqi Championship. He learned chess from Xie Xiaxun (Centenarian Xiangqi King) and, in 1959, he won the 2nd National Chess Games Championship in Shanghai. Later he won the Chinese Chess Championship in 1965.
- Hangzhou (September 22–24, 1963): the last two rounds (with a total of six games) were played in Hangzhou. The match was won by the Soviet team +15=8-1 overall. Even though the Chinese team lost by a large margin again, compared to the previous meeting in 1958, the Chinese leading players' abilities were vastly improved. It was noted that the Soviet and Chinese players often analyzed together just after the finished game showing good friendship and respect. The Communist Party and Chinese authorities also took interest in the match, as when the USSR team arrived in Beijing, the Chinese Premier Zhou Enlai himself greeted and received the Soviet players with honours.

The third match was played in Moscow in 1964 with China being led by the Chief of National Sports Wushu (martial arts) Mao Bohao, while five team members were Jian Mingji, Xu Tianli, Zhang Donglu, Xu Hongshun, Huang Xinzhai. They arrived on June 4. This was the first time the Chinese national chess team played abroad. They played three matches.

The first one was played in Moscow University resulting in five draws. But the second round, played in the club of automotive factory in Moscow, was a one sided battle. Only Xu Tianli scraped a draw, while others lost. The third match was played in Moscow Chess Association's hall. The Chinese lost all the games.

On December 7, 1965, there was a friendship match between players of USSR and China in Beijing. In the 6 round competitions, China scored one victory, one draw and four losses. The Soviet team was led by GM Nikolai Krogius with his teammates Felix Ignatiev, Boris Shatskes, Yuriy Vasilchuk, Mamadzhan Mukhitdinov and Boris Shipov. They played three friendly matches in Beijing, Shanghai and Hangzhou. In these three matches the Chinese team scored 10 wins 17 draws and 27 losses. China's Liu Wenzhe and Zhang Donglu both beat GM Krogius in their games and they were the best among Chinese players – 5 points out of 8 games with 62.5%

In 1974, at the invitation of the Malaysian business tycoon Dato Tan Chin Nam, then President of the reorganized Malaysian Chess Federation, China was invited to attend the 1st Asian Team Championship with observer status. It was also in 1974 that China held its first National Championship tournament. The first international tournament ever held in China was in 1980.

In 1975, Dato Tan Chin Nam decided that chess in China had enormous potential, and set-up the "Big Dragon Project"; the aim being to see China dominate the chess world by 2010. He said, "I am behind the cause of chess in China for my whole lifetime. And after me, my children will carry on." China now holds every title in the women's game, and are now starting to make progress in the much tougher men's game. Dato Tan Chin Nam also founded the Tan Chin Nam Cup in China – a competition that sees top GMs from Eastern Europe meeting Chinese players.

Also in 1975, the Chinese Chess Association officially joined FIDE. China came second in the next Asian Team Championship held in Auckland, New Zealand in 1977. China was second again in the next two editions in Singapore in 1979 and in China in 1981. China won the series for the first time in 1983 in India, and won the inaugural women's event in Singapore in 1995.

China came second at the Asian Team Championship in their debut in November 1977. After that, China won the Asian championship for the next two consecutive years. In 1983, China defeated the Philippines Team, the then titleholder of all previous Asian Chess championships and won the winning the title of Asian Champion.

At the 6th National Games in 1987 in Guangdong, chess together with traditional I-go and Chinese chess were listed as competition items and held for men's teams and women's teams.

China has taken part in the Chess Olympiads since 1978, the first in Buenos Aires, Argentina. It was here that the Chinese soon put themselves on the map when one of their players, Liu Wenzhe, rated a mere 2200, defeated in spectacular style with a stunning queen sacrifice a top Western Grandmaster, the hapless Jan Hein Donner of The Netherlands, in just 20 moves. Since then, China has made rapid progress with the women's team taking the bronze medal and the men's team coming sixth at the 1990 Olympiad. At the Novi Sad FIDE Congress in 1990 China was awarded the status of "one-zone federation" (3.5), a decision which was inevitable given the various game-throwing scandals in the 1980s which made China's position in the Asia-Pacific zone untenable. Nonetheless, despite having only one Grandmaster, it was already clear that China would soon be worthy of their own zone. In Novi Sad the Chinese open team beat or drew with some of the strong teams and finished 18th. China's women went on to retain their position in the next two Olympiads and in 1996 won the silver medals. Meanwhile, the open team never have ranked below 15th place. In December, 1980, three Chinese teenage girls made their debut. They drew with the world champion USSR Team in the Chess Olympiad and tied for 5th place. In later Chess Olympiads, held every two years, China continued to make progress. At the 27th Chess Olympiad held in Dubai, UAE, they tied for 3rd place. Chinese Woman Grandmaster, Liu Shilan, who played on the first board ranked third of that board, was granted the Best Player. China Women's Team surprisingly won over several tough games with teams such as former World Runner-up, Bulgaria and former World Bronze Medalist, Romania. And they lost the game with USSR Team only by 1 to 2. China open team also got prominent results in the past two sessions of the Chess Olympiad. The team tied for 8th place in the 26th Chess Olympiad in 1984. In the 27th Chess Olympiad held in 1986, where 108 teams participated, they drew the former World Champion, Yugoslavia team and tied for 5th place with Bulgaria and Iceland by 9 victories, 1 draw and 4 losses. This was the highest place ever achieved by an Asian open team at an Olympiad. The best result in the past was 11th place achieved by the Philippines.

Chinese players also made improvement in Individual Chess Competitions. Liu Shilan won 1st place in Asia by sweeping the board in 14 games, entered World Champion Candidate Competition, namely the quarterfinal, and was entitled grandmaster. In 1985, An Yanfeng, Wu Minqian and Zhao Lan swept the first 3 places in Asian Area Competition. Wu Minqian later was admitted to the quarterfinal and won the title of grandmaster as well. Other women players got excellent results in international competitions. An Yanfeng, Zhao Lan and Wu Xiaoying were entitled masters. Ning Chunhong won 2nd place in Asia. He Tianjian, Xie Jun and Peng Zhaoqin were invited to visit USSR. Many Chinese men players have beaten world-famous grandmasters in international competitions. In the Asian Area Qualifying Trial held in Laoag, Philippines, Chinese players Qi Jingxuan, Li Zunian and Ye Jiangchuan swept the top three prizes.

In the 1990s, Chinese women chess players reached the summit of the world and men's team also achieved world class level. Chess became far more popular as a result of Xie Jun becoming the women's world champion in 1991. She made a historical breakthrough for the non-European players in this field. After retaining her title match in 1993, interest in chess was raised even further with an estimated one million chess players in China. In 1994, Xie Jun became the first Asian (and the first Chinese) female grandmaster. The China Women's Team won 1st place in the Olympiad in 1998 for the first time. At the same time, men players like Ye Jiangchuan, Zhang Zhong and Ni Hua also gradually gained excellent results in various competitions.

Officials of the Chinese Chess Association have been appointed by the National Sports Committee which also provides funding. The three strategy board games share a common headquarters called QiYuan (Chess Academy) normally with a dormitory with twin-sharing rooms on the top floor. The three respective national chess associations operate in China QiYuan situated in Beijing, while Beijing has its own (local) Beijing QiYuan. Similar structures were also set up in most major cities and today, there are more than 30 Qiyuans in China. At these Qiyuans, the paid officials run their day-to-day affairs and trainers conduct chess classes. Each QiYuan has its own management committee. At the (National) China QiYuan, the chairman is Chen Zude who is also the President of the Chinese Chess Association. Every QiYuan had been allocated state subsidies to the three strategy board games. Since the restructuring of the Chinese government in May 1998, sports had to fund themselves by 2001. During the three year transition period, funding from the government was reduced by 30% each year.

Fortunately for the Chinese Chess Association, in 1993, it received an endowment fund from Singapore businessman Lee Seng Tee who donated about US$1.5 million. 10% of this donation was for the establishment of the chess library at China QiYuan. The remaining 90% were deposited in a fixed account from which the Chinese Chess Association drew interest mainly for its administrative operations and to send players for overseas competitions. In 1997, the Chinese Chess Association founded a computer company to fund its other activities on an annual basis.

Decision making is done collectively and any final decision is only taken after thorough discussion and more important ones are referred to the Sports Committee. Since May 1998, all Qiyuans have been autonomous from China QiYuan but still they cooperate like one organization.

Another major benefactor was Prof Lim Kok Ann (1920–2003) who managed to move sponsors into investing in chess in China via the creation of the Dato Tan Chin Nam and ST Lee Cup tournaments. He was most helpful to the Chinese women talents; opening doors for their participation in tournaments in Europe with the aim of seeing the Chinese attain world-class standards. His and others' efforts helped, in part, contribute to the creation of two Women's World Champions, Xie Jun (1991–1996, 1999–2001) and Zhu Chen (2001–2004) (ref.).

The first visit of world champion Anatoly Karpov in August 1997 boosted the popularity of chess further. During this visit, Karpov played three exhibitions in Beijing which were broadcast live on television. He also appeared for a one-hour talk show viewed live on prime time slot during the most popular TV program in China. His visit was widely publicized across China and because of his unusual popularity, he was invited by the government to another visit in May 1998.

Karpov's second visit took him to Beijing, Shenyang, Shanghai and Guangzhou – four of the five largest cities in China. He also took the opportunity to launch the Chinese edition of his book Disney's Guide to Chess and appeared to autograph his books at major bookstores in each city he visited. There were 20,000 copies for the first printing and more than half were sold within one week of his visit. Karpov played a total of five exhibitions and once again, the immense publicity raised the interest of chess to another level.

At present, in terms of media publicity, chess is ahead followed by weiqi and then xiangqi. In terms of playing interest, weiqi still commands the lead followed by chess and xiangqi but it has been estimated that 10 million people have learnt to play chess by 2000. On a site inspection visit by Tang Kum-Foo and Ignatius Leong from Intchess Asia in February 1998, among 5 cities they visited was Wenzhou, a commercial seaport on the eastern coast. There they were invited to 3 kindergartens and witnessed about 2,200 children playing chess in classrooms. All the teachers there knew and taught the game to the children. China's first men's Grandmaster Ye Rongguang and female Grandmaster Zhu Chen come from Wenzhou. Based on statistical criteria, Wenzhou is the only city awarded the status of "Chess City" by China QiYuan.

There are more than 1,000 chess trainers in China and about 300 professionals. The Beijing City Center Youth Championships held in August 1998, saw 574 children contesting the age-group championships; 233 for chess, 187 for xiangqi, and 154 in weiqi.

In 1981, China organized the Asian Team Championship in Hangzhou. In 1990, China hosted the second part of the Women's Candidates Final Match between Yugoslav Grandmaster Alisa Marić and GM Xie Jun. The 1993 Women's Candidates Tournament won by Hungarian Grandmaster Zsuzsa Polgar was played in China. In recent years, were the S T Lee Beijing International Open and the Dato Tan Chin Nam Invitational Tournaments.

In 1998, the controversial Women's Candidates Final Match between Russian Grandmaster Alisa Galliamova and GM Xie Jun in August and the first ever Asian Chess Open were held in Shenyang. The registration of Galliamova and her subsequent non-appearance for the match had been a talking point among the Chinese people and a daily forum in the press.

For September 1999, in celebration of the 50th anniversary of the People's Republic of China, the city of Shenyang had won the right over international cities to host the second edition of the World Cities Team Championship. An industrial town with a population of 6.5 million people, Shenyang hosted the Asian Sports Festival which included 30 non-Olympic sports and chess. About 1,500 participants from 40 countries took part in the 2-week festival. In 2000, Shenyang unveiled the largest regional chess venue in China with space to hold 1,000 players, the Shenyang Qipanshan International Chess and Card Competitive Center, estimated to have cost US$25million.

Following the World Cities Team Championship, Shenyang hosted the 1st FIDE World Cup (won by Viswanathan Anand and Xu Yuhua in the men's and women's section, respectively) and the Shenyang Open Tournament. Four Grandmaster Tournaments were held in other cities. Shenyang also organized the Asian Team Championship, the S T Lee International Open, the Tan Chin Nam Cup Grandmaster Tournament and two more Grandmaster Tournaments have been regularly held in other cities.

In 2003, Judit Polgár played two simultaneous exhibitions in Shanghai and Wuxi, with +31=7–2 and +29=5–2 results. She also played a six-game blitz match against Bu Xiangzhi, winning 5–1. After that she visited Beijing as a tourist with her husband. Chinese media covered her visit extensively.

In September 2003, The Kings and Queens rapid chess tournament was held in Yong Chuan. It was won by the tandem pair of Nigel Short and Zhao Xue, who took the title a full point ahead of their nearest rivals, Yasser Seirawan and Zhu Chen. After the Kings and Queens tandem chess matches the players flew to Jinan to play normal chess in the Three Arrows Cup. The Beijing Chess Challenge Match was held later in September in the China Resources Hotel, Beijing, which had an international team versus two Chinese teams: International Team players: Evgeny Bareev g RUS 2721, Nigel Short g ENG 2701, Yasser Seirawan g USA 2626; Chinese Team A players: Ye Jiangchuan g 2683, Zhang Zhong g 2658, Xu Jun g 2626; Chinese Team B players: Bu Xiangzhi g 2588, Zhang Pengxiang g 2567, Ni Hua f 2533.

== Computer chess ==
The 16th World Computer Chess Championship, the 13th Computer Olympiad and the Conference on Computers and Games 2008 (CG2008) was held in Beijing from September 28 to October 5, 2008.

== World Mind Sports Games ==
The 1st World Mind Sports Games took place in Beijing after the 2008 Summer Olympics from October 3–18, 2008. Twenty five to thirty gold medals was vied for an estimated 2000 competitors from 150 countries. There were five mind sports, being chess, bridge, go, draughts and xiangqi. The Games were under the aegis of GAISF and organized by the International Mind Sports Association (IMSA) of which FIDE is a founding member. For chess players, there were competitions of Rapid and Blitz chess for individuals, pairs and teams. The Individual was limited to 50 players, men and women. In the pairs event, teams of one man and one woman from each federation participated, maximum 50 teams. In the teams events, maximum of 80 men's teams and 50 women's teams were invited with teams of 4 players plus one reserve. Altogether 10 gold medals was available for chess plus a trophy for the leading federation over all chess disciplines.

Men's team

- Bu Xiangzhi
- Ni Hua
- Wang Yue
- Wang Hao
- Zhou Jianchao

Women's team

- Hou Yifan
- Zhao Xue
- Xu Yuhua
- Shen Yang
- Huang Qian

== Pearl Spring Nanjing ==
A Super GM Six-player double round robin Tournament event took place in Nanjing, Jiangsu from December 10–22, 2008. The six players were Veselin Topalov g BUL 2791; Vassily Ivanchuk g UKR 2786; Levon Aronian g ARM 2757; Sergei Movsesian g 2732 SVK; Peter Svidler g 2727; Bu Xiangzhi g CHN 2714. It was the strongest tournament ever held in China (at least by Elo average, 2751.6, making it a category 21 tournament). The Nanjing tournament will become one of the grand slam events similar to Corus chess tournament, M-Tel Masters, and Linares chess tournament.

== National Mind Sports Games ==
The First National Mind Sports Games took place in 13 to 23 November 2009 in Chengdu, Sichuan. The event is sponsored by General Administration of Sport of China and was participated by over 2, 600 competitors from 46 parties in China, took part in some 43 events of six disciplines. Chess is one of the games amongst another six games (weiqi, xiangqi, chess, contract bridge, gobang, draughts). The chess section has 8 gold medals: open team rapid, women team rapid, open individual rapid, women individual rapid, open individual blitz, women individual blitz, boys team classic, girls team classic.

== World Team Championships ==
- 1985 Team: IM Qi Jingxuan, IM Li Zunian, IM Ye Jiangchuan, Xu Jun, Lin Ta, Ye Rongguang, Wu Xibin; China -– winners of 1983 Asian Team Championship;
- 1989 Team: IM Ye Jiangchuan, IM Xu Jun, IM Liang Jinrong, IM Ye Rongguang, IM Wang Zili, FM Lin Ta; China – winners of Asian play-off;
- 1993 Team: IM Xu Jun, IM Lin Weiguo, IM Peng Xiaomin, Li Wenliang; China – winners of 1989 and 1991 Asian Team Championship;
- 1997 Team: did not participate
- 2001 Team: did not participate
- 2005 Team: Bu Xiangzhi, Zhang Pengxiang, Ni Hua, Zhang Zhong, Zhou Jianchao, Liang Chong; China – winners of 2003 Asian Team Championship;
  - WGM Zhao Xue, WIM Huang Qian, WGM Wang Yu, Gong Qianyun, Shen Yang, Hou Yifan; China (women) - winners of women's 2004 Olympiad;
- 2009 Team: Wang Yue, Wang Hao, Bu Xiangzhi, Ni Hua, Zhou Jianchao, Ding Liren (continental champions)

== Asian Indoor Games ==
In the 3rd Asian Indoor Games in Vietnam, China won three Gold, two Silvers and a Bronze, topping the overall medals table.

== Asian Games ==
The November 2010 Asian Games in Guangzhou featured chess. China won a total of five medals; three Golds, a Silver and a bronze medal.

== Shanghai–Bilbao Grand Slam Masters Final ==
The first two Grand Slam Finals were held in Bilbao, Spain. The first year (2008) it was a 6-player double round-robin won by Veselin Topalov, and the second year (2009) a 4-player double round-robin was won by Levon Aronian.

For 2010, the event was split into two parts: the first half occurred in Shanghai (September 3–12). The four participants in the first stagewere: Wang Hao, as best Chinese player (20th ranked); Alexei Shírov, as best Spanish player (9th ranked); Levon Aronian, as winner of the Final Chess Masters 2009 (5th ranked); and Vladimir Kramnik (4th ranked). The second half was held in Bilbao (October 6–14). The top two qualified in Shanghai played in Bilbao along with Magnus Carlsen, winner of the tournaments in Wijk aan Zee, Nanjing and Bazna, and Viswanathan Anand, the then-World Champion. The 39th Chess Olympiad in Khanty-Mansiysk was played from September 19 – October 4 in between the two parts.

== Statistics ==
Below statistics is valid for active players only (as of May 2026):

- Grandmaster: 38
- Woman Grandmaster: 9
- International Master: 39
- Woman International Master: 15
- FIDE Master: 14
- Woman FIDE Master: 11
- Average ELO rating of top 10 players: 2666 (2nd by country rank)
- Number of players in FIDE Top 100: 6
- Number of players in Top 100 Women: 16
- Number of players in Top 20 Juniors: 1
- Number of players in Top 20 Girls: 1
- Total (inactive inclusive): 3029
- Total (active only): 865

=== Records ===
- First grandmaster: Ye Rongguang (1990)
- First female grandmaster: Xie Jun (1994)
- First player to defeat a grandmaster: Liu Wenzhe (v. Jan Hein Donner, at the 23rd Chess Olympiad, Buenos Aires, November 2, 1978)
- First player to reach a rating of 2600: Ye Jiangchuan (January 2000)
- First player to reach a rating of 2700: Wang Yue (October 2007)
- First player to reach a rating of 2800: Ding Liren (September 2018)
- Highest rating achieved by a player: Ding Liren (2816)
- First female world champion: Xie Jun (1991)
- First male qualifier for Candidates Tournament in the World Championship cycle: Ding Liren (qualified for the Candidates Tournament for the 2018 World Chess Championship by advancing to the finals of the 2017 Chess World Cup)
- Youngest ever grandmaster: Bu Xiangzhi at 13 years, 10 months, 13 days (set in 1999, since broken)
- Youngest Chinese grandmaster: Wei Yi at 13 years, 8 months, 23 days (set in 2013)
- Youngest ever female grandmaster: Hou Yifan at 14 years, 6 months, 2 days (set in 2008, current)
- Youngest ever women's world champion: Hou Yifan at 16 years (set in 2010, current)
- Most consecutive Women's World Chess Championship titles: Ju Wenjun with 3.
- Most Women's World Chess Championship titles: Xie Jun and Hou Yifan, with 4 each.
- First World Chess Champion: Ding Liren (2023)

=== Strength ===
==== World Champions ====
Tan Zhongyi won the 2017 Women's World Chess Championship, succeeding Hou Yifan, who had held the title since 2010. Previously there were three Chinese players who have been Women's World Champion, Xu Yuhua (2006-2008), Zhu Chen (2001–2004) and Xie Jun (twice: 1991–1996; 1999–2001).

Ding Liren won the World Chess Championship 2023, being the first player in China to accomplish this feat.

Ju Wenjun won 3 consecutive Women's World Chess Championships held between 2018 and 2020.

==== Highest rated player ====
The current strongest ranked Chinese player is 26-year-old Wei Yi, ranked 8th in the world as of May 2026 with a rating of 2754.

==== Average national rating ====
Chinese players have the highest average rating of any nation on the most recent FIDE list. Their 330 players average 2245.

==== World Top Lists ====
As of May 2026, the number of Chinese chess players in the:

- World's Top 100: 6
- World's Top 100 Women: 16
- World's Top 100 Juniors (age under 20): 5
- World's Top 100 Girls: 5

==== GM and WGM Titles ====
China has produced 38 Grandmasters (32 male, 6 female) and 21 Woman Grandmasters in total.

Grandmaster-titled players

Name	Birth date	Sex	Year GM title earned	Activity	Peak rating	Notes
Bu Xiangzhi	1985.12.10	M	1999	Active	2730	See Chess prodigy
Ding Liren	1992.10.24	M	2009	Active	2816	World Chess Champion
Gao Rui	1992.05.20	M	2013	Active	2555	
Hou Yifan	1994.02.27	F	2008	Active	2686	World's youngest ever female grandmaster and Women's World Chess Champion
Ju Wenjun	1991.01.31	F	2014	Active	2604	She obtained the title with 5 successful GM norms (3 by Fide Women's Grand Prix)
Li Chao	1989.04.21	M	2007	Active	2757	
Li Shilong	1977.08.10	M	2002	Active	2559	
Liang Chong	1980.01.29	M	2004	Active	2588	
Liang Jinrong	1960.05.21	M	1997	Active	2536	
Lu Shanglei	1995.07.10	M	2011	Active	2641	
Ma Qun	1991.11.9	M	2013	Active	2626	
Ni Hua	1983.05.31	M	2003	Active	2724	
Peng Xiaomin	1973.04.08	M	1997	Active	2657	
Wang Hao	1989.08.04	M	2005	Active	2752	
Wang Yue	1987.03.31	M	2004	Active	2756	
Wang Rui	1978.04.18	M	2009	Active	2526	
Wang Zili	1968.06.14	M	1995	Inactive	2603	
Wei Yi	1999.06.02	M	2013	Active	2753	9th youngest Grandmaster in history (as of 2023), world's youngest to reach 2700 ELO rating, second youngest to reach 2600 (Wei's record was broken by John M. Burke)
Wen Yang	1988.07.07	M	2008	Active	2631	
Wu Shaobin	1969.02.04	M	1998	Active	2545	Now plays for Singapore
Wu Wenjin	1976.03.10	M	2000	Active	2602	
Xie Jun	1970.10.30	F	1993	Active	2574	Winning Women's World Chess Championship in 1991 - but not yet a title 'automatism'
Xiu Deshun	1989.02.01	M	2011	Active	2585	
Xu Jun	1962.09.17	M	1994	Active	2668	
Xu Yuhua	1976.10.29	F	2006	Active	2517	Achieved GM title by becoming Women's World Champion; also has WGM title
Ye Jiangchuan	1960.11.20	M	1993	Active	2684	
Ye Rongguang	1963.10.03	M	1990	Inactive	2545	The first ever Chinese player to gain the Grandmaster title
Yu Ruiyuan	1991.09.13	M	2012	Active	2571	
Yu Shaoteng	1979.03.26	M	2004	Active	2550	
Yu Yangyi	1994.06.08	M	2009	Active	2765	
Zhang Pengxiang	1980.06.29	M	2001	Active	2657	
Zhang Zhong	1978.09.05	M	1998	Active	2667	Played for Singapore (2007–2017)
Zhao Jun	1986.12.12	M	2004	Active	2634	
Zhao Xue	1985.04.06	F	2008	Active	2579	
Zeng Chongsheng	1993.06.10	M	2013	Active	2541	
Zhou Jianchao	1988.06.11	M	2006	Active	2669	Now plays for the United States
Zhou Weiqi	1986.10.01	M	2008	Active	2646	
Zhu Chen	1976.03.16	F	2001	Active	2548	Now plays for Qatar

Woman Grandmaster-titled players

Name	Birth date	Year WGM title earned	Activity	Peak rating	Notes
Gu Xiaobing	1985.07.12	2003	Active	2371	
Hou Yifan	1994.02.27	2007	Active	2686	GM title
Huang Qian	1986.07.18	2008	Active	2494	
Ju Wenjun	1991.01.31	2009	Active	2604	
Li Ruofan	1978.04.30	2002	Active	2433	Played for Singapore (2006–2017)
Liu Shilan	1962.01.24	1982	Inactive	2260	
Ning Chunhong	1968.01.21	2001	Active	2406	
Qin Kanying	1974.02.02	1992	Inactive	2501	
Ruan Lufei	1987.10.02	2007	Active	2503	
Shen Yang	1989.01.23	2006	Active	2479	
Tan Zhongyi	1991.05.29	2009	Active	2530	
Tian Tian	1983.03.25	2002	Active	2355	
Wang Lei	1975.02.04	1996	Inactive	2512	
Wang Pin	1974.12.11	1992	Active	2506	
Wang Yu	1982.11.19	2003	Active	2438	IM title
Wu Mingqian	1961.01.08	1985	Inactive	2205	
Xu Yuanyuan	1981.03.08	2003	Inactive	2437	
Xu Yuhua	1976.10.29	2001	Active	2517	GM title
Zhang Jilin	1986.06.24	2007	Active	2361	
Zhang Xiaowen	1989.02.24	2009	Active	2437	
Zhao Xue	1985.04.06	2001	Active	2579	IM title

=== Former China players ===
- Peng Zhaoqin: now plays for the Netherlands
- Wu Shaobin: now plays for Singapore
- Yang Kaiqi: now plays for Canada
- Zhang Zhong: now plays for Singapore
- Zhu Chen: now plays for Qatar

=== Past players ===
Notable past players include (active years):

- Liu Wenzhe 1978–2000
- Wang Zili 1987–2005
- Wu Wenjin 1996–2005
- Ye Rongguang 1983–2005

== See also ==
- Chess around the world
- Chinese Chess Championship, national championship
- Asian Chess Championship, regional championship
- List of Chinese people
- List of chess players
