= Wu Wenjin =

Chinese chess grandmaster (born 1976)

Personal information
- Born: 10 March 1976 (age 50) Zhenjiang, Jiangsu, China

Chess career
- Country: China
- Title: Grandmaster (2000)
- Peak rating: 2602 (October 2000)
- Peak ranking: No. 86 (October 2000)

Wu Wenjin (Chinese: 吴文瑾; born 10 March 1976) is a Chinese chess Grandmaster.

In 2000, he became China's 11th Grandmaster.

== Career ==
Wu Wenjin won the Asian Junior Chess Championship in 1996 in Macau.

In October 1999, Wu came joint first (with Đào Thiên Hải, Peng Xiaomin, and Bu Xiangzhi) with 6 pts at the Qingdao Daily Cup. In November 2003, Wu came joint second (with Ni Hua, after Zhang Zhong) at the Chinese Men's Individual Chess Championship in Shan Wei. In November 2004, he came joint third (with Wang Yue) at the Chinese Chess Championship in Lanzhou. In December 2004, Wu finished third at the Singapore Masters.

Wu has competed for the China national chess team twice at the Men's Chess Olympiad (1998 and 2000) (games played 12: +5, =3, -4), and once at the Men's Asian Team Chess Championship (1999), with an overall record of 8 games (+5, =2, -1).

He reached his highest FIDE rating of 2602 in October 2000 when he was ranked 86th in the world.

== China Chess League ==
Wu Wenjin plays for Jiangsu chess club in the China Chess League (CCL).

== See also ==
- Chess in China
