= Tian Tian (chess player) =

Chinese chess player (born 1983)

Personal information
- Born: March 25, 1983 (age 43) Chongqing, China

Chess career
- Country: China
- Title: Woman Grandmaster (2002)
- FIDE rating: 2108 (October 2022)
- Peak rating: 2355 (July 2001)

Tian Tian (Chinese: 田甜; born March 25, 1983) is a Chinese chess Woman Grandmaster.

From 1999 to 2002 she went to Hungary to take part in tournaments and youth team championships in order to gain the Woman Grandmaster (WGM) title, which she did by gaining norms at the First Saturday IM tournament November 2001 and the First Saturday IM Group B tournament in December 2001, both held in Budapest.

Her current Elo rating is 2106 (February 2021). Her highest Elo rating was 2355 from July to December 2001. At that time she was tenth on the Chinese women's ranking list and 77th in the female world rankings. She was coached by Ji Yungi, a chess instructor and trainer of the Qingdao Chess Center.

== China Chess League ==
Tian Tian has played for Chongqing chess club in the China Chess League (CCL).

== See also ==
- Chess in China
