= An Yangfeng =

Chinese chess player (born 1963)

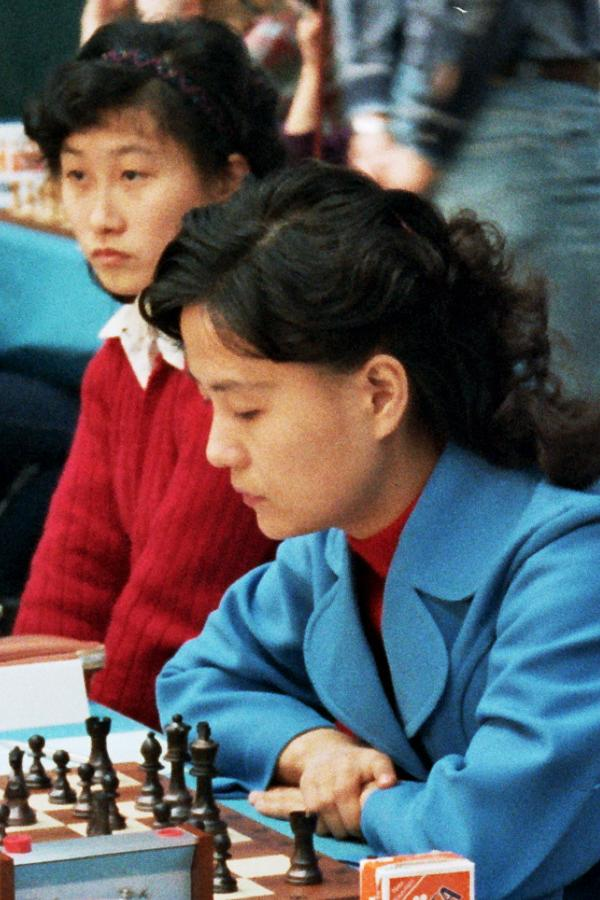
- An (red shirt) at the Chess Olympiad 1982 at Lucerne

Personal information
- Born: September 1, 1963 (age 62)

Chess career
- Country: China
- Title: Woman International Master (1981)
- Peak rating: 2259 (April 2001)

An Yangfeng (Chinese: 安艳凤; born 1 September 1963) is a Chinese chess player, who holds the title Woman International Master. She competed in two Women's Interzonal tournaments, at Havana in 1985 and at Smederevska Palanka in 1987.

An was a member of the Chinese national team at the Women's Chess Olympiad four times in 1980−1986. She played a total of 53 games scoring 28 wins, 13 draws, and 12 losses.

An Yangfeng plays for the Guangdong chess club in the China Chess League (CCL).

== See also ==
- Chess in China
