= Wu Shaobin =

Singaporean chess grandmaster (born 1969)

Personal information
- Born: 4 February 1969 (age 57) Anyang, Henan, China
- Spouse: Xie Jun

Chess career
- Country: Singapore; China
- Title: Grandmaster (1998)
- FIDE rating: 2447 (July 2026)
- Peak rating: 2545 (January 2003)

Wu Shaobin
- Simplified Chinese: 吴少彬
- Traditional Chinese: 吳少彬
Transcriptions
Standard Mandarin
- Hanyu Pinyin: Wú Shàobīn

Wu Shaobin (born 4 February 1969) is a Singaporean chess grandmaster. He won the national Singaporean Chess Championship in 2003 and 2005. He is married to Xie Jun, a former Women's World Chess Champion.

In 1998, Wu Shaobin became China's 8th Grandmaster. He played for China in the 1994 Chess Olympiad and for Singapore in the 2000, 2002 and 2004 Chess Olympiads. He gained the title of FIDE Trainer in 2005.

He has played for Shandong chess club in the China Chess League (CCL).

== See also ==
- Chess in China
