= Li Wenliang (chess player) =

Chinese chess player (born 1967)

Personal information
- Born: April 21, 1967 (age 59) Harbin, Heilongjiang, China

Chess career
- Country: China
- Title: International Master (1994)
- FIDE rating: 2429 (November 2026)
- Peak rating: 2511 (October 2001)

Li Wenliang (Chinese: 李文良; pinyin: Lǐ Wénliáng; born April 21, 1967) is a veteran Chinese chess player and (as of 2002) China's Deputy National Team Manager.

He has competed once at the World Men's Team Chess Championship in 1993, having played 9 games (+4 =4 -1). Though the team overall finished in 7th place, Li won an individual gold medal for his performance on board 4.

In 2008, he tied for 1st-5th with Yang Kaiqi, Salor Sitanggang, Jaan Ehlvest and Utut Adianto in the 1st Korea Open chess tournament in Seoul.

== China Chess League ==
Li Wenliang plays for Guangdong chess club in the China Chess League (CCL).

== See also ==
- Chess in China
