= Wang Yue (chess player) =

Chinese chess grandmaster (born 1987)

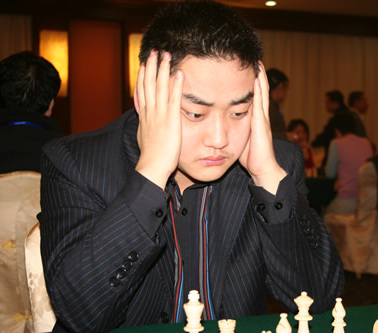
- Wang in 2008

Personal information
- Born: 31 March 1987 (age 39) Taiyuan, Shanxi

Chess career
- Country: China
- Title: Grandmaster (2004)
- FIDE rating: 2619 (October 2026)
- Peak rating: 2756 (November 2010)
- Peak ranking: No. 8 (May 2010)

Wang Yue (Chinese: 王玥; pinyin: Wáng Yuè; born 31 March 1987) is a Chinese chess player. In 2004, he became China's 18th grandmaster at the age of 17. He is China's first player ever to break into the top 10 of the FIDE world rankings and was the highest-ever rated Chinese player, with a peak rating of 2756, until August 2015, when this record was broken by Ding Liren.

In October 2007, Wang became the first Chinese player and third Asian player to cross the 2700 Elo rating mark. In October 2008, he became the world No. 11, the highest-ranking a Chinese player had ever achieved, surpassing the previous record of 17th by Ye Jiangchuan set in 2000. In January 2010, he became the first Chinese world top-ten player with a world ranking of 9. His highest world ranking to date is No. 8 in the May 2010 rating list with a rating of 2752.

In the FIDE Grand Prix 2008–2010, he was a last round victory over Teimour Radjabov away from joining Levon Aronian as an automatic qualifier for the Candidates Tournament of the World Chess Championship 2012 cycle; however, Radjabov secured a draw which allowed him to win the final qualifying position.

In 2008, Wang was a Communication Studies student at the College of Liberal Arts of Nankai University in Tianjin. He also played for his university club chess team.

== Early life ==
Wang was born in Taiyuan, Shanxi, where he learned to play chess at the age of four. He would during summer every day after dinner watch people play xiangqi in the streets. When he was 5, with the support of his parents he started to receive chess training at school and made rapid progress. When he was 9 he joined the National Junior Team and won the Li Chengzhi (李成智) National Children's Cup. At 12, he joined the National Team and at 15 he joined Tianjin City Club.

== Career ==
Wang has participated in several national team summit matches, including against the United States (2002), Russia (2004, 2006, 2007, 2008, 2009), France (2006) and the UK (2007).

=== 1999–2005: Junior player ===
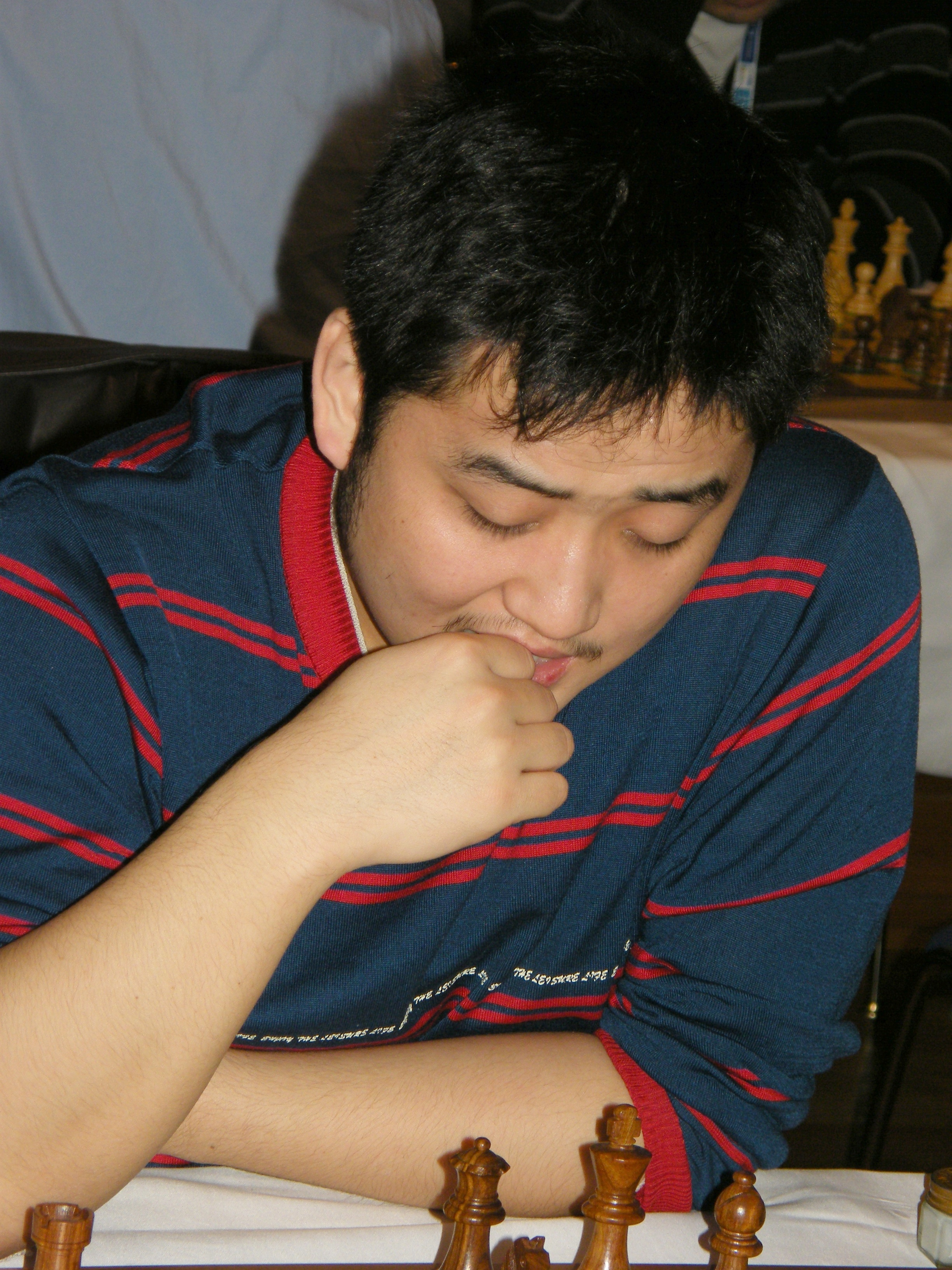
Wang at the 38th Chess Olympiad, November 2008 in Dresden, Germany

In 1999, Wang won the under-12 category of the World Youth Chess Championship in Oropesa del Mar, Spain.

In 2000, he came second in the U-14 category World Youth Championship, which was also held in Oropesa del Mar, to Alexander Areshchenko. That year, in Artek, Ukraine, and again in 2002 in Kuala Lumpur, Malaysia, he competed for the China national chess team at the World Youth U-16 Chess Olympiads. In 2000, the team came 9th, with Wang scoring 6/9 (+4−1=4) with a 2430 performance. The 2002 team won gold and he also achieved on first board an individual gold medal for his stunning result of 8½/10 (+7−0=3) with a 2657 performance. He was supported by teammate Zhao Jun who had an 80% score on board 2.

In July–August 2002, at the Second China–USA Match in Shanghai, Wang scored 2½/4 (+1−0=3) with a performance of 2526. He played Hikaru Nakamura once in the last round which was a draw, and all the other first three games were against Vinay Bhat. China won 20½–19½ overall.

In April 2004, Wang scored the highest with 9/11 at the Chinese Men's Team Championships in Jinan. In August of that year, at the 2nd China–Russia Match in Moscow, Wang scored 3/6 (+1−1=4) with a 2670 performance. China won the match 37½–34½. Continuing, from October 14–31, when Wang became a FIDE master, he competed in his debut Olympiad in Calvià, Mallorca, Spain, scoring 8/12 (+5−1=6) on the first reserve board with a 2621 performance. The team finished in 24th place and Wang finished on 16th in the individual board standings. At this event he achieved his last GM norm and became China's then youngest grandmaster. December 18–23 saw him at the Tigran Petrosian Memorial Internet Tournament, with games starting at 12:00 noon in Paris, 14:00 in St. Petersburg. 15:00 in Yerevan and 19:00 in Beijing. Each country faced each of the other three countries two times for a total of six rounds. Fischer time control will be used (1 hour 30 minutes plus 15 minutes added at move 40; 30 second increments are added after every move). The event took place on ICC. China won the Tigran Petrosian Memorial Internet Tournament. Their final round match against Russia came down to the wire. The Russians led 2–1 but Wang beat Vadim Zvjaginsev to tie the match and win the event for the Chinese. Final Scores: China 14–France 13–Russia 13–Armenia 8. China players: (average rating: 2590) GM Bu Xiangzhi 2615 GM Ni Hua 2611 GM Zhang Zhong 2596 GM Wang Yue 2536

In February 2005, Wang scored 5½/9 at the Aeroflot Open. In April, he scored 6/9 at the Dubai Open. It was won by 16-year-old Wang Hao. In July, he came third on tiebreak with 6½/11 (+3−1=7) at the 2nd Sanjin International Hotel GM Cup in his hometown Taiyuan. Pendyala Harikrishna won with 8½/11 a point clear of Alexander Motylev. In October, he also came third with 6½/9 at the 5th Asian Individual Championship in Hyderabad, India. In November, he came fifth with 8½/13 at the World Junior Chess Championship in Istanbul, and reached the second round of the FIDE World Cup having beaten and lost to Karen Asrian and Ilya Smirin, respectively.

In December 2005, he became the youngest National men's Champion of China, with a score of 12½/18 in Beijing. Also, in 2005 he won both the National Youth Championship and the National Collegiate Championship.

=== 2006: Becomes a 2600 Elo player ===
In February, Wang scored 4½/9 at the Aeroflot Open. In June at the 37th Chess Olympiad in Turin, the national team, seeded 12, came second winning silver. Wang, on board four, went undefeated scoring 10/12 points (8 wins and 4 draws) and received an individual gold medal for this board four result, as well as an individual silver medal for his rating performance of 2837 (the second highest of all players after Vladimir Kramnik of Russia).

On July 10–22 at the Taiyuan Scheveningen Event, the Chinese team won 36½–35½ against the foreign side with Wang scoring 6½/12. From 28 July to 7 August, at the 4th Marx György Memorial (Category 15 av 2622 of July'06 ratings) in Paks, Hungary, Wang scored 5/10 (+1−1=8) and came joint third with Zoltán Almási. The tournament was won by Pendyala Harikrishna. From 10–20 August, at the 3rd Russia–China match in Erguna, Wang scored 5½/10 (+3−2=5) with a 2711 performance. China won the match 51½–48½.

On September 4–9 at the Trophée MULTICOMS China–France Match, he scored 4/6 with a performance rating of 2712, the highest in the competition. On 7 September, at the 7th Lausanne Young Masters, he came second after having lost to Maxime Vachier-Lagrave in the final rapidplay playoff. In October, he came sixth with 8½/13 at the World Junior Championship in Yerevan.

At the Asian Games in Doha in December, the national team won silver, with Wang on board two scoring 6/9 points (+4−1=4) with a 2647 performance.

=== 2007: Becomes a 2700 player ===
In February, Wang came in joint second with 6½/9 at the Aeroflot Open in Moscow. In March, he won both the Calvi Open (6/7) in France and the Cappelle la Grande tournament – which hosted 87 GMs, 81 IMs and 465 FIDE rated players – on tie-break, ahead of five other players with 7/9 points and a performance rating of 2784, achieving his goal of crossing 2700 Elo rating (China's first).

In April, he won the Philippines International Open Chess Championship in Subic Bay Freeport Zone with 7/9 points. In July 2007, he came second with 5/8 at the 4th Sanjin Hotel Cup in Taiyuan. In July at the 4th Taiyuan Scheveningen Event, the Chinese team lost 17–15 against the foreign side; Vadim Zvjaginsev finished 5½/8 to top the score in the event, Wang made 5/8 to top the score for the Chinese team. In 18–31 August at the 4th China–Russia Match in Nizhniy Novgorod, Wang scored 5½/10 (+2−1=7) with a 2714 performance. China won the match overall 52½–47½. In 3–9 September at the UK–China Match in Liverpool, Wang scored 4/6 (+2−0=4) with a 2722 performance. China won the match 28–20.

At the FIDE World Cup in Khanty-Mansiysk, in November, Wang defeated Aleksei Pridorozhni (1½–½), Sergei Tiviakov (2½–1½) and his compatriot Bu Xiangzhi (1½–½), only to be eliminated by Ivan Cheparinov (½–1½) in the fourth round. In December, Wang came second on tiebreak at the Category 17 XVII Ciudad de Pamplona (Magistral A) tournament in Spain having scored 4/7 (TPR 2695). It was won by Francisco Vallejo Pons.

=== 2008: Becomes a Top 20 player ===
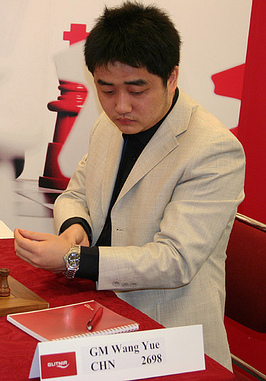
Reykjavík Open, March 2008

In January, at the 15th Asian Team Chess Championship in Visakhapatnam, the national team won gold with Wang scoring on board one 4½/7 points (+3−1=3) with a 2534 performance. In February, he scored 7/10 (+4−0=6) at the Gibraltar Chess Festival Open finishing 20th with a 2653 performance. In March, Wang finished shared first at the Reykjavík Open, together with compatriot Wang Hao (who won on tiebreak) and Hannes Stefánsson.

In his super-tournament debut in April–May 2008 at the 1st FIDE Grand Prix in Baku, he came joint first place with Vugar Gashimov and Magnus Carlsen, scoring 8/13 (+3−0=10) with a performance rating of 2806. Wang called it a "nightmare start" when his planned flight departure from Beijing on the 18th was delayed because of bad weather and did not arrive in Azerbaijan until the early morning of the 21st, thereby missing the opening ceremony as well as having to face the top seed (Magnus Carlsen) with black later on the same day.

In July–August 2008, at the 2nd FIDE Grand Prix in Sochi, he came joint third with Gata Kamsky with 7½/13 (+2−0=11; elo performance 2765) behind winner Levon Aronian and second placed Teimour Radjabov. He was featured on the cover of New in Chess magazine's July 2008 issue. On August 20–30, 2008 in Amsterdam, Wang won the NH Chess Tournament—"Rising Stars" (Wang, Cheparinov, Caruana, L'Ami, Stellwagen) vs. "Experience" (Agdestein, Bareev, Ljubojević, Korchnoi, Jussupow)—with 8½/10 points (+7−0=3; rating performance 2892) remaining undefeated. As the Rising Star winner of the tournament he won an invitation to the March 2009 Amber Blindfold and Rapid Tournament in Nice, and immediately after having won all of his first six games, he was invited by Jeroen van den Berg to Group A of the January 2009 Corus Chess Tournament.

In September 2008, he competed at the 5th Russia–China Match in Ningbo where he scored 3/5 (+1−0=4) with a performance rating of 2767 for the men's team (with Li Chao, Wang Hao, Ni Hua, Bu Xiangzhi). China won the match 26–24.

In November 2008, he played on board one for the Chinese Open team at the 38th Chess Olympiad in Dresden, Germany (6½/10 (+3−0=7) and performance rating 2773). Other team members were Ni Hua, Bu Xiangzhi, Wang Hao and Li Chao. The team came 7th overall. On December 13–29, 2008, at the 3rd FIDE Grand Prix in Elista, Russia – moved from Dohar, Qatar – he came joint fifth-ninth with 6½/12 (+2−2=9).

From March to December 2008, Wang went 82 consecutive games without a loss, one of the longest streaks on record. His unbeaten run began in the second round of the Reykjavík Open and ended during round 1 of the third FIDE Grand Prix 2008–2010 tournament. (See List of tournaments and List of world records in chess.)

=== 2009 ===
In 2009, Wang continued to compete in the FIDE Grand Prix 2008–2010, which was part of the World Chess Championship 2012 cycle. Wang qualified by being one of the four FIDE president nominees, along with Peter Svidler, Ivan Cheparinov, Étienne Bacrot.

On 16 January – 1 February, Wang in his debut at the event, became the second Chinese player to compete at the Group A Corus after Zhang Zhong in 2004, in Wijk aan Zee, Netherlands. He came joint 8th with 6/13 (+2−3=8) and a 2685 performance in the Category 19 (average 2716) event. All of his decisive games were with the white pieces; He lost to Ivanchuk, Adams and Radjabov, and had wins against Morozevich and Carlsen. In Round 2, he blundered early with 9.Na7?? in a what was to be a wild and scrappy game against Ivanchuk in an early deviation of the Queen's Gambit Declined:

Wang–Ivanchuk
1. d4 Nf6 2. c4 e6 3. Nf3 d5 4. Bg5 dxc4 5. Qa4+ Nbd7 6. Nc3 a6 7. g3 b5 8. Nxb5 Rb8 9. Na7?? A unexpected blunder. 9... Rb4 White must have missed this move. 10. Bxf6 gxf6 11. Qa5 Bb7 The knight on a7 is now trapped. 12. Bh3 Qb8 13. Qh5 Ke7?! 13...Rb6 was much safer. 14. d5 Qxa7 14...Bxd5! 15.Qxd5! exd5 16.Nc6+ Kd6 17.Nxb8 Rxb8 leaves Black with a better ending. 15. dxe6 fxe6 16. Bxe6! The black king's cover is broken, and Wang has almost reached equality. 16... Kxe6 17. Qe8+ Be7 18. Qxh8 Nf8 19. Qg8+ Kd7 20. 0-0-0+? This allows the black king to find safety, whereas 20.Qg4+ offered good chances of a perpetual check or 20.Qf7! Qc5 21.Rd1+ Kc6 22.0-0! would have allowed play to go on. 20... Ke8 21. Qg4 Qc5 22. a3 Rxb2! There are no more attacks for White, and Black finishes with a mating net. 23. Kxb2 Qxa3+ 24. Kb1 Qb3+ 25. Ka1 c3 0–1 White resigned.

At the 26th Linares chess tournament (February 18 – March 8) Wang made his debut at the eight-player event and became the first ever Chinese player to participate. Wang finished with +1−2=11 in joint 5th to 7th place on 6½ points with Radjabov and Aronian, 5th on performance rating (2729), and sixth overall on tiebreak. He had his two losses to Grischuk and Anand, and a win over Carlsen.

In 2009, Wang also participated at the 18th Amber Blindfold & Rapid tournament in Nice (March 14–26) in his debut event and as a second Chinese player (after Xie Jun in 1996), 5th M-Tel Masters in Sofia (May 12–23) (Topalov, Carlsen, Ivanchuk, Wang, Dominguez and Shirov) debut event and second Chinese player after Bu Xiangzhi in 2008, 22nd León Rapid León June 4–7, 4 player rapid with Ivanchuk, Morozevich, Carlsen; 20m+10s, the Russia v China match and the Maotai Prince Cup China National Chess King & Queen Championships.

In September Wang won the Chinese Chess King tournament with 5/7 points and a 2797 performance.

Wang made his debut at the 2nd Pearl Spring chess tournament (category 21) in Nanjing. He came third out of six players with 4½/10 (Elo perf=2735); the tournament was won by Magnus Carlsen.

At the FIDE World Cup in Khanty-Mansiysk, in November, Wang was the tenth seed, and defeated Nikolai Kabanov (2–0) and Boris Savchenko (2½–1½) before falling to Étienne Bacrot (1½–3½) in the third round playoff. His loss was notable in that both he and countryman Li Chao were forfeited from their respective playoff games for tardiness, as they were smoking outside the tournament hall and consequently arrived two minutes late for each player's second playoff game, warranting an automatic forfeiture by the FIDE regulations.

=== 2010–2014: Becomes a Top 10 player ===
In January 2010, he became China's first ever top 10 player on the FIDE rankings. From May 9–25, 2010, he participated in the final FIDE Grand Prix in Astrakhan, but failed to qualify for the Candidates Tournament for the World Chess Championship 2012.

Wang won the 11th World University Chess Championship, which took place in Zürich in September 2010.

Wang was the top board of the gold medal-winning Chinese team at the 2014 Chess Olympiad.

=== 2015 ===
In July 2015, Wang won the 6th Hainan Danzhou tournament with a score of 7/9 and a rating performance of 2887.

In October, he played for the Russian team "Siberia" that won the European Chess Club Cup in Skopje. The following month Wang took clear first place in the 5th Chinese Rapid Masters Championship.

=== China Chess League ===
Wang plays for Tianjin chess club in the China Chess League (CCL).

== Playing style ==
Described as a highly technical, consistent and solid player he has a preference for the endgame where he seeks to slowly grind down his opponents with a slight advantage. In February 2009 after Corus finished, Teimour Radjabov was quoted in an interview saying, "[Wang Yue] does not allow his opponents to develop counterplay and he exerts "strangulation" style very effectively." Wang has said his childhood idol was José Raúl Capablanca, and once stated that Kramnik has had an influence on his style of play, having been impressed as a 13-year-old boy with Kramnik's victory over Kasparov in the London 2000 WCC match. Wang has been given the nickname "Panda" by chess columnist Mig Greengard.

=== Openings ===
Wang usually plays 1.d4 as White, and for Black, plays the Sicilian, Berlin or Petroff against e4, and Slav against d4.

== Notable games ==
Wang vs. Ponomariov, 2005

Position: f8 black rook, b7 black pawn, f7 black rook, a6 black pawn, c5 black pawn, d5 white pawn, h5 black pawn, a4 white pawn, c4 white pawn, f4 white pawn, g4 black king, d3 white bishop, g3 white pawn, g2 white king, e1 white rook

Position after 40...R5f7

In 2005, the 17-year-old Wang manages to defeat his first Elo 2700+ opponent, the former FIDE world champion Ruslan Ponomariov:

Wang (2549)–Ponomariov (2700), Moscow Aeroflot Open 2005, Round 6; Modern Defense (A40)
1.d4 g6 2.c4 Bg7 3.e4 c5 4.d5 d6 5.Nc3 e6 6.Nf3 Ne7 7.h3 0-0 8.Bd3 Nd7 9.Bg5 h6 10.Be3 exd5 11.exd5 f5 12.Qc2 Nf6 13.0-0 g5 14.Rae1 Kh8 15.Bd2 Bd7 16.b3 Nh5 17.a4 Ng6 18.Nb5 Bc8 19.Bc3 a6 20.Bxg7+ Kxg7 21.Nc3 Nhf4 22.Ne2 Qf6 23.Nxf4 Nxf4 24.Re3 Bd7 25.Rfe1 Rf7 26.Bf1 g4 27.hxg4 fxg4 28.Nd2 Raf8 29.Ne4 Qg6 30.b4 Bf5 31.bxc5 Bxe4 32.Qxe4 dxc5 33.g3 Qxe4 34.Rxe4 Ng6 35.Rxg4 h5 36.Rg5 Rf5 37.Rxg6+ Kxg6 38.Bd3 Kg5 39.f4+ Kg4 40.Kg2 R5f7 (diagram) 41.Rh1 1–0

== See also ==
- Chess in China

Preceded by Bu Xiangzhi	Men's Chinese Chess Champion; 2005	Succeeded by Ni Hua
