= Zhou Weiqi =

Chinese chess grandmaster (born 1986)

Personal information
- Born: 1 October 1986 (age 39) Changzhou, Jiangsu

Chess career
- Country: China
- Title: Grandmaster (2008)
- FIDE rating: 2600 (July 2026)
- Peak rating: 2646 (July 2015)

Zhou Weiqi (Chinese: 周唯奇; born 1 October 1986) is a Chinese chess player. He was awarded the title of Grandmaster by FIDE in 2008.

== Career ==
Born in Changzhou, Jiangsu Province, Zhou has competed twice (2000, 2002) in the Chinese national team in the World Youth U16 Chess Olympiad with playing record of 19 games (+11, =3, −5).

In the 2008 Aeroflot Open (A2 group), he came second with a performance rating of 2703. In May 2008, he came joint first on points (8/11) and second on tie-break at the 2nd Philippine International Open in Subic Bay Freeport Zone.

At the 79th FIDE congress, held on 16–26 November 2008 in Dresden, Germany, his application for the grandmaster title was approved, making him the 26th grandmaster of China.

He gained his three norms required for the title at:

- 2007 February Aeroflot Open Tournament A2 in Moscow; score 5.5/9
- 2007 June China Men's Individual Championship in Chongqing; score 6.5/11
- 2007 November 2 PGMA Cup Open in Manila; score 7.0/9

He qualified for the Chess World Cup 2009 in Khanty-Mansiysk (20 November – 15 December) by coming equal first at the 8th Asian Continental Chess Championship (2009). He knocked out Emil Sutovsky in the first round to reach round two, where he lost to Gata Kamsky and thus was eliminated from the competition.

He came joint first on 7/9 points (+5=4–0; 2704 performance) and second on tiebreak at the 17th Chigorin Memorial, held from 14 to 25 October 2009 at Holiday Inn Moskovskie Vorota hotel in Saint Petersburg, Russia.

In 2010 Zhou Weiqi won the 7th IGB Dato' Arthur Tan Malaysia Open in Kuala Lumpur. In 2015 he won the Premier section of the Doeberl Cup in Canberra, Australia.

== China Chess League ==
Zhou Weiqi plays for the Jiangsu chess club in the China Chess League (CCL).
