= Bu Xiangzhi =

Chinese chess grandmaster (born 1985)

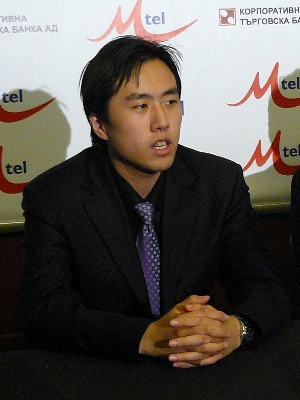

Personal information
- Born: December 10, 1985 (age 40) Qingdao, Shandong, China
- Spouse: Huang Qian (m. 2013)

Chess career
- Country: China
- Title: Grandmaster (1999)
- FIDE rating: 2651 (September 2026)
- Peak rating: 2731 (February 2019)
- Ranking: No. 66 (September 2026)
- Peak ranking: No. 22 (April 2008)

Bu Xiangzhi
- Chinese: 卜祥志
Transcriptions
Standard Mandarin
- Hanyu Pinyin: Bǔ Xiángzhì
- Wade–Giles: Pu Hsiang-chih
- Tongyong Pinyin: Bǔ Siángjhìh
- Yale Romanization: Pǔ Syángjr̀
- IPA: [pù ɕjǎŋʈʂɻ̩̂]
Yue: Cantonese
- Yale Romanization: Búk Cheùhng ji
- Jyutping: Buk1 coeng4 zi3
- IPA: [pŭːk̚ tsʰœːŋ tsi]
Southern Min
- Hokkien POJ: Poh Siông-chì

Bu Xiangzhi (Chinese: 卜祥志; pinyin: Bǔ Xiángzhì; born December 10, 1985) is a Chinese chess player. In 1999, he became the 10th grandmaster from China at the age of 13 years, 10 months and 13 days, at the time the youngest in history. In April 2008, Bu and Ni Hua became the second and third Chinese players to pass the 2700 Elo rating line, after Wang Yue.

Bu was Chinese champion in 2004. He was a member of the gold medal-winning Chinese team at the 2015 World Team Chess Championship and at the 2018 Chess Olympiad. He was the under-14 world champion in 1998 and won the World University Chess Championship twice. His record as the world's youngest grandmaster was broken by Sergey Karjakin in July 2002.

== Career ==
=== Early years ===
Bu was born December 10, 1985, in Qingdao. At age six, Bu was first introduced to chess by an elder cousin (his grandfather was a strong xiangqi player), and his interest grew with his compatriot Xie Jun's women's world championship victory in 1991. He began taking chess seriously at the age of nine years and received early training from then on. During this time, the newspaper Qingdao Daily founded a local chess club which many children in the city went to, including the Qingdao Daily's chief editor's son. His first chess book was a translation of the famous My 60 Memorable Games by Bobby Fischer, a player Bu admires. By 1993, he had already won the Qingdao Junior Chess Championship.

In 1997 this talent became the children's champion of the National S.T. Lee Cup. In 1998 at the age of 12, he captured the titles of national pupil champion and under-14 world champion. In 1999 he finished seventh in the prestigious Tan Chin Nam Grandmaster Invitational Tournament.

=== Youngest grandmaster in history ===
A sponsorship contract with a mineral water producer of his home city Qingdao enabled to him in 1999 with his coach Ji Yunqi to travel to Europe to take part there in several international chess tournaments. In autumn 1999 he achieved within two months the required three norms for the title of Grandmaster (GM), with tournament wins at Paks GM tournament (6/9 points) in 21–29 September, at Kluger Memorial - First Saturday tournament (8 1/2/11 pts) in Budapest in 3–13 October, and coming joint first in the Qingdao Daily Cup (6/8 pts) in 18–23 October. He was 13 years, 10 months, and 13 days old when he scored the final norm, at the time the youngest person to achieve that title. His record as the world’s youngest grandmaster was broken by Sergey Karjakin in July 2002. Adding to his victories in 1999, he won the German Open.

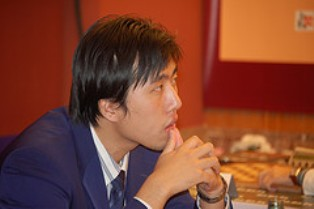
Bu Xiangzhi at the 2007 Blindfold Chess World Cup in Bilbao

=== 2000-2007 ===
In 2000 in Germany he won in his first appearance the International Neckar Open in Deizisau. Also in 2000, Bu defeated the Azerbaijani talent Teimour Radjabov 6 1/2-1½ in an eight-game Future World Champions Match competition in New York. They played two games a day at a time control of one hour for all the moves. The margin of victory was a little flattering to Bu with Radjabov missing a number of good chances on the first day and then having a bit of a disaster on day two losing both games. Radjabov had beaten Bu in the two game final of a Cadet's event held earlier in the year on the Kasparovchess.com site. In May 2000, Bu made his first appearance in a United States Chess Federation-rated tournament at the New York Open in New York City. Although one of the favorites to win the tournament, he lost in the first round to American life master Shearwood McClelland III in an upset, before rallying to finish with 5 1/2/9.

In December 2003, Bu won the 10th Aceimar International Open in Mondariz with 7 1/2/9.

In November 2004, he became National Chess Champion of China in Lanzhou with a score of 9/11.

In 2006 Bu won the 9th World University Chess Championship in Lagos, Nigeria on tiebreak over Ni Hua, after they both scored 7 1/2 /9.

In July 2007, Bu won the Canadian Open Chess Championship in Ottawa, Ontario, Canada. In October 2007, he won the Blindfold Chess World Cup in Bilbao by a 1 1/2 point margin, defeating strong Grandmasters Veselin Topalov, Magnus Carlsen, Pentala Harikrishna, Judit Polgár and Sergey Karjakin in the process.

=== 2008 ===
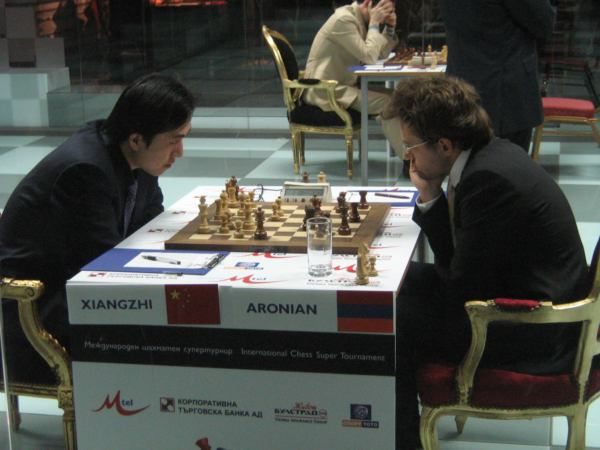
Bu Xiangzhi (left) vs Levon Aronian at Mtel Masters 2008, Sofia

In January 2008, at the 6th Gibtelecom Chess Festival in Gibraltar, Bu came joint first scoring 8/10 (+7−1=2; Elo performance 2834) but lost on the two game blitz play-off tie-break to Hikaru Nakamura. In April 2008, Bu competed at the Russian Team Championships in Dagomys, Sochi for the team Shatar-Metropole (Buryatia), where he achieved a score of 6 1/2/10 (+3−0=7) and a performance rating of 2771. In his super-tournament debut in Sofia, Bulgaria at the Grand Slam M-Tel Masters (category 20) tournament on May 7–18, 2008, he came fifth out of six players (Levon Aronian, Ivan Cheparinov, Vassily Ivanchuk, Teimour Radjabov, Veselin Topalov) having scored 3/10 (+1−5=4; Elo performance 2594).

He competed at the Inventi Grandmaster Tournament in Antwerp, Belgium on 23–31 August 2008. He won the tournament with a score of 7/9 (+5−0=4) and a performance rating of 2748.

In September 2008, he competed at the 5th Russia v China Match in Ningbo where he scored 2 1/2/5 with a performance rating of 2707 for the men's team (with Wang Yue, Wang Hao, Ni Hua, Li Chao).

In October Bu won the men's rapid individual tournament of the 2008 World Mind Sports Games.

In December 2008, he came third out of six at the Pearl Spring chess tournament in Nanjing with 5/10.

=== 2010 ===
He scored 6 1/2/9 (+4−0=5) at the Moscow Open in January with a 2723 performance.

Bu Xiangzhi scored 5 1/2 (+3−1=5) at the 2010 Aeroflot Open finishing in 10th place out of 80 players with a 2700 performance. Following this tournament, he scored 13.0/18 in the Preliminaries of the 2010 World Blitz Championship Preliminaries on February 18 to finish in second place behind Maxime Vachier-Lagrave; the result automatically qualified Bu for the 2010 World Blitz Championship to be held in Moscow in November 2010.

From May 24 through June 4, 2010, Bu participated in the Chinese Chess Championship. In clear first after ten rounds, Bu needed a final round victory to secure his second Chinese chess championship. However, he drew his final round, allowing Wang Hao and Zhou Jianchao to catch him with 7 1/2/11; Wang won the championship on tiebreak.

Bu participated in the 1st Danzhou Tournament in China from June 11 through June 20. After a victory over Zhou Jianchao, Bu led the tournament with 5 1/2/8 with one round remaining. A final round draw with Hou Yifan allowed Li Chao to catch him with 6/9, but Bu won the tournament on tiebreak with a performance rating of 2740.

From August 4 through August 15, Bu participated in the 7th annual China versus Russia match, held in Yinzhou, Ningbo, China. Teamed with Wang Hao, Wang Yue, Zhou Jianchao and Ni Hua, Bu led the Chinese team to victory with 4/5 and a 2928 performance rating.

=== 2012-present ===
In June 2012, Bu won the 3rd Hainan Danzhou GM tournament on tiebreak over Ni Hua and this victory earned him the last spot in the Chinese team for the Istanbul Chess Olympiad. In August 2012, he won for the second time the World University Chess Championship, held in Guimarães, Portugal, with 8/9 (+7−0=2).

In July 2014, he first tied for first with Ding Liren, placing second on tiebreak, in the 5th Hainan Danzhou tournament and then won the Politiken Cup in Helsingør, Denmark with 9/10, a full point ahead of the field. Bu won the match against the world champion Magnus Carlsen in the FIDE World Cup 2017 in the third round and eliminated him from the tournament.

In July 2023, he won the 42nd Benasque Open on tiebreak over Fernando Peralta and Kirill Alekseenko with a score of 8.5/10. In the same month he also won the Masters Open Tournament of the 2023 Biel Chess Festival.

In March 2024, he won the strong Shenzhen Masters event with 4.5/7, earning notable victories against Arjun Erigaisi and Anish Giri.

== National team ==
Bu has played regularly since 2001 in the Chinese national team. With the World Team Chess Championship in 2005 in Beersheba, and with the Turin 2006 Chess Olympiad he achieved on the top board very good results and won individual and team silvers in each event. He played first board in Turin, where the Chinese team finished in second place. He won four games and drew eight, including his games against top Grandmasters Vladimir Kramnik, Viswanathan Anand and Levon Aronian. He has played in two previous Chess Olympiads in 2002 and 2004, both on board four.

He was part of the team that won silver at the December 2006 Asian Games in Doha. He won an individual bronze medal on board two as the team won gold at the 2008 15th Asian Team Chess Championship in Visakhapatnam.

Bu was part of the Chinese team that won the gold medal in the World Team Chess Championship in 2015. He was also in the team that won the 43rd Chess Olympiad in 2018; in this event, Bu also won the individual bronze medal on board four.

== China Chess League ==
Bu Xiangzhi plays for Shandong chess club in the China Chess League (CCL).

== Personal life ==
Bu Xiangzhi is married to Huang Qian, also a chess player and Woman Grandmaster.

== Notable chess games ==
- Bu Xiangzhi vs Krishnan Sasikiran, VI Ciudad de Dos Hermanas Internet 2005, Gruenfeld Defense: Exchange Variation, Nadanian Attack (D85), 1-0
- Baadur Jobava vs Bu Xiangzhi, 37th Chess Olympiad 2006, Slav Defense: Chameleon Variation, Advance System (D15), 0-1
- Bu Xiangzhi vs Judit Polgar, Biel Chess Festival 2007, English Opening: Symmetrical, Four Knights Variation (D41), 1-0
- Bu Xiangzhi vs Veselin Topalov, M-Tel Masters 2008, Queen Pawn Game: Symmetrical Variation (D02), 1-0
- Magnus Carlsen vs Bu Xiangzhi, World Cup (2017) Tbilisi GEO, Italian Game: Two Knights Defense, 0-1

== See also ==
- Chess in China
- Chess prodigy § List of youngest grandmasters

Preceded by Zhang Zhong	Men's Chinese Chess Champion; 2004	Succeeded by Wang Yue
Achievements
Preceded by Ruslan Ponomariov	Youngest chess grandmaster ever 1999–2002	Succeeded by Sergey Karjakin
