= Liang Chong =

Chinese chess grandmaster (born 1980)

Personal information
- Born: January 29, 1980 (age 46) Guangzhou, Guangdong, China

Chess career
- Country: China
- Title: Grandmaster (2004)
- FIDE rating: 2489 (July 2026)
- Peak rating: 2588 (October 2000)

Liang Chong (Chinese: 梁充; born January 29, 1980, in Guangzhou, Guangdong) is a Chinese chess Grandmaster.

In 2004, he became China's 16th Grandmaster.

== Grandmaster title ==
Chong gained the GM title in July 2004.

He achieved his first GM norm at the 3rd S.T. Lee Cup Open Tournament in September 1996 scoring 6/10. His second GM norm wasn't achieved until another 5 years in April 2001 at the World Championship Zonal 3.3 in Handan with a score 8/13. His third norm was achieved in September 2003 at the Chinese Team Chess Championship in Tianjin with a score of 6.5/10.

== National team ==
He participated for the China national chess team at the 34th Chess Olympiad (2000) with an overall record of 3 games played (+1, =1, -1); one World Men's Team Chess Championship (2005) with an overall record of 1 game played (+1, =0, -0); and one Men's Asian Team Chess Championships (1999) with an overall record of 5 games played (+2, =2, -1) for the China B team.

== World Championship ==
In 1999 he managed to qualify for the FIDE World Chess Championship Knockout Tournament in Las Vegas, but was beaten in the first round by Goran Dizdar. At the 2001-2 WCC Knockout Tournament in Moscow, he was again defeated in the first round (by Alexander Motylev).

== University ==
In March 2008 he competed at the 10th World University Chess Championship tournament in Novokuznetsk where he came 8th.

== China Chess League ==
Liang Chong plays for China Mobile Group Chongqing Company Ltd chess club in the China Chess League (CCL).

== See also ==
- Chess in China
