= Wang Rui (chess player) =

Chinese chess grandmaster (born 1978)

Personal information
- Born: April 18, 1978 (age 48) Hebei, China

Chess career
- Country: China
- Title: Grandmaster (2009)
- Peak rating: 2526 (July 2000)

Wang Rui (Chinese: 王锐; born April 18, 1978, in Hebei Province) is a Chinese chess Grandmaster.

== National team ==
Wang has competed in the China national chess team in the Chess Olympiad once at the 33rd Chess Olympiad in 1998 (games played 3: +2, =0, -1), and once for the China "B" team at the Asian Team Chess Championships (1999) (games played 4: +1, =1, -2).

== GM title ==
He gained his three GM norms to become China's 28th grandmaster:

- (Oct 2005) World Championship Zonal 3.5 China in Beijing; score 7.0/9
- (Nov 2006) 1st Gloria Macapagal Arroyo Cup Int Open in Manila; score 6.5/9
- (Dec 2008) KL Open Chess Championship in Kuala Lumpur; score 7.0/9

== China Chess League ==
Wang Rui plays for Hebei chess club in the China Chess League (CCL).

== See also ==
- Chess in China
