= Ning Chunhong =

Chinese chess player

Personal information
- Born: January 21, 1968 (age 58)

Chess career
- Country: China
- Title: Woman Grandmaster (2001)
- Peak rating: 2406 (October 2001)

Ning Chunhong (Chinese: 宁春红; born January 21, 1968) is a Chinese chess player holding the title of Woman Grandmaster (WGM). She was in the Top 50 Women rating list from October 2001 to 2002.

In 1992 she won the women's section of the World University Chess Championship in Antwerp, Belgium. She was awarded the title of FIDE Arbiter in 2008.

Ning plays for Tianjin chess club in the China Chess League (CCL).

== See also ==
- Chess in China
