= Lin Ta =

Chinese chess player (born 1963)

Personal information
- Born: January 31, 1963 (age 63)

Chess career
- Country: China
- Title: International Master (1990)
- FIDE rating: 2372 (October 2007)
- Peak rating: 2463 (July 2003)

Lin Ta (Chinese: 林塔; born 31 January 1963) is a Chinese International Master chess player.

He was a member of the Chinese national chess team, he was also a member of the national team at the Chess Olympiad four times in 1984-1990. Lin played a total of 28 games scoring 13 wins, 9 draws and 6 losses.

Lin competed twice at the World Men's Team Chess Championship (1985–1989) having played a total 10 games (2 wins, 6 draws, 2 losses); and once at the Asian Men's Team Chess Championship (1987) having played 7 games (5 wins, 2 draws, 0 losses).

His current (inactive) ELO rating is 2372 according to FIDE.

== See also ==
- Chess in China
