= Xiu Deshun =

Chinese chess grandmaster

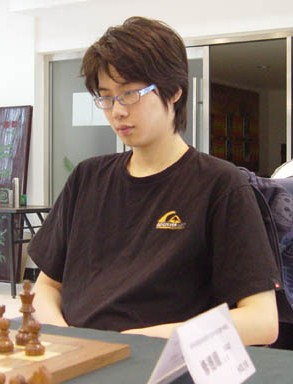

Personal information
- Born: 1 February 1989 (age 37) Qingdao, Shandong Province

Chess career
- Country: China
- Title: Grandmaster (2011)
- FIDE rating: 2509 (July 2026)
- Peak rating: 2585 (September 2013)

Xiu Deshun (Chinese: 修德顺; Pinyin: Xiū Déshùn; born 1 February 1989, in Qingdao) is a Chinese chess grandmaster.

== Career ==
Xiu was a member of the gold medal-winning Chinese team at the Asian Nations Cup 2014 in Tabriz, Iran, where he also won the individual gold medal on the reserve board (board 5). Xiu played for the Chinese team also in the World Youth U16 Chess Olympiad of 2004, winning the team gold medal.

He won the Thailand Open Chess Championship (also known as Bangkok Chess Club Open) in 2008 and 2009, and the IGB Dato' Arthur Tan Malaysia Open in 2013.

Xiu plays for Qingdao Yucai chess club in the China Chess League (CCL).
