= Liu Shilan =

Chinese chess player

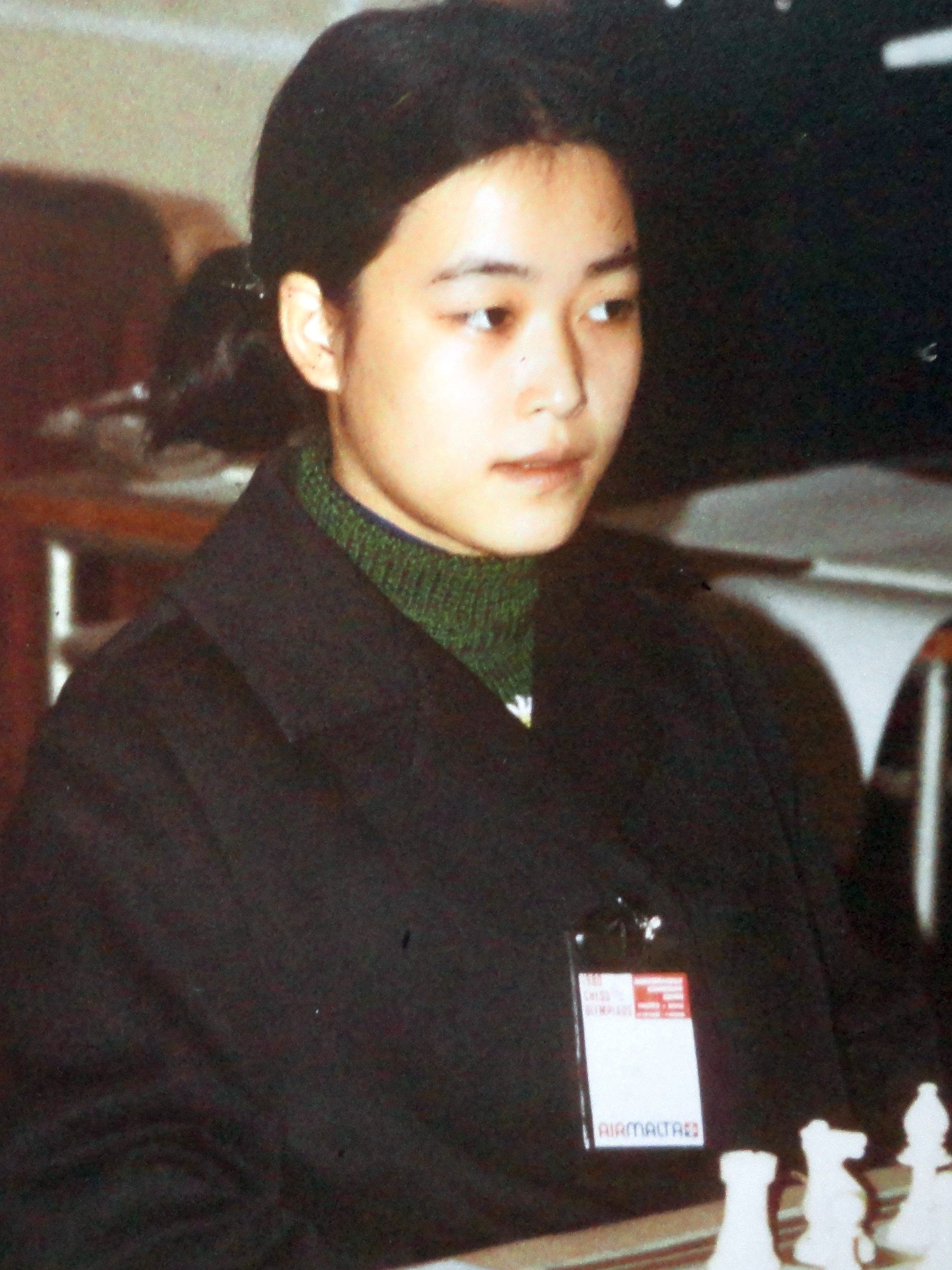
- Liu Shilan, Malta 1980

Personal information
- Born: January 24, 1962 (age 64) Chengdu, Sichuan, China

Chess career
- Country: China
- Title: Woman Grandmaster (1982)
- FIDE rating: 2083 [inactive]
- Peak rating: 2335 (July 1987)

Liu Shilan (Chinese: 刘适兰; born January 24, 1962) is a Chinese chess player who holds the title Woman Grandmaster, which she received in 1982 from FIDE. She has been the national women's champion of China seven times (1979–81, 1983-6).

== Chess career ==
Liu learned to play chess at 12 years old in a chess school in Chengdu, Sichuan. In 1982, Liu came third at the Women's Interzonal tournament in Tbilisi with a final score of 9 points out of 14. Thanks to this result, she became the first player from Asia to qualify for the Women's World Championship Candidates' matches and to achieve the title Woman Grandmaster (WGM).

At the Candidates' stage, Liu lost her quarterfinal match, held in 1983 in Velden, to Nana Ioseliani by 6–3 (+1, =4, -4). Later, she competed in two further Women's Interzonal tournaments (1985 Zeleznovodsk, finishing 14th with 4½/15; and 1987 Tuzla, finishing 10th with 8½/17.)

Liu competed for the Chinese national team at the Women's Chess Olympiad five times (1980–1988), with an overall record of 68 total games played (+25, =27, -16). She had the second best performance rating and won a bronze medal for first board at the 27th Chess Olympiad in Dubai, 1986.

== See also ==
- Chess in China

Preceded by None	Women's Chinese Chess Champion; 1979, 1980, 1981	Succeeded by Zhao Lan
Preceded by Zhao Lan	Women's Chinese Chess Champion; 1983, 1984, 1985, 1986	Succeeded by Peng Zhaoqin
