= Li Chao (chess player) =

Chinese chess grandmaster (born 1989)

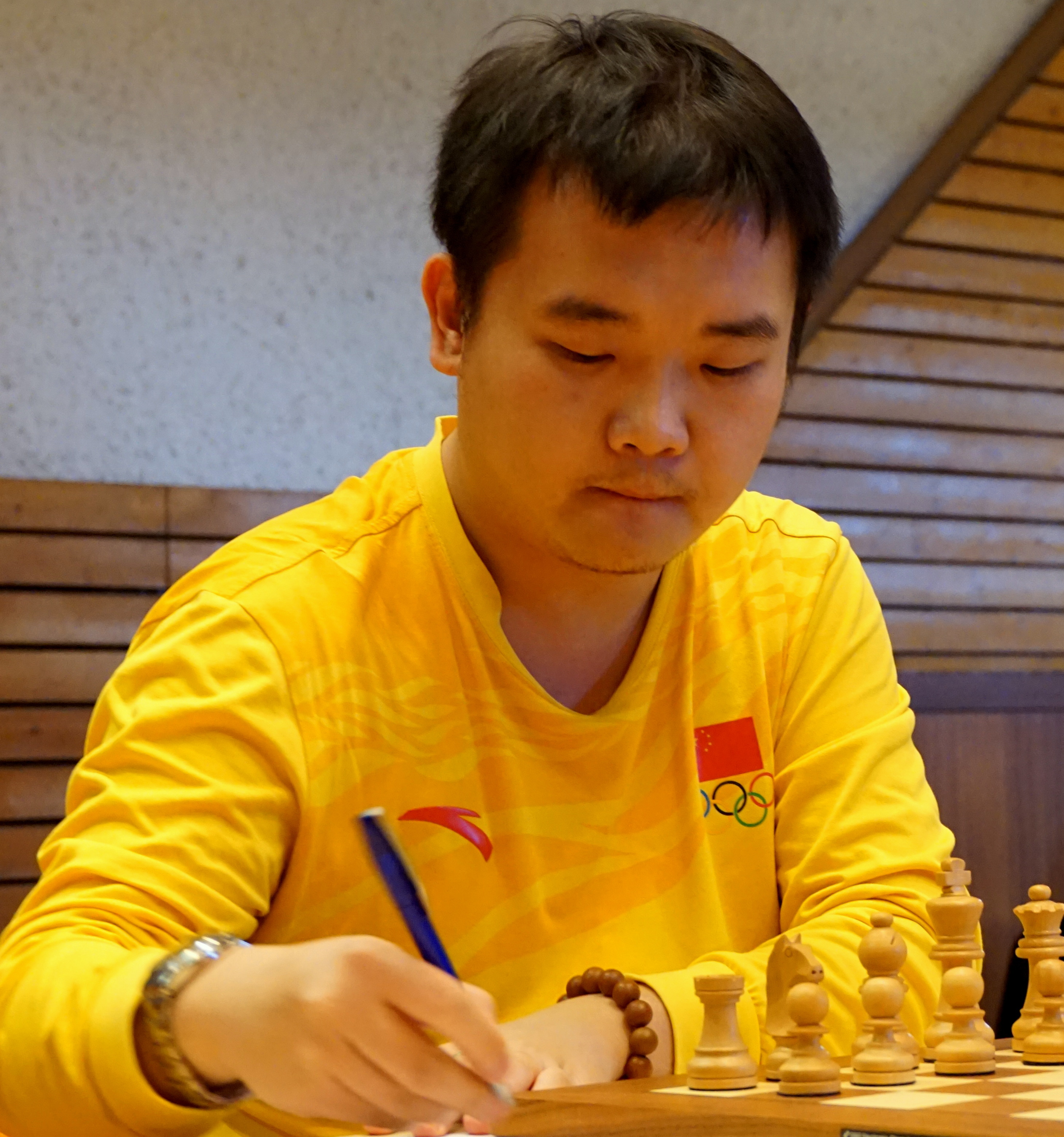
- Li Chao in 2015

Personal information
- Born: 21 April 1989 (age 37) Taiyuan, Shanxi

Chess career
- Country: China
- Title: Grandmaster (2007)
- FIDE rating: 2625 (July 2026)
- Peak rating: 2758 (June 2016)
- Peak ranking: No. 14 (August 2015)

Li Chao (Chinese: 李超; pinyin: Lǐ Chāo; born 21 April 1989 in Taiyuan, Shanxi) is a Chinese chess Grandmaster and Asian champion in 2013. In 2007, he became China's 23rd Grandmaster at the age of 18.

He has been a second/assistant for fellow Chinese chess Grandmaster Wang Yue on several occasions; the two are good friends having known each other since they were children.

In chess circles he is sometimes known as "Li Chao b" since there is another Chinese chess player named Li Chao.

== Career ==
Li Chao started to play chess at the age of six.

In 2005 he finished sixth at the World Junior Chess Championship held in Istanbul. In August 2007, Li won the Scandinavian Chess Tournament in Täby, Sweden with 8½ points out of 9. In September 2007, he won the fourth IGB Dato' Arthur Tan Malaysia Open in Kuala Lumpur. He won the President Gloria Macapagal Arroyo Cup in Manila held on 21–29 November 2007.

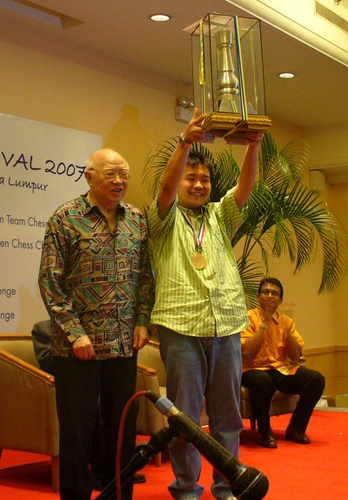
Li Chao (right) winning the fourth Dato' Arthur Tan Open in 2007, standing next to Dato' Tan Chin Nam (left)

In 2007, he was awarded the Grandmaster title. His GM norms were achieved at:

- 2005 World Junior Chess Championship in Istanbul; score 8.5/13;
- Aeroflot Open 2007, A1 Group tournament in Moscow; score 4.5/9;
- Lake Sevan round-robin tournament (category 12) in Martuni, Armenia, where he scored 5.5/9, thus finishing joint first with Yuri Vovk and G.N. Gopal.

In April 2008, he came equal first with 7/9 points and fourth on tie-break at the tenth Dubai Open. In May 2008, he came joint first on points (8.0/11) and first on tie-break at the second Philippine International Open in Subic Bay Freeport Zone. In August 2008, he won the fifth IGB Dato' Arthur Tan Malaysia Open with 9/11. In the following month, he competed at the fifth Russia v China Match in Ningbo where he scored 3/5 with a performance rating of 2767 for the men's team (with Wang Yue, Wang Hao, Ni Hua, Bu Xiangzhi).

In the Chess World Cup 2009, held in Khanty-Mansiysk, Russia, he reached the third round losing to Vugar Gashimov, after he didn't show up in time at the second game of the rapid tiebreaks, as he was smoking, and was forfeited.

In 2010, Li Chao won the Corus C tournament at Wijk aan Zee (15 January - 31 January) scoring 10/13. The victory qualified him for the 2011 Corus Group B, later renamed Tata Steel Chess Tournament Group B. A few months later, in April 2010, he convincingly won the 48th Doeberl Cup held in Canberra, Australia. Li won this latter event again in 2013.

At the 2011 Tata Steel B tournament he scored 6/13, placing ninth. Li won the men's individual chess tournament of the 2011 Summer Universiade in Shenzhen with a score of 8.5/9, two points ahead of the field, including compatriots Wang Hao and Wang Yue. In October 2011, he won the Indonesia Open Chess Championship in Jakarta on tiebreak over Ganguly Surya Shekhar. Li took part in the Chess World Cup 2011, where he was eliminated in the first round by Nguyen Ngoc Truong Son.

He tied for first with Yu Yangyi at the 2nd Indonesia Open Chess Championship in 2012, but placed second on tiebreak. In January 2013 Li Chao won the Boston Chess Congress and the 4th Annual Golden State Open in Concord, California. In May 2013, he won the Asian Chess Championship, which took place in Manila, and this achievement earned him the qualification for the Chess World Cup 2013. In the latter he defeated Evgeny Postny in the inaugural round to reach the second one, losing to Anish Giri. In 2014, he won the Reykjavik Open with 8.5/10.

In March 2015, he won the 31st Cappelle-la-Grande Open. This success was followed by the victory at the 19th Neckar Open in Deizisau with a score of 8.5/9. In August 2015, he played a six-game match with Hungarian Grandmaster Peter Leko in Szeged, Hungary. He won the match by 4-2 (+2-0=4). Li played for the team "Siberia" (alongside Vladimir Kramnik, Levon Aronian, Alexander Grischuk, Wang Yue, Anton Korobov, Dmitry Kokarev and Dmitry Bocharov) which won the 2015 European Club Cup in Skopje. In February 2016, he won the Graz Open with 8/9.

== China Chess League ==
Li Chao played for Beijing chess club in the China Chess League. In August 2015, Grandmaster Ian Rogers reported that Li Chao had been banned for more than a year from all Chinese teams and tournaments, resulting from a dispute with a sponsor of a Beijing club.

== Notable games ==
- Li Chao vs Wang Hao, World Junior Championship 2006, Scandinavian Defense: Panov Transfer (B01), 1-0
- Li Chao vs Evgeny Alekseev, Russia vs China Match 2008, Spanish Game: Berlin Defense, l'Hermet Variation Berlin Wall Defense (C67), 1-0
- Tu Hoang Thong vs Li Chao, 2008 Olympiad 2008, Queen's Pawn Game (A45), 0-1

== See also ==
- Chess in China
