= Gao Rui =

Chinese chess grandmaster (born 1992)

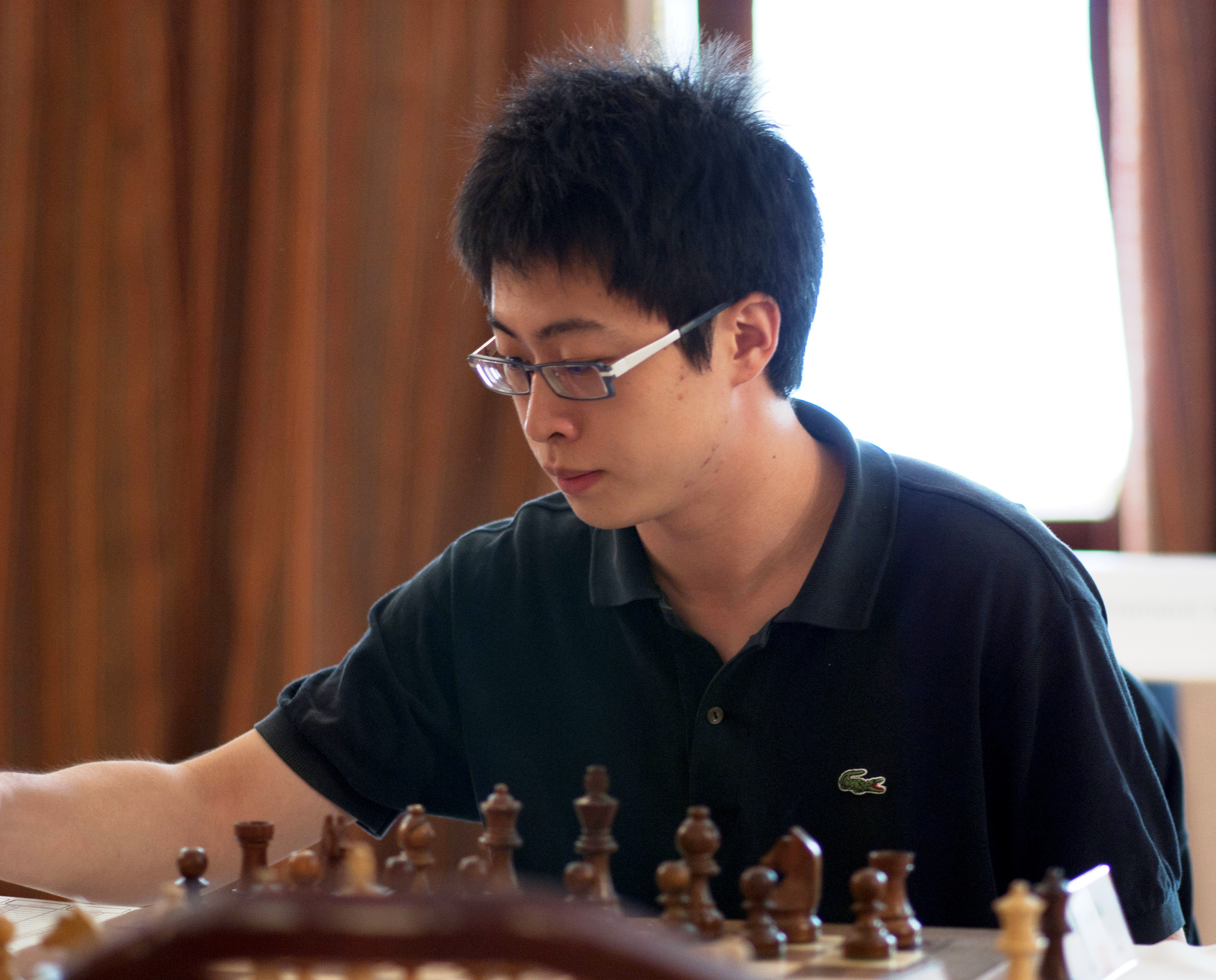
- Gao in 2012

Personal information
- Born: May 20, 1992 (age 34) Qingdao, Shandong

Chess career
- Country: China
- Title: Grandmaster (2013)
- FIDE rating: 2534 (July 2026)
- Peak rating: 2568 (May 2018)

Gao Rui (Chinese: 高睿; pinyin: Gāo Ruì; born 20 May 1992 in Qingdao) is a Chinese chess grandmaster. He was awarded the FIDE titles of International Master in 2009 and Grandmaster in 2013.

He won the First Saturday IM tournaments of May and June 2008 in Budapest. In 2015, Gao won the Best Newcomer Award, jointly with Koswate. K.R.C.T. from Sri Lanka, at the 1st Asian University Chess Championship in Beijing.
