= Jilin Zhang =

Chinese-Australian chess player (born 1986)

Personal information
- Born: 24 June 1986 (age 40) Harbin, Heilongjiang

Chess career
- Country: China (until 2017); Australia (since 2017)
- Title: Woman Grandmaster (2007)
- Peak rating: 2361 (April 2008)

Jilin Zhang
- Traditional Chinese: 張繼林
- Simplified Chinese: 张继林
Transcriptions
Standard Mandarin
- Hanyu Pinyin: Zhāng Jìlín
- Wade–Giles: Chang Chi-Lin
- Tongyong Pinyin: Jhāng Jìlín
- Yale Romanization: Jāng Jìlín
- IPA: [ʈʂáŋ tɕîlǐn]
Yue: Cantonese
- Yale Romanization: Cheūng Gai Làhm
- Jyutping: Zoeng1 Gai3 Lam4
- IPA: [tsœ́ŋ kɐ̄i lɐ̏m]
Southern Min
- Hokkien POJ: Tiuⁿ Kè-Nâ

Jilin Zhang (simplified Chinese: 张继林; traditional Chinese: 張繼林; pinyin: Zhāng Jìlín; born 24 June 1986) is a Chinese and Australian chess player holding the title of Woman Grandmaster (WGM). She competed in the Women's World Chess Championship in 2008.

== Career ==
Jilin Zhang first represented China in the World Youth Chess Festival in Menorca in 1996. She played then three times subsequently at the World Girls U-20 Championship in 2004, 2005 and 2006, finishing in the top ten on all three occasions.

In June 2007, she qualified for the Woman Grandmaster title. She earned the required norms at:

- 2002 China Women's Team Championship in Beihai, China (5–17 February); score 7/9
- 2006 World Junior Chess Championship (Girls) in Yerevan, Armenia (3–16 October 2006); score 7/11
- 3rd Singapore Masters International Open in Singapore (26–30 December 2006); score 5/9

In 2008 Zhang qualified from the Chinese Zonal tournament to play in the Women's World Chess Championship in Nalchik, Russia. She was knocked out in the first round by Inna Gaponenko.

In the China Chess League, Zhang played for the Shandong team, which won the gold medal in 2007 and 2010.

She was awarded the International Arbiter title in 2010. Zhang moved with her family to Sydney in 2016 and in August 2017, Zhang switched her national federation from China to Australia.

In 2018 Zhang was selected to play for the Australian team at the Batumi Chess Olympiad on third board.
