= Yu Ruiyuan =

Chinese chess player

Personal information
- Born: September 13, 1991 (age 34) Guangdong, China

Chess career
- Country: China
- Title: Grandmaster (2012)
- FIDE rating: 2480 (July 2026)
- Peak rating: 2571 (January 2015)

Yu Ruiyuan (Chinese: 余瑞源; born September 13, 1991) is a Chinese chess player. Born in Guangdong, he was awarded the title Grandmaster by FIDE in 2012. In 2006, he played on board 2 for the bronze medal-winning Chinese team at the World Youth Under-16 Chess Olympiad. In 2015, Yu won the bronze medal at the 1st Asian University Chess Championship in Beijing.
