= Ni Hua =

Chinese chess grandmaster (born 1983)

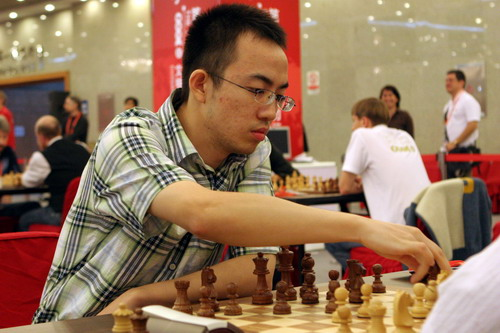
- World Mind Sports Games, 2008

Personal information
- Born: May 31, 1983 (age 43) Shanghai, China

Chess career
- Country: China
- Title: Grandmaster (2003)
- FIDE rating: 2649 (October 2026)
- Peak rating: 2724 (April 2009)
- Peak ranking: No. 21 (April 2009)

Ni Hua
- Simplified Chinese: 倪华
- Traditional Chinese: 倪華
Transcriptions
Standard Mandarin
- Hanyu Pinyin: Ní Huá
- IPA: [nǐ xwǎ]

Ni Hua (Chinese: 倪华; born May 31, 1983 in Shanghai) is a Chinese chess grandmaster and the national team captain. He is three-time national champion. In 2003, he became China's 15th Grandmaster at the age of 19. In April 2008, Ni Hua and Bu Xiangzhi both became the second and third Chinese players to pass the 2700 Elo rating mark, after Wang Yue.

He was a member of the gold medal-winning Chinese team at the 41st Chess Olympiad.

== Career ==
Ni learned to play chess at six. He won the S.T. Lee Cup for under 14 year-olds in 1996 and 1997 and repeated the performance in a higher age group in 1999.

In 2000 he played in his first Olympiad in Istanbul, where he scored 5.5/9. In February 2000, he gained his first GM norm at the 1st Saturday GM Tournament in Budapest with 7/10 score. He achieved his second GM norm at the April 2001 China Team Championship in Suzhou with a score of 6.5/10. His third GM norm was achieved at the Tan Chin Nam Cup with a score of 6.5/9 in Qingdao in July 2002. In the 2001 China-USA Summit Match, Ni Hua scored notable victories against Dmitry Schneider and Hikaru Nakamura.

Ni was awarded the Grandmaster title in February 2003.

In August 2004, Ni won the 1st Dato’ Arthur Tan Malaysian Open in Kuala Lumpur. In the FIDE World Chess Championship 2004 he beat Evgeny Vladimirov in round one, but was put out by his compatriot Ye Jiangchuan in the second round.

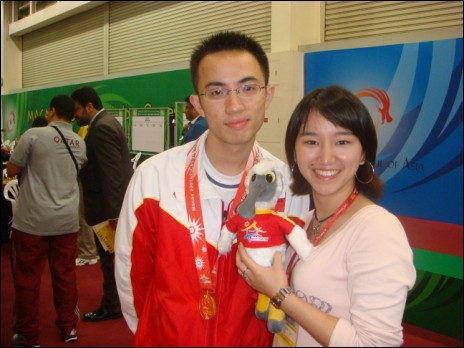
Ni Hua (left) at the Macau 2nd Asian Indoor Games

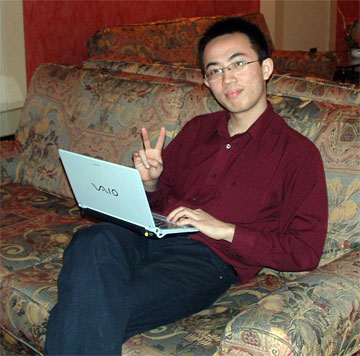
Reggio Emilia chess tournament, 2009

In November 2005, the Chinese national team just needed one point to win the championship in the World Team Chess Championship in Beersheba, Israel, but Ni Hua's two endgame losses (to Karen Asrian of Armenia and Alexander Morozevich of Russia) in the final two rounds allowed Russia to clinch victory. Later that month, he competed in the Chess World Cup 2005, where he was knocked out in the first round by Vasilios Kotronias.

In the 37th Chess Olympiad, Ni scored 5.5/9 on fifth board helping the Chinese team to win the silver medal, China's first medal ever at men's Chess Olympiads. In September 2006, he finished equal first along with Bu Xiangzhi in the World University Championship, but placed second on countback.

Ni won the Chinese Chess Championship consecutively in 2006 and 2007. In December 2007, he won the Prospero Pichay Cup in Manila with a score of 7.0/9.

In April 2008, Ni competed at the Russian Team Championships in Dagomys, Sochi for the team Economist-SGSEU-1 (Saratov), where he achieved a score of 7.0/11 (+4=6–1) and a performance rating of 2735. In June 2008, he became the Chinese National Champion for the third time in a row with 7.5/11 points and a performance of 2666.

In early September 2008, he competed for team Mérida Patrimonio on board three at the Division 2 – CECLUB Spanish Club Chess Championship. His team mates were Dmitry Jakovenko, Pavel Eljanov, Zoltán Almási, Ibragim Khamrakulov and Miguel Llanes Hurtado. Ni Hua scored 4.0/5 (+3 =2 -0) and his team topped the group. In late September 2008, he competed at the 5th Russia v China Match in Ningbo, where he scored 2.5/5 with a performance rating of 2700 for the men's team (with Wang Yue, Wang Hao, Bu Xiangzhi, Li Chao).

In January 2009, he won the 51st Reggio Emilia chess tournament, becoming the first Chinese player ever to win this event. In 2009, he made appearances at the Canada Open, 4th Kolkata Open, Russia v China match, Chinese National Championships, the Maotai Prince Cup China National Chess King & Queen Championships and the European Club Cup for the champions Economist Saratov.

In April 2010 he won the Asian Chess Championship in Subic Bay. This achievement earned him the qualification to the Chess World Cup 2011, where he was knocked out in the second round by Ruslan Ponomariov.

In March 2012, Ni Hua came first in the 2nd HDBank Cup tournament in Ho Chi Minh City. In the subsequent month, he won the 14th Dubai Open scoring 7/9 and edging out on tiebreak Baadur Jobava, Mikheil Mchedlishvili, Normunds Miezis and Sandipan Chanda. In June of that year, he tied for first with Bu Xiangzhi in the 3rd Hainan Danzhou tournament after both scored 6/9, and finished second on tiebreak.

In May 2013, he tied for second place with Bu Xiangzhi in the 4th Hainan Danzhou tournament and finished third on countback. In August 2013, Ni won the 3rd Chinese Rapid Chess Championship in Shenzhen.

In July 2014, he won the 22nd Montcada Open. In the 2014 Chess Olympiad in Tromsø, he contributed to China's historic victory scoring 6.5/9 on board four and his rating performance of 2723 earned him the individual bronze medal on board four. In November 2014, he helped the Chinese team to win the Scheveningen-style match against the Romanian olympic team at the 8th King's Tournament in Mediaș.

In January 2015, Ni won the Australian Open with 8.5/9, 1.5 points ahead of the field. He took part in the Chess World Cup 2015, where he was knocked out in the first round by Argentine GM Sandro Mareco.

== China Chess League ==
Ni Hua plays for Shanghai chess club in the China Chess League (CCL).

== Notable chess games ==
- Nigel Short vs Ni Hua, International Kings Challenge 2003, Sicilian Defense: Lasker-Pelikan Variation, General (B33), 0-1
- Ni Hua vs Mikhael Mchedlishvili, World Team Championship 2005, Nimzo-Indian Defense: Saemisch, Capablanca Variation (E29), 1-0
- Ni Hua vs Peter Svidler, Russia vs China Match 2008, Sicilian Defense: Canal Attack (B51), 1-0
- Ni Hua vs Sergei Tiviakov, Torneo di Capodanno 2008, Scandinavian Defense: Gubinsky-Melts Defense (B01), 1-0

== See also ==
- Chess in China

Preceded by Wang Yue	Chinese Chess Champion; 2006, 2007, 2008	Succeeded by Ding Liren
