= Wang Hao (chess player) =

Chinese chess grandmaster (born 1989)

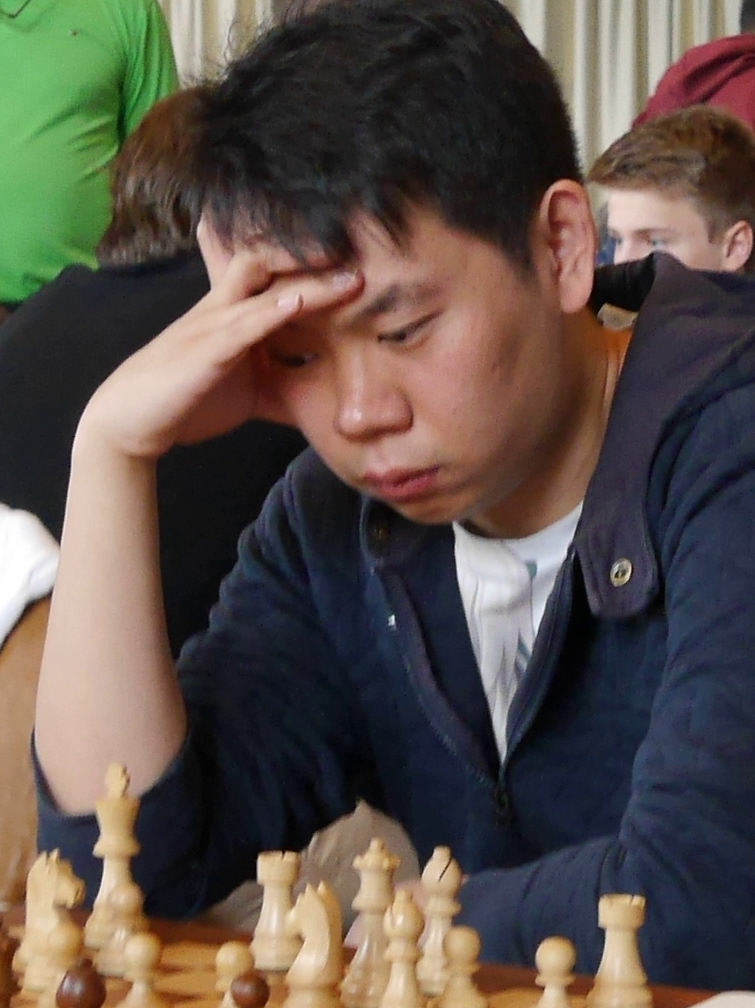
- Wang Hao in 2018

Personal information
- Born: August 4, 1989 (age 36) Harbin, Heilongjiang, China

Chess career
- Country: China
- Title: Grandmaster (2005)
- FIDE rating: 2684 (July 2026)
- Peak rating: 2763 (April 2020)
- Ranking: No. 40 (July 2026)
- Peak ranking: No. 12 (January 2020)

Wang Hao (Chinese: 王皓; pinyin: Wáng Hào; born August 4, 1989) is a Chinese chess grandmaster. In November 2009, Wang became the fourth Chinese player to break through the 2700 Elo rating mark.

In 2019, Wang qualified for the 2020 Candidates Tournament by winning the FIDE Grand Swiss Tournament 2019, making him the second Chinese player to qualify for a Candidates Tournament. He announced his retirement from professional chess at the end of the Candidates tournament in 2021, citing health issues. However, he returned to playing in 2022.

== Career ==
Wang was taught the rules of chess when he was six years old. He had attended a local youth center with the hopes of being taught Xiangqi (also known as Chinese chess); however, the trainer did not show up. He was introduced to chess that day instead, and around one year later, he played in his first local junior tournament.

In 1999, Wang came third in the Under-10 division of the World Youth Chess Championships in Oropesa del Mar, Spain. In July 2002, he won the Qingdao Zhongfand Cup. In the following month, he played on board 4 for the gold medal-winning Chinese team in the Under-16 Chess Olympiad in Kuala Lumpur. In 2003, he beat future world champion Magnus Carlsen at the Under-14 World Youth Chess Championship. In July 2004, he again won gold with his national team in the Under-16 Chess Olympiad in Calicut, India. He scored 8/9 on the first board, a result that also earned him the individual gold medal, producing a performance rating of 2577. In the same month he won the "Children of Asia" tournament, a youth tournament in Yakutsk, Russia.

As with Gata Kamsky, Wang became a grandmaster without first gaining an International Master title. He achieved his first grandmaster norm at the 2005 Aeroflot Open A2 Group in Moscow, Russia, scoring 6.5/9. He achieved his second grandmaster norm in his first major tournament win at the 2005 Dubai Open, when he was still untitled and finished clear first with a score of 7/9 points (rating performance of 2731), ahead of 53 grandmasters and 30 international masters. In August 2005, he achieved his final grandmaster norm by winning the 2nd IGB Dato' Arthur Tan Malaysia Open in Kuala Lumpur (rating performance of 2843) with 10/11, two points clear of the rest of the field. He thereby became China's 20th grandmaster at the age of 16. In October 2005, he came joint-first in the Beijing Zonal 3.3 tournament, and took second place after a playoff match.

In February 2007, Wang won the GACC Tournament at the University of Malaya. In September 2007, he came in second place at the Asian Individual Championship in Manila, after Zhang Pengxiang. In October 2007, he came third at the World Junior Chess Championship in Yerevan. In January 2008, at the 15th Asian Team Chess Championship in Visakhapatnam, he won an individual gold medal for his performance on board three, scoring 5/6. The national team also won gold overall. In March 2008, he won the 23rd Reykjavik Open on tiebreakers with 7/9 (2721 performance rating). In April 2008, Wang competed at the Russian Team Championships in Dagomys, Sochi for the team 64 (Moscow), where he achieved a score of 8/11 (+5−0=6) and a performance rating of 2795. In July 2008, he came 5th out of 10 players at the 9th Karpov International Tournament in Poikovskiy, Russia. He scored 5/9 (+2−1=6) with a performance rating of 2734. In September 2008, he competed in the 5th Russia v. China Match in Ningbo, where he was the top scorer in the men's section with 3.5/5 and a performance rating of 2844, playing with Wang Yue, Bu Xiangzhi, Ni Hua, and Li Chao for the Chinese men's team.

In May 2009, Wang scored 5.5/10 (+3−2=5) at the 39th Bosna International Tournament in Sarajevo with a 2725 performance rating, sharing second place with Borki Predojević. In November 2009, he competed in the FIDE World Cup; after defeating Joshua Friedel and Surya Shekhar Ganguly in the first two rounds, he was knocked out by Shakhriyar Mamedyarov. In May 2010, he won the 40th Bosna International Tournament. The following month, he won the Chinese Chess Championship, scoring 7.5/11 and edging out 2004 champion Bu Xiangzhi and Zhou Jianchao on tiebreak. In September 2010, he competed in the Grand Slam of Shanghai, a four-player round-robin tournament, in which he played Levon Aronian, Alexei Shirov, and Vladimir Kramnik. Wang, the lowest-rated player in the tournament, scored three draws and three losses.

Wang assisted in preparing Levon Aronian for the 2011 Candidates Tournament. In a report on the 2010 Tal Memorial, chess journalist Ilya Odessky wrote that Aronian "in his teasing style" named Wang the most talented player of the tournament. In August 2012, he won the Biel Grandmaster Tournament in Biel, Switzerland, with six wins, one draw, and three losses. The tournament was played with three points for a win, and this result put him one point ahead of Magnus Carlsen, who had four wins and six draws. He was one of the AGON nominees for the FIDE Grand Prix 2012–13. In the first stage, held in London, he placed sixth with 5.5/11. He shared first place with Sergey Karjakin and Alexander Morozevich in the second stage in Tashkent, scoring 6.5/11. In the third stage in Beijing, he placed sixth with 5.5/11. In the final stage in Paris, he finished tenth with 5/11.

At the 2013 Norway Chess tournament, Wang finished in seventh place with three wins, three draws, and three losses. He was tied for last after five rounds, when he lost against eventual last-place finisher Jon Ludvig Hammer. However, he ended the tournament strongly, with two wins over the World Championship finalists Magnus Carlsen and Viswanathan Anand. In April 2014, he competed in the B Group of the Gashimov Memorial and scored 5/9, sharing third place with Etienne Bacrot. Later that year, he played for the Azerbaijani team SOCAR, which won the European Club Cup in Bilbao. In June 2015, he scored 6.5/9 in the 10th Edmonton International Tournament, tying for second place with Vassily Ivanchuk and Surya Shekhar Ganguly. On December 31, 2015, he won the 4th Al Ain Classic tournament with 8/9, 1.5 points ahead of the field, achieving the victory with a round to spare. In March 2016, he won the 6th HDBank Cup in Ho Chi Minh City, Vietnam with 8/9.

In April 2017, Wang came first in the Sharjah Masters tournament. The following month, he won the Asian Continental Championship in Chengdu, edging out Bu Xiangzhi on tiebreak score after both players finished on 7/9 points (+5−0=4).

In October 2019, Wang qualified for the 2020 Candidates Tournament by winning the FIDE Grand Swiss Tournament 2019 with a score of 8/11 (+6−1=4). In December 2019, he won the Yinzhou Cup in Ningbo, China. When the Candidates finished in 2021, he placed last, scoring 5/14. After the final game of the tournament, he announced his retirement from professional chess, citing digestion-related health issues. He then reversed his decision to retire and participated in Norway Chess 2022.

== China Chess League ==
Wang played for the Hebei chess club in the China Chess League (CCL).

== Personal life ==
Wang attended the School of Journalism and Communication at Peking University.

Preceded by Ding Liren	Chinese Chess Champion; 2010	Succeeded by Ding Liren
