= Yu Shaoteng =

Chinese chess grandmaster (born 1979)

Personal information
- Born: March 26, 1979 (age 47) Guangzhou, Guangdong, China

Chess career
- Country: China
- Title: Grandmaster (2004)
- FIDE rating: 2476 (July 2026)
- Peak rating: 2550 (July 2002)

Yu Shaoteng
- Traditional Chinese: 餘少騰
- Simplified Chinese: 余少腾
Transcriptions
Standard Mandarin
- Hanyu Pinyin: Yú Shàoténg
- Wade–Giles: Yu Shaot'eng
- IPA: [y̌ ʂâʊtʰə̌ŋ]
Yue: Cantonese
- Yale Romanization: Yyùh siu tàhng
- Jyutping: Jyu4 siu3 tang4
- IPA: [ʔy̏ː ɕīːu tʰɐ̏ŋ]
Southern Min
- Hokkien POJ: Û Chió-thêng

Yu Shaoteng (Chinese: 余少腾; pinyin: Yú Shǎoténg; born March 26, 1979, in Guangzhou, Guangdong) is a Chinese chess Grandmaster, and is the personal trainer of chess prodigy Hou Yifan. He took part in the FIDE World Chess Championship 2002, but was knocked out in the first round by Zhang Zhong. In 2004, he became China's 17th Grandmaster at the age of 25.

== Grandmaster title ==
He obtained four GM norms before being awarded the GM title. They were at:

- In February 2002, 2nd Trignac Open International; score 7/9.
- In March 2002, 6th Open Anibal in Linares; score 7/10.
- In July 2004, 2nd ASEAN Masters GM in Bangkok; score 6.5/10.
- In August 2004, 3rd ASEAN Masters GM in Bangkok; score 6/10.

== National team ==
Yu has competed in the China national chess team in the Chess Olympiad once at the 33rd Chess Olympiad in 1998 (games played 4: +1, =2, -1), and twice at the Asian Team Chess Championships (1999–2003) (games played 7: +2, =2, -3).

== See also ==
- Chess in China
