= Chinese Xiangqi Association =

China-based chess association

The Chinese Xiangqi Association (Chinese: 中国象棋协会) was founded in 1962 as a member of the All-China Sports Federation promoting xiangqi, or Chinese chess, and is based in Beijing. It is among the founding members of the Asian Xiangqi Federation, and since 1975 has been a member of the International Xiangqi Federation. In addition to organising and hosting xiangqi tournaments, it is responsible for publishing approximately 95% of xiangqi books and other publications on the subject in China.
