= Xie Jun =

Chinese chess grandmaster (born 1970)

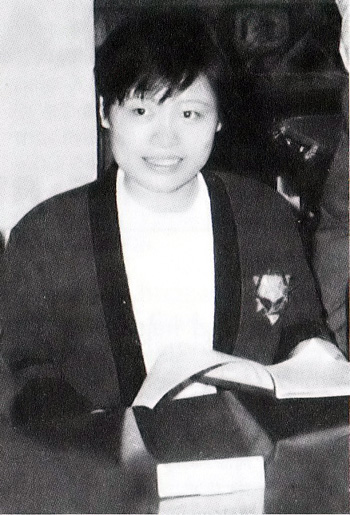
- Xie, Curitiba 1993

Personal information
- Born: October 30, 1970 (age 55) Baoding, Hebei, China
- Spouse: Wu Shaobin

Chess career
- Country: China
- Title: Grandmaster (1993)
- Women's World Champion: 1991–1996; 1999–2001
- FIDE rating: 2574 (September 2026) [inactive]
- Peak rating: 2574 (January 2008)

Xie Jun
- Simplified Chinese: 谢军
- Traditional Chinese: 謝軍
Transcriptions
Standard Mandarin
- Hanyu Pinyin: Xiè Jūn
- Wade–Giles: Hsieh^{4} Chun^{1}
- IPA: [ɕjê tɕýn]

Xie Jun (Chinese: 谢军; born October 30, 1970) is a Chinese chess grandmaster and is the first Asian woman to become a chess grandmaster. She had two separate reigns as Women's World Chess Champion, from 1991 to 1996 and again from 1999 to 2001. Xie is one of three women to have at least two separate reigns, besides Elisaveta Bykova and Hou Yifan. Xie Jun is the current president of the Chinese Chess Association. In 2019, she was inducted into the World Chess Hall of Fame.

== Early life and career ==
Although born in Baoding, Hebei in 1970 and raised in Beijing, the ancestral home of Xie and her parents is Liaoyuan, Jilin. At the age of six Xie began to play Chinese chess, and by the age of 10 she had become the girls' xiangqi champion of Beijing. At the urging of government authorities, she soon began playing international chess. Despite indifferent training opportunities, Xie became the Chinese girls' chess champion in 1984. In 1988 she tied for second–fourth places at the World Junior Girls' Championship in Adelaide; as the highest-placed Asian player in the tournament, she earned the Asian Junior Girls' Championship title.

At the age of 20 Xie won the right to challenge for the women's world title, and in 1991 she defeated Maia Chiburdanidze of Georgia, who had held the title since 1978, by a score of 8½–6½.

In 1993 Xie successfully defended her title against Nana Ioseliani (winning the match 8½–2½). In the summer of 1994 she was awarded the Grandmaster title; she was the first Asian woman to become a grandmaster, and the sixth woman ever to be awarded that title. She lost the 1996 Women's World Chess Championship to Susan Polgar of Hungary (8½–4½) but regained the title in 1999 by defeating another championship finalist, Alisa Galliamova (8½–6½), after Polgar refused to accept match conditions and forfeited her title. In 2000, FIDE changed the format of the world championship to a knock-out system, and Xie won the title again, beating fellow Chinese player Qin Kanying 2½–1½ in the final.

In Guangzhou in April 2000, Women's Champion Xie played a match with former World Champion Anatoly Karpov. Billed as a "female vs. male chess contest", the match consisted of four games at normal time controls and two rapid games. The four-game portion was won by Karpov 2½–1½ (1 win, 3 draws), and the rapid-play portion also went to Karpov, 1½–½ (1 win, 1 draw).

A hero in China, Xie became widely known for her optimism and vivid attacking style. Her success did much to popularize international chess in her country and the rest of Asia. Xie Jun proved to be the first of a number of strong Chinese women players, the others being Zhu Chen, Xu Yuhua, and Wang Lei. She was also an important factor in the Chinese women's team winning the gold medal at the 1998 Chess Olympiad in Elista in Kalmykia, Russia.

In July 2004, she was awarded the titles of International Arbiter and FIDE Senior Trainer. In April 2019, Xie Jun was appointed as the new president of the Chinese Chess Association.

== Personal life ==
Around the end of the 1990s, Xie was reading for a doctorate in psychology at Beijing Normal University. By 2008, Xie Jun directed an agency in the Beijing region taking care of chess and Go talents. She is married to her former coach Wu Shaobin.

== See also ==
- Chess in China
- Women in chess

Preceded by Qin Kanying	Women's Chinese Chess Champion; 1989	Succeeded by Peng Zhaoqin

Preceded by Maia Chiburdanidze	Women's World Chess Champion First Reign; 1991–1996	Succeeded by Susan Polgar
Forfeit Title last held by Susan Polgar	Women's World Chess Champion Second Reign; 1999–2001	Succeeded by Zhu Chen
