= China Chess League =

Chinese professional league for chess clubs

- Chinese: 中国国际象棋联赛
Transcriptions
Standard Mandarin
- Hanyu Pinyin: Zhōngguó guójìxiàngqí lián sái
- Wade–Giles: Chung-kuo kuochihsiangch'i lien sai
- Tongyong Pinyin: Jhōngguó guójìsiàngcí lián sái
- Yale Romanization: Jūnggwó gwójìsyàngchí lyán sái
- IPA: [ʈʂʊ́ŋkwǒ kwǒtɕîɕjɛ̂ntɕʰǐ ljɛ̌n sǎɪ]
Yue: Cantonese
- Yale Romanization: Júng kwok kwok jai jeuhng kèih lyùhn choi
- Jyutping: Zung1 gwok3 gwok3 zai3 zoeng6 kei4 lyun4 coi3
- IPA: [tsʊ́ŋ kʷɔ̄ːk kʷɔ̄ːk tsɐ̄i tsœ̀ːŋ kʰȅi ly̏ːn tsʰɔ̄ːi]

The China Chess League (CCL) (Chinese: 中国国际象棋联赛) is a Chinese professional league for chess clubs. The league is organized by the Chinese Chess Association. It is sponsored by Youngor Group and was sponsored by the Shandong Torch Real Estate Group (2005–2009) and it has been able to determine the league's sponsorship name. Seasons usually run from April to November each year. The league is contested by 10 clubs. Under the rules of the league each team is allowed to register seven Chinese players and an unlimited quota of foreign players. The rules require five boards with at least two female players and a 25 min+30 sec increment rapid game must also be played on one of the boards.

For the 2008 season, the league has attracted 26 GMs, three IMs, and eleven WGMs. This season, ten teams are competing over 18 rounds in six different cities in a six-month period, from March to August.

For the 2009 season, the league was won by Shanghai, with the top male and female scorers being Wang Hao and Ju Wenjun respectively.

== Clubs and players ==
Ten teams are represented:

=== Beijing Aigo Team 北京爱国者国际象棋队 ===
- Ye Jiangchuan
- Li Chao
- Yu Yangyi
- Zhao Xue
- Wang Yu
- Arman Pashikian (Armenia)

=== China Mobile Group Chongqing Company Ltd 重庆移动通信国际象棋队 ===
- Liang Chong
- Wang Chen
- Huang Qian
- Tan Zhongyi
- Alexander Motylev (Russia)
- Zhang Zhong (Singapore)

=== Hebei 国台酒河北国际象棋队 ===
- Wang Hao
- Zhang Pengxiang
- Peng Xiaomin
- Wang Rui
- Guo Jin
- Wang Doudou
- Zhai Mo

=== Jiangsu 蓝珀通信江苏队 ===
- Zhou Weiqi
- Xu Jun
- Lin Chen
- Wu Wenjin
- Ruan Lufei
- Wei Yi
- Shen Yang
- Guo Qi
- Dyland Xue (United States)

=== Shandong 山东玲珑轮胎队 ===
- Bu Xiangzhi
- Zhao Jun
- Wen Yang
- Wu Kaiyu
- Hou Yifan
- Zhang Jilin
- Sun Xinyue
- Vladimir Akopian (Armenia)

=== Bank of Qingdao 青岛银行队 ===
- Tong Yuanming
- Liu Qingnan
- Chen Peng
- Sun Fanghui
- Zhou Min
- Wesley So (Philippines)
- Vera Nebolsina (Russia)
- Pentala Harikrishna (India)
- Elena Tairova (Russia)
- Mikhail Kobalia (Russia)
- Nana Dzagnidze (Georgia)

=== Qingdao Yucai 青岛育才中学国际象棋队 ===
- Xiu Deshun
- Ma Qun
- Wan Yunguo
- Zhang Ziyang
- Gu Xiaobing
- Gong Qianyun
- Liang Zhihua
- Ernesto Inarkiev (Russia)
- Hoang Thi Bao Tram (Vietnam)
- Peng Zhaoqin (Netherlands)

=== Shanghai 上海建桥学院国际象棋队 ===
- Ni Hua
- Zhou Jianchao
- Lou Yiping
- Lu Yijie
- Ju Wenjun
- Zhang Xiaowen
- Andrei Volokitin (Ukraine)

=== Tianjin 天津南开大学国际象棋队 ===
- Wang Yue
- Li Haoyu
- Xu Hanbing
- Xu Yong
- Ning Chunhong
- Anna Muzychuk (Slovenia)
- Batkhuyag Munguntuul (Mongolia)

=== Zhejiang 浙江队 ===
- Ding Liren
- Yu Lie
- Lu Shanglei
- Jia Haoxiang
- Xu Yuhua
- Ding Yixin
- Wang Xiaohui
- Alexey Dreev (Russia)
- Zhu Chen (Qatar)
- Nikita Vitiugov (Russia)
- Vladimir Malakhov (Russia)
- Vladimir Belov (Russia)

== See also ==
- Chinese Chess Association
- Chess in China

Other leagues

- United States Chess League
- Chess Bundesliga - Germany
- 4NCL - the British-based Four Nations Chess League
