= First Saturday (chess) =

Chess competition

First Saturday (Hungarian: Első Szombat) is a monthly chess event that has been held in Budapest, Hungary since 1992. The primary purpose of the event is to give aspiring chess players opportunities to gain FIDE title norms.

== Format ==
The event begins on the first Saturday of every month, except for January.

Generally four separate round-robin tournaments are held concurrently, usually with ten players in each group. They are divided into the Grandmaster tournament, the International Master tournament, the FIDE Master-A tournament and the FIDE Master-B tournament.

The Grandmaster tournament offers opportunities for players to gain Grandmaster and International Master norms. In order to do this, the tournament must meet certain conditions, as laid out in FIDE's regulations. Some of the requirements are:

- At least nine rounds are required.
- At least five of the players must hold a FIDE title (excluding Candidate Masters), at least three of whom must be Grandmasters.
- The average FIDE rating of the participants must be at least 2380.
- At least three different national chess federations must be represented.
- A minimum time control is set, equivalent to about a four-hour playing session.

In practice, the Grandmaster tournament typically consists of three Grandmasters, about four International Masters and about three players with a lesser FIDE title, or no title. Depending on the average rating of the tournament, about 6½–7½ points are typically required for a Grandmaster norm, and about 5–6 points are required for an International Master norm. If ten players cannot be found to fulfill the FIDE title norm requirements, a six-player double round robin may be organised instead. No prize money is awarded; the Grandmasters are paid to compete, subsidised by the entry fees of the norm seekers.

The International Master tournament is organised along similar lines, with at least three paid International Masters competing to allow the other players the chance to gain International Master norms. The FIDE Master tournaments simply give the players an opportunity to improve their rating, and possibly gain the FIDE Master title if they can increase it to 2300 or more.

Recently, Montenegro and Serbia have been holding Third Saturday tournaments which are also designed to give competitors a chance to win a GM norm.
