= Chess club =

Club formed for the purpose of playing the board game of chess

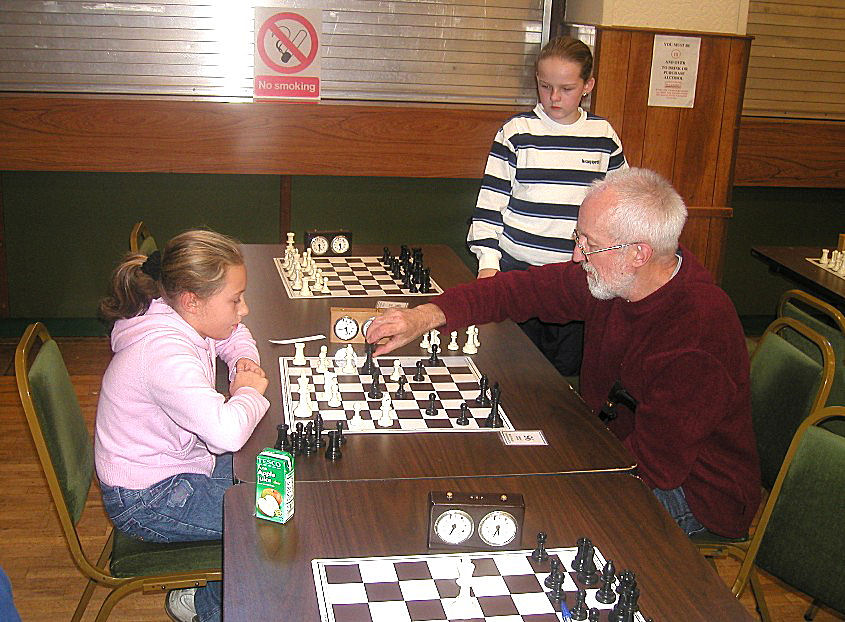
Young and old playing in a chess club

A chess club is a club formed for the purpose of playing the board game of chess. Chess clubs often provide for both informal and tournament games and sometimes offer league play. Traditionally clubs play over the board and face to face chess as opposed to playing on internet chess servers or computer chess.

== Organization ==
Clubs are mainly attached to a national federation, either directly or through membership of a regional chess association. The national federation in turn is a member of FIDE, the international governing body of chess. The global aegis helps to establish uniformity of rules and playing conditions internationally, though some countries such as the United States use their own official set of rules with minor differences from FIDE rules. The United States has many chess clubs affiliated with the United States Chess Federation (USCF). A club's affiliation with its national chess federation helps to standardize chess tournament rules.

== Club facilities ==
Chess clubs typically provide at least some of the following:

- Informal games, 'friendlies'
- Club and inter-club competitions
- Opportunities to play in one or more leagues organized on a geographical basis
- Tournaments
- A rating system where the results of inter-club games are rated to enable players to judge their standing and progress. Many clubs use the rating system provided by FIDE or their affiliated national chess organization.
- Coaching by a more knowledgeable chess player and lectures/tuition evenings
- A library of chess books and journals, tournament records, internet access to chess databases
- Chess sets and boards, score sheets and chess clocks. Sometimes players may bring their own equipment.
- Adequate rooms or halls with tables and chairs, lighting and ventilation
- A regular meeting place that may be volunteered, rented or owned outright and maintained on club income, membership dues or donations. Small town clubs are usually housed in public, community buildings.
- Local media publicity, chess network contacts
