= China at the Chess Olympiads =

The People's Republic of China (PRC) first competed at the Chess Olympiads in 1978 in Buenos Aires, Argentina. The women's team began competing in 1980. Open teams in the Olympiads can include female players. Both teams have competed ever since.

== Men's team records ==
=== Overall statistics ===
Appearances	Years	Points	Games played	Match points	Matches played	Games			Matches			% (Points/Games played)	Team medals won	Individual medals won
15	1978–2006	482	832	260	208	+313	=338	-181	+111	=38	-59	57.9	0 - 1 - 0	1 - 3 - 1

=== Yearly statistics ===
Year	Final position	Elo team	Points	Games played	Match points	Matches played	Games			Matches			% (Points/Games played)	Elo opposition average	Elo performance rating	Individual medals
1978	20.	2273	30½	56	15	14	+23	=15	-18	+6	=3	-5	54.5	2406	2413	0 - 1 - 0
1980	38.	2380	28½	56	14	14	+19	=19	-18	+5	=4	-5	50.9	2366	2316	0 - 0 - 0
1982	37.	2395	29	56	13	14	+22	=14	-20	+6	=1	-7	51.8	2421	2407	0 - 1 - 0
1984	12.	2433	32	56	18	14	+17	=30	-9	+7	=4	-3	57.1	2451	2487	0 - 0 - 0
1986	7.	2448	34	56	19	14	+25	=18	-13	+9	=1	-4	60.7	2423	2466	0 - 0 - 1
1988	8.	2441	33	56	18	14	+24	=18	-14	+8	=2	-4	58.9	2496	2546	0 - 0 - 0
1990	6.	2521	33	56	19	14	+23	=20	-13	+8	=3	-3	58.9	2476	2526	0 - 0 - 0
1992	16.	2523	32½	56	18	14	+21	=23	-12	+9	=0	-5	58.0	2447	2468	0 - 0 - 0
1994	11.	2530	33½	56	17	14	+22	=23	-11	+7	=3	-4	59.8	2501	2566	0 - 0 - 0
1996	13.	2518	32½	56	16	14	+18	=29	-9	+7	=2	-5	58.0	2552	2595	0 - 0 - 0
1998	5.	2498	31½	52	19	13	+20	=23	-9	+8	=3	-2	60.6	2575	2640	0 - 0 - 0
2000	9.	2651	33	56	19	14	+19	=28	-9	+7	=5	-2	58.9	2524	2589	0 - 0 - 0
2002	5.	2633	33½	56	19	14	+20	=27	-9	+8	=3	-3	59.8	2565	2637	0 - 0 - 0
2004	24.	2612	31½	56	19	14	+17	=29	-10	+8	=3	-3	56.3	2538	2581	0 - 0 - 0
2006	2.	2628	34	52	17	13	+23	=22	-7	+8	=1	-4	65.4	2576	2686	1 - 1 - 0
2008																

=== Overall Team vs Team statistics ===
Team	Matches	Points	Games played	Games			Matches			%	4 : 0	3½:½	3 : 1	2½:1½	2 : 2	1½:2½	1 : 3	½:3½	0 : 4
Team	Matches	Points	Games played	+	=	-	+	=	-	%	4 : 0	3½:½	3 : 1	2½:1½	2 : 2	1½:2½	1 : 3	½:3½	0 : 4
ALL	208	482	832	313	338	181	111	38	59	57.9	13	22	33	43	38	31	20	8	0
ALB	2	3½	8	3	1	4	0	1	1	43.8	0	0	0	0	1	1	0	0	0
ARG	6	12	24	6	12	6	4	0	2	50.0	0	0	2	2	0	0	0	2	0
ARM	4	8	16	3	10	3	1	2	1	50.0	0	0	0	1	2	1	0	0	0
AUS	2	4½	8	3	3	2	1	1	0	56.3	0	0	0	1	1	0	0	0	0
AUT	2	4½	8	4	1	3	1	0	1	56.3	0	1	0	0	0	0	1	0	0
AZE	2	5	8	3	4	1	1	1	0	62.5	0	0	1	0	1	0	0	0	0
BEL	2	5	8	4	2	2	1	0	1	62.5	1	0	0	0	0	0	1	0	0
BIH	2	4	8	2	4	2	1	0	1	50.0	0	0	0	1	0	1	0	0	0
BLR	2	6½	8	5	3	0	2	0	0	81.3	0	1	1	0	0	0	0	0	0
BRA	3	9	12	8	2	2	3	0	0	75.0	0	1	1	1	0	0	0	0	0
BUL	4	8	16	4	8	4	1	2	1	50.0	0	0	0	1	2	1	0	0	0
CHI	3	4	12	2	4	6	0	1	2	33.3	0	0	0	0	1	0	2	0	0
COL	4	11	16	7	8	1	3	1	0	68.8	0	1	1	1	1	0	0	0	0
CRO	1	3	4	3	0	1	1	0	0	75.0	0	0	1	0	0	0	0	0	0
CSR	4	4½	16	1	7	8	0	0	4	28.1	0	0	0	0	0	2	1	1	0
CUB	9	17	36	9	16	11	3	2	4	47.2	0	0	1	2	2	2	2	0	0
CYP	1	3½	4	3	1	0	1	0	0	87.5	0	1	0	0	0	0	0	0	0
CZE	3	7½	12	4	7	1	2	1	0	62.5	0	0	1	1	1	0	0	0	0
DEN	5	12½	20	8	9	3	3	2	0	62.5	0	1	0	2	2	0	0	0	0
DOM	3	10	12	8	4	0	3	0	0	83.3	0	2	1	0	0	0	0	0	0
ECU	1	4	4	4	0	0	1	0	0	100.0	1	0	0	0	0	0	0	0	0
EGY	1	3½	4	3	1	0	1	0	0	87.5	0	1	0	0	0	0	0	0	0
ENG	3	5	12	2	6	4	1	1	1	41.7	0	0	0	1	1	0	0	1	0
ESP	2	3½	8	1	5	2	0	1	1	43.8	0	0	0	0	1	1	0	0	0
EST	1	2½	4	2	1	1	1	0	0	62.5	0	0	0	1	0	0	0	0	0
FIN	3	8	12	5	6	1	2	1	0	66.7	0	0	2	0	1	0	0	0	0
FRA	3	4	12	1	6	5	0	0	3	33.3	0	0	0	0	0	2	1	0	0
GBG	1	4	4	4	0	0	1	0	0	100.0	1	0	0	0	0	0	0	0	0
GEO	5	10	20	5	10	5	1	0	4	50.0	1	0	0	0	0	4	0	0	0
GER	3	5½	12	1	9	2	0	2	1	45.8	0	0	0	0	2	1	0	0	0
GRE	2	5½	8	4	3	1	2	0	0	68.8	0	0	1	1	0	0	0	0	0
HUN	5	10	20	5	10	5	3	0	2	50.0	0	0	1	2	0	0	2	0	0
INA	1	2½	4	1	3	0	1	0	0	62.5	0	0	0	1	0	0	0	0	0
IND	2	4½	8	1	7	0	1	1	0	56.3	0	0	0	1	1	0	0	0	0
IRL	1	2½	4	1	3	0	1	0	0	62.5	0	0	0	1	0	0	0	0	0
ISL	7	11½	28	6	11	11	1	2	4	41.1	0	0	1	0	2	2	1	1	0
ISR	5	11	20	8	6	6	3	0	2	55.0	0	0	2	1	0	1	1	0	0
ISV	1	3½	4	3	1	0	1	0	0	87.5	0	1	0	0	0	0	0	0	0
ITA	2	5	8	4	2	2	1	1	0	62.5	0	0	1	0	1	0	0	0	0
JAM	1	4	4	4	0	0	1	0	0	100.0	1	0	0	0	0	0	0	0	0
KAZ	2	3½	8	1	5	2	1	0	1	43.8	0	0	0	1	0	0	1	0	0
KGZ	2	6½	8	5	3	0	2	0	0	81.3	0	1	1	0	0	0	0	0	0
LIB	1	3½	4	3	1	0	1	0	0	87.5	0	1	0	0	0	0	0	0	0
LIE	1	4	4	4	0	0	1	0	0	100.0	1	0	0	0	0	0	0	0	0
LUX	1	3	4	2	2	0	1	0	0	75.0	0	0	1	0	0	0	0	0	0
MDA	1	3½	4	3	1	0	1	0	0	87.5	0	1	0	0	0	0	0	0	0
MEX	2	4½	8	3	3	2	1	0	1	56.3	0	0	1	0	0	1	0	0	0
MGL	1	1½	4	1	1	2	0	0	1	37.5	0	0	0	0	0	1	0	0	0
MLI	1	4	4	4	0	0	1	0	0	100.0	1	0	0	0	0	0	0	0	0
NED	6	11½	24	6	11	7	3	1	2	47.9	0	0	0	3	1	1	0	1	0
NZL	1	3½	4	3	1	0	1	0	0	87.5	0	1	0	0	0	0	0	0	0
PAK	1	4	4	4	0	0	1	0	0	100.0	1	0	0	0	0	0	0	0	0
PAR	1	3	4	2	2	0	1	0	0	75.0	0	0	1	0	0	0	0	0	0
PER	2	6½	8	5	3	0	2	0	0	81.3	0	1	1	0	0	0	0	0	0
PHI	3	7	12	4	6	2	1	1	1	58.3	0	1	0	0	1	1	0	0	0
POL	5	11½	20	6	11	3	3	1	1	57.5	0	0	1	2	1	1	0	0	0
POR	1	3	4	3	0	1	1	0	0	75.0	0	0	1	0	0	0	0	0	0
QAT	1	4	4	4	0	0	1	0	0	100.0	1	0	0	0	0	0	0	0	0
ROM	5	9½	20	5	9	6	2	1	2	47.5	0	0	1	1	1	1	0	1	0
RUS	4	4½	16	0	9	7	0	0	4	28.1	0	0	0	0	0	1	3	0	0
RUS B	1	2½	4	2	1	1	1	0	0	62.5	0	0	0	1	0	0	0	0	0
SCO	2	6	8	5	2	1	2	0	0	75.0	0	1	0	1	0	0	0	0	0
SIN	3	11	12	11	0	1	3	0	0	91.7	2	0	1	0	0	0	0	0	0
SLO	1	1½	4	1	1	2	0	0	1	37.5	0	0	0	0	0	1	0	0	0
SLO C	1	4	4	4	0	0	1	0	0	100.0	1	0	0	0	0	0	0	0	0
SUI	6	15	24	9	12	3	3	2	1	62.5	0	1	2	0	2	1	0	0	0
SUI B	1	3	4	3	0	1	1	0	0	75.0	0	0	1	0	0	0	0	0	0
SVK	3	8	12	5	6	1	2	1	0	66.7	0	1	0	1	1	0	0	0	0
SWE	5	9	20	4	10	6	3	0	2	45.0	0	0	0	3	0	0	1	1	0
SYR	3	8½	12	7	3	2	3	0	0	70.8	0	1	0	2	0	0	0	0	0
TRI	1	4	4	4	0	0	1	0	0	100.0	1	0	0	0	0	0	0	0	0
TUN	1	2½	4	2	1	1	1	0	0	62.5	0	0	0	1	0	0	0	0	0
TUR	3	9	12	7	4	1	3	0	0	75.0	0	1	1	1	0	0	0	0	0
UKR	3	5½	12	2	7	3	0	2	1	45.8	0	0	0	0	2	1	0	0	0
URS	1	1	4	0	2	2	0	0	1	25.0	0	0	0	0	0	0	1	0	0
USA	5	9½	20	4	11	5	0	4	1	47.5	0	0	0	0	4	1	0	0	0
UZB	3	9	12	6	6	0	3	0	0	75.0	0	1	1	1	0	0	0	0	0
VEN	2	3½	8	3	1	4	0	1	1	43.8	0	0	0	0	1	1	0	0	0
WLS	1	2½	4	2	1	1	1	0	0	62.5	0	0	0	1	0	0	0	0	0
YUG	5	9½	20	7	5	8	2	1	2	47.5	0	0	1	1	1	0	2	0	0
YUG C	1	2½	4	2	1	1	1	0	0	62.5	0	0	0	1	0	0	0	0	0
Team	Matches	Points	Games played	games			matches			%	4 : 0	3½:½	3 : 1	2½:1½	2 : 2	1½:2½	1 : 3	½:3½	0 : 4
Team	Matches	Points	Games played	+	=	-	+	=	-	%	4 : 0	3½:½	3 : 1	2½:1½	2 : 2	1½:2½	1 : 3	½:3½	0 : 4

=== Individual statistics ===
By alphabetical order.

No.	Title	Name	Code	Appearances	Years	Points	Games played	+	=	-	%	Medals	
No.	Title	Name	Code	Appearances	Years	Points	Games played	+	=	-	%	Team	Individual
1.	GM	Bu Xiangzhi	CHN	3	2002–2006	22	35	12	20	3	62.9	0 - 1 - 0	0 - 0 - 0
2.	-	Chang Tung Lo	CHN	1	1978	3½	5	2	3	0	70.0	0 - 0 - 0	0 - 0 - 0
3.	-	Chen De	CHN	1	1978	2½	9	1	3	5	27.8	0 - 0 - 0	0 - 0 - 0
4.	-	Li Shongjian	CHN	1	1980	0	0	0	0	0	0.0	0 - 0 - 0	0 - 0 - 0
5.	IM	Li Zunian	CHN	4	1980–1986	25½	49	15	21	13	52.0	0 - 0 - 0	0 - 0 - 0
6.	IM	Liang Chong	CHN	1	2000	1½	3	1	1	1	50.0	0 - 0 - 0	0 - 0 - 0
7.	IM	Liang Jinrong	CHN	7	1978–1986, 1990–1992	38	70	23	30	17	54.3	0 - 0 - 0	0 - 0 - 0
8.	IM	Lin Ta	CHN	4	1984–1990	17½	28	13	9	6	62.5	0 - 0 - 0	0 - 0 - 0
9.	IM	Lin Weiguo	CHN	2	1992–1994	8½	14	6	5	3	60.7	0 - 0 - 0	0 - 0 - 0
10.	IM	Liu Wenzhe	CHN	3	1978–1982	16	37	14	4	19	43.2	0 - 0 - 0	0 - 0 - 0
11.	GM	Ni Hua	CHN	3	2000–2002, 2006	13	24	6	14	4	54.2	0 - 1 - 0	0 - 0 - 0
12.	GM	Peng Xiaomin	CHN	4	1994–2000	29	47	18	22	7	61.7	0 - 0 - 0	0 - 0 - 0
13.	IM	Qi Jingxuan	CHN	3	1978–1980, 1984	22	38	16	12	10	57.9	0 - 0 - 0	0 - 0 - 0
14.	-	Tan Chengxuan	CHN	1	1988	1	1	1	0	0	100.0	0 - 0 - 0	0 - 0 - 0
15.	-	Tang Hongjian	CHN	1	1980	1	1	1	0	0	100.0	0 - 0 - 0	0 - 0 - 0
16.	-	Wang Bijun	CHN	1	1982	0	0	0	0	0	0.0	0 - 0 - 0	0 - 0 - 0
17.	-	Wang Hao	CHN	1	2004	2½	5	1	3	1	50.0	0 - 0 - 0	0 - 0 - 0
18.	FM	Wang Rui	CHN	1	1998	2	3	2	0	1	66.7	0 - 0 - 0	0 - 0 - 0
19.	GM	Wang Yue	CHN	2	2004–2006	18	24	13	10	1	75.0	0 - 1 - 0	1 - 1 - 0
20.	GM	Wang Zili	CHN	5	1988–1996	32	52	23	18	11	61.5	0 - 0 - 0	0 - 0 - 0
21.	IM	Wu Shaobin	CHN	1	1994	2	3	1	2	0	66.7	0 - 0 - 0	0 - 0 - 0
22.	GM	Wu Wenjin	CHN	2	1998–2000	6½	12	5	3	4	54.2	0 - 0 - 0	0 - 0 - 0
23.	GM	Xu Jun	CHN	10	1984–1996, 2000–2004	69½	118	41	57	20	58.9	0 - 0 - 0	0 - 0 - 1
24.	-	Yang Xian	CHN	1	1986	4	8	2	4	2	50.0	0 - 0 - 0	0 - 0 - 0
25.	GM	Ye Jiangchuan	CHN	12	1982–2004	71	126	42	58	26	56.3	0 - 0 - 0	0 - 1 - 0
26.	GM	Ye Rongguang	CHN	3	1988–1992	24½	35	19	11	5	70.0	0 - 0 - 0	0 - 0 - 0
27.	FM	Yin Hao	CHN	1	1996	1½	2	1	1	0	75.0	0 - 0 - 0	0 - 0 - 0
28.	FM	Yu Shaoteng	CHN	1	1998	2	4	1	2	1	50.0	0 - 0 - 0	0 - 0 - 0
29.	GM	Zhang Pengxiang	CHN	2	2002, 2006	5½	10	5	1	4	55.0	0 - 1 - 0	0 - 0 - 0
30.	-	Zhang Weida	CHN	2	1978, 1982	6½	11	5	3	3	59.1	0 - 0 - 0	0 - 1 - 0
31.	GM	Zhang Zhong	CHN	5	1996–1998, 2002–2006	31½	55	21	21	13	57.3	0 - 1 - 0	0 - 0 - 0
32.	GM	Zhao Jun	CHN	1	2006	2	3	2	0	1	66.7	0 - 1 - 0	0 - 0 - 0

== Women's team records ==
=== Overall statistics ===
Appearances	Years	Points	Games played	Match points	Matches played	Games			Matches			% (Points/Games played)	Team medals won	Individual medals won
14	1980-2006	391½	582	283	194	+296	=191	-95	+125	=33	-36	67.3	4 - 1 - 4	10 - 5 - 6

=== Yearly statistics ===
Year	Final position	ELO team	Points	Games played	Match points	Matches played	Games			Matches			% (Points/Games played)	ELO opposition average	ELO performance rating	Individual medals
1980	6.	1800	24	42	15	14	+16	=16	-10	+5	=5	-4	57.1	-	-	0 - 0 - 0
1982	5.	2090	24½	42	18	14	+17	=15	-10	+7	=4	-3	58.3	2105	2132	0 - 0 - 0
1984	5.	2098	26	42	18	14	+18	=16	-8	+8	=2	-4	61.9	2110	2173	0 - 0 - 0
1986	4.	2133	28	42	18	14	+22	=12	-8	+8	=2	-4	66.7	2152	2231	0 - 1 - 1
1988	4.	1962	27	42	21	14	+23	=8	-11	+10	=1	-3	64.3	2274	2341	1 - 0 - 0
1990	3.	2302	29	42	21	14	+23	=12	-7	+10	=1	-3	69.0	2258	2385	0 - 0 - 1
1992	3.	2398	28½	42	20	14	+24	=9	-9	+9	=2	-3	67.9	2285	2409	0 - 0 - 2
1994	3.	2420	27	42	22	14	+19	=16	-7	+10	=2	-2	64.3	2288	2362	0 - 1 - 0
1996	2.	2425	28½	42	21	14	+22	=13	-7	+10	=1	-3	67.9	2333	2457	2 - 0 - 0
1998	1.	2480	29	39	21	13	+20	=18	-1	+9	=3	-1	74.4	2343	2522	2 - 0 - 0
2000	1.	2537	32	42	24	14	+23	=18	-1	+10	=4	-0	76.2	2347	2549	2 - 0 - 1
2002	1.	2485	29½	42	22	14	+24	=11	-7	+10	=2	-2	70.2	2358	2507	2 - 0 - 0
2004	1.	2514	31	42	23	14	+23	=16	-3	+11	=1	-2	73.8	2353	2521	1 - 1 - 1
2006	3.	2408	27½	39	19	13	+22	=11	-6	+8	=3	-2	70.5	2341	2492	0 - 2 - 0
2008																

=== Overall Team vs Team statistics ===
Team	Matches	Points	Games played	Games			Matches			%	3 : 0	2 : 0; 2½:½	1½:½; 2 : 1	1 : 1; 1½:1½	½:1½; 1 : 2	0 : 2 ½:2½	0 : 3
Team	Matches	Points	Games played	+	=	-	+	=	-	%	3 : 0	2 : 0; 2½:½	1½:½; 2 : 1	1 : 1; 1½:1½	½:1½; 1 : 2	0 : 2 ½:2½	0 : 3
ALL	194	391½	582	296	191	95	125	33	36	67.3	42	42	41	33	23	12	1
ARGENTINA	4	10½	12	9	3	0	4	0	0	87.5	1	3	0	0	0	0	0
ARMENIA	3	5½	9	5	1	3	2	1	0	61.1	0	0	2	1	0	0	0
AUSTRIA	1	2½	3	2	1	0	1	0	0	83.3	0	1	0	0	0	0	0
AZERBAIJAN	1	1	3	1	0	2	0	0	1	33.3	0	0	0	0	1	0	0
BANGLADESH	1	3	3	3	0	0	1	0	0	100.0	1	0	0	0	0	0	0
BOSNIA AND HERZEGOVINA	1	3	3	3	0	0	1	0	0	100.0	1	0	0	0	0	0	0
BELARUS	3	7	9	5	4	0	3	0	0	77.8	0	2	1	0	0	0	0
BRAZIL	3	9	9	9	0	0	3	0	0	100.0	3	0	0	0	0	0	0
BULGARIA	11	22½	33	16	13	4	7	2	2	68.2	2	4	1	2	1	1	0
CANADA	2	6	6	6	0	0	2	0	0	100.0	2	0	0	0	0	0	0
COLOMBIA	1	2	3	2	0	1	1	0	0	66.7	0	0	1	0	0	0	0
CROATIA	2	5½	6	5	1	0	2	0	0	91.7	1	1	0	0	0	0	0
CZECHOSLOVAKIA	2	5½	6	5	1	0	2	0	0	91.7	1	1	0	0	0	0	0
CUBA	2	4	6	4	0	2	1	0	1	66.7	1	0	0	0	1	0	0
CZECH REPUBLIC	2	4½	6	3	3	0	1	1	0	75.0	1	0	0	1	0	0	0
ENGLAND	8	16	24	12	8	4	5	2	1	66.7	2	1	2	2	0	1	0
SPAIN	5	11½	15	10	3	2	4	1	0	76.7	2	0	2	1	0	0	0
ESTONIA	1	1½	3	1	1	1	0	1	0	50.0	0	0	0	1	0	0	0
FRANCE	3	8	9	7	2	0	3	0	0	88.9	1	2	0	0	0	0	0
GEORGIA	7	6½	21	1	11	9	0	1	6	31.0	0	0	0	1	4	2	0
GERMANY	10	17	30	9	16	5	6	1	3	56.7	0	3	3	1	1	2	0
GREECE	5	12½	15	12	1	2	5	0	0	83.3	2	1	2	0	0	0	0
HUNGARY	14	22½	42	11	23	8	6	4	4	53.6	1	1	4	4	2	2	0
INDIA	5	11	15	8	6	1	4	0	1	73.3	1	2	1	0	1	0	0
ISRAEL	4	7½	12	6	3	3	2	1	1	62.5	1	0	1	1	1	0	0
JAPAN	1	2	3	2	0	1	1	0	0	66.7	0	0	1	0	0	0	0
KAZAKHSTAN	4	8	12	6	4	2	3	0	1	66.7	0	2	1	0	1	0	0
KYYRGYZSTAN	3	8½	9	8	1	0	3	0	0	94.4	2	1	0	0	0	0	0
LATVIA	3	8	9	7	2	0	3	0	0	88.9	2	0	1	0	0	0	0
LITHUANIA	1	3	3	3	0	0	1	0	0	100.0	1	0	0	0	0	0	0
MALAYSIA	1	3	3	3	0	0	1	0	0	100.0	1	0	0	0	0	0	0
MOLDOVA	2	5	6	4	2	0	2	0	0	83.3	1	0	1	0	0	0	0
MALTA	1	3	3	3	0	0	1	0	0	100.0	1	0	0	0	0	0	0
NETHERLANDS	4	7	12	3	8	1	2	2	0	58.3	0	0	2	2	0	0	0
NORWAY	1	2½	3	2	1	0	1	0	0	83.3	0	1	0	0	0	0	0
PHILIPPINES	1	3	3	3	0	0	1	0	0	100.0	1	0	0	0	0	0	0
POLAND	11	20	33	14	12	7	7	1	3	60.6	0	4	3	1	2	1	0
PORTUGAL	1	3	3	3	0	0	1	0	0	100.0	1	0	0	0	0	0	0
ROMANIA	11	22½	33	16	13	4	8	2	1	68.2	0	5	3	2	1	0	0
RUSSIA	8	15	24	10	10	4	5	3	0	62.5	0	1	4	3	0	0	0
SWITZERLAND	1	2½	3	2	1	0	1	0	0	83.3	0	1	0	0	0	0	0
SLOVAKIA	2	4½	6	3	3	0	2	0	0	75.0	0	1	1	0	0	0	0
SWEDEN	4	7	12	5	4	3	2	1	1	58.3	0	2	0	1	0	1	0
TRINIDAD AND TOBAGO	1	3	3	3	0	0	1	0	0	100.0	1	0	0	0	0	0	0
UKRAINE	7	11½	21	7	9	5	2	3	2	54.8	1	0	1	3	2	0	0
SOVIET UNION	6	4½	18	1	7	10	0	1	5	25.0	0	0	0	1	2	2	1
UNITED STATES	6	9½	18	7	5	6	1	3	2	52.8	1	0	0	3	2	0	0
VIETNAM	5	13	15	12	2	1	4	1	0	86.7	3	1	0	1	0	0	0
YUGOSLAVIA	6	11½	18	9	5	4	4	1	1	63.9	1	0	3	1	1	0	0
YUGOSLAVIA B	1	2½	3	2	1	0	1	0	0	83.3	0	1	0	0	0	0	0
YUGOSLAVIA C	1	3	3	3	0	0	1	0	0	100.0	1	0	0	0	0	0	0
Team	Matches	Points	Games played	Games			Matches			%	3 : 0	2 : 0; 2½:½	1½:½; 2 : 1	1 : 1; 1½:1½	½:1½; 1 : 2	0 : 2 ½:2½	0 : 3
Team	Matches	Points	Games played	+	=	-	+	=	-	%	3 : 0	2 : 0; 2½:½	1½:½; 2 : 1	1 : 1; 1½:1½	½:1½; 1 : 2	0 : 2 ½:2½	0 : 3

=== Individual statistics ===
By alphabetical order.

No.	Title	Name	Code	Appearances	Years	Points	Games played	+	=	-	%	Medals	
No.	Title	Name	Code	Appearances	Years	Points	Games played	+	=	-	%	Team	Individual
1.	WIM	An Yangfeng	CHN	4	1980–1986	34½	53	28	13	12	65.1	0 - 0 - 0	0 - 0 - 0
2.	-	He Tianjian	CHN	1	1986	½	1	0	1	0	50.0	0 - 0 - 0	0 - 0 - 0
3.	WFM	Hou Yifan	CHN	1	2006	11	13	10	2	1	84.6	0 - 0 - 1	0 - 1 - 0
4.	WIM	Huang Qian	CHN	1	2004	7½	10	6	3	1	75.0	1 - 0 - 0	0 - 0 - 0
5.	WGM	Liu Shilan	CHN	5	1980–1988	38½	68	25	27	16	56.6	0 - 0 - 0	0 - 1 - 1
6.	WIM	Peng Zhaoqin	CHN	4	1988–1994	27	42	23	8	11	64.3	0 - 0 - 3	1 - 0 - 0
7.	WIM	Qin Kanying	CHN	3	1990–1994	21½	33	15	13	5	65.2	0 - 0 - 3	0 - 0 - 1
8.	-	Shen Yang	CHN	1	2006	5	9	4	2	3	55.6	0 - 0 - 1	0 - 0 - 0
9.	WGM	Wang Lei	CHN	4	1990, 1996–2000	25	32	21	8	3	78.1	2 - 1 - 1	2 - 0 - 0
10.	-	Wang Miao	CHN	1	1988	1½	2	1	1	0	75.0	0 - 0 - 0	0 - 0 - 0
11.	WGM	Wang Pin	CHN	4	1992, 1996–1998, 2002	21½	35	14	15	6	61.4	2 - 1 - 1	0 - 0 - 0
12.	WGM	Wang Yu	CHN	1	2006	1½	4	1	1	2	37.5	0 - 0 - 1	0 - 0 - 0
13.	WGM	Wu Mingqian	CHN	4	1980–1986	31	54	21	20	13	57.4	0 - 0 - 0	0 - 0 - 0
14.	GM	Xie Jun	CHN	8	1988–2000, 2004	67	94	50	34	10	71.3	3 - 1 - 3	0 - 1 - 3
15.	WGM	Xu Yuhua	CHN	3	2000–2004	21	31	15	12	4	67.7	3 - 0 - 0	0 - 0 - 0
16.	-	Zhao Lan	CHN	1	1984	3	5	2	2	1	60.0	0 - 0 - 0	0 - 0 - 0
17.	WGM	Zhao Xue	CHN	3	2002–2006	31	37	26	10	1	83.8	2 - 0 - 1	3 - 1 - 1
18.	GM	Zhu Chen	CHN	5	1994–2002	43½	59	34	19	6	73.7	3 - 1 - 1	4 - 1 - 0

== See also ==
- Chess in China

== Sources ==
- OlimpBase
