= Zhang Weida =

Chinese chess player (born 1949)

Personal information
- Born: 18 September 1949 (age 76) Ningbo, China

Chess career
- Country: China
- Title: FIDE Master (1989)
- FIDE rating: 2386 (April 2013)
- Peak rating: 2484 (July 2000)

Zhang Weida (Chinese: 张伟达; born 18 September 1949 in Ningbo) is a chess player and coach from China. A FIDE Master and Senior Trainer, he is best known for coaching the Chinese team to four consecutive gold medals at the Women's Chess Olympiad between 1998 and 2004.

== Playing career ==
=== Domestic play ===
Zhang Weida first competed in the Chinese Chess Championship in 1966. In the China Chess League, he represented Heilongjiang from 1978, Zhejiang from 1980, and Shanghai from the end of 1986.

=== International play ===
Zhang Weida played for the Chinese national chess team at the Chess Olympiad twice. In the 1978 Chess Olympiad in Buenos Aires, China's first appearance at the event, he won a silver medal playing on the second reserve board, scoring five wins and three draws with no losses. His appearance as China's lone reserve player at the 1982 Chess Olympiad in Lucerne was less successful, losing all three of his games. He earned the FIDE Master title in 1989.

== Coaching career ==
Zhang was deputy head coach of the national men's chess team from 1987 to 2017. In the 1991–1993 Women's World Chess Championship cycle, he coached Peng Zhaoqin, Wang Pin and Qin Kanying at the 1991 Interzonal, all of whom qualified for the Candidates tournament. He started as the head coach of the women's team in 1994, leading them to their first silver medal at the 1996 Chess Olympiad, and then four consecutive gold medals from 1998 to 2004. He has been licensed as a FIDE Senior Trainer since 2014.

== See also ==
- Chess in China
