= Wu Mingqian =

Chinese chess player

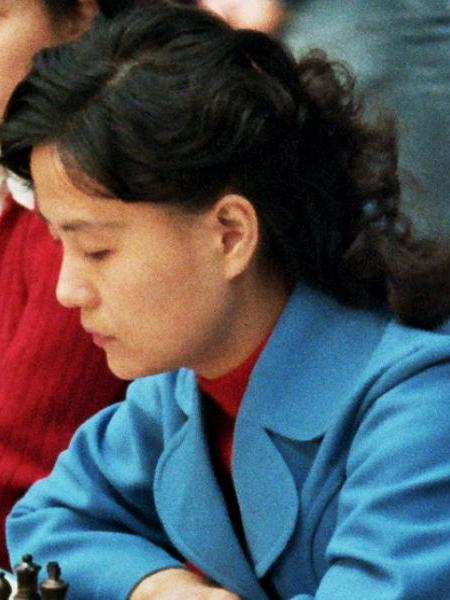
- Wu Mingqian, Lucerne 1982

Personal information
- Born: January 8, 1961 (age 65)

Chess career
- Country: China
- Title: Woman Grandmaster (1985)
- FIDE rating: 2175 [inactive]
- Peak rating: 2215 (January 1987)

Wu Mingqian (Chinese: 吴敏茜; born January 8, 1961) is a Chinese chess player who holds the title Woman Grandmaster, which she received from FIDE in 1985.

In 1985, Wu came second at the Women's Interzonal tournament in Zeleznovodsk with a final score of 10½/15. As a result, she qualified for the 1986 Women's Candidates Tournament, held in Malmö, where she came 8th (last) scoring 3/7. The following year, Wu came in 12th place at the Smederevska Palanka Interzonal tournament with a final score of 5½/15.

Wu competed for the China women's national chess team: four times at the Women's Chess Olympiad (1980–1986) with an overall record of 54 total games played (+21, =20, -13).

== See also ==
- Chess in China
