= Ye Rongguang =

Chinese chess grandmaster (born 1963)

Personal information
- Born: October 3, 1963 (age 63) Wenzhou, Zhejiang, China

Chess career
- Country: China
- Title: Grandmaster (1990)
- FIDE rating: 2461 (November 2026)
- Peak rating: 2545 (January 1991)
- Peak ranking: No. 96 (January 1991)

Ye Rongguang
- Traditional Chinese: 葉榮光
- Simplified Chinese: 叶荣光
Transcriptions
Standard Mandarin
- Hanyu Pinyin: Yè Róngguāng
- Wade–Giles: Ye Jung-kuang
- Yale Romanization: Yè Rúnggwāng
- IPA: [jê ɻʊ̌ŋkwáŋ]
Yue: Cantonese
- Yale Romanization: Yihp wìhng gwōng
- Jyutping: Jip6 wing4 gwong1
- IPA: [jɪ̀p wɪ̏ŋ kʷɔ́ːŋ]

Ye Rongguang (simplified Chinese: 叶荣光; traditional Chinese: 葉榮光; pinyin: Yè Róngguāng; born October 3, 1963) is a retired Chinese chess grandmaster. In 1990, he became the first ever Chinese chess player to gain the title of Grandmaster. He was for more than ten years the coach of women's world chess champion Zhu Chen.

== Career ==
Born in Wenzhou, Zhejiang, Ye Rongguang competed at the 1990 Interzonal Tournament in Manila, where he finished in 44th place scoring 6/13 points. In the same year he won the Chinese Chess Championship. He reached his highest FIDE rating of 2545 in January 1991, when he was ranked 97th in the world.

Ye has competed in the China national chess team in the Chess Olympiad three times (1988–92) (games played 35: +19 −5 =11), and twice at the World Team Chess Championships (1985–89) (games played 15: +8 −5 =2), winning bronze on 6th board in 1985. Ye also competed twice at the Asian Team Chess Championship (1987, 1991), with an overall record of 13 games (+11 −1 =1). He won an individual bronze medal and an individual gold in 1987 and 1991, respectively.

== Personal life ==
He lives in the Netherlands, and was appointed vice-chairman of the Netherlands Chinese Photographic Society. He is also a grandmaster in xiangqi.

Preceded by Ye Jiangchuan	Men's Chinese Chess Champion; 1990	Succeeded by Lin Weiguo
