= Li Xueyi =

Chinese chess player (born 1993)

Personal information
- Born: July 7, 1993 (age 33) Shenzhen, Guangdong

Chess career
- Country: China
- Title: Woman Grandmaster (2019)
- Peak rating: 2343 (August 2019)

Li Xueyi (Chinese: 李雪怡; pinyin: Li Xueyi; born July 7, 1993) is a Chinese chess player. She was awarded the title Woman Grandmaster (WGM) by FIDE in 2019.

== Biography ==
In 2025 Li Xueyi won the Women's Chinese Chess Championship. In 2025, in Linares she participated in Women's World Team Chess Championship and won bronze medal with China women's team.
