= Liang Jinrong =

Chinese chess grandmaster (born 1960)

Personal information
- Born: May 21, 1960 (age 66) Guangzhou, China

Chess career
- Country: China
- Title: Grandmaster (1997)
- FIDE rating: 2451 (July 2026)
- Peak rating: 2536 (January 2000)

Liang Jinrong (Chinese: 梁金荣; born May 21, 1960) is a Chinese chess Grandmaster.

In 1997, he became China's 7th Grandmaster.

He has played for Shandong chess club in the China Chess League.

== Career ==
He gained the GM title in 1997. He was National Chess Champion twice in 1995 and 2000.

He competed for the China national chess team for a total of seven times at the Chess Olympiads (1978–1986, 1990–1992) with an overall record of 70 games played (+23, =30, -17); one World Men's Team Chess Championship (1989) with an overall record of 3 games played (+0, =2, -1); and eight Men's Asian Team Chess Championships (1979–1983, 1987, 1991–1999) with an overall record of 41 games played (+25, =13, -3).

He reached his highest FIDE rating of 2536 in January 2000.

== See also ==
- Chess in China

Preceded by Ye Jiangchuan	Men's Chinese Chess Champion; 1995	Succeeded by Ye Jiangchuan
Preceded by Wang Zili	Men's Chinese Chess Champion; 2000	Succeeded by Zhang Zhong
