= Lu Shanglei =

Chinese chess grandmaster (born 1995)

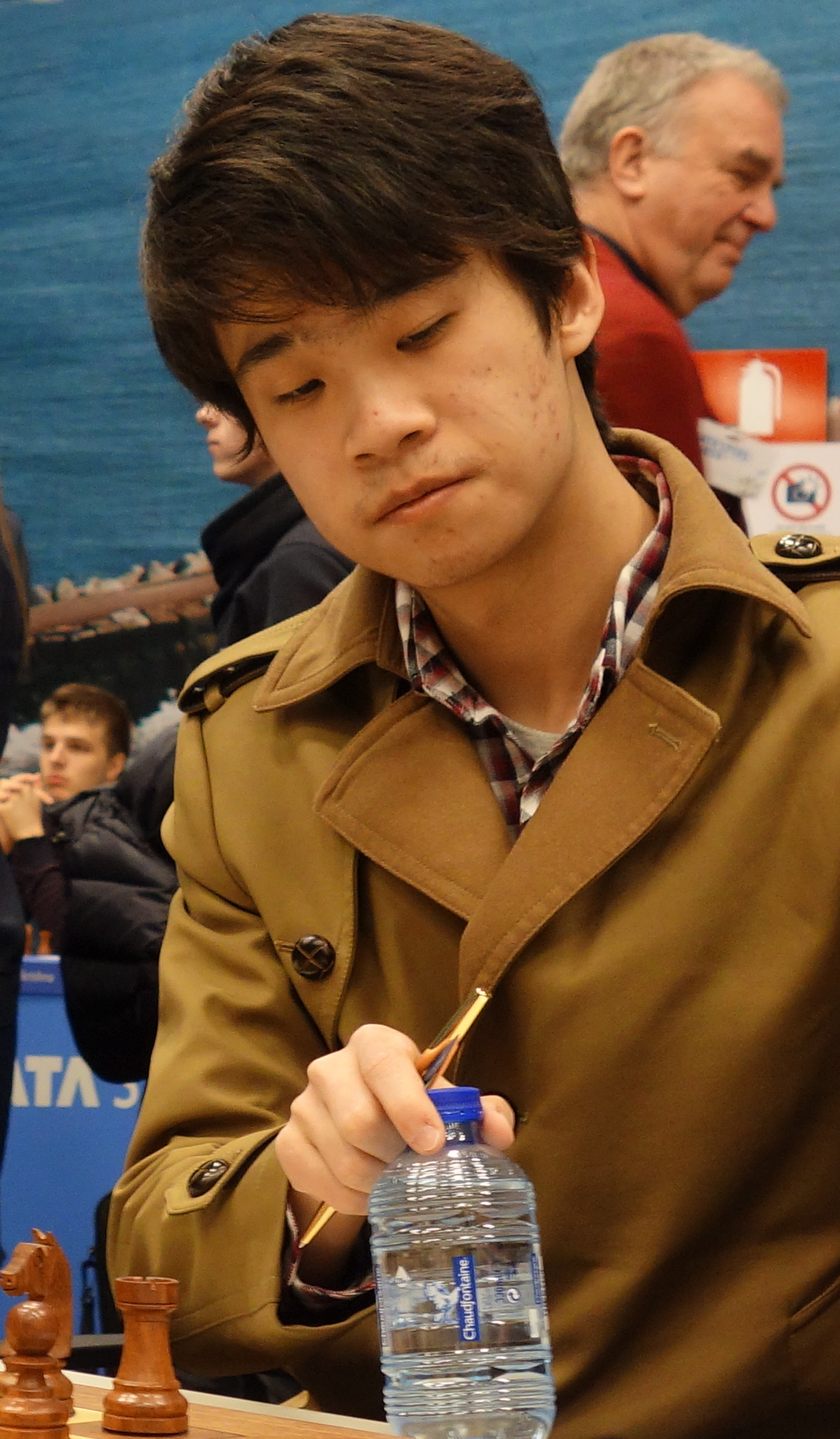
- Lu in 2017

Personal information
- Born: 10 July 1995 (age 30) Shenyang, Liaoning province

Chess career
- Country: China
- Title: Grandmaster (2011)
- FIDE rating: 2635 (July 2026)
- Peak rating: 2647 (May 2025)
- Ranking: No. 91 (July 2026)
- Peak ranking: No. 75 (March 2026)

Lu Shanglei (Chinese: 卢尚磊; born 10 July 1995) is a Chinese chess grandmaster and 2014 World Junior Chess Champion.

== Career ==
In 2010, Lu played on the Chinese team (alongside Yu Yangyi, Wang Chen, and Wang Jue) that won the 5th Vladimir Dvorkovich Cup, a junior team competition held in Moscow.

He was awarded by FIDE the title Grandmaster (GM) in October 2011. He achieved the norms required for the title in the same year at the Asian Individual Championship in Mashhad, Iran, and the 2nd Chairman Prospero A. Pichay Cup in the Subic Bay Freeport Zone, Philippines.

In August 2011, Lu came second, behind GM Li Shilong, at the 8th Dato' Arthur Tan Malaysia Open in Kuala Lumpur. The following year, he won the 1st Grand Europe Open in Golden Sands, Bulgaria.

In 2013, he played for the Chinese men's team in the China-USA Chess Summit in Ningbo, China. The match was won by the Chinese.

In June 2014, at the World Rapid and Blitz Chess Championships in Dubai, Lu was the only one who won a game against the eventual winner, Magnus Carlsen, in the blitz event. In October 2014, Lu won the World Junior Chess Championship in Pune, India with a score of 10/13 points. Thanks to this victory he qualified for the 2015 Chess World Cup. In the following month, he took part in the 8th Kings Tournament in Mediaș, Romania, a match between teams China and Romania held with the Scheveningen system. He was the top scorer in the inaugural blitz tournament with 6.5/9 points, and helped the Chinese team (made up of Lu, Ni Hua, Wang Yue, and Wei Yi) to win the match scoring 3/4 in the classical encounter.

In April 2015, he finished fourth at the Aeroflot Open in Moscow, and second at the Aeroflot blitz tournament. In June 2015, he won two blitz tournaments in Bulgaria, the Golden Sands Blitz and the Albena Blitz, both with a score of 9/11 points. In the subsequent month, Lu helped the Chinese team to win the 9th China-Russia Match, held with the Scheveningen system. At the Chess World Cup 2015 he knocked out Alexander Moiseenko and Wang Hao in rounds one and two respectively, then he was eliminated by Veselin Topalov in the third round after the first set of rapid tiebreaker games.

In 2016, Lu Shanglei won the Asian Blitz Championship in Tashkent and the Serbian Open.

In 2019, he won the Chinese Blitz Championship.

Lu plays for the Zhejiang team in the China Chess League.
