= Zhao Lan =

Chinese chess player

Personal information
- Born: July 1, 1963 (age 63)

Chess career
- Country: China
- Title: Woman International Master (1986)
- Peak rating: 2208 (July 2003)

Zhao Lan (Chinese: 赵兰; born July 1, 1963) is a Chinese chess Woman International Master. She was Women's National Chess Champion in 1982.

Zhao competed for the China national chess team at the 26th Chess Olympiad in 1984 with an overall record of 5 games played (+2, =2, -1).

== China Chess League ==
Zhao Lan played for Qingdao and Zhejiang chess clubs in the China Chess League (CCL).

== See also ==
- Chess in China

Preceded by Liu Shilan	Women's Chinese Chess Champion; 1982	Succeeded by Liu Shilan
