= Zhang Xiaowen (chess player) =

Chinese chess player

Personal information
- Born: 24 February 1989 (age 37) Shanghai, China

Chess career
- Country: China
- Title: Woman Grandmaster (2009)
- Peak rating: 2437 (January 2010)

Zhang Xiaowen (Chinese: 章晓雯; born 24 February 1989 in Shanghai) is a Chinese chess player who holds the FIDE title of Woman Grandmaster (WGM). She won the Asian Women's Continental Individual Championship which took place in May 2009 in Subic Bay Freeport Zone. In April 2011 she won the Chinese Women's Chess Championship. Her highest rating is 2437 as of March 2010.

Awards and achievements
Preceded by Tania Sachdev	Women's Asian Chess Champion; 2009	Succeeded by Atousa Pourkashiyan
