= Wang Jue =

Chinese chess player (born 1995)

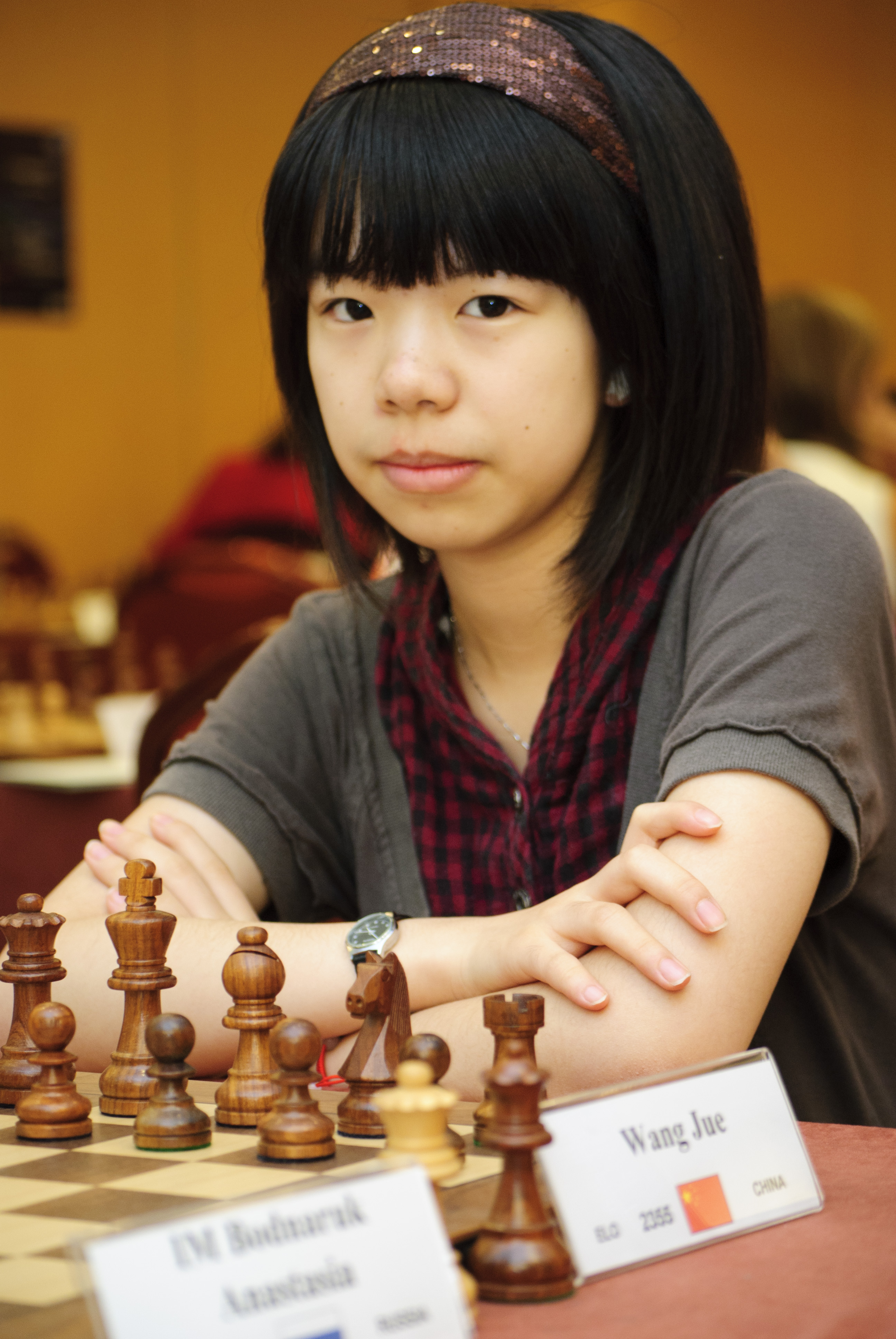
- Wang Jue, WChJ Athens 2012

Personal information
- Born: October 17, 1995 (age 30) Beijing, China

Chess career
- Country: China
- Title: Woman Grandmaster (2013)
- FIDE rating: 2426 (July 2026)
- Peak rating: 2426 (September 2019)

Wang Jue (born 17 October 1995 in Beijing) is a Chinese chess player, who holds the FIDE title of Woman Grandmaster.

She won the World Under-10 girls championship in 2005. In 2010 Wang was a member of the Chinese team (along with Yu Yangyi, Lu Shanglei and Wang Chen) which won the 5th Vladimir Dvorkovich Cup, a junior team competition held in Moscow.

She finished third in the Women's Chinese Chess Championship of 2011.

Wang Jue tied for first with Zhao Xue and Tan Zhongyi in the Asian Women's Blitz Championship of 2012, placing second on tiebreak. She won it in 2013 with a perfect score of 9/9. In 2015, she tied for first again in the same event, taking the bronze on tiebreak.

Wang competed in the Women's World Chess Championship 2015 losing in the first round to French Grandmaster Marie Sebag and thus being eliminated from the tournament.
