= Ding Yixin =

Chinese chess player (born 1991)

Personal information
- Born: April 26, 1991 (age 35) Shaoxing, Zhejiang, China

Chess career
- Country: China
- Title: Woman Grandmaster (2010)
- Peak rating: 2451 (July 2014)

Ding Yixin (Chinese: 丁亦昕; born April 26, 1991) is a Chinese chess player.

She earned the Woman Grandmaster title in 2010.

She played in the Women's World Chess Championship 2010, but went out in the first round.

She played no. 5 (reserve) in the Chinese women's chess team, which won the silver medal at the 40th Chess Olympiad in Istanbul in 2012.

She won the Women's Chinese Chess Championship in 2013, and the Women's Chinese Rapid Championship in 2019.
