= Lin Weiguo =

Chinese chess player (born 1970)

Personal information
- Born: July 25, 1970 (age 55) Hubei, China

Chess career
- Country: China
- Title: International Master (1992)
- Peak rating: 2469 (July 2000)

Lin Weiguo (Chinese: 林卫国; born July 25, 1970) is a Chinese IM-titled chess player. He was National Chess Champion three times in 1991, 1992 and 1997.

He competed for the China national chess team twice at the Chess Olympiads (1992–1994) with an overall record of 14 games played (+6, =5, -3); one World Men's Team Chess Championship (1993) with an overall record of 9 games played (+0, =5, -4); and two Men's Asian Team Chess Championships (1993–1995) with an overall record of 9 games played (+4, =1, -4).

== See also ==
- Chess in China

Preceded by Ye Rongguang	Men's Chinese Chess Champion; 1991, 1992	Succeeded by Tong Yuanming
Preceded by Ye Jiangchuan	Men's Chinese Chess Champion; 1997	Succeeded by Peng Xiaomin
