= Li Shongjian =

Chinese chess player (born 1939)

Personal information
- Born: January 29, 1939 (age 87)

Chess career
- Country: China
- Peak rating: 2300 (January 1990)

Li Shongjian (born 29 January 1939) is a Chinese chess player. He was a member of the Chinese national chess team. He was part of the national team at the Chess Olympiad in 1980 as second reserve. This was the second time China competed in this event. This was his only appearance.

== China Chess League ==
Li Shongjian played for Sichuan chess club in the Second Division of the China Chess League (CCL).

== See also ==
- Chess in China
