= Chang Tung Lo =

Chinese chess player

Chang Tung Lo is a Chinese chess player. He was a member of the Chinese national chess team. He competed at the Chess Olympiad in 1978, the first time China competed. This was his only appearance at this prestigious event and he played five games in total scoring 2 wins, 3 draws and no losses.

Chang had also competed for the national team at the Men's Asian Team Chess Championship - the most prestigious team chess tournament in Asia in the previous year in 1977. He played 6 games in all scoring 2 wins, 2 draws and 2 losses.

== See also ==
- Chess in China
