= Tan Chengxuan =

Chinese chess player (born 1963)

Personal information
- Born: July 3, 1963 (age 63)

Chess career
- Country: China
- Peak rating: 2415 (January 1996)

Tan Chengxuan (Chinese: 谭呈萱; born 3 July 1963) is a Chinese chess player.

He was a member of the Chinese national chess team. He was part of the national team at the Chess Olympiad in 1988. He played 1 game scoring 1 win, 0 draws and 0 losses.

His current (inactive) Elo rating is 2410 according to FIDE.

== China Chess League ==
Tan Chengxuan played for Guangdong chess club in the China Chess League (CCL).

== See also ==
- Chess in China
