= Tong Yuanming =

Chinese chess player (born 1972)

Personal information
- Born: April 21, 1972 (age 54) Zhenjiang, Jiangsu, China

Chess career
- Country: China
- Title: International Master (1994)
- FIDE rating: 2480 (November 2026)
- Peak rating: 2510 (January 2004)

Tong Yuanming
- Chinese: 童渊铭
Transcriptions
Standard Mandarin
- Hanyu Pinyin: Tóng Yuānmíng
- Wade–Giles: T'ung Yüan-ming
- Yale Romanization: Túng Ywānmíng
- IPA: [tʰʊ̌ŋ ɥɛ́nmǐŋ]
Yue: Cantonese
- Yale Romanization: Tùhng yyūn mìhng
- Jyutping: Tung4 jyun1 ming4
- IPA: [tʰʊ̏ŋ jýːn mɪ̏ŋ]

Tong Yuanming (Chinese: 童渊铭; pinyin: Tóng Yuānmíng; born April 21, 1972) is a Chinese chess player. He was National Chess Champion in 1993.

Tong Yuanming plays for Bank of Qingdao chess club in the China Chess League (CCL).

He is also a chess coach; some of his notable students include 1998 U14 World Youth Chess Champion Bu Xiangzhi (who also became the youngest grandmaster in history upon earning the title) and 2007 U10 World Youth Chess Champion Wang Tongsen.

== See also ==
- Chess in China

Preceded by Lin Weiguo	Men's Chinese Chess Champion; 1993	Succeeded by Ye Jiangchuan
