= Wang Lei (chess player) =

Chinese chess player

Personal information
- Born: February 4, 1975 (age 51) Shanghai, China

Chess career
- Country: China
- Title: Woman Grandmaster (1996)
- FIDE rating: 2484 (July 2026)
- Peak rating: 2512 (October 2001)
- Peak ranking: No. 5 woman (October 2001)

Wang Lei (Chinese: 王蕾; pinyin: Wáng Lěi; born February 4, 1975) is a Chinese chess player holding the title of Woman Grandmaster. She was in the FIDE Top 50 Women rating list from 2000 to 2003. Wang is a four-time Chinese women's champion (1997, 1998, 2000, 2001). In 1996 she won the Women's World University Chess Championship in León, Spain.

Wang competed for the China national chess team four times at the Women's Chess Olympiads (1990, 1996, 1998, 2000) with an overall record of 32 games played (+21, =8, -3), and once at the Women's Asian Team Chess Championship (1999) with an overall record of 4 games played (+3, =0, -1). She was also on the Chinese women's team in the first China - Russia Chess Summit.

Preceded by Zhu Chen; Qin Kanying	Women's Chinese Chess Champion; 1997, 1998; 2000, 2001	Succeeded by Qin Kanying; Wang Pin
