= Xu Jun =

Chinese chess grandmaster (born 1962)

Personal information
- Born: September 17, 1962 (age 63) Suzhou, Jiangsu, China

Chess career
- Country: China
- Title: Grandmaster (1994)
- FIDE rating: 2439 (July 2026)
- Peak rating: 2668 (July 2000)
- Peak ranking: No. 22 (July 2000)

Xu Jun (Chinese: 徐俊; pinyin: Xú Jùn; born September 17, 1962) is a Chinese chess player. He was awarded the title of Grandmaster by FIDE in 1994, becoming the fourth from China.

== Biography ==
Born in Suzhou, Jiangsu, Xu was champion of China in 1983 and 1985. He has been a member of the Chinese Olympiad team, a five times winner of the Asia Team Championship (1983–2003), the 1987 3.3 Zonal champion, the 1998 champion of China Open; the 2000–2001 champion of Asia, and was a 2002 Chess Olympiad member of Chinese team which came 5th in the final standings.

In 2012, he was awarded the title of FIDE Senior Trainer.

== China Chess League ==
Xu Jun plays for Jiangsu chess club in the China Chess League (CCL).

Preceded by Liu Wenzhe	Men's Chinese Chess Champion; 1983	Succeeded by Ye Jiangchuan
Preceded by Ye Jiangchuan	Men's Chinese Chess Champion; 1985	Succeeded by Ye Jiangchuan
