= Peng Xiaomin =

Chinese chess grandmaster (born 1973)

Personal information
- Born: April 8, 1973 (age 53) Handan, Hebei
- Spouse: Qin Kanying

Chess career
- Country: China
- Title: Grandmaster (1996)
- FIDE rating: 2591 (July 2026)
- Peak rating: 2657 (July 2000)
- Peak ranking: No. 29 (July 2000)

Peng Xiaomin (Chinese: 彭小民; pinyin: Péng Xiǎomín; born April 8, 1973) is a Chinese chess grandmaster. In 1997, he became China's 6th Grandmaster. Peng Xiaomin is married to WGM Qin Kanying.

== Career ==
Peng has been a grandmaster since 1997. In 1998, he became the Chinese National Chess Champion.

He played for the China national Olympiad team for 1994-2000.

Peng competed in the FIDE World Chess Championship in 2000 in New Delhi, where he reached the third round having been beaten by Peter Svidler 2.5-1.5.

Peng was a World Top 100 Chess Player according to the FIDE ratings from July 2000 to October 2002, while also at the same time was the third ranked Chinese player.

Although today he is still officially in the Top 10 in China, he has limited his activities to playing for and coaching his club team in the domestic Chinese chess league.

Recently, he has moved to Canada with his wife and son. He is teaching Kelly Wang, Qiuyu Huang, Robert Liu, Zhong Wen Xuan, and other young Canadians.

== China Chess League ==
Peng Xiaomin plays for Hebei chess club in the China Chess League (CCL).

== See also ==
- Chess in China

Preceded by Lin Weiguo	Men's Chinese Chess Champion; 1998	Succeeded by Wang Zili
