= Yin Hao (chess player) =

Chinese chess player

Personal information
- Born: 1979 (age 46–47)

Chess career
- Country: China
- Title: International Master (1998)
- FIDE rating: 2583 (July 2026) [inactive]
- Peak rating: 2583 (April 2003)

Yin Hao (Chinese: 殷昊; born 1979) is a Chinese International Master former chess player. He is currently the Rating Officer for the Chinese Chess Association and is a qualified International Arbiter (2002).

== Chess career ==
Yin competed for the China national chess team once at the Chess Olympiads (1996) with an overall record of two games played (+1 −0 =1), and once for the "B team" at the Men's Asian Team Chess Championship (1999) with an overall record of five games played (+1 −1 =3).

== China Chess League ==
Yin Hao has played for Jiangsu chess club in the China Chess League (CCL).

== See also ==
- Chess in China
