= Wang Zili =

Chinese chess grandmaster (born 1968)

Personal information
- Born: June 14, 1968 (age 58) Bozhou, Anhui

Chess career
- Country: China
- Title: Grandmaster (1995)
- FIDE rating: 2488 (July 2026)
- Peak rating: 2603 (July 2000)
- Peak ranking: No. 86 (July 2000)

Wang Zili (Chinese: 汪自力; Pinyin: Wāng Zìlì; born June 14, 1968) is a retired Chinese chess player. He was awarded the title Grandmaster by FIDE in 1995, becoming the fifth from China.

== Career ==
Wang gained the grandmaster title in 1995. He was twice national champion, in 1988 and 1999. He participated for the China national chess team in five Chess Olympiads (1988–1996) with an overall record of 52 games played (+23, =18, -11); one World Men's Team Chess Championship (1989) with an overall record of 9 games played (+3, =2, -4); and three Asian Team Chess Championships (1991–1995) with an overall record of 24 games played (+14, =8, -2). In 1997 Wang qualified for the FIDE World Chess Championship knockout tournament in Groningen. He was beaten in the first round by Utut Adianto.

He reached his highest FIDE rating of 2603 in July 2000, when he was ranked worldwide at 86th.

| Preceded by Ye Jiangchuan | Men's Chinese Chess Champion; 1988 | Succeeded by Ye Jiangchuan |
| Preceded by Peng Xiaomin | Men's Chinese Chess Champion; 1999 | Succeeded by Liang Jinrong |
