= Wang Yu (chess player) =

Chinese chess player (born 1982)

Personal information
- Born: 19 November 1982 (age 43) Tianjin, China

Chess career
- Country: China
- Title: International Master (2007); Woman Grandmaster (2003)
- Peak rating: 2438 (October 2000)

Wang Yu (Chinese: 王瑜; born 19 November 1982 in Tianjin) is a Chinese chess player who holds the FIDE titles of International Master (IM) and Woman Grandmaster (WGM).

== Chess career ==
In 1996, Wang won the World Under-14 Girls Championship and in 1998, won the World U16 Girls Championship. In 1999, she won the Asian Junior Girls' Championship in Vũng Tàu. Wang finished runner-up at the World Under-18 Girls Championship of 2000.

Wang Yu won the Asian Women's Chess Championship of 2004 in Beirut. In 2005, she won the Chinese Women's Chess Championship.

== National team ==
Wang played for the B team in 1999 and for the first team in 2003 at the Women's Asian Team Chess Championship (overall record is 11 games: +6, =2, -3). She also played for the Chinese women's team at the World Team Chess Championship in Beersheba (overall record was 6 games:+0, =2, -4). In 2006 Wang Yu was a member of the Chinese team which won the bronze medal at the Women's 37th Chess Olympiad (played 4 games in total: +1, =1, -2).

Wang was part of the women's team in the 2007 China-Russia Summit Match.

== IM title ==
In 2007, she gained the International Master (IM) title. She achieved her IM norms at:

- Tan Chin Nam Cup International GM Open in Qingdao, China (July 4–8, 2002); score 4.0/9
- Aeroflot Open 2004 B Group in Moscow, Russia (February 16–26, 2004); score 5.5/9
- Dubai Open 2005 in Dubai, UAE (April 4–12, 2005); score 5.0/9

== WGM title ==
In 2003, she gained the Woman Grandmaster (WGM) title. She achieved her WGM norms at:

- China Women's Ch. in Suzhou, China (March–April 2001); score 6.0/9
- 9th Asian Women's Ch. in Chennai, India (Sept 2001); score 7.0/9
- Tan Chin Nam Cup GM in Qingdao (July 2002); score 4.0/9

== China Chess League ==
Wang Yu plays for Beijing chess club in the China Chess League (CCL).

== See also ==
- Chess in China

Awards and achievements
Preceded by Humpy Koneru	Women's Asian Chess Champion; 2004	Succeeded by Tania Sachdev
Preceded by Qin Kanying	Women's Chinese Chess Champion; 2005	Succeeded by Li Ruofan
