= Li Shilong =

Chinese chess grandmaster (born 1977)

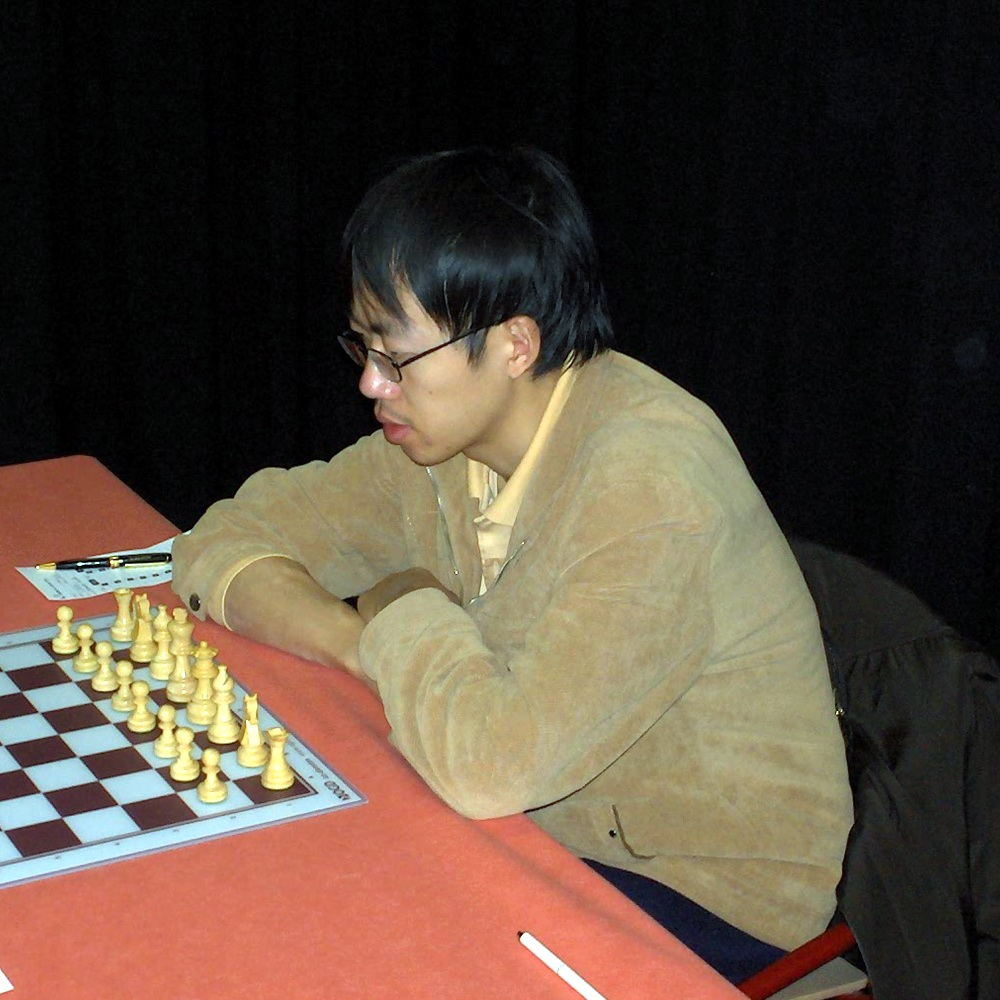
- Li in 2008

Personal information
- Born: August 10, 1977 (age 49) Guangzhou, China

Chess career
- Country: China
- Title: Grandmaster (2002)
- Peak rating: 2561 (November 2012)

Li Shilong (simplified Chinese: 李师龙; traditional Chinese: 李師龍; pinyin: Lǐ Shīlóng; born August 10, 1977) is a Chinese chess Grandmaster. In 2002, he became China's 14th Grandmaster.

== Chess career ==
In 2005 at the 5th Asian Chess Championship in Hyderabad, India, he came second with 7.5/9 points behind Zhang Zhong. He has competed in numerous tournaments, including the Amsterdam tournament, Groningen Chess Festival, Corus tournament, Aeroflot Open, Noteboom Memorial, Cappelle-la-Grande Open and the Chinese Chess Championship, besides others.

In September 2008, Li won the 4th Prospero Pichay Cup in a field of eighteen grandmasters at the Duty Free Fiesta Mall in Parañaque. He scored 7½/9 with one point clear from the rest of the field.

In 2011 he won the 8th IGB Dato' Arthur Tan Malaysia Open in Kuala Lumpur.

== See also ==
- Chess in China
