= Ye Jiangchuan =

Chinese chess grandmaster (born 1960)

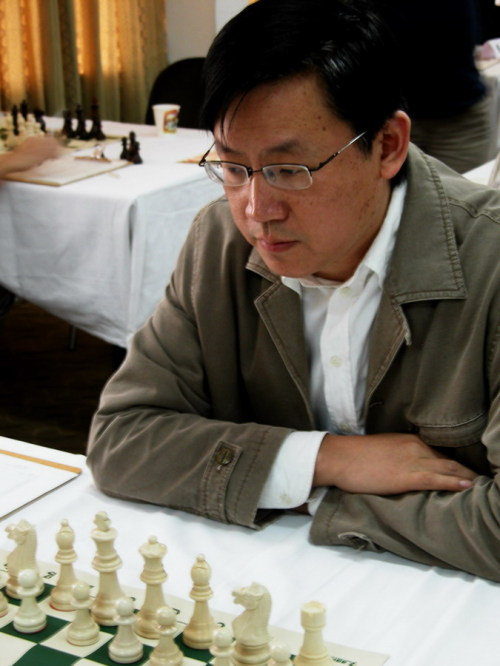

Personal information
- Born: November 20, 1960 (age 65) Wuxi, Jiangsu

Chess career
- Country: China
- Title: Grandmaster (1993)
- FIDE rating: 2585 (September 2026)
- Peak rating: 2684 (April 2003)
- Peak ranking: No. 17 (October 2000)

Ye Jiangchuan
- Traditional Chinese: 葉江川
- Simplified Chinese: 叶江川
Transcriptions
Standard Mandarin
- Hanyu Pinyin: Yè Jiāngchuān
- Wade–Giles: Ye Jiang-chuan
- Yale Romanization: Yè Jyāngchwān
- IPA: [jê tɕjáŋʈʂʰwán]
Yue: Cantonese
- Yale Romanization: Yihp gong chyun
- Jyutping: Jip6 gong1 cyun1
- IPA: [jɪ̀p kɔ́ːŋ tɕʰýːn]

Ye Jiangchuan (Chinese: 叶江川; Pinyin; Yè Jiāngchuān; born November 20, 1960) is a Chinese chess grandmaster. He is the second Chinese player, after Ye Rongguang, to achieve the title of Grandmaster, which FIDE awarded him in 1993. On 1 January 2000, he became the first ever Chinese player to cross the 2600 elo rating mark.

== Career ==
Born in Wuxi, Jiangsu, Ye learned chess when he was 17 years old, and at 20 he became national champion of China. He has altogether won the Chinese Chess Championship seven times (1981, 1984, 1986, 1987, 1989, 1994, 1996).

Ye has represented his country at numerous Chess Olympiads and Asian Team Chess Championships. He has been four times member of the Asia Team champions, a 12 times Olympiad participant. In his first appearance, in 1982, Ye won the individual silver medal on board four. His best team result in an Olympiad was in 1998 in Elista, where he was on the first board as the national team finished in fifth place.

Ye was 1995 and 1999 Champion of Dato' Tan Chin Nam Cup, and 2001 co-champion of same cup. He reached the 4th round (9–16th place) in the 2001 FIDE World Championship, where he was eliminated by Vassily Ivanchuk by ½–1½. He also reached the quarter-finals in the 2000 and 2002 FIDE World Cup.

Ye has played less frequently after becoming the chief coach of the Chinese national teams (men and women) in 2000. He was awarded the title of FIDE Senior Trainer in 2005. Ye's highest world ranking was 17th in October 2000 and he had been consistently in the top 25 from 2000 to 2004.

== China Chess League ==
Ye Jiangchuan plays for Beijing chess club in the China Chess League (CCL).

Preceded by Liu Wenzhe	Men's Chinese Chess Champion; 1981	Succeeded by Liu Wenzhe
Preceded by Xu Jun	Men's Chinese Chess Champion; 1984	Succeeded by Xu Jun
Preceded by Xu Jun	Men's Chinese Chess Champion; 1986, 1987	Succeeded by Wang Zili
Preceded by Wang Zili	Men's Chinese Chess Champion; 1989	Succeeded by Ye Rongguang
Preceded by Tong Yuanming	Men's Chinese Chess Champion; 1994	Succeeded by Liang Jinrong
Preceded by Liang Jinrong	Men's Chinese Chess Champion; 1996	Succeeded by Lin Weiguo
