= Peng Zhaoqin =

Chinese-Dutch chess grandmaster (born 1968)

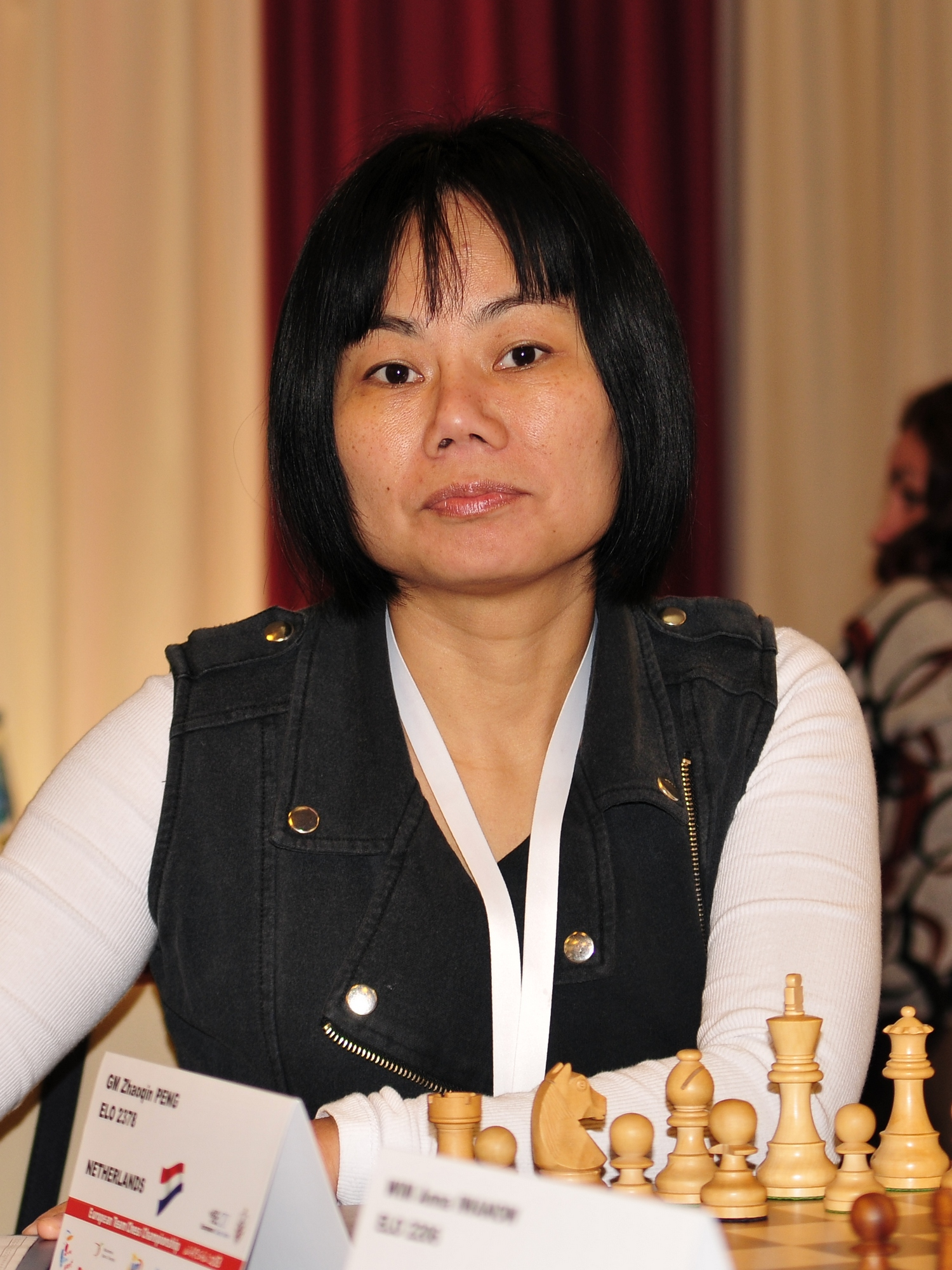
- Peng Zhaoqin, Warsaw 2013

Personal information
- Born: 8 May 1968 (age 58) Guangzhou, Guangdong, China

Chess career
- Country: China (until 1996); Netherlands (since 1996)
- Title: Grandmaster (2004)
- FIDE rating: 2350 (December 2021)
- Peak rating: 2472 (April 2002)

Peng Zhaoqin (Chinese: 彭肇勤; pinyin: Péng Zhàoqín; born 8 May 1968 in Guangzhou, Guangdong) is a Chinese-born Dutch chess player. In October 2004, she was the eleventh woman ever to be awarded the FIDE title of Grandmaster.

She won three times the Chinese women's chess championship, in 1987, 1990 and 1993. She has resided in the Netherlands since 1996. Peng has won the Dutch women's championship an unprecedented fourteen times, landing her first title in 1997 and then winning twelve more in an uninterrupted sequence from 2000 to 2011. She tied for first with Alexandra Kosteniuk at the European Women's Chess Championship of 2004 in Dresden, and took the silver medal on tiebreak. Thanks to this result, Peng was awarded the title of Grandmaster.

In the 2011 Dutch women's championship, Peng won nine games out of ten, placing a full three points ahead of her closest competitor.

== See also ==
- Chess in China

Achievements
| Preceded by Liu Shilan | Women's Chinese Chess Champion; 1987 | Succeeded by Qin Kanying |
| Preceded by Xie Jun | Women's Chinese Chess Champion; 1990 | Succeeded by Qin Kanying |
| Preceded by Zhu Chen | Women's Chinese Chess Champion; 1993 | Succeeded by Zhu Chen |
