= Chinese Chess Championship =

Annual national chess championship of China

The Chinese Chess Championship is the annual individual national chess championship of China.

== History ==
In 1956, chess officially became a competitive sport in China. The National Championship began the next year. Chess competitions were suspended during the Cultural Revolution. The first Women's Championship was held in 1979. The Chinese Chess Association was founded in 1986. Since 2009, the highest-level individual Group A competition has been held regularly in Xinghua, Jiangsu, known as the "Hometown of Chinese Chess".

=== 2025 championship ===
The 2025 edition was held from June 26 to July 3 for the 17th consecutive year in Xinghua, Jiangsu, which happens to be the hometown of Hou Yifan. It was an 11-round Swiss tournament adopted an 11-round Swiss system format, with a total prize fund of 500,000 RMB - 120,000 RMB for the Open champion and 80,000 RMB to the Women's champion. The sections had 60 and 34 participants respectively. Notably, GM Xiao Tong won the open event with a score of 8/11 two months off the back of his win in the China New Stars tournament. WGM Li Xueyi won the women's event.

== Winners ==
The following is a list of the winners of the Chinese Chess Championships:

Year	Champion	Women's Champion
1957	Zhang Fujiang	
1958	Xu Jialiang	
1959	Deng Wenxiang	
1960	Xu Tianli	
1962	Xu Tianli	
1962 (2)	??	
1964	Jian Mingji	
1965	Huang Xinzhai	
1966	Zhang Donglu	
1974	Chen De	
1975	Qi Jingxuan	
1977	Chen De	
1978	Qi Jingxuan	
1979	Li Zunian	Liu Shilan
1979(2)	--	Liu Shilan
1980	Liu Wenzhe	Liu Shilan
1980(2)	--	Liu Shilan
1981	Ye Jiangchuan	Liu Shilan
1982	Liu Wenzhe	Zhao Lan
1983	Xu Jun	Liu Shilan
1984	Ye Jiangchuan	Liu Shilan
1985	Xu Jun	Liu Shilan
1986	Ye Jiangchuan	Liu Shilan
1987	Ye Jiangchuan	Peng Zhaoqin
1988	Wang Zili	Qin Kanying
1989	Ye Jiangchuan	Xie Jun
1990	Ye Rongguang	Peng Zhaoqin
1991	Lin Weiguo	Qin Kanying
1992	Lin Weiguo	Zhu Chen
1993	Tong Yuanming	Peng Zhaoqin
1994	Ye Jiangchuan	Zhu Chen
1995	Liang Jinrong	Qin Kanying
1996	Ye Jiangchuan	Zhu Chen
1997	Lin Weiguo	Wang Lei
1998	Peng Xiaomin	Wang Lei
1999	Wang Zili	Qin Kanying
2000	Liang Jinrong	Wang Lei
2001	Zhang Zhong	Wang Lei
2002	Zhang Pengxiang	Wang Pin
2003	Zhang Zhong	Xu Yuanyuan
2004	Bu Xiangzhi	Qin Kanying
2005	Wang Yue	Wang Yu
2006	Ni Hua	Li Ruofan
2007	Ni Hua	Hou Yifan
2008	Ni Hua	Hou Yifan
2009	Ding Liren	Shen Yang
2010	Wang Hao	Ju Wenjun
2011	Ding Liren	Zhang Xiaowen
2012	Ding Liren	Huang Qian
2013	Wang Yue	Ding Yixin
2014	Yu Yangyi	Ju Wenjun
2015	Wei Yi	Tan Zhongyi
2016	Wei Yi	Guo Qi
2017	Wei Yi	Lei Tingjie
2018	Wen Yang	Zhai Mo
2019	Lu Shanglei	Zhu Jiner
2020	Yu Yangyi	Tan Zhongyi
2021	Yu Yangyi	Tan Zhongyi
2022	Dai Changren	Tan Zhongyi
2023	Li Di	Guo Qi
2024	Wang Yue	Lu Miaoyi
2025	Xiao Tong	Li Xueyi
2026	Xu Xiangyu	Yan Tianqi

== Women's Crosstables ==
CHN-ch (Women) Xinghua Jiangsu 2012
	Player	Rating	1	2	3	4	5	6	7	8	9	0	1	2	Points	TB	Perf.	+/-
1	Huang Qian (China)	2399	*	½	1	½	½	½	½	1	1	1	½	1	8	40.00	2487	+ 14
2	Zhang Xiaowen (China)	2354	½	*	½	½	½	½	1	1	1	½	1	1	8	39	2492	+21
3	Ju Wenjun (China)	2557	0	½	*	½	1	½	1	½	½	½	1	1	7		2401	-17
4	Wang Yu (China)	2372	½	½	½	*	½	½	0	½	1	1	½	1	6½	31.50	2383	+3
5	Guo Qi (China)	2351	½	½	0	½	*	½	1	½	0	1	1	1	6½	31.50	2385	+6
6	Tan Zhongyi (China)	2438	½	½	½	½	½	*	½	½	½	1	½	½	6	32.00	2346	-12
7	Wang Jue (China)	2366	½	0	0	1	0	½	*	0	1	1	1	1	6	26.00	2353	-1
8	Ding Yixin (China)	2350	0	0	½	½	½	½	1	*	1	½	½	½	5½		2322	-4
9	Nie Xin (China)	2053	0	0	½	0	1	½	0	0	*	½	½	1	4	18.00	2251	+22
10	Gu Xiaobing (China)	2369	0	½	½	0	0	0	0	½	½	*	1	1	4	16.75	2234	-4
11	Wang Xiaohui (China)	2209	½	0	0	½	0	½	0	½	½	0	*	½	3		2165	-7
12	Wang Doudou (China)	2186	0	0	0	0	0	½	0	½	0	0	½	*	1½		2017	-19

Average Elo: 2324 <=> Cat: 3

m = 6.60

CHN-ch (Women) Xinghua Jiangsu 2011
	Player	Rating	1	2	3	4	5	6	7	8	9	0	1	2	Points	TB	Perf.	+/-
1	Zhang Xiaowen (China)	2344	*	1	½	½	1	½	1	1	½	½	1	1	8½		2598	+36
2	Zhao Xue (China)	2495	0	*	½	1	1	1	1	0	1	1	½	1	8		2542	+7
3	Wang Jue (China)	2275	½	½	*	½	0	0	1	½	1	1	½	1	6½	31.25	2456	+27
4	Wang Yu (China)	2398	½	0	½	*	½	½	0	½	1	1	1	1	6½	29.25	2444	+8
5	Tan Zhongyi (China)	2428	0	0	1	½	*	0	1	½	½	1	1	1	6½	29.00	2442	+3
6	Ju Wenjun (China)	2519	½	0	1	½	1	*	0	½	½	0	1	1	6	29.75	2402	-16
7	Guo Qi (China)	2331	0	0	0	1	0	1	*	1	½	1	½	1	6	26.50	2418	+13
8	Huang Qian (China)	2394	0	1	½	½	½	½	0	*	½	1	½	0	5		2350	-7
9	Shen Yang (China)	2443	½	0	0	0	½	½	½	½	*	0	1	1	4½		2314	-20
10	Gu Xiaobing (China)	2369	½	0	0	0	0	1	0	0	1	*	½	1	4		2287	-13
11	Ding Yixin (China)	2376	0	½	½	0	0	0	½	½	0	½	*	1	3½		2251	-19
12	Xu Tong (China)	2217	0	0	0	0	0	0	0	1	0	0	0	*	1		1998	-20

Average Elo: 2382 <=> Cat: 6

m = 6.60

CHN-ch (Women) Xinghua 2010
	Player	Rating	1	2	3	4	5	6	7	8	9	0	1	2	Points	TB	Perf.	+/-
1	Ju Wenjun (China)	2500	*	½	0	½	1	½	1	1	½	1	1	1	8		2531	+6
2	Huang Qian (China)	2437	½	*	0	½	1	1	½	1	½	½	1	1	7½		2499	+10
3	Tan Zhongyi (China)	2464	1	1	*	0	0	½	1	0	1	½	1	1	7		2462	+1
4	Wang Yu (China)	2337	½	½	1	*	½	½	½	½	1	½	½	½	6½		2439	+16
5	Ding Yixin (China)	2327	0	0	1	½	*	0	0	1	½	1	1	1	6		2408	+12
6	Zhao Xue (China)	2493	½	0	½	½	1	*	0	0	0	1	1	1	5½		2362	-18
7	Wang Jue (China)	2180	0	½	0	½	1	1	*	1	½	0	0	1	5	27.25	2358	+23
8	Zhang Xiaowen (China)	2426	0	0	1	½	0	1	0	*	0	1	1	½	5	25.25	2337	-13
9	Gu Xiaobing (China)	2361	½	½	0	0	½	1	½	1	*	0	0	½	4½	25.25	2310	-8
10	Shen Yang (China)	2452	0	½	½	½	0	0	1	0	1	*	½	½	4½	23.25	2302	-22
11	Wang Doudou (China)	2216	0	0	0	½	0	0	1	0	1	½	*	½	3½		2254	+4
12	Zhang Jilin (China)	2280	0	0	0	½	0	0	½	½	½	½	½	*	3		2211	-10

Average Elo: 2372 <=> Cat: 5

m = 7.04

CHN-ch (Women) Xinghua Jiangsu 2009
	Player	Rating	1	2	3	4	5	6	7	8	9	0	1	2	Points	TB	Perf.	+/-
1	Shen Yang (China)	2420	*	½	½	1	½	½	1	1	1	1	1	1	9		2600	+23
2	Zhao Xue (China)	2531	½	*	1	1	0	½	½	1	1	1	1	1	8½		2542	+2
3	Tan Zhongyi (China)	2436	½	0	*	1	½	1	1	½	1	1	1	1	8		2508	+11
4	Zhang Xiaowen (China)	2340	0	0	½	*	1	½	1	0	1	1	1	1	7		2444	+16
5	Wang Yu (China)	2364	½	1	0	0	*	1	½	½	½	1	1	½	6½	32.00	2408	+7
6	Ju Wenjun (China)	2454	½	½	½	½	0	*	½	½	½	1	1	1	6½	29.25	2401	-7
7	Gu Xiaobing (China)	2336	0	½	0	0	½	½	*	1	1	½	1	1	6		2378	+7
8	Ding Yixin (China)	2281	0	0	0	1	½	½	0	*	1	½	1	1	5½		2352	+10
9	Wang Xiaohui (China)	2265	0	0	½	0	½	½	0	0	*	½	½	1	3½		2222	-7
10	Zhang Jilin (China)	2335	0	0	0	0	0	0	½	½	½	*	½	½	2½		2135	-28
11	Xu Tong (China)	2231	0	0	0	0	0	0	0	0	½	½	*	1	2		2096	-17
12	Wang Jue (China)	2162	0	0	0	0	½	0	0	0	0	½	0	*	1		1963	-18

Average Elo: 2346 <=> Cat: 4

CHN-ch (Women) Beijing 2008
	Player	Rating	1	2	3	4	5	6	7	8	9	0	1	2	Points	TB	Perf.	+/-
1	Hou Yifan (China)	2549	*	½	½	½	½	1	1	1	1	1	1	1	9		2598	+7
2	Zhao Xue (China)	2523	½	*	0	1	1	1	0	½	½	1	1	1	7½		2473	-5
3	Shen Yang (China)	2439	½	1	*	½	½	½	1	1	1	0	0	1	7		2444	+2
4	Zhang Xiaowen (China)	2361	½	0	½	*	½	1	0	0	1	1	½	1	6		2386	+4
5	Ju Wenjun (China)	2374	½	0	½	½	*	0	½	1	½	½	1	½	5½	28.50	2354	-3
6	Gu Xiaobing (China)	2225	0	0	½	0	1	*	1	1	0	1	½	½	5½	26.75	2367	+20
7	Zhang Jilin (China)	2361	0	1	0	1	½	0	*	0	½	1	½	1	5½	26.25	2355	-1
8	Tan Zhongyi (China)	2353	0	½	0	1	0	0	1	*	½	½	1	1	5½	25.25	2355	0
9	Wang Yu (China)	2387	0	½	0	0	½	1	½	½	*	½	½	1	5		2321	-10
10	Ding Yixin (China)	2292	0	0	1	0	½	0	0	½	½	*	1	½	4	19.75	2264	-5
11	Xu Tong (China)	2188	0	0	1	½	0	½	½	0	½	0	*	1	4	19.50	2273	+10
12	Wang Xiaohui (China)	2211	0	0	0	0	½	½	0	0	0	½	0	*	1½		2048	-18

Average Elo: 2355 <=> Cat: 5

m = 7.04

CHN-ch (Women) Wuxi 2006
	Player	Rating	1	2	3	4	5	6	7	8	9	0	1	2	Points	TB	Perf.	+/-
1	Li Ruofan (China)	2391	*	½	½	½	½	1	1	½	1	1	1	1	8½		2579	+26
2	Wang Pin (China)	2393	½	*	½	1	½	1	½	½	½	½	1	1	7½		2499	+16
3	Zhao Xue (China)	2423	½	½	*	1	0	½	½	1	1	1	1	0	7		2461	+6
4	Hou Yifan (China)	2298	½	0	0	*	1	1	½	1	½	½	1	1	7		2472	+27
5	Ruan Lufei (China)	2370	½	½	1	0	*	0	½	½	½	½	½	1	5½	28.50	2369	0
6	Gu Xiaobing (China)	2371	0	0	½	0	1	*	1		1	1	½	½	5½	26.75	2369	0
7	Huang Qian (China)	2391	0	½	½	½	½	0	*	½	½	½	1	1	5½	26.25	2367	-4
8	Ju Wenjun (China)	2330	½	½	0	0	½	1	½	*	0	½	½	1	5	25.25	2340	+2
9	Shen Yang (China)	2411	0	½	0	½	½	0	½	1	*	½	½	1	5		2334	-12
10	Wang Yu (China)	2390	0	½	0	½	½	0	½	½	½	*	½	½	4	19.75	2270	-19
11	Kuang Yinghui (China)	2303	0	0	0	0	½	½	0	½	½	½	*	½	3	19.50	2205	-14
12	Gong Qianyun (China)	2355	0	0	1	0	0	½	0	0	0	½	½	*	2½		2158	-28

Average Elo: 2368 <=> Cat: 5

m = 7.04

== See also ==
- Chess in China
