= China national chess team results =

This article details the results of the China national chess team.

== Chess Olympiads ==
China has competed at the every Chess Olympiad since the 23rd edition in 1978.

== Asian Chess Games ==
=== Overall statistics ===
Appearances	Years	Points	Games played	Match points	Matches played	Games			Matches			% (Points/Games played)	Team medals won	Individual medals won
1	2006	17½	27	13	9	+14	=7	-6	+6	=1	-2	64.8	0 - 1 - 0	0 - 0 - 1

=== Yearly statistics ===
Year	Final position	ELO team	Points	Games played	Match points	Matches played	Games			Matches			% (Points/Games played)	ELO opposition average	ELO performance rating	Individual medals
2006	2.	2594	17½	27	13	9	+14	=7	-6	+6	=1	-2	64.8	2459	2569	0 - 0 - 1

== Asian Indoor Games ==
=== Overall statistics ===
Appearances	Years	Points	Games played	Match points	Matches played	Games			Matches			% (Points/Games played)	Team medals won	Individual medals won
1	2007	18½	24	11	6	+15	=7	-2	+5	=1	-0	77.1	1 - 0 - 0	2 - 0 - 0

=== Yearly statistics ===
Year	Final position	ELO team	Points	Games played	Match points	Matches played	Games			Matches			% (Points/Games played)	ELO opposition average	ELO performance rating	Individual medals
2007	1.	2627	18½	24	11	6	+15	=7	-2	+5	=1	-0	77.1	2379	2590	2 - 0 - 0

=== 2007 ===
In October 2007, China won the gold medal in the "classic chess mixed team" event of the 2nd Asian Indoor Games in Macau with 11 match points. India won the silver with 9 match points followed by Vietnam with 8 match points and 16.5 game points for the bronze.

== World Youth Olympiads (U16) ==
=== 2002 ===
The Malaysian Chess Federation (MCF) organised the World Youth Olympiad (U16) which took place in Kuala Lumpur, Malaysia 20–28 August 2002. 2nd seeds China A took clear first on the back of an 85% score on board 1 by Wang Yue and an 80% score on board 2 by Zhao Jun. (Games in PGN.)

Final Standings

- 1 2 China - A 2362 31 232.0
- 2 1 Ukraine 2412 27 234.0
- 3 7 Indonesia 2197 26.5 219.0
- 4 4 India 2292 26 238.0
- 5 11 Uzbekistan 2113 24 238.5
- 6 3 Romania 2300 23 233.0
- 7 6 Iran 2224 22.5 226.5
- 8 8 Kazakhstan 2176 22 228.5
- 9 17 Singapore - A 2022 21.5 213.0
- 10 10 Vietnam 2119 21 216.5
- 11 9 Malaysia - A 2162 21 211.0
- 12 14 Australia - A 2067 21 190.0
- 13 5 England 2225 20.5 233.0
- 14 15 Turkmenistan 2067 20.5 179.0
- 15 28 USA 2000 20 198.0
- 28 Teams

== National team summit matches ==
=== 2001 ===
2001 Summit Matches

China vs. Russia Rapidplay

There was a China vs. Russia Rapidplay match in Beijing China on 5 September 2001 as a warm up for the China-Russia Summit. The match finished 4-4 after China won the first round 3.5-0.5 but Russia stormed back to win the second by the same score. The Russian team of Alexander Khalifman, Peter Svidler, Evgeny Shaposhnikov and Ekaterina Kovalevskaya took on the Chinese team of Ye Jiangchuan, Zhang Zhong, Ni Hua and Xu Yuhua. Games in PGN

China-Russia Chess Summit

The China-Russia Chess Summit took place in Shanghai, China, September 7-12th 2001. The event borrowed ideas from the China-USA match, like that series this one will last four years, China will host the match in 2001 and 2003 while Russia will be the host in 2002 and 2004. They played for the Riverside Weicheng Estate Cup. Games in PGN

- Venue: Shanghai International Cenvention Center
- Sponsor: Weicheng Real Estate Corporation
- Prizefund: Men's $30,000, Women's $10,000 and Juniors $6,000.
- Format: Single Schveningen for Men, Double Schveningen for both Women and Junior sections.
- Time control: 40 moves within 2 hours, then 1 hour for the remaining moves.

Day 6 12 September 2001

The final day 6 saw 4 of 12 games drawn. The Russian men won 3.5-2.5, the Chinese women won 2.5-0.5 and the Chinese juniors 2-1.

- Final Standings: Men Russia 21½ - China 14½, Women Russia 9-9 China, Juniors Russia 11 - China 7.
- Final Individual Standings: Men: 1. Motylev, 4.5 2-3. Grischuk, Khalifman 4.04. Dreev 3.5 5-7. Svidler, Xu Jun, Ye Jiangchuan 8-10. Rublevsky, Peng Xiaomin, Zhang Zhong 2.5 11. Liang Chong 2.0 12. Zhang Pengxiang 1.5.
- Women: 1-2. Wang Lei, Kovalevskaya 4.0 3. Stepovaia 3.5 4. Wang Pin 3.0 5. Xu Yuhua 2.0 6. Zimina 1.5
- Juniors: 1. Bu Xiangzhi 4.5 2-3. Kosteniuk, Sharposhnikov 4.0 4. Smirnov 3.0 5. Ni Hua 2.0 6. Xu Yuanyuan 0.5

2nd SUFE Cup

There was a double-round Sheveningen system match which took place in Shanghai University of Finance and Economics called the "China-World All Stars Women's Summit". It featured the best Chinese women players against the rest of World, mainly Georgia. The time control was 25min/10sec. 2 or 3 games were played each day except June 3 which was a rest day. The 1st SUFE Cup featured GMs such as Krasenkow, Bologan and Ye Jiangchuan. This years was the turn of the women. The event received a lot of publicity. All games were transmitted live by Shanghai Cable TV but not on the Internet. Games in PGN

The final score was 41.5- 30.5.

China 41.5

1 Wang Pin wg CHN 2504 8.0 2564; 2 Zhu Chen wg CHN 2538 7.5 2534; 3 Xie Jun g CHN 2557 7.0 2496; 4 Xu Yuhua wg CHN 2501 7.0 2496; 5 Wang Lei wg CHN 2498 6.5 2468; 6 Qin Kanying wg CHN 2489 5.5 2410;

Rest of the World 30.5

1 Chiburdanidze, Maia g GEO 2513 7.0 2571; 2 Maric, Alisa m YUG 2446 6.0 2514; 3 Alexandria, Nana wg GEO 2336 5.5 2485; 4 Ioseliani, Nana m GEO 2499 5.0 2457; 5 Gaprindashvili, Nona g GEO 2381 4.0 2389; 6 Zhukova, Natalia wg UKR 2463 3.0 2321;

USA-China Match

The Seattle Chess Foundation ran the US-China Chess Summit Match March 14–18 in Seattle at the Norton Building's Harbor Club (Seattle) in downtown Seattle (second and Columbia). The four-round match had the top six players of each country facing each other in one game a day for four days. In addition, two leading women players and two junior players (under 18) from each country competed. China won the event 21-19 thanks to a brilliant day 3 (6.5-3.5), days 2 and 4 were drawn and the US edged day 1. Games in PGN

US team: Joel Benjamin, Boris Gulko, Yasser Seirawan, Gregory Kaidanov, Hikaru Nakamura, Alexander Ivanov, Larry Christiansen, Irina Krush, Camilla Baginskaite, Vinay S Bhat, Dmitry Schneider.

China team: Zhang Zhong, Yin Hao, Xu Jun, Peng Xiaomin, Ni Hua, Xie Jun, Zhu Chen, Wang Lei, Qin Kanying, Bu Xiangzhi.

US-China Results:

- Day One: The US 5.5 - China 4.5.
- Day Two.: US 5 - China 5.
- Day Three: US 3.5 - China 6.5.
- Day Four: US 5 - China 5.

Final score: China 21 - US 19.

=== 2002 ===
2002 Summit Matches

US-China Chess Summit

The US-China Chess Summit took place July 10-15th 2002 in Shanghai with games on the 11th, 12th, 14th, and 15th. Each round consisted of 10 games featuring six of the top male players, two of the top female players, and two of the top junior players from each country. The US led until the final round when a 6-4 loss led to China winning 20½ - 19½ overall. All Games in PGN

CHINA 4-6 USA DAY 1 11 July 2002

Ye Jiangchuan B 0-1 W Alexander Goldin
Xu Jun W 1/2 B Yasser Seirawan
Zhang Zhong B 1/2 W Larry Christiansen
Bu Xiangzhi W 1/2 B Gregory Kaidanov
Ni Hua B 0-1 W Joel Benjamin
Zhang Pengxiang W 0-1 B Alexander Shabalov
Zhu Chen B 1-0 W Irina Krush
Wang Pin W 1-0 B Jennifer Shahade
Wang Hao B 0-1 W Dmitry Schneider
Wang Yue W 1/2 B Vinay Bhat

CHINA 5.5-4.5 USA DAY 2 12 July 2002

Ye Jiangchuan 1/2 Alexander Goldin
Yasser Seirawan 1/2 Xu Jun
Zhang Zhong 1-0 Boris Gulko
Gregory Kaidanov 1/2 Bu Xiangzhi
Ni Hua 0-1 Joel Benjamin
Alexander Shabalov 1-0 Zhang Pengxiang
Zhu Chen 1-0 Irina Krush
Jennifer Shahade 0-1 WGM Wang Pin
Zhao Jun 1/2 FM Dmitry Schneider
Vinay Bhat 1/2 IM Wang Yue

Results of the 3rd Round 14 July 2002

CHINA 5 - 5 USA (14½ - 15½)

Ye Jiangchuan B 1/2 W Alexander Goldin
Xu Jun W 1-0 B Larry Christiansen
Zhang Zhong B 1/2 W Boris Gulko
Bu Xiangzhi W 1/2 B Gregory Kaidanov
Ni Hua B 1/2 W Joel Benjamin
Xie Jun W 1/2 B Alexander Shabalov
Zhu Chen B 0-1 W Irina Krush
Wang Pin W 1/2 B Elena Donaldson
Zhao Jun B 0-1 W Nakamura Hikaru
Wang Yue W 1-0 B Vinay Bhat

Round 4 15 July 2002

CHINA 6-4 USA 20½ - 19½

Ye Jiangchuan W 1/2 B Alexander Goldin
Xu Jun B 0-1 W Larry Christiansen
Zhang Zhong W 1/2 B Boris Gulko
Bu Xiangzhi B 1/2 W Gregory Kaidanov
Ni Hua W 1/2 B Joel Benjamin
Xie Jun B 1-0 W Alexander Shabalov
Zhu Chen W 1-0 B Irina Krush
Wang Pin B 1-0 W Elena Donaldson
Zhao Jun W 1/2 B Dmitry Schneider
Wang Yue B 1/2 W Nakamura Hikaru

=== 2006 ===
2006 Summit Matches

France - China Match

France and China played for the Trophée MULTICOMS in Paris 4–9 September 2006. This is a Scheveningen match with 6 men and 3 women in the teams. There are 20 000 Euros in prizes for the men's section. France edged out China 20-16 in the main men's event. The women's part was a complete mismatch in terms of ELO ratings in favour of the Chinese and so it proved in reality finishing 12.5-5.5. This left the final overall result as China 28.5 France 25.5.

Games in PGN (Men) - Games in PGN (Women)

Final Round 6 Standings:

Men

France Men 20.0

1. Bauer, Christian g FRA 2599 4.0 2705
2. Nataf, Igor-Alexandre g FRA 2592 4.0 2705
3. Fressinet, Laurent g FRA 2626 4.0 2705
4. Sokolov, Andrei1 g FRA 2589 3.5 2637
5. Degraeve, Jean-Marc g FRA 2540 2.5 2523
6. Vachier-Lagrave, Maxime g FRA 2577 2.0 2455

China Men 16.0

1. Wang Yue g CHN 2626 4.0 2712
2. Zhou Jianchao g CHN 2520 3.5 2644
3. Ye Jiangchuan g CHN 2641 2.5 2530
4. Yu Shaoteng g CHN 2542 2.5 2530
5. Zhang Pengxiang g CHN 2622 2.0 2462
6. Zhao Jun g CHN 2533 1.5 2394

Women France Women 5.5

1. Leconte, Maria wg FRA 2304 3.5 2524
2. Choisy, Mathilde wf FRA 2145 1.0 2194
3. Guichard, Pauline FRA 2227 1.0 2194

China Women 12.5

1. Hou Yifan wf CHN 2488 5.0 2498
2. Zhao Xue wg CHN 2456 4.0 2350
3. Shen Yang CHN 2459 3.5 2282

Total: China 28.5 France 25.5

Coverage at: http://www.echecs.asso.fr/ and http://www.europe-echecs.com/

China-Russia Chess Summit

The China - Russia Chess Summit saw two double round robin Scheveningen format events, one for men and one for women, taking place in Ergun, Mongolia 10–20 August 2006. Russia won the men's event 26.5-23.5 but China won the women's section winning 28-22 which meant that in the combined standings China beat Russia 51.5-48.5.

Men's Games in PGN - Women's Games in PGN

=== 2007 ===
2007 Summit Matches

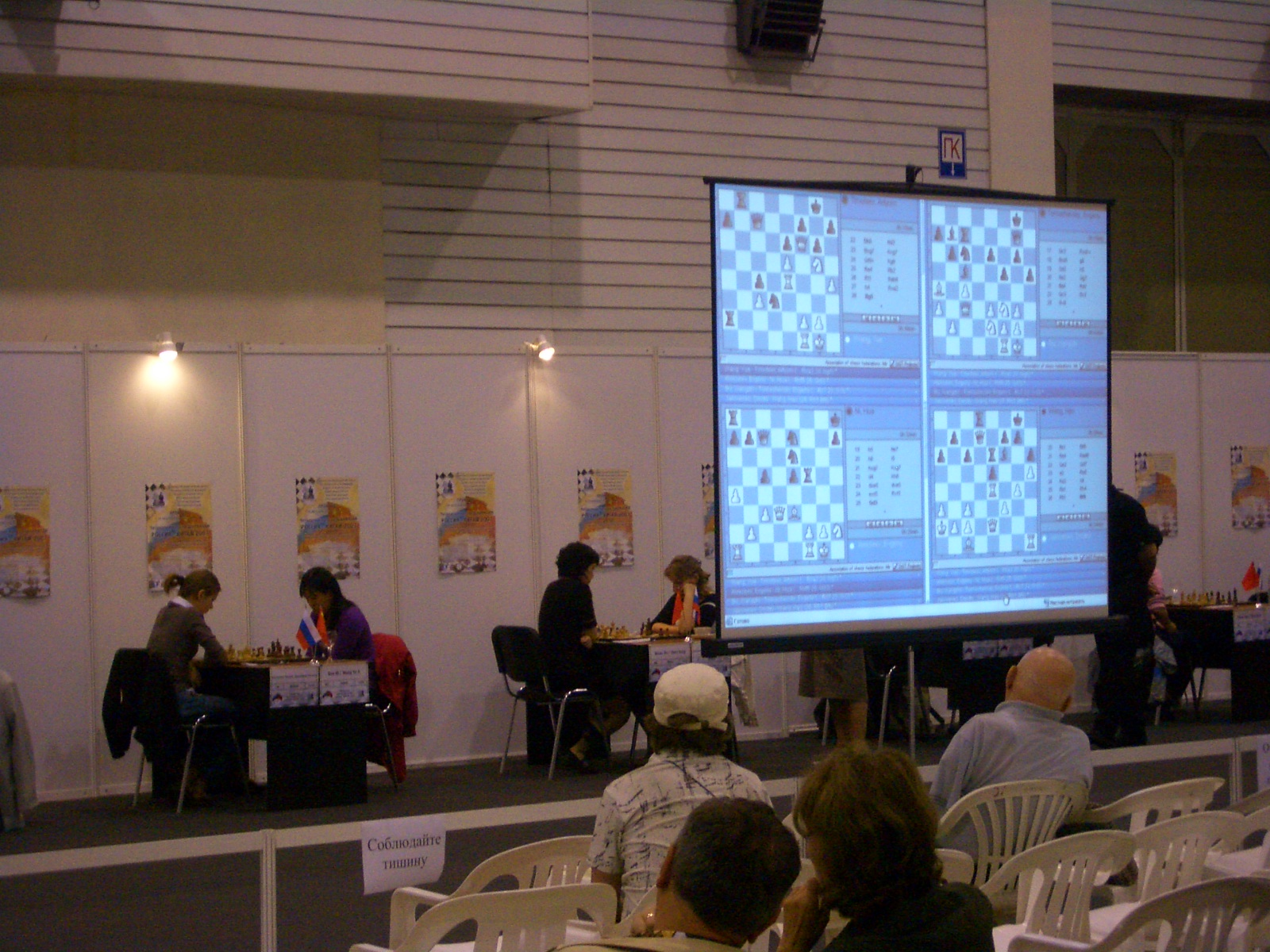
4th Russian-Chinese Chess Match at Nizhny Novgorod Fair, 2007 click to enlarge.

Russia vs China Match

The 4th China vs Russia Chess Match took place 18–31 August 2007 in Nizhniy Novgorod, Russia. China won the match overall 52.5-47.5 coming back to win the men's half with three wins in the final round and won the women's half 27-23 (almost entirely due to Elena Tairova's catastrophic 2.5/10, the other Russian players scored at least 50%).

Games in PGN

Final Round 10 Standings: IV RUS-CHN Match Nizhniy Novgorod RUS (RUS), 20-30 viii 2007

1 Alekseev, Evgeny         g RUS 2689  7.0  2816
2 Inarkiev, Ernesto        g RUS 2663  5.5  2703
3 Jakovenko, Dmitry        g RUS 2735  5.0  2667
4 Tomashevsky, Evgeny      g RUS 2654  3.5  2557
5 Timofeev, Artyom         g RUS 2650  3.5  2557
                                      24.5

1 Kovalevskaya, Ekaterina  m RUS 2454  5.5  2469
2 Korbut, Ekaterina       wg RUS 2445  5.0  2433
3 Kosintseva, Nadezhda     m RUS 2475  5.0  2433
4 Kosintseva, Tatiana      m RUS 2502  5.0  2433
5 Tairova, Elena          wg RUS 2410  2.5  2240
                                      23.0
                                      47.5
1 Bu Xiangzhi              g CHN 2685  5.0  2678
2 Wang Hao                 g CHN 2624  5.5  2714
3 Wang Yue                 g CHN 2696  5.5  2714
4 Zhang Pengxiang          g CHN 2649  5.0  2678
5 Ni Hua                   g CHN 2681  4.5  2642
                                      25.5
                                      
1 Ruan Lufei                 CHN 2433  6.0  2529
2 Zhao Xue                wg CHN 2500  5.5  2493
3 Shen Yang               wg CHN 2439  5.5  2493
4 Huang Qian              wm CHN 2410  5.0  2457
5 Wang Yu                 wg CHN 2384  5.0  2457
                                      27.0
                                      52.5

Official site: https://web.archive.org/web/20080224034319/http://russiachess.org/

UK-China Match

The Liverpool Chess International took place 3–9 September 2007. China had a comfortable 28 - 20 win against a UK team, led by Michael Adams and Nigel Short, by 28-22 in Liverpool. The Chinese team managed to do this without having a single player among the world's 20 highest-rated grandmasters. The average age of the British team was 29. For the Chinese it was 20.

Games in PGN

- UK - China Match Liverpool. Reports on Round 5-6
- UK - China Match Liverpool. Reports on Round 4
- UK - China Match Liverpool. Reports on Round 3
- UK - China Match Liverpool. Reports on Round 2
- UK - China Match Liverpool. Reports on Round 1

Round 6 (September 9, 2007)

Ding Yixin - Arakhamia-Grant, Ketevan 1-0 52 B59 Sicilian Boleslavsky
Shen Yang - Houska, Jovanka 1/2 31 B12 Caro Kann Advanced
Wang Yue - Howell, David W L 1-0 57 A16 English Opening
Zhang Pengxiang - Jones, Gawain C B 1/2 50 A45 Trompowsky
Pert, Nicholas - Wang Hao 1/2 30 D45 Anti-Meran Variations
Bu Xiangzhi - Rowson, Jonathan 1/2 22 D36 QGD Exchange
Short, Nigel D - Ni Hua 1/2 44 B13 Caro Kann Exchange
Adams, Michael - Hou Yifan 1-0 39 B84 Sicilian Scheveningen

Final Round 6 Standings: UK-CHN Match Liverpool ENG (ENG), 4-9 ix 2007

Chinese Men

1 Wang Hao                  g CHN 2624   4.0  2722
2 Zhang Pengxiang           g CHN 2649   4.0  2722
3 Wang Yue                  g CHN 2696   4.0  2722
4 Ni Hua                    g CHN 2681   4.0  2722
5 Bu Xiangzhi               g CHN 2685   3.5  2654
6 Hou Yifan                wg CHN 2523   2.5  2540
                                        22.0

Chinese Women

1 Ding Yixin               wf CHN 2278   3.5  2466
2 Shen Yang                wg CHN 2439   2.5  2352
                                         6.0
                                        28.0

UK Men

1 Adams, Michael            g ENG 2724   3.5  2700
2 Short, Nigel D            g ENG 2683   3.0  2643
3 Jones, Gawain C B         m ENG 2526   2.5  2586
4 Howell, David W L         g ENG 2519   2.0  2518
5 Pert, Nicholas            g ENG 2536   1.5  2450
6 Rowson, Jonathan          g SCO 2599   1.5  2450
                                        14.0

UK Women

1 Arakhamia-Grant, Ketevan  m GEO 2418   4.0  2483
2 Houska, Jovanka           m ENG 2401   2.0  2233
                                         6.0
                                        20.0

== FIDE World Cup ==
=== 2000 ===
1st FIDE World Cup in Shenyang, China 2000

The 1st FIDE World Cup took place in Shenyang, China 1–13 September 2000. Viswanathan Anand and Xu Yuhua were the winners .

Live internet coverage at: http://www.worldchesscup.com/ or https://web.archive.org/web/20011203215506/http://www.sy.ln.cn/chess/applete/wcc.htm

Additional FIDE coverage at: http://www.fide.org/fide/html/review/Shenyang/index.html

- PGN Knockout Games (Finals complete)
- PGN Knockout Games (Semi-Finals Complete)
- PGN Knockout Games (Round 1 complete)
- PGN Preliminary Gamescores complete.
- Individual Results and Standings for the Preliminary Groups

The event was in the following format: The 24 entrants were initially split into four groups of six players for the all-play-all preliminary sections which took place September 1-5th 2000. The top two players in each group went forward to the knockout stages (ties were resolved via playoffs on September 5). Knockout stages: Quarter Finals 7–8 September, Semi-Finals 9–10 September, Finals 12–13 September. Each knockout match was over two games with ties being resolved by playoff games at faster timerates. Link to the regulations on FIDE's site

Men's and Women's Finals

Day 1 (September 12, 2000)

Bareev, Evgeny - Anand, Viswanathan 1/2 0-1

Zhukova, Natalia - Xu Yuhua 1/2 0-1

Semi-Final Results Men:

Day 2 (September 10, 2000)

Anand, Viswanathan - Gelfand, Boris 1/2 1/2 Anand won the Playoff 2.5-1.5

Milos, Gilberto - Bareev, Evgeny 1/2 1/2 Bareev won the Playoff 1.5-0.5

Semi-Final Results Women:

Zhukova, Natalia - Hoang Thanh Trang 1/2 1-0

Cramling, Pia - Xu Yuhua 1-0 0-1 Xu Yuhua won the Playoff 2-1

Quarter Final Results Men:

Day 2 (September 7, 2000)

Top Half

Milos, Gilberto - Movsesian, Sergei 1/2 1/2 Milos won the Playoff 2-1

Bareev, Evgeny - Azmaiparashvili, Zurab 0-1 1-0 Bareev won the Playoff 1.5-0.5

Bottom Half

Gelfand, Boris - Ye Jiangchuan 1-0 0-1 Gelfand won the Playoff 1.5-0.5

Ivanchuk, Vassily - Anand, Viswanathan 0-1 1/2

Quarter Final Results Women:

Day 2 (September 7, 2000)

Top Half

Cramling, Pia - Zhu Chen 1-0 1/2

Wang Yu - Xu Yuhua 1/2 0-1

Bottom Half

Wang Pin - Zhukova, Natalia 0-1 1/2

Hoang Thanh Trang - Qin Kanying 1/2 1-0

Preliminary Groups Final Standings

See TWIC306 of September 18 2000

=== 2007 ===
Chess World Cup 2007
Main article: Chess World Cup 2007

The Chess World Cup 2007 ($1.92 million prize fund) took from November 23 to December 16, 2007 in Khanty Mansiysk, Russia. The FIDE World Cup was played on the elimination knockout system, with a total of 128 players competing. If Vladimir Kramnik had won the 2007 World Chess Championship in Mexico City he would have been expected to face Veselin Topalov in a World Championship match format. As Kramnik did not win, he will, instead, have the right to play a match against FIDE's Mexico 2007 world champion Viswanathan Anand, and the 2007 FIDE World Cup's winner (Gata Kamsky) will play a match against Veselin Topalov. The winners of the two matches will face each other in a match to determine the ultimate undisputed world chess champion.

Qualification

Qualification for the FIDE World Cup 2007 for Chinese players occurred in two stages.

First stage

The first stage was the Chinese Zonal (Zone 3.5) Championship 2007 held in Shandong, 28 April - 6 May 2007. (Event.) China is a member of the Asian Chess Federation (ACF) and competes in Zone 3.5 by itself because it is a relatively strong chess nation in Asia.

The top two places in the Chinese Zonal qualified. (Results.) They were Wang Yue (first) and Bu Xiangzhi (second).

Xu Yuhua also managed to qualify for the men's World Cup as she had been the reigning women's world champion.

Second stage

The second stage was the Asian Individual Championship held in Manila, Philippines, 1–30 September 2007. (Event.)

Those who did not qualify (as the top 2) in the Chinese Zonal entered the second stage, the Asian Individual Championship. By competing at the Asian Continental Championship tournament more Chinese players could qualify for the World Cup. A total of 72 Asian players competed, and the top 10 places qualified for the World Cup.

Thirteen Chinese players competed in this event (seeded in brackets).

Five qualified by finishing in the top 10 (Results):

- Zhang Pengxiang (2) - qualified in first place
- Wang Hao (3) - qualified in second place
- Zhou Jianchao (8) - qualified in eighth place
- Zhao Jun (11) - qualified in fourth place
- Wen Yang (38) - qualified in sixth place

And the eight who did not manage to qualify:

- Ni Hua (1) - finished 16th
- Xu Jun (7) - finished 29th
- Li Shilong (13) - finished 18th
- Li Chao (21) - finished 15th
- Yu Shaoteng (23) - finished 17th
- Wang Rui (33) - finished 31st
- Zhou Weiqi (40) - finished 35th
- Shen Yang (45) - finished 52nd

Qualifiers

Therefore, eight Chinese players in total qualified for the World Cup. They are, in order of rating (as of October 2007):

- Wang Yue (2703)
- Bu Xiangzhi (2692)
- Zhang Pengxiang (2644)
- Wang Hao (2643)
- Zhou Jianchao (2566)
- Zhao Jun (2552)
- Xu Yuhua (2517)
- Wen Yang (2515)

Competition

Round One

Game 1 results:

- Wang, Yue (15) CHN 2703 - Pridorozhni, Aleksei (114) RUS 2506 — draw
- Bu, Xiangzhi (18) CHN 2692 - Kabanov, Nikolai (111) RUS 2512 — win
- Zhang, Pengxiang (48) CHN 2644 - Gagunashvili, Merab (81) GEO 2584 — draw
- Wang, Hao (51) CHN 2643 - Markus, Robert (78) SRB 2586 — draw
- Sutovsky, Emil (39) ISR 2655 - Zhou, Jianchao (90) CHN 2566 — draw
- Harikrishna, P. (32) IND 2668 - Zhao, Jun (97) CHN 2552 — draw
- Malakhov, Vladimir (21) RUS 2690 - Xu, Yuhua (108) CHN 2517 — loss
- Almasi, Zoltan (20) HUN 2691 - Wen Yang (109) CHN 2515 — loss

Game 2 results:

- Wang, Yue (15) CHN 2703 - Pridorozhni, Aleksei (114) RUS 2506 — win
- Bu, Xiangzhi (18) CHN 2692 - Kabanov, Nikolai (111) RUS 2512 — win
- Zhang, Pengxiang (48) CHN 2644 - Gagunashvili, Merab (81) GEO 2584 — draw
- Wang, Hao (51) CHN 2643 - Markus, Robert (78) SRB 2586 — win
- Sutovsky, Emil (39) ISR 2655 - Zhou, Jianchao (90) CHN 2566 — win
- Harikrishna, P. (32) IND 2668 - Zhao, Jun (97) CHN 2552 — draw
- Malakhov, Vladimir (21) RUS 2690 - Xu, Yuhua (108) CHN 2517 — loss
- Almasi, Zoltan (20) HUN 2691 - Wen Yang (109) CHN 2515 — draw

End of Round One results

- Wang, Yue: proceeds to Round Two
- Bu, Xiangzhi: proceeds to Round Two
- Zhang, Pengxiang: won tie break, proceeds to Round Two
- Wang, Hao: proceeds to Round Two
- Zhou, Jianchao: proceeds to Round Two
- Zhao, Jun: won tie break, proceeds to Round Two
- Xu, Yuhua: knocked out in Round One
- Wen Yang: knocked out in Round One

Round Two

Game 1 results:

- Wang Yue 2703 - Sergei Tiviakov (NED) 2643 — draw
- Bu Xiangzhi 2692 - Alexander Motylev (RUS) 2645 — draw
- Zhang Pengxiang 2644 - Sergey Karjakin (UKR) 2694 — draw
- Wang Hao 2643 - Ruslan Ponomariov (UKR) 2705 — win
- Zhou Jianchao 2566 - Andrei Volokitin (UKR) 2678 — draw
- Zhao Jun 2552 - Liviu-Dieter Nisipeanu (ROU) 2668 — draw

Game 2 results:

- Wang Yue 2703 - Sergei Tiviakov (NED) 2643 — draw
- Bu Xiangzhi 2692 - Alexander Motylev (RUS) 2645 — draw
- Zhang Pengxiang 2644 - Sergey Karjakin (UKR) 2694 — loss
- Wang Hao 2643 - Ruslan Ponomariov (UKR) 2705 — loss
- Zhou Jianchao 2566 - Andrei Volokitin (UKR) 2678 — draw
- Zhao Jun 2552 - Liviu-Dieter Nisipeanu (ROU) 2668 — draw

End of Round Two Results

- Wang, Yue: won tie break, proceeds to Round Three
- Bu, Xiangzhi: won tie break, proceeds to Round Three
- Zhou, Jianchao: won tie break, proceeds to Round Three
- Zhang, Pengxiang: knocked out in Round Two
- Wang, Hao: knocked out in tie break
- Zhao, Jun: knocked out in tie break

Round Three

Game 1 results:

- Wang Yue 2703 - Bu Xiangzhi 2692 — 1-0
- Zhou Jianchao 2566 - Michael Adams (ENG) 2729 — loss

Game 2 results:

- Wang Yue 2703 - Bu Xiangzhi 2692 — draw
- Zhou Jianchao 2566 - Michael Adams (ENG) 2729 — draw

End of Round Three Results

- Wang, Yue: proceeds to Round Four
- Bu, Xiangzhi: knocked out in Round Three
- Zhou, Jianchao: knocked out in Round Three

Round Four

Game 1 results:

- Wang Yue 2703 - Ivan Cheparinov (BUL) 2670 — Draw

Game 2 results:

- Wang Yue 2703 - Ivan Cheparinov (BUL) 2670 — Loss

End of Round Four Results

- Wang, Yue: knocked out in Round Four

== Other ==
=== 2000 ===
2000 Miscellaneous Events

6th Tan Chin Nam Cup

The 6th Tan Chin Nam Cup & 2nd Hua Yuan Hotel Cup GM Chess Tournament took place in Beijing, China July 9 - 18th 2000. The Category XVI event (2644) had 10 players. There was a four-way tie for first between Viktor Bologan, Nigel Short, Alexei Dreev, Alexander Onischuk with Bologan winning on tie-break. Bologan was the last player to finish attempting to win his final round game against Wang Zili.

Games in PGN

Round 9 Standings: 1. Bologan, Viktor g MDA 2641 5.5; 2. Dreev, Alexey g RUS 2676 5.5; 3. Short, Nigel D g ENG 2677 5.5; 4. Onischuk, Alexander g UKR 2627 5.5; 5. Ye Jiangchuan g CHN 2670 5.0; 6. Peng Xiaomin g CHN 2657 4.5; 7. Zhang Zhong g CHN 2636 4.5; 8. Xu Jun g CHN 2668 3.5; 9. Wang Zili g CHN 2603 3.0; 10. Adianto, Utut g INA 2583 2.5;

Pictures of the event at: http://www.sinosports.net

=== 2001 ===
2001 Miscellaneous Events

7th Tan Chin Nam Cup

The 7th Tan Chin Nam Cup took place in Shanghai 9–18 July 2001. Michał Krasenkow, Viktor Bologan and Ye Jiangchuan finished on 5.5/9.

7th Tan Chin Nam Cup Shanghai CHN (CHN), 9-18 vii 2001cat. XVI (2635)

                                     1 2 3 4 5 6 7 8 9 0

1. Krasenkow, Michal     g POL 2573  * = = = 1 1 1 = = 0  5.5  2722 
2. Bologan, Viktor       g MDA 2655  = * 1 0 0 = 1 1 1 =  5.5  2713 
3. Ye Jiangchuan         g CHN 2671  = 0 * = = = 1 = 1 1  5.5  2711 
4. Sokolov, Ivan         g BIH 2659  = 1 = * = = 0 = 0 1  4.5  2632 
5. Zhang Zhong           g CHN 2632  0 1 = = * = 0 = = 1  4.5  2635 
6. Xu Jun                g CHN 2655  0 = = = = * = = 1 =  4.5  2633 
7. Dreev, Alexey         g RUS 2690  0 0 0 1 1 = * = 1 =  4.5  2629 
8. Peng Xiaomin          g CHN 2648  = 0 = = = = = * = =  4.0  2590 
9. Tkachiev, Vladislav   g FRA 2642  = 0 0 1 = 0 0 = * 1  3.5  2554 
10. Ni Hua               f CHN 2528  1 = 0 0 0 = = = 0 *  3.0  2522

Pictures of the event at: http://www.sinosports.net

Zhong Hong Real Estate Cup

The Zhong Hong Real Estate Cup took place Beijing, China 20–30 July 2001. IM Zhang Pengxiang took first place and his final GM norm.

In addition the Tian Lian Ann Cup (A) and (B) event took place 12–28 July 2001 in Tianjin China. The Category 5, round robin had 12 players. The winners were IM Yu Shaoteng (A) 8.5/11 and IM Wang Rui (B) 7.5/11.

Zhong Hong Real Estate Cup Beijing CHN (CHN), 20-30 vii 2001cat. X (2476)

                                    1 2 3 4 5 6 7 8 9 0 1 2

1. Zhang Pengxiang     m CHN 2487  * = = 0 = 1 = 1 1 1 1 1  8.0  2650 
2. Li Shilong          m CHN 2486  = * 1 = = = = 1 1 = = 1  7.5  2608 
3. Wu Shaobin          g SIN 2535  = 0 * = = = 1 1 = = 1 1  7.0  2572 
4. Liang Jinrong       g CHN 2510  1 = = * = = = = = = = =  6.0  2509 
5. Wang Zili           g CHN 2557  = = = = * = = = = = = 1  6.0  2504 
6. Wu Wenjin           g CHN 2560  0 = = = = * = = = = 1 1  6.0  2504 
7. Ni Hua              f CHN 2568  = = 0 = = = * = 0 1 1 1  6.0  2503 
8. Wang Pin           wg CHN 2504  0 0 0 = = = = * 1 1 1 1  6.0  2509 
9. Liang Chong         m CHN 2556  0 0 = = = = 1 0 * = 1 1  5.5  2468 
10. Datu, Idelfonso    f PHI 2445  0 = = = = = 0 0 = * = =  4.0  2377 
11. Mas, Hafizulhelmi  m MAS 2456  0 = 0 = = 0 0 0 0 = * =  2.5  2267 
12. Xu Yaping            SIN 2050  0 0 0 = 0 0 0 0 0 = = *  1.5  2205 

=== 2003 ===
2003 Miscellaneous Events

Beijing Chess Challenge

The Beijing Chess Challenge Match took place September 22-23rd 2003, in China Resources Hotel, Beijing between Chinese teams and an International team. On day 1 the international team won 5-4 against a Chinese A team, on day 2 the international team was held 4.5-4.5 by the Chinese B team.

Games in PGN Complete

International Team players: Evgeny Bareev g RUS 2721 Nigel Short g ENG 2701 Yasser Seirawan g USA 2626

Chinese Team A players: Ye Jiangchuan g 2683 Zhang Zhong g 2658 Xu Jun g 2626

Chinese Team B players: Bu Xiangzhi g 2588 Zhang Pengxiang g 2567 Ni Hua f 2533

There are three games a day, each Chinese player take a player of International Team, the game start from 14:00 to 18:00 Beijing time, the time controls are 25 minutes, each move with a 10 seconds increment, 30 minutes rest after each game.

22 September International team - Chinese Team A 14:00 - 18:00 Beijing time

Xu Jun - Nigel Short 0.5, Zhang Zhong - Engeny Bareev 0-1, Yasser Seirawan - Ye Jiangchuan 1-0 Chinese Team A - International Team 0.5-2.5 Round 2 Nigel Short - Zhang Zhong 1-0, Engeny Bareev - Ye Jiangchuan 0.5, Xu Jun - Yasser Seirawan 0.5 Chinese Team A - International Team 1-2 Round 3 Ye Jiangchuan - Nigel Short 0.5, Engeny Bareev - Xu Jun 0-1, Yasser Seirawan - Zhang Zhong 0-1 Chinese Team A - International Team 2.5-0.5 Final standings come soon¡¡ Chinese Team A - International Team 4-5

23 September International Team - Chinese Team B 14:00 - 18:00 Beijing time

Round 1 Nigel Short - Ni Hua 0-1, Evgeny Bareev - Bu Xiangzhi 0.5, Zhang Pengxiang - Yasser Seirawan 1-0. Chinese Team B - International Team 2.5-0.5 Round 2 Ni Hua - Evgeny 0.5, Bu Xiangzhi - Yasser Seirawan 0.5, Nigel Short - Zhangpeng 1-0 Chinese Team B - International Team 1-2 Round 3 Yasser Seirawan - Ni hua 1-0, Bu Xiangzhi - Nigel Short 1-0, Zhang Pengxiang - Evgeny Bareev 0-1, Chinese Team B - International Team 1-2. Day 2 total Chinese Team B - International Team 4.5 - 4.5

Kings and Queens match in Yongchuan, Chongqing

All Games in PGN

A double round robin match took place September 13 to 15th 2003 in China. The 4 "Kings" were GM Evgeny Bareev RUS 2721, GM Nigel Short ENG 2701, GM Ye Jiangchuan CHN 2683 and GM Yasser Seirawan USA 2626. The 4 "Queens" GM Xie Jun CHN 2569, GM Zhu Chen CHN 2495, WGM Xu Yuhua CHN 2485, WGM Zhao Xue CHN 2467.

Alternating moves in the games the players drew a number to choose their partners. There were 3 games a day, time controls were 25 minutes, each move with a 10 seconds increment.

Round 1 (September 13, 2003)

Zhao Xue/Nigel Short - Zhu Chen/Yasser Seirawan 1-0 39 A62 Benoni Xu Yuhua/Ye Jiangchuan - Xie Jun/Evgeny Bareev 1-0 51 B19 Caro Kann

Round 2 (September 13, 2003)

Zhao Xue/Nigel Short - Xu Yuhua/Ye Jiangchuan 1/2 39 E05 Catalan Zhu Chen/Yasser Seirawan - Xie Jun/Evgeny Bareev 1-0 43 E70 King's Indian Fianchetto

Round 3 (September 13, 2003)

Xie Jun/Evgeny Bareev - Zhao Xue/Nigel Short 0-1 73 A07 Barcza System Xu Yuhua/Ye Jiangchuan - Zhu Chen/Yasser Seirawan 1/2 50 B40 Sicilian Classical

Round 4 (September 15, 2003)

Zhu Chen/Yasser Seirawan - Zhao Xue/Nigel Short 1/2 25 E34 Nimzo Indian 4.Qc2 Xie Jun/Evgeny Bareev - Xu Yuhua/Ye Jiangchuan 1-0 35 A08 Barcza System

Round 5 (September 15, 2003)

Xie Jun/Evgeny Bareev - Zhu Chen/Yasser Seirawan 1/2 41 B24 Sicilian Closed Xu Yuhua/Ye Jiangchuan - Zhao Xue/Nigel Short 0-1 59 B85 Sicilian Scheveningen

Round 6 (September 15, 2003)

Zhao Xue/Nigel Short - Xie Jun/Evgeny Bareev 0-1 34 A04 Dutch System Zhu Chen/Yasser Seirawan - Xu Yuhua/Ye Jiangchuan 1/2 49 E32 Nimzo Indian 4.Qc2

Final Standings:

1. Zhao Xue/Nigel Short 4.0
2. Zhu Chen/Yasser Seirawan 3.0
3. Xie Jun/Evgeny Bareev 2.5
4. Xu Yuhua/Ye Jiangchuan 2.5

3 Arrows Cup

The 3 Arrows (San Jian) Cup took place in Jinan 17–20 September 2003. A team of Chinese women (Queens) took on a men's team (Kings). Final Score Kings 12.5 - Queens 3.5.

Games in PGN

Internet coverage: https://web.archive.org/web/20080224020443/http://www.64.net.cn/

=== 2004 ===
2004 Miscellaneous Events

Tigran Petrosian Memorial Internet Tournament

The Tigran Petrosian Memorial Internet Tournament took place December 18-23rd 2004 with games starting at 12:00 noon in Paris, 14:00 in St. Petersburg. 15:00 in Yerevan and 19:00 in Beijing. Each country faced each of the other three countries two times for a total of six rounds. Fischer time control will be used (1 hour 30 minutes plus 15 minutes added at move 40; 30 second increments are added after every move). The event took place on ICC.

China won the Tigran Petrosian Memorial Internet Tournament. Their final round match against Russia came down to the wire. The Russians led 2-1 but Wang Yue beat Vadim Zvjaginsev to tie the match and win the event for the Chinese. Final Scores: China 14.0 - France 13.0 - Russia 13.0 - Armenia 8.0

Games in PGN

Round 1 18 December 2004 Armenia-Russia 2-2; China-France 2-2

Round 2 19 December 2004 France-Armenia 3-1; China-Russia 2-2

Round 3 20 December 2004 Russia-France 3-1; China-Armenia 3.5-0.5

Round 4 21 December 2004 Russia-Armenia 2.5-1.5; France-China 2.0-2.0.

Round 5 22 December 2004 France-Russia 2.5-1.5; China-Armenia 2.5-1.5.

Round 6 23 December 2004 Russia-China 2.0-2.0; France-Armenia 2.5-1.5.

Players: Armenia (average rating: 2626) GM Aronian 2675 GM Lputian 2634 GM Sargissian 2611 GM Art. Minasian 2581 Russia (average rating: 2688) GM Svidler 2735 GM Dreev 2698 GM Khalifman 2669 GM Zvjaginsev 2650 France (average rating:2627) GM Lautier 2682 GM Fressinet 2640 GM Bauer 2622 GM Nataf 2565 China (average rating: 2590) GM Bu Xiangzhi 2615 GM Ni Hua 2611 GM Zhang Zhong 2596 GM Wang Yue 2536

Tai Yuan GM

The Tai Yuan GM tournament took place in China 17–26 July 2004. Prizes $20,000. Time control 90 minutes for 40 moves, plus 15 minutes for the remaining moves with 30 seconds increment from move 1. Play started 2pm local time (GMT+8) except the last round which is at 10am. Nigel Short won the event by a clear point from Ni Hua. Games in PGN

Round 9 (July 26, 2004)

Ni Hua - Xu Jun 1/2 23 B92 Sicilian Najdorf with 6.Be2 Lautier, Joel - Bu Xiangzhi 1-0 40 A29 English Four Knights Xie Jun - Short, Nigel D 1/2 17 C08 French Tarrasch Ye Jiangchuan - Lputian, Smbat G 1/2 27 C09 French Tarrasch Zhang Zhong - Dreev, Alexey 1/2 64 A07 Barcza System

Final Round 9 Standings: 1. Short, Nigel D g ENG 2684 6.5; 2. Ni Hua g CHN 2583 5.5; 3. Lautier, Joel g FRA 2666 5.0; 4. Dreev, Alexey g RUS 2690 5.0; 5. Bu Xiangzhi g CHN 2620 4.5; 6. Xie Jun g CHN 2564 4.0; 7. Lputian, Smbat G g ARM 2634 4.0; 8. Ye Jiangchuan g CHN 2681 4.0; 9. Zhang Zhong g CHN 2603 3.5; 10. Xu Jun g CHN 2617 3.0;

Official site (Chinese): http://sports.sina.com.cn/z/chess_2004/index.shtml

=== 2005 ===
2005 Miscellaneous Events

2nd Sanjin Hotel Cup

The 2nd Sanjin Hotel Cup took place in Tiayuan, China 8–20 July 2005. Pentala Harikrishna wins with 8.5/11 a point clear of Motylev who was defeated in the final round. Games in PGN

Final Round 11 Standings: 1. Harikrishna, P g IND 2645 8.5; 2. Motylev, Alexander g RUS 2675 7.5; 3. Wang Yue g CHN 2576 6.5; 4. Bu Xiangzhi g CHN 2632 6.5; 5. Ni Hua g CHN 2629 6.0; 6. Karjakin, Sergey g UKR 2645 5.5; 7. Petrosian, Tigran L g ARM 2581 5.5; 8. Zhang Pengxiang g CHN 2616 5.0; 9. Zhang Zhong g CHN 2608 4.5; 10. Wang Hao CHN 2512 4.5; 11. Zhao Xue wg CHN 2470 3.0; 12. McShane, Luke J g ENG 2625 3.0;

Official site: http://sports.sina.com.cn.

China - France Youth Match

The China-France youth match took place in Shenzhen, China 28 June - 6 July 2005. China won 19-13. Games in PGN

Live coverage: http://sports.sina.com.cn/chess/live_gx/index.html

=== 2006 ===
2006 Miscellaneous Events

Taiyuan Scheveningen

The Taiyuan double round Scheveningen tournament took place July 10-22nd 2006, with one rest day on 16th. The total prize fund was US$18000 which was distributed according to the individual scores. Game started at 13:00 Beijing Time. The Chinese team won 36.5-35.5 against a foreign side.

Games in PGN

Official site: https://web.archive.org/web/20111028194605/http://ccl.sports.cn/ Live Broadcast: http://sports.sina.com.cn/chess/live_gx/index.html.

GM Scheveningen 2006

1 Ni Hua           2607     7.0/12
2 Bu Xiangzhi      2664     7.0/12
3 Zhang Pengxiang  2622     7.0/12
4 Wang Yue         2626     6.5/12
5 Wang Hao         2610     6.0/12
6 Zhang Zhong      2639     3.0/12
                           36.5
1 Jobava, Ba        2651     8.0/12
2 Timofeev, Arty    2657     7.0/12
3 Jakovenko, D      2667     6.0/12
4 Asrian, K         2635     6.0/12
5 Berkes, F         2601     4.5/12
6 Vescovi, G        2619     4.0/12
                           35.5

Team A Average Rating 2638

Jakovenko, Dmitry    g    RUS    2667    1983    M
Timofeev, Artyom     g    RUS    2657    1985    M
Jobava, Baadur       g    GEO    2651    1983    M
Asrian, Karen        g    ARM    2635    1980    M
Vescovi, Giovanni    g    BRA    2619    1978    M
Berkes, Ferenc       g    HUN    2601    1985    M

Team B Average Rating 2628

Bu, Xiangzhi         g    CHN    2664    1985    M
Zhang, Zhong         g    CHN    2639    1978    M
Wang, Yue            g    CHN    2626    1987    M
Zhang, Pengxiang     g    CHN    2622    1980    M
Wang, Hao            g    CHN    2610    1989    M
Ni, Hua              g    CHN    2607    1983    M

=== 2007 ===
2007 Miscellaneous Events

4th Taiyuan GM March

The Taiyuan Tournament Scheveningen tournament saw a foreign team beat a Chinese team 17-15. Vadim Zvjaginsev scored 5.5/8 to top score in the event, Wang Yue made 5/8 to top score for the Chinese team.

Games in PGN

4th GM March Taiyuan CHN (CHN), 4-14 vii 2007

Wang Yue        2696 5.0
Wang Hao        2624 4.0
Ni Hua          2681 3.0
Zhang Pengxiang 2649 3.0
                 
1 Zvjaginsev, V 2658 ½½ 1½ ½1 ½1 5.5
2 Cheparinov, I 2657 00 1½ ½1 ½½ 4.0
3 Asrian, K     2608 ½½ ½½ ½½ ½½ 4.0
4 Balogh, C     2567 ½½ 00 ½½ ½1 3.5

Official site: http://sports.sina.com.cn/chess/live_gx/index.html

== See also ==
- Chinese Chess Championship
- World Team Chess Championship

=== Sources ===
- OlimpBase, the encyclopedia of team chess
- The Week in Chess
- List of chess periodicals
