= Zhu Chen =

Qatari chess grandmaster (born 1976)

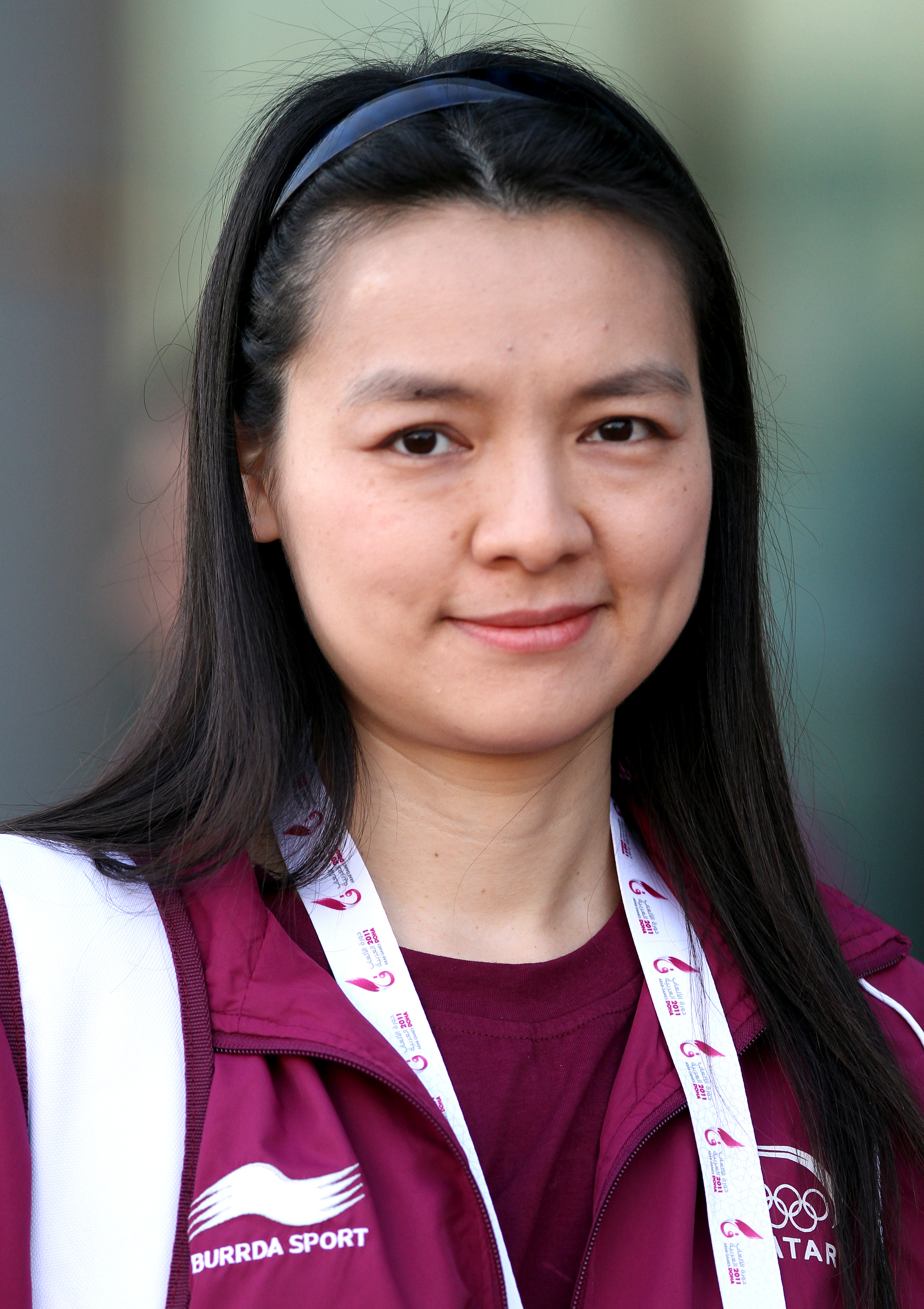
- Zhu Chen at the 2011 Pan Arab Games

Personal information
- Born: March 13, 1976 (age 50) Wenzhou, Zhejiang, China
- Spouse: Mohammed Al-Modiahki (m. 2001)

Chess career
- Country: China (until 2006); Qatar (since 2006)
- Title: Grandmaster (2001)
- Women's World Champion: 2001–04
- FIDE rating: 2423 (October 2026)
- Peak rating: 2548 (January 2008)
- Peak ranking: No. 4 woman (July 2000)

Zhu Chen
- Traditional Chinese: 諸宸
- Simplified Chinese: 诸宸
Transcriptions
Standard Mandarin
- Hanyu Pinyin: Zhū Chén
- Wade–Giles: Chu Ch'en
- Tongyong Pinyin: Jhū Chén
- Yale Romanization: Jū Chén
- IPA: [ʈʂú ʈʂʰə̌n]
Yue: Cantonese
- Yale Romanization: Jyú sàhn
- Jyutping: Zyu1 san4
- IPA: [jýː sɐ̏n]

Zhu Chen (simplified Chinese: 诸宸; traditional Chinese: 諸宸; pinyin: Zhū Chén, Arabic: زو تشن; born March 13, 1976) is a Chinese and Qatari chess grandmaster. In 1999, she became China's second women's world chess champion after Xie Jun, and China's 13th Grandmaster. In 2006, she obtained Qatari citizenship and since then has played for Qatar.

== Biography ==
In 1988 Zhu became the first Chinese player to win an international chess competition when she won the World Girls Under-12 Championship in Romania.

She won the World Junior Girls Chess Championship in 1994 and 1996. When she became Grandmaster in 1999, she was the seventh woman to do so.

At the age of 25 she defeated Alexandra Kosteniuk of Russia in a tournament for the 2001/2002 Women's World Chess Championship, by 5–3, becoming the ninth champion.

Zhu gave up the chance to defend her world title in Georgia in May 2004 due to a jammed schedule and her pregnancy.

In June 2004, Zhu played two games against the chess computer "Star of Unisplendour", which was an advanced AMD 64 bit 3400+ CPU and 2 GB RAM combined with the chess engine Fritz 8. She lost both games.

Zhu is married to Qatari Grandmaster Mohammed Al-Modiahki, and now represents Qatar. As of 2010, they have two daughters: Dana (b. 2004) and Hind (b. 2008). She also studied for a master's degree at Tsinghua University.

== Performance in competitions ==
- 1988.25 July-7 August, World Girls Under 12 Championship. 1st place - Romania
- 1990.5–19 September, Chinese National Women's Individual Championship "Group B".1st place - China
- 1991, Chinese National Women's Individual Championship. 2nd place - Chengdu, China
- 1992. September, Chinese National Women's Individual Championship. 1st place - Beijing, China
- 1994.1–26 May, Chinese National Women's Individual Championship. 1st place - Beijing, China
- 1994. June, Asian Girls Junior Chess Championship. 1st place - Shah Alam, Malaysia
- 1994. September, World Girls Junior Chess Championship. 1st place - Matinhos, Brazil
- 1994.1–15 December, The 15th World Women's Olympiad team championship. 3rd place -Moscow, Russia
- 1996.14–27 May, Chinese National Individual Championship. 1st place - Tianjin, China
- 1996.14 September-2 October，The 16th World Women's Olympiad team championship. 2nd place - Yerevan, Armenia
- 1996.9–22 November, World Girls Junior Chess Championship. 1st place - Medellín, Colombia
- 1997.15–26 May, Chinese National Men's Individual Championship. 2nd place - Beijing, China
- 1998 29 September-12 October, The 17th World Women's Olympiad team championship. 1st place - Russia
- 2000.28 November - 12 December, The 18th World Women's Olympiad team championship. 1st place - Istanbul, Turkey
- 2001.27 November-13 December，World Women's Individual Championship. 1st place - Moscow, Russia]
- 2002. March. FIDE Grand Prix, Zhu was able to claim the win and knock Ruslan Ponomariov out of the tournament. This is possibly the only female player to ever beat the male world champion in any competitive sport. - Dubai, United Arab Emirates
- 2002, World Women's Olympiad team championship. 1st place - Slovenia
- 2005. March, Accoona Women's World Rapid Chess Championship. 1st place - New York City, United States
- 2006. July, The North Urals Cup. 2nd place - Krasnoturinsk, Russia
- 2006，Asian game Women's Individual. 3rd place - Doha, Qatar
- 2007.July, The North Urals Cup. 1st place - Krasnoturinsk, Russia
- 2007. November, Asian Indoor Games Women's Individual Rapid Championship. 1st place；Asian Indoor Games Women's Individual Blitz Championship. 2nd place - Macau
- 2009. November, Asian Indoor Games Women's Individual Rapid Championship. 2nd place - Ha Long, Vietnam
- 2010. November, Guangzhou Asian game Women's Individual. 8th place - Guangzhou, China
- 2011. December, Arab Games Women's Individual Chess Championship. 1st place; Arab Games Women's Individual Rapid Chess Championship. 1st place;Arab Games Women's Individual Blitz Chess Championship. 1st place - Doha, Qatar

== China Chess League ==
Zhu Chen plays for Zhejiang chess club in the China Chess League (CCL).

== See also ==
- Chess in China

Preceded by Qin Kanying	Women's Chinese Chess Champion; 1992	Succeeded by Peng Zhaoqin
Preceded by Peng Zhaoqin	Women's Chinese Chess Champion; 1994	Succeeded by Qin Kanying
Preceded by Qin Kanying	Women's Chinese Chess Champion; 1996	Succeeded by Wang Lei
Preceded by Xie Jun	Women's World Chess Champion; 2001–2004	Succeeded by Antoaneta Stefanova
