= Qin Kanying =

Chinese chess player (born 1974)

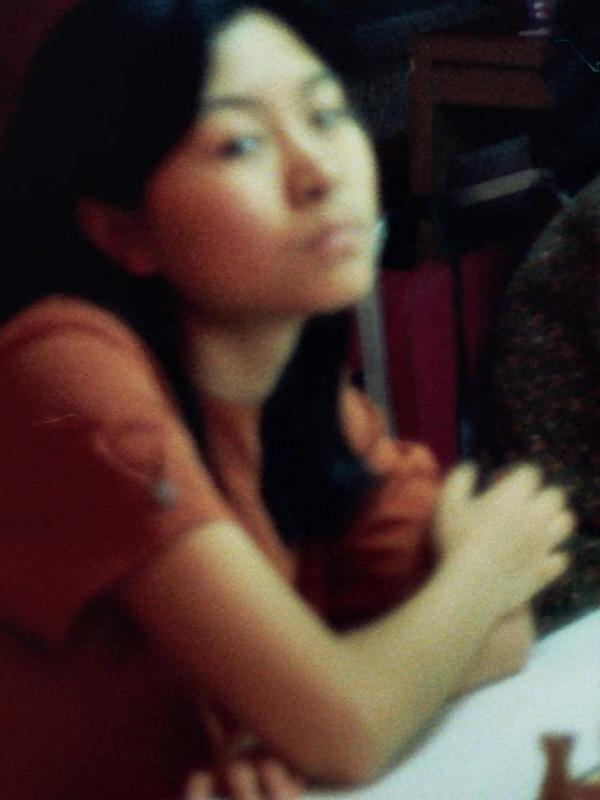
- Manila 1992

Personal information
- Born: 2 February 1974 (age 52) Shanghai, China
- Spouse: Peng Xiaomin

Chess career
- Country: China
- Title: Woman Grandmaster (1992)
- FIDE rating: 2466 (August 2026)
- Peak rating: 2501 (July 2000)

Qin Kanying (simplified Chinese: 秦侃滢; traditional Chinese: 秦侃瀅; pinyin: Qín Kǎnyìng; born 2 February 1974) is a Chinese chess player who holds the FIDE title of Woman Grandmaster. She is a former Women's World Chess Championship runner-up and five-time Chinese women's champion.

== Career ==
Qin Kanying won the Women's Chinese Chess Championship in 1988, 1991, 1995, 1999 and 2004. She finished sixth at the 1991 Women's Interzonal Tournament in Subotica to qualify for the 1992 Women's Candidates Tournament, held in Shanghai. In this latter event she placed fifth out of nine participants. Qin reached the final of the Women's World Chess Championship 2000 in New Delhi after she sequentially knocked out Masha Klinova, Ketevan Arakhamia-Grant, Ketino Kachiani-Gersinska, Corina Peptan and Alisa Marić. In the final she faced defending champion Xie Jun, who retained her title by winning 2½-1½ in a four-game match. Also in 2000, Qin finished second in the Asian Women's Championship in Udaipur.

Qin played on the Chinese team at the Women's Chess Olympiad in 1990, 1992 and 1994, winning each time the team bronze medal. In the 1992 Olympiad she also won an individual bronze medal thanks to her score of 77,3% (six wins, five draws and no losses) on board three.

== Personal life ==
Qin is married to chess grandmaster Peng Xiaomin, who is also her trainer.

Preceded by Peng Zhaoqin; Peng Zhaoqin; Zhu Chen; Wang Lei; Xu Yuanyuan	Women's Chinese Chess Champion; 1988; 1991; 1995; 1999; 2004	Succeeded by Xie Jun; Zhu Chen; Zhu Chen; Wang Lei; Wang Yu
