= World Chess Championship 2024 =

Chess match between Ding Liren and Gukesh Dommaraju

- Resorts World Sentosa, Singapore
- 25 November – 12 December 2024
	Defending champion	Challenger
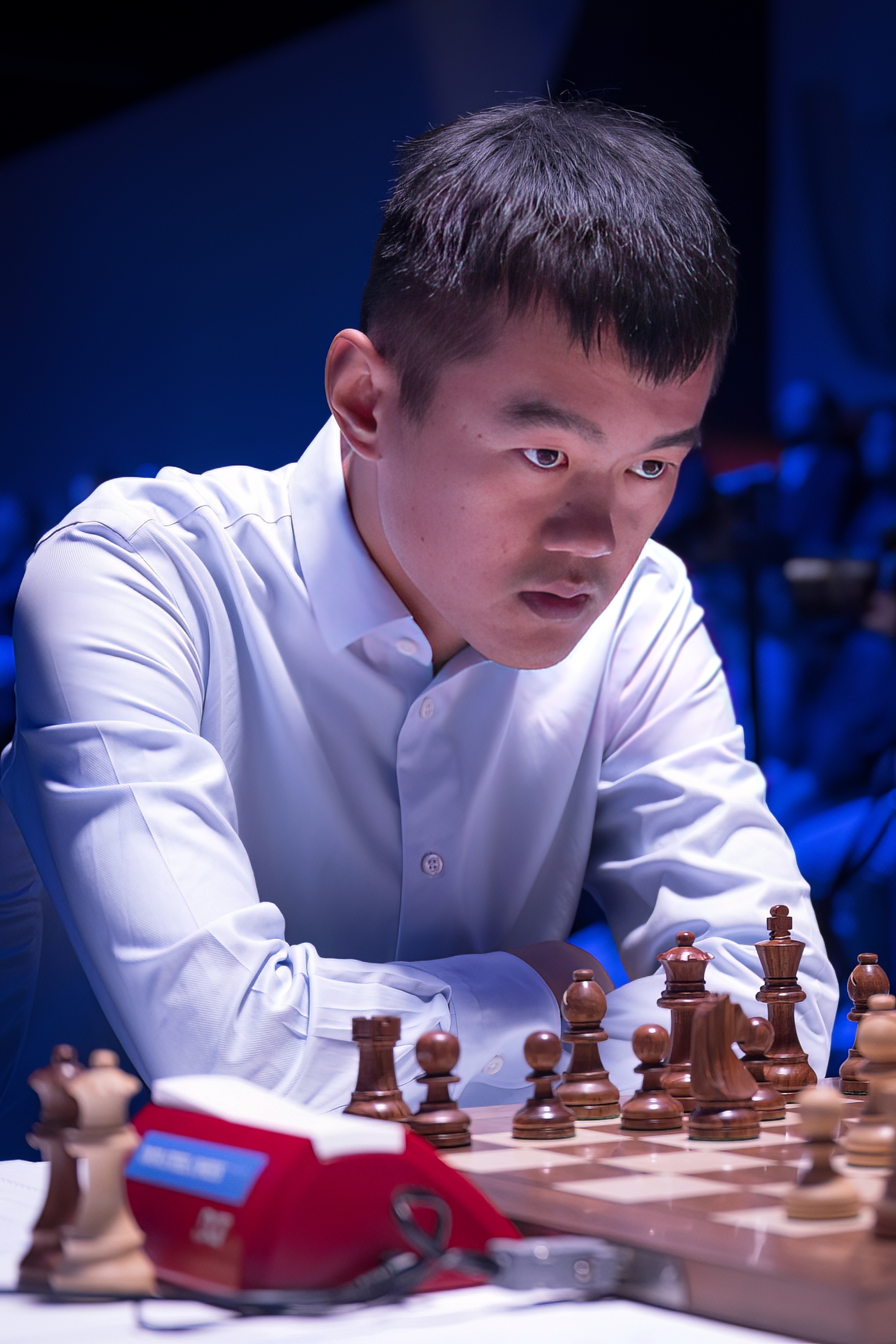
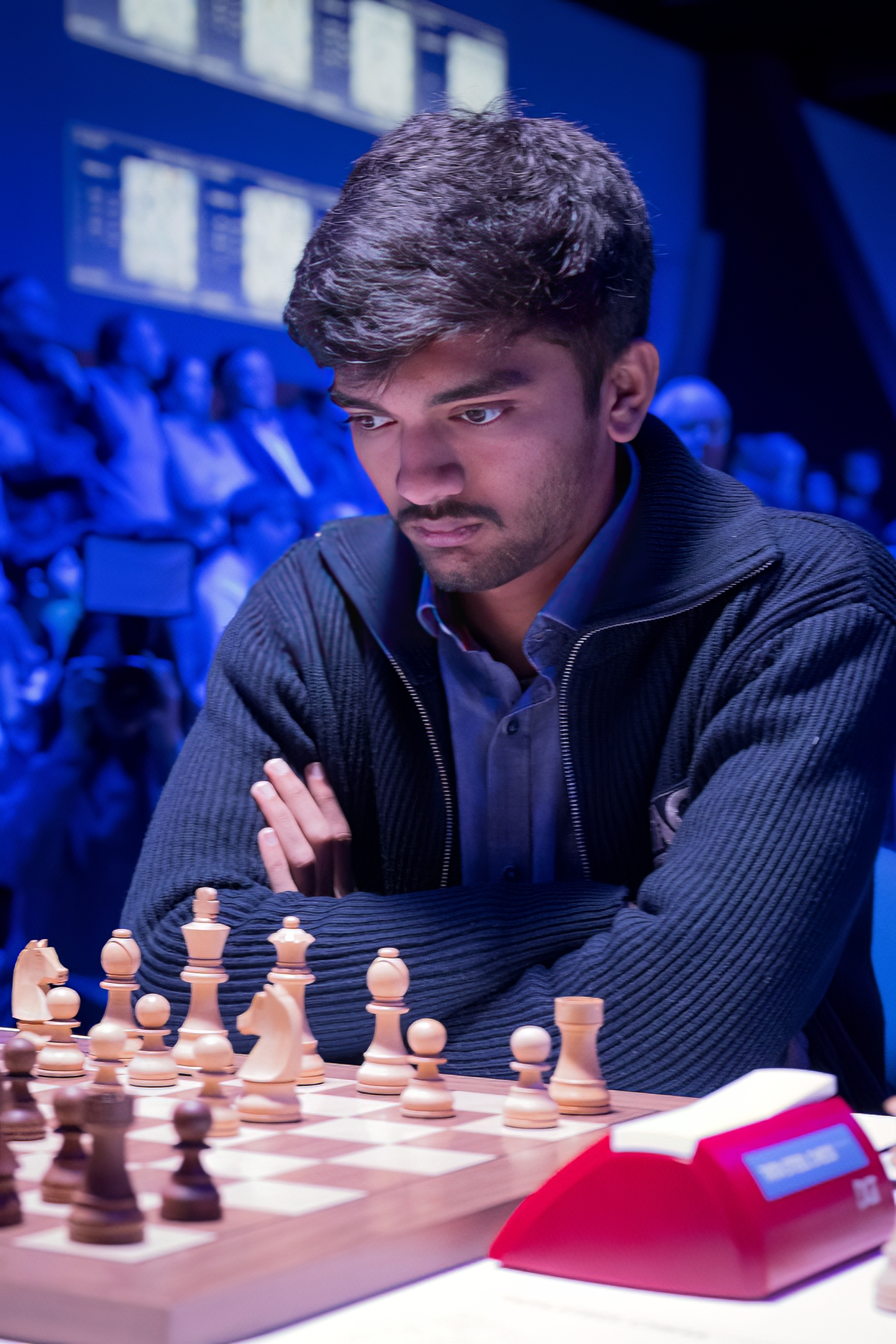
	(China) Ding Liren	(India) Gukesh Dommaraju
6½	Scores	7½
	Born 24 October 1992; 32 years old	Born 29 May 2006; 18 years old
	Winner of the World Chess Championship 2023	Winner of the Candidates Tournament 2024
	Rating: 2728 (World No. 23)	Rating: 2783 (World No. 5)

The World Chess Championship 2024 was a chess match between the reigning world champion Ding Liren and the challenger Gukesh Dommaraju to determine the World Chess Champion. The match took place between 25 November and 12 December 2024 in Singapore. It was played to a best of 14 games, with tiebreaks if required. The match was won by Gukesh 7½–6½ after 14 games. The win made Gukesh, at age 18, the youngest undisputed open-category world champion. (Note: Ruslan Ponomariov was slightly younger when he won the divided 2002 FIDE World Chess Championship, while Hou Yifan was 16 years old when she won the Women's World Chess Championship 2010.)

Ding Liren won the 2023 World Chess Championship by defeating Ian Nepomniachtchi, after reigning champion Magnus Carlsen declined to defend his title. Gukesh won the eight-player Candidates Tournament held in April 2024 to win the right to challenge Ding for the World Championship. Before the start of the match, Gukesh was ranked fifth in the FIDE rankings with an Elo rating of 2783, while Ding was ranked 23rd with an Elo rating of 2727.

Ding won two games and Gukesh won three. The 14th and final game ended with Gukesh winning the game and match with the black pieces after Ding resigned following a blunder that allowed Gukesh to simplify the position to a winning king and pawn versus king endgame.

== Defending champion ==
Ding Liren became World Chess Champion in April 2023, after defeating Ian Nepomniachtchi in the 2023 championship match; Ding had finished second to Nepomniachtchi in the Candidates Tournament 2022, but when reigning champion Magnus Carlsen chose not to defend his title, Ding replaced Carlsen in the 2023 match. After acquiring the title, Ding did not appear in professional tournaments for months, an absence which Ding later revealed in interviews to be due to fatigue and depression. Ding withdrew from tournaments including the 2023 Asian Games and did not enter the first four events of the 2024 Grand Chess Tour. He returned to classical chess in January 2024 at the 2024 Tata Steel Chess Tournament and announced that he still intended to defend his world champion title.

Ding's return to chess introduced a rough stretch of form, with a set of poor performances at the 2024 Tata Steel Masters, Norway Chess, and the Grenke Chess Classic. Ding's rating fell from 2788 (at the time of the World Chess Championship 2023) to 2728, while his world ranking fell from world number 3 to world number 23. His poor results led several chess grandmasters to express concern about Ding's overall ability to defend his world championship title, notably Fabiano Caruana, Magnus Carlsen and Hikaru Nakamura. However, while acknowledging Ding's weakened physical condition during the 2024 Sinquefield Cup, Anish Giri highlighted Ding's improved chess level during the first half of the tournament. Ding's opponent in the 2023 match, Ian Nepomniachtchi, also remarked on Caruana's podcast that Ding would be a clear favorite if he were in prime form.

Reflecting on his poor form in an interview during the 45th Chess Olympiad, Ding admitted that Gukesh is "playing extremely well in this tournament. Maybe he is a favorite in the World Championship Match. He also has a higher rating than me". Ding also remarked "[I have] dropped a lot since last year, but I will fight my best to try to overcome the rating difference".

== Candidates Tournament ==
The challenger, Gukesh Dommaraju, qualified by winning the Candidates Tournament 2024 in Toronto, Canada, which was an eight-player double round-robin tournament. It took place from April 3 to April 22, 2024. Fabiano Caruana won the 2023 FIDE Circuit, but had already qualified for the Candidates through the Chess World Cup 2023. Hence, Gukesh qualified for the Candidates via the FIDE Circuit, after overtaking Anish Giri with a win at the Chennai Grand Masters tournament.

The eight players who competed were:

Qualification method	Player	Age	Rating	World ranking
Qualification method	Player	(April 2024)		
2023 World Championship runner-up	(FIDE) Ian Nepomniachtchi (Note: Russian players' flags are displayed as the FIDE flag, as Russian and Belarusian flags have been banned from FIDE-rated events in response to the Russian invasion of Ukraine.)	33	2758	7
The top three finishers in the Chess World Cup 2023 (Note: The regulations stated that it would be the top three finishers other than Ding and Nepomniachtchi. (And that if both finished in the top four of the World Cup, then the World Cup qualifiers would be the other two players in the top four; and two players with the highest rating in the January 2024 ranking list would qualify for the event instead of one). However neither of these players reached the World Cup semifinals: Ding elected not to play, and Nepomniachtchi lost in the fifth round.)	(Norway) ~~Magnus Carlsen~~ (winner, withdrew)	33	2830	1
The top three finishers in the Chess World Cup 2023	(India) R Praggnanandhaa (runner-up)	18	2747	14
The top three finishers in the Chess World Cup 2023	(United States) Fabiano Caruana (third place)	31	2803	2
The top three finishers in the Chess World Cup 2023	(Azerbaijan) Nijat Abasov (fourth place, replacement for Carlsen)	28	2632	114
The top two finishers in the FIDE Grand Swiss Tournament 2023	(India) Vidit Gujrathi (winner)	29	2727	25
The top two finishers in the FIDE Grand Swiss Tournament 2023	(United States) Hikaru Nakamura (runner-up)	36	2789	3
Highest place in the 2023 FIDE Circuit not already qualified (Note: Fabiano Caruana finished first in the 2023 FIDE Circuit, but had already qualified for the Candidates through a third place finish at the Chess World Cup 2023. As a result, the qualifying spot was awarded to the highest finisher of the FIDE Circuit who had not already qualified for the event (Gukesh Dommaraju).)	(India) Gukesh Dommaraju	17	2743	16
Highest rating for January 2024 not already qualified (Note: Provided the player has played at least 4 classical time control tournaments eligible for the 2023 FIDE Circuit.)	(France) Alireza Firouzja	20	2760	6

=== Results ===
Standings of the 2024 Candidates Tournament
Rank	Player	Score	SB	Wins	Qualification	GUK		NAK		NEP		CAR		PRA		VID		FIR		ABA	
1	Gukesh Dommaraju (IND)	9 / 14	57	5	Advanced to title match			½	½	½	½	½	½	½	1	½	1	1	0	1	1
2	Hikaru Nakamura (USA)	8.5 / 14	56	5		½	½			½	½	1	½	½	1	0	0	1	1	1	½
3	Ian Nepomniachtchi (FIDE)	8.5 / 14	56	3		½	½	½	½			½	½	½	½	1	1	1	½	½	½
4	Fabiano Caruana (USA)	8.5 / 14	54	4		½	½	½	0	½	½			½	1	1	½	1	½	1	½
5	R Praggnanandhaa (IND)	7 / 14	42.5	3		0	½	0	½	½	½	0	½			½	1	½	½	1	1
6	Vidit Gujrathi (IND)	6 / 14	40.25	3		0	½	1	1	0	0	½	0	0	½			1	½	½	½
7	Alireza Firouzja (FRA)	5 / 14	32.75	2		1	0	0	0	½	0	½	0	½	½	½	0			1	½
8	Nijat Abasov (AZE)	3.5 / 14	25.5	0		0	0	½	0	½	½	½	0	0	0	½	½	½	0		

Tie-breakers for first place: (1) results in tie-break games for first place;

Tie-breakers for non-first place: (1) results in tie-break games for first place, if any; (2) Sonneborn–Berger score (SB); (3) total number of wins; (4) head-to-head score among tied players; (5) drawing of lots.

Note: Numbers in the crosstable in a white background indicate the result playing the respective opponent with the white pieces (black pieces if on a black background). This does not give information which of the two games was played in the first half of the tournament, and which in the second.

== Championship match ==
=== Organisation ===
Bids were originally to be presented to FIDE no later than 31 May 2024. Preliminary interest was expressed in early 2024 by Argentina, India, and Singapore.

In June 2024, FIDE CEO Emil Sutovsky announced that FIDE had received three bids to host the championship, two from India (Chennai and New Delhi), and one from Singapore. In July 2024, FIDE announced that the match would take place in Singapore from 20 November to 15 December 2024, with four venues being considered. Ultimately, the Singapore Chess Federation revealed that the Equarius Hotel at Resorts World Sentosa was chosen as the venue to host the world championship match. The main sponsor of the event was Google.

The prize fund allocated for the event was US$2.5 million. Each player received US$200,000 for each game won (including forfeits), and the remainder of the money was split equally. If there was a tiebreak, however, the winner would receive US$1.3 million and the loser would receive US$1.2 million. That would also have been the distribution if the final score was 7½–6½ with 13 decisive games or 8–6 with 14 decisive games.

The first move of each classical game was ceremonially performed by guests invited by the organizers:

Game	Guest	
1	Demis Hassabis	Co-founder of Google DeepMind and 2024 Nobel Prize in Chemistry winner
2	Tan Lian Ann	Singaporean chess master
2	Lim Kok Ann (Note: As Lim Kok Ann died in 2003, his daughter Stella Kon made the first move for Black in his place.)	Singaporean chess player and microbiologist
3	Olivier Lim	Chairman of the Singapore Tourism Board
4	Xie Jun	Women's World Chess Champion (1991–1996; 1999–2001)
4	Viswanathan Anand	Deputy President of FIDE and World Chess Champion (FIDE split title 2000–2002; undisputed champion 2007–2013)
5	K. Shanmugam	Minister for Home Affairs and Minister for Law of Singapore
6	Scott Beaumont	President of Google's operations in the Asia–Pacific region
7	Edwin Tong	Minister for Culture, Community and Youth and Second Minister for Law of Singapore
8	Kingston Kwek	Singaporean entrepreneur
8	Kevin Goh Wei Ming	Singaporean chess grandmaster and CEO of the Singapore Chess Federation
9	Shilpak Ambule	High Commissioner of India to Singapore
10	Kon Yin Tong	Chairman of Sport Singapore
11	Eugene Torre	Filipino chess grandmaster
11	Hou Yifan	Women's World Chess Champion (2010–2012; 2013–2015; 2016–2017) and second highest-rated female player in history
12	Zhu Jing	Chargé d'affaires ad interim of the Chinese Embassy in Singapore
13	Arkady Dvorkovich	President of FIDE
14	Hsu Li Yang	President of the Singapore Chess Federation

=== Match regulations ===
The regulations and format of the match were slightly different from the 2023 edition.

The time control for each game in the classical portion of the match was 120 minutes per side for the first 40 moves and 30 minutes for the rest of the game, with a 30-second increment per move starting from move 41.

The match was a best of 14 games; a score of at least 7½ won the world championship. If the score was equal after 14 games, tiebreak games with faster time controls would be played:

- A match consisting of 4 rapid games with 15 minutes per side and a 10-second increment starting with move 1 would be played. If a player scored 2½ points or more, he would win the championship.
- If the score was still equal, a mini-match of two rapid games would be played, with 10 minutes per side and a 5-second increment starting with move 1. If a player scored 1½ points or more, he would win the championship.
- If the score was equal after the rapid portion, a mini-match of two blitz games would be played, with a time control of 3 minutes per side and a 2-second increment starting with move 1. If a player scored 1½ points or more, he would win the championship. A drawing of lots would take place before each mini-match to decide which player played with the white pieces.
- If the blitz mini-match was tied, a single blitz game with a time control of 3 minutes per side and a 2-second increment starting with move 1 would be played, and the winner would win the championship. A drawing of lots would decide which player played with the white pieces. If this game was drawn, another blitz game with reversed colors would be played with the same time control, and the winner would win the championship. This process would be repeated until either player won a game.

Players were not allowed to agree to a draw before Black's 40th move. A draw claim before then was only permitted if a threefold repetition or stalemate had occurred.

=== Previous head-to-head record ===
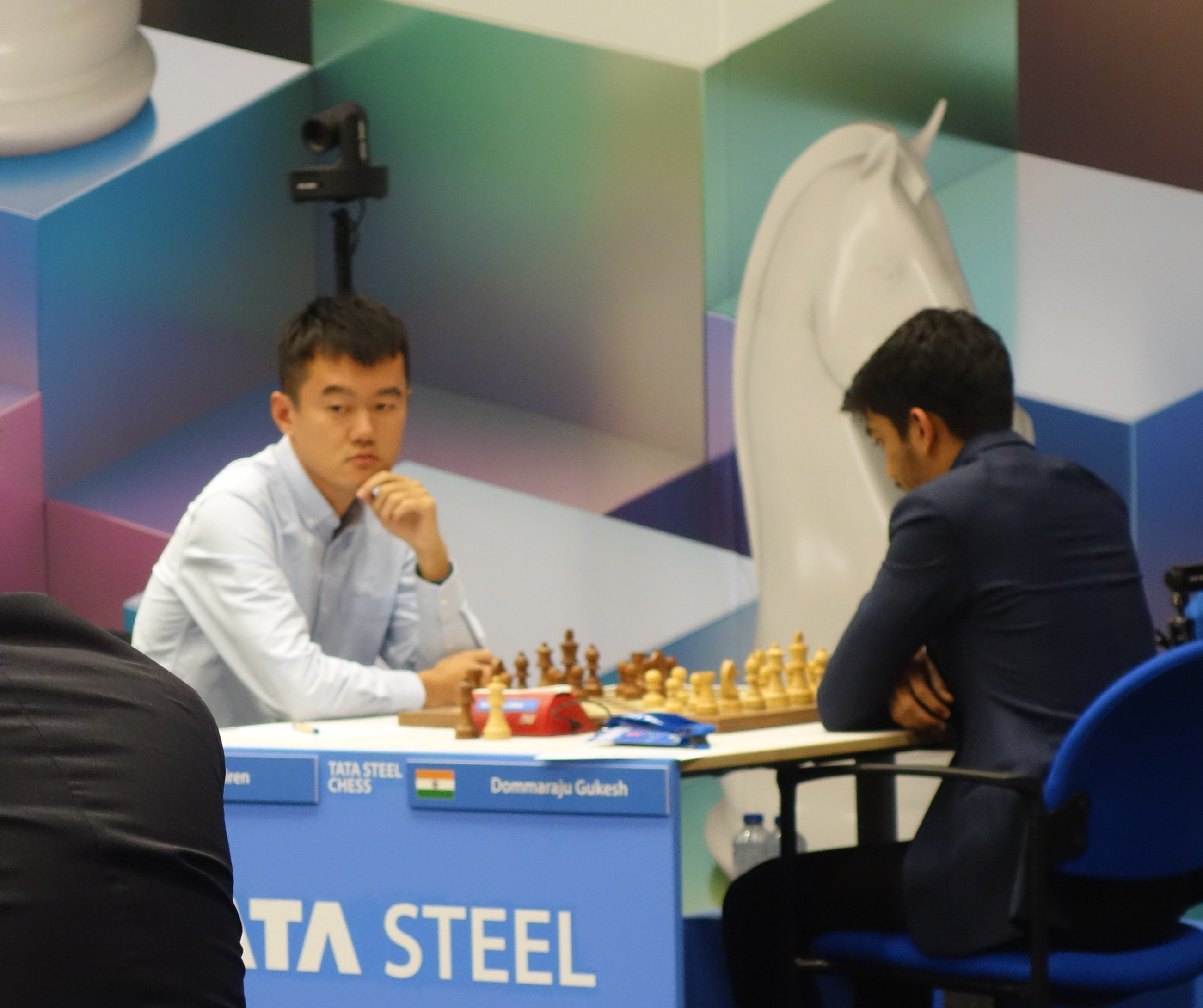
Ding (left) and Gukesh (right) during the 2023 Tata Steel Chess Tournament

Prior to the match, Ding and Gukesh had played against each other three times in classical time controls. Ding won two games with the black pieces during the 2023 and 2024 editions of the Tata Steel Chess Tournament, while their most recent pre-championship game during the 2024 Sinquefield Cup resulted in a draw.

Head-to-head record
		Ding wins	Draw	Gukesh wins	Total
Classical	Ding (white) – Gukesh (black)	0	1	0	1
Classical	Gukesh (white) – Ding (black)	2	0	0	2
Classical	Total	2	1	0	3
Blitz / rapid / exhibition		0	1	1	2
Total		2	2	1	5

A poll of various grandmasters before the match began found Gukesh a substantial favorite, mainly because of Ding's poor form over the past couple of months. In an October 2024 interview, Gukesh commented that he generally did not "believe in predictions and who are the favorites", and stated that he tried to "be at [his] best every day and play a good game".

=== Seconds ===
Before the match, Gukesh specified that he was working with Grzegorz Gajewski, who was also his second during the 2024 Candidates Tournament. After the match, Gukesh revealed further seconds that supported him before and during the match. (Note: Gukesh's other seconds, revealed in the post-match press conference, included Radosław Wojtaszek, Pentala Harikrishna, Vincent Keymer, Jan-Krzysztof Duda, and Jan Klimkowski.) Cricket coach Paddy Upton was on Gukesh's team as a mental conditioning coach. Ding Liren was working with Richárd Rapport, who was also his main second in the 2023 championship, and Ni Hua.

=== Schedule ===
The games began at 17:00 SGT (UTC+8:00).

Colors were drawn at the opening ceremony. Gukesh received the white pieces for the first game. Colors alternated thereafter, with no switching at the halfway point.

Date	Event
Saturday, 23 November	Media day, opening ceremony, and technical meeting
Sunday, 24 November	Rest day
Monday, 25 November	Game 1
Tuesday, 26 November	Game 2
Wednesday, 27 November	Game 3
Thursday, 28 November	Rest day
Friday, 29 November	Game 4
Saturday, 30 November	Game 5
Sunday, 1 December	Game 6
Monday, 2 December	Rest day
Tuesday, 3 December	Game 7
Wednesday, 4 December	Game 8
Thursday, 5 December	Game 9
Friday, 6 December	Rest day
Saturday, 7 December	Game 10
Sunday, 8 December	Game 11
Monday, 9 December	Game 12
Tuesday, 10 December	Rest day
Wednesday, 11 December	Game 13
Thursday, 12 December	Game 14
Friday, 13 December	Closing ceremony

Tie-breaks were initially scheduled for 13 December, in which case the closing ceremony would have been held on 14 December. Since tie-breaks proved unnecessary, the closing ceremony was moved ahead to 13 December. There were likewise plans to move it forward if the match had concluded in less than fourteen games.

=== Results ===
World Chess Championship 2024
	Rating	Match games														Points
	Rating	1	2	3	4	5	6	7	8	9	10	11	12	13	14	Points
Gukesh Dommaraju (IND)	2783	0	½	1	½	½	½	½	½	½	½	1	0	½	1	7½
Ding Liren (CHN)	2728	1	½	0	½	½	½	½	½	½	½	0	1	½	0	6½

=== Classical games ===
==== Game 1: Gukesh–Ding, 0–1 ====
Gukesh–Ding, game 1

Position: c8 black rook, e8 black king, h8 black rook, b7 black pawn, d7 black bishop, e7 black bishop, f7 black pawn, g7 black pawn, h7 black pawn, e6 black pawn, d5 black pawn, e5 white pawn, f5 white pawn, b4 white pawn, d4 white knight, g4 white pawn, a3 black pawn, c3 white pawn, d3 black queen, e3 white queen, a2 white pawn, b2 black knight, f2 white bishop, g2 white bishop, h2 white pawn, c1 white rook, f1 white rook, g1 white king

Position after 21...Qd3. Gukesh had planned 22.Qf4, before noticing that this move allows 22...g5! 23.Qg3 Qxg3 24.Bxg3 0-0 intending ...Bd8–b6, giving Black the better endgame. Nonetheless, this was still preferable to Gukesh's 22.Qe1? Although this move defends the c3-pawn, White's passive pieces give an overwhelming advantage to Black.

The first game of the match, a 42-move win for Ding, was played on 25 November. Ding surprised observers by playing the French Defense, an opening that he had previously played in game 7 of the World Chess Championship 2023 against Ian Nepomniachtchi. He then spent 28 minutes thinking on move seven while in a still relatively well-known position. Meanwhile, Gukesh was still in his preparation, blitzing out the attacking novelty 10.g4!? Ding's 10...Qa5, however, took Gukesh out of his preparation as Xie Jun believed "they haven't played this line before. They analyzed, they prepared, and they probably knew the plans, but this is the first time they gave it on the board. It's a very complicated position – the way they played is a little bit out of control."

Down on the clock in a complicated middlegame, Ding quickly spotted 18...Nb2! with queenside play, putting pressure on both Gukesh's position and his clock. With Ding's pieces infiltrating his position, Gukesh faltered with 22.Qe1? and his position crumbled. Ding made a slight inaccuracy with 27...fxe6?! (correct was 27...Bxe6!), allowing Gukesh to salvage the game, but although Gukesh spotted the idea, he executed incorrectly. Ding made no further errors and converted his advantage to a win, his first in classical chess since he defeated Max Warmerdam in January during the Tata Steel Chess Tournament 2024. This also marked the first time in 14 years that a win was registered in Game 1, after Veselin Topalov defeated Viswanathan Anand with the white pieces during the World Chess Championship 2010.

At the post-game press conference, Ding was elated with his performance, stating, "Well, of course I feel very good—I haven't won a single classical game for a long time and I managed to do that!" Gukesh on the other hand remarked, "It was just a tactical oversight by me. It can happen, it's a long match, and about my opponent's form, I think I expected nothing else. I expected the best version of him, and we have a long match ahead, so it's only more exciting now!"

French Defense, Steinitz Variation (ECO C11)
1. e4 e6 2. d4 d5 3. Nc3 Nf6 4. e5 Nfd7 5. f4 c5 6. Nce2 Nc6 7. c3 a5 8. Nf3 a4 9. Be3 Be7 10. g4 Qa5 11. Bg2 a3 12. b3 cxd4 13. b4 Qc7 14. Nexd4 Nb6 15. 0-0 Nc4 16. Bf2 Bd7 17. Qe2 Nxd4 18. Nxd4 Nb2 19. Qe3 Rc8 20. Rac1 Qc4 21. f5 Qd3 (diagram) 22. Qe1 Bg5 23. Rc2 Rc4 24. h4 Bf4 25. Qb1 Rxc3 26. Rxc3 Qxc3 27. fxe6 fxe6 28. Ne2 Qxe5 29. Nxf4 Qxf4 30. Qc2 Qc4 31. Qd2 0-0 32. Bd4 Nd3 33. Qe3 Rxf1+ 34. Bxf1 e5 35. Bxe5 Qxg4+ 36. Bg2 Bf5 37. Bg3 Be4 38. Kh2 h6 39. Bh3 Qd1 40. Bd6 Qc2+ 41. Kg3 Qxa2 42. Be6+ Kh8 0–1

==== Game 2: Ding–Gukesh, ½–½ ====
Ding–Gukesh, game 2

Position: a8 black rook, d8 black queen, e8 black king, h8 black rook, b7 black pawn, c7 black pawn, f7 black pawn, g7 black pawn, a6 black pawn, c6 black knight, d6 black pawn, f6 black knight, h6 black pawn, a5 white pawn, c5 black bishop, e5 black pawn, c4 white pawn, e4 white pawn, c3 white knight, e3 white bishop, f3 white knight, b2 white pawn, c2 white pawn, f2 white pawn, g2 white pawn, h2 white pawn, a1 white rook, d1 white queen, f1 white rook, g1 white king

Position after 10.dxc4. Gukesh can win material with 10...Bb4!? 11.Nd5 Nxe4, when 12.Qd3! Nc5 13.Qf5 Ne6 leads to complicated play. Gukesh also had the option to play 10...Bxe3, doubling and isolating White's pawns on the e-file, leading to a balanced but nuanced position. Ding's previous World Championship opponent, Ian Nepomniachtchi, expected the latter and was surprised Gukesh opted for 10...0-0.

The second game of the match, a 23-move draw, was played on 26 November. After Ding opted for the traditional Giuoco Pianissimo, commentator David Howell expressed surprise at the choice of 1.e4, noting that "He rarely employs the king's pawn openings until the last few months, when he has been experimenting a bit with it – he doesn't seem like a natural e4 player to me, but here we are!" Ding chose a quiet line, but offered Gukesh complicated play with 10.dxc4, inviting 10...Bb4!?. Aware that he was facing preparation, Gukesh declined. In a balanced position, Ding had a slight opportunity to play on with 20.h4, creating less space for his opponent, but the position would have remained even. Ding instead chose to repeat moves, resulting in a draw.

At the post-game press conference, Gukesh stated, "This early, with Black, was nowhere close to a must-win. I was never going to do anything stupid." Ding made comments to the same effect, remarking that "I was feeling a little up and down. I was slightly worse in the middle game. I thought I had misplayed."

Italian Game, Giuoco Pianissimo (ECO C50)
1. e4 e5 2. Nf3 Nc6 3. Bc4 Bc5 4. d3 Nf6 5. Nc3 a6 6. a4 d6 7. 0-0 h6 8. Be3 Be6 9. a5 Bxc4 10. dxc4 (diagram) 0-0 11. Bxc5 dxc5 12. b3 Qxd1 13. Rfxd1 Rad8 14. Rdc1 Nd4 15. Ne1 Rd6 16. Kf1 g6 17. Rd1 Rfd8 18. f3 Kg7 19. Kf2 h5 20. Ne2 Nc6 21. Nc3 Nd4 22. Ne2 Nc6 23. Nc3 Nd4 ½–½

==== Game 3: Gukesh–Ding, 1–0 ====
Gukesh–Ding, game 3

Position: a8 black rook, e8 black king, f8 black bishop, h8 black rook, a7 black pawn, b7 black pawn, d7 black knight, f7 black pawn, g7 black knight, c6 black pawn, g6 black pawn, d5 black pawn, g5 white pawn, d4 white pawn, b3 white pawn, c3 white knight, f3 white pawn, g3 white bishop, b2 white pawn, c2 black bishop, d2 white knight, e2 white pawn, a1 white rook, e1 white king, f1 white bishop, g1 white rook

Position after 18.Bg3

The third game of the match, a 37-move win for Gukesh, was played on 27 November. Gukesh opted for a Queen's Gambit Declined with an early cxd5. In the opening, Ding intentionally got his bishop trapped with 10...Bc2. The game followed a previous game between Vladimir Kramnik and Arjun Erigaisi played in the World Rapid Team Championship 2023 until Ding's 13...Nbd7! After 14.Nd2 threatening to win Black's bishop with Rc1, Ding played 14...Rg8!, threatening ...g5 which counterattacks White's bishop and creates an escape for Black's. Gukesh responded by playing g5 himself, and both players believed the position to be good for White, but computer analysis suggests otherwise. Ding's 18...Rh5 was a mistake, leading to a sequence where Ding loses a bishop for two pawns; it was preferable to retreat the bishop immediately with 18...Bf5, or fight for the advantage with 18...Be7!. Gukesh re-trapped the bishop with 19.e4! and went on to precisely convert his advantage. Ding lost on time while executing his final move 37...Rh5, but his position was lost anyway (38.Bxf5! wins).

Queen's Gambit Declined, Exchange Variation (ECO D35)
1. d4 Nf6 2. Nf3 d5 3. c4 e6 4. cxd5 exd5 5. Nc3 c6 6. Qc2 g6 7. h3 Bf5 8. Qb3 Qb6 9. g4 Qxb3 10. axb3 Bc2 11. Bf4 h5 12. Rg1 hxg4 13. hxg4 Nbd7 14. Nd2 Rg8 15. g5 Nh5 16. Bh2 Rh8 17. f3 Ng7 18. Bg3 (diagram) Rh5 19. e4 dxe4 20. fxe4 Ne6 21. Rc1 Nxd4 22. Bf2 Bg7 23. Ne2 Nxb3 24. Rxc2 Nxd2 25. Kxd2 Ne5 26. Nd4 Rd8 27. Ke2 Rh2 28. Bg2 a6 29. b3 Rd7 30. Rcc1 Ke7 31. Rcd1 Ke8 32. Bg3 Rh5 33. Nf3 Nxf3 34. Kxf3 Bd4 35. Rh1 Rxg5 36. Bh3 f5 37. Bf4 Rh5 1–0

==== Game 4: Ding–Gukesh, ½–½ ====
Ding–Gukesh, game 4

Position: c8 black rook, d8 black queen, f8 black rook, g8 black king, a7 black pawn, f7 black pawn, g7 black pawn, h7 black bishop, b6 black pawn, c6 black pawn, f6 black knight, h6 black pawn, a5 white pawn, d5 black pawn, e5 black knight, b4 white pawn, d4 white knight, b3 white queen, c3 white knight, e3 white pawn, d2 white pawn, e2 white bishop, f2 white pawn, g2 white pawn, h2 white pawn, a1 white rook, f1 white rook, g1 white king

Position after 15...b6. Ding should not play the natural-looking 16.f4, because 16...Nc4! gives Black a much better position (White can't win the seemingly free pawn because after 17.Bxc4 dxc4 18.Qxc4 c5 19.bxc5 bxc5 20.Nf3, Black has 20...Bd3 forking White's queen and rook). Computer analysis suggests White has minute winning chances after 16.Ba6 Rc7 17.f4 Ng6 (17...Nc4 no longer works because of 18.Bxc4 dxc4 19.Qxc4 c5 20.Ncb5! attacking the rook), but Ding went for the drawing move 16.Nf3.

The fourth game of the match, a 42-move draw, was played on 29 November. Ding played an unconventional system beginning with 1.Nf3, resembling a Queen's Indian Defense with colors reversed, which surprised Gukesh but was not particularly aggressive. At the post-game press conference, Ding revealed that he intended to "play it safe", but that he took some risk with 11.b4. Gukesh's 13...Ne5!? took Ding by surprise since the knight can be easily kicked out with f4, but Gukesh believed that, "[f4] looked like a move which would turn out to be risky in the long run". Gukesh's 15...b6 was Ding's last chance to push for a win with 16.Ba6, but after he played 16.Nf3, the game was headed for a draw. Pieces were traded and the two ended up in a queen-and-rook endgame where White has a four-on-three majority on the kingside, and Black has a passed pawn on the c-file. Despite the result being all-but-inevitable, Gukesh continued to play out the game and pose questions for Ding, notably with 30...f5!?. Shortly thereafter, however, the two made a draw by threefold repetition.

Nimzowitsch–Larsen Attack, Classical Variation (ECO A06)
1. Nf3 d5 2. e3 Nf6 3. b3 Bf5 4. Be2 h6 5. Ba3 Nbd7 6. 0-0 e6 7. Bxf8 Nxf8 8. c4 N8d7 9. Nc3 0-0 10. cxd5 exd5 11. b4 c6 12. Nd4 Bh7 13. Qb3 Ne5 14. a4 Rc8 15. a5 b6 (diagram) 16. Nf3 Nxf3+ 17. Bxf3 d4 18. Ne2 dxe3 19. dxe3 Be4 20. Rfd1 Qe7 21. Bxe4 Nxe4 22. axb6 axb6 23. Nc3 Rfd8 24. Nxe4 Qxe4 25. h3 c5 26. Rxd8+ Rxd8 27. bxc5 bxc5 28. Rc1 Qe5 29. Qc2 Rd5 30. g3 f5 31. Kg2 Kh7 32. Qc4 Qd6 33. e4 Re5 34. exf5 Rxf5 35. Qe4 Qd5 36. Qxd5 Rxd5 37. Kf3 Kg6 38. Ke4 Rd4+ 39. Ke3 Rd5 40. Ke4 Rd4+ 41. Ke3 Rd5 42. Ke4 Rd4+ ½–½

==== Game 5: Gukesh–Ding, ½–½ ====
Gukesh–Ding, game 5

Position: e8 black rook, f8 black king, a7 black pawn, b7 black pawn, d7 black bishop, f7 black pawn, g7 black pawn, b6 black knight, d5 black pawn, e5 black bishop, c4 black pawn, d4 white pawn, f4 black knight, c3 white pawn, g3 white bishop, a2 white pawn, b2 white pawn, c2 white bishop, d2 white knight, f2 white pawn, h2 white pawn, e1 white rook, g1 white king

Position after 22...Bxe5

The fifth game of the match, a 40-move draw, was played on 30 November. For the second time in the match, Ding played a French Defense. This time, however, Gukesh responded by exchanging the pawns on d5, and quickly traded off the queens and one pair of rooks. After Ding's 15...Nh5, Gukesh's dark-squared bishop had nowhere to escape, prompting Gukesh to play 17.g4!? after giving a check, which grandmaster Judit Polgár believed to be too risky. Nonetheless, the game seemed to be headed towards a draw, until Gukesh quickly played 23.dxe5? (a mistake, because after 23...Nd3 24.Bxd3 cxd3, Black has a passed pawn on the d-file two moves away from queening). In the post-game press conference, Gukesh revealed, "Once I saw Nd3 I realized I just blundered with dxe5. I didn't know how bad it was, really, but of course I should have played Rxe5. It would have been a draw anyway, but dxe5 Nd3 I kind of just hallucinated." Ding, however, was apparently unaware that he had a considerable advantage. As a result, he did not press very hard, and after 29...Bc6 (which Ding called "basically a draw offer"), Gukesh was able to stop the pawn and the players agreed to a draw.

French Defense, Exchange Variation (ECO C01)
1. e4 e6 2. d4 d5 3. exd5 exd5 4. Nf3 Nf6 5. Bd3 c5 6. c3 c4 7. Bc2 Bd6 8. Qe2+ Qe7 9. Qxe7+ Kxe7 10. 0-0 Re8 11. Re1+ Kf8 12. Rxe8+ Kxe8 13. Bg5 Nbd7 14. Nbd2 h6 15. Bh4 Nh5 16. Re1+ Kf8 17. g4 Nf4 18. Bg3 Nb6 19. g5 hxg5 20. Nxg5 Bd7 21. Ngf3 Re8 22. Ne5 Bxe5 (diagram) 23. dxe5 Nd3 24. Bxd3 cxd3 25. f3 Nc4 26. Nxc4 dxc4 27. Re4 Bc6 28. Rd4 Bxf3 29. Kf2 Bc6 30. Rxc4 Rd8 31. Rd4 Rxd4 32. cxd4 Bd5 33. b3 Ke7 34. Ke3 Ke6 35. Kxd3 g6 36. Kc3 a6 37. Kd3 Kf5 38. Ke3 Ke6 39. Kd3 Kf5 40. Ke3 Ke6 ½–½

==== Game 6: Ding–Gukesh, ½–½ ====
Ding–Gukesh, game 6

Position: b8 black rook, c8 black bishop, f8 black rook, g8 black king, a7 black pawn, f7 black pawn, g7 black pawn, h7 black pawn, c6 black pawn, c5 white queen, e5 white pawn, c4 white knight, e4 black pawn, c3 white pawn, e3 white pawn, a2 white pawn, b2 white pawn, f2 black queen, h2 white pawn, c1 white king, d1 white rook, h1 white rook

Position after 17.Nc4. Here, Gukesh intended to exchange the knight on c4 by playing the slightly inaccurate move 17...Be6!?. While Peter Leko believed that 17...Qg2 was a better move, it was one that he believed would have "simply not cross your mind". Alternatively, Anish Giri felt that Gukesh forgot in his preparation to play the move 17...Qf3!, and that by moving the bishop he put himself in a worse position. Despite Gukesh acknowledging this, he felt the move was hard to convert with White.

Position: e8 black rook, f8 black rook, g8 black king, a7 black pawn, f7 black pawn, h7 black pawn, g6 black pawn, d4 white rook, e4 black pawn, f4 white queen, a3 white pawn, c3 white pawn, e3 white pawn, f3 black queen, b2 white pawn, d2 white rook, h2 white pawn, c1 white king

Position after 33...Qf3. Here, Ding should avoid the exchange of queens and play 34.Qg5!, leaving his heavy pieces better placed than Gukesh's. Instead, he played 34.Kc2?!, allowing Gukesh to trade queens and get a passed pawn, which Ding called, "not such a good move" in the post-game press conference.

The sixth game of the match, a 46-move draw, was played on 1 December. Ding played the London System, an opening he won with in the sixth game of his previous match against Ian Nepomniachtchi. In the post-game press conference, Ding reflected on his opening choice: "This time, I tried to push for an advantage in the opening, and this London. Last time, also in game six, I won a beautiful game in the London, so this time I wanted to repeat that success." The opening was considered a success for Ding, and Gukesh made an early inaccuracy with 17...Be6 (see first diagram). Gukesh commented, "I never really felt in danger because I thought once I take on c4... maybe I'm slightly worse, but it should be really hard to convert it with White because you can't really push the queenside pawns that easily and you always have some play on his king." Ding had an early time advantage in the opening, but lost it after his 42-minute think before playing 21.Qxc6.

After Gukesh's 21...Qxe5, the players repeated the position twice, and Gukesh had the option to make a draw by threefold repetition by playing 26...Qe7!. Instead, he played 26...Qh4!?, declining the draw and accepting a slightly worse position. In the post-game press conference, Ding commented, "Qh4 came as a total surprise because I think his queen is not so well placed on the kingside; it's better placed on the queenside", while Gukesh explained his decision, "I thought I might be slightly worse, I was not even sure fully if I'm slightly worse, but I thought it's more likely, but I thought with the files open in front of his king I always have counterplay, and I saw no reason to take a repetition right now." Ding responded well to Gukesh's draw rejection, and Peter Leko believed his decision might have been "a huge mistake" and called the move "psychological games". Gukesh denied such, stating, "I just like playing chess! It was more just the position than it was psychological. I just thought there was a lot of play left in the position, and I did not really see too much danger for me." Later in the game, Ding accumulated a slight advantage, which reached its peak after Gukesh offered a queen trade with 33...Qf3 (see second diagram), but Ding responded incorrectly, and the game went on to end with a draw by repetition.

London System (ECO D02)
1. d4 Nf6 2. Bf4 d5 3. e3 e6 4. Nf3 c5 5. c3 Bd6 6. Bb5+ Nc6 7. Bxc6+ bxc6 8. Bxd6 Qxd6 9. Qa4 0-0 10. Qa3 Ne4 11. Nfd2 e5 12. Nxe4 dxe4 13. Qxc5 Qg6 14. Nd2 Qxg2 15. 0-0-0 Qxf2 16. dxe5 Rb8 17. Nc4 (first diagram) Be6 18. Rd2 Qf3 19. Re1 Bxc4 20. Qxc4 Qf5 21. Qxc6 Qxe5 22. Qd5 Qe7 23. Qd6 Qg5 24. Qd5 Qe7 25. Qd6 Qg5 26. Qd5 Qh4 27. Red1 g6 28. Qe5 Rbe8 29. Qg3 Qh5 30. Qf4 Qa5 31. a3 Qb5 32. Rd4 Qe2 33. R1d2 Qf3 (second diagram) 34. Kc2 Qxf4 35. exf4 f5 36. h4 e3 37. Re2 Re7 38. Kd3 Rfe8 39. h5 gxh5 40. Rd5 h4 41. Rxf5 Rd7+ 42. Kc2 Kg7 43. Rg2+ Kh8 44. Re2 Kg7 45. Rg2+ Kh8 46. Re2 Kg7 ½–½

==== Game 7: Gukesh–Ding, ½–½ ====
Gukesh–Ding, game 7

Position: a7 black pawn, d7 black rook, f7 black pawn, c6 white rook, b5 white pawn, e5 black king, f5 black pawn, e4 black knight, f3 white bishop, g3 white pawn, h3 white pawn, f2 white pawn, f1 white king

Position after 43...Ne4. Pushing the passed pawn with 44.h4! leads to a winning rook endgame after exchanging White's bishop for Black's knight, but Gukesh instead played the more natural 44.Ke1?!.

The seventh game of the match, a 72-move draw, was played on 3 December. It turned out to be a thrilling effort by both players. Out of a Neo-Grünfeld Defense, Gukesh played the new move 7.Re1, which introduced a completely new idea to theory. Ding reacted poorly with 9...c5?!, and Gukesh gained both a strong position and a significant time advantage. Under serious pressure, Ding went for the queen maneuver Qa6xa2, which GM Anish Giri assessed as the desperation of a player who knows they are in trouble, but wants to at least grab some material before losing. Although Gukesh was clearly winning, Ding's active queen posed problems, and after 30.Qf4?! Ding was able to steer the game to a worse-but-tenable endgame. Following the strong defensive move 34...Ng6! it seemed like Ding would save the position, but one move before the time control and with seven seconds left on the clock, Ding played 40...Ke5?, again giving Gukesh a winning position that was however difficult to win. Gukesh played the human move 44.Ke1?!, after which Ding found the deep resource 44...f6. Gukesh's 45.h4?! was a subtle inaccuracy, and following 46...f4! Ding had equalized the position. Gukesh still had practical winning chances, but Ding defended successfully to draw.

Many commentators later praised this game, with several calling it the best game of the match.

Neo-Grünfeld Defense, Classical Variation (ECO D78)
1. Nf3 d5 2. g3 g6 3. d4 Bg7 4. c4 c6 5. Bg2 Nf6 6. 0-0 0-0 7. Re1 dxc4 8. e4 Bg4 9. Nbd2 c5 10. d5 e6 11. h3 Bxf3 12. Bxf3 exd5 13. exd5 Nbd7 14. Nxc4 b5 15. Na3 Qb6 16. Bf4 Rfe8 17. Qd2 Rad8 18. Nc2 Nf8 19. b4 c4 20. Be3 Qa6 21. Bd4 Rxe1+ 22. Rxe1 Qxa2 23. Ra1 Qb3 24. Ra3 Qb1+ 25. Kg2 Rd7 26. Ra5 Qb3 27. Ra3 Qb1 28. Ra5 Qb3 29. Rxb5 Qd3 30. Qf4 Qxc2 31. Bxf6 Qf5 32. Qxf5 gxf5 33. Bxg7 Kxg7 34. Rc5 Ng6 35. Rxc4 Ne5 36. Rd4 Nc6 37. Rf4 Ne7 38. b5 Kf6 39. Rd4 h6 40. Kf1 Ke5 41. Rh4 Nxd5 42. Rxh6 Nc3 43. Rc6 Ne4 (diagram) 44. Ke1 f6 45. h4 Rd3 46. Bd1 f4 47. gxf4+ Kxf4 48. Bc2 Rd5 49. Rc4 f5 50. Rb4 Kf3 51. Bd1+ Kg2 52. Rb3 Re5 53. f4 Re7 54. Re3 Rh7 55. h5 Nf6 56. Re5 Nxh5 57. Rxf5 Ng3 58. Rf8 Rb7 59. Ba4 Kf3 60. f5 Kf4 61. f6 Ne4 62. Bc2 Nd6 63. Rd8 Ke5 64. Bb3 Nf7 65. Rd5+ Kxf6 66. Kd2 Rb6 67. Bc4 Rd6 68. Kc3 Rxd5 69. Bxd5 Nd6 70. Kb4 Nxb5 71. Kxb5 a6+ 72. Kxa6 ½–½

==== Game 8: Ding–Gukesh, ½–½ ====
Ding–Gukesh, game 8

Position: e8 black rook, g8 black king, d7 black knight, f7 black bishop, g7 black pawn, h7 black pawn, a6 black knight, b6 black queen, f6 black pawn, a5 black pawn, b5 black pawn, a3 white bishop, d3 white pawn, f3 white knight, g3 white pawn, a2 white pawn, e2 white pawn, g2 white bishop, h2 white pawn, b1 white rook, d1 white queen, f1 white king

Position after 24...cxb5. Ding's 25.Bb2?, intending Bd4 then Ra1, sacrifices the a2-pawn for tactical compensation. However, Ding had missed that Black does not have to move the queen (25...Bxa2 26.Bd4 Qb8 27.Ra1! is fine for White). Instead, 26...Ndc5!, removing the d7-knight from potential Bh3 tactics, is winning.

Position: g8 black king, c7 black rook, d7 black knight, g7 black pawn, h7 black pawn, b6 black queen, e6 black bishop, f6 black pawn, a5 black pawn, b5 black pawn, c5 black knight, d3 white pawn, e3 white bishop, f3 white knight, g3 white pawn, e2 white pawn, f2 white queen, g2 white bishop, h2 white pawn, c1 white rook, f1 white king

Position after 30...Rc7. White has a decisive advantage according to the computer, but the winning move – 31.Ne1!! (blocking the back rank such that a potential ...Rxc1 does not come with check) intending d4 to win material – was not easy to find. Kibitzing GM Matthew Sadler said that without engine assistance, he would have thought Black is obviously winning.

The eighth game of the match, a 51-move draw, was played on 4 December. Gukesh responded well to Ding's 1.c4, and put Ding in unfamiliar territory with 7...f6!?. The position was objectively equal, but Peter Leko believed Ding to be in "not a pleasant situation", facing an imbalanced position Gukesh was well-prepared for. Ding appeared to have made it out of the opening, albeit with a time disadvantage. That changed with 22.Rb1?, which allowed Gukesh to gain an advantage with 22...b5 23.cxb5 Qb6+ 24.Kf1 cxb5. Ding's position went from bad to worse with 25.Bb2?, allowing Gukesh to get two connected passed pawns on the queenside with 25...Bxa2. Gukesh quickly lost most of his advantage with 26...Nac5?! (26...Ndc5! was best). Gukesh explained that he thought Ndc5 "looked weird", and that he missed Ding's defensive resource 28.Qe1! (only evaluating the position after 28.Qd2?, which loses for White). Gukesh explained, "It was actually very impressive that my opponent found this Qe1 so quickly—so yes, great defense by him!" Qe1 not only allowed White to save the game, but gave White the chance to put pressure on Black. After Gukesh's 28...Be6?, Ding himself got an advantage, and eventually found himself up a rook for a knight and a pawn. Neither player, however, was aware that White was ever winning. In the post-game press conference, Gukesh stated, "I thought probably all my advantage is gone, but I did not think it was even bad for me. Now that I see the position it's quite obvious, but during the game it was not", whereas Ding stated, "In the last world championship, also one game he was winning at some point and then suddenly I'm winning at the end. But today during the game I didn't realize I was winning at some point. I think he missed some important details that let me get back into the game. Before that he was totally outplaying me, again." Due to his misevaluation, Ding began to make a draw by repetition, which was broken by Gukesh's 41...Qa2!? despite White having a better position. Gukesh reflected on this decision, "I didn't think I was in much danger. I always thought with his weak king and my strong pawn on b3 I should have play. I thought even I might have some chances, but okay, it was just a misjudgment of the position." The game continued with little challenge for either player, and they agreed to a draw after reaching an opposite-colored bishops endgame.

English Opening, Reversed Sicilian, Kramnik–Shirov Counterattack (ECO A21)
1. c4 e5 2. Nc3 Bb4 3. Nd5 Be7 4. Nf3 d6 5. g3 c6 6. Nxe7 Nxe7 7. Bg2 f6 8. 0-0 Be6 9. b3 d5 10. Ba3 0-0 11. Rc1 a5 12. Ne1 Re8 13. f4 exf4 14. Rxf4 dxc4 15. bxc4 Ng6 16. Re4 Na6 17. Nc2 Qc7 18. Nd4 Bf7 19. d3 Ne5 20. Nf3 Nd7 21. Rxe8+ Rxe8 22. Rb1 b5 23. cxb5 Qb6+ 24. Kf1 cxb5 (first diagram) 25. Bb2 Bxa2 26. Bd4 Nac5 27. Rc1 Bb3 28. Qe1 Be6 29. Qf2 Rc8 30. Be3 Rc7 (second diagram) 31. Nd4 Bf7 32. Nc6 Rxc6 33. Bxc6 Qxc6 34. Bxc5 h6 35. Ke1 b4 36. Qd4 Ne5 37. Kd2 Qg2 38. Qf2 Qd5 39. Qd4 Qg2 40. Qf2 Qd5 41. Qd4 Qa2+ 42. Rc2 Qe6 43. Qd8+ Kh7 44. Qxa5 b3 45. Rc1 Qd5 46. Qb4 Qg2 47. Qe4+ Qxe4 48. dxe4 b2 49. Rb1 Ba2 50. Rxb2 Nc4+ 51. Kc3 Nxb2 ½–½

==== Game 9: Gukesh–Ding, ½–½ ====
Gukesh–Ding, game 9

Position: d8 black rook, g8 black king, c7 black queen, e7 black bishop, f7 black pawn, g7 black pawn, h7 black pawn, a6 black rook, b6 black pawn, e6 black pawn, f6 black knight, b5 white queen, c5 black pawn, c4 white knight, d4 white pawn, f3 white bishop, g3 white pawn, a2 white pawn, e2 white pawn, f2 white pawn, h2 white pawn, c1 white rook, d1 white rook, g1 white king

Position after 20.Qb5?!

The ninth game of the match, a 54-move draw, was played on 5 December. As in game 3, Gukesh opened with 1.d4 and Ding responded with 1...Nf6 also seen in game 3. Rather than continuing with 2.Nf3 as seen in game four, Gukesh opted for the more popular 2.c4 and the game developed in a Catalan Opening after 2...e6 and 3.g3. Ding chose a line similar to the Retreat Variation of the Bogo-Indian Defense with 3...Bb4+ and 4...Be7, also employing the Closed Catalan structure with 7...c6 and 8...Nbd7. Gukesh maintained a slight advantage and pleasant position out of the opening until 20.Qb5?! which allowed Ding to equalize and trade off pieces into a draw.

Bogo-Indian Defense, Retreat Variation (ECO E11)
1. d4 Nf6 2. c4 e6 3. g3 Bb4+ 4. Bd2 Be7 5. Bg2 d5 6. Nf3 0-0 7. 0-0 c6 8. Qc2 Nbd7 9. Rd1 b6 10. Bc3 Bb7 11. Nbd2 Qc7 12. Rac1 Rfd8 13. b4 c5 14. bxc5 bxc5 15. Qb2 Nb6 16. Ba5 dxc4 17. Nxc4 Bxf3 18. Bxb6 axb6 19. Bxf3 Ra6 20. Qb5 (diagram) Rxa2 21. Nxb6 Qa7 22. Qb1 Rb8 23. dxc5 Ra6 24. Qb5 Bxc5 25. Qxc5 Qxb6 26. Qxb6 Raxb6 27. Rc6 Rxc6 28. Bxc6 g5 29. Kg2 Rb2 30. Kf1 Kg7 31. h3 h5 32. Ra1 Rc2 33. Bb5 Rc5 34. Bd3 Nd7 35. f4 gxf4 36. gxf4 Rc3 37. Kf2 Nc5 38. Ke3 Nxd3 39. exd3 Rc2 40. Kf3 Rd2 41. Ra3 Kg6 42. Rb3 f6 43. Ra3 Kf5 44. Ra5+ e5 45. fxe5 Rxd3+ 46. Ke2 Rxh3 47. exf6+ Kxf6 48. Kf2 h4 49. Kg2 Rg3+ 50. Kh2 Kg6 51. Rb5 Rg5 52. Rxg5+ Kxg5 53. Kh3 Kf6 54. Kxh4 ½–½

==== Game 10: Ding–Gukesh, ½–½ ====
Ding–Gukesh, game 10

Position: a8 black rook, c8 black bishop, d8 black queen, f8 black rook, g8 black king, a7 black pawn, b7 black pawn, f7 black pawn, g7 black pawn, h7 black pawn, c6 black knight, e6 black pawn, f6 black bishop, g5 white bishop, c4 white bishop, e3 white pawn, f3 white knight, a2 white pawn, b2 white pawn, f2 white pawn, g2 white pawn, h2 white pawn, a1 white rook, d1 white queen, f1 white rook, g1 white king

Position after 13...Bxf6. Ding's 14.Qxd8 followed by 15.Bxf6 was effectively a silent draw offer (Peter Leko).

The tenth game of the match, a 36-move draw, was played on 7 December. An uneventful game, Ding achieved nothing out of the opening. When he further agreed to trade off pieces it became clear that he was happy with a draw. The result was never in question, with commentators opining that if not for the rule that prohibited draw offers before move 40, the players could have agreed to a draw long before the game actually ended.

London System (ECO D02)
1. d4 Nf6 2. Nf3 d5 3. Bf4 e6 4. e3 c5 5. Be2 Bd6 6. dxc5 Bxc5 7. c4 0-0 8. 0-0 Nc6 9. Nc3 dxc4 10. Bxc4 Nh5 11. Bg5 Be7 12. Ne4 Nf6 13. Nxf6+ Bxf6 (diagram) 14. Qxd8 Rxd8 15. Bxf6 gxf6 16. Rfd1 Bd7 17. Rac1 Be8 18. Rxd8 Rxd8 19. Kf1 Kg7 20. a3 f5 21. Ke1 Kf6 22. Be2 Ne7 23. g3 Rc8 24. Rxc8 Nxc8 25. Nd2 Nd6 26. Nc4 Nxc4 27. Bxc4 Bc6 28. f4 b6 29. Kd2 Ke7 30. Kc3 Kd6 31. b4 f6 32. Kd4 h6 33. Bb3 Bb7 34. Bc4 Bc6 35. Bb3 Bb7 36. Bc4 Bc6 ½–½

==== Game 11: Gukesh–Ding, 1–0 ====
Gukesh–Ding, game 11

Position: d8 black rook, e8 black king, h8 black rook, b7 black pawn, e7 black pawn, f7 black pawn, b6 white pawn, c6 black knight, g6 black pawn, h6 black bishop, a5 black pawn, c5 black queen, h5 black pawn, a4 white pawn, c4 white pawn, d4 black pawn, e4 white queen, a3 white knight, d3 white pawn, g3 white pawn, h3 white pawn, f2 white pawn, g2 white bishop, a1 white rook, d1 white rook, g1 white king

Position after 21.Na3. White cannot defend the pawn on b6, but has strong pressure on the a8–h1 diagonal as compensation. If White gets in Qxb7, then the c4-pawn could become a dangerous passed pawn.

The eleventh game of the match, a 29-move win for Gukesh, was played on 8 December. Gukesh confused his preparation, spending an hour deciding whether to play 11.g3, and fell into a dubious position with 15.Rd1, but Ding played 15...g6 which failed to capitalize. A highly complicated game resulted. On the 18th move, the players were already in time trouble, both with less than 22 minutes on the clock, and both played major inaccuracies with 26...e6 and 28.Rdb1. The position was still complicated when Ding blundered his knight with 28...Qc8??, missing that his pawn on b7 was pinned (instead, 28...Nb4 would keep the game going). Ding resigned after 29.Qxc6! from Gukesh, ending the game abruptly and putting Gukesh in the lead for the first time.

Réti Opening, Reversed Blumenfeld Gambit (ECO A09)
1. Nf3 d5 2. c4 d4 3. b4 c5 4. e3 Nf6 5. a3 Bg4 6. exd4 cxd4 7. h3 Bxf3 8. Qxf3 Qc7 9. d3 a5 10. b5 Nbd7 11. g3 Nc5 12. Bg2 Nfd7 13. 0-0 Ne5 14. Qf4 Rd8 15. Rd1 g6 16. a4 h5 17. b6 Qd6 18. Ba3 Bh6 19. Bxc5 Qxc5 20. Qe4 Nc6 21. Na3 (diagram) Rd7 22. Nc2 Qxb6 23. Rab1 Qc7 24. Rb5 0-0 25. Na1 Rb8 26. Nb3 e6 27. Nc5 Re7 28. Rdb1 Qc8 29. Qxc6 1–0

==== Game 12: Ding–Gukesh, 1–0 ====
Ding–Gukesh, game 12

Position: b8 black rook, d8 black queen, e8 black rook, g8 black king, b7 black pawn, c7 black pawn, d7 black knight, e7 black bishop, f7 black pawn, g7 black pawn, c6 black knight, h6 black pawn, a5 black pawn, b5 white knight, e5 black pawn, f5 black bishop, c4 white pawn, a3 white pawn, d3 white pawn, e3 white bishop, f3 white knight, g3 white pawn, h3 white pawn, b2 white pawn, d2 white queen, f2 white pawn, g2 white bishop, h2 white king, d1 white rook, e1 white rook

Position after 17.Qd2. Having played 16...Nd7 to target Ding's backward pawn on d3 with 17...Nc5, Gukesh instead played 17...Bg6?! which allowed Ding to gain a sizable advantage with 18.d4!. Gukesh realized too late that his intended 18...exd4? loses to 19.Bf4! with significant challenges for Black.

Position: b8 black rook, d8 black queen, e8 black rook, g8 black king, b7 black pawn, c7 black pawn, f7 black pawn, g7 black pawn, b6 black knight, c6 black knight, f6 black bishop, g6 black bishop, h6 black pawn, b5 white knight, a4 black pawn, c4 white pawn, d4 white pawn, e4 black pawn, a3 white pawn, e3 white bishop, g3 white pawn, h3 white pawn, b2 white pawn, c2 white queen, e2 white knight, f2 white pawn, g2 white bishop, h2 white king, d1 white rook, e1 white rook

Position after 22.Ne2. In a bad position, Gukesh has one last chance to seek counterplay with 22...Na5 threatening ...Nb3 or taking on c4. Kibitzing GM Magnus Carlsen opined that Black absolutely has to go for it even if it objectively does not save the game, since the game continuation 22...Bg5 23.Nf4 Bxf4 24.Bxf4 (hitting the c7-pawn) is equivalent to resigning.

The twelfth game of the match, a 39-move win for Ding, was played on 9 December. In one of his best-ever games, Ding played with computer-like accuracy to "roll over" (Hikaru Nakamura) his opponent. Opting for the English opening, the game followed a previous game played in 2019 between Ding's seconds Ni Hua and Richárd Rapport up until move 7. Gukesh made some hesitant moves – 13...Rb8 apparently intended ...Nd4, which was not played; 16...Nd7 apparently intended ...Nc5, which was also not played – and Ding's advantage grew into a large one. After Gukesh's 17th move, chess engine Leela Chess Zero gave Ding's winning chances as having increased from 38.2% to 51.9%. Ding missed 26.Na7 to win the exchange, but his 26.d5 was also winning. Gukesh struggled on until move 39 as Ding finished in style with the rook sacrifice 39.Rxg7+, forcing Gukesh to resign due to the coming pawn promotion with mate soon to follow.

Bryan Armen Graham of The Guardian described Gukesh as being "confounded in a state of middlegame zugzwang". Both former world champion Magnus Carlsen and Hikaru Nakamura were critical of Gukesh's opening choice after the game, since Ding's opening choice was fairly predictable, yet Ding still got a clear advantage and was able to play for a win with no risk of losing.

English Opening, Neo-Catalan (ECO A13)
1. c4 e6 2. g3 d5 3. Bg2 Nf6 4. Nf3 d4 5. 0-0 Nc6 6. e3 Be7 7. d3 dxe3 8. Bxe3 e5 9. Nc3 0-0 10. Re1 h6 11. a3 a5 12. h3 Be6 13. Kh2 Rb8 14. Qc2 Re8 15. Nb5 Bf5 16. Rad1 Nd7 17. Qd2 (first diagram) Bg6 18. d4 e4 19. Ng1 Nb6 20. Qc3 Bf6 21. Qc2 a4 22. Ne2 (second diagram) Bg5 23. Nf4 Bxf4 24. Bxf4 Rc8 25. Qc3 Nb8 26. d5 Qd7 27. d6 c5 28. Nc7 Rf8 29. Bxe4 Nc6 30. Bg2 Rcd8 31. Nd5 Nxd5 32. cxd5 Nb8 33. Qxc5 Rc8 34. Qd4 Na6 35. Re7 Qb5 36. d7 Rc4 37. Qe3 Rc2 38. Bd6 f6 39. Rxg7+ 1–0

==== Game 13: Gukesh–Ding, ½–½ ====
Gukesh–Ding, game 13

Position: b8 black rook, c8 black bishop, f8 black rook, g8 black king, a7 black pawn, e7 black knight, g7 black pawn, h7 black pawn, e6 black pawn, g6 black queen, b5 black pawn, c4 black pawn, d4 white pawn, f4 white bishop, a3 white pawn, c3 white knight, f3 white pawn, b2 white pawn, e2 white queen, g2 white pawn, h2 white pawn, d1 white rook, f1 white rook, g1 white king

Position after 22.Bf4. White's bishop targets the weak squares on d6 and c7, exploiting the fact that 22...Rxf4? would lose an exchange to 23.Qe5.

Game 13, a hard-fought draw in 69 moves, was played on 11 December 2024. Gukesh surprised Ding out of the opening with 7.a3 and 8.Be3, putting Ding under pressure. With 17.Qf3!? (which Magnus Carlsen called a move he would only consider if he were very inspired or in very bad shape) he offered the d4-pawn, but Ding believed his opponent and played 17...Qe8?!, a significant concession since the queen can no longer go to its best square (f6). Gukesh grew his advantage with 22.Bf4!, infiltrating on the weak d6- and c7-squares, but 25.Bxe7?! was a little hasty. This move forces an advantageous position, but 25.Rfe1 would have been even better. Gukesh briefly had a winning advantage when Ding misstepped with 30...Qf7? (it was necessary to trade queen for two rooks with 30...Qxe1!), but his 31.Ne4? allowed Black key defensive resources that Gukesh had missed (exchanging rooks first with 31.Rxe8+! Qxe8 32.Ne4 would have forced the win). Despite having only 8 minutes for 10 more moves, Ding found the only moves 31...Rf8! and 32...Rc7! to draw the game.

French Defense, Steinitz Variation (ECO C11)
1. e4 e6 2. d4 d5 3. Nc3 Nf6 4. e5 Nfd7 5. Nce2 c5 6. c3 Nc6 7. a3 Be7 8. Be3 Nb6 9. Nf4 cxd4 10. cxd4 Nc4 11. Bxc4 dxc4 12. Nge2 b5 13. 0-0 0-0 14. Nc3 Rb8 15. Nh5 f5 16. exf6 Bxf6 17. Qf3 Qe8 18. Nxf6+ Rxf6 19. Qe2 Qg6 20. f3 Rf8 21. Rad1 Ne7 22. Bf4 (diagram) Rb6 23. Bc7 Rb7 24. Bd6 Re8 25. Bxe7 Rexe7 26. Qe5 a6 27. d5 exd5 28. Qxd5+ Qe6 29. Qc5 Re8 30. Rde1 Qf7 31. Ne4 Rf8 32. Nd6 Rc7 33. Qe5 Qf6 34. Qd5+ Kh8 35. Re5 Re7 36. Rfe1 Rxe5 37. Rxe5 h6 38. Qc5 Bd7 39. Ne4 Qf4 40. Re7 Bf5 41. Qd4 Rg8 42. h3 Qc1+ 43. Kf2 Bxe4 44. Rxe4 c3 45. bxc3 Qxa3 46. Kg3 Qb3 47. Re7 a5 48. Rb7 Qc4 49. Qe5 Qc6 50. Qxb5 Qxc3 51. Ra7 Qe1+ 52. Kh2 Qb4 53. Qxb4 axb4 54. Rb7 Ra8 55. Rxb4 Ra2 56. Kg3 Kh7 57. Rb5 Kg6 58. f4 Kf6 59. Kf3 Rc2 60. g3 Rc3+ 61. Kg4 Ra3 62. h4 Rc3 63. Rb6+ Kf7 64. f5 h5+ 65. Kf4 Rc4+ 66. Kf3 Rc3+ 67. Kf4 Rc4+ 68. Kf3 Rc3+ 69. Kf4 ½–½

==== Game 14: Ding–Gukesh, 0–1 ====
Ding–Gukesh, game 14

Position: a8 black rook, d8 black queen, f8 black rook, g8 black king, f7 black pawn, g7 black pawn, h7 black pawn, a6 black pawn, c6 black knight, e6 black bishop, b5 black pawn, d5 white knight, e5 black pawn, c4 white pawn, d4 black bishop, b3 white pawn, g3 white pawn, a2 white pawn, b2 white bishop, d2 white queen, f2 white pawn, g2 white bishop, h2 white pawn, a1 white rook, f1 white rook, g1 white king

Position after 18...b5. In a slightly superior position, Ding inexplicably (Rafael Leitão) decides to play 19.cxb5 and 20.Nf4, forcing piece exchanges and liquidating towards a draw. Kibitzing GMs Hikaru Nakamura and Magnus Carlsen opined that this was either a sign of a player who was not very confident, or was in a tournament situation where a draw is sufficient.

Position: a8 white bishop, e6 black bishop, e5 black king, f5 black pawn, g4 black pawn, g3 white pawn, b2 black rook, f2 white rook, g1 white king

Position after Ding's blunder: 55.Rf4–f2??

Game 14, a 58-move win for Gukesh, was played on 12 December 2024. Gukesh came up with the game's first surprise by playing the rare move 6...Nge7!?. He then played for a win with 13...Bb6?!, a move GM Magnus Carlsen criticized as "ambition without ammunition" since although it avoided a draw, it led to a position in which only Ding could be better. Ding failed to capitalize, however, and when he played 19.cxb5?! he indicated a desire to liquidate towards a draw. Ding's plan led to a pawn-down endgame which was a theoretical draw, although Black could try to win. After over 20 moves of maneuvering, Ding made a surprise blunder, offering a rook trade (55.Rf2??) at a time when his bishop was stuck on a corner square, allowing Gukesh to force a winning 2 pawns vs. 1 pawn endgame.

The win made Gukesh the youngest undisputed World Chess Champion; only Ruslan Ponomariov, the winner of the FIDE World Chess Championship 2002, a knock-out style tournament held when there was a divided world chess championship, was younger when he won the title.

King's Indian Attack, French, Reversed Grünfeld Variation (ECO A08)
1. Nf3 d5 2. g3 c5 3. Bg2 Nc6 4. d4 e6 5. 0-0 cxd4 6. Nxd4 Nge7 7. c4 Nxd4 8. Qxd4 Nc6 9. Qd1 d4 10. e3 Bc5 11. exd4 Bxd4 12. Nc3 0-0 13. Nb5 Bb6 14. b3 a6 15. Nc3 Bd4 16. Bb2 e5 17. Qd2 Be6 18. Nd5 b5 19. cxb5 axb5 20. Nf4 exf4 21. Bxc6 Bxb2 22. Qxb2 Rb8 23. Rfd1 Qb6 24. Bf3 fxg3 25. hxg3 b4 26. a4 bxa3 27. Rxa3 g6 28. Qd4 Qb5 29. b4 Qxb4 30. Qxb4 Rxb4 31. Ra8 Rxa8 32. Bxa8 g5 33. Bd5 Bf5 34. Rc1 Kg7 35. Rc7 Bg6 36. Rc4 Rb1+ 37. Kg2 Re1 38. Rb4 h5 39. Ra4 Re5 40. Bf3 Kh6 41. Kg1 Re6 42. Rc4 g4 43. Bd5 Rd6 44. Bb7 Kg5 45. f3 f5 46. fxg4 hxg4 47. Rb4 Bf7 48. Kf2 Rd2+ 49. Kg1 Kf6 50. Rb6+ Kg5 51. Rb4 Be6 52. Ra4 Rb2 53. Ba8 Kf6 54. Rf4 Ke5 55. Rf2 (diagram) Rxf2 56. Kxf2 Bd5 57. Bxd5 Kxd5 58. Ke3 Ke5 0–1

== Aftermath ==
Per regulation, Gukesh won $1,350,000 while Ding took home $1,150,000. Despite winning the match, Gukesh lost 6.2 Elo rating points and remained fifth on the FIDE rating list, while Ding gained 6.2 points and moved to seventeenth.

Gukesh paid tribute to his opponent after the match, commending Ding for defending several very difficult positions in the match:

In the games where he was almost going to give up, where the position was completely losing for him, he kept finding resources, he kept fighting, and then once I took the lead he played an amazing game to fight back.… Any normal human being would have just given up at that point, but then he came the next day and he played a great game. He completely destroyed me that game, and it was really inspiring to see that despite how the odds are against him, he kept fighting. He kept coming to the board and giving it his all. He’s a real inspiration for me!

Gukesh acknowledged that although he had become world champion, he is not the best player in the world, which is still Magnus Carlsen; (Note: Carlsen had declined to defend his title in 2023) however, this only motivates him to try to catch Carlsen. For his part, Carlsen acknowledged that Gukesh has time and room to improve, and might even be the one to knock him off the top spot. Gukesh's win turned him into an instant celebrity in his home country of India, with a massive crowd greeting him on his return.

For Ding, the match exceeded expectations because he played strong chess following a period of poor form. Ding's second Richárd Rapport even opined that Ding had overall played better than his opponent, saying Ding "completely outplayed" Gukesh in both his wins. Chess.com's post-match analysis stated that whilst Ding had advantageous positions in all three of his losses, his apparent lack of self-belief and underestimation of his position meant he was unable to press home the advantage. Ding said after the match that he would continue to play chess, albeit with more focus on rapid and blitz. He was non-committal about fighting for another shot at the World Championship: there was no automatic berth for the loser of the match in the Candidates Tournament 2026, so he would have had to play in the World Cup or the FIDE circuit, which could require too many tournaments. The next world championship will be held in 2026.
