= Asian Chess Federation =

Continental governing body of chess in Asia

- Abbreviation: ACF
- Headquarters: Al-Ain, United Arab Emirates
- Members: 52 national federations
- President: (United Arab Emirates) Sultan bin Khalifa Al Nahyan
- Website: www.asianchess.com

The Asian Chess Federation is the continental governing body of the sport of chess in Asia. The ACF annually organized the Asian Chess Championship.

In 2023 it accepted the Chess Federation of Russia which left the European Chess Union.

== Member Federations ==
Country	Zone	National federation	#GM	#FIDE	National championship
Afghanistan	3.4	Afghan National Chess Federation	0	197	Afghan Chess Championship
Australia	3.6	Australian Chess Federation	8	2001	Australian Chess Championship
Bahrain	3.1	Bahrain Mind Sports Association	0	53	Bahraini Chess Championship
Bangladesh	3.2	Bangladesh Chess Federation	5	1322	Bangladeshi Chess Championship
Bhutan	3.2	Bhutan Chess Federation	0	7	Bhutan National Premier Chess Championship
Brunei	3.3	Brunei Chess Federation	0	79	Brunei Chess Championship
Cambodia	3.3	Cambodian Chess Federation	0	2	Cambodian Chess Championship
China	3.5	Chinese Chess Association	48	1445	Chinese Chess Championship
Chinese Taipei	3.3	Chinese Taipei Chess Association	0	120	Taiwanese Chess Championship
Fiji	3.6	Fiji Chess Federation	0	43	Fijian Chess Championship
Guam	3.6	Guam Chess Federation	0	28	
Hong Kong	3.3	Hong Kong Chess Federation	0	258	Hong Kong Chess Championship
India	3.7	All India Chess Federation	98	30,609	Indian Chess Championship
Indonesia	3.3	Persatuan Catur Seluruh Indonesia	3	808	Indonesian Chess Championship
Iran	3.1	Chess Fed. of Islamic Rep. of Iran	15	9502	Iranian Chess Championship
Iraq	3.1	Iraqi Chess Federation	0	679	Iraqi Chess Championship
Japan	3.3	Japan Chess Federation	0	206	Japanese Chess Championship
Jordan	3.1	Royal Jordanian Chess Federation	0	495	Jordanian Chess Championship
Kazakhstan	3.4	Kazakhstan Chess Federation	14	2162	Kazakhstani Chess Championship
Kuwait	3.1	Kuwait Chess Federation	0	111	Kuwaiti Chess Championship
Kyrgyzstan	3.4	Chess Federation of the Kyrgyz Republic	0	319	Kyrgyzstani Chess Championship
Laos	3.3	Lao Chess Federation	0	16	Laotian Chess Championship
Lebanon	3.1	Federation Libanaise des Echecs	0	214	Lebanese Chess Championship
Macau	3.3	Grupo de Xadrez de Macau	0	39	
Malaysia	3.3	Malaysian Chess Federation	0	1573	Malaysian Chess Championship
Maldives	3.2	Maldives Chess Federation	0	34	Maldivian Chess Championship
Mongolia	3.3	Mongolian Chess Federation	4	530	Mongolian Chess Championship
Myanmar	3.3	Myanmar Chess Federation	0	647	Myanmar Chess Championship
Nauru	3.6	Nauru Chess Federation	0	8	Nauruan Chess Championship
Nepal	3.2	Nepal Chess Association	0	724	Nepalese Chess Championship
New Zealand	3.6	New Zealand Chess Federation	1	446	New Zealand Chess Championship
Oman	3.1	Oman Chess Committee	0	82	Omani Chess Championship
Pakistan	3.2	Chess Federation of Pakistan	0	120	Pakistani Chess Championship
Palau	3.6	Palau Chess Federation	0	112	Palauan Chess Championship
Palestine	3.1	Palestine Chess Federation	0	183	Palestinian Chess Championship
Papua New Guinea	3.6	Papua New Guinea Chess Federation	0	10	Papua New Guinean Chess Championship
Philippines	3.3	National Chess Federation of the Philippines	14	2619	Philippine Chess Championship
Qatar	3.1	Qatar Chess Association	3	123	Qatari Chess Championship
Russia	3.8	Chess Federation of Russia	260	59,294	Russian Chess Championship
Saudi Arabia	3.1	Saudi Chess Association	0	993	Saudi Arabian Chess Championship
Singapore	3.3	Singapore Chess Federation	3	2377	Singaporean Chess Championship
Solomon Islands	3.6	Solomon Islands Chess Federation	0	35	Solomon Island Chess Championship
South Korea	3.3	Korea Chess Federation	1	752	South Korean Chess Championship
Sri Lanka	3.2	Chess Federation of Sri Lanka	0	8993	Sri Lankan Chess Championship
Syria	3.1	Syrian Arab Chess Federation	0	801	Syrian Chess Championship
Tajikistan	3.4	Federazijai Shakhmati Tajikistan	1	166	Tajikistani Chess Championship
Thailand	3.3	Thailand Chess Association	0	704	Thai Chess Championship
Timor-Leste	3.3	Federação Xadrez de Timor-Leste	0	58	Timorese Chess Championship
Turkmenistan	3.4	Turkmenistan Chess Federation	5	410	Turkmen Chess Championship
United Arab Emirates	3.1	UAE Chess Federation	2	1949	Emirati Chess Championship
Uzbekistan	3.4	Chess Federation of Uzbekistan	12	1073	Uzbekistani Chess Championship
Vietnam	3.3	Vietnam Chess Federation	9	1855	Vietnamese Chess Championship
Yemen	3.1	Yemen Chess Association	0	280	Yemeni Chess Championship

== Tournaments ==
- Asian Chess Championship
- Asian Youth Chess Championship
