= Helen Scott =

Helen Scott may refer to:

- Helen Scott (actress), Australian actress
- Helen Scott (cyclist) (born 1990), British sprint cyclist
- Helen Grace Scott (1915–1987), alleged spy, collaborator with François Truffaut
- Helen Hope Montgomery Scott (1904–1995), American socialite and philanthropist
- Helen Milligan (born 1962), Scottish New Zealand chess player, née Helen Scott
- Helen Scott (singer) in The Three Degrees
- Helen Scott (murder victim) (died 1977) in World's End Murders

== See also ==
- Ellen Scott (disambiguation)
