= Gong Qianyun =

Chinese-Singaporean chess player (born 1985)

Personal information
- Born: 11 March 1985 (age 41) Lechang, Shaoguan, Guangdong, China
- Spouse: Tay Shi Hao (m. 2012)

Chess career
- Country: China (until 2014); Singapore (since 2014)
- Title: Woman Grandmaster (2018)
- Peak rating: 2381 (February 2019)

Gong Qianyun (Chinese: 龚倩云; born 11 March 1985) is a Singaporean chess player and holds the title of Woman Grandmaster (WGM).

== Chess career ==
Since Gong was seven year old, she started training in a chess academy in Guangdong, China.

=== 2001 to 2009 ===
Gong finished fourth in the 2001 Women's Chinese Chess Championship.

Gong played on board four on the Chinese women's team — the only women's team present — at the World Team Chess Championship held in Beersheba, Israel in 2005. The following year, she won the Women's World University Chess Championship in Lagos, Nigeria with a score of 7/9 points, contributing to China's team gold medal.

After a series of defeat, Gong left the Chinese teams in 2007 and moved to Hong Kong where she taught chess there.

=== 2009 to present ===
In 2009, Gong moved to Singapore to work as a chess coach.

She won the Singaporean women's championships of 2012, 2015, 2016, 2017 and 2018.

In 2014, Gong transferred to the Singapore Chess Federation and started to represent Singapore. In the same year, she played for the Singaporean team on board three in the open section of the 41st Chess Olympiad and earned a norm for the title Woman Grandmaster thanks to a performance rating of 2412.

In June 2018, Gong earned her final WGM norm at the QCD Prof Lim Kok Ann Invitational tournament and was awarded the title of Woman Grandmaster by FIDE. In December, she tied with Padmini Rout for first place in the Asian Women's Continental Championship in Makati, Philippines, scoring 7/9 points. Gong took the silver medal on tiebreak score.

In 2019, Gong took part in 2019 SEA Games and won the women's rapid chess, beating nine other competitors to win Singapore's first gold medal in chess. The gold was also Singapore's 900th gold medal of the SEA Games.

In 2024, Gong won the Gold medal in the Women's category of 2023-24 Commonwealth Chess Championship held at Malacca, Malaysia.

Gong plays for Qingdao Yucai chess club in the China Chess League (CCL).

== Personal life ==
In 2012, Gong married her husband Tay Shi Hao. She also became a Singaporean citizen in the same year. The couple has two children.
