= Chess Federation of Pakistan =

Administrative body for chess in Pakistan

- چس فیڈریشن آف پاکستان
- Sport: Chess
- Jurisdiction: National
- Abbreviation: CFP
- Founded: 1957; 69 years ago
- Affiliation: FIDE
- Affiliation date: 1973
- Regional affiliation: Asian Chess Federation; Commonwealth Chess Association
- President: Mr. Zeeshan Naqvi
- Vice president: Anwar Saleem Kasi)

Official website
- www.chessfederationofpakistan.com
- (Pakistan)

The Chess Federation of Pakistan is national governing body to promote and develop chess in Pakistan. It was established in 1957, and joined FIDE in 1973.

Mr. Zeeshan Naqvi is the current president of the federation, having been elected unanimously in June 2026.

It organizes the Pakistani Chess Championship and other local tournaments.

== Affiliations ==
The Chess Federation of Pakistan is affiliated with:

- FIDE
- Asian Chess Federation
- Commonwealth Chess Association
- Pakistan Sports Board

== Affiliated associations ==
The following bodies are associated with the CFP:

- Azad Kashmir Chess Association
- Balochistan Chess Association
- Gilgit Baltistan Chess Association
- Islamabad Chess Association
- Khyber Pakhtunkhwa Chess Association
- Punjab Chess Association
- Sindh Chess Association
