= Malaysian Chess Championship =

The Malaysian Chess Championship is organized by the Malaysian Chess Federation (MCF; Malay: Persekutuan Catur Malaysia). Known as the National Closed Chess Championship prior to 2016, the first edition was held in 1974. A separate Malaysian Women's Chess Championship has also been held annually since 1990. FIDE Master Christi Hon has won the national title a record five times, while Woman International Master Siti Zulaikha Foudzi has won the women's title a record eight times. It has occurred twice that a pair of siblings have won the national and the women's titles in the same year: Kamal Ariffin Wahiddudin and Nurul Huda Wahiduddin in 1991, and Zarul Shazwan Zullkafli and Nur Shazwani Zullkafli in 2007.

== National championship winners ==
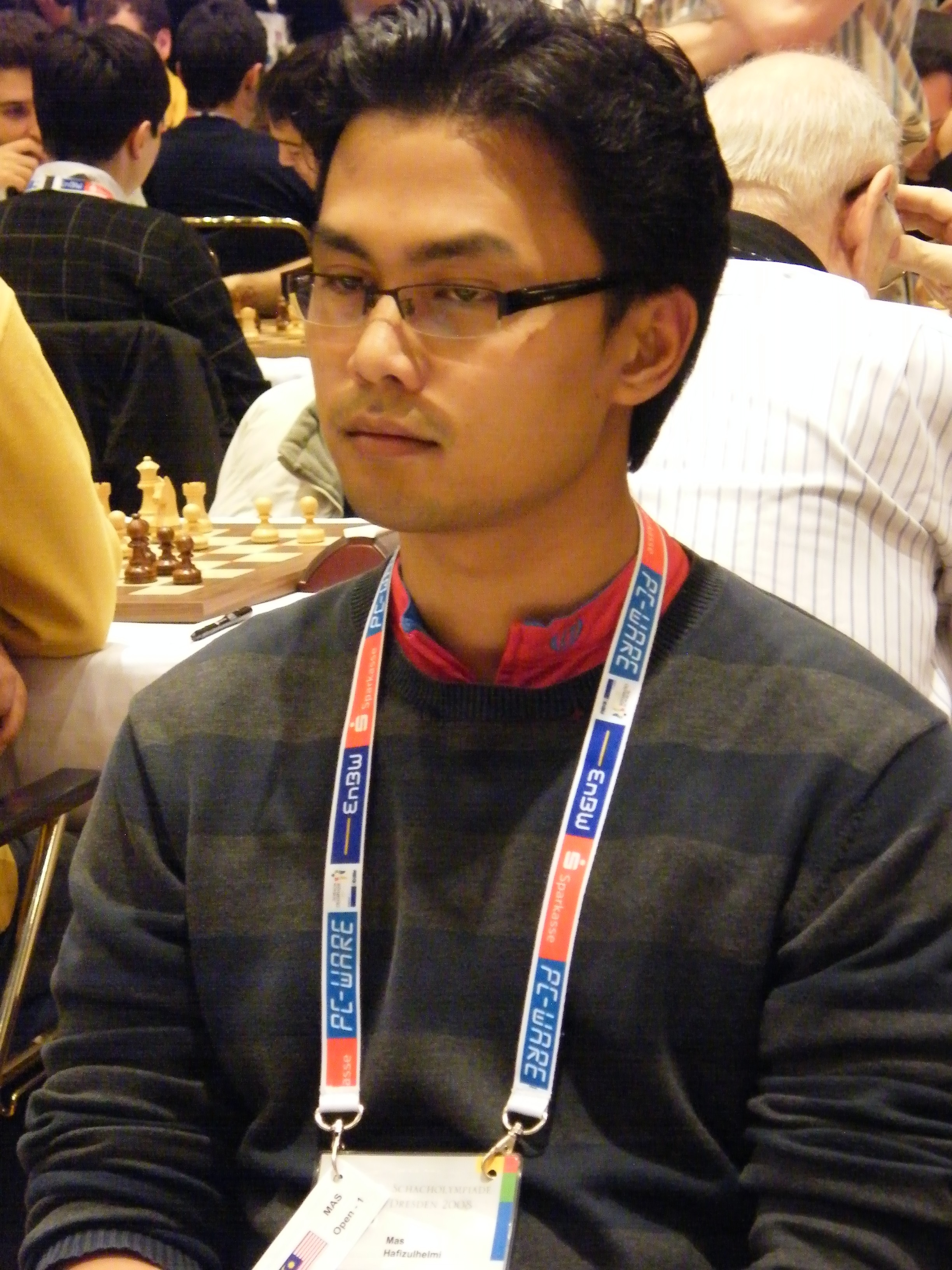
Mas Hafizulhelmi, Malaysian champion in 1994 and 1995

Year	Champion
1974	Choo Min Wang
1975	Chan Swee Loon
1976	Goh Yoon Wah
1977	Tan Bian Huat
1978	Christi Hon
1979	Tay Chong Thai
1980	Jimmy Liew
1981	Christi Hon
1982	Goh Yoon Wah
1983	Christi Hon
1984	Jimmy Liew
1985	Peter Long, Francis Chin
1986	Peter Long, Francis Chin
1987	Christi Hon, Lee Soi Hock
1988	Kamal Abdullah
1989	Kamal Abdullah
1990	Ng Ek Leong
1991	Kamal Ariffin Wahiddudin
1992	Mok Tze Meng
1993	Yeoh Chin Seng
1994	Mas Hafizulhelmi
1995	Mas Hafizulhelmi
1996	Lim Yee Weng
1997	Lim Yee Weng
1998	Ng Ee Vern
1999	Jonathan Chuah
2000	Ng Tze Han
2001	Lim Chuin Hoong (Ronnie Lim)
2002	Wong Zi Jing
2003	Nicholas Chan
2004	Nicholas Chan
2005	Marcus Chan
2006	Jonathan Chuah
2007	Zarul Shazwan Zullkafli
2008	Lee Kim Han (Edward Lee)
2009	Evan Timothy Capel
2010	Tan Khai Boon
2011	Lim Zhuo Ren
2012	Roshan Ajit Singh
2013	Aron Teh
2014	Fong Yit San
2015	Yeoh Li Tian
2016	Yeoh Li Tian
2017	Wong Yinn Long
2018	Fong Yit San
2019	Kamal Abdullah
2022	Tan Jun Ying
2023	Lim Zhuo Ren
2024	Wong Jianwen
2025	Kavin Mohan
2026	Chow Yi Chen

== Women's championship winners ==
Year	Champion
1990	Audrey Wong
1991	Nurul Huda Wahiduddin
1992	Nurul Huda Wahiduddin
1993	Eliza Hanum Ibrahim
1994	Roslina Marmono
1995	Khairunnisa Wahiduddin
1996	Eliza Hanum Ibrahim
1997	Eliza Hanim Ibrahim
1998	Eliza Hanum Ibrahim
1999	Siti Zulaikha Foudzi
2000	Siti Zulaikha Foudzi
2001	Siti Zulaikha Foudzi
2002	Siti Zulaikha Foudzi
2003	Siti Zulaikha Foudzi
2004	Siti Zulaikha Foudzi
2005	Siti Zulaikha Foudzi
2006	Siti Zulaikha Foudzi
2007	Nur Shazwani Zullkafli
2008	Alia Anin Azwa Bakri
2009	Tan Li Ting
2010	Fong Mi Yen
2011	Nur Nabila Azman Hisham
2012	Nur Najiha Azman Hisham
2013	Nur Nabila Azman Hisham
2014	Renitha Narayanan
2015	Nur Nabila Azman Hisham
2016	Nur Nabila Azman Hisham
2017	Nur Nabila Azman Hisham
2018	Tan Li Ting
2019	Puteri Munajjah Az-Zahraa Azhar
2022	Siti Zulaikha Foudzi
2023	Ainul Mardhiah Mohd Afif
2024	Puteri Munajjah Az-Zahraa Azhar
2025	Puteri Munajjah Az-Zahraa Azhar

== Precursors ==
=== Malayan championship ===
Prior to the formation of Malaysia, a Malayan Chess Championship was organized by the Malayan Chess Federation which was founded in 1949. It was usually hosted in Singapore and was open to players outside the Federation of Malaya. The first winner, Johannes Fernhout, was a Dutchman from Java.

=== Malayan championship winners ===
Year	Location	Champion
1949	Penang	Johannes Fernhout
1950	Singapore	Pat Aherne
1951	Singapore	J. C. Hickey
1952	Singapore	G. H. Brownbill
1953	Singapore	Tay Kheng Hong
1954	Singapore	Richard Lim
1955	Kuala Lumpur	David B. Pritchard
1956	Singapore	M. Davis
1957	Singapore	J. C. Hickey
1958	Singapore	J. C. Hickey
1959	Singapore	J. C. Hickey
1960	Singapore	R. E. Fontana
1961	Kuala Lumpur	Tan Lian Ann
1962	Singapore	Tan Lian Ann
1963	Singapore	Tan Lian Seng

=== Malaysian championships prior to 1974 ===
In April 1965, the Singapore Chess Federation and the Chess Association of Malaya hosted "the first Malaysian chess championship" in Singapore, which was open to "people in all Malaysian States." The winner was Tan Lian Ann of Singapore. Afterwards, national championships in Malaysia were held irregularly due to a lack of organizers. Before the Malaysian Chess Federation replaced the Chess Association of Malaya, the last national tournament took place in 1972–1973 in Kuala Lumpur and was won by Chan Mun Fye.
