= Asian Senior Chess Championship =

Annual chess tournament

The Asian Senior Chess Championship is an annual chess tournament organised by the Asian Chess Federation (ACF). The participants are aged 50 years and over. The inaugural edition was held in 2010 in Lebanon.

== List of winners ==
#	Year	Location	Sources	Winner	Women's winner
1	2010	Beirut		Khosro Harandi (IRI)	
2	2011	Bentota		Massoud Amir Sawadkuhi (IRI)	
3	2012	Parramatta		Anthonie Luchtmeijer (AUS)	Shirchin Battsengel (MGL)
4	Jan–Feb; 2014	Amman		Bakr Hafez (JOR)	
5	Dec 2014	Waskaduwa, Kalutara		Baimurzin Aitkazy (KAZ) (50+); Massoud Amir Sawadkuhi (IRI) (65+)	
6	2015	Lar		Mahmood Lodhi (PAK) (50+); Wazeer Ahmad Khan (IND) (65+)	Helen Milligan (NZL) (50+); Bakhyt Badamshina (KAZ) (65+)
7	2016	Mandalay		Myint Han (MYA) (50+); Wazeer Ahmad Khan (IND) (65+)	Helen Milligan (NZL)
8	2017	Auckland		Mahmood Lodhi (PAK) (50+); Eugenio Torre (PHI) (65+)	Helen Milligan (NZL)
9	2018	Tagaytay		Chito Garma (PHI) (50+); Eugenio Torre (PHI) (65+)	Helen Milligan (NZL)
10	2019	Almaty		Talal Alzaim (SYR) (50+); Tolegen Nukin (KAZ) (65+)	Yelena Ankudinova (KAZ) (50+); Nadezhda Iskichekova (KAZ) (65+)
–	2020	not held (Note: The 2020 edition was cancelled due to the COVID-19 pandemic. Instead, an online tournament was held at rapid time controls. The winners in the open 50+ and 65+ sections were Rogelio Antonio Jr. and Marat Primbetov respectively. Liang Zhihua won the 50+ women's section.)			
11	2021	Damascus		Hussein al-Ali (IRQ) (50+); Tilek Takyrbashev (KGZ) (65+)	
12	2022	Auckland		Gary Lane (AUS) (50+); Efren Bagamasbad (PHI) (65+)	Helen Milligan (NZL) (50+); Vivian Smith (NZL) (65+)
13	2023	Tagaytay		Chito Garma (PHI) (50+); Efren Bagamasbad (PHI) (65+)	Inna Matveyeva-Poprukailo (KAZ) (50+); Irina Bulanova (KAZ) (65+)
14	2024	Ulaanbaatar		Bazar Khatanbaatar (MGL) (50+); Evgenij Kalegin (RUS) (65+)	Alfiya Turebayeva (KAZ) (50+); Galina Strutinskaya (RUS) (65+)
15	2025	Erbil		Aziz Umarbekov (UZB) (50+); Marat Primbetov (KAZ) (65+)	Iman Mahdi Ahmed (IRQ) (50+); Galina Strutinskaya (RUS) (65+)
16	2026	Osh		to be determined	to be determined

== See also ==
- World Senior Chess Championship
- European Senior Chess Championship
- Asian Chess Championship
