= Mohd Kamal Abdullah =

Malaysian chess player (born 1970)

Personal information
- Born: Mohamad Kamal bin Abdullah; 1970 (age 55–56)

Chess career
- Country: Malaysia
- Title: Candidate Master (2016)
- Peak rating: 2235 (July 1990)

Mohd Kamal Abdullah (Jawi: محمد كمال عبدالله; born 1970) is a Malaysian chess Candidate Master (CM) and a three-time Malaysian Chess Champion.

== Chess career ==
During his early years in chess, Abdullah grew up idolizing the former World Chess Champion Garry Kasparov as well as local two-time chess champion and Malaysia's first International Master (IM) Jimmy Liew.

"Who were my inspiration in chess? During the time when i first started, the Karpov-Kasparov names were going on big, so Kasparov was the main hero. And of course in reading newspapers like The Malay Mail and Utusan Melayu i kept on reading on this player called Jimmy Liew and I've always wanted to see him, he was my local hero".

— Mohd Kamal Abdullah

Abdullah won the Malaysian Chess Championship three times, the first and second being in two consecutive years which happened in 1988 and 1989. After a long hiatus in chess, Abdullah secured his third championship win after three decades which he won the title in 2019. Abdullah has also represented Malaysia in four Chess Olympiads, the latest being in 2016 as a replacement for IM Mas Hafizulhelmi.
