= Chan Peng Kong =

Singaporean chess player (born 1956)

Personal information
- Born: May 15, 1956 (age 70)

Chess career
- Country: Singapore
- Title: International Master (2002)
- Peak rating: 2405 (January 2001)

Chan Peng Kong (born 15 May 1956) is a Singaporean chess player. He was awarded the International Master (IM) title by FIDE in 2002. He won the national Singaporean Chess Championship in 1999 on tie-break score. Chan represented Singapore eight times in the Chess Olympiad (1982, 1984, 1986, 1990, 2000, 2002, 2004, 2006, 2008, 2010). He won the Seniors 50+ section of the ASEAN+ Age Group Chess Championships in 2007, 2012 and 2013.
