= Mahmood Lodhi =

Pakistani chess player

Personal information
- Born: August 8, 1961 (age 64) Gujranwala, West Pakistan

Chess career
- Country: Pakistan
- Title: International Master (1987)
- FIDE rating: 2150 (April 2024)
- Peak rating: 2438 (July 2000)

Mahmood Lodhi (born 1961) is a Pakistani chess player. He was awarded the title International Master by FIDE in 1987 and he has one Grandmaster Norm. Being most successful in national chess championship of his country, he has won the championship with a record of 16 times. Lodhi won the Asian Senior Chess Championship in the 50+ category in 2015 and 2017.
