= Singapore Chess Championship =

The Singapore Chess Championship is the annual individual national chess championship of Singapore organised by the Singapore Chess Federation. The event also features a Challengers section, which is a FIDE-rated tournament for amateur chess players. In 2015, the Challengers section was named "Singapore Amateur Chess Championship".

== Winners ==
Nr	Year	Men (standard)	Women (standard)	Men (rapid)	Women (rapid)	Men (blitz)	Women (blitz)
1	1949	Lim Kok Ann					
2	1950	P. Aherne					
3	1951	R. W. Borsodi					
4	1952	J. C. Hickey					
5	1953	Tay Kheng Hong					
6	1954	David Pritchard					
7	1955	David Pritchard					
8	1956	Low Seow Meng					
9	1957	J. C. Hickey; Tay Kheng Hong					
10	1958	J. C. Hickey					
11	1959	Tan Lian Ann					
12	1960	Lim Kok Ann					
13	1961	Tan Lian Seng					
14	1962	Tan Lian Ann					
15	1963	Tan Lian Seng					
16	1964	Tan Lian Ann					
17	1965	Tan Lian Ann					
18	1966	Tan Lian Seng					
19	1967	Tan Lian Ann					
20	1968	Lim Kok Ann					
21	1969	Tan Lian Ann					
22	1970	Oey Liang Hien					
23	1971	Pang Kwok Leong					
24	1972	Giam Choo Kwee					
25	1973	Giam Choo Kwee					
26	1974	Pang Kwok Leong					
27	1975	Lim Seng Hoo					
28	1976	Lim Seng Hoo					
29	1977	Lim Seng Hoo					
30	1978	Lim Seng Hoo					
31	1979	Leow Leslie					
32	1980	Tan Lian Ann					
33	1981	Tan Lian Ann					
34	1982	Tan Lian Ann					
35	1983	Tan Lian Ann					
36	1984	Leow Leslie					
37	1985	Wong Meng Leong					
38	1986	Wong Meng Kong					
39	1987	Heng Derrick					
40	1988	Wong Foong Yin					
41	1989	Wong Meng Kong					
42	1990	Wong Meng Kong					
43	1991	Wong Meng Kong					
44	1992	Hsu Li Yang					
45	1993	Hsu Li Yang	Yip Fong Ling				
46	1994	Tan Tzer En	Yip Fong Ling				
47	1995	Terry Toh	Yip Fong Ling				
48	1996	Lau Keng Boon	Hon Christel				
49	1997	Choong Gregory	Yap Cynthia				
50	1998	Chan Mark	Yap Cynthia				
51	1999	Chan Peng Kong					
52	2000	Kek Wei Chuan					
53	2001	Koh Kum Hong					
54	2002	Leong Luke	Liu Yang				
55	2003	Wu Shaobin	Liu Yang				
56	2004	Jason Goh Koon-Jong	Tay Li Jin Jeslin				
57	2005	Wu Shaobin	Sia Xin Yun Suzanna				
58	2006	Goh Weiming	Tay Li Jin Jeslin				
59	2007	Goh Weiming	Khegay Anjela				
60	2008	Goh Weiming	Chan Wei Yi Victoria				
61	2009	Goh Weiming					
62	2010	Chan Yi Ren Daniel					
63	2011	Chan Wei Xuan Timothy	Liu Yang				
64	2012	Goh Weiming	Gong Qianyun				
65	2013	Goh Weiming	Ho En Huei Danielle				
66	2014	Liu Xiangyi					
67	2015	Paciencia Enrique	Gong Qianyun				
68	2016	Tin Jingyao	Gong Qianyun				
69	2017	Tin Jingyao, Goh Weiming	Gong Qianyun				
70	2018	Tin Jingyao	Gong Qianyun				
71	2019	Tin Jingyao	Gong Qianyun				
72	2020	Tin Jingyao	Gong Qianyun				
73	2021	Susilodinata Andrean	Gong Qianyun				
74	2022	Goh Weiming	Gong Qianyun	Lee Qing Aun	?	?	?
75	2023	Tin Jingyao	Gong Qianyun	Goh Weiming	Gong Qianyun	?	Gong Qianyun
76	2024	Tin Jingyao	Gong Qianyun	Goh Weiming	Gong Qianyun	Goh Weiming	Gong Qianyun
77	2025	Tin Jingyao	Gong Qianyun	Zhenyong Jayden Wong	Kun Fang	Yu Zhe Ashton Chia	Gong Qianyun
78	2026	Tin Jingyao	Sreekarthika Velmurugan	?	?	?	?
