= Yeoh Li Tian =

Malaysian chess grandmaster (born 1999)

Yeoh Li Tian 杨理天
- Yeoh Li Tian in 2026

Personal information
- Born: October 16, 1999 (age 26) Petaling Jaya, Selangor, Malaysia

Chess career
- Country: Malaysia
- Title: Grandmaster (2025)
- FIDE rating: 2468 (September 2026)
- Peak rating: 2530 (September 2019)

Yeoh Li Tian (born 16 October 1999) is a Malaysian chess grandmaster (GM) and a two-time Malaysian Chess Champion. He is the first Malaysian chess player to earn the Grandmaster title.

== Chess career ==
Yeoh won the Malaysian Chess Championship in 2015 and 2016. In 2017 he won the FIDE Zone 3.3 Championship on tiebreak from Nguyễn Ngọc Trường Sơn. Thanks to this victory, Yeoh received an automatical award of the title International Master. He also achieved a norm for the title Grandmaster, the first ever by a Malaysian, and became the first Malaysian ever to qualify to play in the FIDE World Cup. In this latter event, held in Batumi later in the same year, Yeoh was eliminated by former world champion Viswanathan Anand in the first round.

In the 2019 Philippines Southeast Asian Games, Yeoh delivered Malaysia's first ever Rapid Chess gold in the Sea Games.

He achieved his last GM norm in 2025, leading him to make history by becoming the first Grandmaster from Malaysia.

== Personal life ==
Yeoh is a former student of Catholic High School, Petaling Jaya. He studied mathematics at Imperial College London and underwent his masters at the University of Malaya.
