= Hong Kong China Chess Federation =

- 香港國際象棋總會
- Abbreviation: HKCF
- Formation: 1960
- Headquarters: Hong Kong, China
- President: KK Chan
- Vice President: Robin Lai & Daniel King Wai Lam
- Secretary: Ho Cheung Wong
- Affiliations: FIDE, Asian Chess Federation
- Website: Official website

Hong Kong China Chess Federation
- Chinese: 香港國際象棋總會
Transcriptions
Standard Mandarin
- Hanyu Pinyin: Xiānggǎng guójìxiàngqí zǒng huì
- Wade–Giles: Hsiang-kang kuochihsiangch'i tsung hui
- Yale Romanization: Syānggǎng gwójìsyàngchí dzǔng hwèi
- IPA: [ɕjáŋkàŋ kwǒtɕîɕjɛ̂ntɕʰǐ tsʊ̀ŋ xwêɪ]
Yue: Cantonese
- Yale Romanization: Heūng góng kwok jai jeuhng kèih júng wuìh
- Jyutping: Hoeng1 gong2 gwok3 zai3 zoeng6 kei4 zung2 wui4
- IPA: [hœ́ːŋkɔ̌ːŋ kʷɔ̄ːktsɐ̄itsœ̀ːŋkʰȅi tsʊ̌ŋ wȕːi]

The Hong Kong China Chess Federation (HKCF; Chinese: 香港國際象棋總會) is the governing body for chess in Hong Kong. Founded in 1960, the HKCF joined FIDE in 1961 and is part of Zone 3.3. The President as of August 2026 is KK Chan. Member of the International Correspondence Chess Federation and of the Asian Chess Federation.

The HKCF organises social and competition chess in Hong Kong, and selects players to represent Hong Kong internationally, e.g. the Chess Olympiad, which takes place every second year. Hong Kong has participated at the Chess Olympiads since 1967. It also supports the development of junior players, with school championships organised as well as individual junior championships.

The Hong Kong team in the 1974 Students' Chess Olympiad consisted of five brothers aged 8 to 18. In 1990 the Hong Kong Olympiad team consisted of four players from four countries.

The Asian Cities Chess Championship was launched by the Hong Kong Chess Federation in 1978 under the sponsorship of the Hongkong and Shanghai Bank. The first Asian Cities title went to Singapore.

== Correspondence Chess ==
In 1978, the HKCF established the Correspondence Chess Section, holding a tournament in this format to celebrate the 20th anniversary of the Federation's founding, but it met with little interest.
In 1983, the English-language newspaper South China Morning Post launched a tournament celebrating its 80th anniversary, which garnered significant attention. Taking advantage of this event, the HKCF organized de 1st Hong Kong Correspondence Chess Championship, with Georghe Murphy as the winner. Let's review the list of champions:

1. Georghe Murphy, 1986.
2. Arnulfo Domenden, 1988.
3. Henry Leung, 1990.
4. Henry Leung, 1993.
5. Geoff Wise, 1996.
6. Glenn Turner, 1998.
7. Geoff Wise, 2001.
8. Chris Champion, 2003.
9. Michael Spooner, 2005.
10. Michael Spooner, 2007.
11. Graeme Hall, 2009.
12. Allan Johnston, 2011.
13. Allan Johnston, 2013.
14. Allan Johnston, 2015.
15. Lai Hei Hysan Wong, 2017.
