= Lim Seng Hoo =

Singaporean chess player (born 1956)

Personal information
- Born: 1956 (age 69–70)

Chess career
- Country: Singapore
- Title: International Master (1978)
- FIDE rating: 2440 (July 2026)
- Peak rating: 2440 (January 1979)

Lim Seng Hoo (born 1956) is a Singaporean chess player, who was awarded the title International Master by FIDE in 1978. He won the Singaporean Chess Championship in 1975, 1976, 1977, and 1978 and represented Singapore two times in the Asian Team Chess Championship (1977 and 1974).
