= Giam Choo Kwee =

Singaporean chess player

Personal information
- Born: May 7, 1942
- Died: August 13, 2018 (aged 76)

Chess career
- Country: Singapore
- Title: International Master (1976)
- Peak rating: 2310 (July 1971)

Giam Choo Kwee (7 May 1942 – 13 August 2018) was a Singaporean chess player. He received the FIDE titles of International Master (IM) in 1976 and International Arbiter in 1983. He won the national Singaporean Chess Championship in 1972 and 1973 and represented Singapore four times in Chess Olympiads (1968, 1970, 1972, 1986). At the time of his death, his official FIDE rating was 1820.

== Chess style ==
Kwee's most played openings:

B25	Sicilian, Closed (3 games)
B01	Scandinavian (3 games)
A00	Uncommon Opening (2 games)
C00	French Defense (2 games)
B06	Robatsch (2 games)
