= Terry Toh =

Singaporean chess player

Personal information
- Born: February 9, 1974 (age 52)

Chess career
- Country: Singapore
- Title: International Master (1998)
- FIDE rating: 2394 (January 2018)
- Peak rating: 2419 (October 2007)

Terry Toh (born 1974) is a Singapore chess International Master. He won the national Singaporean Chess Championship in 1995, and represented Singapore in the 1994 Chess Olympiad. His latest FIDE rating is 2394 in January 2018.
