= Ellen Scott =

Ellen Scott may refer to:

- Ellen Scott, fictional character in Miss Saigon
- Ellen Scott, fictional character in The Sands of Time (Sheldon novel)

== See also ==
- Helen Scott (disambiguation)
