= Singapore Chess Federation =

Governing body for chess in Singapore

- Abbreviation: SCF
- Formation: 1949
- Founder: Lim Kok Ann
- Type: Sports governing body
- Purpose: Promotion and development of chess in Singapore
- Headquarters: Singapore Intellectual Games Centre, Bishan
- Location: Singapore
- Region served: Singapore
- Official language: English
- President: Hsu Li Yang
- Vice President: Wong Meng Kong
- CEO: Kevin Goh Wei Ming
- Affiliations: FIDE; Asian Chess Federation; ASEAN Chess Confederation; Singapore National Olympic Council; Sport Singapore
- Website: singaporechess.org.sg

The Singapore Chess Federation (Abbreviation: SCF) is the national governing body for chess in Singapore. Founded in 1949 by Lim Kok Ann, the Federation is responsible for the promotion, administration, and development of chess across Singapore. SCF is affiliated with the International Chess Federation (FIDE), the Asian Chess Federation, and the ASEAN Chess Confederation, and is recognized by the Singapore National Olympic Council (SNOC) and Sport Singapore. SCF is located at Singapore Intellectual Games Centre in Bishan.

== History ==
The Singapore Chess Federation was founded in 1949 by Dr. Lim Kok Ann, who became Singapore's first National Chess Champion that same year. Lim dedicated much of his life to popularizing chess in Singapore, with the aim of making Singapore a "chess-playing nation" with "a chessboard in every home."

Lim introduced innovative teaching methods, including the Bartley system (first used at Bartley School), and taught students across schools and universities, including blind students. He wrote regular chess articles in The Free Press and The Straits Times, organized competitions and tournaments, and raised funds for chess events. In 1961, SCF registered as a society under the Societies Act and later achieved charitable status as an Institute of Public Character, operating as a non-profit organization.

In 1982, Lim Kok Ann accepted an invitation to serve as Secretary General of FIDE in Lucerne, Switzerland, under the first Asian President of FIDE, Florencio Campomanes.

== Mission and vision ==
SCF's vision is to "nurture, promote and sustain a thriving and inclusive chess community, aspiring and achieving sports excellence for Singapore." Its mission is to cultivate a thriving and inclusive chess community, to nurture and develop elite athletes, and to bring the benefits of chess to underserved communities.

== Organization ==
The current president is International Master Hsu Li Yang. The current vice president is Grandmaster Wong Meng Kong, Singapore's first Grandmaster. The CEO is Grandmaster Kevin Goh Wei Ming, a seven-time Singapore Chess Champion.

== Programmes and activities ==
SCF organizes and sanctions national chess tournaments, including the annual Singaporean Chess Championship, youth and school competitions, and selection events for international representation. The Federation supports junior development through training camps, coaching programmes led by FIDE trainers, and partnerships with schools.

SCF runs inclusive programmes, including training for visually impaired players and outreach initiatives. In August 2023, SCF launched the "Chess for Freedom" project, providing regular chess programmes in prisons, including Institution B1 (Singapore Prison Service's maximum security institution) and Prison School. These programmes have been highly successful, with inmates showing improved focus, attitude, and teamwork.

Its promotion of the game has caused participation in youth and interschool events to jump from 517 in 1999 to over 1200 in 2004. As a result, Singapore has one of the highest number of chess players in schools per capita in Asia.

In July 2024, FIDE announced that SCF successfully won the bid to host the FIDE World Chess Championship in November/December 2024, attracting international attention to Singapore's chess scene.

== Notable players ==
Singapore has produced several internationally titled chess players under SCF's development:

- Wong Meng Kong (born 1963) – Singapore's first Grandmaster, achieving the title in 1999. Four-time Singapore Chess Champion and eleven-time Chess Olympiad representative. Winner of the 1979 Asian Junior Chess Championship.
- Wu Shaobin (born 1969) – China's 8th Grandmaster (1998) who later moved to Singapore. Two-time National Singapore Chess Champion, married to former Women's World Chess Champion Xie Jun.
- Kevin Goh Wei Ming (born 1983) – Seven-time Singapore Chess Champion, Grandmaster, and current CEO of SCF. Has represented Singapore in numerous Chess Olympiads since 2004.
- Tin Jingyao (born 2000) – Five-time Singapore Chess Champion, achieved Grandmaster title in August 2022, becoming Singapore's youngest Grandmaster at the time. Represented Singapore at the Chess Olympiad in 2014 and 2016. Defeated super-grandmaster Shakhriyar Mamedyarov in the 2023 Chess World Cup.
- Siddharth Jagadeesh (born 2007) – Singapore's fifth and youngest Grandmaster, achieving the title in May 2024 at age 17. Won the World Under-18 Championship, described by SCF as the "biggest success" in Singapore's chess history.
- Gong Qianyun (born 1985) – Singapore's only Woman Grandmaster, gold medalist at the Commonwealth Chess Championship.

Singapore teams regularly participate in international competitions including the Chess Olympiad, Asian Team Championships, Commonwealth Chess Championships, and the SEA Games.

== See also ==
- Singaporean Chess Championship
- Lim Kok Ann
