= Amir Faiz Amirul =

Malaysian chess player (born 2007)

Personal information
- Born: March 3, 2007 (age 19)

Chess career
- Country: Malaysia
- Title: Candidate Master (2014)
- Peak rating: 1708 (March 2024)

Amir Faiz Amirul is a Malaysian chess player. He is the youngest Candidate Master of Fédération Internationale des Échecs or World Chess Federation (FIDE) in Malaysia's history. He earned the title of Candidate Master at age 7 years and 5 months. Despite finishing level on points with the winner, he emerged as a Runner-Up on tie-break in the 10th Asian Schools Chess Championship in 2014 which was held in Washington High School in Taichung, Taiwan.

== Chess ==
At 5 years and 10 months, Amir Faiz finished 4th in the 2013 National Age Group (NAG) chess championship organized by the Malaysian Chess Federation (MCF) in UTP Tronoh, Perak. He qualified for the Malaysian youth/junior team three years in a row between 2013 and 2015, finishing 4th in 2013 at Perak, 1st in 2014 at Selangor, and 3rd in 2015 at F.T. of Kuala Lumpur.

Amir Faiz bin Amirul represented Malaysia at the World Youth Chess Championship (2013, Al Ain, UAE), Asian Schools Chess Championship (2013, Hikkaduwa, Sri Lanka, and 2014, Taichung, Taiwan), ASEAN+ Age Group Chess Championship (2014, Macau SAR and 2015, Singapore) and Asian Dragons Chess Championship (2014, New Taipei City, Taiwan). He is Malaysia's youngest qualifier for the WYCC. At 6 years and 9 months, Amir Faiz represented Malaysia at the WYCC in Al Ain, UAE.

His international achievements include 8th in Blitz at the 9th Asian Schools Chess Championship 2013 (Sri Lanka), Team Bronze in Blitz at the 15th ASEAN+ Age Group 2014 (Macau) and Silver in the 10th Asian Schools Chess Championship 2014 (Taiwan).

Amir Faiz also represents the F.T. of Kuala Lumpur state team at the national level Majlis Sukan Sekolah-Sekolah Malaysia (MSSM) Chess Competition. At the 2014 MSSM held in Kuching, Sarawak, aged 7 and the 2016 MSSM held in Pengkalan Chepa, Kelantan aged 9 he was the youngest medalist in the competition. He is also the 2018 MSSWPKL U12 Champion, 2017 and 2016 MSSWPKL U10 Champion, 2014 U9 Champion and the 2015 U10 Runners-Up (on tie-break), as well as the Bangsar Zone U12 Champion in 2019, U10 Champion for 2017 and 2015.

In team events, apart from Bronze in the ASEAN Age Group 2014 Faiz was also the Team Captain for the Kuala Lumpur U12 MSSM Team for 2 years i.e. 2018–2019. The KL emerged Champion in the 2018 MSSM in Terengganu and Runners-Up (on tie-break) in the 2019 Putrajaya MSSM. Additionally, Amir Faiz is also a team member of the S.K.TTDI(1) Kuala Lumpur team which emerged champion in the 3rd SKBJ Junior C.C. 2017, runners-up in Bangsar zone MSSWPKL 2017 and third in the MSSWPKL State Finals for 2017 and 2016.

As of 3 March 2024, CM Amir Faiz have won more than 10 individual titles in Malaysia in the 5 states of Selangor(5), Negeri Sembilan(1), Perak(2) and the Federal Territories of Kuala Lumpur(8) and Putrajaya(1).

== Fencing ==
In 2015, he took up fencing. On August 23, 2015, Amir Faiz Amirul in his first ever fencing competition he'd participated in won the event, a U8/U9 foil mixed event organized by Touche Fencing in Petaling Jaya, Selangor. In December 2015, he reached the Quarter Finals of a U10 foil competition in the F.T. of Kuala Lumpur.

Early in 2016, Faiz emerged Runners-Up and bronze medalist in the Touche Grand Finals and S.K. TTDI(1) Invitational foil events respectively. He also qualified from his pool to the last 64 of the Malaysian Fencing Federation GP3 U12 foil competition held in Putrajaya and made it to the 1/16 round. In May 2017, Amir Faiz came back from a 5-months break from competitive fencing to win his second title in the third leg of the 2017 Touche Fencing Circuit for the U10 foil category.

Faiz first competed in the sabre event in 2016 qualified for the Quarter-finals in his first ever sabre event held in KL. In 2018 and 2019, Faiz secured medals in the U12 Sabre category when competing in the Musketeers Challenge in Selangor. Amir Faiz Amirul qualified for his first national fencing competition finals in November 2019 when he obtained the U12 Sabre Silver medal in the national competition organised by the Malaysian Fencing Federation.

In 2019, Amir Faiz took part in his second international fencing competition held in Singapore, he took part in both the Foil and Sabre event in both the U-12 and U-14 categories. In both the U-12 foil and sabre event, Faiz managed to qualify from his pool and made it to the 1/16 round. In the U-14 event, he made it to the 1/32 round in both weapons. On the local circuit, Faiz emerged champion in 3 events and obtained medals in both the Foil and Sabre U-12 events. At the end of 2019, Amir Faiz appeared in his first MFF national finals in the U-12 Sabre event where he obtained the silver medal and was ranked as high as number five nationally by the Malaysian Fencing Federation(MFF) in the U-12 foil category.

International The Ysparks International Fencing Competition 2016 held in Singapore was Amir Faiz's first international assignment for fencing. He qualified from his pool in the U-10 foil event into the last 64 and made it to the 1/16 round. 2020 was a breakthrough year for Amir Faiz Amirul internationally when he won his first 2 international medals in the 1st Touche Minime International Competition 2020. In the individual U-15 Sabre event, Faiz managed to qualify for the semi-finals by defeating sabreurists from Indonesia and Malaysia. He subsequently received the bronze medal. The next day, he took part in the U-15 Sabre Team event as part of the Urban Fencing Malaysia team. The team emerged champion in the international competition.

== Badminton ==
2016 marks the third time in as many years that Faiz represents his school i.e. Sekolah Kebangsaan Taman Tun Dr. Ismail (1) Kuala Lumpur in a new game. This time it is badminton after chess in 2014 and fencing in 2015. He took part in the Singles category of the U10 event at the Majlis Sukan Sekolah-Sekolah Wilayah Persekutuan Kuala Lumpur (MSSWPKL) Bangsar zone badminton competition held in February 2016.

== ENGLISH - Scrabble & Buzzword ==
Amir Faiz began to represent his school in Scrabble competitions beginning 2018 and finished 7th in a national level competition in Selangor. In 2019, Faiz was part of a 2-member team which secured the silver medal in the KL Schools Scrabble competition held in conjunction with the English Language week.

Faiz was also part of a 2-member team with Hanna Mia which bagged the bronze medal in Buzzword at the National English Language and Scouts Carnival 2019 held in Kuantan, Pahang.

== Media ==
In 2013 and 2014, Malaysia's national TV station TV3 interviewed Faiz. In May 2014, he was featured in a TV3 children's program, Bananana.
