= Pakistani Chess Championship =

The Pakistani Chess Championship is organized by the Chess Federation of Pakistan. Prior to 1970 four championships were held in West Pakistan without participation by players from East Pakistan. This changed in 1970 with the founding of the Pakistan National Chess Federation, which for the first time incorporated players and executive members from both parts of Pakistan, and the national championship that year was held in Chittagong. In 1977 the name of the organization was changed to the Chess Federation of Pakistan. The first Pakistani Women's Chess Championship was held in 2000.

== Dual Championships in 2026 ==
In 2026, two National Championships were conducted by two different organizations claiming to be the Chess Federation of Pakistan . Both were named "34th Men's National Championship" for the Open section. However, the women's tournaments were designated as the "9th National Women's Chess Championship" (Karachi) and the "10th National Women's Chess Championship" (Islamabad), respectively. Former Championship set was held in Karachi from 11th July till 16th July, with FM Amer Karim winning the Men's section and Hafiza Mashal Rashid winning the Women's section. Latter was held in Islamabad from 10th July till 15th July, with Zaman Sohail winning the Men's section and Fareeha Siddiqui winning the Women's section.

The dual championships appear to have resulted from an internal dispute between the previous leadership of the Chess Federation of Pakistan and the leadership elected earlier in 2026.Only the former is listed and is recognised by the international chess federation

== Open championship winners ==
| | Year | Place | Champion |
|---|---|---|---|
| 1 | 1959 | Lahore | Shaikh Muhammad Akram |
| 2 | 1960 | Lahore | Shaikh Muhammad Akram |
| 3 | 1962 | Lahore | Abdul Sattar |
| 4 | 1964 | Karachi | Shaikh Muhammad Akram |
| 5 | 1970 | Chittagong | Zahiruddin Farooqui |
| 6 | 1974 | Karachi | Ghulam Dastgir Butt |
| 7 | 1976 | Rawalpindi | Zahiruddin Farooqui |
| 8 | 1978 | Karachi | Zahiruddin Farooqui |
| 9 | 1979 | Karachi | Zahiruddin Farooqui |
| 10 | 1980 | Lahore | Shahzad Mirza |
| 11 | 1982 | Karachi | Mahmood Khan |
| 12 | 1983 | Sargodha | Mahmood Lodhi |
| 13 | 1984 | Quetta | Mahmood Lodhi |
| 14 | 1985 | Karachi | Mahmood Lodhi |
| 15 | 1986 | Sargodha | Mahmood Lodhi |
| 16 | 1987 | Quetta | Mahmood Lodhi |
| 17 | 1988 | Karachi | Mahmood Lodhi |
| 18 | 1990 | Quetta | Mahmood Lodhi |
| 19 | 1991 | Lahore | Tunveer Gillani |
| 20 | 1993 | Karachi | Mahmood Lodhi |
| 21 | 1997 | Peshawar | Shahzad Mirza |
| 22 | 1998 | Quetta | Mahmood Lodhi |
| 23 | 1999 | Lahore | Mahmood Lodhi |
| 24 | 2004 | Lahore | Tunveer Gillani |
| 25 | 2006 | Rawalpindi | Tunveer Gillani |
| 26 | 2008 | Karachi | Mahmood Lodhi |
| 27 | 2010 | Islamabad | Mahmood Lodhi |
| 28 | 2012 | Karachi | Mahmood Lodhi |
| 29 | 2014 | Lahore | Mahmood Lodhi |
| 30 | 2016 | Karachi | Mahmood Lodhi |
| 31 | 2018 | Lahore | Mahmood Lodhi |
| 32 | 2022 | Gilgit | Amer Karim |
| 33 | 2024 | Islamabad | Mafaaz Khalid |
| 34 | 2026 | Karachi | Amer Karim |

Multiple titles:

- 16 titles: IM Mahmood Lodhi
- 4 titles: Zahiruddin Farooqui
- 3 titles: Tunveer Gillani , Shaikh Muhammad Akram
- 2 titles: IM Shahzad Mirza , FM Amer Karim

== Women's championship winners ==
| No. | Year | Place | Champion |
|---|---|---|---|
| 1 | 2000 | Karachi | Zenobia Wasif |
| 2 | 2010 | Islamabad | Nida Mishraz Siddiqui |
| 3 | 2012 | Karachi | Zenobia Wasif |
| 4 | 2014 | Lahore | Zenobia Wasif |
| 5 | 2016 | Karachi | Ghazala |
| 6 | 2018 | Karachi | Zenobia Wasif |
| 7 | 2022 | Gilgit | Mehak Gul |
| 8 | 2024 | Islamabad | Sehba Shah |
| 9 | 2026 | Karachi | Hafiza Mashal Rashid |
