= Wong Meng Kong =

Singaporean chess grandmaster (born 1963)

Personal information
- Born: 18 September 1963 (age 62)

Chess career
- Country: Singapore
- Title: Grandmaster (1999)
- Peak rating: 2507 (July 2000)

Wong Meng Kong (born 18 September 1963) is a Singaporean chess grandmaster. He won the Singaporean Chess Championship in 1986, 1989, 1990 and 1991. He represented Singapore at the Chess Olympiad eleven times (1982, 1984, 1986, 1988, 1990, 1992, 1996, 2000, 2002, 2004, 2006).

Wong won the 1979 Asian Junior Chess Championship in Sivakasi. In 1999, he was awarded the title of Grandmaster by FIDE, becoming the first Singaporean to achieve this feat.

Wong did his 'O'-Levels at Anglo-Chinese School in 1979 and his 'A'-Levels at Anglo-Chinese Junior College in 1981. He went on to get his medical degree from National University of Singapore in 1987. He currently resides in Malaysia where he is an Associate Professor at Newcastle University Medicine Malaysia.
