= Helen Milligan =

Scottish-New Zealand chess player (born 1962)

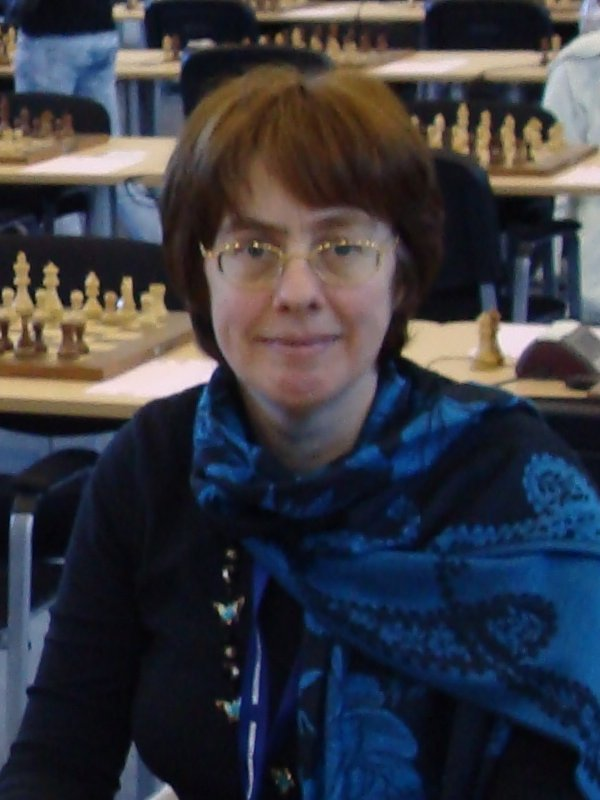
- Helen Milligan at the 39th Chess Olympiad in Khanty-Mansiysk, Russia 2010.

Personal information
- Born: 25 August 1962 (age 64) Glasgow, Scotland

Chess career
- Country: Scotland (until 2007); New Zealand (since 2007)
- Title: Candidate Master (2013); Woman FIDE Master (2000)
- Peak rating: 2138 (July 1999)

Helen Milligan (née Scott; 25 August 1962) is a Scottish-New Zealand chess player holding the FIDE titles of Candidate Master (CM) and Woman FIDE Master (WFM), and three-time Asian senior women's champion.

In 2004, Milligan co-authored the book "Chess for Children" with Grandmaster Murray Chandler. She currently works as a chess coach, and runs chess events for her club, North Shore Chess Club. She also holds the FIDE titles of International Arbiter (IA) and FIDE Trainer (FT).

== Biography ==
Helen Milligan gained a doctorate in astrophysics from the University of St Andrews in 1989; her thesis was on the pulsation of Delta Scuti stars.

Milligan has won or jointly won the Scottish women's championship three times: in 1982, 1986 and 1988. In 1983 she was joint British ladies' champion with Rani Hamid.

Milligan represented Scotland in eleven Women's Chess Olympiads between 1982 and 2006. Since 2008 she has played for New Zealand in this competition, having transferred national federations in 2007.

Milligan became Oceania women's champion at the Queenstown Chess Classic tournament in January 2012. She also competed in Women's Zonal Chess Championships in Bath 1987, Blackpool 1990, Delden 1993, Saint Vincent 1999, and Gold Coast 2009.

She won the Asian senior women's champion title in 2015 in Larestan, Iran, 2016 in Mandalay, Myanmar and 2017 in Auckland.

== Notable games ==
- Diane Savereide vs Helen Milligan, Thessaloniki Olympiad (women) 1988, Russian Game: Classical, (C42), 0-1
- Helen Milligan vs Dana Reizniece, European Team Ch (women) 2001, Sicilian Defence: Old Sicilian, (B32), 1-0
- Subbaraman Meenakshi vs Helen Milligan, Gibraltar Masters 2004, Queen's Indian Defence, (E12), 0-1
- Helen Milligan vs Anthony Ker, Queenstown Classic 2012, Pirc Defense: Classical Variation, (B08), 1-0
