= Kevin Goh Wei Ming =

Singaporean chess grandmaster (born 1983)

Personal information
- Born: 7 July 1983 (age 43)

Chess career
- Country: Singapore
- Title: Grandmaster (2020)
- FIDE rating: 2412 (July 2026)
- Peak rating: 2501 (April 2020)

Kevin Goh Wei Ming (Chinese: 吴伟铭; pinyin: Wú Wěimíng; Pe̍h-ōe-jī: Gô͘ Úi-bêng, born 7 July 1983) is a Singaporean chess grandmaster. He is an eight-time Singaporean champion (2006, 2007, 2008, 2009, 2012, 2013, 2017 and 2023) and has represented Singapore in the Chess Olympiad since 2004.

== Chess career ==
In 2000, Goh won the boys under 18 section at the 1st ASEAN Age Group Chess Championships in Vũng Tàu, Vietnam. At the 2005 Southeast Asian Games, Goh won two bronze medals, in the men's standard individual event and in the teams' one. In 2010 he played in Singapore the first game of an exhibition blitz match between top Singaporean players and Garry Kasparov. In March 2011, in Hungary, he won back to back the First Saturday GM tournament in Budapest and the Caissa GM tournament in Kecskemét; in this latter he achieved his first norm required for the title of Grandmaster. The next year, Goh gained his second norm at the Asian Nations Cup in Zaozhuang, China, where he played for team Singapore. In 2018, he finished second, behind Tsegmed Batchuluun, in the QCD-Prof Lim Kok Ann Grandmasters Invitational tournament, held in Singapore, also achieving his third and final grandmaster norm. Goh was awarded the title of Grandmaster by FIDE in 2020, when his Elo rating exceeded 2500.

== Books ==
- Kevin Goh Wei Ming (2014). The Sicilian Najdorf 6 Bg5. Chess Developments. Everyman Chess. ISBN 978-1781940211.
