= Tin Jingyao =

Singaporean chess grandmaster (born 2000)

Personal information
- Born: 13 July 2000 (age 26)

Chess career
- Country: Singapore
- Title: Grandmaster (2022)
- FIDE rating: 2598 (November 2026)
- Peak rating: 2602 (October 2026)

Tin Jingyao (Chinese: 张景尧, born 13 July 2000) is a Singaporean chess grandmaster. He is a five-time winner of the Singapore Chess Championship and has represented Singapore in the Chess Olympiad.

In August 2022, Tin was awarded the title of Grandmaster (GM) by FIDE and became the youngest player in Singapore to achieve the title. He is also the highest-rated Singaporean player.

== Early life and education ==
As of October 2022, Tin is currently pursuing a degree in computing at the National University of Singapore.

== Chess career ==
Tin began playing chess in 2008. In 2010, Tin represented Singapore in the 11th ASEAN Chess Championships (Open U10 category) and won the only gold medal for Singapore.

Tin achieved his first Grandmaster norm in 2015 by winning the Asean Under-20 chess tournament and was directly awarded the title of International Master.

He has won the Singapore Chess Championship five times; in 2016, 2017, 2018, 2019 and 2021. He also represented Singapore in the Chess Olympiad in 2014 (5.5/10 on board 4), 2016 (5/10 on board 3), 2022 (7/10 on board 1) and 2024.

He qualified for the Chess World Cup 2021 where he was defeated by Timur Gareyev on tiebreaks in the first round.

Tin achieved his third Grandmaster norm at the Hanoi Grandmaster Chess Tournament in May 2022.

In December 2022, Tin finished second place in the III Elllobregat Open Chess tournament where he defeated Hans Niemann in the seventh round of the tournament.

In August 2023, Tin caused an upset by defeating super-grandmaster Shakhriyar Mamedyarov (who was the tournament's ninth seed) in the second round of the 2023 Chess World Cup. Tin advanced to the third round of a Chess World Cup for the first time, where he was defeated by Rasmus Svane.
