= Tunveer Mohyuddin Gillani =

Pakistani chess player (born 1969)

Personal information
- Born: February 17, 1969 (age 57) Lahore, Pakistan

Chess career
- Country: Pakistan
- Title: FIDE Master (2021)
- Peak rating: 2300 (October 2007)

Tunveer Mohyuddin Gillani (Urdu: تنویر محی الدین گیلانی; born 17 February 1969) is a Pakistani chess player and FIDE Master (FM). He is a multiple-time national champion and has represented Pakistan in numerous international chess events including Chess Olympiads, Asian Championships, and Zonal tournaments. He is one of the most prominent figures in Pakistan's chess history.

== Early life ==
Tunveer Mohyuddin Gillani was born in Lahore, Pakistan. He developed a keen interest in chess from a young age and went on to become one of the country's leading chess players.

== National career ==
Gillani is a three-time National Chess Champion of Pakistan:

- 1991 – Lahore
- 2004 – Lahore
- 2006 – Rawalpindi

== International career ==
=== Chess Olympiads ===
Gillani represented Pakistan in five Chess Olympiads:

- 1992 – 30th Olympiad, Manila – First board (+6, =1, -5)
- 2000 – 34th Olympiad, Istanbul – Second board (+3, =5, -4)
- 2004 – 36th Olympiad, Calvià – First board (+3, =2, -6)
- 2006 – 37th Olympiad, Turin – First board (+6, =2, -0); won an individual gold medal with performance rating of 2316
- 2010 – 39th Olympiad, Khanty-Mansiysk – Fourth board (+3, =2, -6)

=== Other international events ===
Gillani has also participated in:

- Asian Zonal Chess Tournaments (2007 in Bangladesh, 2008 in India)
- Asian Chess Championships (1992, 1994, 1996)
- Commonwealth Chess Championship (2010 in India)
- Asian Team Chess Championship in Dubai (individual silver medal)
- Lloyds Bank Chess Championship (1994 in England)
- Asian Junior Chess Championship (placed 4th)

== Titles and achievements ==
- Awarded the title of FIDE Master in 2021
- Peak FIDE rating: 2405
- Individual gold medalist at the 37th Chess Olympiad (2006)
- Silver medal at the Asian Team Chess Championship (year unconfirmed)

== Playing style ==
Gillani is known for his versatile opening repertoire:

- As White: Owen's Defense, Closed Sicilian, French Defense, Ruy López
- As Black: Sicilian Defense, Philidor Defense, Modern Defense, Pirc Defense

== Notable games ==
Gillani has played notable games against players like Faisal Khairallah and CHARLEE Porthor. His style is marked by positional depth and tactical awareness.

== Online presence ==
- FIDE Profile
- Chess.com Profile
- ChessBase Profile

== See also ==
- Pakistan Chess Championship
- Chess Olympiad
- Pakistan Chess Federation

== Biography ==
Tunveer Mohyuddin Gillani three times won Pakistani Chess Championship: in 1991, 2004, and 2006. In 2009, in New Delhi he participated in World Chess Championship Asian Zonal 3.2 Tournament and ranked 8th.

Tunveer Mohyuddin Gillani played for Pakistan in the Chess Olympiads:

- In 1992, at first board in the 30th Chess Olympiad in Manila (+6, =1, -5),
- In 2000, at second board in the 34th Chess Olympiad in Istanbul (+3, =5, -4),
- In 2004, at first board in the 36th Chess Olympiad in Calvià (+3, =2, -6),
- In 2006, at first board in the 37th Chess Olympiad in Turin (+6, =2, -0) and won individual gold medal,
- In 2010, at fourth board in the 39th Chess Olympiad in Khanty-Mansiysk (+3, =2, -6).
