= Mas Hafizulhelmi =

Malaysian chess player (born 1981)

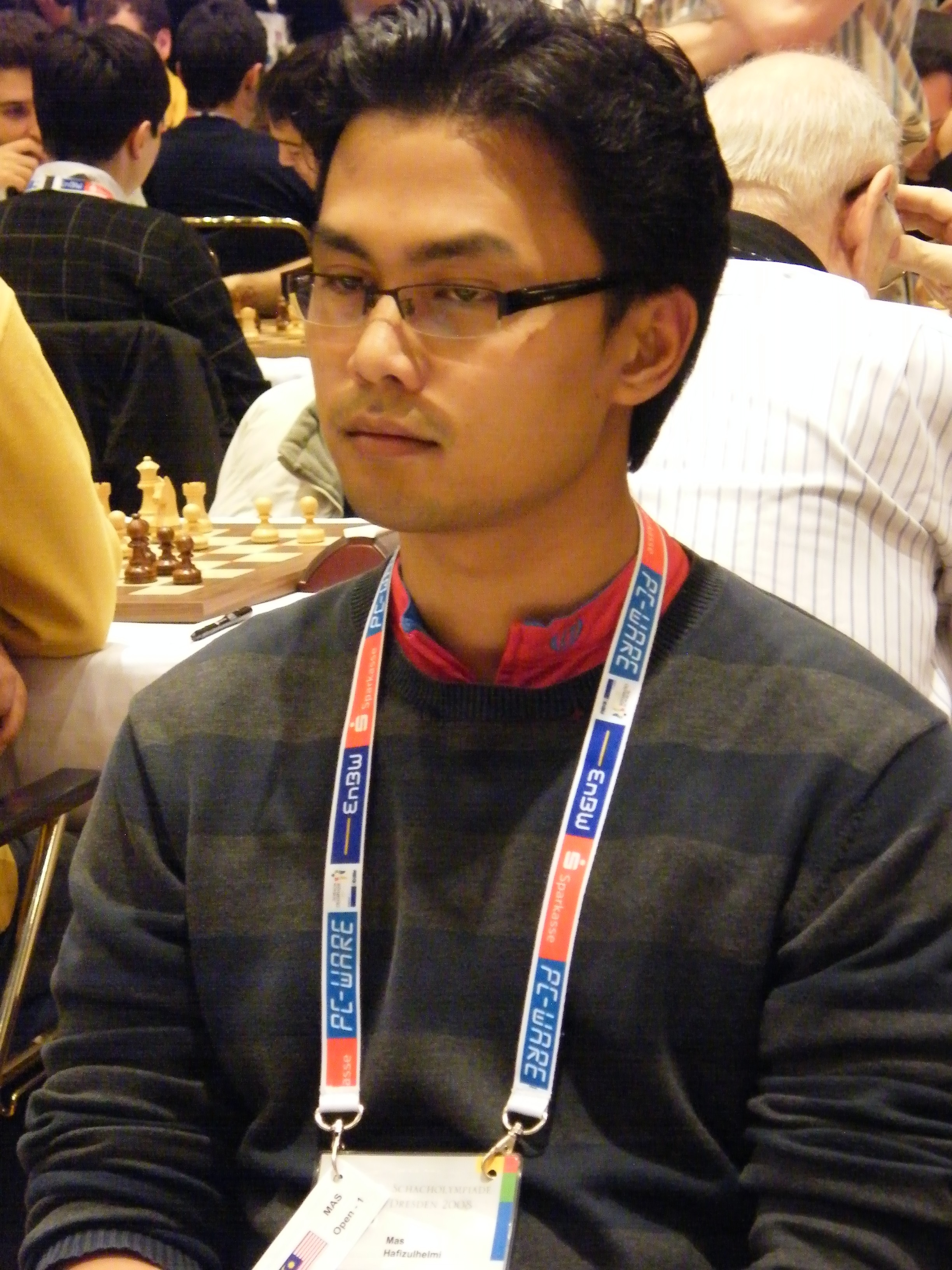
- Hafizulhelmi at the 38th Chess Olympiad in 2008

Personal information
- Born: Mas Hafizulhelmi Rahman; 1 January 1981 (age 45) Kelantan, Malaysia

Chess career
- Country: Malaysia
- Title: International Master (1998)
- Peak rating: 2456 (January 2001)

Mas Hafizulhelmi Rahman (Jawi: مس حفيظالحلمي رحمن; born 1 January 1981) or Hafizulhelmi Mas is a Malaysian chess International Master (IM) and a two-time Malaysian Chess Champion. He is the second Malaysian to receive the title of IM after chess veteran Jimmy Liew.

== Chess career ==
=== Early years ===
Born and raised in Kelantan, Hafizulhelmi started playing chess at the early age of 4 where he was first introduced to the game by his father. His first recorded tournament was the Kelantan Closed (Open Category) in 1987 where he scored 1.5/7 at the age of 6. Throughout his life in chess, Hafizulhelmi idolized the former World Chess Champion Anatoly Karpov and imitated his playing-style.

=== National champion ===
Hafizulhelmi won the Malaysian Chess Championship twice consecutively in 1994 and 1995. He has also represented Malaysia in nine Chess Olympiads, where he is ranked 4th in total appearances among all Malaysian chess players, the latest being in the 39th Chess Olympiad held in Khanty-Mansiysk, Russia.

=== Notable games ===
Hafizulhelmi's best moment in chess was defeating 10 time World Chess Champion candidate, the late Grandmaster (GM) Viktor Korchnoi where he played the Ruy Lopez, Exchange Variation (C69) in the 37th Chess Olympiad held in Turin, Italy. He also defeated GM Ian Rogers in the 2007 Sydney QVB GM Invitational Tournament which Rogers later on became his coach for the 2008 Malaysian Open. His last notable game was a draw against an 11-year-old Gukesh Domamaraju in 2017, who is currently the reigning World Chess Champion.

=== National chess records ===
- Youngest Malaysian International Master (17 years); later surpassed by Poh Yu Tian (15 years) in 2024 after 26 years of holding the record
- Longest chess game played in a tournament by a Malaysian (131 moves against CM Leon Kempen, Haarlem 2009)
- Most FIDE rated games played by a Malaysian in a single year (150 games in 2008)
