= Malaysian Chess Federation =

- Persekutuan Catur Malaysia
- Formation: 1975; 51 years ago
- Headquarters: 34-2, Persiaran 65C, Pekeliling Business Centre, Off Jalan Pahang Barat, 53000 Kuala Lumpur, Malaysia
- Website: malaysiachess.org

The Malaysian Chess Federation (MCF; Malay: Persekutuan Catur Malaysia) is the principal authority over all chess events in Malaysia and organizes the Malaysian Chess Championship. The MCF promotes and coordinates all major chess events in the 13 Malaysian states and is an active sports body in Malaysia. The Federation is affiliated to the world governing body, FIDE, and is part of the ASEAN Chess Confederation.

== Controversies ==
In 2017, a 12-year-old girl was barred from attending the National Scholastic Chess Championship organised by the MCF held in a school in Putrajaya over her “seductive” knee-length dress. The news sparked outrage online with the MCF vowing to investigate the incident while denying that the decision was due to religious sensitivities.

== Notable players ==
- Amir Faiz Amirul, youngest Candidate Master in Malaysia's history
