= Tan Lian Ann =

Singaporean chess player (born 1947)

Personal information
- Born: September 8, 1947 (age 79)

Chess career
- Country: Singapore
- Title: International Master (1973)
- Peak rating: 2415 (July 1982)

Tan Lian Ann (born 8 September 1947) is a Singaporean chess master.

== Career ==
He played at Perth 1962/63 (AUS-ch, John Purdy won); at Vrnjačka Banja 1963 (7th World Junior Chess Championship (U-20), Florin Gheorghiu won), and at Barcelona 1965 (9th WJCh, q-5, Robert Hübner won).

He was six times champion at the Singaporean Chess Championship, and at the age of 16, he won Malaysian chess championship. He shared first at Hong Kong 1972 (East Asian Zonal); tied for 16-18th at Petropolis 1973 (Interzonal, Henrique Mecking won); took 2nd, behind Eugenio Torre, at Melbourne 1975 (Zonal); tied for 18-20th at Manila 1976 (Interzonal, Mecking won).

Tan Lian Ann represented Singapore four times in Chess Olympiads:

- In 1968, at first board in 18th Chess Olympiad in Lugano.
- In 1970, at first board in 19th Chess Olympiad in Siegen.
- In 1972, at first board in 20th Chess Olympiad in Skopje.
- In 1992, at third board in 30th Chess Olympiad in Manila.

and twice in Asian Team Chess Championships:

- In 1987, at first board in 7th ATCh in Singapore.
- In 1991, at second board in 9th ATCh in Penang.

He took 8th in the 21st Cairnhill Open at Singapore 2003.

He was awarded the International Master title in 1973, after qualifying for the Interzonal in Petrópolis, Brazil.
