= Hsu Li Yang =

Singaporean chess player

Personal information
- Born: September 26, 1972 (age 53)

Chess career
- Country: Singapore
- Title: International Master (1994)
- FIDE rating: 2427 (July 2026)
- Peak rating: 2455 (July 1993)

Hsu Li Yang (born 1972) is a Professor of Infectious Diseases and the first Vice Dean of Global Health in Saw Swee Hock School of Public Health at the National University of Singapore. He is also a Singaporean chess International Master.

== Education ==
Professor Hsu received his MBBS from the Yong Loo Lin School of Medicine in 1998 and his Masters in Public Health from the Harvard T.H. Chan School of Public Health in 2007. He also has a Diploma in Tropical Medicine and Hygiene from the Institute of Tropical and Preventive Medicine and a Specialist Accreditation in Infectious Diseases from NUS.

== Chess Championship ==
Professor Hsu won the national Singaporean Chess Championship in 1992 and 1993 when he was an undergraduate. He represented Singapore three times in Chess Olympiads (1992, 1994, 2000). His current FIDE rating is 2427.
