= Lim Kok Ann =

Singaporean chess player and microbiologist (1920–2003)

- 林国安
- Born: 27 January 1920
- Died: 8 March 2003 (aged 83)
- Occupations: Microbiologist; Chess organizer
- Known for: Enterovirus research "Father of chess" in Singapore
- Title: Secretary-General of FIDE
- Spouse: Rosie Seow Guat Kheng
- Children: Five, including Stella Kon
- Relatives: Lim Boon Keng (grandfather); Seow Poh Leng (father-in-law)

Lim Kok Ann (simplified Chinese: 林国安; traditional Chinese: 林國安; pinyin: Lín Guó'ān) (27 January 1920 – 8 March 2003) was a Singaporean chess player and organizer, and a microbiologist specializing in enterovirus research.

== Early life ==
Born 27 January 1920, Lim had been a student at Anglo-Chinese School and Raffles Institution in 1936 and in 1938 was a Queen's scholar.

== Career ==
=== Microbiology ===
As a microbiologist at the University of Malaya, Lim was the first to isolate the specific virus (Influenza A/Singapore/1/57) during the 1957–1958 influenza pandemic using chicken embryos in eggs.

In 1959, while working for the World Health Organization in Houston, Texas, he developed the Lim-Benyesh-Melnick (LBM) protocol for serotyping human enterovirus isolates. By introducing various combinations of viruses in each egg (instead of testing for each one individually), scientists can more quickly isolate the specific virus using fewer trials, a procedure still in use decades later.

In August 1965, Lim was appointed as the dean of the medical faculty at the University of Singapore, and in the 1960s he promoted acceptance of the novel Sabin polio vaccine amidst public skepticism of the new treatment.

=== Chess ===
FIDE, the world chess federation, called Lim one of "the Fathers of Asian chess" for his work in promoting the game. The Straits Times called him "the father of chess" in Singapore.

Lim founded the Singapore Chess Federation in 1949 which held its first national chess championship the same year. Lim won the event himself, and again in 1960 and 1968, and served as president of the federation for 18 years.

From 1982 to 1988, Lim was the secretary general of FIDE, creating and publishing the first FIDE handbook. He is remembered for modernizing the fifty move rule in the computer age and creating the "Lim System" for tournament pairings.

=== Arts ===
Lim co-founded Singapore's first multi-disciplinary arts centre, Centre 65, with Goh Poh Seng in 1965 to promote the arts.

== Personal life ==
Lim was the grandson of Lim Boon Keng, a doctor, educator, and philanthropist. Lim was married to Rosie Seow Guat Kheng (1922–1994), the daughter of Seow Poh Leng, a bank manager. She was an actress and a teacher.

Lim was a Methodist, and had five children, among them the writer and playwright Stella Kon. He died of a heart attack on 8 March 2003.

== Selected publications ==
- Lim, K. A., Smith, A., Hale, J. H., & Glass, J. (1957). Influenza outbreak in Singapore. Lancet, 273(6999), 791–796. https://doi.org/10.1016/s0140-6736(57)90893-0
- Lim, K. A., & Benyesh-Melnick, M. (1960). Typing of viruses by combinations of antiserum pools. Application to typing of enteroviruses (Coxsackie and ECHO). Journal of immunology, 84, 309–317.
- Lim, K. A., Chan, Y. C., Phoon, W. O., & Hanam, E. (1964). Dengue-type viruses isolated in Singapore. Bulletin of the World Health Organization, 30(2), 227–240.
- Kazic, Bozidar; Keene, Raymond; Lim, Kok Ann (1985), The Official Laws of Chess, Batsford, ISBN 0-7134-4802-4
