= FIDE World Chess Championship 2002 =

Chess tournament in Moscow, Russia

World Chess Championship 2002
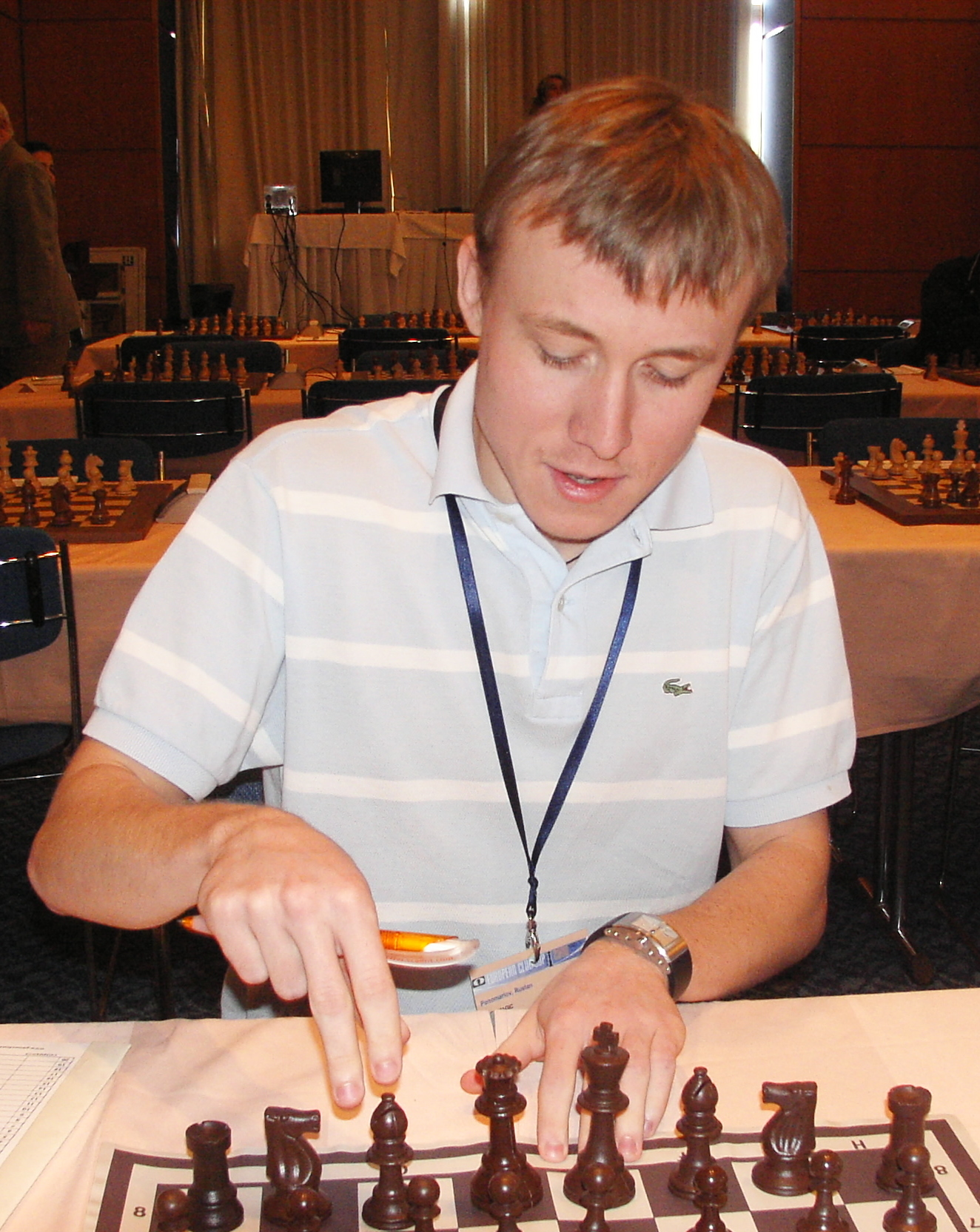
- Ruslan Ponomariov

Tournament information
- Sport: Chess
- Location: Moscow
- Dates: 27 November 2001–23 January 2002
- Administrator: FIDE
- Tournament format: Single-elimination tournament
- Host: Russian Chess Federation
- Participants: 128

Final positions
- Champion: (Ukraine) Ruslan Ponomariov
- Runner-up: (Ukraine) Vasyl Ivanchuk

Tournament statistics
- Matches played: 127

The FIDE World Chess Championship 2002 was held in Moscow, Russia. The first six rounds were played between 27 November and 14 December 2001, and the final match started on 16 January and ended on 23 January 2002. The Ukrainian Grandmaster Ruslan Ponomariov, aged 18, won the championship and became the youngest FIDE World Champion.

== Background ==
At the time of this championship, the World title was split. The Classical World Champion, Vladimir Kramnik, did not participate, as well as the previous Classical Champion and world's highest-rated player, Garry Kasparov. However, all other strongest players of the world took part, including the top seed and winner of the previous FIDE World Championship Viswanathan Anand.

== Playing conditions ==
The championship was a knockout tournament similar to other FIDE World Chess Championships between 1998 and 2004: the players were paired for short matches, with losers eliminated. The field of 128 participants was reduced to one winner over seven rounds.

Rounds 1–5 consisted of a two-game match, followed by tie breaks at faster time controls if required. The time control for regular games was 75 minutes for the first 40 moves and 15 minutes for the rest of the game, with 30 seconds added after each move. Tie breaks consisted of two rapid chess games (20 minutes each + 10 seconds per move); followed by two blitz games if required (5 minutes + 10 seconds per move); followed by a single Armageddon chess game if required (white has 6 minutes and must win, black has 5 minutes and only needs to draw). The semifinals (round 6) were best of four games, and the final was best of eight games, with the same conditions for the tie-breaks.

In addition to previous criticisms of the knockout format (see FIDE World Chess Championship 1998#Controversies), this tournament was criticised by Garry Kasparov for using a faster time control, which Kasparov claimed was lowering the standard of the games.

== Participants ==
All players are Grandmasters unless indicated otherwise.

1. Viswanathan Anand (IND), 2797
2. Michael Adams (ENG), 2744
3. Alexander Morozevich (RUS), 2739
4. Vasyl Ivanchuk (UKR), 2731
5. Peter Leko (HUN), 2730
6. Evgeny Bareev (RUS), 2719
7. Boris Gelfand (ISR), 2714
8. Veselin Topalov (BUL), 2711
9. Alexei Shirov (ESP), 2706
10. Rustam Kasimdzhanov (UZB), 2704
11. Ilya Smirin (ISR), 2702
12. Alexander Khalifman (RUS), 2699
13. Loek van Wely (NED), 2695
14. Kiril Georgiev (BUL), 2695
15. Peter Svidler (RUS), 2695
16. Anatoly Karpov (RUS), 2692
17. Alexey Dreev (RUS), 2690
18. Judit Polgár (HUN), 2686
19. Ruslan Ponomariov (UKR), 2684
20. Ye Jiangchuan (CHN), 2677
21. Joël Lautier (FRA), 2675
22. Nigel Short (ENG), 2675
23. Zurab Azmaiparashvili (GEO), 2674
24. Alexander Grischuk (RUS), 2669
25. Zhang Zhong (CHN), 2667
26. Alexander Beliavsky (SLO), 2659
27. Viktor Bologan (MDA), 2655
28. Predrag Nikolić (BIH), 2652
29. Emil Sutovsky (ISR), 2651
30. Rafael Vaganian (ARM), 2650
31. Xu Jun (CHN), 2646
32. Vladislav Tkachiev (FRA), 2642
33. Sergei Rublevsky (RUS), 2639
34. Vadim Zvjaginsev (RUS), 2638
35. Mikhail Gurevich (BEL), 2633
36. Francisco Vallejo Pons (ESP), 2630
37. Rustem Dautov (GER), 2630
38. Konstantin Sakaev (RUS), 2630
39. Aleksander Delchev (BUL), 2629
40. Alexander Lastin (RUS), 2628
41. Alexander Motylev (RUS), 2627
42. Sergei Movsesian (CZE), 2627
43. Jaan Ehlvest (EST), 2627
44. Sergei Shipov (RUS), 2625
45. Viktor Korchnoi (SUI), 2624
46. Sergei Tiviakov (NED), 2618
47. Vadim Milov (SUI), 2614
48. Gilberto Milos (BRA), 2614
49. Evgeny Pigusov (RUS), 2613
50. Alexander Graf (GER), 2610
51. Liviu-Dieter Nisipeanu (ROM), 2609
52. Smbat Lputian (ARM), 2608
53. Gregory Kaidanov (USA), 2605
54. Thomas Luther (GER), 2604
55. Karen Asrian (ARM), 2604
56. Zoltan Gyimesi (HUN), 2602
57. Boris Gulko (USA), 2602
58. Pavel Kotsur (KAZ), 2600
59. Vladimir Baklan (UKR), 2599
60. Alexei Fedorov (BLR), 2599
61. Boris Avrukh (ISR), 2598
62. Vereslav Eingorn (UKR), 2598
63. Mikhail Kobalia (RUS), 2595
64. Alexander Goldin (USA), 2594
65. Peter Heine Nielsen (DEN), 2593
66. Konstantin Aseev (RUS), 2591
67. Krishnan Sasikiran (IND), 2589
68. Bartłomiej Macieja (POL), 2588
69. Ashot Anastasian (ARM), 2588
70. Joel Benjamin (USA), 2587
71. Leinier Domínguez (CUB), 2585
72. Giovanni Vescovi (BRA), 2581
73. Stuart Conquest (ENG), 2580
74. Igor Khenkin (GER), 2579
75. Sergey Volkov (RUS), 2578
76. Alexander Shabalov (USA), 2574
77. Michał Krasenkow (POL), 2573
78. Lázaro Bruzón (CUB), 2573
79. Šarūnas Šulskis (LTU), 2573
80. Alexander Ivanov (USA), 2573
81. Đào Thiên Hải (VIE), 2572
82. Alex Yermolinsky (USA), 2571
83. Larry Christiansen (USA), 2570
84. Lev Psakhis (ISR), 2566
85. Alexandre Lesiège (CAN), 2564
86. Teimour Radjabov (AZE), 2558
87. Vadim Malakhatko (UKR), 2557
88. Liang Chong (CHN), 2556, IM
89. Ognjen Cvitan (CRO), 2555
90. Georgy Timoshenko (UKR), 2554
91. Andrei Volokitin (UKR), 2551, IM
92. Dmitry Gurevich (USA), 2550
93. Stanislav Savchenko (UKR), 2549
94. Dorian Rogozenko (ROM), 2548
95. Jacek Gdański (POL), 2537
96. Nguyễn Anh Dũng (VIE), 2533
97. Hichem Hamdouchi (MAR), 2533
98. Suat Atalık (BIH), 2532
99. Slim Belkhodja (TUN), 2531, IM
100. Alonso Zapata (COL), 2530
101. Shukhrat Safin (UZB), 2529
102. Igor Nataf (FRA), 2527
103. Pendyala Harikrishna (IND), 2522
104. Yu Shaoteng (CHN), 2517, IM
105. Ehsan Ghaem-Maghami (IRI), 2509
106. Saidali Iuldachev (UZB), 2508
107. Daniel Cámpora (ARG), 2506
108. Dibyendu Barua (IND), 2499
109. Alexei Barsov (UZB), 2495
110. Li Wenliang (CHN), 2494, IM
111. Mohamad Al-Modiahki (QAT), 2492
112. Khvicha Supatashvili (GEO), 2487, IM
113. Zhang Pengxiang (CHN), 2487
114. Alejandro Hoffman (ARG), 2481
115. Fouad El Taher (EGY), 2477, IM
116. Rubén Felgaer (ARG), 2471, IM
117. Surya Shekhar Ganguly (IND), 2464, IM
118. Amon Simutowe (ZAM), 2462, IM
119. Nikolai Vlassov (RUS), 2461, IM
120. Aimen Rizouk (ALG), 2442, IM
121. Facundo Pierrot (ARG), 2425, IM
122. Alexis Cabrera (CUB), 2415, IM
123. Mikhail Gluzman (AUS), 2400, IM
124. Watu Kobese (RSA), 2373, IM
125. Baatr Shovunov (RUS), 2348, IM
126. Nugzar Zeliakov (RUS), unrated, no title
127. Gaetan Sarthou (FRA), 2357, FM
128. Olivier Touzane (FRA), 2382, IM

== Qualification ==
Players qualified for the championship according to the following criteria:

1. four semi-finalists of the previous championship (Viswanathan Anand, Alexei Shirov, Michael Adams, Alexander Grischuk);
2. the World Junior Champion 2000 (Lázaro Bruzón);
3. 20 best rated players (the average of July 2000 and January 2001 rating lists was used);
4. 90 qualifiers from the continental championships;
5. eight qualifiers from the Internet championship;
6. five nominees of the FIDE President.

== Schedule ==
There was one rest day during round 4 and two rest days during round 6. The tie-breaks of rounds 1–5 were played in the evening following the second game. The final took place one month after rounds 1–6.

- Round 1: 27 November 2001, 28 November 2001 (tiebreaks on 28 November 2001)
- Round 2: 29 November 2001, 30 November 2001 (tiebreaks on 30 November 2001)
- Round 3: 1 December 2001, 2 December 2001 (tiebreaks on 2 December 2001)
- Round 4: 3 December 2001, 5 December 2001 (tiebreaks on 5 December 2001)
- Round 5: 6 December 2001, 7 December 2001 (tiebreaks on 7 December 2001)
- Round 6: 8 December 2001, 10 December 2001, 11 December 2001, 13 December 2001 (tiebreaks on 14 December 2001)
- Round 7: 16 January 2002 – 24 January 2002, with a rest day on 20 January 2002 (tiebreaks on 25 January 2002)

== Results, rounds 1–4 ==
=== Section 1 ===
First round
1	(India) Viswanathan Anand	2½
128	(France) Olivier Touzane	1½
64	(United States) Alexander Goldin	½
65	(Denmark) Peter Heine Nielsen	1½
32	(France) Vladislav Tkachiev	3
97	(Morocco) Hichem Hamdouchi	1
33	(Russia) Sergei Rublevsky	1
96	(Vietnam) Nguyễn Anh Dũng	3
16	(Russia) Anatoly Karpov	1
113	(China) Zhang Pengxiang	3
49	(Russia) Evgeny Pigusov	1½
80	(United States) Alexander Ivanov	½
17	(Russia) Alexey Dreev	1½
112	(Georgia (country)) Khvicha Supatashvili	½
48	(Brazil) Gilberto Milos	1½
81	(Vietnam) Đào Thiên Hải	½

Second round
1	(India) Viswanathan Anand	1½
65	(Denmark) Peter Heine Nielsen	½
32	(France) Vladislav Tkachiev	1½
96	(Vietnam) Nguyễn Anh Dũng	½
113	(China) Zhang Pengxiang	0
49	(Russia) Evgeny Pigusov	2
17	(Russia) Alexey Dreev	1½
48	(Brazil) Gilberto Milos	½

Third round
1	(India) Viswanathan Anand	2½
32	(France) Vladislav Tkachiev	1½
49	(Russia) Evgeny Pigusov	½
17	(Russia) Alexey Dreev	1½

Fourth round
1	(India) Viswanathan Anand	1½
17	(Russia) Alexey Dreev	½

=== Section 2 ===
First round
8	(Bulgaria) Veselin Topalov	2
121	(Argentina) Facundo Pierrot	0
57	(United States) Boris Gulko	½
72	(Brazil) Giovanni Vescovi	1½
25	(China) Zhang Zhong	3
104	(China) Yu Shaoteng	1
40	(Russia) Alexander Lastin	1½
89	(Croatia) Ognjen Cvitan	½
9	(Spain) Alexei Shirov	2
120	(Algeria) Aimen Rizouk	0
56	(Hungary) Zoltan Gyimesi	4
73	(England) Stuart Conquest	3
24	(Russia) Alexander Grischuk	1½
105	(Iran) Ehsan Ghaem-Maghami	½
41	(Russia) Alexander Motylev	1½
88	(China) Liang Chong	½

Second round
8	(Bulgaria) Veselin Topalov	1½
72	(Brazil) Giovanni Vescovi	½
25	(China) Zhong Zhang	1½
40	(Russia) Alexander Lastin	½
9	(Spain) Alexei Shirov	1½
56	(Hungary) Zoltan Gyimesi	½
24	(Russia) Alexander Grischuk	½
41	(Russia) Alexander Motylev	1½

Third round
8	(Bulgaria) Veselin Topalov	1½
25	(China) Zhong Zhang	½
9	(Spain) Alexei Shirov	3½
41	(Russia) Alexander Motylev	2½

Fourth round
8	(Bulgaria) Veselin Topalov	3
9	(Spain) Alexei Shirov	4

=== Section 3 ===
First round
4	(Ukraine) Vasyl Ivanchuk	1½
125	(Russia) Baatr Shovunov	½
61	(Israel) Boris Avrukh	0
68	(Poland) Bartłomiej Macieja	2
29	(Israel) Emil Sutovsky	4
100	(Colombia) Alonso Zapata	3
36	(Spain) Francisco Vallejo Pons	2½
93	(Ukraine) Stanislav Savchenko	1½
13	(Netherlands) Loek van Wely	1½
116	(Argentina) Rubén Felgaer	½
52	(Armenia) Smbat Lputian	2
77	(Poland) Michał Krasenkow	0
20	(China) Ye Jiangchuan	3
109	(Uzbekistan) Alexei Barsov	1
45	(Switzerland) Viktor Korchnoi	1½
84	(Israel) Lev Psakhis	2½

Second round
4	(Ukraine) Vasyl Ivanchuk	3
68	(Poland) Bartłomiej Macieja	1
29	(Israel) Emil Sutovsky	2
36	(Spain) Francisco Vallejo Pons	0
13	(Netherlands) Loek van Wely	2
52	(Armenia) Smbat Lputian	0
20	(China) Ye Jiangchuan	2½
84	(Israel) Lev Psakhis	1½

Third round
4	(Ukraine) Vasyl Ivanchuk	1½
29	(Israel) Emil Sutovsky	½
13	(Netherlands) Loek van Wely	½
20	(China) Ye Jiangchuan	1½

Fourth round
4	(Ukraine) Vasyl Ivanchuk	1½
20	(China) Ye Jiangchuan	½

=== Section 4 ===
First round
5	(Hungary) Peter Leko	3
124	(South Africa) Watu Kobese	1
60	(Belarus) Alexei Fedorov	½
69	(Armenia) Ashot Anastasian	1½
28	(Bosnia and Herzegovina) Predrag Nikolić	1½
101	(Uzbekistan) Shukhrat Safin	½
37	(Germany) Rustem Dautov	1½
92	(United States) Dmitry Gurevich	½
12	(Russia) Alexander Khalifman	3
117	(India) Surya Shekhar Ganguly	1
53	(United States) Gregory Kaidanov	½
76	(United States) Alexander Shabalov	1½
21	(France) Joël Lautier	2
108	(India) Dibyendu Barua	0
44	(Russia) Sergei Shipov	1½
85	(Canada) Alexandre Lesiège	½

Second round
5	(Hungary) Peter Leko	1½
69	(Armenia) Ashot Anastasian	2½
28	(Bosnia and Herzegovina) Predrag Nikolić	2½
37	(Germany) Rustem Dautov	1½
12	(Russia) Alexander Khalifman	3
76	(United States) Alexander Shabalov	1
21	(France) Joël Lautier	2½
44	(Russia) Sergei Shipov	1½

Third round
69	(Armenia) Ashot Anastasian	½
28	(Bosnia and Herzegovina) Predrag Nikolić	1½
12	(Russia) Alexander Khalifman	1
21	(France) Joël Lautier	3

Fourth round
28	(Bosnia and Herzegovina) Predrag Nikolić	1
21	(France) Joël Lautier	3

=== Section 5 ===
First round
2	(England) Michael Adams	2
127	(France) Gaetan Sarthou	0
63	(Russia) Mikhail Kobalia	3
66	(Russia) Konstantin Aseev	1
31	(China) Xu Jun	1½
98	(Bosnia and Herzegovina) Suat Atalık	½
34	(Russia) Vadim Zvjaginsev	1½
95	(Poland) Jacek Gdański	½
15	(Russia) Peter Svidler	1½
114	(Argentina) Alejandro Hoffman	½
50	(Germany) Alexander Graf	1
79	(Lithuania) Šarūnas Šulskis	3
18	(Hungary) Judit Polgár	2
111	(Qatar) Mohamad Al-Modiahki	0
47	(Switzerland) Vadim Milov	3½
82	(United States) Alex Yermolinsky	2½

Second round
2	(England) Michael Adams	1½
63	(Russia) Mikhail Kobalia	½
31	(China) Xu Jun	½
34	(Russia) Vadim Zvjaginsev	1½
15	(Russia) Peter Svidler	2½
79	(Lithuania) Šarūnas Šulskis	1½
18	(Hungary) Judit Polgár	1½
47	(Switzerland) Vadim Milov	2½

Third round
2	(England) Michael Adams	3
34	(Russia) Vadim Zvjaginsev	1
15	(Russia) Peter Svidler	2
47	(Switzerland) Vadim Milov	0

Fourth round
2	(England) Michael Adams	2½
15	(Russia) Peter Svidler	3½

=== Section 6 ===
First round
7	(Israel) Boris Gelfand	1½
122	(Cuba) Alexis Cabrera	½
58	(Kazakhstan) Pavel Kotsur	1½
71	(Cuba) Leinier Domínguez	2½
26	(Slovenia) Alexander Beliavsky	1½
103	(India) Pendyala Harikrishna	½
39	(Bulgaria) Aleksander Delchev	1½
90	(Ukraine) Georgy Timoshenko	½
10	(Uzbekistan) Rustam Kasimdzhanov	1½
119	(Russia) Nikolai Vlassov	½
55	(Armenia) Karen Asrian	2½
74	(Germany) Igor Khenkin	3½
23	(Georgia (country)) Zurab Azmaiparashvili	1½
106	(Uzbekistan) Saidali Iuldachev	½
42	(Czech Republic) Sergei Movsesian	2½
87	(Ukraine) Vadim Malakhatko	1½

Second round
7	(Israel) Boris Gelfand	1½
71	(Cuba) Leinier Domínguez	½
26	(Slovenia) Alexander Beliavsky	1½
39	(Bulgaria) Aleksander Delchev	2½
10	(Uzbekistan) Rustam Kasimdzhanov	2½
74	(Germany) Igor Khenkin	1½
23	(Georgia (country)) Zurab Azmaiparashvili	2½
42	(Czech Republic) Sergei Movsesian	1½

Third round
7	(Israel) Boris Gelfand	2
39	(Bulgaria) Aleksander Delchev	0
10	(Uzbekistan) Rustam Kasimdzhanov	1½
23	(Georgia (country)) Zurab Azmaiparashvili	2½

Fourth round
7	(Israel) Boris Gelfand	3½
23	(Georgia (country)) Zurab Azmaiparashvili	2½

=== Section 7 ===
First round
3	(Russia) Alexander Morozevich	1½
126	(Russia) Nugzar Zeliakov	½
62	(Ukraine) Vereslav Eingorn	1½
67	(India) Krishnan Sasikiran	2½
30	(Armenia) Rafael Vaganian	1½
99	(Tunisia) Slim Belkhodja	½
35	(Belgium) Mikhail Gurevich	1½
94	(Romania) Dorian Rogozenko	½
14	(Bulgaria) Kiril Georgiev	3
115	(Egypt) Fouad El Taher	1
51	(Romania) Liviu-Dieter Nisipeanu	3
78	(Cuba) Lázaro Bruzón	4
19	(Ukraine) Ruslan Ponomariov	1½
110	(China) Li Wenliang	½
46	(Netherlands) Sergei Tiviakov	3
83	(United States) Larry Christiansen	1

Second round
3	(Russia) Alexander Morozevich	1½
67	(India) Krishnan Sasikiran	½
30	(Armenia) Rafael Vaganian	1½
35	(Belgium) Mikhail Gurevich	2½
14	(Bulgaria) Kiril Georgiev	3
78	(Cuba) Lázaro Bruzón	1
19	(Ukraine) Ruslan Ponomariov	3
46	(Netherlands) Sergei Tiviakov	1

Third round
3	(Russia) Alexander Morozevich	1½
35	(Belgium) Mikhail Gurevich	½
14	(Bulgaria) Kiril Georgiev	0
19	(Ukraine) Ruslan Ponomariov	2

Fourth round
3	(Russia) Alexander Morozevich	1½
19	(Ukraine) Ruslan Ponomariov	2½

=== Section 8 ===
First round
6	(Russia) Evgeny Bareev	2
123	(Australia) Mikhail Gluzman	0
59	(Ukraine) Vladimir Baklan	3½
70	(United States) Joel Benjamin	2½
27	(Moldova) Viktor Bologan	½
102	(France) Igor Nataf	1½
38	(Russia) Konstantin Sakaev	3½
91	(Ukraine) Andrei Volokitin	2½
11	(Israel) Ilya Smirin	2
118	(Zambia) Amon Simutowe	0
54	(Germany) Thomas Luther	3
75	(Russia) Sergey Volkov	1
22	(England) Nigel Short	½
107	(Argentina) Daniel Cámpora	1½
43	(Estonia) Jaan Ehlvest	3½
86	(Azerbaijan) Teimour Radjabov	2½

Second round
6	(Russia) Evgeny Bareev	1½
59	(Ukraine) Vladimir Baklan	½
102	(France) Igor Nataf	½
38	(Russia) Konstantin Sakaev	1½
11	(Israel) Ilya Smirin	1½
54	(Germany) Thomas Luther	½
107	(Argentina) Daniel Cámpora	½
43	(Estonia) Jaan Ehlvest	1½

Third round
6	(Russia) Evgeny Bareev	3
38	(Russia) Konstantin Sakaev	1
11	(Israel) Ilya Smirin	3
43	(Estonia) Jaan Ehlvest	4

Fourth round
6	(Russia) Evgeny Bareev	2
43	(Estonia) Jaan Ehlvest	0

== Results, rounds 5–7 ==
Quarterfinals (best of 2)
1	(India) Viswanathan Anand	1	½	1½
9	(Spain) Alexei Shirov	0	½	½
4	(Ukraine) Vasyl Ivanchuk	½	½	2½	3½
21	(France) Joël Lautier	½	½	1½	2½
15	(Russia) Peter Svidler	½	½	2½	3½
7	(Israel) Boris Gelfand	½	½	1½	2½
19	(Ukraine) Ruslan Ponomariov	½	½	2	3
6	(Russia) Evgeny Bareev	½	½	0	1

Semifinals (best of 4)
1	(India) Viswanathan Anand	½	½	½	0	1½
4	(Ukraine) Vasyl Ivanchuk	½	½	½	1	2½
15	(Russia) Peter Svidler	½	½	0	½	1½
19	(Ukraine) Ruslan Ponomariov	½	½	1	½	2½

Final (best of 8)
4	(Ukraine) Vasyl Ivanchuk	0	½	½	½	0	½	½	2½
19	(Ukraine) Ruslan Ponomariov	1	½	½	½	1	½	½	4½

== Championship final ==
World Chess Championship Final 2002
	Rating	1	2	3	4	5	6	7	Points
Ruslan Ponomariov (Ukraine)	2684	1	½	½	½	1	½	½	4½
Vasyl Ivanchuk (Ukraine)	2731	0	½	½	½	0	½	½	2½
