= Gluzman =

Gluzman is a surname shared by several notable people:

- Mikhail Gluzman (born 1967), Ukrainian-Australian chess International Master
- Rita Gluzman (born 1948), Ukrainian-American activist and convicted murderer
- Semen Gluzman (1946–2026), Ukrainian psychiatrist
- Vadim Gluzman (born 1973), Ukrainian-born Israeli classical violinist
