= CCLA =

CCLA may refer to:

- California Collegiate Lacrosse Association, a conference that participates in the Men's Collegiate Lacrosse Association
- Canadian Civil Liberties Association, a non-governmental organization in Canada
- Canadian Copyright Licensing Agency, a Canadian business corporation
- Chimpanzee–human last common ancestor, also CHLCA or C/H LCA
- Correspondence Chess League of America, the first American chess club to become an ICCF affiliate
- Correspondence Chess League of Australia, the league that organizes the Australian Correspondence Chess Championship
- Cross-Community Labour Alternative, a left-wing political party in Northern Ireland
