= Australasian Masters =

Annual chess tournament held in Melbourne

The Australian Masters is a chess tournament that has been held in Melbourne, Australia, annually since 1987. The tournament is an invitational event, normally run as a 10-player round-robin tournament. Since 2013 the tournament has become Australia's only round-robin Grandmaster tournament. A major sponsor of the tournament since its inception has been Eddy Levi (or his company Hallsten).

== Winners ==
- 1987 Darryl Johansen
- 1989 Stephen Solomon Guy West
- 1990 Stephen Solomon
- 1991 Stephen Solomon
- 1992 Tony Miles
- 1993 Michael Gluzman
- 1994 Leonid Sandler
- 1995 Tu Hoang Thong
- 1996 Nguyen Anh Dung
- 1997 Stephen Solomon
- 1998 Chris Depasquale
- 1999 Gary Lane
- 2000 Adam Hunt
- 2001 Guy West Darryl Johansen
- 2002 Guy West Michael Gluzman
- 2003 Stephen Solomon
- 2004 David Smerdon Darryl Johansen
- 2005 Jesse Noel Sales
- 2006 George Xie
- 2008 Vladimir Smirnov
- 2009 Stephen Solomon
- 2010 Stephen Solomon
- 2011 James Morris
- 2012 Anton Smirnov, Bobby Cheng, James Morris
- 2013 Normunds Miezis and Vasily Papin
- 2014 Vasily Papin, Rustam Khuznutdinov and Murtas Kazhgaleyev
- 2015 Kanan Izzat
- 2016 Anton Smirnov
- 2017 Vasily Papin, Adrien Demuth
- 2018 Anton Smirnov

== IM and GM norms ==
Since 2013, Grandmaster norms for performances above the 2600 level, have been available at the Australian Masters Championship thanks to the participation of foreign Grandmasters. International Master norms are also available at the Australian Masters tournament.

== See also ==
- Chess in Australia
