= Jacek Gdański =

Polish chess grandmaster (born 1970)

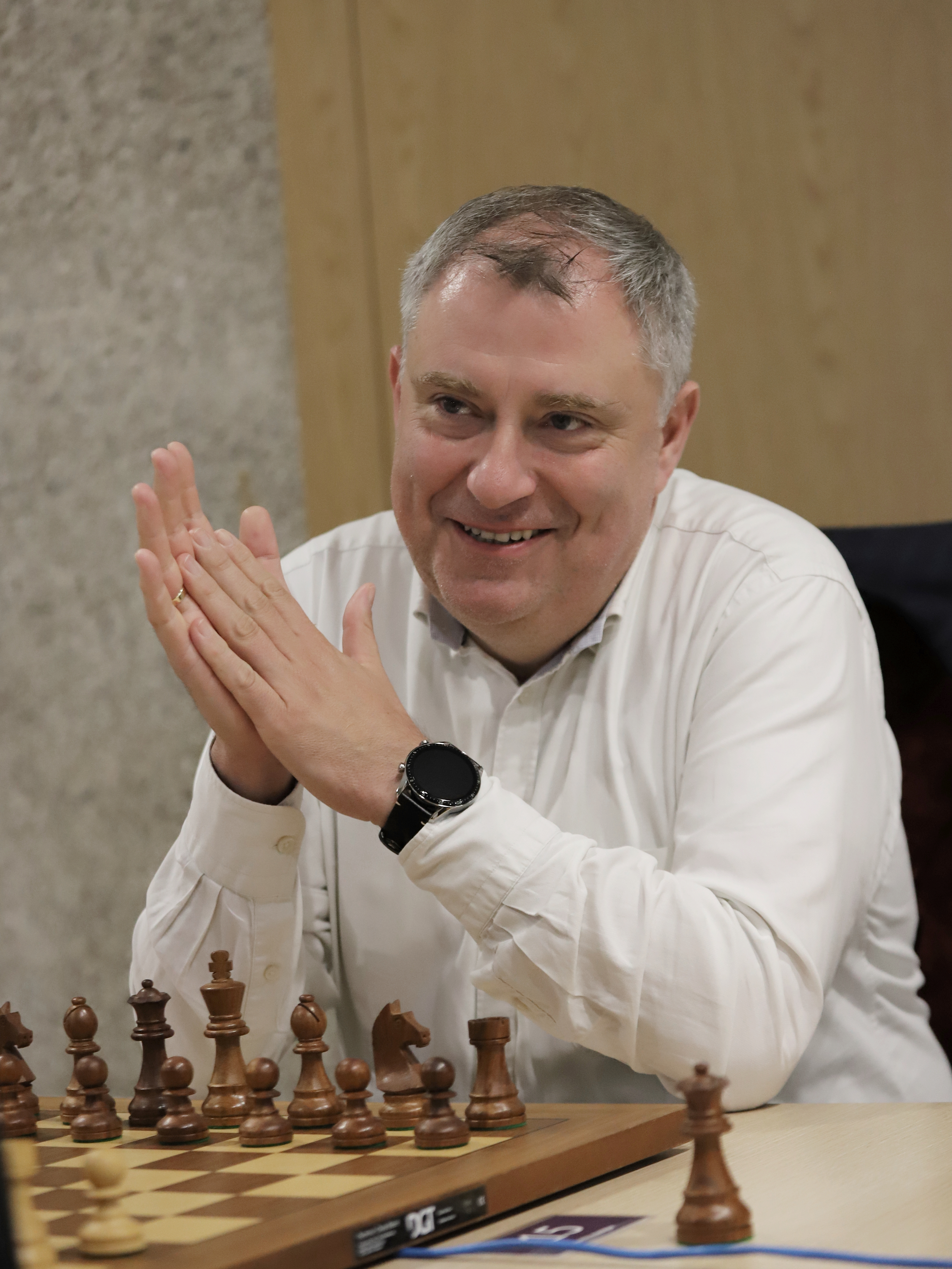
- Gdański in 2021

Personal information
- Born: 30 November 1970 (age 55) Szczecinek, Poland

Chess career
- Country: Poland
- Title: Grandmaster (1997)
- FIDE rating: 2478 (July 2026)
- Peak rating: 2557 (July 2000)

Jacek Gdański (born 30 November 1970) is a Polish chess player who won the Polish Chess Championship in 1992. FIDE Grandmaster (1997).

== Chess career ==
In the second half of the 1980s Jacek Gdański was a leading Polish chess junior. In 1986 he won the Polish Junior Chess Championship (U-20) and the bronze medal in European Junior Chess Championship. In 1989 Jacek Gdański won the silver medal in the World Junior Chess Championship.

Many times played in the Polish Chess Championship's finals. He won one gold (1992), and two bronze (1997 - he came third in the playoff, 2010) medals. Twice he won the Polish Fast Chess Championship (1995, 2000) and the Polish Blitz Championship (1998, 2000). In Polish Team Chess Championships Jacek Gdański won eight medals: nine gold (1996, 2000, 2001, 2002, 2003, 2004, 2007, 2008, 2010), seven silver (1990, 1992, 1993, 1997, 2009, 2011, 2012) and bronze (1995). He was awarded the International Master title in 1988 and Grandmaster title in 1997.

He won or shared first place in the international chess tournaments: in "Cracovia" (Kraków) (1993, 1994), in Helsinki and Rio de Janeiro (1999). In 2001 Jacek Gdański qualified for the FIDE World Chess Championship by knockout system in Moscow, where he lost in the first round to Vadim Zvjaginsev.

Jacek Gdański played for Poland in Chess Olympiads:

- In 1990, at second reserve board in the 29th Chess Olympiad in Novi Sad (+5, =4, -1),
- In 1992, at third board in the 30th Chess Olympiad in Manila (+3, =6, -2),
- In 1994, at third board in the 31st Chess Olympiad in Moscow (+5, =4, -2).

Jacek Gdański played for Poland and Poland Goldies (2013) in European Team Chess Championship:

- In 1989, at first reserve board in the 9th European Team Chess Championship in Haifa (+3, =5, -0),
- In 1992, at third board in the 10th European Team Chess Championship in Debrecen (+3, =0, -5),
- In 2013, at fourth board in the 19th European Team Chess Championship in Warsaw (+2, =3, -4).

== Personal life ==
Jacek Gdański successfully combined playing chess at a high level with completing studies at the University of Gdańsk and the National School of Public Administration. In 2004-2009 he was a member of the Poland National Health Fund. Since 2009 he working in the Ministry of Finance.
