= Gary Benson =

Gary Benson may refer to:

- Gary Benson (poker player) (born 1957), poker player and sports bettor
- Gary Benson (musician), English singer-songwriter
- Gary Benson, inventor and named respondent in the 1972 U.S. Supreme Court patent case Gottschalk v. Benson
