= Rustem Dautov =

German chess grandmaster (born 1965)

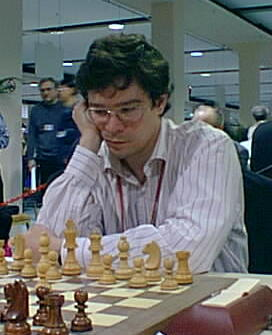

Personal information
- Born: Rustem Hazitovich Dautov; 28 November 1965 (age 60) Ufa, USSR

Chess career
- Country: Germany
- Title: Grandmaster (1990)
- FIDE rating: 2525 (October 2026)
- Peak rating: 2636 (January 2002)
- Peak ranking: No. 26 (July 1994)

Rustem Hazitovich Dautov (Рустем Хазитович Даутов, born 28 November 1965 in Ufa) is a German chess player of Tatar origin who holds the FIDE title of Grandmaster.

== Career ==
In 1983, Dautov won the USSR U18 youth championship and in 1986 the Belarusian Chess Championship. He completed his military service in the 1980s in the sports department of the Soviet army, which was stationed in East Germany. In this period he participated in various GDR tournaments: in 1984, he was second (after Valery Chekhov) in Berlin. Tournament victories include Dresden in 1986, Rostock, Halle and Dresden in 1987, and Minsk and Dresden in 1988. In 1989 he was awarded the FIDE title of International Master (IM). In 1990, he won in Münster and was awarded the Grandmaster (GM) title. The following year, he won tournaments in Porz and Bad Lauterberg.

In 1992, Dautov settled in Seeheim-Jugenheim. Since 1996 he plays for the German national team. Between 1996 and 2004, he took part in five Chess Olympiads. His biggest success was in 2000 at the 34th Chess Olympiad in Istanbul, where he and his team got the silver medal (Russia scored gold). Dautov also scored two individual bronze medals, one for his rating performance of 2788 and one for his 8.5/11 score on the third board.

In 1996, Dautov won (jointly with Artur Yusupov) the international German Chess Championship, he finished second in the championship of 1999. In the late 1990s he won tournaments in Bad Homburg (1997), Seefeld (1997), Essen (1999) (shared with Vadim Zvjaginsev, Emil Sutovsky and Larry Christiansen) and Deizisau 2002 (amongst others shared with Vladimir Epishin and Levon Aronian). He participated in the FIDE World Chess Championship 2002 and the FIDE World Chess Championship 2004, where he was knocked out in the second and first round respectively.

Dautov took on professional poker in recent years and cut down on his chess-playing activities. However, he still plays regularly in the German Chess Bundesliga for OSC Baden-Baden and the Swiss National League A for chess club Lucerne. He has written numerous articles for New in Chess and authored a Chessbase DVD 'Queen's gambit with 5.Bf4'.

Since the season 2016/17, Dautov plays for the team of SF Deizisau in the Second Chess Bundesliga.
