= Zhang Pengxiang =

Chinese chess grandmaster (born 1980)

Personal information
- Born: 29 June 1980 (age 46) Tianjin, China

Chess career
- Country: China
- Title: Grandmaster (2001)
- FIDE rating: 2557 (July 2026)
- Peak rating: 2657 (April 2007)
- Peak ranking: No. 47 (April 2007)

Zhang Pengxiang (simplified Chinese: 张鹏翔; traditional Chinese: 張鵬翔; pinyin: Zhāng Péngxiáng; born 29 June 1980 in Tianjin) is a Chinese chess grandmaster, and the 2007 Asian Chess Champion. In 2001, he became China's 12th Grandmaster. Zhang's peak rating was 2657 in April 2007 when he was ranked 47th in the world.

He has stated his desire to teach and give training to youngsters in China via an online classroom network. He lives in Beijing.

== Career ==
Zhang learned to play chess when he was 5 years old, and at the age of six he started to play in chess competitions at school. He became national youth champion in 1992 and 1993.

He became a FIDE Master in 1996 and an International Master in 1998. He was national junior champion in 1999.

He was the runner-up at the 1998 Chinese national men's chess championships. He has been a Grandmaster (GM) since August 2001, when he achieved his last norm at the Asian Continental Championships - won by Xu Jun - in Kolkata where he came fourth with 7.5/11. Earlier that month, he won the Zhong Hong Real Estate Cup in Beijing with 8/11.

In November 2001, he upset former world champion Anatoly Karpov (who had an Elo rating 162 points higher) in the first round at the FIDE World Chess Championships in Moscow. Zhang, ranked 113th in the world at the time, held Karpov to two draws in regular matches and forced him into the two tie-breaks. In the first rapid play tie-breaker Zhang won the first game (Slav Defense) where he mounted a stiff opposition as black that eventually Karpov ran out of time in a roughly equal position. In the second tie-breaker (reverse colors), Karpov resigned as Black in 45 moves in a Giuoco Piano. Zhang won 3–1 overall.

After that encounter with Karpov, Zhang said he had prepared for two months before the game in case he met him. "I wanted to draw the first two games and to play the tie-breaks. My idea was to avoid the exchange of pieces to preserve my chances and to maintain tension in the game," Zhang said. "I took the upper hand in the second tie-breaker. He used up his time and had to give up." These tactics proved to be a brilliant success against the 48-year-old Karpov, who had already conceded victory to Zhang four years before at an exhibition game in China. Zhang also said "He is my idol," and "I told myself during the game not to play softly just because of my admiration for him." Zhang has said he had been an admirer of the Russian grandmaster since he was five years old. "It is still fresh in my memory that I read a chess book of Karpov by chance in 1985 which I liked very much," the 21-year-old said. "It lifted me to a higher level." "I was happy that I took on him in the first round." Zhang moved on to the next round to play Evgeny Pigusov of Russia but got whitewashed 2–0.

In February 2002, Zhang came joint second with 6/8 (joint fourth on tie-break) at the 2nd Trignac International Tournament in France. In March 2002 he won the 9th 'Anilbal' International Open in Linares with 8/10. Also later in March 2002, he came second at the 25th Ciudad de San Sebastian with 5.5/8 after the winner Yu Shaoteng. In September 2002 he also became the Chinese national champion for the first time in Qinghuangdao.

In May 2004, Zhang came second at the China Men's Team Championship with 8/10. In August–September 2004, he won the 6th Sants Hostafrancs A-Open with 8.5/10 in Barcelona after play-offs. In September 2004 he won the 14th Gros Xake Taldea International Open in San Sebastian, and in October 2004, won the Essent Open in Hoogeveen with 7/9. In December 2004, he came fourth with 6.0/9 at the Singapore Masters.

In February 2005, Zhang won the Festival International des Jeux in Cannes with an almost perfect score of 8.5/9. In March 2005, he won the International Chess Festival in Bad Wörishofen with a score of 7.5/9. In May 2005, he came fourth at the Dubai Open, which was won by Wang Hao. In October 2005, he came joint second (third on tie-break) with 5/10 (2684 TPR +71) at the 2nd Samba Cup in Skanderborg.

In November 2006 Zhang won the 1st President Gloria Macapagal Arroyo Cup in Manila by finishing in clear first with 7.5 points, and in December 2006, he won the Singapore Masters.

In September 2007 he won the Asian Individual Championship ahead of second place compatriot Wang Hao in Manila. He scored 8/11 with an Elo rating performance of 2713.

In April 2008, he came a clear second at the 2nd Ruy López International Chess Festival in Mérida, Spain with a score of 5/7 and performance rating of 2772.

== National team ==
Since 1997, Zhang has been a member of the Chinese national chess team. He has competed at two Chess Olympiads in 2002 and 2006 (overall: +5, =1, -4).

In 2003, he won the individual gold medal at the 13th Asian Team Chess Championship in Jodhpur. He was also part of the 1999 team at the 12th Asian Team Chess Championship in Shenyang.

He also competed at the 2005 World Team Chess Championship in Beersheba.

== China Chess League ==
Zhang Pengxiang plays for Hebei chess club in the China Chess League (CCL).

== See also ==
- Chess in China

Preceded by Zhang Zhong	Men's Chinese Chess Champion; 2002	Succeeded by Zhang Zhong
