= Từ Hoàng Thông =

Vietnamese chess grandmaster (born 1972)

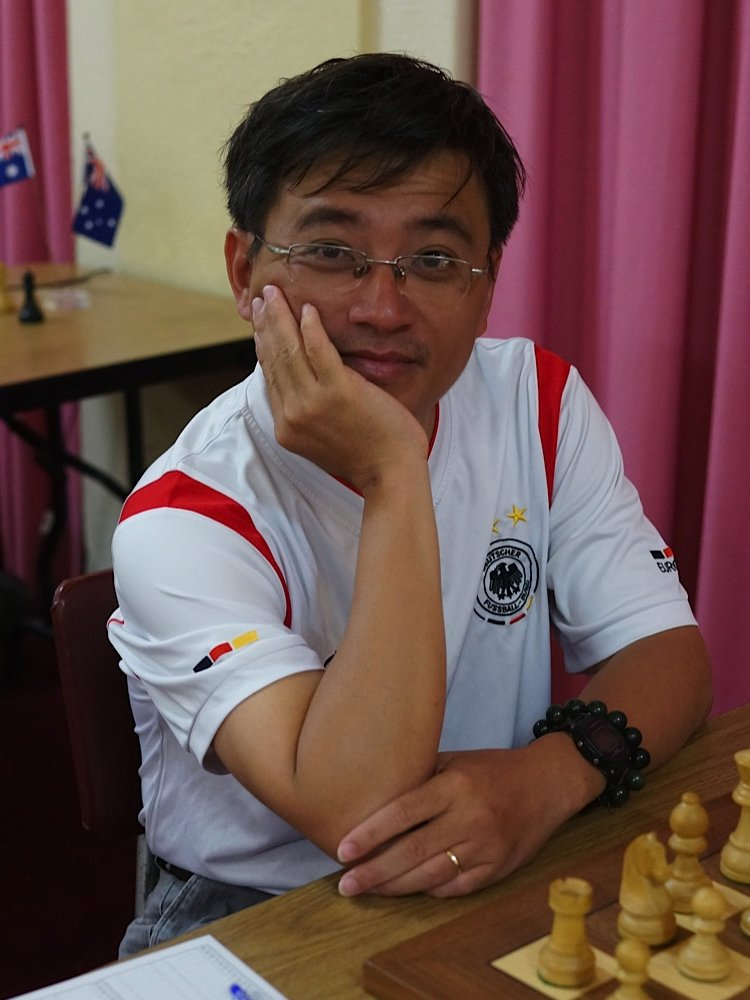
- Từ Hoàng Thông at the Australasian Masters GM tournament in Melbourne 2013.

Personal information
- Born: 22 June 1972 (age 54)

Chess career
- Country: Vietnam
- Title: Grandmaster (1999)
- Peak rating: 2515 (July 1999)

Từ Hoàng Thông (born 22 June 1972) is a Vietnamese chess player. He was awarded the title of Grandmaster by FIDE in 1999. Từ is a six-time national champion.

== Early life ==
Từ Hoàng Thông began studying chess when he was nine years old, at the Children's Cultural House in Ho Chi Minh City, and began playing in youth tournaments the following year. He scored a draw against the Women's World Chess Champion Maya Chiburdanidze while on a Vietnamese - Soviet youth exchange in 1983.

== Chess career ==
Từ Hoàng Thông first won the Vietnamese Chess Championship in 1986 when he was 14 years old, setting the record as the youngest Vietnamese national chess champion. He successfully defended his championship title in 1987 and won again in 1991, 1998, 2000 and 2008.

He won the Asian Youth Chess Championship in Dubai 1991 and Qatar 1992. Từ won the Australian Masters IM tournament in Melbourne in 1995, ahead of Darryl Johansen, and won the Hanoi National Open in 2002.

Từ Hoàng Thông represented Vietnam in ten consecutive Chess Olympiads from 1990 to 2008. He played for Vietnam also in the Asian Team Chess Championship six times from 1991 to 2005, winning the individual bronze medal in Jodhpur 2003, and the team silver medal in Esfahan 2005. Từ was a member of the Vietnamese team that won the gold medal in the men's rapid chess team event at the 2005 Southeast Asian Games.
