= Alexis Cabrera (chess player) =

Cuban-Spanish chess grandmaster (born 1976)

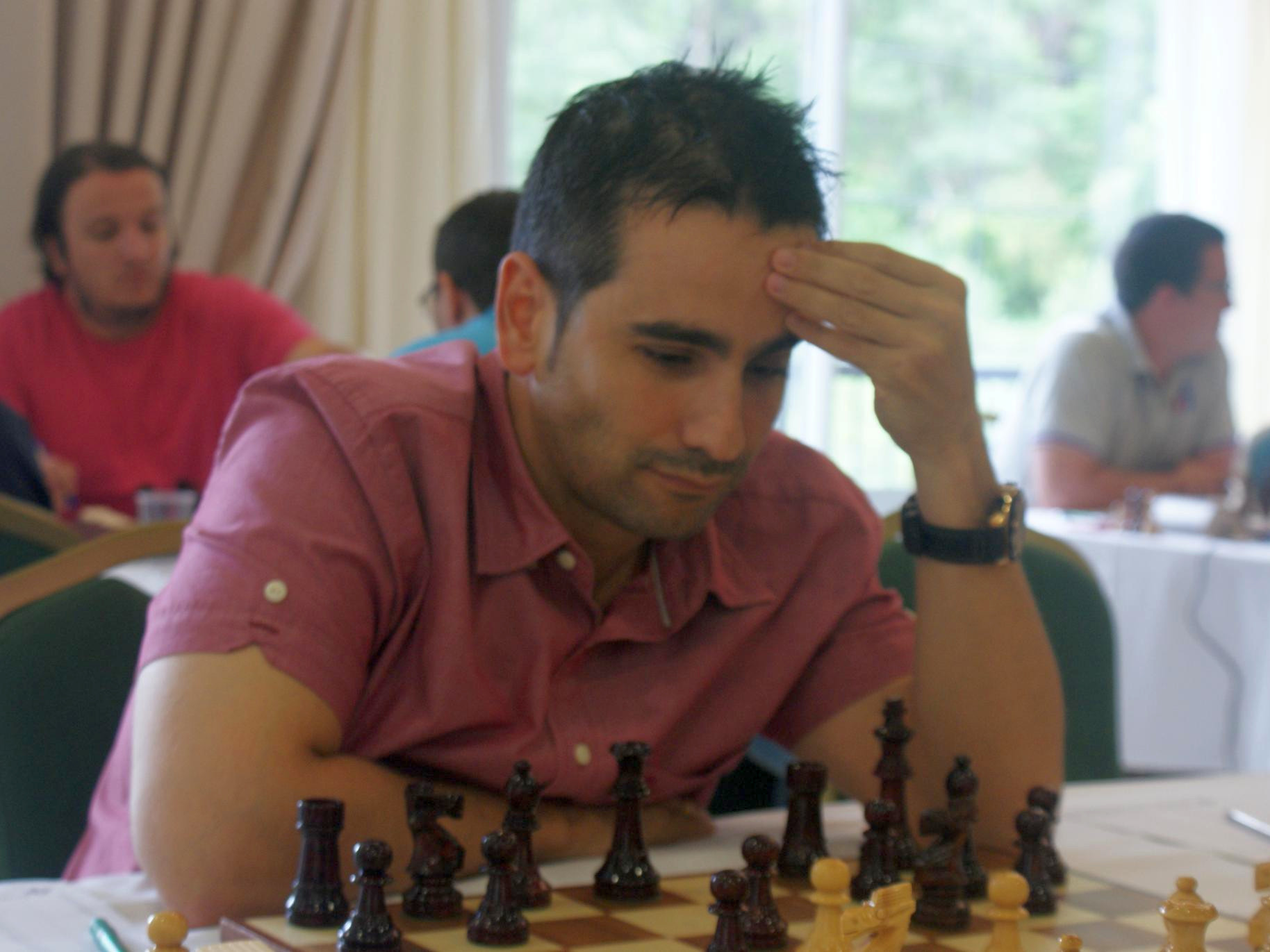

Personal information
- Born: December 25, 1976 (age 49) Matanzas, Cuba

Chess career
- Country: Cuba (until 2002); Colombia (2002–2008); Spain (since 2008)
- Title: Grandmaster (2004)
- FIDE rating: 2404 (August 2026)
- Peak rating: 2546 (May 2013)

Alexis Gianko Cabrera Pino is a Cuban-Spanish chess grandmaster.

== Chess career ==
In January 2002, he played in the FIDE World Chess Championship, where he lost 0.5-1.5 to Boris Gelfand in the first round, holding a draw as black but losing with white.

In May 2012, he won the Salou Open with a score of 7.5/9, half a point ahead of Sergey Fedorchuk.

In December 2024, he finished in third place at the Lorca International Festival Group A Open, edging out Nathan Felipe Filgueiras, Ibragim Khamrakulov, and Carlos Alberto Chavez Suarez on tiebreak scores.
