= Mikhail Gluzman =

Ukrainian-Australian chess player (born 1967)

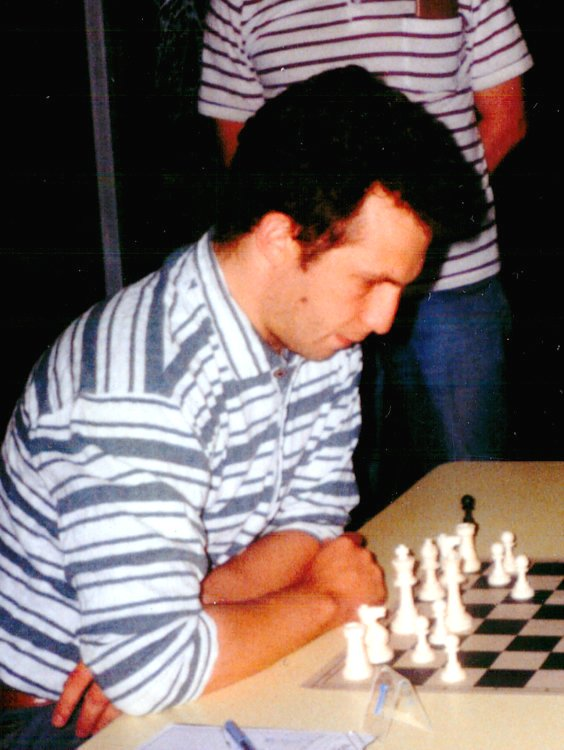
- Mikhail Gluzman at the 35th Doeberl Cup in Canberra 1997

Personal information
- Born: 5 September 1967 (age 58)

Chess career
- Country: Australia
- Title: International Master (1991)
- FIDE rating: 2403 (July 2026)
- Peak rating: 2447 (January 2000)

Mikhail Gluzman (born 5 September 1967 in Kiev, Ukraine) is a Ukrainian-Australian chess International Master and an experienced chess coach.

== Chess career ==
Gluzman gained the title of International Master in 1991, after a strong performance in the Belgrade international tournament. In 1992 he migrated to Melbourne, Australia. He finished equal first in the 1992 Victorian Chess Championship, but lost the play-off match to GM Darryl Johansen.

Gluzman won the Australian Masters chess tournament in 1993 and, jointly with Guy West, in 2002. He also won the 36th Doeberl Cup in 1998, on a tie-break from GM Darryl Johansen.

He represented Australia in two Chess Olympiads in Moscow in 1994 and Bled in 2002.

Gluzman won the Oceania Zonal Chess Championship held on the Gold Coast, Queensland in April 2001, after finishing equal first with Mark Champan on a score of 7/9, and then winning a rapid play-off match. He went on to compete in the knock-out format FIDE World Chess Championship 2002 in Moscow, Russia where he was eliminated in round 1 by Evgeny Bareev.

In 1994 Gluzman co-founded "Chess Ideas", Australia's first professional chess coaching business, in Melbourne, Australia. He successfully coached World Youth Chess Championship participants Denis Bourmistrov to finish =10th in the Boy's Under 10 Chess Championship in Menorca 1996, and Michelle Lee to finish =6th in the Girl's Under 10 Chess Championship in Oropesa del Mar 2000.

Gluzman retired from tournament play in 2003, citing the low profile of chess and the lack of opportunities for top chess coaches in Australia.

== Notable games ==
- Evgeny Sveshnikov vs Mikhail Gluzman, Bern Open (1992), Alekhine's Defence: Chase Variation, (B02), 0-1

1.e4 Nf6 2.e5 Nd5 3.c4 Nb6 4.c5 Nd5 5.Nc3 c6 6.Bc4 e6 7.Qg4 f5 8.Qg3 b6 9.cxb6 axb6 10.Nge2 Ba6 11.d3 Qe7 12.0-0 Qf7 13.Bxd5 cxd5 14.Na4 Nc6 15.Bd2 b5 16.Nac3 b4 17.Nd1 Be7 18.b3 0-0 19.Nb2 Bb5 20.Rfc1 Ra3 21.Qe3 f4 22.Nxf4 Bg5 23.g3 Qf5 24.Rxc6 Bxc6 25.Bxb4 d4 26.Qe2 Raa8 27.Bxf8 Rxf8 28.Ng2 Bf3 29.Qe1 h5 30.Qf1 h4 31.Nc4 Qg4 32.Ne1 hxg3 33.Nxf3 gxf2+ 34.Kh1 Qxf3+ 35.Qg2 f1Q+ 0-1

- Darryl Johansen vs Mikhail Gluzman, Australian Championship (2002), Queen's Gambit Declined: Tarrasch Defence, (D34), 0-1

1.d4 d5 2.c4 e6 3.Nf3 c5 4.cxd5 exd5 5.Nc3 Nc6 6.g3 Nf6 7.Bg2 Be7 8.0-0 0-0 9.dxc5 Bxc5 10.Bg5 d4 11.Na4 Be7 12.Rc1 h6 13.Bxf6 Bxf6 14.a3 Rb8 15.Ne1 Re8 16.Nd3 Ne5 17.Nac5 Bg4 18.Re1 Nxd3 19.Nxd3 Re7 20.h3 Bf5 21.Rc5 Be4 22.Bxe4 Rxe4 23.Qa4 b6 24.Rc2 Qe7 25.Qc6 Re8 26.Qd5 g6 27.Kg2 h5 28.Rec1 Rxe2 29.Rxe2 Qxe2 30.Re1 Qxe1 31.Nxe1 Rxe1 32.g4 hxg4 33.hxg4 g5 34.b3 Kg7 35.Kf3 Re8 36.Qf5 a5 37.a4 Rd8 38.Qd3 Rc8 39.Ke4 Rd8 40.Kf3 Re8 41.Kg2 Rc8 42.Kf1 Re8 43.Qb5 Rd8 44.Ke2 d3+ 45.Kd2 Rd6 46.f3 Kf8 47.Qf5 Bc3+ 48.Kd1 Bb4 49.f4 Re6 0-1
