= Stanislav Savchenko =

Ukrainian chess grandmaster (born 1967)

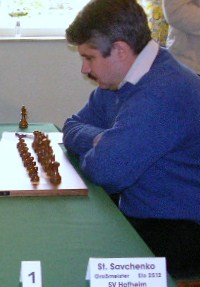
- Savchenko at Porz in 2005

Personal information
- Born: Станіслав Савченко; January 21, 1967 (age 59) Chornomorsk, Ukrainian SSR, Soviet Union

Chess career
- Country: Ukraine
- Title: Grandmaster (1993)
- FIDE rating: 2456 (July 2026)
- Peak rating: 2588 (October 2007)

Stanislav Savchenko (Ukrainian: Станіслав Олександрович Савченко; born 21 January 1967) is a Ukrainian chess grandmaster (1993). He took part in the FIDE World Chess Championship 2002, but was knocked out in the first round by Francisco Vallejo Pons.

He played for Ukraine in the Chess Olympiads of 1996 and 1998. In 1997 he tied for first through third place with Giorgi Bagaturov and Alexander Moroz in the Danko Chess Tournament in Yenakiieve. In 2006 he tied for first with Boris Chatalbashev in the 4th Georgiev-Kesarovski tournament. In 2007 he tied for first with Sergey Fedorchuk in Bad Zwesten Open.

On the May 2010 FIDE list his Elo rating is 2553.

Notable Games Savchenko-Sandler Belgorod,1989 Benoni, Taimanov Variation 1.d4 Nf6 2.c4 e6 3.Nc3 c5 4.d5 exd5 5.cxd5 d6 6.e4 g6 7.f4 Bg7 8.Bb5+ Nbd7 9.e5 dxe5 10.fxe5 Nh5 11.e6 Qh4+ 12.g3 Nxg3 13.hxg3 Qxh1 14.exd7+ Bxd7 15.Qe2+ Kd8 16.Bg5+ f6 17.O-O-O Re8 18.Qf1 fxg5 19.Bxd7 Kxd7 20.Qb5+ Kd6 21.Qxb7 Bxc3 22.Qc6+ Ke7 23.d6+ 1-0
