= Dorian Rogozenco =

Romanian chess grandmaster (born 1973)

Dorian Rogozenko
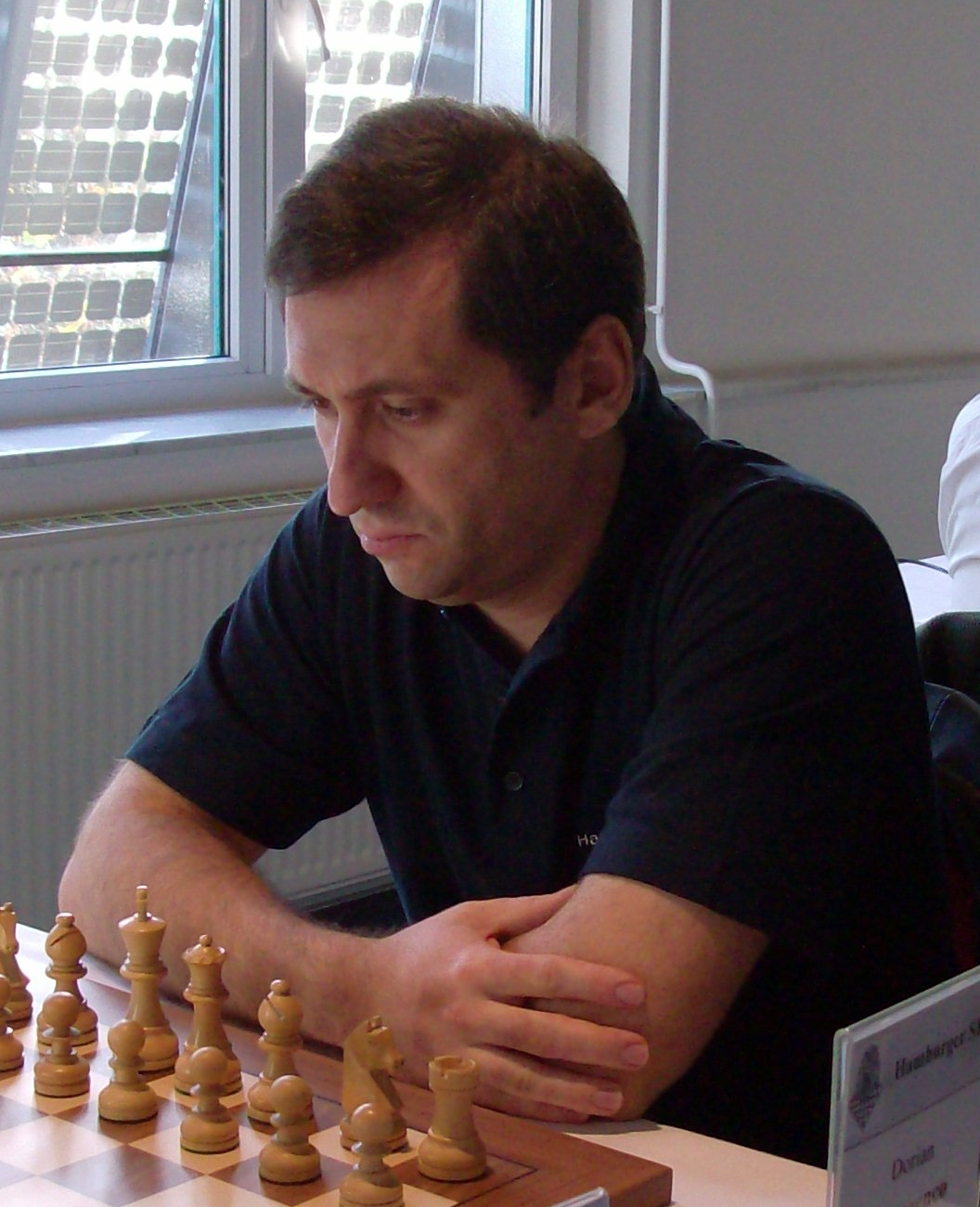
- Dorian Rogozenko, 2009

Personal information
- Born: 18 August 1973 (age 52) Kishinev, Moldavian SSR, Soviet Union

Chess career
- Country: Romania
- Title: Grandmaster (1996)
- FIDE rating: 2404 (July 2026)
- Peak rating: 2576 (July 1999)

Dorian Rogozenko (also spelled Rogozenco; born 18 August 1973) is a Romanian chess grandmaster (2002) and champion of Moldova in 1994.

He took part in the FIDE World Chess Championship 2002, but was knocked out in the first round by Mikhail Gurevich. He played for Moldova in the Chess Olympiads of 1994, 1996 and 1998 and for Romania in the 2000 Chess Olympiad. In 2008 he tied for 1st–3rd with Zigurds Lanka and Ahmed Adly at Hamburg.

In 2020, 12 German national team members stated, they can not play while Rogozenco remains their trainer.

== Books ==
- Rogozenko, Dorian (2003). Anti-Sicilians A Guide for Black. Gambit Publications. ISBN 1-901983-84-6.
- Rogozenko, Dorian (2005). The Sveshnikov Reloaded. Quality Chess. ISBN 91-97524-35-2.
- Rogozenco, Dorian (2021). Eight Good Men: The 2020-2021 Candidates Tournament. Elk and Ruby Publishing House. ISBN 978-5604177075.
