= Gary Benson (poker player) =

Australian poker player and sports bettor (born 1957)

- Nickname: OzGary
- Born: 1957 (age 68–69); Sydney, Australia

World Series of Poker
- Bracelet: 1
- Final tables: 6
- Money finishes: 25
- Highest WSOP Main Event finish: 283rd, 2007

World Poker Tour
- Final table: 1
- Money finish: 1

Gary Benson (born 1957, in Sydney, Australia) is an Australian professional poker player and sports bettor. He has won a World Series of Poker bracelet in addition to other titles as a poker player.

== Early life and career ==
Benson started playing poker during his school years, but his interest in card games was fostered at a young age by his grandmother. He attended his first live poker game in the late 1970s and has been a stalwart on the Australian and New Zealand poker scene ever since.

Benson obtained a Bachelor of Business from the University of Technology, Sydney in 1983, and was admitted as a Chartered Accountant in 1985. From 1989 until his retirement in 1995, Benson worked as a partner at the chartered accountant firm Grant Thornton.

Benson has been married twice with three daughters, and his hobbies include chess, genealogy and travel.

== Poker career ==
Benson attended the first Australian Poker Championship held in Adelaide in 1987, and has since attended nearly every major poker event in Australia and New Zealand. Benson enjoys Pot Limit Omaha and Limit Seven-card stud tournaments, predominantly plays Omaha Hi/Lo online, and can often be found playing the biggest cash games at any casino he attends, usually High Limit Omaha. In addition to many tournament victories, Benson's major achievements include being crowned the Australian Poker Champion in Adelaide in 1997, and the Australian National Champion in Canberra in 2000.

Benson made his first trip to Las Vegas in 1990 and entered his first World Series of Poker in 1996, where he won the $1,500 Seven-card stud event to become the first Australian-born winner of a gold bracelet. On 24 April 1996, after a 15-hour battle, Benson managed to outlast the field of 247 players to take home the $148,200 prize. Benson reached the final table fourth in chips and finished heads-up with Las Vegas poker professional Billy Cohen. On the last hand, Cohen was forced all-in after Benson had won a huge pot on the previous hand. The two-hour heads-up battle was finally over when Benson's pair of Kings beat Cohen's pair of sevens. Benson also had three money finishes at the 2006 WSOP.

As of 2014, Benson's total live tournament winnings exceed $2,000,000 including his 2nd-place finish in World Poker Tour Doyle Brunson Five Diamond World Poker Classic in Las Vegas in 2013 for $672,685. As of 2024, his live tournament winnings exceed $2,500,000.

In January 2009, Benson was honoured to become one of the inaugural inductees into the Australian Poker Hall of Fame.

== Chess career ==
Benson started playing chess at the age of 13 and joined the Correspondence Chess League of Australia (CCLA) in 1970. Benson is a former Australian Champion having won the Australian Correspondence Chess Championship in 2003. Benson was awarded the International Master (IM) title for Correspondence Chess in 2004, and the Senior International Master (SIM) title for Correspondence Chess in 2005.
