= Australian Correspondence Chess Championship =

The Australian Correspondence Chess Championship is organised by the Correspondence Chess League of Australia (CCLA). The event was held three times before 1937, with O Ludlow winning once and F M Hallman winning twice. Regular championships have been held since 1937 with a break from 1939 to 1945 due to World War II.

== Australian Correspondence Chess Championship ==
- 1937 C.J.S. Purdy
- 1948 C.J.S. Purdy
- 1950 Romanas Arlauskas
- 1955 Max Salm
- 1959 Karlis Ozols, John Kellner
- 1961 John Kellner
- 1963 Lloyd Fell
- 1966 Alan Miller, Max Salm
- 1969 Clive Barnett
- 1972 Peter Thompson
- 1975 Michael Woodhams
- 1977 Irvis Venclovas, Greg Ware
- 1979 Norton Jacobi, Roy Weigand
- 1981 Kevin Harrison
- 1983 Simon Jenkinson
- 1985 Lloyd Fell
- 1987 Guy West
- 1989 Frank Hutchings
- 1991 Jose Silva
- 1993 Frank Hutchings
- 1995 Bill Jordan
- 1997 Clive Barnett, Stewart Booth
- 1999 Mike Juradowitch
- 2001 Stewart Booth
- 2003 Gary Benson
- 2004 Bruce Oates
- 2005 Dr. Clive Barnett, John Paul Fenwick
- 2006 Dr. Clive Barnett
- 2007 Dr. E.B. Morgan
- 2008 John Paul Fenwick
- 2010 Simon Jenkinson
- 2012 Clive Murden
- 2013 Colin D. McKenzie
- 2014 Colin D. McKenzie
- 2015 Barrie Mulligan
- 2016 Richard Egelstaff
- 2017 Barrie Mulligan
- 2018 Joseph Tanti
- 2019 Barrie Mulligan
- 2020 Eric Staak
- 2021 Simon W. Jenkinson
- 2022 Simon W. Jenkinson, Eric Staak
- 2023 Gordon Dunlop
- 2024 Joe Klimczak
- 2025 Gordon Dunlop
- 2026 In progress

== See also ==
- Chess in Australia
