= Vasily Papin =

Russian chess Grandmaster (born 1988)

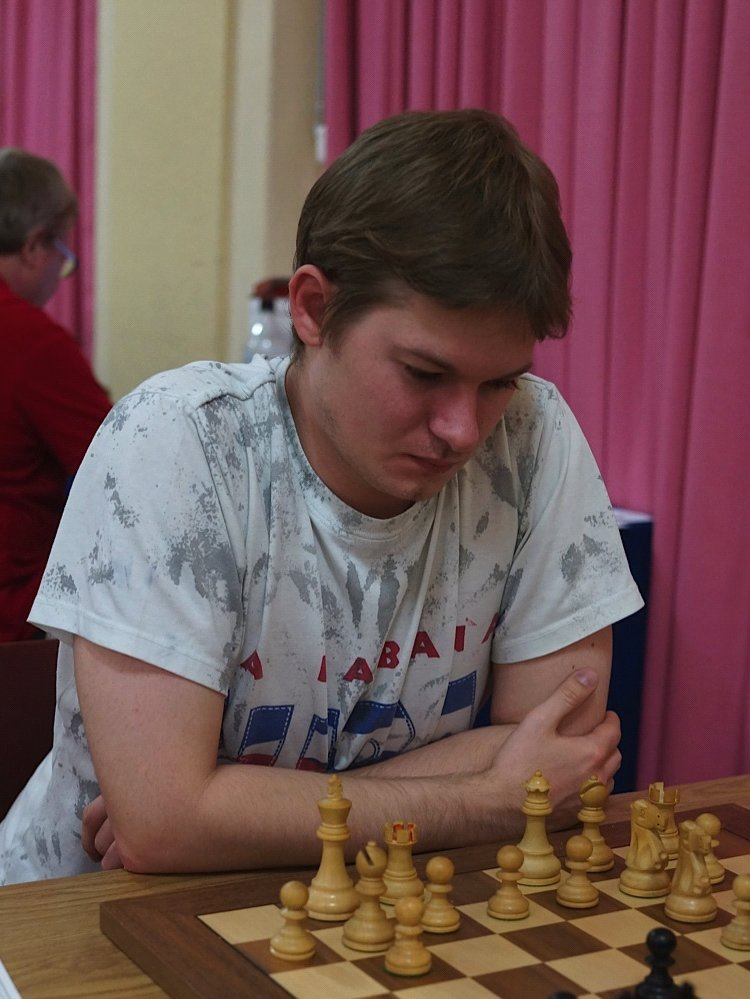
- Vasily Papin at the Australasian Masters GM tournament in Melbourne 2013.

Personal information
- Born: September 21, 1988 (age 37) Moscow, Russia

Chess career
- Country: Russia
- Title: Grandmaster (2011)
- FIDE rating: 2477 (July 2026)
- Peak rating: 2583 (September 2011)

Vasily Viktorovich Papin (Russian: Василий Викторович Папин; born 21 September 1988, in Moscow) is a Russian chess Grandmaster.

== Chess career ==
In his younger years, Papin competed in numerous national and international junior tournaments including the European Youth Chess Championship, the World Youth Chess Championship, and the World Junior Chess Championship in Istanbul 2005. He finished third in the U-12 European Youth Chess Championship in Kallithea 2000. He scored 8/8 to win a junior event in Rybinsk 2004.

Papin won the Orienta IM in Moscow 2004/05, finished equal first in the Rostov-on-Don Regional Championship 2005, won the Rybinsk Open 2005, finished equal first in the Azov Cup open 2007, and finished third in the Dubna GM 2007.

Papin participated in the European Individual Chess Championship in 2008, 2010, 2011, and 2012.

In 2009, Papin finished equal second in the Doroshkevich Memorial Open in Belorechensk, won the Rostov-on-Don Regional Championship, and won the Peaceful Atom open in Volgodonsk.

In 2010, Papin finished third in the 64th Moscow Blitz Chess Championship, won the Nizhny Don Cup in Azov, jointly won the Mirny Atom in Volgodonsk, won the 5th Dvorkovich Memorial Open in Taganrog, and finished fifth in the 11th World University Chess Championship in Zurich.

Papin was awarded the Grandmaster title in February 2011 for his results in the 7th N.K.Aratovsky Memorial 2007 Open in Saratov, and the 2009 and 2010 M.Chigorin Memorial tournaments in Saint Petersburg.

During 2011, Papin jointly won the 6th Dvorkovich Memorial Open in Taganrog and finished equal second in The 26th Summer Universiade in Shenzhen. He won the 2012 Moscow Open F Tournament for students, won the 2013 New Caledonia International Open in Nouméa, and finished equal first in the 2013 Australasian Masters GM tournament in Melbourne.

He finished equal first in the 2014 "Taça Cuca SA" International Open in Luanda.

Papin has played in the Icelandic Team Championship and has represented SV1930 Hockenheim in the German chess Bundesliga. His highest ever FIDE rating was 2583 in September 2011. In recent years, he has been a frequent visitor to Australia and participated in a number of Australian Chess Tournaments, including Australian Masters and Australian Open Championships.
