= Zhang Zhong =

Chinese chess grandmaster (born 1978)

Personal information
- Born: 5 September 1978 (age 47) Chongqing, China
- Spouse: Li Ruofan

Chess career
- Country: China; Singapore (2007–2017)
- Title: Grandmaster (1998)
- FIDE rating: 2561 (July 2026)
- Peak rating: 2667 (July 2001)
- Peak ranking: No. 27 (July 2001)

Chinese name
- Traditional Chinese: 章鍾
- Simplified Chinese: 章钟
Transcriptions
Standard Mandarin
- Hanyu Pinyin: Zhāng Zhōng
- Gwoyeu Romatzyh: Jang Jong
- Wade–Giles: Chang¹ Chung¹
- Tongyong Pinyin: Jhāng Jhōng
- Yale Romanization: Jāng Jūng
- IPA: [ʈʂáŋ ʈʂʊ́ŋ]
Yue: Cantonese
- Yale Romanization: Jeung Jung
- Jyutping: Zoeng¹ Zung¹
- IPA: [tsœ́ːŋ tsʊ́ŋ]
Southern Min
- Hokkien POJ: Chiong-Chêng

Zhang Zhong (simplified Chinese: 章钟; traditional Chinese: 章鍾; pinyin: Zhāng Zhōng; born 5 September 1978) is a Chinese chess grandmaster, a twice Chinese champion and the 2005 Asian champion. In 1998, he became China's 9th Grandmaster.

== Career ==
Zhang Zhong finished second at the World Junior Chess Championship twice, in 1996 and 1998. He won the Chinese Chess Championship in 2001 and 2003. In 2002 he scored 8.5/12 points at the 35th Chess Olympiad in Bled and won the 7th World University Chess Championship in Ulaanbaatar. Zhang Zhong was clear first with a score of 11/13 at the Corus B tournament in Wijk aan Zee in 2003, three points ahead of his nearest rival. This result qualified him for the prestigious main Corus A tournament in 2004, in which he scored 5/13. He won the 2005 Asian Chess Championship to qualify for the FIDE World Cup held that year, where he beat Mikhail Kobalia in the first round, but lost to Ivan Sokolov in the second.

In 2007 he transferred national federations to represent Singapore. In 2008, he won ASEAN Chess Circuit Tournament in Tarakan. In 2014, he tied for 1st–3rd with Nguyễn Ngọc Trường Sơn and Lê Quang Liêm, placing second on tiebreak, at the 4th HDBank Cup in Ho Chi Minh City, and won the 11th IGB Dato' Athur Tan Malaysia Open in Kuala Lumpur. In 2017 Zhang moved back to the Chinese federation.

== China Chess League ==
Zhang Zhong plays for China Mobile Group Chongqing Company Ltd chess club in the China Chess League (CCL).

== Personal life ==
He is married to WGM Li Ruofan.

Preceded by Liang Jinrong	Men's Chinese Chess Champion; 2001	Succeeded by Zhang Pengxiang
Preceded by Zhang Pengxiang	Men's Chinese Chess Champion; 2003	Succeeded by Bu Xiangzhi
