= Guy West =

Australian chess player (born 1958)

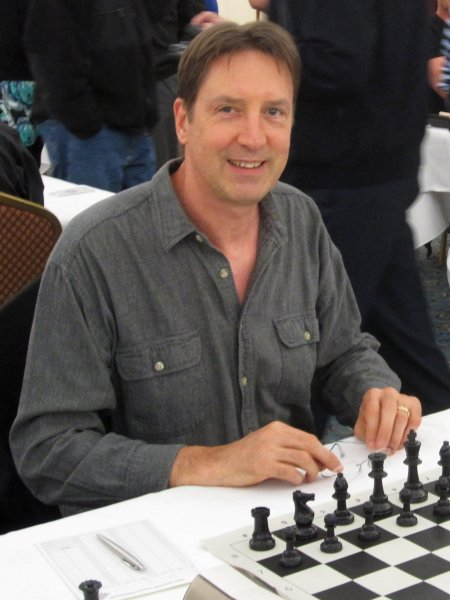
- West at the 2012 Queenstown Classic

Personal information
- Born: 7 September 1958 (age 67) Babinda, Queensland, Australia

Chess career
- Country: Australia
- Title: International Master (1990), International Correspondence Chess Master (1991)
- FIDE rating: 2302 (September 2019)
- Peak rating: 2445 (January 1991)
- ICCF rating: 2477 (July 1999)

Guy West (born 7 September 1958) is an Australian chess player who holds the FIDE title of International Master (IM). He is a former Australian Chess Champion.

== Biography ==
West was born in Babinda, Queensland, and moved to Melbourne at the age of 12. He became interested in chess during the 'Fischer boom' of the early 1970s and joined Heidelberg Chess Club, where Ian Rogers (who later became Australia's highest ranked player) was a noteworthy junior.

West was first selected to represent Australia in 1978 at the World Student Chess Olympiad in Mexico City, followed by the 1978 World Junior Chess Championship in Graz, Austria.

Early in his career he represented Australia in two international telechess matches, the first one being in 1977 against Russia (on the junior board) where he lost to future World Champion Garry Kasparov.

In 1981 West spent several months based in England and won the City of London Open.

In 1982 he won the Dunhill Congress in Sydney and also the Australian Lightning Championship, where players get five minutes for the whole game .

West unexpectedly won the 1984/85 Australian Open Chess Championship in Ballarat, where American Grandmaster Pal Benko (of Benko Gambit fame) was top seed.

He won consecutive Victorian Chess Championships in 1987, 1988 and 1989 and has held the Victorian State chess title four times in total.

In 1990 West won the Parkway International tournament in Singapore and was subsequently awarded the title of International Master by the World Chess Federation (FIDE).

He also holds the title of International Master in correspondence chess, where several days are allowed for each move. He won the only Australian Correspondence Chess Championship that he contested, in 1987.

Perhaps his most heralded career victory was winning the 1995/96 Australian Chess Championship, in Sydney.

He is also a three-time winner of the Australian Masters tournament.

During his career West has represented Australia at nine World Chess Olympiads, consisting of Valletta 1980, Lucerne 1982, Dubai 1986, Thessaloniki 1988, Novi Sad 1990, Manila 1992, Moscow 1994, Elista 1998 and Istanbul 2000.

His best rating performance to date was a score of 8.5/9 to win the 2010 George Trundle Masters tournament in Auckland, achieving a FIDE performance rating for the tournament of 2794.

West has never been a professional chess player. He is registered as a Section 708 Wholesale (sophisticated) Investor and is the owner of internet company OZmium Pty Ltd.
