= Vadim Zvjaginsev =

Russian chess grandmaster (born 1976)

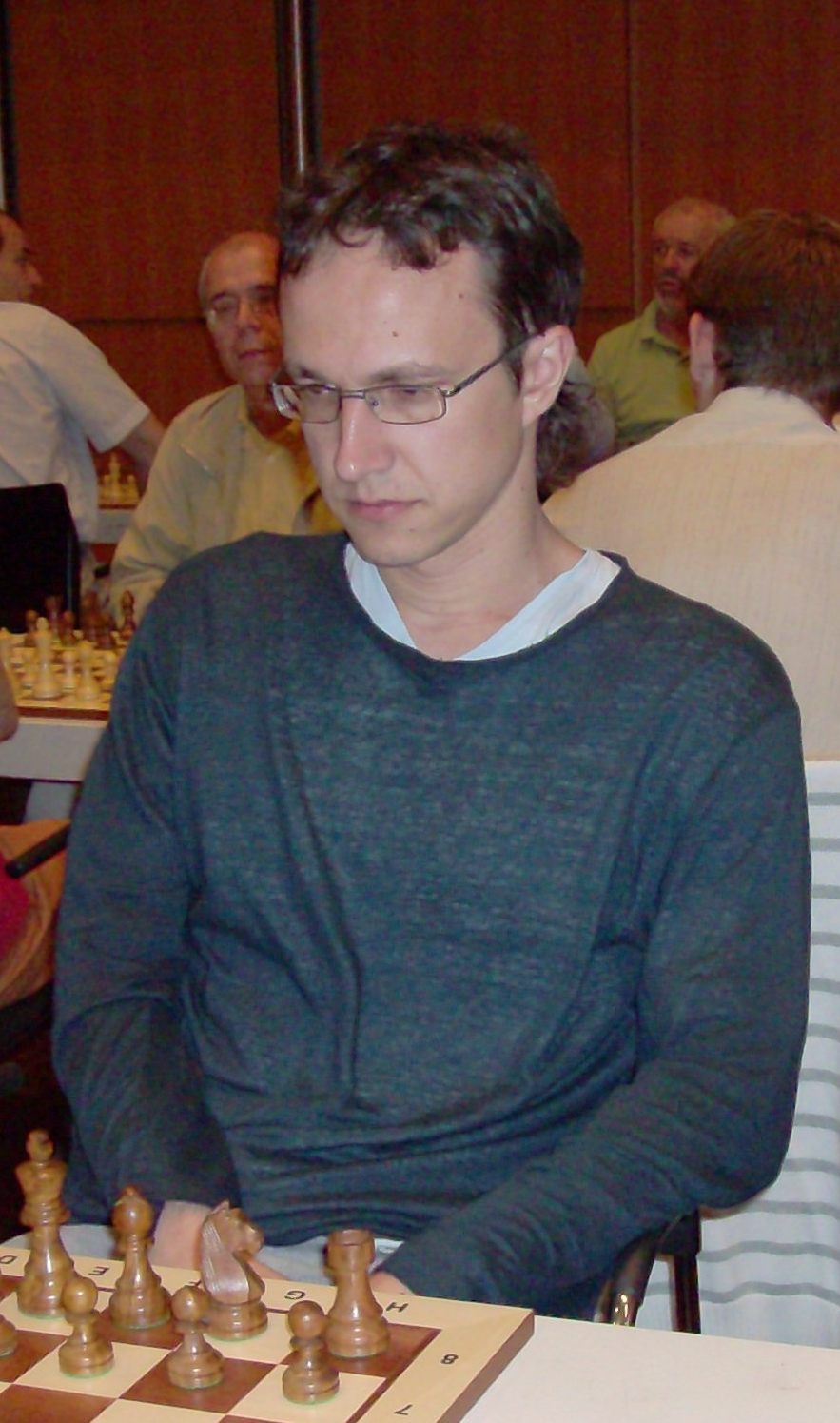
- Zvjaginsev in 2009

Personal information
- Born: Vadim Victorovich Zvyagintsev; 18 August 1976 (age 49) Moscow, Russian SFSR, Soviet Union

Chess career
- Country: Russia
- Title: Grandmaster (1994)
- FIDE rating: 2525 (July 2026)
- Peak rating: 2688 (January 2012)
- Peak ranking: No. 23 (October 2002)

Vadim Zvjaginsev (Russian: Вади́м Ви́кторович Звя́гинцев, romanized: Vadim Victorovich Zvyagintsev; born 18 August 1976 in Moscow) is a Russian chess player who received the FIDE title of Grandmaster (GM) in 1994. He played for the gold medal-winning Russian team in the 1997 World Team Chess Championship and in the 1998 Chess Olympiad.

He graduated from Moscow State University (Faculty of Economics) in 1996.

== Career ==
Zviagintsev started playing chess competitively at a young age at the Moscow Chess School of Olympic Reserve. Shortly after, he came into limelight by becoming one of the youngest Candidate Masters of Sport in USSR and then - one of the Youngerst Masters of Sport (National Masters)Zvjanginsev won the European under-16 championship in 1992. Two years later, he tied for first place in the Reykjavik Open with Hannes Stefánsson and Evgeny Pigusov.

In 1997, at the FIDE World Championship, which took place in Groningen, he single-handedly knocked out most of the U.S. contingent. In consecutive rounds, he defeated Joel Benjamin, Gregory Kaidanov and Yasser Seirawan, before losing to fellow Russian GM Alexey Dreev in round 4. In the same year, Zvjanginsev won the Vidmar Memorial in Portorož.

In 2000, he was first at Essen (ahead of Dreev and Klaus Bischoff) and triumphed there again in 2002 (this time ahead of Leko). At the Mainz Chess Classic in 2003, he finished joint second behind Levon Aronian, repeating his placing the following year. At the Russian Championships of 2005, he took 3rd place at the Kazan qualifier and finished joint 4th at the Superfinal. In 2006, he tied for 2nd at the Poikovsky Karpov Tournament, behind Alexei Shirov.

In 2002, Zvjanginsev took part in the Russia vs Rest of the World match, held in Moscow.

He won the Russian Cup knockout tournament in 2011 by beating Denis Khismatullin in the final. In the 2013 Chigorin Memorial in Saint Petersburg, Zvjanginsev tied for 1st–11th with Pavel Eljanov, Dmitry Kokarev, Maxim Matlakov, Alexander Areshchenko, Denis Khismatullin, Oleg Korneev, Dragan Šolak, Sanan Sjugirov, Ivan Bukavshin and Ildar Khairullin. In the 2016 Aeroflot Open, he tied 3rd-10th with Vladimir Fedoseev, Gata Kamsky, Daniil Dubov, Mateusz Bartel, Sanan Sjugirov, Maxim Matlakov, and Mikhail Kobalia.

In team competitions, he took team and individual silver medals at the 1997 European Team Chess Championship. At the 1994 Chess Olympiad, while still only an International Master, he helped the Russian second team obtain a team bronze medal. In the 1997 World Team Chess Championship Zvjanginsev won two gold medals, team and individual playing second reserve board. With the main Russian team, in 1998 and 2004, he contributed respectively to team gold and team silver medals at the Chess Olympiad.

== Playing style ==
Zvjaginsev has been described as a very aggressive, tactical player. Viktor Korchnoi in an interview described him as a very original player, with an unusual view on life, which is reflected in his chess. He has been known to unleash the occasional outlandish opening novelty in order to catch his opponent off guard and avoid established theory and home preparation. At a number of events, he even rolled out his own startling antidote to the Sicilian Defence, which renders the game a battle of wits from the very start. The revolutionary 1.e4 c5 2.Na3!? surprised the entire chess world around 2005, not least top grandmasters Alexander Khalifman and Ruslan Ponomariov (both former FIDE World Champions), whom Zvjaginsev defeated with his creation.

In 2025, Zvjaginsev tied for second place along with Andrey Esipenko and Daniil Dubov, all scoring 6 points. He was undefeated throughout the tournament and won 15 rating points.

== Unbeaten streak ==
Zvjaginsev has a 92-game unbeaten streak. However, he has lost 17 points since most of his games were draws against lower-rated players.

== Notable games ==
The following game demonstrates Zvjaginsev's opportunistic, tactical style. White probes black's defences on the kingside, the queenside and ultimately in the centre, forcing a series of weaknesses that spell disaster.

Zvjaginsev (2635) – Seirawan (2630) [D63] FIDE WCh KO Groningen NED (3.4), 16.12.1997
1.d4 Nf6 2.c4 e6 3.Nc3 d5 4.Bg5 Nbd7 5.Nf3 h6 6.Bh4 Be7 7.e3 0-0 8.Rc1 a6 9.b3 b6 10.cxd5 exd5 11.Bd3 Bb7 12.Bf5 g6 13.Bh3 Re8 14.0-0 Nf8 15.Ne5 N6h7 16.Bxe7 Rxe7 17.g3 Qd6 18.Bg2 Rd8 19.Qc2 Ne6 20.Rfd1 Kg7 21.Qb2 f6 22.Nd3 Nhf8 23.b4 g5 24.Nc5 bxc5 25.bxc5 Qc6 26.e4 Red7 27.exd5 Rxd5 28.Nxd5 Rxd5 29.Rb1 Nd8 30.Qe2 Qd7 31.Rxb7 Nxb7 32.c6 Qxc6 33.Qe7+ Kg8 34.Qe4 1–0

Cifuentes-Parada vs. Zvjaginsev, 1995

Position: g1 white king, d1 white rook, a1 white rook, h2 white pawn, g2 white bishop, f2 white pawn, e2 white knight, c2 white queen, b2 white pawn, a2 white pawn, g3 white pawn, e3 white knight, e4 black knight, b4 black pawn, d5 white pawn, c5 black pawn, h6 white bishop, g6 black pawn, f6 black knight, d6 black bishop, a6 black pawn, h7 black pawn, f7 black pawn, d7 black queen, b7 black bishop, g8 black king, e8 black rook, d8 black rook

Position after 24.Bg2

In the following game, Zvjaginsev unleashes a stunning sacrificial attack:

Cifuentes-Parada – Zvjaginsev, Wijk aan Zee Open 1995
1.d4 e6 2.Nf3 d5 3.c4 Nf6 4.Nc3 c6 5.e3 Nbd7 6.Qc2 b6 7.Be2 Bb7 8.0-0 Be7 9.Rd1 0-0 10.e4 dxe4 11.Nxe4 Qc7 12.Nc3 c5 13.d5 exd5 14.cxd5 a6 15.Nh4 g6 16.Bh6 Rfe8 17.Qd2 Bd6 18.g3 b5 19.Bf3 b4 20.Ne2 Ne4 21.Qc2 Ndf6 22.Ng2 Qd7 23.Ne3 Rad8 24.Bg2? (see diagram)

Sacrificing a knight, an exchange, and his queen to force mate against White's king on the sixth rank.

24...Nxf2! 25.Kxf2 Rxe3! 26.Bxe3 Ng4+ 27.Kf3 Nxh2+ 28.Kf2 Ng4+ 29.Kf3 Qe6! 30.Bf4 Re8 31.Qc4 Qe3+!! 32.Bxe3 Rxe3+ 33.Kxg4 Bc8+ 34.Kg5 h6+ 35.Kxh6 Re5 0–1

Black threatens 36...Rh5# and 36...Bf8#, and White cannot stop both. This was voted the best game of that volume of Chess Informant.

Malakhov vs. Zvjaginsev, 2004

Position: h1 black queen, g1 white queen, f1 white king, a1 white rook, g2 white pawn, g3 black bishop, d3 black pawn, b3 white knight, f4 white pawn, e4 black pawn, b4 white pawn, a4 white pawn, g6 black pawn, c6 white pawn, h7 black pawn, f7 black pawn, g8 black king, d8 black rook

Position after 41.Qg1

Here is another Zvjaginsev brilliancy, this time against super-grandmaster Vladimir Malakhov:

Malakhov (2700) – Zvjaginsev (2654), 5th Karpov Tournament, Poikovsky 2004
1.Nf3 Nf6 2.c4 g6 3.Nc3 Bg7 4.e4 d6 5.Be2 0-0 6.0-0 e5 7.d4 Nc6 8.d5 Ne7 9.Nd2 a5 10.a3 Bd7 11.b3 c6 12.Bb2 Qb6 13.dxc6 bxc6 14.Na4 Qc7 15.c5 d5 16.Nb6 Rad8 17.Bc3 Nxe4 18.Nxe4 dxe4 19.Bxa5 Nf5 20.Nc4 Qb8 21.Bxd8 Rxd8 22.b4 Be6 23.Qe1 Nd4 24.Na5 Qc8 25.Rd1 Bh6 26.Kh1 Bf4 27.a4 Bd5 28.Bc4 Nf3! 29.Qe2 Nxh2 30.Bxd5 cxd5 31.f3 Nxf1 32.Rxf1 e3 33.c6 d4 34.Rd1 Bg3 35.f4 e4 36.Nb3 d3 37.Qxe3 Qg4 38.Rb1 Qh4+ 39.Kg1 Qh2+ 40.Kf1 Qh1+ 41.Qg1 (see diagram) 41...e3!! 42.Qxh1 e2+ 43.Kg1 d2 0–1

White, a queen up, is helpless against Black's two connected passed pawns, e.g. 44.Nxd2 Rxd2 45.Re1 Rd1! This was voted the fourth-best game in Volume 90 of Chess Informant.
