= Evgeny Pigusov =

Russian chess grandmaster (born 1961)

Personal information
- Born: March 31, 1961 (age 65) Kemerovo, Soviet Union

Chess career
- Country: Soviet Union → Russia
- Title: Grandmaster (1987)
- FIDE rating: 2508 (July 2026)
- Peak rating: 2623 (January 2002)
- Peak ranking: No. 54 (July 1989)

Evgeny Pigusov (Russian: Евгений Пигусов; born March 31, 1961) is a Russian chess player. He was awarded the title of Grandmaster by FIDE in 1987. He competed in the FIDE World Chess Championship 2002, where he reached the third round.

== Career ==
Pigusov tied for the first place at the Politiken Cup in Copenhagen in 1986, the Chigorin Memorial in Sochi in 1987, the Reykjavik Open in 1994. He tied for 1st at Havana 1986, tied for 2nd at Moscow 1987 and Dordrecht 1988. In team events, Pigusov won the team gold medal in the European Chess Club Cup in 1988, playing for CSKA Moscow, and the World Cities Chess Championship in 1999 playing for Kemerovo.

== Notable games ==
- Zhang Pengxiang vs Evgeny Pigusov (2001) FIDE WCh KO 2001, Queen Pawn Game: Veresov Attack. Two Knights System, (D01), 0-1
